= 2022 Los Angeles Angels season =

Major League Baseball season

2022 Los Angeles Angels
- League: American League
- Division: West
- Ballpark: Angel Stadium
- City: Anaheim, California
- Record: 73–89 (.451)
- Divisional place: 3rd
- Owner: Arte Moreno
- President: John Carpino
- General manager: Perry Minasian
- Managers: Joe Maddon (fired June 7); Phil Nevin (interim, remainder of season)
- Television: Bally Sports West (Matt Vasgersian/Patrick O'Neal, Mark Gubicza)
- Radio: KLAA (AM 830); KSPN (AM 710); Angels Radio Network (Terry Smith, Mark Langston); Spanish: KWKW (AM 1330)
- Stats: ESPN.com; Baseball Reference

The 2022 Los Angeles Angels season was the 62nd season of the Angels franchise in the American League, the 57th in Anaheim, and their 57th season playing their home games at Angel Stadium. The Angels were managed by Joe Maddon in his third season as manager of the Angels. On June 7, 2022, Maddon was fired and Phil Nevin was named the interim manager for the remainder of the season after they had lost twelve games in a row, tying a record set by the 1988 team. Losses on the 7th and 8th resulted in a losing streak of fourteen in a row, setting a franchise record. After a brawl occurred during a game between the Seattle Mariners and Angels on June 26 that saw players and coaches receive suspensions, Bill Haselman and Ray Montgomery each served as interim managers to the interim manager when Nevin received a ten-game suspension. The Angels play as members of Major League Baseball's American League West division. On September 14, the Angels lost their 82nd game to clinch a losing season for the seventh straight season, tying the mark set by the 1971-1977 teams. With their loss to the Seattle Mariners on September 19, the Los Angeles Angels were officially eliminated from playoff contention.

On December 2, 2021, Commissioner of Baseball Rob Manfred announced a lockout of players, following expiration of the collective bargaining agreement (CBA) between the league and the Major League Baseball Players Association (MLBPA). On March 10, 2022, MLB and the MLBPA agreed to a new collective bargaining agreement, thus ending the lockout. Opening Day was played on April 7. Although MLB previously announced that several series would be cancelled due to the lockout, the agreement provides for a 162-game season, with originally canceled games to be made up via doubleheaders.

Joining PBP man Matt Vasgersian this season for broadcasts on Bally Sports West is Patrick O'Neal on his first season as alternative team PBP announcer.

== Offseason ==
=== Lockout ===
The expiration of the league's collective bargaining agreement (CBA) with the Major League Baseball Players Association occurred on December 1, 2021, with no new agreement in place. As a result, the team owners voted unanimously to lockout the players stopping all free agency and trades.

The parties came to an agreement on a new CBA on March 10, 2022.

=== Rule changes ===
Pursuant to the new CBA, several new rules were instituted for the 2022 season. The National League will adopt the designated hitter full-time, a draft lottery will be implemented, the postseason will expand from ten teams to twelve, and advertising patches will appear on player uniforms and helmets for the first time.

=== Opening Day lineup ===
The team opened the season with a 3–1 loss to the Houston Astros at Angel Stadium on April 7.

Order	No.	Player	Pos.
1	17	Shohei Ohtani	SP/DH
2	27	Mike Trout	CF
3	6	Anthony Rendon	3B
4	14	Matt Duffy	2B
5	7	Jo Adell	LF
6	20	Jared Walsh	1B
7	33	Max Stassi	C
8	16	Brandon Marsh	RF
9	22	David Fletcher	SS
—	17	Shohei Ohtani	P

== Regular season ==
=== April ===
The Angels opened the season on April 7 at home against the Houston Astros in front of a crowd of 44,723, losing 3–1 after Shohei Ohtani pitched 4.2 innings and gave up 1 run. The Angels won their first game of the season on April 9, a 2–0 win over Justin Verlander and the Astros with Noah Syndergaard earning the win in his team debut. The Angels had their first walk-off win on April 12 over the Miami Marlins with Tyler Wade scoring the winning run on a fielder's choice. During an April 20 game in Houston, the Angels scored six runs off Jake Odorizzi in the first inning and Ohtani carried a perfect game bid into the sixth inning. The win gave the Angels an early lead in the American League West standings. After losing their initial series to the Astros, the Angels won four out of their next five series in April, including a 4-game sweep of the Cleveland Guardians in Anaheim. The Angels finished the month of April with a 14–8 record.

=== May ===
The Angels entered May leading the AL West by 2.5 games. On May 1, newcomer Michael Lorenzen pitched the longest outing of his career at 8.1 innings and nearly achieved a shutout before runs were allowed in the 9th inning. On May 4, the Angels completed an extra-innings comeback after Jared Walsh tied the game in the top of the 9th inning and the Angels scored six runs in the 10th.

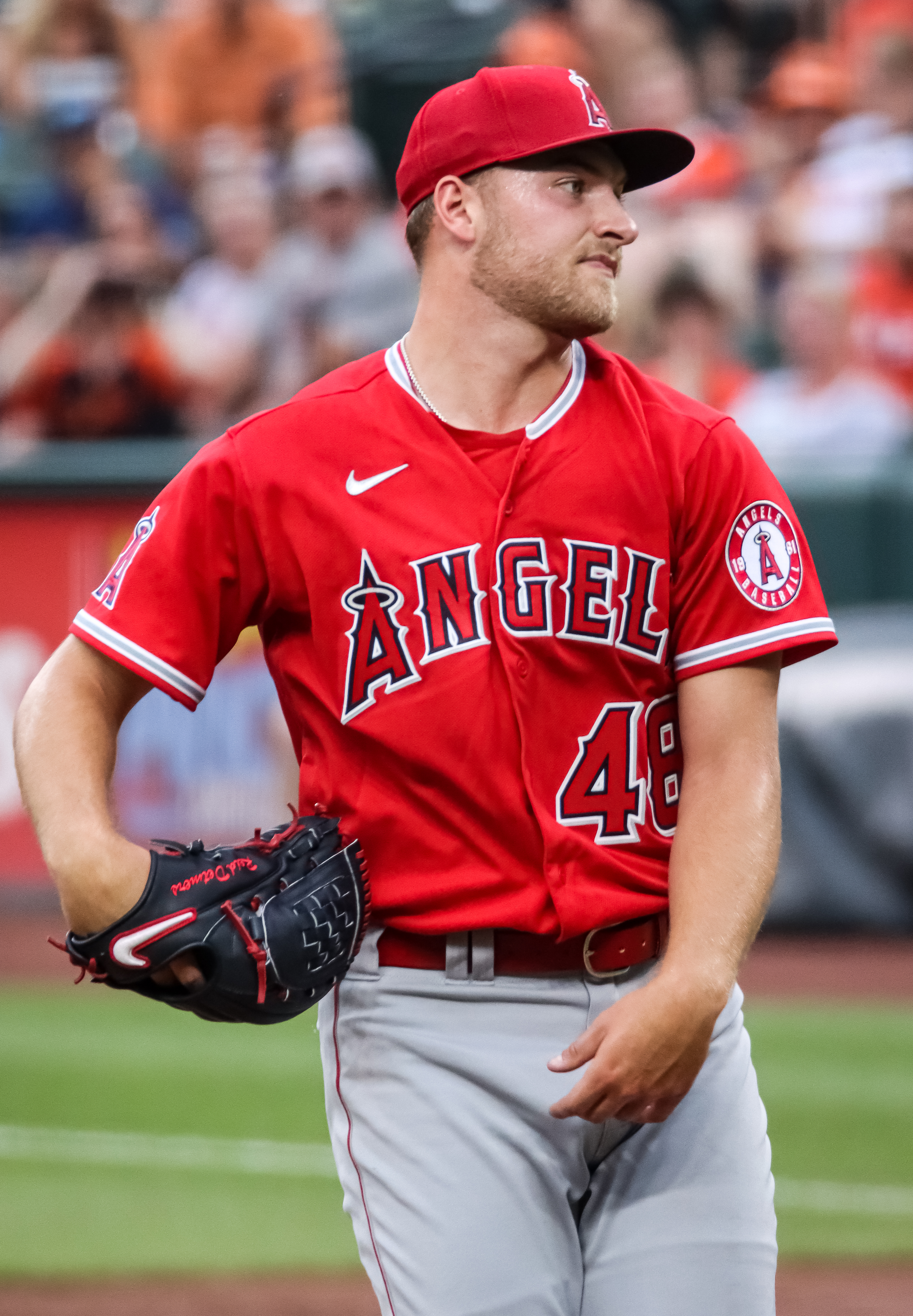
Reid Detmers threw the ninth no-hitter in Angels history on May 10

On May 10, Reid Detmers became the ninth player in Angels history to throw a no-hitter, doing so against the Tampa Bay Rays in a 12–0 win. At 22 years old, Detmers was the youngest MLB player to throw a no-hitter since Aníbal Sánchez in 2006. Detmers recorded only two strikeouts in the game and induced 10 groundouts. In the bottom of the 8th, Angels third baseman Anthony Rendon took the first left-handed at-bat of his career and proceeded to hit a two-run home run off Brett Phillips, a position player pitching, to make the score 12–0. The final out of the game was a groundout hit by Yandy Díaz to Andrew Velazquez that was caught by Jared Walsh at first base. After the game, the Angels moved to a 21–11 record with a 1-game lead in the AL West standings.

On May 13, Chase Silseth became the first member of 2021 MLB draft to make their major league debut. He pitched six innings, giving up only one hit and no runs in a win over the Oakland Athletics. On May 14, closer Raisel Iglesias gave up a walk-off home run to Athletics outfielder Luis Barrera, his first blown save since July 28, 2021. The Angels were swept for the first time that year during a series against the Texas Rangers in Arlington from May 16 to May 18. The team finished the month on a six-game losing streak after being swept by the Toronto Blue Jays in Anaheim and losing the first two games of a series against the New York Yankees in The Bronx.

=== June ===
On June 6, the Angels fell 1–0 to the Red Sox, bringing their losing streak to 12 games, tied for the worst in franchise history. The following day, Angels field manager Joe Maddon was fired by general manager Perry Minasian with approval from team owner Arte Moreno. Phil Nevin was named as the interim manager for the remainder of the 2022 season. On June 8, the Angels lost their 14th straight game, setting a new record for longest losing streak in franchise history. The streak was snapped the following day with a 5–2 win over the Red Sox and a seven-inning, one-run effort from Ohtani.

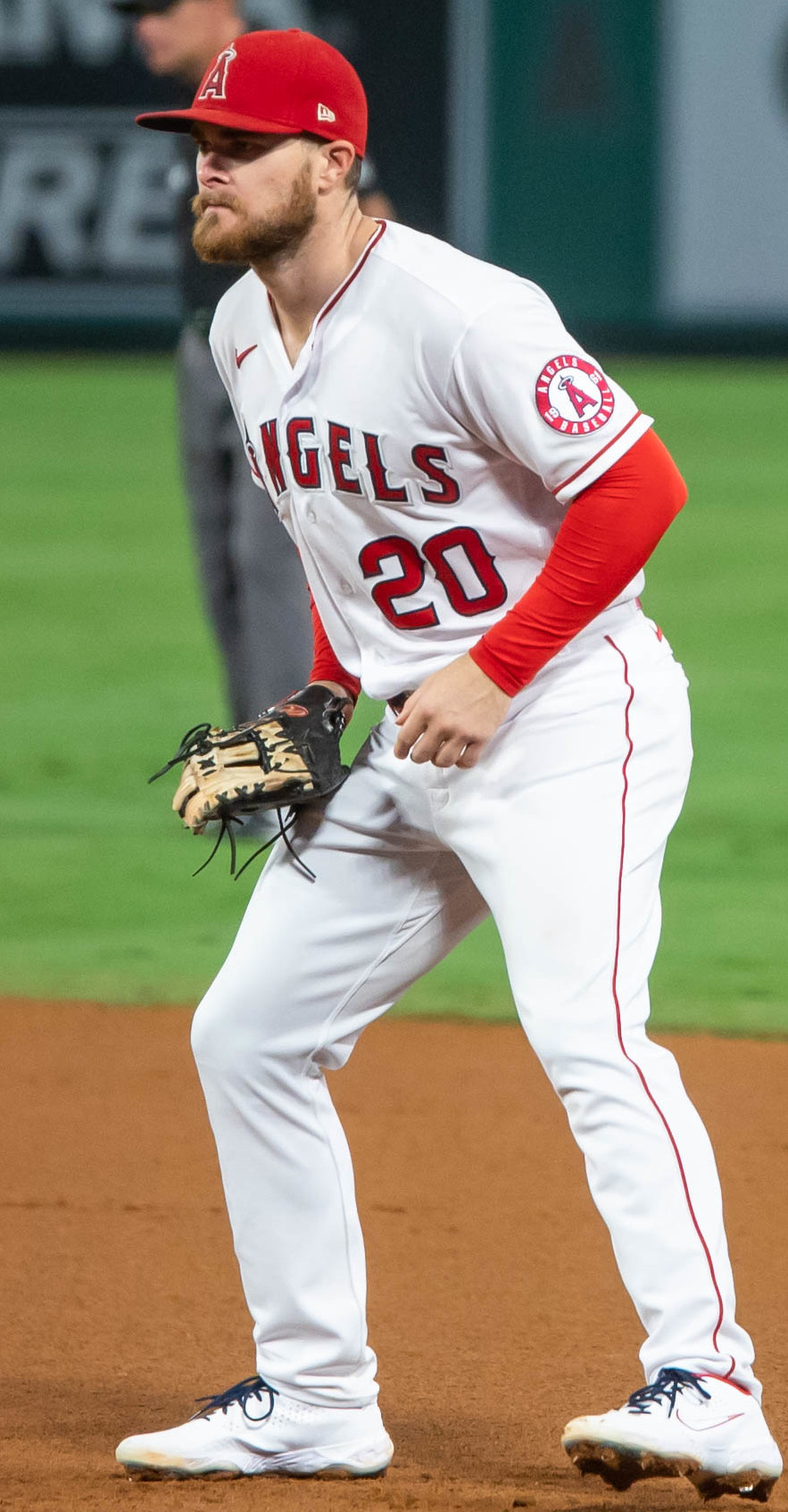
Jared Walsh hit for the cycle on June 11

On June 11, Jared Walsh hit for the cycle in an 11–6 win over the New York Mets, becoming the ninth player in Angels history to do so. He hit a single in the third inning, double in the fifth, home run in the seventh, and triple in the eighth. He was the third MLB player to hit for the cycle in 2022, after Christian Yelich and Eduardo Escobar. He raised his season batting average from .248 to .260 with his 4-for-5 performance.

During a five-game series against the Seattle Mariners in Seattle from June 16 to June 19, Mike Trout hit five home runs, four of which were game-winning. Trout became the first player in league history to hit four game-winning home runs in a single series. Trout also tied Rafael Palmeiro for the most career home runs against the Mariners with 52 and added to his record of most home runs hit by a visiting player at T-Mobile Park with 33. On June 21, Shohei Ohtani went 3-for-4 with 2 home runs and a career-high 8 RBI, including a three-run home run to tie the game at 10 in the bottom of the ninth inning. Despite his efforts, the Angels lost the game to the Kansas City Royals by a score of 12–11 in extra innings. Ohtani pitched the following day, lasting 8 innings and only allowing 2 hits in a 5–0 victory over the Royals. On June 22, Reid Detmers was optioned to the Salt Lake Bees after posting a 5.67 ERA in six starts after his no-hitter.

On June 26, Mariners batter Julio Rodríguez was hit by a pitch from Angels opener Andrew Wantz in the first inning. In the second inning, Wantz also hit Jesse Winker. Shortly after the second HBP, Winker charged the Angels dugout, causing a bench-clearing brawl. Punches were thrown and three players from each team were ejected as well as both managers for a total of eight ejections. The following night, MLB announced suspensions for involvement in the brawl: Angels manager Phil Nevin received 10 games, Anthony Rendon received 5 games, Wantz received 3 games, Raisel Iglesias received two games, and several assistant coaches received brief suspensions. For the Mariners, Winker received a 7-game suspension, J. P. Crawford received 5 games, and Rodríguez received 2 games.

=== July ===
Reid Detmers was recalled from Salt Lake and made his first start back on July 8. During his minor league stint, pitching instructor Buddy Carlyle helped Detmers tweak an error with his mechanics during a videotape session. Following the change, Detmers posted a 1.13 ERA across 24 innings in his four July starts.

Mike Trout and Shohei Ohtani were selected to represent the Angels in the 2022 MLB All-Star Game, their 10th and second career selections respectively. Trout was elected as the starter in center field but did not play as he was placed on the 10-day injured list with left ribcage inflammation. Ohtani was selected as both a designated hitter and pitcher for the second consecutive season, and fans voted him as the starting DH over Yordan Alvarez. During the game, Ohtani went 1-for-1 with a walk.

On July 31, Detmers threw an immaculate inning in the second inning of a game against the Rangers, striking out Ezequiel Durán, Kole Calhoun, and Charlie Culberson on nine pitches. He followed Sandy Koufax and Mike Fiers as the third player in MLB history to throw a no-hitter and immaculate inning in the same season and became the first to do so as a rookie.

=== August ===
On August 2, MLB's mid-season trade deadline, the Angels traded outfielder Brandon Marsh to the Philadelphia Phillies in exchange for catching prospect Logan O'Hoppe. Shortly after, the Angels completed another trade with the Phillies, sending veteran starting pitcher Noah Syndergaard in exchange for former top draft pick Mickey Moniak and prospect Jadiel Sanchez. A last-second deal sent Angels closer Raisel Iglesias to the Atlanta Braves in exchange for Jesse Chavez and Tucker Davidson, a move considered by the media to be a salary dump as Iglesias was only on the first year of the four-year, $58 million contract he had signed with the team in the previous offseason.

On August 23, Angels owner Arte Moreno formally announced that he would explore a possible sale of the franchise with preliminary media reports saying the hypothetical change in ownership was likely. In a statement, Moreno said that he decided to explore a sale after a "great deal of thoughtful consideration". At the time of the announcement, the Federal Bureau of Investigation was conducting a corruption probe for the quashed stadium property sale that prompted Anaheim mayor Harry Sidhu's resignation.

=== American League West ===
AL West
Team	W	L	Pct.	GB	Home	Road
Houston Astros	106	56	.654	—	55‍–‍26	51‍–‍30
Seattle Mariners	90	72	.556	16	46‍–‍35	44‍–‍37
Los Angeles Angels	73	89	.451	33	40‍–‍41	33‍–‍48
Texas Rangers	68	94	.420	38	34‍–‍47	34‍–‍47
Oakland Athletics	60	102	.370	46	29‍–‍51	31‍–‍51

=== American League Wild Card ===
Division leaders
Team	W	L	Pct.
Houston Astros	106	56	.654
New York Yankees	99	63	.611
Cleveland Guardians	92	70	.568

Wild Card teams (Top 3 teams qualify for postseason)
Team	W	L	Pct.	GB
Toronto Blue Jays	92	70	.568	+6
Seattle Mariners	90	72	.556	+4
Tampa Bay Rays	86	76	.531	—
Baltimore Orioles	83	79	.512	3
Chicago White Sox	81	81	.500	5
Minnesota Twins	78	84	.481	8
Boston Red Sox	78	84	.481	8
Los Angeles Angels	73	89	.451	13
Texas Rangers	68	94	.420	18
Detroit Tigers	66	96	.407	20
Kansas City Royals	65	97	.401	21
Oakland Athletics	60	102	.370	26

=== Record against opponents ===
2022 American League record Source: MLB Standings Grid – 2022
Team	BAL	BOS	CWS	CLE	DET	HOU	KC	LAA	MIN	NYY	OAK	SEA	TB	TEX	TOR	NL
Baltimore	—	9–10	5–2	3–3	1–5	4–3	4–3	6–1	3–4	7–12	3–4	2–4	9–10	6–0	9–10	12–8
Boston	10–9	—	2–4	5–2	5–1	4–2	3–4	4–3	3–4	6–13	5–1	6–1	7–12	6–1	3–16	9–11
Chicago	2–5	4–2	—	7–12	12–7	3–4	9–10	3–4	9–10	3–4	5–2	4–2	4–2	3–4	2–4	11–9
Cleveland	3–3	2–5	12–7	—	10–9	3–4	12–7	3–4	13–6	1–5	6–1	1–6	4–2	5–1	5–2	12–8
Detroit	5–1	1–5	7–12	9–10	—	0–7	10–9	3–3	8–11	1–5	2–5	1–6	2–5	4–3	2–5	11–9
Houston	3–4	2–4	4–3	4–3	7–0	—	5–2	13–6	6–0	5–2	12–7	12–7	5–1	14–5	2–4	12–8
Kansas City	3–4	4–3	10–9	7–12	9–10	2–5	—	3–3	7–12	1–6	3–3	2–4	3–4	2–4	2–5	7–13
Los Angeles	1–6	3–4	4–3	4–3	3–3	6–13	3–3	—	4–2	2–4	12–7	10–9	2–5	9–10	3–4	7–13
Minnesota	4–3	4–3	10–9	6–13	11–8	0–6	12–7	2–4	—	2–5	5–1	4–3	4–2	2–5	4–3	8–12
New York	12–7	13–6	4–3	5–1	5–1	2–5	6–1	4–2	5–2	—	5–2	2–4	11–8	4–3	11–8	10–10
Oakland	4–3	1–5	2–5	1–6	5–2	7–12	3–3	7–12	1–5	2–5	—	8–11	3–4	8–11	3–3	5–15
Seattle	4–2	1–6	2–4	6–1	6–1	7–12	4–2	9–10	3–4	4–2	11–8	—	2–5	14–5	5–2	12–8
Tampa Bay	10–9	12–7	2–4	2–4	5–2	1–5	4–3	5–2	2–4	8–11	4–3	5–2	—	4–3	10–9	12–8
Texas	0–6	1–6	4–3	1–5	3–4	5–14	4–2	10–9	5–2	3–4	11–8	5–14	3–4	—	2–4	11–9
Toronto	10–9	16–3	4–2	2–5	5–2	4–2	5–2	4–3	3–4	8–11	3–3	2–5	9–10	4–2	—	13–7

Updated with the results of all games through October 5, 2022.

=== Angels team leaders ===
Batting
Batting average†	Taylor Ward	.281
RBIs	Shohei Ohtani	95
Stolen bases	Andrew Velazquez	17
Runs scored	Shohei Ohtani	90
Home runs	Mike Trout	40
Games played	Shohei Ohtani	157
Pitching
ERA‡	Shohei Ohtani	2.33
WHIP	Shohei Ohtani	1.01
Wins	Shohei Ohtani	15
Innings pitched	Shohei Ohtani	166.0
Strikeouts	Shohei Ohtani	219
Saves	Raisel Iglesias	16
Games pitched	Aaron Loup	65

† Minimum 3.1 plate appearances per team games played ‡ Minimum 1 inning pitched per team games played

== Game log ==
The Angels were originally scheduled to open their season away at the Oakland Athletics on March 31. Due to the 2021–22 Major League Baseball lockout, the first two series of the year were postponed and played at later dates in the season. The Angels opened at home on April 7, losing 3–1 to the Houston Astros.

2022 Game Log: 73–89 (Home: 39–41; Away: 34–48)
April: 14–8 (Home: 8–5; Away: 6–3)

#	Date	Opponent	Score	Win	Loss	Save	Stadium	Attendance	Record	Streak
1	April 7	Astros	1–3	Valdez (1–0)	**Ohtani** (0–1)	Pressly (1)	**Angel Stadium**	44,723	0–1	L1
2	April 8	Astros	6–13	Montero (1–0)	**Ortega** (0–1)	—	**Angel Stadium**	42,719	0–2	L2
3	April 9	Astros	2–0	**Syndergaard** (1–0)	Verlander (0–1)	**Iglesias** (1)	**Angel Stadium**	36,139	1–2	W1
4	April 10	Astros	1–4	Urquidy (1–0)	**Suárez** (0–1)	Pressly (2)	**Angel Stadium**	41,253	1–3	L1
5	April 11	Marlins	6–2	**Lorenzen** (1–0)	Hernández (0–1)	—	**Angel Stadium**	20,480	2–3	W1
6	April 12	Marlins	4–3	**Iglesias** (1–0)	Bender (0–1)	—	**Angel Stadium**	16,132	3–3	W2
7	April 14	@ Rangers	5–10	King (1–0)	**Ohtani** (0–2)	—	Globe Life Field	21,440	3–4	L1
8	April 15	@ Rangers	9–6	**Warren** (1–0)	Allard (0–1)	**Iglesias** (2)	Globe Life Field	28,723	4–4	W1
9	April 16	@ Rangers	7–2	**Syndergaard** (2–0)	Hearn (0–1)	—	Globe Life Field	34,493	5–4	W2
10	April 17	@ Rangers	8–3	**Mayers** (1–0)	Pérez (0–2)	—	Globe Life Field	22,650	6–4	W3
11	April 18	@ Astros	3–8	García (1–0)	**Lorenzen** (1–1)	—	Minute Maid Park	42,646	6–5	L1
12	April 19	@ Astros	7–2	**Ortega** (1–1)	Valdez (1–1)	—	Minute Maid Park	30,212	7–5	W1
13	April 20	@ Astros	6–0	**Ohtani** (1–2)	Odorizzi (0–2)	—	Minute Maid Park	29,049	8–5	W2
14	April 22	Orioles	3–5	Zimmermann (1–0)	**Detmers** (0–1)	López (3)	**Angel Stadium**	31,679	8–6	L1
15	April 23	Orioles	4–5	Baker (1–0)	**Loup** (0–1)	López (4)	**Angel Stadium**	43,883	8–7	L2
16	April 24	Orioles	7–6	**Herget** (1–0)	Baumann (1–2)	**Bradley** (1)	**Angel Stadium**	41,984	9–7	W1
17	April 25	Guardians	3–0	**Lorenzen** (2–1)	Bieber (1–1)	**Iglesias** (3)	**Angel Stadium**	23,099	10–7	W2
18	April 26	Guardians	4–1	**Sandoval** (1–0)	McKenzie (0–2)	**Iglesias** (4)	**Angel Stadium**	22,551	11–7	W3
19	April 27	Guardians	9–5	**Ohtani** (2–2)	Plesac (1–2)	—	**Angel Stadium**	28,557	12–7	W4
20	April 28	Guardians	4–1	**Detmers** (1–1)	Quantrill (1–1)	**Iglesias** (5)	**Angel Stadium**	18,826	13–7	W5
21	April 29	@ White Sox	5–1	**Warren** (2–0)	Giolito (0–1)	**Iglesias** (6)	Guaranteed Rate Field	23,709	14–7	W6
22	April 30	@ White Sox	0–4	Velasquez (1–2)	**Suárez** (0–2)	—	Guaranteed Rate Field	33,762	14–8	L1

May: 13–15 (Home: 7–8; Away: 6–7)

#	Date	Opponent	Score	Win	Loss	Save	Stadium	Attendance	Record	Streak
23	May 1	@ White Sox	6–5	**Lorenzen** (3–1)	Keuchel (1–3)	**Tepera** (1)	Guaranteed Rate Field	27,664	15–8	W1
24	May 2	@ White Sox	0–3	Cease (3–1)	**Sandoval** (1–1)	Hendriks (5)	Guaranteed Rate Field	13,112	15–9	L1
25	May 3	@ Red Sox	0–4	Wacha (3–0)	**Syndergaard** (2–1)	—	Fenway Park	29,793	15–10	L2
26	May 4	@ Red Sox	10–5 (10)	**Tepera** (1–0)	Barnes (0–2)	—	Fenway Park	27,679	16–10	W1
27	May 5	@ Red Sox	8–0	**Ohtani** (3–2)	Houck (2–2)	—	Fenway Park	29,476	17–10	W2
28	May 6	Nationals	3–0	**Díaz** (1–0)	Adon (1–5)	**Iglesias** (7)	**Angel Stadium**	41,923	18–10	W3
29	May 7	Nationals	3–7	Gray (4–2)	**Lorenzen** (3–2)	—	**Angel Stadium**	30,666	18–11	L1
30	May 8	Nationals	5–4	**Barría** (1–0)	Rainey (0–1)	—	**Angel Stadium**	32,337	19–11	W1
31	May 9	Rays	11–3	**Syndergaard** (3–1)	Springs (1–1)	—	**Angel Stadium**	19,537	20–11	W2
32	May 10	Rays	12–0	**Detmers** (2–1)	Kluber (1–2)	—	**Angel Stadium**	39,313	21–11	W3
33	May 11	Rays	2–4 (10)	Feyereisen (3–0)	**Loup** (0–2)	Raley (3)	**Angel Stadium**	21,045	21–12	L1
34	May 13	@ Athletics	2–0	**Silseth** (1–0)	Jefferies (1–6)	**Iglesias** (8)	Oakland Coliseum	13,992	22–12	W1
35	May 14 (1)	@ Athletics	3–4	Trivino (1–2)	**Iglesias** (1–1)	—	Oakland Coliseum	12,719	22–13	L1
36	May 14 (2)	@ Athletics	9–1	**Lorenzen** (4–2)	Oller (0–3)	—	Oakland Coliseum	7,737	23–13	W1
37	May 15	@ Athletics	4–1	**Sandoval** (2–1)	Montas (2–4)	**Herget** (1)	Oakland Coliseum	14,668	24–13	W2
38	May 16	@ Rangers	4–7	Gray (1–1)	**Syndergaard** (3–2)	Barlow (7)	Globe Life Field	15,110	24–14	L1
39	May 17	@ Rangers	5–10	Santana (1–1)	**Tepera** (1–1)	—	Globe Life Field	17,727	24–15	L2
40	May 18	@ Rangers	5–6 (10)	Santana (2–1)	**Iglesias** (1–2)	—	Globe Life Field	20,366	24–16	L3
41	May 20	Athletics	2–4	Moll (1–0)	**Silseth** (1–1)	Jiménez (8)	**Angel Stadium**	32,422	24–17	L4
42	May 21	Athletics	5–3	**Lorenzen** (5–2)	Kolarek (0–1)	**Iglesias** (9)	**Angel Stadium**	39,045	25–17	W1
43	May 22	Athletics	4–1	**Sandoval** (3–1)	Irvin (2–2)	**Iglesias** (10)	**Angel Stadium**	40,042	26–17	W2
44	May 24	Rangers	5–3	**Syndergaard** (4–2)	Dunning (1–3)	**Iglesias** (11)	**Angel Stadium**	23,791	27–17	W3
45	May 25	Rangers	2–7	Otto (2–2)	**Detmers** (2–2)	—	**Angel Stadium**	22,950	27–18	L1
46	May 26	Blue Jays	3–6	Ryu (2–0)	**Ohtani** (3–3)	—	**Angel Stadium**	28,288	27–19	L2
47	May 27	Blue Jays	3–4	Richards (2–0)	**Iglesias** (1–3)	Romano (15)	**Angel Stadium**	44,641	27–20	L3
48	May 28	Blue Jays	5–6	Cimber (5–2)	**Barraclough** (0–1)	Stripling (1)	**Angel Stadium**	34,005	27–21	L4
49	May 29	Blue Jays	10–11	Cimber (6–2)	**Quijada** (0–1)	Phelps (1)	**Angel Stadium**	36,568	27–22	L5
50	May 31	@ Yankees	1–9	Montgomery (1–1)	**Syndergaard** (4–3)	—	Yankee Stadium	31,242	27–23	L6

June: 10–18 (Home: 6–10; Away: 4–8)

#	Date	Opponent	Score	Win	Loss	Save	Stadium	Attendance	Record	Streak
—	June 1	@ Yankees	Postponed (rain); Makeup date: June 2							
51	June 2 (1)	@ Yankees	1–6	Cortés Jr. (5–1)	**Ohtani** (3–4)	Peralta (1)	Yankee Stadium	30,518	27–24	L7
52	June 2 (2)	@ Yankees	1–2	Taillon (6–1)	**Ortega** (1–2)	Holmes (7)	Yankee Stadium	33,476	27–25	L8
53	June 3	@ Phillies	0–10	Eflin (2–4)	**Silseth** (1–2)	—	Citizens Bank Park	28,721	27–26	L9
54	June 4	@ Phillies	2–7	Wheeler (4–3)	**Lorenzen** (5–3)	—	Citizens Bank Park	36,313	27–27	L10
55	June 5	@ Phillies	7–9	Knebel (2–4)	**Iglesias** (1–4)	—	Citizens Bank Park	34,801	27–28	L11
56	June 6	Red Sox	0–1	Wacha (4–1)	**Syndergaard** (4–4)	—	**Angel Stadium**	29,395	27–29	L12
57	June 7	Red Sox	5–6 (10)	Houck (4–3)	**Barría** (1–1)	Strahm (2)	**Angel Stadium**	27,627	27–30	L13
58	June 8	Red Sox	0–1	Eovaldi (4–2)	**Herget** (1–1)	Strahm (3)	**Angel Stadium**	26,587	27–31	L14
59	June 9	Red Sox	5–2	**Ohtani** (4–4)	Pivetta (5–5)	**Iglesias** (12)	**Angel Stadium**	28,595	28–31	W1
60	June 10	Mets	3–7	Peterson (3–0)	**Díaz** (1–1)	—	**Angel Stadium**	31,499	28–32	L1
61	June 11	Mets	11–6	**Lorenzen** (6–3)	Carrasco (7–2)	—	**Angel Stadium**	36,408	29–32	W1
62	June 12	Mets	1–4	Walker (4–2)	**Sandoval** (3–2)	Díaz (12)	**Angel Stadium**	36,598	29–33	L1
63	June 14	@ Dodgers	0–2	Gonsolin (8–0)	**Syndergaard** (4–5)	Kimbrel (12)	Dodger Stadium	51,013	29–34	L2
64	June 15	@ Dodgers	1–4	Anderson (8–0)	**Detmers** (2–3)	—	Dodger Stadium	50,812	29–35	L3
65	June 16	@ Mariners	4–1	**Ohtani** (5–4)	Kirby (1–2)	**Iglesias** (13)	T-Mobile Park	21,485	30–35	W1
66	June 17	@ Mariners	1–8	Ray (6–6)	**Lorenzen** (6–4)	—	T-Mobile Park	37,500	30–36	L1
67	June 18 (1)	@ Mariners	4–2 (10)	**Iglesias** (2–4)	Castillo (3–1)	**Quijada** (1)	T-Mobile Park	24,071	31–36	W1
68	June 18 (2)	@ Mariners	3–0	**Herget** (2–1)	Milone (0–1)	**Bradley** (2)	T-Mobile Park	20,804	32–36	W2
69	June 19	@ Mariners	4–0	**Wantz** (1–0)	Gilbert (7–3)	—	T-Mobile Park	39,052	33–36	W3
70	June 20	Royals	2–6	Bubic (1–4)	**Syndergaard** (4–6)	—	**Angel Stadium**	22,234	33–37	L1
71	June 21	Royals	11–12 (11)	Coleman (2–1)	**Quijada** (0–2)	Mengden (1)	**Angel Stadium**	20,189	33–38	L2
72	June 22	Royals	5–0	**Ohtani** (6–4)	Lynch (3–7)	—	**Angel Stadium**	34,792	34–38	W1
73	June 24	Mariners	3–4	Flexen (3–8)	**Lorenzen** (6–5)	Sewald (6)	**Angel Stadium**	35,704	34–39	L1
74	June 25	Mariners	3–5	Gilbert (8–3)	**Bradley** (0–1)	Swanson (1)	**Angel Stadium**	35,466	34–40	L2
75	June 26	Mariners	2–1	**Suárez** (1–2)	Gonzales (4–8)	**Ortega** (1)	**Angel Stadium**	26,489	35–40	W1
76	June 27	White Sox	4–3	**Syndergaard** (5–6)	López (4–2)	**Iglesias** (14)	**Angel Stadium**	21,973	36–40	W2
77	June 28	White Sox	4–11	Cueto (2–4)	**Ortega** (1–3)	—	**Angel Stadium**	23,979	36–41	L1
78	June 29	White Sox	4–1	**Ohtani** (7–4)	Kopech (2–5)	**Iglesias** (15)	**Angel Stadium**	27,612	37–41	W1

July: 6–18 (Home: 2–7; Away: 4–11)

#	Date	Opponent	Score	Win	Loss	Save	Stadium	Attendance	Record	Streak
79	July 1	@ Astros	1–8	Javier (6–3)	**Lorenzen** (6–6)	—	Minute Maid Park	36,420	37–42	L1
80	July 2	@ Astros	1–9	Urquidy (7–3)	**Sandoval** (3–3)	—	Minute Maid Park	35,332	37–43	L2
81	July 3	@ Astros	2–4	Pressly (2–2)	**Tepera** (1–2)	—	Minute Maid Park	36,048	37–44	L3
82	July 5	@ Marlins	1–2	Alcántara (9–3)	**Syndergaard** (5–7)	Scott (10)	LoanDepot Park	13,338	37–45	L4
83	July 6	@ Marlins	5–2	**Ohtani** (8–4)	Rogers (4–7)	—	LoanDepot Park	18,741	38–45	W1
84	July 7	@ Orioles	1–4	Lyles (5–7)	**Silseth** (1–3)	López (15)	Camden Yards	13,088	38–46	L1
85	July 8	@ Orioles	4–5	Tate (1–3)	**Iglesias** (2–5)	—	Camden Yards	27,814	38–47	L2
86	July 9	@ Orioles	0–1	Kremer (3–1)	**Sandoval** (3–4)	López (16)	Camden Yards	32,286	38–48	L3
87	July 10	@ Orioles	5–9	Voth (1–1)	**Suárez** (1–3)	—	Camden Yards	19,521	38–49	L4
88	July 12	Astros	5–6	Neris (2–3)	**Iglesias** (2–6)	Pressly (19)	**Angel Stadium**	27,180	38–50	L5
89	July 13	Astros	7–1	**Ohtani** (9–4)	Javier (6–5)	—	**Angel Stadium**	27,803	39–50	W1
90	July 14	Astros	2–3 (10)	Pressly (3–2)	**Loup** (0–3)	—	**Angel Stadium**	34,496	39–51	L1
91	July 15	Dodgers	1–9	Kershaw (7–2)	**Sandoval** (3–5)	—	**Angel Stadium**	44,648	39–52	L2
92	July 16	Dodgers	1–7	Urías (8–6)	**Suárez** (1–4)	—	**Angel Stadium**	44,728	39–53	L3
ASG	July 19	AL @ NL	3–2	Valdez (1–0)	Gonsolin (0–1)	Clase (1)	Dodger Stadium	52,518	N/A	N/A
93	July 22	@ Braves	1–8	Lee (2–0)	**Ohtani** (9–5)	—	Truist Park	42,867	39–54	L4
94	July 23	@ Braves	2–7	Wright (12–4)	**Sandoval** (3–6)	—	Truist Park	42,827	39–55	L5
95	July 24	@ Braves	9–1	**Detmers** (3–3)	Anderson (8–6)	—	Truist Park	42,663	40–55	W1
96	July 25	@ Royals	0–7	Garrett (2–1)	**Syndergaard** (5–8)	—	Kauffman Stadium	16,616	40–56	L1
97	July 26	@ Royals	6–0	**Suárez** (2–4)	Zerpa (2–1)	—	Kauffman Stadium	20,834	41–56	W1
98	July 27	@ Royals	4–0	**Junk** (1–0)	Keller (5–11)	—	Kauffman Stadium	12,596	42–56	W2
99	July 28	Rangers	0–2	Howard (2–2)	**Ohtani** (9–6)	Moore (2)	**Angel Stadium**	29,718	42–57	L1
100	July 29	Rangers	2–7	Pérez (9–2)	**Sandoval** (3–7)	—	**Angel Stadium**	29,906	42–58	L2
101	July 30	Rangers	9–7	**Toussaint** (1–0)	Martin (0–7)	**Iglesias** (16)	**Angel Stadium**	32,968	43–58	W1
102	July 31	Rangers	2–5	Burke (5–2)	**Quijada** (0–3)	Hernández (1)	**Angel Stadium**	29,257	43–59	L1

August: 14–15 (Home: 5–7; Away: 9–8)

#	Date	Opponent	Score	Win	Loss	Save	Stadium	Attendance	Record	Streak
103	August 2	Athletics	3-1	**Suárez** (3–4)	Irvin (6–8)	**Quijada** (2)	**Angel Stadium**	22,920	44–59	W1
104	August 3	Athletics	1–3	Kaprielian (3–5)	**Ohtani** (9–7)	Jackson (3)	**Angel Stadium**	25,190	44–60	L1
105	August 4	Athletics	7–8	Blackburn (7–6)	**Junk** (1–1)	Puk (3)	**Angel Stadium**	23,849	44–61	L2
106	August 5	@ Mariners	4–3 (10)	**Chavez** (2–1)	Sewald (3–3)	**Herget** (2)	T-Mobile Park	42,654	45–61	W1
107	August 6 (1)	@ Mariners	1–2	Kirby (3–3)	**Barría** (1–2)	Swanson (3)	T-Mobile Park	41,507	45–62	L1
108	August 6 (2)	@ Mariners	7–1	**Detmers** (4–3)	Flexen (7–9)	—	T-Mobile Park	27,065	46–62	W1
109	August 7	@ Mariners	3–6	Gonzales (7–11)	**Davidson** (1–3)	Sewald (14)	T-Mobile Park	34,837	46–63	L1
110	August 8	@ Athletics	1–0	**Suárez** (4–4)	Irvin (6–9)	**Tepera** (2)	Oakland Coliseum	5,440	47–63	W1
111	August 9	@ Athletics	5–1	**Ohtani** (10–7)	Kaprielian (3–6)	—	Oakland Coliseum	9,351	48–63	W2
112	August 10	@ Athletics	5–4 (12)	**Barría** (2–2)	Pruitt (0–1)	—	Oakland Coliseum	8,268	49–63	W3
113	August 12	Twins	0–4	Mahle (6–7)	**Sandoval** (3–8)	—	**Angel Stadium**	33,459	49–64	L1
114	August 13	Twins	5–3 (11)	**Tepera** (2–2)	Pagán (3–6)	—	**Angel Stadium**	43,027	50–64	W1
115	August 14	Twins	4–2	**Davidson** (2–3)	Archer (2–6)	**Quijada** (3)	**Angel Stadium**	27,515	51–64	W2
116	August 15	Mariners	2–6	Muñoz (2–4)	**Loup** (0–4)	—	**Angel Stadium**	23,096	51–65	L1
117	August 16	Mariners	2–8	Ray (9–8)	**Suárez** (4–5)	—	**Angel Stadium**	20,294	51–66	L2
118	August 17	Mariners	7–11	Kirby (5–3)	**Toussaint** (1–1)	—	**Angel Stadium**	19,550	51–67	L3
119	August 19	@ Tigers	1–0	**Sandoval** (4–8)	Manning (0–1)	—	Comerica Park	28,197	52–67	W1
120	August 20	@ Tigers	3–4	Alexander (3–7)	**Detmers** (4–4)	Soto (23)	Comerica Park	23,581	52–68	L1
121	August 21	@ Tigers	0–4	Rodríguez (2–3)	**Ohtani** (10–8)	—	Comerica Park	23,064	52–69	L2
122	August 22	@ Rays	1–2	Springs (6–3)	**Davidson** (2–4)	Armstrong (1)	Tropicana Field	9,942	52–70	L3
123	August 23	@ Rays	1–11	Kluber (8–7)	**Suárez** (4–6)	—	Tropicana Field	8,810	52–71	L4
124	August 24	@ Rays	3–4 (11)	Chargois (1–0)	**Barría** (2–3)	—	Tropicana Field	9,763	52–72	L5
125	August 25	@ Rays	3–8	Rasmussen (9–4)	**Sandoval** (4–9)	—	Tropicana Field	10,733	52–73	L6
126	August 26	@ Blue Jays	12–0	**Detmers** (5–4)	White (1–4)	—	Rogers Centre	40,754	53–73	W1
127	August 27	@ Blue Jays	2–0	**Ohtani** (11–8)	Manoah (12–7)	**Herget** (3)	Rogers Centre	45,311	54–73	W2
128	August 28	@ Blue Jays	8–3	**Wantz** (2–0)	Stripling (6–4)	—	Rogers Centre	44,318	55–73	W3
129	August 29	Yankees	4–3	**Suárez** (5–6)	Montas (4–11)	**Herget** (4)	**Angel Stadium**	44,537	56–73	W4
130	August 30	Yankees	4–7	Weissert (1–0)	**Mayers** (1–1)	—	**Angel Stadium**	42,684	56–74	L1
131	August 31	Yankees	3–2	**Sandoval** (5–9)	Cole (10–7)	**Herget** (5)	**Angel Stadium**	43,555	57–74	W1

September: 14–12 (Home: 10–4; Away: 4–8)

#	Date	Opponent	Score	Win	Loss	Save	Stadium	Attendance	Record	Streak
132	September 2	Astros	2–4	McCullers Jr. (2–1)	**Detmers** (5–5)	Montero (11)	**Angel Stadium**	22,464	57–75	L1
133	September 3	Astros	2–1 (12)	**Tepera** (3–2)	Martinez (0–2)	—	**Angel Stadium**	38,244	58–75	W1
134	September 4	Astros	1–9	Urquidy (13–5)	**Davidson** (2–5)	—	**Angel Stadium**	28,179	58–76	L1
135	September 5	Tigers	10–0	**Suárez** (6–6)	Alexander (3–9)	—	**Angel Stadium**	19,518	59–76	W1
136	September 6	Tigers	5–4 (10)	**Tepera** (4–2)	Chafin (1–3)	—	**Angel Stadium**	20,002	60–76	W2
137	September 7	Tigers	4–5	Cisnero (1–0)	**Quijada** (0–4)	Soto (25)	**Angel Stadium**	15,756	60–77	L1
138	September 9	@ Astros	3–4	McCullers Jr. (3–1)	**Wantz** (2–1)	Pressly (26)	Minute Maid Park	33,509	60–78	L2
139	September 10	@ Astros	6–1	**Ohtani** (12–8)	Urquidy (13–6)	—	Minute Maid Park	38,533	61–78	W1
140	September 11	@ Astros	4–12	García (12–8)	**Davidson** (2–6)	—	Minute Maid Park	32,901	61–79	L1
141	September 12	@ Guardians	4–5	De Los Santos (4–0)	**Loup** (0–5)	Clase (34)	Progressive Field	12,461	61–80	L2
142	September 13	@ Guardians	1–3	McCarty (3–2)	**Suárez** (6–7)	Clase (35)	Progressive Field	14,419	61–81	L3
143	September 14	@ Guardians	3–5	Stephan (5–4)	**Tepera** (4–3)	Karinchak (3)	Progressive Field	14,529	61–82	L4
144	September 16	Mariners	8–7	**Lorenzen** (7–6)	Ray (12–10)	**Tepera** (3)	**Angel Stadium**	37,480	62–82	W1
145	September 17	Mariners	2–1	**Ohtani** (13–8)	Kirby (7–4)	**Loup** (1)	**Angel Stadium**	35,538	63–82	W2
146	September 18	Mariners	5–1	**Detmers** (6–5)	Gonzales (10–14)	—	**Angel Stadium**	24,929	64–82	W3
147	September 19	Mariners	1–9	Gilbert (13–5)	**Suárez** (6–8)	—	**Angel Stadium**	15,594	64–83	L1
148	September 20	@ Rangers	5–2	**Sandoval** (6–9)	Santana (3–8)	**Herget** (6)	Globe Life Field	19,472	65–83	W1
149	September 21	@ Rangers	2–7	Dunning (4–8)	**Davidson** (2–7)	—	Globe Life Field	20,959	65–84	L1
150	September 22	@ Rangers	3–5	Moore (5–2)	**Quijada** (0–5)	Leclerc (7)	Globe Life Field	16,223	65–85	L2
151	September 23	@ Twins	4–2	**Ohtani** (14–8)	Varland (0–2)	**Tepera** (4)	Target Field	24,896	66–85	W1
152	September 24	@ Twins	4–8	Jax (7–3)	**Detmers** (6–6)	—	Target Field	30,959	66–86	L1
153	September 25	@ Twins	10–3	**Suárez** (7–8)	Bundy (8–8)	—	Target Field	24,133	67–86	W1
154	September 27	Athletics	4–3	**Tepera** (5–3)	Puk (3–3)	**Herget** (7)	**Angel Stadium**	19,374	68–86	W2
155	September 28	Athletics	4–1	**Lorenzen** (8–6)	Martínez (4–6)	**Herget** (8)	**Angel Stadium**	23,573	69–86	W3
156	September 29	Athletics	4–2	**Ohtani** (15–8)	Irvin (9–13)	**Tepera** (5)	**Angel Stadium**	31,293	70–86	W4
157	September 30	Rangers	4–1	**Detmers** (7–6)	Otto (6–10)	**Herget** (9)	**Angel Stadium**	32,939	71–86	W5

October: 2–3 (Home: 2–0; Away: 0–3)

#	Date	Opponent	Score	Win	Loss	Save	Stadium	Attendance	Record	Streak
158	October 1	Rangers	3–2	**Suárez** (8–8)	Hernández (2–3)	**Tepera** (6)	**Angel Stadium**	32,472	72–86	W6
159	October 2	Rangers	8–3	**Barría** (3–3)	Miller (1–2)	—	**Angel Stadium**	26,041	73–86	W7
160	October 3	@ Athletics	4–5 (10)	Acevedo (4–4)	**Weiss** (0–1)	—	Oakland Coliseum	6,978	73–87	L1
161	October 4	@ Athletics	1–2 (10)	Puk (4–3)	**Tepera** (5–4)	—	Oakland Coliseum	8,189	73–88	L2
162	October 5	@ Athletics	2–3	Waldichuk (2–2)	**Ohtani** (15–9)	Snead (1)	Oakland Coliseum	11,232	73–89	L3

Legend: = Win = Loss = Postponement
Bold = Angels team member

== Roster ==
2022 Los Angeles Angels
Roster
Pitchers: 49 Kyle Barraclough; 51 Jaime Barría; 23 Archie Bradley; 40 Jesse Chavez; 32 Tucker Davidson; 48 Reid Detmers; 74 Jhonathan Díaz; 46 Jimmy Herget; 32 Raisel Iglesias; 66 Janson Junk; 25 Michael Lorenzen; 28 Aaron Loup; 68 José Marte; 21 Mike Mayers; 58 Brian Moran; 17 Shohei Ohtani; 62 Oliver Ortega; 59 Elvis Peguero; 65 José Quijada; 64 Gerardo Reyes; 53 Kenny Rosenberg; 43 Patrick Sandoval; 63 Chase Silseth; 54 José Suárez; 34 Noah Syndergaard; 52 Ryan Tepera; 56 Touki Toussaint; 67 César Valdez; 60 Andrew Wantz; 61 Austin Warren; 57 Zack Weiss; 40 Rob Zastryzny	Catchers: 14 Logan O'Hoppe; 19 Austin Romine; 33 Max Stassi; 24 Kurt Suzuki; 12 Matt Thaiss; 35 Chad Wallach; Infielders: 5 Matt Duffy; 22 David Fletcher; 36 Mike Ford; 14 Phil Gosselin; 39 David MacKinnon; 9 Jack Mayfield; 6 Anthony Rendon; 2 Luis Rengifo; 18 José Rojas; 13 Liván Soto; 38 Michael Stefanic; 4 Andrew Velazquez; 19 Jonathan Villar; 14 Tyler Wade; 20 Jared Walsh	Outfielders: 7 Jo Adell; 39 Ryan Aguilar; 8 Steven Duggar; 13 Monte Harrison; 10 Juan Lagares; 16 Brandon Marsh; 16 Mickey Moniak; 37 Magneuris Sierra; 10,39 Dillon Thomas; 27 Mike Trout; 3 Taylor Ward; 44 Aaron Whitefield	Manager: 70 Joe Maddon; 88 Phil Nevin; Coaches: 91 Mike Ashman (batting practice pitcher); 93 Jason Brown (staff assistant); 90 Tim Buss (quality assurance); 95 Drew Butera (bullpen catcher); 84 Dom Chiti (bullpen); 86 Mike Gallego (third base); 80 Damon Mashore (first base); 82 Bill Haselman (catching); 85 John Mallee (assistant hitting); 94 Ali Modami (staff assistant); 81 Ray Montgomery (bench); 88 Phil Nevin (third base); 77 Jeremy Reed (hitting); 87 Paul Sorrento (hitting instructor); 83 Matt Wise (pitching)

== Player stats ==
=== Batting ===
Note: G = Games played; AB = At bats; R = Runs; 2B = Doubles; 3B = Triples; HR = Home runs; RBI = Runs batted in; SB = Stolen bases; BB = Walks; AVG = Batting average; SLG = Slugging average

Player	G	AB	R	H	2B	3B	HR	RBI	SB	BB	AVG	SLG
Shohei Ohtani	157	586	90	160	30	6	34	95	11	72	.273	.519
Taylor Ward	135	495	73	139	22	2	23	65	5	60	.281	.473
Luis Rengifo	127	489	45	129	22	4	17	52	6	17	.264	.429
Mike Trout	119	438	85	124	28	2	40	80	1	54	.283	.630
Jared Walsh	118	423	41	91	18	2	15	44	2	27	.215	.374
Max Stassi	102	333	32	60	12	1	9	30	0	38	.180	.303
Andrew Velazquez	125	322	37	63	8	0	9	28	17	15	.196	.304
Brandon Marsh	93	292	34	66	9	2	8	37	8	22	.226	.353
Jo Adell	88	268	22	60	12	2	8	27	4	11	.224	.373
Matt Duffy	77	228	14	57	8	0	2	16	0	17	.250	.311
Anthony Rendon	47	166	15	38	10	0	5	24	2	23	.229	.380
Tyler Wade	67	147	22	32	5	0	1	8	8	10	.218	.272
Kurt Suzuki	51	139	10	25	4	0	4	15	0	15	.180	.295
Mike Ford	28	91	8	21	4	0	3	5	0	8	.231	.374
Magneuris Sierra	45	91	7	15	1	3	0	5	6	4	.165	.242
Jack Mayfield	23	70	8	13	1	1	1	6	1	3	.186	.271
Matt Thaiss	29	69	9	15	1	0	2	8	1	11	.217	.319
Michael Stefanic	25	61	5	12	2	0	0	0	0	5	.197	.230
Juan Lagares	20	60	4	11	2	1	0	0	0	2	.183	.250
Mickey Moniak	19	60	9	12	2	1	3	6	1	1	.200	.417
José Rojas	22	56	1	7	2	0	0	1	0	0	.125	.161
Liván Soto	18	55	9	22	5	1	1	9	1	2	.400	.582
Phil Gosselin	22	51	2	5	0	1	0	2	0	1	.098	.137
Jonathan Villar	13	49	6	8	0	0	1	3	1	4	.163	.224
David MacKinnon	16	37	0	7	0	0	0	6	0	5	.189	.189
Chad Wallach	12	35	3	5	1	0	1	4	0	4	.143	.257
Ryan Aguilar	7	22	2	3	1	0	0	2	0	2	.136	.182
Steven Duggar	9	19	3	1	0	1	0	0	0	3	.053	.158
Logan O'Hoppe	5	14	1	4	0	0	0	2	0	2	.286	.286
Dillon Thomas	8	11	1	1	0	0	0	0	0	2	.091	.091
Monte Harrison	9	11	5	2	0	0	1	3	1	2	.182	.455
Aaron Whitefield	5	11	0	0	0	0	0	0	0	0	.000	.000
Austin Romine	3	8	0	2	0	0	0	0	0	0	.250	.250
Team totals	162	5423	623	1265	219	31	190	600	77	449	.233	.390

=== Pitching ===
Note: W = Wins; L = Losses; ERA = Earned run average; G = Games pitched; GS = Games started; SV = Saves; IP = Innings pitched; H = Hits allowed; R = Runs allowed; ER = Earned runs allowed; BB = Walks allowed; SO = Strikeouts

Player	W	L	ERA	G	GS	SV	IP	H	R	ER	BB	SO
Shohei Ohtani	15	9	2.33	28	28	0	166.0	124	45	43	44	219
Patrick Sandoval	6	9	2.91	27	27	0	148.2	139	56	48	60	151
Reid Detmers	7	6	3.77	25	25	0	129.0	110	56	54	46	122
José Suárez	8	8	3.96	22	20	0	109.0	103	49	48	33	103
Michael Lorenzen	8	6	4.24	18	18	0	97.2	81	48	46	44	85
Noah Syndergaard	5	8	3.83	15	15	0	80.0	75	36	34	22	64
Jaime Barría	3	3	2.61	35	1	0	79.1	63	29	23	19	54
Jimmy Herget	2	1	2.48	49	1	9	69.0	48	20	19	15	63
Aaron Loup	0	5	3.84	65	0	1	58.2	54	38	25	22	52
Ryan Tepera	5	4	3.61	59	0	6	57.1	42	27	23	20	47
Mike Mayers	1	1	5.68	24	3	0	50.2	52	35	32	18	45
Andrew Wantz	2	1	3.22	42	1	0	50.1	37	19	18	21	52
José Quijada	0	5	3.98	42	0	3	40.2	25	19	18	21	52
Tucker Davidson	1	5	6.87	8	8	0	36.2	39	28	28	22	23
Raisel Iglesias	2	6	4.04	39	0	16	35.2	29	18	16	9	48
Oliver Ortega	1	3	3.71	27	0	1	34.0	32	18	14	18	33
Chase Silseth	1	3	6.59	7	7	0	28.2	33	21	21	12	24
Touki Toussaint	1	1	4.62	8	2	0	25.1	15	13	13	19	26
Archie Bradley	0	1	4.82	21	0	2	18.2	17	13	10	7	15
Elvis Peguero	0	0	6.75	13	0	0	17.1	23	16	13	5	12
Austin Warren	2	0	5.63	14	0	0	16.0	19	10	10	5	9
Jhonathan Díaz	1	1	2.93	4	3	0	15.1	13	5	5	10	11
Zack Weiss	0	1	3.38	12	0	0	13.1	7	6	5	7	18
José Marte	0	0	7.36	11	0	0	11.0	8	9	9	18	15
Kenny Rosenberg	0	0	4.22	3	1	0	10.2	9	5	5	6	8
Jesse Chavez	1	0	7.59	11	0	0	10.2	15	12	9	4	10
Kyle Barraclough	0	1	3.00	8	0	0	9.0	7	3	3	4	9
Janson Junk	1	1	6.48	3	2	0	8.1	10	6	6	3	11
Rob Zastryzny	0	0	6.00	5	0	0	3.0	2	3	2	1	2
Gerardo Reyes	0	0	4.50	2	0	0	2.0	3	1	1	3	0
Phil Gosselin	0	0	0.00	1	0	0	1.0	0	0	0	0	0
César Valdez	0	0	9.00	1	0	0	1.0	2	2	1	0	0
Jack Mayfield	0	0	0.00	1	0	0	1.0	1	0	0	0	0
Nash Walters	0	0	0.00	1	0	0	0.1	1	0	0	1	0
Brian Moran	0	0	54.00	1	0	0	0.1	3	2	2	1	0
Team totals	73	89	3.77	162	162	38	1435.2	1241	668	601	540	1383

== Farm system ==
Level	Team	League	Manager
AAA	Salt Lake Bees	Pacific Coast League	
AA	Rocket City Trash Pandas	Southern League	
A	Tri-City Dust Devils	Northwest League	'
A-Advanced	Inland Empire 66ers	California League	
Rookie	ACL Angels	Arizona Complex League	
Rookie	DSL Angels	Dominican Summer League	

All coaches and rosters can be found on each team's website.

=== Major League Baseball draft ===
Below are the Angels' picks from 2022 Major League Baseball draft. Players who reached MLB are in bold.

Los Angeles Angels 2022 Draft Picks

Round	Pick	Name	Age	Position	School	Signing bonus
1	13	**Zach Neto**	21	SS	Campbell University	$3,500,000
2	Forfeited for signing Noah Syndergaard					
3	89	**Ben Joyce**	21	P	University of Tennessee	$1,000,000
4	118	Jake Madden	20	P	Northwest Florida State College	$997,500
5	148	Sonny DiChiara	21	1B	Auburn University	$172,500
6	178	**Victor Mederos**	21	P	Oklahoma State University	$227,750
7	208	Roman Phansalkar	24	P	Oklahoma State University	$27,500
8	238	Dylan Phillips	23	P	Kansas State University	$7,500
9	268	Joe Stewart	24	OF	University of Michigan	$7,500
10	298	Matt Coutney	22	1B	Old Dominion University	$7,500
11	328	**Caden Dana**	18	P	Don Bosco Preparatory High School (NJ)	$1,497,500
12	358	Jared Southard	21	P	University of Texas at Austin	$137,500
13	388	Tucker Flint	21	OF	Chipola College	$132,500
14	418	Sabin Ceballos	19	3B	San Jacinto College (TX)	Not signed
15	448	Bryce Osmond	21	P	Oklahoma State University	$129,500
16	478	Casey Dana	23	OF	University of Connecticut	$125,000
17	508	**Samy Natera Jr.**	22	P	New Mexico State University	$125,000
18	538	Max Gieg	21	P	Boston College	$125,000
19	568	Luke Franzoni	22	OF	Xavier University	$75,000
20	598	Brendan Tinsman	23	C	Wake Forest University	$25,000

== See also ==
- Los Angeles Angels
- Angel Stadium

Records
Preceded by 2021	Los Angeles Angels seasons 2022	Succeeded by 2023
