= Jimmy Herget =

American baseball player (born 1993)

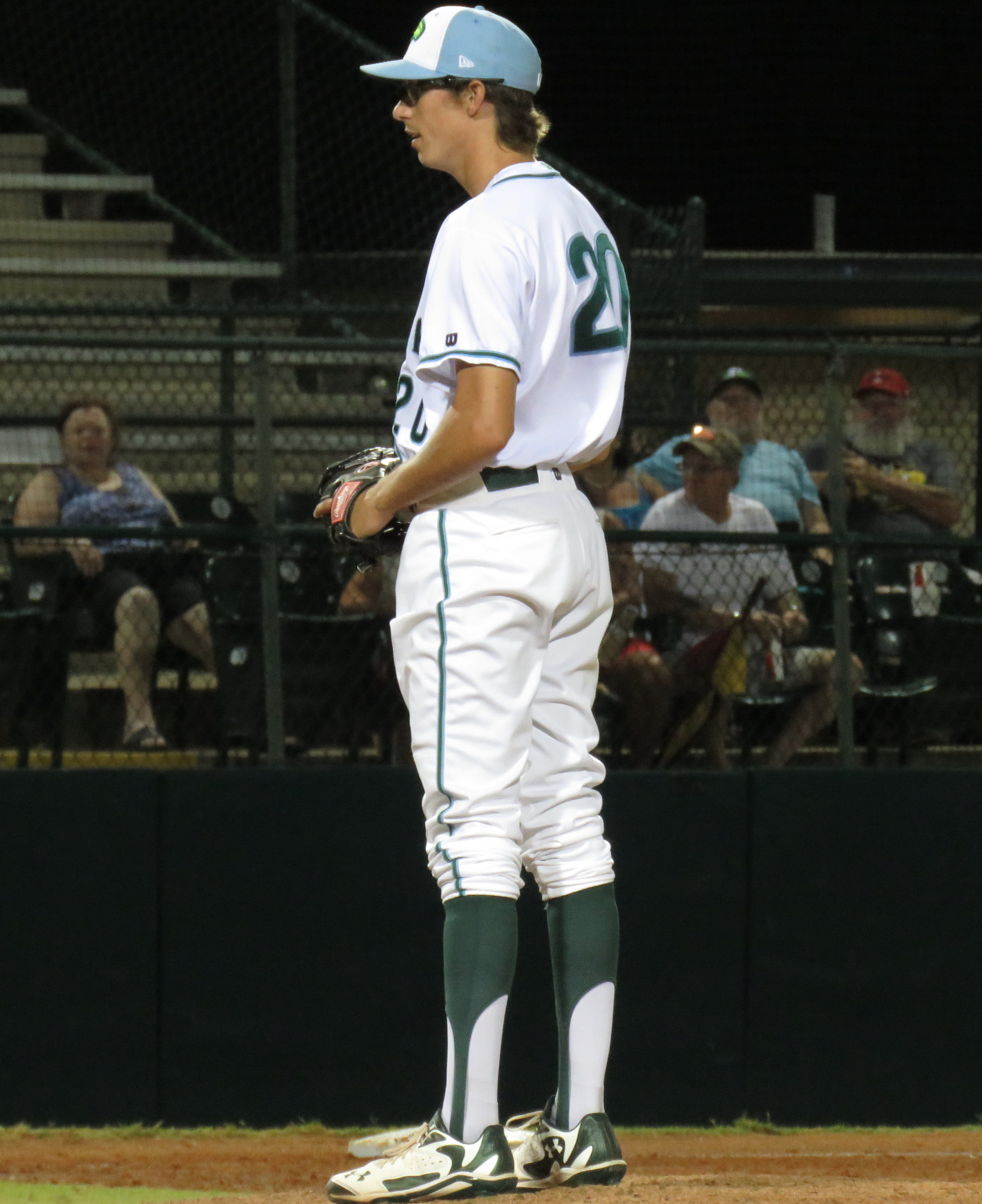
- Herget with the Daytona Tortugas in 2016

Free agent
- Pitcher
- Born: September 9, 1993 (age 33); Tampa, Florida, U.S.
- Bats: Right Throws: Right

MLB debut
- July 7, 2019, for the Cincinnati Reds

MLB statistics (through 2026 season)
- Win–loss record: 8–17
- Earned run average: 3.64
- Strikeouts: 269
- Stats at Baseball Reference

Teams
- Cincinnati Reds (2019); Texas Rangers (2020–2021); Los Angeles Angels (2021–2023); Atlanta Braves (2024); Colorado Rockies (2025–2026)

Jimmy Matthew Herget (/ˈhərɡɛt/ HER-get; born September 9, 1993) is an American professional baseball pitcher who is a free agent. He has previously played in Major League Baseball (MLB) for the Cincinnati Reds, Texas Rangers, Los Angeles Angels,Atlanta Braves, and Colorado Rockies.

== Amateur career ==
Herget attended Jefferson High School in Tampa, Florida, where he was an outfielder on the baseball team. The Atlanta Braves selected him in the 40th round of the 2012 MLB draft. He did not sign and attended the University of South Florida to play college baseball for the South Florida Bulls. In 2013, he had the second-lowest earned run average in the Big East Conference. The next two years, he was an All-American Athletic Conference first team pitcher. In 2015, as a junior, he went 10–3 with a 2.92 ERA in 17 games (16 starts).

In 2014, Herget played collegiate summer baseball with the Bourne Braves of the Cape Cod Baseball League.

== Professional career ==
=== Cincinnati Reds ===
The Cincinnati Reds selected Herget in the 22nd round of the 2015 MLB draft. He made his professional debut with the Billings Mustangs, with a 3–0 record, 3.20 ERA, and 26 strikeouts over 25 1/3 innings in 2015. In 2016, he played for the Daytona Tortugas where he compiled a 4–4 record, 1.78 ERA, and 83 strikeouts in 60 2/3 innings. He was a Florida State League All-Star. In 2017, he played for both the Pensacola Blue Wahoos and Louisville Bats, pitching to a combined 4–4 record with a 2.90 ERA and 72 strikeouts over 62 innings. He was selected for the All-Star Futures Game in July. He returned to Louisville in 2018, going 1–3 with a 3.47 ERA and 65 strikeouts over 59 2/3 innings. The Reds added Herget to their 40-man roster after the season.

Herget returned to Louisville to begin 2019, going 3–4 with a 2.91 ERA and 68 strikeouts over 58 2/3 innings. On July 1, the Reds promoted Herget to the major leagues. He made his debut on July 7, allowing 3 runs in 2/3 innings pitched. He pitched 6 1/3 innings for the Reds in 2019, posting a 4.26 ERA. Herget was designated for assignment on November 25.

=== Texas Rangers ===
On December 2, 2019, Herget was claimed off waivers by the Texas Rangers. He was again designated for assignment on December 21. He was outrighted to the minors on January 9, 2020. On July 31, Herget's contract was selected to the 40-man roster. He earned his first MLB win on September 26 after blowing a save. In the shortened season, he went 1–0 with a 3.20 ERA in 20 games. On December 2, Herget was non-tendered by Texas. On December 11, Herget signed a major league deal with the Rangers. On February 16, 2021, Herget was designated for assignment again after Texas acquired Josh Sborz. On February 20, Herget was outrighted and invited to spring training as a non-roster invitee. On August 1, Texas selected his contact to the active roster, after he opened the season with the Round Rock Express. After giving up 4 runs in 4 innings pitched, Herget was designated for assignment on August 13. He became a free agent on August 15.

=== Los Angeles Angels ===
On August 16, 2021, Herget signed a minor league contract with the Los Angeles Angels. He was then assigned to the Triple-A Salt Lake Bees. After making 4 appearances with Salt Lake, going 0–1 with a 13.50 ERA and 5 strikeouts, the Angels selected Herget's contract on August 31. He had a 2.48 ERA with nine saves in 69 innings while working almost exclusively out of the bullpen in 2022.

Herget made 29 appearances for the Angels in 2023, registering a 2–4 record and 4.66 ERA with 26 strikeouts across 29 innings pitched. He also pitched in 25 games in Triple-A. He was optioned to Triple-A Salt Lake to begin the 2024 season. On April 28, Herget was designated for assignment following the promotion of Zac Kristofak.

=== Atlanta Braves ===
On May 2, 2024, Herget was traded to the Atlanta Braves in exchange for cash and assigned to the Triple-A Gwinnett Stripers. On May 25, he was recalled to the majors, making his Braves debut later that day, pitching a scoreless inning with two strikeouts against the Pittsburgh Pirates. In 8 games for the Braves, Herget had a 4.38 ERA with 15 strikeouts over 12 1/3 innings pitched. He was designated for assignment by Atlanta on September 11.

=== Chicago Cubs ===
On September 13, 2024, Herget was claimed off waivers by the Chicago Cubs. He made four scoreless appearances for the Triple-A Iowa Cubs, striking out five batters in 4 1/3 innings pitched. Herget was designated for assignment by Chicago on November 4.

=== Colorado Rockies ===
On November 8, 2024, Herget was claimed off waivers by the Colorado Rockies. In 2025, he pitched in a career-high 83 1/3 innings and 59 games, going 1–2 with a 2.48 ERA. After the successful season, Herget said he was considering converting to a starting pitcher. In 2026, he appeared in 51 games (three starts) and had a 0–6 record, a 5.70 ERA, and 47 strikeouts across 53 2/3 innings.

On November 20, 2026, Herget was designated for assignment by the Rockies and elected free agency.

== Pitching style ==
Herget's unconventional sidearm delivery and high spin rate have generated a curveball and sinker which both have effective horizontal movement. The frisbee-like action of his pitches has earned him the nickname "The Human Glitch" from Rob Friedman.
