= José Quijada (baseball) =

Venezuelan baseball player (born 1995)

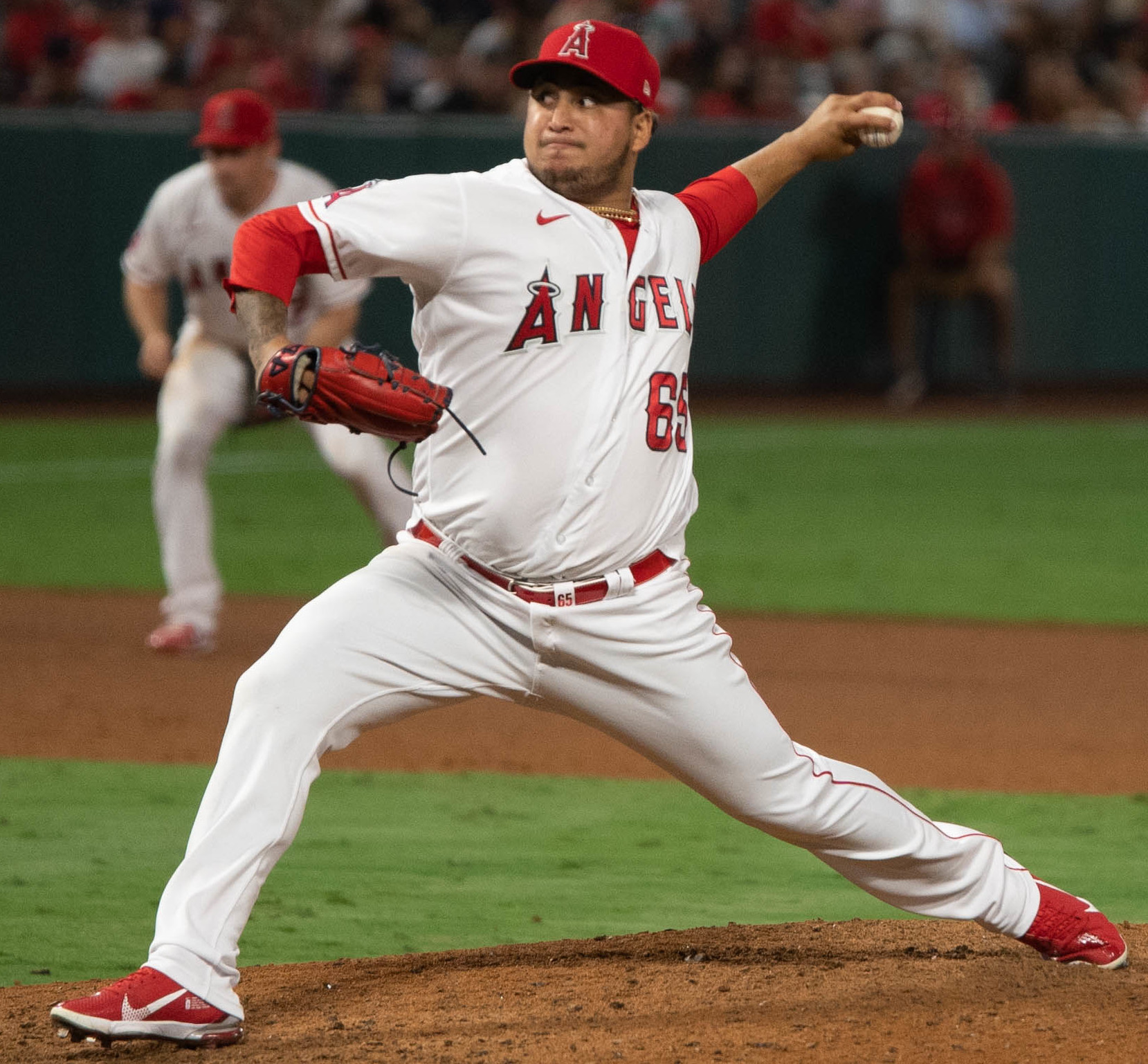
- Quijada with the Los Angeles Angels in 2021

Tokyo Yakult Swallows – No. 11
- Pitcher
- Born: November 9, 1995 (age 30); Caripito, Venezuela
- Bats: Left Throws: Left

Professional debut
- MLB: April 24, 2019, for the Miami Marlins
- NPB: March 27, 2026, for the Tokyo Yakult Swallows

MLB statistics (through 2025 season)
- Win–loss record: 4–14
- Earned run average: 4.59
- Strikeouts: 175

NPB statistics (through August 18, 2026)
- Win–loss record: 2–7
- Earned run average: 3.89
- Strikeouts: 53
- Saves: 21
- Stats at Baseball Reference

Teams
- Miami Marlins (2019); Los Angeles Angels (2020–2025); Tokyo Yakult Swallows (2026–present)

José Gregorio Quijada (born November 9, 1995) is a Venezuelan professional baseball pitcher for the Tokyo Yakult Swallows of the Nippon Professional Baseball (NPB). He has previously played in Major League Baseball (MLB) for the Miami Marlins and Los Angeles Angels.

== Professional career ==
=== Miami Marlins ===
Quijada was signed as an international free agent by the Miami Marlins on September 9, 2013. He made his professional debut in 2014 for the Rookie-level Dominican Summer League Marlins, going 5–5 with a 2.91 ERA in 74 innings. In 2015, he pitched 8 innings for the Rookie-level Gulf Coast League Marlins, going 0–0 with a 0.00 ERA. He split the 2016 season between the Class A Greensboro Grasshoppers and the Class A-Advanced Jupiter Hammerheads, accumulating a 5–2 record with a 2.32 ERA over 50 innings. His 2017 was split between Jupiter and the Double-A Jacksonville Jumbo Shrimp, accumulating a 5–1 record with a 3.23 ERA over 55.2 innings. He split his 2018 season between Jacksonville and the Triple-A New Orleans Baby Cakes, going 2–6 with a 3.00 ERA over 62.1 innings.

The Marlins added him to their 40-man roster after the 2018 season. He opened the 2019 season with New Orleans. On April 23, he was promoted to the major league roster for the first time. He made his major league debut on April 24, pitching 2/3 of an inning in relief. His first decision was a loss to the Chicago Cubs on May 8 that year; he allowed a walk-off solo home run to Jason Heyward in the 11th inning. He was optioned to New Orleans three days later. On February 3, 2020, Quijada was designated for assignment by the Marlins.

=== Los Angeles Angels ===
On February 10, 2020, Quijada was claimed off waivers by the Los Angeles Angels. On September 11, Quijada surrendered a walk-off grand slam to Charlie Blackmon of the Colorado Rockies. On the year, Quijada pitched to a 7.36 ERA with 6 strikeouts in 3 2/3 innings pitched.

On July 30, 2021, the Angels recalled Quijada from the Triple-A Salt Lake Bees. On October 1, in a game against a Seattle Mariners team attempting to make the playoffs for the first time in 20 years, Quijada entered the game with baserunners on first and third and no outs. He proceeded to strike out all three batters, thwarting an opportunity for Seattle to take the lead and win the game, greatly hurting the team's chances of making the playoffs. In 2021, Quijada made 26 appearances, posting an 0–2 record, 4.56 ERA, and 25 2/3 innings pitched.

In 2022, Quijada pitched in 42 games for the Angels, registering a 3.98 ERA with 52 strikeouts and 3 saves in 40 2/3 innings of work. For the 2023 season, Quijada made 10 appearances, struggling to a 6.00 ERA with 8 strikeouts and 4 saves before he was placed on the injured list on April 29, 2023. On May 3, it was announced that Quijada would require Tommy John surgery, ending his season.

Quijada was activated from the injured list on July 22, 2024, in order to make his return from surgery. In 22 appearances for the Angels, he compiled a 2-2 record and 3.26 ERA with 24 strikeouts across 19 1/3 innings pitched.

On March 25, 2025, Quijada was designated for assignment by the Angels. He cleared waivers and was sent outright to Triple-A Salt Lake on March 30. In 27 appearances for the Double-A Rocket City Trash Pandas, Quijada compiled a 2-1 record and 2.73 ERA with 39 strikeouts across 26 1/3 innings pitched. On July 24, the Angels added Quijada back to their active roster. He made two scoreless appearances for the Angels before being designated for assignment on July 30. Quijada cleared waivers and was sent outright to Triple-A Salt Lake on August 4. He elected free agency on October 3.

=== Tokyo Yakult Swallows ===
On December 19, 2025, Quijada signed with the Tokyo Yakult Swallows of the Nippon Professional Baseball.
