= Oliver Ortega =

Dominican baseball player (born 1996)

Sultanes de Monterrey – No. 44
- Pitcher
- Born: October 2, 1996 (age 29); Nagua, Dominican Republic
- Bats: Right Throws: Right

MLB debut
- September 8, 2021, for the Los Angeles Angels

MLB statistics (through 2023 season)
- Win–loss record: 2–4
- Earned run average: 4.03
- Strikeouts: 51
- Stats at Baseball Reference

Teams
- Los Angeles Angels (2021–2022); Minnesota Twins (2023)

Oliver Ortega (born October 2, 1996) is a Dominican professional baseball pitcher for the Sultanes de Monterrey of the Mexican League. He has previously played in Major League Baseball (MLB) for the Los Angeles Angels and Minnesota Twins.

== Professional career ==
=== Los Angeles Angels ===
Ortega signed with the Los Angeles Angels as an international free agent on February 10, 2015. He spent the 2015 season with the DSL Angels, going 1–3 with a 4.33 ERA over 43 2/3 innings. He spent the 2016 season with the AZL Angels, going 2–3 with a 2.83 ERA over 28 2/3 innings. Ortega did not appear in a game in 2017. He spent the 2018 season with the Burlington Bees, going 4–5 with a 3.51 ERA over 82 innings.

Ortega split the 2019 season between the Inland Empire 66ers and the Mobile BayBears, going a combined 4–5 with a 3.34 ERA and 121 strikeouts over 94 1/3 innings. Ortega was a 2019 California League All-Star. He did not play in a game in 2020 due to the cancellation of the minor league season because of the COVID-19 pandemic.

Ortega received his first promotion to the major leagues when the Angels selected his contract from Triple-A Salt Lake on September 1, 2021. He made his major league debut on September 8, tossing 1 1/3 scoreless innings of relief against the San Diego Padres.

On June 26, 2022, Ortega recorded his first major league save, pitching the final two innings of a 2–1 victory over the Seattle Mariners. He was designated for assignment on December 22, following the signing of Brandon Drury.

=== Minnesota Twins ===
On January 6, 2023, Ortega was claimed off waivers by the Minnesota Twins. On January 10, Ortega was designated for assignment by Minnesota following the acquisition of A. J. Alexy. On January 17, Ortega cleared waivers and was sent outright to the Triple-A St. Paul Saints. In 16 games for the St. Paul, Ortega recorded a 2.42 ERA with 28 strikeouts and 2 saves in 22 1/3 innings of work. On June 20, the Twins selected his contract to the major league roster. In 10 games for Minnesota, he logged a 4.30 ERA with 14 strikeouts in 14 2/3 innings pitched. On August 24, Ortega was placed on the injured list with a left lumbar strain. He was transferred to the 60–day injured list on August 28, ending his season.

=== Houston Astros ===
On October 25, 2023, Ortega was claimed off waivers by the Houston Astros. On March 21, 2024, it was announced that Ortega would miss three to four months after undergoing surgery to remove loose bodies from his elbow. On June 26, Ortega underwent season–ending surgery to remove a bone spur from the same elbow. On November 4, he was removed from the 40–man roster and sent outright to the Triple–A Sugar Land Space Cowboys, but rejected the assignment and elected free agency.

=== New York Mets ===
On December 8, 2024, Ortega signed a minor league contract with the New York Mets. He made 13 appearances for the Triple-A Syracuse Mets and Single-A St. Lucie Mets in 2025, accumulating an 0–1 record and 3.07 ERA with 16 strikeouts across 14 2/3 innings pitched. Ortega elected free agency following the season on November 6, 2025.

=== Bravos de León ===
On February 3, 2026, Ortega signed with the Bravos de León of the Mexican League. In 13 relief appearances for León, he posted a 2–2 record with a 8.38 ERA, nine strikeouts, and three walks across 9 2/3 innings pitched. On May 13, Ortega was released by the Bravos.

=== Sultanes de Monterrey ===
On May 17, 2026, Ortega signed with the Sultanes de Monterrey of the Mexican League.
