= Jo Adell =

American baseball player (born 1999)

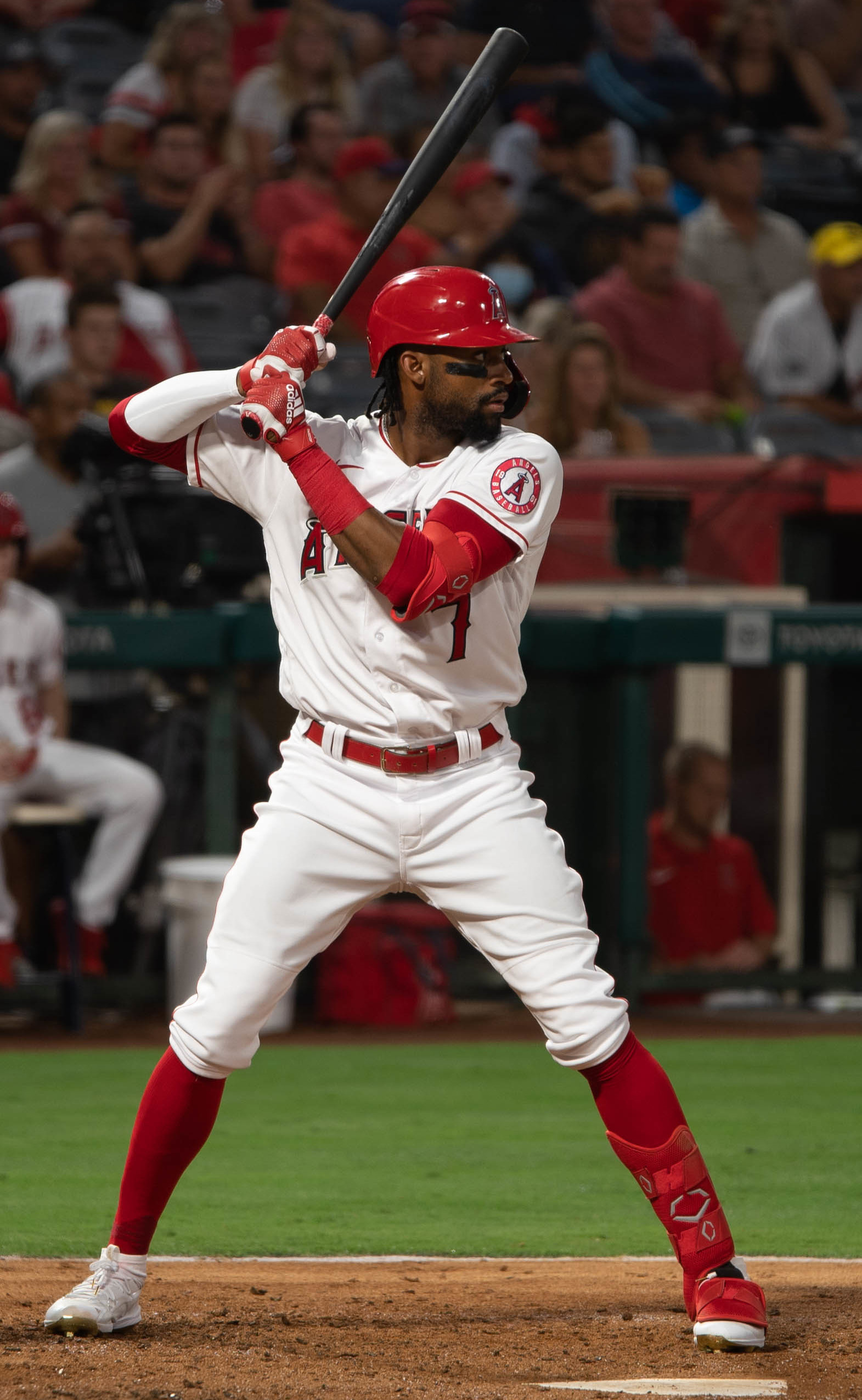
- Adell with the Los Angeles Angels in 2021

Cleveland Guardians – No. 7
- Outfielder
- Born: April 8, 1999 (age 27); Shelby, North Carolina, U.S.
- Bats: Right Throws: Right

MLB debut
- August 4, 2020, for the Los Angeles Angels

MLB statistics (through 2026 season)
- Batting average: .226
- Home runs: 98
- Runs batted in: 320
- Stats at Baseball Reference

Teams
- Los Angeles Angels (2020–2026); Cleveland Guardians (2026–present)

Jordon Scott Adell (born April 8, 1999) is an American professional baseball outfielder for the Cleveland Guardians of Major League Baseball (MLB). He has previously played in MLB for the Los Angeles Angels. Adell made his MLB debut in 2020.

== Amateur career ==
Adell graduated from Ballard High School in Louisville, Kentucky in 2017. After his freshman year in 2014, he committed to the University of Louisville to play college baseball. As a junior in 2016, he hit .449 with 11 home runs and 44 runs batted in (RBIs) and had a 1.55 earned run average (ERA) and 56 strikeouts as a pitcher.

== Professional career ==
=== Los Angeles Angels ===
==== Draft and minors ====
Adell was considered one of the top prospects for the 2017 Major League Baseball (MLB) draft. He was selected by the Los Angeles Angels with the tenth overall selection in the draft. He began his professional career in June with the Arizona League Angels, and after batting .288/.351/.542 with four home runs, 21 RBI, and 10 stolen bases, he was promoted to the Orem Owlz. He spent the rest of the season with Orem, batting .376/.411/.518 with one home run and nine RBI in 18 games for them.

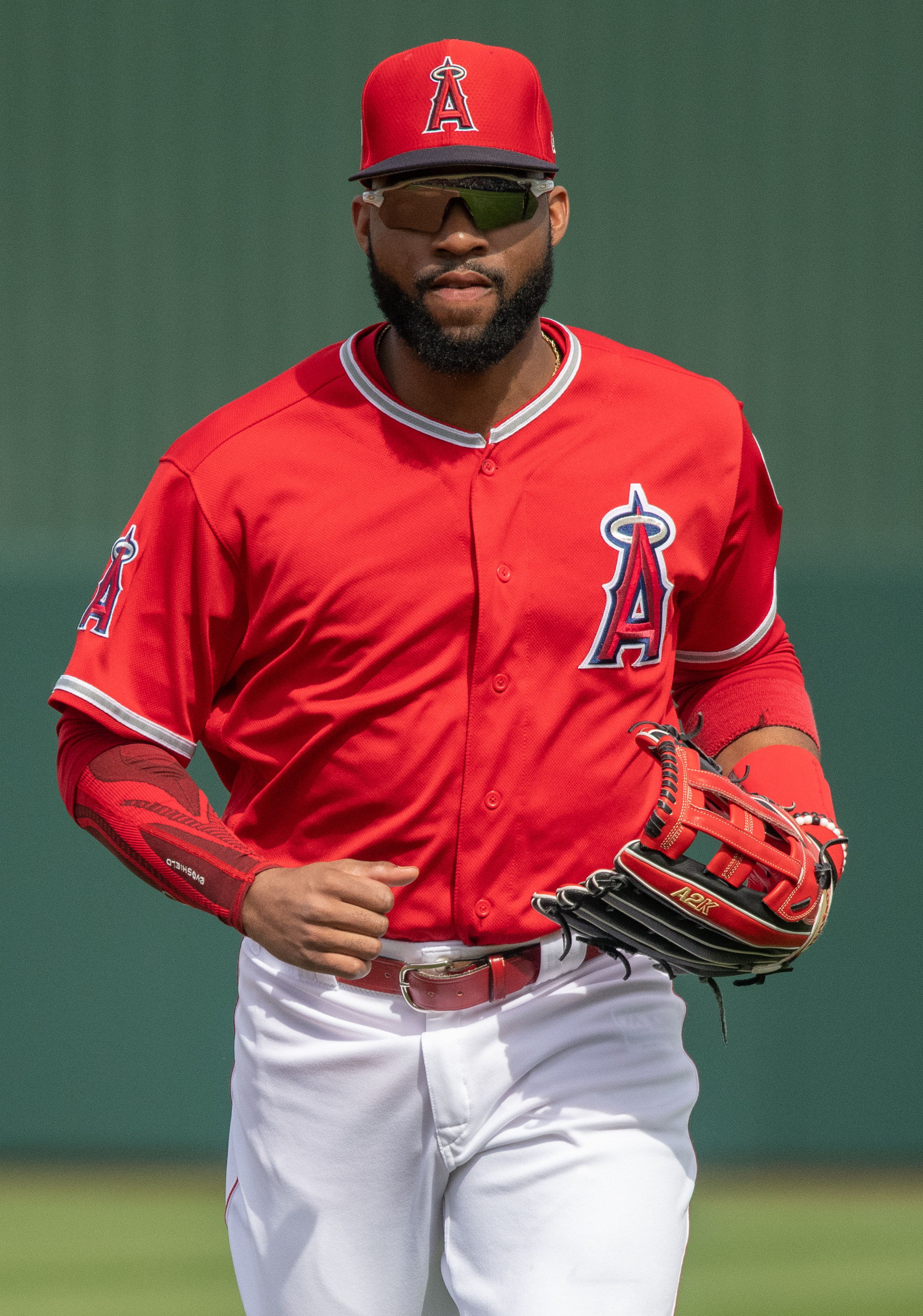
Adell in 2019

In 2018, Adell began the season with the Burlington Bees of the Single–A Midwest League, where he hit .326/.398/.611 with six home runs and 29 RBI in 25 games before being promoted to the Inland Empire 66ers of the High–A California League. He was chosen to represent the Angels in the 2018 All-Star Futures Game. After 57 games with the 66ers, he was promoted to the Mobile BayBears of the Double–A Southern League. In 99 games between the three clubs, he slashed .290/.355/.543 with 20 home runs, 77 RBI, and 15 stolen bases.

Adell was among the Angels' non-roster invitees to 2019 spring training, and joined the team there in February. He began the year on the injured list with Mobile. Through 32 games, he hit .347 and had six home runs to go along with a 1.018 OPS before being named to the 2019 All-Star Futures Game. Playing right field, he went 1-for-2 at the plate with two walks. On August 1, he was promoted to the Salt Lake Bees of Triple–A Pacific Coast League. In 2019, playing for three minor league teams, he batted .289/.359/.475 with 10 home runs and 36 RBI. After the season, he was selected to play in the Arizona Fall League for the Mesa Solar Sox following the season.

On October 10, Adell was selected for the United States national baseball team in the 2019 WBSC Premier 12. In the tournament he batted .394/.429/.697 with 11 hits (tied for the tournament lead), three home runs, and five RBI in 33 at-bats.

==== 2020–2023 ====
On August 4, 2020, the Angels promoted Adell to the major leagues. He made his debut that night against the Seattle Mariners, going 1-for-4. On August 29, he hit his first major league home run against Seattle Mariners pitcher Justus Sheffield. That same night, he hit his second major league home run, against Aaron Fletcher. He finished his rookie season batting .161/.212/.266 with 3 home runs and seven RBIs in 38 games.

Adell began his 2021 season with Salt Lake. He was called back up to the major leagues on August 2. Adell made his season debut the following day, going 3-for-4 with two doubles, three RBIs and a stolen base against the Texas Rangers. On August 17 against the Detroit Tigers, he hit his first career grand slam. Adell finished the season batting .246/.295/.408, hitting four home runs and 26 RBIs in 35 games.

Adell appeared in a career-high 88 games for the Angels in 2022. In 268 at-bats, he slashed .224/.264/.373 with eight home runs, 27 RBIs, and four stolen bases.

Adell was optioned to Triple-A Salt Lake to begin the 2023 season. In a six-game stretch in April, he homered in all six games, setting an Angels franchise record. On June 21, Adell hit a 514-foot (157 m) home run at Smith's Ballpark, the longest home run hit in either the minor or major leagues since Statcast tracking started in 2015. He went 3–for–13 (.231) in five games before being placed on the injured list with a left oblique strain on July 14. Adell was transferred to the 60-day injured list on August 1. He was activated from the injured list on September 18.

Over four seasons from the debut, Adell batted .214/.259/.366 in 178 games in the majors.

==== 2024 ====
Before the 2024 season, Adell was considered as the fourth outfielder on the Angels, following Mike Trout, Taylor Ward and Mickey Moniak. While spring training, he tried to change his approach, working to improve the contact rate. As a result of this change, Adell started the first 24 games, slashing .290/.338/.565 with four home runs, three doubles, a triple and 11 RBIs.

On May 20, Adell, Zach Neto, Logan O'Hoppe and Nolan Schanuel helped the Angels earn a 9–7 win over the Astros at Minute Maid Park, marking the first time that the Angels received four home runs in one game from players 25 years of age or younger. It was also the first time in MLB history a club had home runs from a 25-year-old, a 24-year-old, a 23-year-old and a 22-year-old in the same game. On May 31, he hit a game-tying pinch-hit grand slam against the Seattle Mariners at T-Mobile Park. It marked the seventh pinch-hit gland slam in club history, and the first game-tying gland slam since Hunter Pence did so in 2019.

Adell then went into a three-month slump, with a slash line of .162/.241/.328 over 73 games. To adapt, he decided not to use leg kick in order to cut down on his strikeout rate. After the change, Adell slashed .273/.339/.505 with five home runs, six doubles and 15 RBIs in 29 games, with his strikeout rate declining from 29.1 percent to 25.2 percent.

Adell played in 130 games for the Angels in 2024, slashing .207/.280/.402 with 20 home runs, 62 RBI, and 15 stolen bases. He was placed on the injured list with a left oblique strain on September 7, 2024, and was transferred to the 60-day injured list two days later, ending his season. He also improved his defense that year, tying for first with Mike Yastrzemski among all qualified right fielders with six DRS, per FanGraphs. After the season, Adell was named one of the 2024 AL Gold Glove Award finalists as a right fielder.

==== 2025 ====
On April 10, 2025, Adell became the third player in Angels history to hit two home runs in one inning, doing so in the fifth inning of an 11–1 win over the Tampa Bay Rays. On April 20, he hit a walk-off three-run double in a 5–4 win over the San Francisco Giants, marking his second career walk-off hit. On June 2, the Angels launched three home runs, including his solo home run in the first inning against the Boston Red sox, marking the first time a visiting club hit three home runs in the first inning at Fenway Park. On July 19, Adell hit his 21st home run of the year, marking a career high. On August 19, he hit a 452-feet home run at Angels Stadium, marking his longest home run in his career.

On August 26, Adell hit his 30th home run of the season for the first time in his career. On September 8, he was named AL Player of the Week for the first time, hitting .407 with five home runs, 12 RBI, a double, two walks, six runs scored, a stolen base and a 1.448 OPS across seven games. On September 27, Adell was voted as team MVP after a breakout season where he boasted 37 home runs, 98 RBI, 63 runs, and 18 doubles.

==== 2026 ====
On April 4, 2026, Adell became the first player in MLB history to rob three home runs in one game, when he did so in a 1–0 win over the Seattle Mariners. He first robbed Cal Raleigh's first potential homer of the year in the first inning, before robbing Josh Naylor of a home run in the eighth. In the ninth inning, the third took place when he robbed J. P. Crawford of a home run, leaping into the right field stands in the process. The previous record, as tracked by Sports Info Solutions was two, by Nook Logan in 2005 and Jesús Sánchez in 2025.

Adell appeared in 111 games for the Angels in 2026, batting .239 with 16 home runs and 62 RBI.

=== Cleveland Guardians ===
On August 3, 2026, the Angels traded Adell to the Cleveland Guardians in exchange for Jacob Cozart. He made his Guardians debut on August 4, going 2–for–4 in Cleveland's 6–2 loss to the New York Mets.

== Personal life ==
Growing up, Adell experienced reoccurring seizures due to having epilepsy, which prevented him from ever pursuing football and instead focusing on baseball. He is the son of former college football player Scott Adell and Doctor Nicole W. Adell. He has an older sister named Jessica, who was a star softball player herself, with whom he shares a close bond. When the time came for Jo's freshman year his sister was already nationally known for her elite talent.
