= Mickey Moniak =

American baseball player (born 1998)

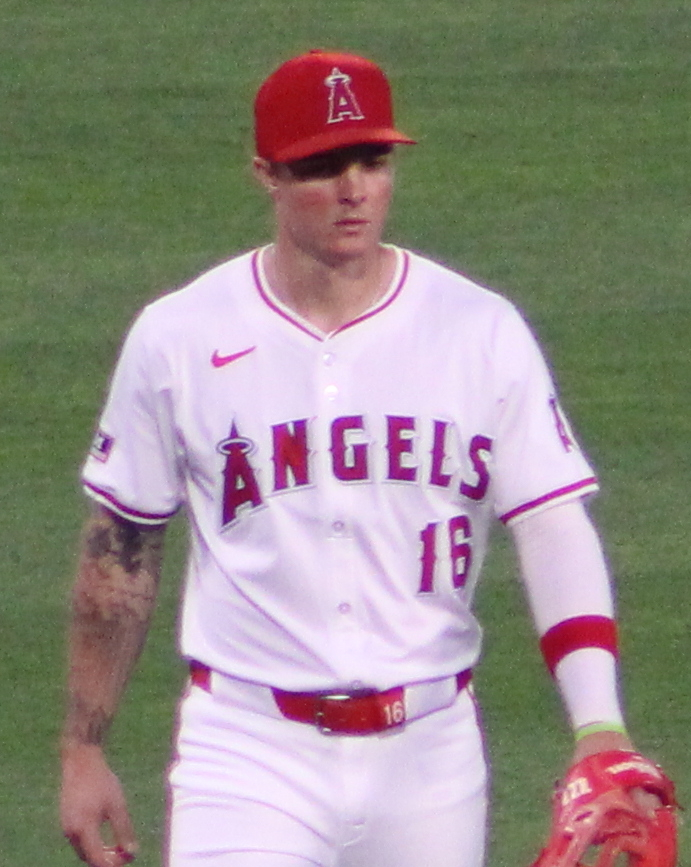
- Moniak with the Los Angeles Angels in 2024

Colorado Rockies – No. 22
- Outfielder
- Born: May 13, 1998 (age 28); Encinitas, California, U.S.
- Bats: Left Throws: Right

MLB debut
- September 16, 2020, for the Philadelphia Phillies

MLB statistics (through 2026 season)
- Batting average: .242
- Home runs: 79
- Runs batted in: 238
- Stats at Baseball Reference

Teams
- Philadelphia Phillies (2020–2022); Los Angeles Angels (2022–2024); Colorado Rockies (2025–present)
Medals
Men's baseball
Representing United States
U-18 Baseball World Cup
Gold medal – first place	2015 Osaka	Team

McKenzie Matthew Moniak (born May 13, 1998) is an American professional baseball outfielder for the Colorado Rockies of Major League Baseball (MLB). He has previously played in MLB for the Philadelphia Phillies and Los Angeles Angels. The Phillies selected Moniak with the first overall pick of the 2016 MLB draft.

== Amateur career ==
Moniak attended La Costa Canyon High School in Carlsbad, California, and played center field for the baseball team. As a sophomore, he batted .461 with two home runs, and 27 runs batted in (RBI). As a junior, in 2015, Moniak hit .426 with a 1.062 on-base plus slugging (OPS). That August, he played in the Perfect Game All-American Classic at Petco Park.

In 2016, as a senior, Moniak batted .476 with a .961 slugging percentage and 40 runs, 12 triples (a San Diego Section record), seven home runs, and 46 RBI, in 29 games. He was named Baseball America High School Player of the Year, Gatorade California Baseball Player of the Year, and San Diego Section Player of the Year. Moniak committed to attend the University of California, Los Angeles (UCLA) to play college baseball for the UCLA Bruins.

== Professional career ==
=== Draft and minor leagues (2016–2019) ===
The Philadelphia Phillies selected Moniak with the first overall pick of the 2016 MLB draft. On June 20, 2016, he signed with the Phillies after agreeing to a $6.1 million signing bonus.

Moniak made his professional debut with the Rookie-level Gulf Coast League Phillies in 2016. He spent all of his first professional season there, batting .284/.340/.409 with 27 runs (10th in the Gulf Coast League), 11 doubles (tied for 9th), four triples (tied for 8th), one home run, 28 RBI (9th), and 10 stolen bases (9th), in 176 at bats. Baseball America ranked Moniak the Number 17 prospect in baseball, and MLB.com ranked him Number 19.

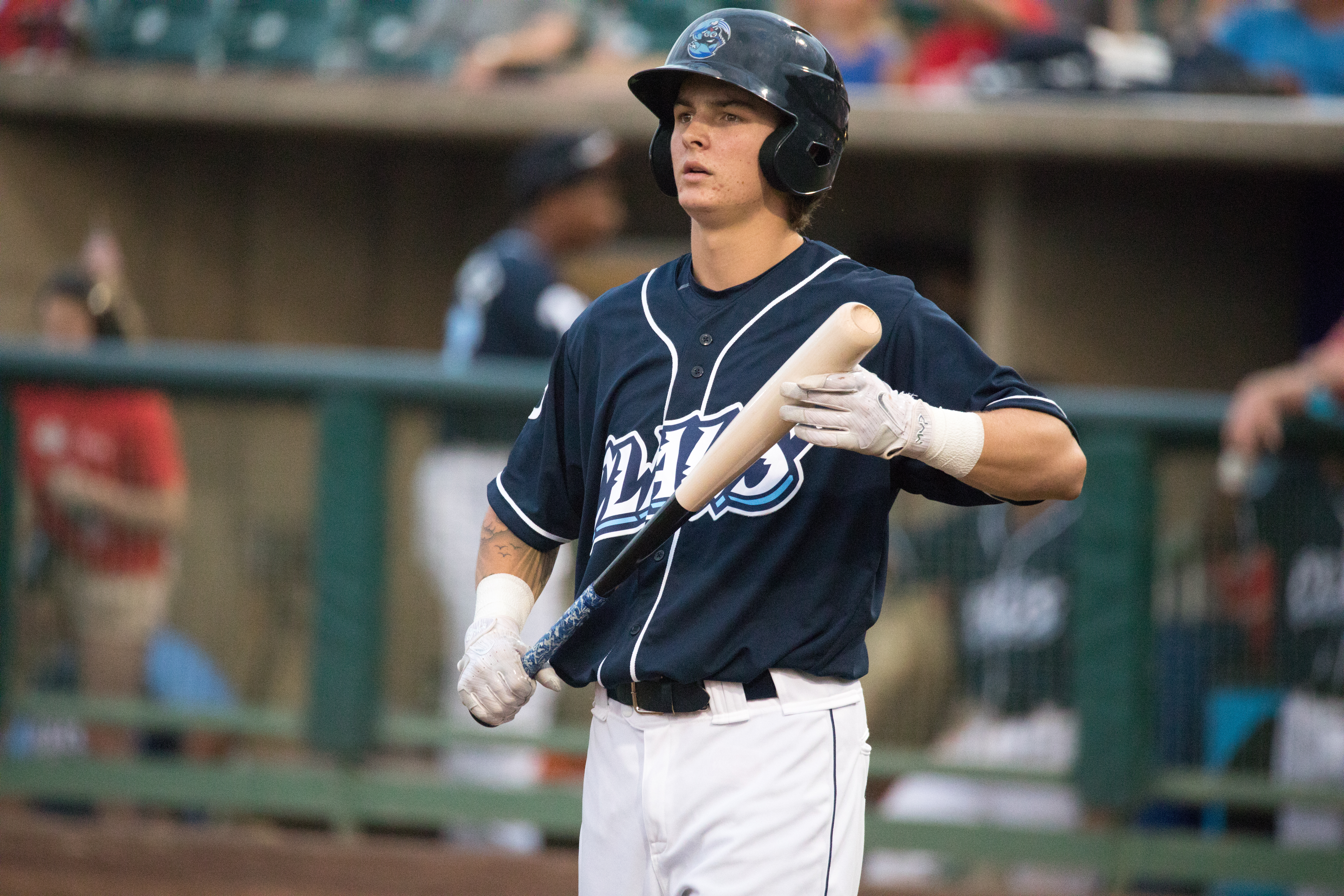
Moniak in 2017

Moniak spent 2017 with the Class A Lakewood BlueClaws, with whom he batted .236/.284/.341 with six triples (tied for 5th in the South Atlantic League), five home runs, 44 RBI, 11 stolen bases, and seven sacrifice flies (tied for 2nd) in 466 at bats in 123 games. Baseball America named him the best defensive player of his draft class, the second-best pure hitter (behind Nick Senzel), the second-best high school player (behind Bo Bichette), and the high school player closest to making his major league debut. Moniak spent the 2018 season with the Class A-Advanced Clearwater Threshers. He hit .270/.304/.383 with 28 doubles (second in the Florida State League), five home runs, 55 RBI, six stolen bases, and seven sacrifice flies (tied for 5th) in 433 at bats in 114 games.

In 2019, Moniak received an invitation to Phillies Major League spring training camp. He played the 2019 season with the Reading Fightin Phils of the Class AA Eastern League, batting .252/.303/.439 with 63 runs (9th in the league), 28 doubles (6th), 13 triples (leading the league), 11 home runs, 67 RBI (tied for 4th), 111 strikeouts (10th), and 15 stolen bases in 18 attempts in 465 at bats. Moniak was selected to play in the Eastern League All-Star Game midway through the season. He was chosen to play in the Arizona Fall League for the Scottsdale Scorpions following the season.

=== Philadelphia Phillies (2020–2022) ===
On September 16, 2020, Moniak was added to the Phillies' 40-man roster, and was promoted to the major leagues for the first time. That night, he made his MLB debut against the New York Mets as a ninth-inning pinch runner for Alec Bohm, at Citizens Bank Park. On September 18, 2020, Moniak roped a line drive into right field, a single, for his first big league hit, in the second game of a doubleheader against the Toronto Blue Jays.

On April 21, 2021, Moniak hit his first major league home run in the 2nd inning against Anthony DeSclafani of the San Francisco Giants.

After a strong spring training in 2022, it was announced that Moniak had made the Phillies' Opening Day roster. However, Moniak suffered a right hand fracture in the final exhibition game against the Tampa Bay Rays on a Ryan Yarbrough hit-by-pitch. He was instead placed on the injured list to begin the season, and was given a recovery timetable of six weeks.

=== Los Angeles Angels (2022–2024) ===
On August 2, 2022, Moniak was traded alongside prospect Jadiel Sanchez to the Los Angeles Angels for starting pitcher Noah Syndergaard. He made his Angels debut the next day, going 0-for-2 against the Oakland Athletics. In his first week with the Angels, Moniak went 4-for-14 (.286) with a pair of home runs in five games. On August 6, during a game against the Seattle Mariners, Moniak injured his left middle finger while attempting to bunt. The following day, the injury was diagnosed as a fracture; however, he was not expected to miss the remainder of the season. He returned from the injury on September 9 and was platooned with Jo Adell. On September 28, Moniak was hit on the hand by a pitch in a game against the Athletics. Although X-rays returned negative, the Angels placed him on the injured list, sidelining him for the final seven games of the season. Between the Phillies and the Angels, Moniak finished the 2022 season batting .170 with three home runs and eight RBIs in 37 games.

Moniak was optioned to the Triple-A Salt Lake Bees to begin the 2023 season. He was recalled from Salt Lake on May 12, 2023, hitting .280 with 14 home runs and 45 RBIs in 85 games. In 2024, Moniak played in 124 games for the Angels, batting .219/.266/.380 with 14 home runs and 49 RBI. On March 25, 2025, he was released by the team.

=== Colorado Rockies ===
On March 26, 2025, Moniak signed a one-year, $1.25 million contract with the Colorado Rockies. He played in 135 games for the Rockies during the 2025 season and batted .270 with 24 home runs, 68 RBI, and 20 doubles.

On January 8, 2026, the Rockies and Moniak avoided arbitration by agreeing to a one-year, $4 million contract. On August 4, 2026, Moniak signed a two-year, $16.25 million contract extension with the Rockies.

== Personal life ==
Mickey Moniak's grandfather, Bill Moniak, played six years in the Boston Red Sox organization.
