= Tucker Davidson =

American baseball player (born 1996)

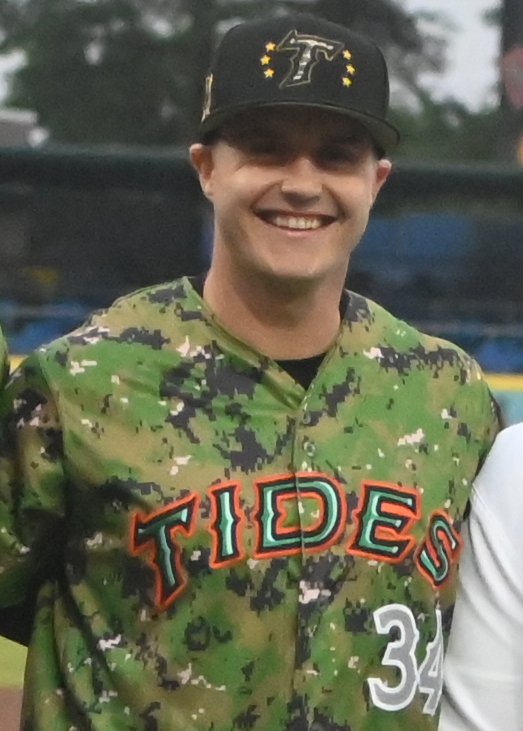
- Davidson with the Norfolk Tides in 2024

Free agent
- Pitcher
- Born: March 25, 1996 (age 30); Amarillo, Texas, U.S.
- Bats: Left Throws: Left

Professional debut
- MLB: September 26, 2020, for the Atlanta Braves
- KBO: March 25, 2025, for the Lotte Giants

MLB statistics (through 2024 season)
- Win–loss record: 4–10
- Earned run average: 5.76
- Strikeouts: 100

KBO statistics (through 2025 season)
- Win–loss record: 10–5
- Earned run average: 3.65
- Strikeouts: 119
- Stats at Baseball Reference

Teams
- Atlanta Braves (2020–2022); Los Angeles Angels (2022–2023); Kansas City Royals (2023); Baltimore Orioles (2024); Lotte Giants (2025)

Career highlights and awards
- World Series champion (2021)

Joseph Tucker Davidson (born March 25, 1996) is an American professional baseball pitcher who is a free agent. He has previously played in Major League Baseball (MLB) for the Atlanta Braves, Los Angeles Angels, Kansas City Royals, and Baltimore Orioles, and in the KBO League for the Lotte Giants. Davidson played college baseball at Midland College. He was drafted by the Braves in the 19th round of the 2016 MLB draft, and made his MLB debut with them in 2020.

== Amateur career ==
Davidson attended Tascosa High School ('14) in Amarillo, Texas. There he played baseball (as a starting pitcher) and football (as a quarterback).

Passed over in the baseball draft, he played college baseball at Midland College in Texas. For Midland in his sophomore year in 2016, Davidson was 6–2 with a 2.27 ERA and 75 strikeouts in 71 1/3 innings. He was named All-Western Junior College Athletic Conference first team.

== Professional career ==
=== Atlanta Braves ===
==== Minor leagues ====
Davidson was drafted by the Atlanta Braves in the 19th round of the 2016 Major League Baseball draft. Davidson ended his collegiate baseball career to sign with the Braves organization, instead of joining the NC State Wolfpack baseball team as he had planned.

Davidson made his professional debut with the Rookie-level Gulf Coast League Braves, going 0–3 with a 1.52 ERA and 32 strikeouts in 29 2/3 innings in 11 games (one start). He spent 2017 with the Single–A Rome Braves, pitching to a 5–4 record with two saves and a 2.60 ERA in 103 2/3 innings over 31 games (12 starts).

He then played 2018 with the Florida Fire Frogs of the High–A Florida State League, compiling a 7–10 record and 4.18 ERA in 14 starts. Davidson started 2019 with the Double–A Mississippi Braves and was named a Southern League All-Star, before being promoted to the Gwinnett Stripers of the Triple-A East with whom he had four starts. Over 25 starts between both clubs, he went 8–7 with a 2.15 ERA in 25 starts, striking out 134 over 129 2/3 innings.

==== Major leagues ====
On November 19, 2019, the Braves added Davidson to their 40-man roster to protect him from the Rule 5 draft. Before the 2020 Minor League Baseball season was canceled as a result of the COVID-19 pandemic, Davidson was scheduled to begin the year at Gwinnett. Instead, he was named to the Atlanta Braves' 60-member player pool for the shortened 2020 Major League Baseball season. Davidson was promoted to the major leagues for the first time from the team's alternate site on September 25, 2020. Davidson faced the Boston Red Sox the next day and took the loss, yielding two earned runs and seven total, in 1 2/3 innings pitched, in his only game of the season.

In 2021, in four starts for the Braves, Davidson was 0–0 with a 3.60 ERA in 20 innings. For Gwinnett, he was 2–2 in four starts with a 1.17 ERA in 23 innings in which he struck out 28 batters, giving up only 11 hits and 5 walks. On June 24, 2021, Davidson was placed on the 60-day injured list with left forearm inflammation.

On October 27, 2021, Davidson was added to the Braves' roster for the World Series against the Houston Astros after Charlie Morton suffered a fractured fibula. On October 31, 2021, he was announced as the starter for Game 5. Davidson pitched two innings, giving up four runs (two earned) and did not factor into the decision of the Braves’ eventual 9–5 loss. The team would go on to win the World Series as they won the game with a score of 7–0 in Houston.

On April 7, 2022, it was announced that Davidson had made the Braves Opening Day roster for the first time in his career. He pitched the first five innings of a shutout against the Milwaukee Brewers on May 17 for his first career victory.

=== Los Angeles Angels ===
On August 2, 2022, Davidson and Jesse Chavez were traded from the Atlanta Braves to the Los Angeles Angels for Raisel Iglesias.

On April 2, 2023, Davidson earned his first career save, tossing four scoreless innings of relief against the Oakland Athletics. In 18 games, he struggled to a 6.54 ERA with 31 strikeouts in 31 2/3 innings pitched. On July 27, Davidson was designated for assignment.

=== Kansas City Royals ===
On August 1, 2023, the Kansas City Royals acquired Davidson from the Angels for cash considerations. In 20 games, Davidson posted a 5.03 ERA with 15 strikeouts in 19 2/3 innings pitched.

=== Baltimore Orioles ===
On October 25, 2023, Davidson was claimed off waivers by the Baltimore Orioles. On November 14, Davidson was removed from the 40–man roster and sent outright to the Triple-A Norfolk Tides. In 32 games (17 starts) for Norfolk in 2024, he compiled a 5–11 record and 3.89 ERA with 104 strikeouts across 115 2/3 innings pitched. On September 28, 2024, the Orioles selected Davidson's contract. adding him to their active roster. That day, he was the winning pitcher in his debut with the club after allowing four hits over 4 2/3 shutout innings out of the bullpen in a 9–2 away victory over the Minnesota Twins. Davidson was designated for assignment by the Orioles the next day. He cleared waivers and elected free agency on October 7.

=== Lotte Giants ===
On December 12, 2024, Davidson signed with the Lotte Giants of the KBO League for ₩850,000,000 and ₩100,000,000 in incentives. He faced the SSG Landers in his KBO League debut on March 25, 2025. In 21 appearances for Lotte, Davidson compiled a 9-5 record and 3.76 ERA with 115 strikeouts across 117 1/3 innings pitched. On August 6, Davidson was released by the Giants following the signing of Vince Velasquez.

=== Milwaukee Brewers ===
On August 20, 2025, Davidson signed a minor league contract with the Milwaukee Brewers. He made six starts for the Triple-A Nashville Sounds, posting a 2-0 record and 4.68 ERA with 25 strikeouts over 25 innings of work. Davidson was released by the Brewers organization on October 12.

=== Philadelphia Phillies ===
On January 6, 2026, Davidson signed a minor league contract with the Philadelphia Phillies. In 32 games (15 starts) with Triple-A Lehigh Valley IronPigs he threw 98.2 innings going 6-6 with a 5.66 ERA and 84 strikeouts. He elected free agency on November 2.
