= Andrew Velazquez =

American baseball player (born 1994)

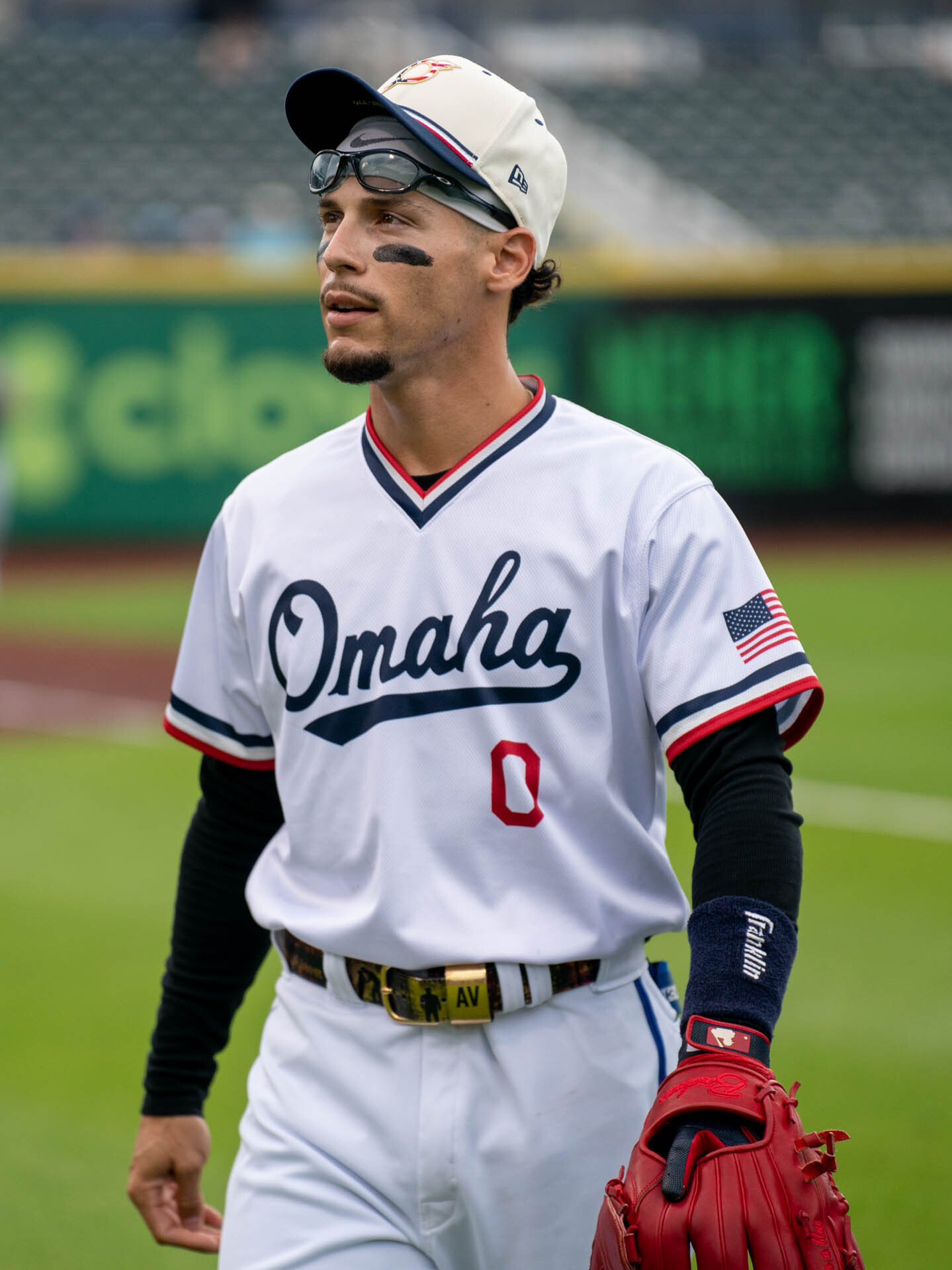
- Velazquez with the Omaha Storm Chasers in 2026

Free agent
- Infielder
- Born: July 14, 1994 (age 32); The Bronx, New York, U.S.
- Bats: Switch Throws: Right

MLB debut
- September 2, 2018, for the Tampa Bay Rays

MLB statistics (through 2026 season)
- Batting average: .186
- Home runs: 12
- Runs batted in: 40
- Stats at Baseball Reference

Teams
- Tampa Bay Rays (2018–2019); Cleveland Indians (2019); Baltimore Orioles (2020); New York Yankees (2021); Los Angeles Angels (2022–2023); Kansas City Royals (2026)

Andrew Velazquez (born July 14, 1994), nicknamed "Squid", is an American professional baseball infielder who is a free agent. He has previously played in Major League Baseball (MLB) for the Tampa Bay Rays, Cleveland Indians, Baltimore Orioles, New York Yankees, Los Angeles Angels, and Kansas City Royals.

== Early life and career ==
Velazquez is from Morris Park in the Bronx, a borough of New York City. His father, Kenneth, worked in the New York City Police Department as a detective and undercover narcotics officer for 20 years. His mother, Margaret, was a school teacher.

Velazquez attended Fordham Preparatory School, where he played for the school's baseball team. He played as a center fielder until his senior year, when he became the team's starting shortstop. In his senior year, the New York Post named Velazquez their All-Bronx Baseball Player of the Year. Velazquez also competed on the Prep's track and field team, as a sprinter and high jumper. He received an athletic scholarship to attend Virginia Polytechnic Institute and State University (Virginia Tech) to play college baseball for the Virginia Tech Hokies.

== Professional career ==
=== Arizona Diamondbacks ===
The Arizona Diamondbacks selected him in the seventh round, with the 243rd overall selection, of the 2012 Major League Baseball draft. He signed with the Diamondbacks, receiving a $200,000 signing bonus, bypassing his commitment to Virginia Tech. That year, he made his professional debut with the Rookie-level Arizona League Diamondbacks of the Arizona League and the Missoula Osprey of the Pioneer League.

In 2013, Velazquez was assigned to the South Bend Silver Hawks of the Single-A Midwest League. For the season, he had a .260 batting average, but had almost three times as many strikeouts as walks. Returning to South Bend in 2014, Velazquez set a Minor League Baseball record with his 72nd consecutive game reaching base, breaking the record of 71 set by Kevin Millar in 1997 and tied by Kevin Youkilis in 2003. His streak, which lasted from April 22 to July 16, ended at 74 consecutive games. After the season, Velazquez was named the Midwest League Prospect of the Year. While playing in the Diamondbacks system, he was given the nickname "Squid".

=== Tampa Bay Rays ===
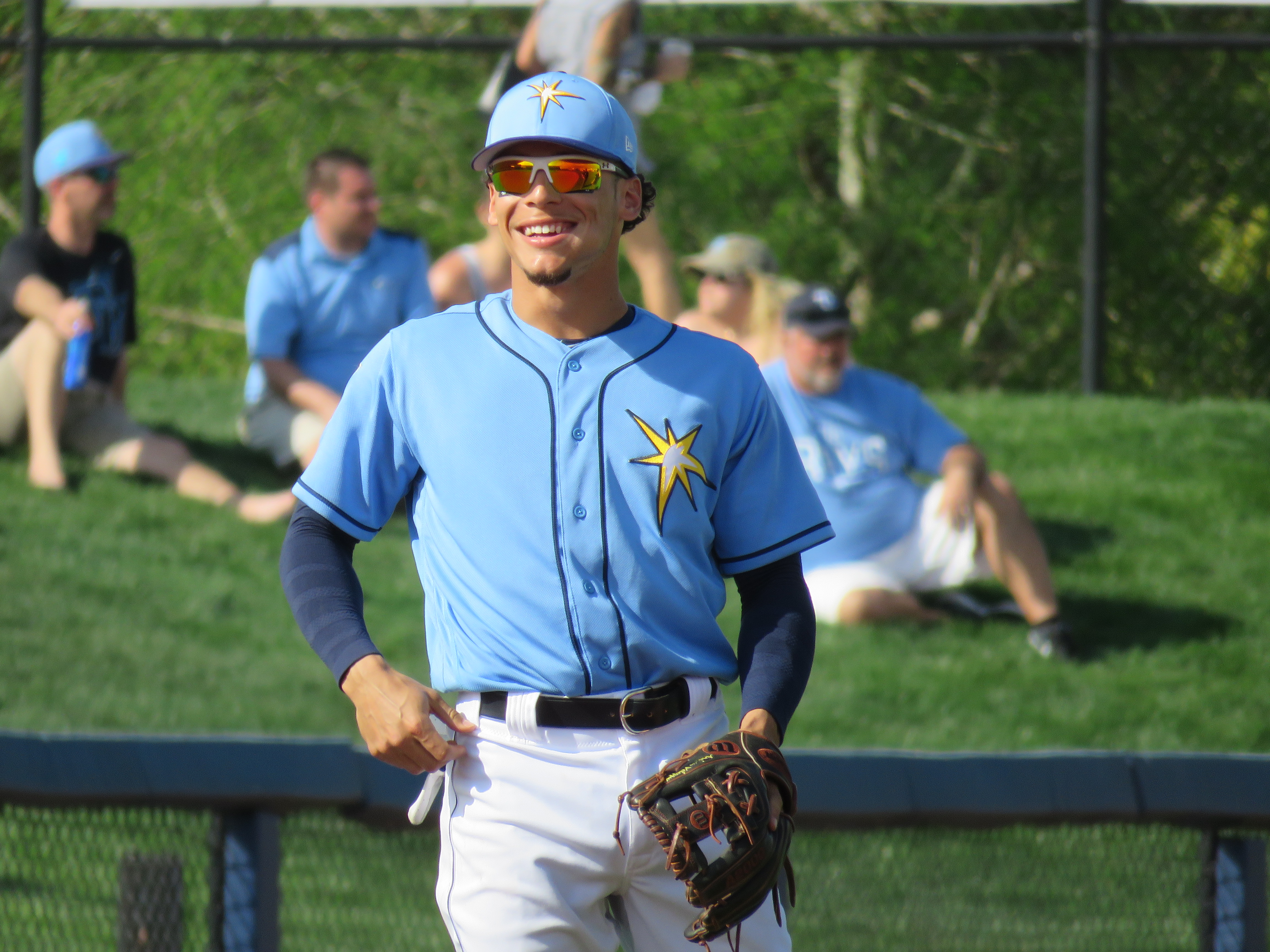
Velazquez with the Tampa Bay Rays in 2018

On November 14, 2014, the Diamondbacks traded Velazquez and Justin Williams to the Tampa Bay Rays in exchange for Jeremy Hellickson. He began the 2015 season with the Charlotte Stone Crabs of the High-A Florida State League, but underwent surgery in May to repair a broken hamate bone. He finished the season hitting .290/.343/.360 in 47 games. He returned to Charlotte in 2016, where he finished an injury shortened season hitting .262/.313/.308 in 75 games. Velazquez played for the Montgomery Biscuits of the Double-A Southern League in 2017 and Montgomery and the Durham Bulls of the Triple-A International League in 2018.

On September 2, 2018, the Rays promoted Velazquez to the major leagues for the first time. He recorded three hits in ten at-bats playing off the bench. Despite only playing 34 2/3 innings and making only one start, Velazquez played at least one inning at six positions (second base, shortstop, third base, left field, center field, and right field).

=== Cleveland Indians ===
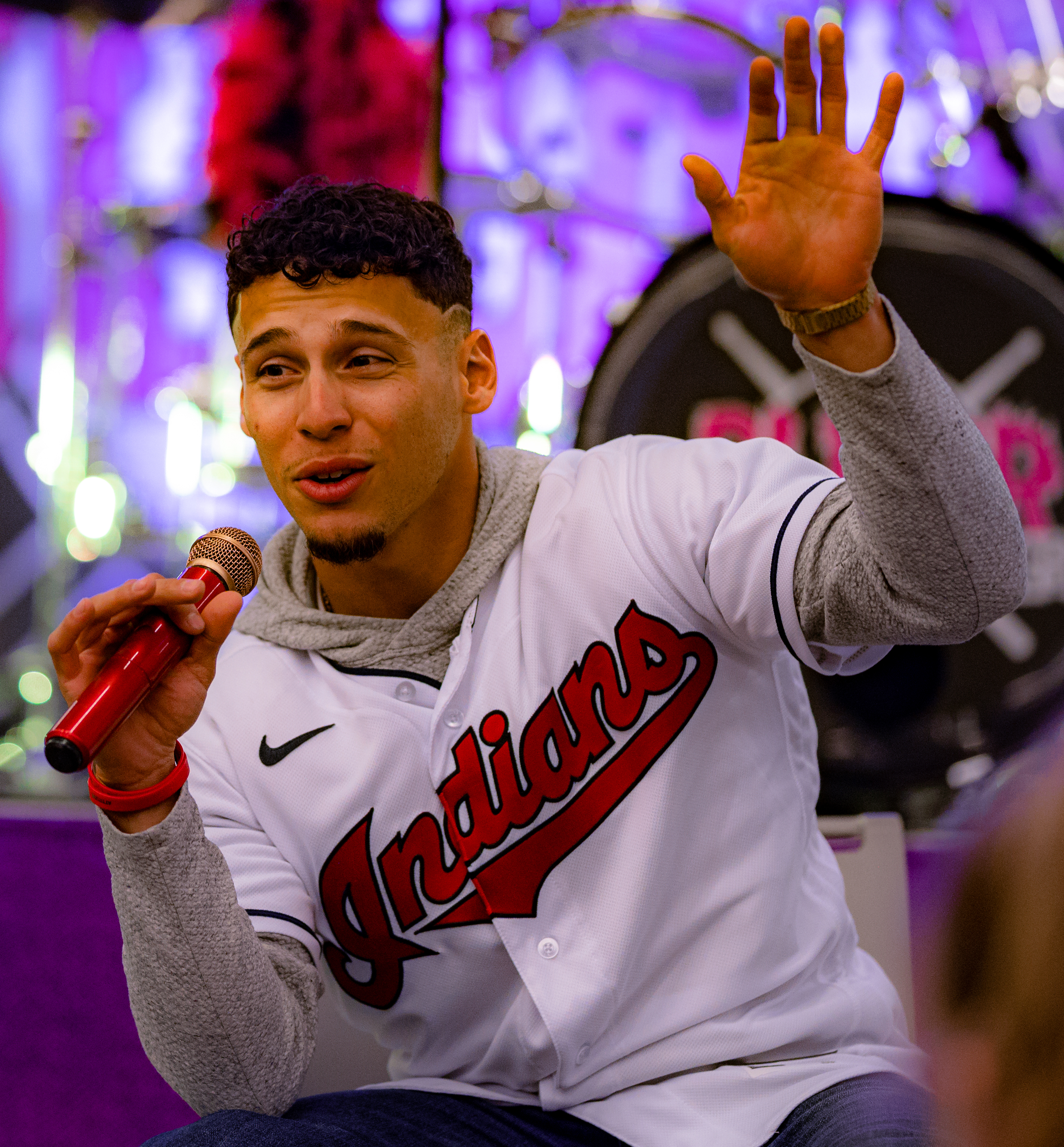
Velazquez with the Cleveland Indians in 2020

On July 3, 2019, the Rays traded Velazquez to the Cleveland Indians in exchange for international bonus pool allotments. In a corresponding move the Indians designated Chih-Wei Hu for assignment. Cleveland assigned Velazquez to the Columbus Clippers of the International League, and promoted him to the major leagues on September 17. He appeared in five games for Cleveland, registering one hit, a double, in 11 at bats.

Velazquez was designated for assignment on February 14, 2020, when they signed Domingo Santana.

=== Baltimore Orioles ===
Velazquez was claimed off waivers by the Baltimore Orioles on February 19, 2020. In 2020 for the Orioles, Velazquez slashed .159/.274/.206 with no home runs and three RBI. On October 29, Velazquez was outrighted off of the 40-man roster. He became a free agent on November 2.

=== New York Yankees ===
On December 16, 2020, Velazquez signed a minor league contract with the New York Yankees organization. On July 16, 2021, Velazquez was released by the Yankees organization, but re-signed with the team the next day on a new minor league deal. On August 9, the Yankees promoted Velazquez to the major leagues. Playing for the Yankees was a dream come true for Velazquez. He had grown up idolizing Derek Jeter. On August 10, Velazquez scored his first Yankees run on a wild pitch.

In seven at bats in a series against the Boston Red Sox, Velazquez tallied three run-scoring hits with 4 RBI, (one run of his own, and a stolen base). After closing out the final game with a diving catch at shortstop and a difficult throw to first base from deep in the hole, his teammates awarded him the well-deserved "game belt" in recognition of his contributions to the series sweep that saw the team move into first place of the Wild Card standings; two games ahead of the rival Red Sox.

On August 21, Velazquez hit his first career home run during a home game against the Minnesota Twins at Yankee Stadium off pitcher Ralph Garza.

On September 11, following the team’s victory over the New York Mets, Velazquez was demoted to the Yankees' Triple-A affiliate, the Scranton/Wilkes-Barre RailRiders. He was recalled to the Yankees prior to the penultimate game of the regular season on October 2.

=== Los Angeles Angels ===
On November 5, 2021, Velazquez was claimed off waivers by the Los Angeles Angels. He opened the 2022 season with the Salt Lake Bees of the Triple-A Pacific Coast League and was promoted to the major leagues on April 12 to be the starting shortstop after David Fletcher was injured. On September 13, 2022, during a game against the Cleveland Guardians, Velazquez suffered a right meniscus tear, ending his season. In 125 games, Velazquez batted .196/.236/.304 with nine home runs and 28 RBI.

On March 1, 2023, Velazquez gave up switch hitting and focused primarily on being a right-handed hitter. He has since gone back to being a switch hitter. Velazquez was optioned to Triple-A Salt Lake to begin the 2023 season. In 54 games for the Angels, he hit .173/.264/.284 with 2 home runs, 3 RBI, and 13 stolen bases.

=== Atlanta Braves ===
On September 5, 2023, Velazquez was claimed off waivers by the Atlanta Braves. In 14 games for the Triple–A Gwinnett Stripers, he hit .217/.266/.250 with no home runs and four RBI. Following the season on November 1, Velazquez was removed from the 40–man roster and sent outright to Triple–A Gwinnett. However, Velazquez rejected the assignment and elected free agency.

On November 24, 2023, Velazquez re-signed with the Braves on a minor league contract. He played in 118 games for Gwinnett in 2024, slashing .242/.298/.394 with 16 home runs, 48 RBI, and 33 stolen bases. Velazquez elected free agency following the season on November 4, 2024.

=== New York Yankees (second stint) ===
On January 3, 2025, Velazquez signed a minor league contract with the New York Yankees. He was released on August 3, but re-signed with the organization on a new minor league contract on August 14. In 106 appearances for the Triple-A Scranton/Wilkes-Barre RailRiders, Velazquez batted .242/.304/.345 with five home runs, 41 RBI, and 25 stolen bases. He elected free agency following the season on November 6.

=== Arizona Diamondbacks (second stint) ===
On December 8, 2025, Velazquez signed a minor league contract with the Texas Rangers. He was released by the Rangers prior to the start of the regular season on March 26, 2026.

On April 16, 2026, Velazquez signed a minor league contract with the Arizona Diamondbacks. In 40 appearances for the Triple-A Reno Aces, he batted .274/.335/.390 with three home runs, 21 RBI, and five stolen bases. Velazquez was released by the Diamondbacks organization on June 15.

=== Kansas City Royals ===
On June 24, 2026, Velazquez signed a minor league contract with the Kansas City Royals. He made 18 appearances for the Triple-A Omaha Storm Chasers, batting .259/.328/.315 with nine RBI and eight stolen bases. On July 22, the Royals promoted Velazquez to their active roster following an injury to Bobby Witt Jr. In six appearances for Kansas City, he went 1–for–15 (.067) with one stolen base. Velazquez was designated for assignment by the Royals on August 3. He elected free agency on August 7.
