= John Carpino =

American baseball executive

Los Angeles Angels
- Baseball Executive
- Born: Chicago, Illinois, U.S.

Teams
- Los Angeles Angels (2009–2026) President

John Carpino is an American baseball executive. He was president of the Los Angeles Angels of Major League Baseball. He was named the eighth President in Angels history on Nov. 14, 2009 following six seasons as the Club's Senior Vice President of Sales and Marketing. In addition to his role with the Team, Carpino oversees AM830 Radio; the home of Angels Baseball, Anaheim Ducks Hockey, and Notre Dame Football in Southern California.

Carpino's professional career began in 1982 in the billboard industry, including stints in Tucson, AZ; Chicago, IL; Phoenix, AZ and Los Angeles, CA. In 1985, he joined current Angels owner Arte Moreno at Outdoor Systems, a billboard company, which would later become Viacom Outdoor in 2000 and CBS Outdoor in 2005 and spent 18 years in the Phoenix and Los Angeles markets.

Carpino currently serves on the Children's Hospital of Orange County (CHOC) Children's Foundation Board of Directors and served for three years on the Executive Board for the Orange County United Way. Additionally, Carpino was inducted into the National Italian American Sports Hall of Fame in 2017.

Carpino was born in Chicago, Illinois, and attended the University of Arizona.
