= Andrew Wantz =

American baseball player (born 1995)

Free agent
- Pitcher
- Born: October 13, 1995 (age 31); Holly Springs, North Carolina, U.S.
- Bats: Right Throws: Right

MLB debut
- July 4, 2021, for the Los Angeles Angels

MLB statistics (through 2026 season)
- Win–loss record: 5–1
- Earned run average: 4.20
- Strikeouts: 127
- Stats at Baseball Reference

Teams
- Los Angeles Angels (2021–2024); Tampa Bay Rays (2026); Chicago Cubs (2026)

Andrew Hunter Wantz (born October 13, 1995) is an American professional baseball pitcher who is a free agent. He has previously played in Major League Baseball (MLB) for the Los Angeles Angels, Tampa Bay Rays, and Chicago Cubs.

== Amateur career ==
Wantz attended and played baseball at Holly Springs High School in Holly Springs, North Carolina. He then played college baseball for the University of North Carolina at Greensboro. In 2016, he played collegiate summer baseball with the Bourne Braves of the Cape Cod Baseball League where he was named a league all-star. Wantz was selected by the Los Angeles Angels in the seventh round of the 2018 MLB draft.

== Professional career ==
=== Los Angeles Angels ===
Wantz made his professional debut with the rookie-level Orem Owlz. He also played for the Single-A Burlington Bees, pitching to a cumulative 1–2 record and 2.74 ERA in 18 games. In 2019, Wantz split the season the High-A Inland Empire 66ers and the Double-A Mobile BayBears, posting a 5–9 record and 5.34 ERA with 112 strikeouts in 96 innings of work.

Wantz did not play in a game in 2020 due to the cancellation of the minor league season because of the COVID-19 pandemic. He was assigned to the Triple-A Salt Lake Bees to begin the 2021 season, where he recorded a 2.10 ERA in 8 appearances.

On July 3, 2021, Wantz was selected to the 40-man roster and promoted to the major leagues for the first time. He made his MLB debut the following day, pitching 1 1/3 innings of relief against the Baltimore Orioles.

On April 19, 2022, the Angels recalled Wantz from Triple-A Salt Lake and added him to the active roster. Wantz made his first major league starting appearance on June 27, at the last minute as an opener, but was ejected for the first time in his career after one pitch in the second inning (and twelve pitches total), which hit Seattle Mariners outfielder Jesse Winker, triggering a bench-clearing brawl which resulted in six players and both team managers being ejected, including Wantz and Winker. Wantz threw a pitch behind the head of the second batter of the game, Julio Rodríguez, in the first inning. The day after, Wantz was suspended three games by Major League Baseball, with his manager Phil Nevin receiving a ten-game suspension for ordering a beanball despite both teams being warned not to. He ultimately pitched in 42 contests for the Angels in 2022, logging a 3.22 ERA with 52 strikeouts.

In 2023, Wantz made 27 appearances for Los Angeles, registering a 3.89 ERA with 33 strikeouts across 39 1/3 innings of work. He was optioned to Triple–A Salt Lake to begin the 2024 season. Wantz made only one appearances for the Angels before he was placed on the injured list with right elbow inflammation on July 2. He was transferred to the 60–day injured list three days later. Wantz was removed from the 40–man roster and sent outright to Triple–A Salt Lake on October 24. He elected free agency following the season on November 4.

=== Tampa Bay Rays ===
On January 2, 2025, Wantz signed a two-year minor league contract with the Tampa Bay Rays. He made 12 total appearances during the year, posting a combined 1-0 record and 0.69 ERA with 15 strikeouts and one save across 13 innings pitched for the High-A Bowling Green Hot Rods and Triple-A Durham Bulls.

Wantz was assigned to Triple-A Durham to begin the 2026 season, where he logged a 2-0 record and 7.04 ERA with 23 strikeouts over his first 18 appearances. On May 29, 2026, the Rays selected Wantz's contract, adding him to their active roster. He made one appearances for the Rays, allowing five runs in 1 2/3 innings pitched against the Los Angeles Angels. Wantz was designated for assignment by Tampa Bay on May 31. He elected free agency after clearing waivers on June 2.

=== Chicago Cubs ===
On June 6, 2026, Wantz signed a minor league contract with the Chicago Cubs. He made seven appearances (including three starts) for the Triple-A Iowa Cubs, logging a 2–1 record and 4.32 ERA with 26 strikeouts over 25 innings of work. On July 27, the Cubs selected Wantz's contract, adding him to their active roster. He made his Cubs debut the following day, allowing one run on three hits across two innings of relief. Wantz was designated for assignment by Chicago on July 29. On August 1, he cleared waivers and elected free agency. On August 7, Wantz re–signed with the Cubs on a minor league contract. He elected free agency on November 2.
