= Los Angeles Angels all-time roster =

List of baseball players

The following is a list of players, both past and current, who appeared at least in one game for the Los Angeles Angels American League franchise (1961–1965; 2016–present), also known previously as the California Angels (1965–1996), Anaheim Angels (1997–2004) and Los Angeles Angels of Anaheim (2005–2015).

Players in Bold are members of the National Baseball Hall of Fame.

Players in Italics have had their numbers retired by the team.

== A ==
- Don Aase
- Jim Abbott
- Kyle Abbott
- Shawn Abner
- Bobby Abreu
- A.J. Achter
- Jordyn Adams
- Ricky Adams
- Joe Adcock
- Jo Adell
- Nick Adenhart
- Ehire Adrianza
- Ryan Aguilar
- Willie Aikens
- Al Albuquerque
- Samuel Aldegheri
- Mike Aldrete
- Cory Aldridge
- Edgardo Alfonzo
- Luis Alicea
- Andy Allanson
- Cody Allen
- Lloyd Allen
- Bob Allietta
- Sandy Alomar Sr.
- José Álvarez
- Juan Alvarez
- Orlando Álvarez
- Alexi Amarista
- Rubén Amaro
- Rubén Amaro Jr.
- Alfredo Amézaga
- Brian Anderson
- Garret Anderson
- Ian Anderson
- Jim Anderson
- Justin Anderson
- Kent Anderson
- Shaun Anderson
- Tim Anderson
- Tyler Anderson
- Matt Andriese
- Kevin Appier
- Francisco Arcia
- Dan Ardell
- George Arias
- Tony Armas
- José Arredondo
- Ken Aspromonte
- Earl Averill Jr.
- Erick Aybar
- Joe Azcue

== B ==
- Sam Bachman
- Stan Bahnsen
- Scott Bailes
- Andrew Bailey
- Ed Bailey
- John Balaz
- Moisés Ballesteros
- Jett Bandy
- Floyd Bannister
- Steve Barber
- Luke Bard
- Mike Barlow
- Jacob Barnes
- Larry Barnes
- Jim Barr
- Kyle Barraclough
- Franklin Barreto
- Jaime Barría
- Justin Baughman
- Mike Baumann
- Don Baylor
- Chris Beasley
- Gordon Beckham
- Julio Bécquer
- Cam Bedrosian
- Tim Belcher
- Bo Belinsky
- Trevor Bell
- Clay Bellinger
- Anthony Bemboom
- Juan Beníquez
- Dennis Bennett
- Erik Bennett
- Dusty Bergman
- Ken Berry
- Dante Bichette
- Mike Bielecki
- Steve Bilko
- Joe Blanton
- Jabari Blash
- Steve Blateric
- **Bert Blyleven**
- Bruce Bochte
- Brennan Boesch
- Frank Bolick
- Bobby Bonds
- Bob Boone
- Chris Bootcheck
- Pedro Borbón
- Pat Borders
- Toby Borland
- Buddy Boshers
- Shawn Boskie
- Thad Bosley
- Lyman Bostock
- Kent Bottenfield
- Ralph Botting
- Bob Botz
- Justin Bour
- Peter Bourjos
- Mike Bovee
- Ted Bowsfield
- Archie Bradley
- Tom Bradley
- Brian Brady
- Russell Branyan
- Ryan Brasier
- Ken Brett
- Jim Brewer
- José Briceño
- Fritz Brickell
- Rocky Bridges
- Parker Bridwell
- Dan Briggs
- Connor Brogdon
- Bobby Brooks
- Hubie Brooks
- Curt Brown
- Matthew Brown
- Mike Brown
- Randy Brown
- Steve Brown
- Tom Brunansky
- George Brunet
- T.R. Bryden
- Ryan Buchter
- John Buck
- Bill Buckner
- Billy Buckner
- Ryan Budde
- DeWayne Buice
- Jason Bulger
- Dylan Bundy
- Lew Burdette
- Tom Burgess
- Tom Burgmeier
- Brock Burke
- Jamie Burke
- Leo Burke
- Rick Burleson
- Sean Burnett
- Mike Butcher
- Drew Butera
- Ty Buttrey
- Paul Byrd

== C ==
- Trey Cabbage
- Orlando Cabrera
- Kelvin Cáceres
- Greg Cadaret
- Trevor Cahill
- Kole Calhoun
- Willie Calhoun
- Alberto Callaspo
- Mickey Callaway
- Tony Campana
- Bert Campaneris
- Gustavo Campero
- John Candelaria
- Jeimer Candelario
- John Caneira
- Griffin Canning
- José Cardenal
- Leo Cárdenas
- **Rod Carew**
- David Carpenter
- Héctor Carrasco
- Jerry Casale
- Bobby Cassevah
- Jason Castro
- Wayne Causey
- Bob Cerv
- Jhoulys Chacín
- Ray Chadwick
- Andrew Chafin
- Dave Chalk
- Bob Chance
- Dean Chance
- Tyler Chatwood
- Anthony Chavez
- Jesse Chavez
- Ji-Man Choi
- Bruce Christensen
- Jason Christiansen
- Adam Cimber
- Pete Cimino
- Gino Cimoli
- Steve Cishek
- José Cisnero
- Bobby Clark
- Rickey Clark
- Terry Clark
- Alex Claudio
- Mark Clear
- Edgard Clemente
- Pat Clements
- Tex Clevenger
- Stan Cliburn
- Stew Cliburn
- Lou Clinton
- Pete Coachman
- Jim Coates
- Alex Cobb
- Robert Coello
- Mike Colangelo
- Taylor Cole
- Chris Coletta
- Dave Collins
- Bartolo Colón
- Hank Conger
- Tony Conigliaro
- Billy Consolo
- Roansy Contreras
- Dennis Cook
- Mike Cook
- Brian Cooper
- Doug Corbett
- Sherman Corbett
- Rod Correia
- Chuck Cottier
- Marlan Coughtry
- Scott Cousins
- Billy Cowan
- Kaleb Cowart
- Al Cowens
- Collin Cowgill
- Terry Cox
- Zack Cozart
- Chuck Crim
- Cooper Criswell
- Chris Cron
- C.J. Cron
- Hans Crouse
- Todd Cruz
- Mike Cuéllar
- Johnny Cueto
- John Cumberland
- Chad Curtis
- John Curtis
- John Curtiss

== D ==
- John D'Acquisto
- Travis d'Arnaud
- Paul Dade
- Mark Dalesandro
- Caden Dana
- Davis Daniel
- Michael Darrell-Hicks
- Bobby Darwin
- Vic Davalillo
- Jeff DaVanon
- Jerry DaVanon
- Daniel Davidson
- Logan Davidson
- Tucker Davidson
- Alvin Davis
- Bob Davis
- Chili Davis
- Doug Davis
- J.D. Davis
- Mark Davis
- Tommy Davis
- Willie Davis
- Dane De La Rosa
- Doug DeCinces
- Steve Decker
- Charlie Dees
- David DeJesus
- Wilson Delgado
- Rich DeLucia
- Odrisamer Despaigne
- Reid Detmers
- Chris Devenski
- Jairo Díaz
- Jhonathan Díaz
- Jason Dickson
- Frank Dimichele
- Gary DiSarcina
- Chuck Dobson
- John Doherty
- Brendan Donnelly
- Jim Donohue
- Tom Donohue
- John Dopson
- Brian Dorsett
- Jim Dorsey
- Brian Downing
- Scott Downs
- Denny Doyle
- Paul Doyle
- Dick Drago
- Oliver Drake
- Brandon Drury
- Rob Ducey
- Matt Duffy
- Steven Duggar
- Tom Dukes
- Bob Duliba
- Scott Dunn
- Steve Dunning
- Ryne Duren
- Trent Durrington

== E ==
- Mike Easler
- Damion Easley
- Adam Eaton
- David Eckstein
- Steve Eddy
- Ken Edenfield
- Jake Eder
- Jim Edmonds
- Carl Edwards Jr.
- Robert Eenhoorn
- Dick Egan
- Tom Egan
- Cody Ege
- Mark Eichhorn
- Robert Ellis
- Sammy Ellis
- Angelo Encarnación
- Barry Enright
- Jim Eppard
- Mike Epstein
- Darin Erstad
- Eduardo Escobar
- Kelvim Escobar
- Yunel Escobar
- Danny Espinosa
- Carlos Estévez
- Andy Etchebarren
- Seth Etherton
- Terry Evans

== F ==
- Jorge Fábregas
- Ron Fairly
- John Farrell
- Mitch Farris
- Sal Fasano
- Junior Félix
- Joe Ferguson
- José Fermín
- José Fernández
- José Miguel Fernández
- Bob Ferris
- Mike Fetters
- Tommy Field
- Cecil Fielder
- Chone Figgins
- Ed Figueroa
- Jack Fimple
- Chuck Finley
- Steve Finley
- Todd Fischer
- Eddie Fisher
- Mike Fitzgerald
- Al Fitzmorris
- David Fletcher
- Kevin Flora
- Gil Flores
- Hank Foiles
- Tim Foli
- Dan Ford
- Mike Ford
- Ken Forsch
- Terry Forster
- Tim Fortugno
- Alan Foster
- Art Fowler
- Dexter Fowler
- Alan Fowlkes
- Paul Foytack
- Kevin Frandsen
- Willie Fraser
- Adam Frazier
- David Freese
- Jim Fregosi
- Steve Frey
- Ernesto Frieri
- Todd Frohwirth
- Dave Frost
- Brian Fuentes
- Brad Fullmer
- Carson Fulmer
- Michael Fulmer
- Mike Fyhrie

== G ==
- Len Gabrielson
- Gary Gaetti
- Andrés Galarraga
- Al Gallagher
- Dave Gallagher
- Ron Gant
- Carlos García
- Luis García
- Miguel García
- Jon Garland
- Ralph Garr
- Adrian Garrett
- Amir Garrett
- Greg Garrett
- Ned Garver
- Aubrey Gatewood
- Vern Geishert
- Steve Geltz
- Craig Gerber
- Johnny Giavotella
- Benji Gil
- Bill Gilbreth
- Lucas Giolito
- Troy Glaus
- Gary Glover
- Greg Gohr
- Dave Goltz
- Larry Gonzales
- Rene Gonzales
- José González
- Tony González
- Niko Goodrum
- Brian Goodwin
- Danny Goodwin
- Nick Gorneault
- Phil Gosselin
- Julio Gotay
- Trevor Gott
- Billy Grabarkewitz
- Joe Grahe
- Juan Graterol
- Eli Grba
- Craig Grebeck
- Grant Green
- Lenny Green
- Steve Green
- Todd Greene
- Kevin Gregg
- Tom Gregorio
- Zack Greinke
- Bobby Grich
- Randal Grichuk
- Doug Griffin
- Tom Griffin
- Jason Grilli
- Jason Grimsley
- Vaughn Grissom
- Kevin Gross
- Jarrett Grube
- Kelly Gruber
- Mark Gubicza
- Deolis Guerra
- Javy Guerra
- Junior Guerra
- Mario Guerrero
- **Vladimir Guerrero**
- José Guillén
- Luis Guillorme
- Jason Gurka
- J. C. Gutiérrez
- Denzer Guzmán
- Marcus Gwyn

== H ==
- John Habyan
- Ed Halicki
- Jimmie Hall
- Shane Halter
- Jack Hamilton
- Josh Hamilton
- Ken Hamlin
- Ike Hampton
- Ryan Hancock
- Rich Hand
- Tommy Hanson
- Dan Haren
- Mike Harkey
- Larry Harlow
- Brian Harper
- Tommy Harper
- Bill Harrelson
- Brendan Harris
- John Harris
- Pep Harris
- Monte Harrison
- Paul Hartzell
- Bryan Harvey
- Matt Harvey
- Shigetoshi Hasegawa
- Andy Hassler
- Hilly Hathaway
- LaTroy Hawkins
- Brad Hawpe
- Von Hayes
- Nathan Haynes
- Andrew Heaney
- Bob Heffner
- Tyler Heineman
- Bob Heise
- Woodie Held
- Russ Heman
- Bret Hemphill
- **Rickey Henderson**
- George Hendrick
- Kyle Hendricks
- Matt Hensley
- Jimmy Herget
- Michael Hermosillo
- David Hernandez
- Jackie Hernández
- Yoslán Herrera
- Ed Herrmann
- John Hester
- Jack Hiatt
- Jim Hibbs
- Aaron Hicks
- Jim Hicks
- Donnie Hill
- Glenallen Hill
- Ken Hill
- Rich Hill
- Shea Hillenbrand
- Brett Hinchliffe
- Chuck Hinton
- Keston Hiura
- Butch Hobson
- Chuck Hockenbery
- Glenn Hoffman
- Al Holland
- Dave Hollins
- Mike Holtz
- Mark Holzemer
- Doug Howard
- Jack Howell
- Rex Hudler
- Charlie Hudson
- Joe Hudson
- Terry Humphrey
- Ken Hunt
- Torii Hunter
- Jeff Huson

== I ==
- Chris Iannetta
- Raúl Ibañez
- Edgar Ibarra
- José Iglesias
- Raisel Iglesias
- Kolton Ingram
- Jason Isringhausen
- Maicer Izturis

== J ==
- Bo Jackson
- **Reggie Jackson**
- Ron Jackson
- Johnny James
- Mike James
- Kenley Jansen
- Stan Javier
- Jon Jay
- Gregg Jefferies
- Jesse Jefferson
- Kevin Jepsen
- Williams Jerez
- Jake Jewell
- Luis Jiménez
- Tommy John
- Alex Johnson
- Gary Johnson
- Jim Johnson
- Keith Johnson
- Lou Johnson
- Mark Johnson
- Ryan Johnson
- Sherman Johnson
- Jay Johnstone
- Bob Jones
- Greg Jones
- Jahmai Jones
- Ruppert Jones
- Ben Joyce
- Matt Joyce
- Wally Joyner
- Jeff Juden
- Janson Junk

== K ==
- Scott Karl
- Curt Kaufman
- Niko Kavadas
- Scott Kazmir
- Steve Kealey
- Pat Keedy
- Mick Kelleher
- Kyle Keller
- Bill Kelso
- Howie Kendrick
- Adam Kennedy
- Brett Kerry
- Carter Kieboom
- Yusei Kikuchi
- Scott Kingery
- Dave Kingman
- Ian Kinsler
- Bob Kipper
- Ed Kirkpatrick
- Don Kirkwood
- Bruce Kison
- George Klassen
- Ron Kline
- Ted Kluszewski
- Chris Knapp
- Bobby Knoop
- Jack Kochanowicz
- Michael Kohn
- Joe Koppe
- Andy Kosco
- Frank Kostro
- Casey Kotchman
- Ray Krawczyk
- Chad Kreuter
- Zac Kristofak
- Ian Krol
- Jack Kruger
- Kyle Kubitza
- Gil Kubski
- Fred Kuhaulua
- Art Kusnyer

== L ==
- Tommy La Stella
- Bob Lacey
- John Lackey
- Frank LaCorte
- Juan Lagares
- Joe Lahoud
- Jake Lamb
- John Lamb
- Ken Landreaux
- Dick Lange
- Ryan Langerhans
- Mark Langston
- Carney Lansford
- Dave LaRoche
- Fred Lasher
- Barry Latman
- Mat Latos
- Jack Lazorko
- Charles Leblanc
- Wade LeBlanc
- Bob Lee
- Don Lee
- Mike Lee
- Gene Leek
- Craig Lefferts
- Phil Leftwich
- Mark Leiter
- Frank Leja
- Dave Lemanczyk
- Dominic Leone
- Al Levine
- Scott Lewis
- Jim Leyritz
- Rufino Linares
- Tim Lincecum
- José Lind
- Doug Linton
- Winston Llenas
- Bobby Locke
- Skip Lockwood
- Carlos López
- Jack López
- Marcelino López
- Nicky Lopez
- Ramón López
- Reynaldo Lopez
- Michael Lorenzen
- Andrew Lorraine
- Aaron Loup
- Shane Loux
- Vance Lovelace
- Torey Lovullo
- Josh Lowe
- Mark Lowe
- Steve Lubratich
- Gary Lucas
- Joey Lucchesi
- Jonathan Lucroy
- Matthew Lugo
- Urbano Lugo
- Mark Lukasiewicz
- Matt Luke
- Keith Luuloa
- Fred Lynn
- Barry Lyons

== M ==
- Dave Machemer
- Tony Mack
- David MacKinnon
- Nick Madrigal
- Mike Magnante
- Joe Magrane
- Greg Mahle
- Mickey Mahler
- Martín Maldonado
- Jim Maloney
- Frank Malzone
- Trey Mancini
- Alek Manoah
- Nick Maronde
- Brandon Marsh
- Mike Marshall
- Jefry Marté
- José Marte
- Norberto Martin
- Trevor Martin
- Alfredo Martínez
- Carlos Martínez
- Omar Martínez
- Damon Mashore
- Jeff Mathis
- Dave Matranga
- Hideki Matsui
- Gary Matthews Jr.
- Carlos May
- Darrell May
- Rudy May
- Cameron Maybin
- Mike Mayers
- Jack Mayfield
- Paul McAnulty
- Ken McBride
- Kirk McCaskill
- Bob McClure
- Tommy McCraw
- Garrett McDaniels
- John McDonald
- Jack McDowell
- Chuck McElroy
- Orlando McFarlane
- Jim McGlothlin
- Byron McLaughlin
- Mark McLemore
- Ken McMullen
- Dallas McPherson
- Wade Meckler
- Víctor Mederos
- Adalberto Mejía
- Bill Melton
- Rudy Meoli
- Kent Mercker
- Lou Merloni
- Andy Messersmith
- Alex Meyer
- Bob Meyer
- Bart Miadich
- Keynan Middleton
- Mike Miley
- Darrell Miller
- Dyar Miller
- Rick Miller
- Ryan Miller
- Brad Mills
- Hoby Milner
- Don Mincher
- Greg Minton
- Steve Mintz
- Ron Moeller
- Bengie Molina
- José Molina
- Yoán Moncada
- Raúl Mondesí
- Sid Monge
- Mickey Moniak
- John Montague
- Willie Montañez
- Aurelio Monteagudo
- Rich Monteleone
- Balor Moore
- Christian Moore
- Donnie Moore
- Jeremy Moore
- Matt Moore
- Kendrys Morales
- Billy Moran
- Brian Moran
- Ángel Moreno
- José Moreno
- Tom Morgan
- Mike Morin
- Reyes Moronta
- John Morris
- Bubba Morton
- Robert Mosebach
- Dustin Moseley
- Jerry Moses
- Curt Motton
- Mike Moustakas
- Rance Mulliniks
- David Murphy
- Luke Murphy
- Tom Murphy
- Tommy Murphy
- **Eddie Murray**
- Greg Myers

== N ==
- Mike Napoli
- Jerry Narron
- Samy Natera Jr.
- Packy Naughton
- Efren Navarro
- Julio Navarro
- Chris Nelson
- Gene Nelson
- Mel Nelson
- Héctor Neris
- Zach Neto
- Morris Nettles
- Phil Nevin
- Fred Newman
- Kevin Newman
- Jerry Nielsen
- Kirk Nieuwenhuis
- José Nieves
- Junior Noboa
- Gary Nolan
- Ricky Nolasco
- Tim Nordbrook
- Bud Norris
- Joe Nuxhall

== O ==
- Mike O'Berry
- Charlie O'Brien
- Syd O'Brien
- Darren O'Day
- Logan O'Hoppe
- Shawn O'Malley
- Sean O'Sullivan
- Brett Oberholtzer
- Ken Oberkfell
- Alex Ochoa
- Shohei Ohtani
- Chris Okey
- Omar Olivares
- Bob Oliver
- Darren Oliver
- Anthony Ortega
- Oliver Ortega
- Phil Ortega
- Ramón Ortiz
- John Orton
- Dan Osinski
- Ed Ott
- Mike Overy
- Spike Owen
- Eric Owens
- Ray Oyler

== P ==
- Joe Pactwa
- Kevin Padlo
- Orlando Palmeiro
- Matt Palmer
- Kyren Paris
- Billy Parker
- Blake Parker
- **Dave Parker**
- Lance Parrish
- Freddie Patek
- Bob Patterson
- Ken Patterson
- Marty Pattin
- Josh Paul
- David Pauley
- Albie Pearson
- Elvis Peguero
- Félix Peña
- Orlando Peña
- Brad Pennington
- Cliff Pennington
- Joel Peralta
- Sammy Peralta
- Oswald Peraza
- Troy Percival
- Carlos Pérez
- Eduardo Pérez
- Marty Perez
- Matt Perisho
- Ron Perranoski
- Bob Perry
- Vinnie Pestano
- Dillon Peters
- Yusmeiro Petit
- Mark Petkovsek
- Jake Petricka
- Dan Petry
- Gary Pettis
- Chris Pettit
- Brandon Phillips
- Brett Phillips
- Tony Phillips
- Rob Picciolo
- Ron Piché
- Jim Piersall
- Kevin Pillar
- Horacio Piña
- Joel Piñeiro
- Vada Pinson
- Zach Plesac
- Gus Polidor
- Luis Polonia
- Drew Pomeranz
- Logan Porter
- Lou Pote
- Vic Power
- Bob Priddy
- Curtis Pride
- Chris Prieto
- Bret Prinz
- Chris Pritchett
- Albert Pujols

== Q ==
- Mel Queen
- José Quijada
- Robb Quinlan
- José Quintana
- Luis Quintana

== R ==
- Horacio Ramírez
- J. C. Ramírez
- Julio Ramírez
- Noé Ramirez
- Orlando Ramírez
- A. J. Ramos
- Cesar Ramos
- Domingo Ramos
- Merritt Ranew
- Pat Rapp
- Cory Rasmus
- Doug Rau
- Johnny Ray
- Barry Raziano
- Joe Redfield
- Howie Reed
- Rick Reichardt
- Jerry Remy
- Anthony Rendon
- Hunter Renfroe
- Luis Rengifo
- Steve Renko
- Roger Repoz
- Chris Resop
- Merv Rettenmund
- Jerry Reuss
- Ben Revere
- Gerardo Reyes
- Jo-Jo Reyes
- Archie Reynolds
- Harold Reynolds
- Tommie Reynolds
- Del Rice
- Garrett Richards
- Jeff Richardson
- Adam Riggs
- Juan Rivera
- René Rivera
- Sebastián Rivero
- Mickey Rivers
- Rich Robertson
- Don Robinson
- **Frank Robinson**
- Jeff Robinson
- Hansel Robles
- Buck Rodgers
- Fernando Rodney
- Aurelio Rodríguez
- Chris Rodriguez
- Ellie Rodríguez
- Fernando Rodriguez
- Francisco Rodríguez (Mexico)
- Francisco Rodríguez (Venezuela)
- Grayson Rodriguez
- José Rodríguez
- Rafael Rodríguez
- Rich Rodriguez
- Sean Rodriguez
- José Rojas
- Minnie Rojas
- Ron Romanick
- Jordan Romano
- J. C. Romero
- Andrew Romine
- Austin Romine
- Phil Roof
- Bobby Rose
- Don Rose
- Kenny Rosenberg
- Gary Ross
- Michael Roth
- Ben Rowen
- Jorge Rubio
- Drew Rucinski
- Joe Rudi
- Vern Ruhle
- Chico Ruiz
- Mark Ryal
- Michael Ryan
- **Nolan Ryan**

== S ==
- Bob Sadowski
- Ed Sadowski
- Fernando Salas
- Tim Salmon
- Bill Sampen
- Luis Sánchez
- Ken Sanders
- Scott Sanderson
- Nick Sandlin
- Freddy Sandoval
- Patrick Sandoval
- Charlie Sands
- Jack Sanford
- Miguel Sanó
- Ervin Santana
- Hector Santiago
- Tom Satriano
- Tayler Saucedo
- Joe Saunders
- Paul Schaal
- Nolan Schanuel
- Richie Scheinblum
- Jeff Schmidt
- Scott Schoeneweis
- Dick Schofield
- Bill Schroeder
- Rick Schu
- Dave Schuler
- Jeff Schwarz
- Daryl Sconiers
- Darryl Scott
- Mickey Scott
- Troy Scribner
- Jean Segura
- Aaron Sele
- Dave Sells
- Dick Selma
- Sam Selman
- Ray Semproch
- Alex Serrano
- Harvey Shank
- Andy Sheets
- Larry Sherry
- Scot Shields
- Craig Shipley
- Costen Shockley
- Matt Shoemaker
- JB Shuck
- Norm Siebern
- Magneuris Sierra
- Chase Silseth
- Tom Silverio
- Dave Silvestri
- Andrelton Simmons
- Curt Simmons
- Dick Simpson
- Wayne Simpson
- Bill Singer
- Jose Siri
- Dave Skaggs
- Tyler Skaggs
- Bill Skowron
- Jim Slaton
- Don Slaught
- Aaron Slegers
- Billy Smith
- Bob Smith
- Dave Smith
- Dwight Smith
- Joe Smith
- Kevan Smith
- **Lee Smith**
- Willie Smith
- J. T. Snow
- Luis Sojo
- Tony Solaita
- Jorge Soler
- Zach Sorensen
- José Soriano
- Elliot Soto
- Geovany Soto
- Liván Soto
- Al Spangler
- Steve Sparks
- Justin Speier
- Jim Spencer
- Scott Spiezio
- Jack Spring
- Dennis Springer
- Russ Springer
- Bob Sprout
- Daniel Stange
- Leroy Stanton
- Max Stassi
- Michael Stefanic
- Rick Steirer
- Rick Stelmaszek
- John Stephenson
- Robert Stephenson
- Chad Stevens
- Lee Stevens
- Ian Stewart
- Kurt Stillwell
- Kevin Stocker
- Brian Stokes
- Bill Stoneman
- Chris Stratton
- Huston Street
- Hunter Strickland
- Dick Stuart
- Moose Stubing
- José Suárez
- Bill Sudakis
- Ed Sukla
- Brent Suter
- **Don Sutton**
- Kurt Suzuki
- Craig Swan
- Paul Swingle
- Noah Syndergaard

== T ==
- Hisanori Takahashi
- Frank Tanana
- Chuck Tanner
- Jarvis Tatum
- Ken Tatum
- Andrew Taylor
- Chris Taylor
- Hawk Taylor
- Junichi Tazawa
- Julio Teherán
- Mark Teixeira
- Bryce Teodosio
- Ryan Tepera
- Matt Thaiss
- Joe Thatcher
- Derrel Thomas
- Dillon Thomas
- George Thomas
- Lee Thomas
- Jason Thompson
- Rich Thompson
- Dickie Thon
- Faye Throneberry
- Luis Tiant
- Ron Tingley
- Jeff Torborg
- Félix Torres
- Rusty Torres
- Touki Toussaint
- Bill Travers
- Bobby Treviño
- Nick Tropeano
- Mike Trout
- Mark Trumbo
- Cole Tucker
- Bob Turley
- Derrick Turnbow
- Chris Turner
- Ken Turner
- Kyle Tyler

== U ==
- Tim Unroe
- Justin Upton
- José Ureña
- Walbert Ureña
- Gio Urshela

== V ==
- Luis Valbuena
- César Valdez
- Ismael Valdéz
- José Valdez
- Bobby Valentine
- Ellis Valentine
- Fernando Valenzuela
- Julio Valera
- Ty Van Burkleo
- Ben Van Ryn
- Jason Vargas
- Mo Vaughn
- Randy Velarde
- Andrew Velazquez
- Gil Velazquez
- Max Venable
- John Verhoeven
- Shane Victorino
- Jonathan Villar
- Charlie Vinson
- Bill Voss

== W ==
- LaMonte Wade Jr.
- Tyler Wade
- Eric Wagaman
- Leon Wagner
- Matt Walbeck
- Jordan Walden
- Jim Walewander
- Chico Walker
- Tom Walker
- Donne Wall
- Josh Wall
- Don Wallace
- Chad Wallach
- Tim Wallach
- Jared Walsh
- Nash Walters
- Donovan Walton
- Jerome Walton
- Andrew Wantz
- Dick Wantz
- Bryan Ward
- Taylor Ward
- Jackie Warner
- Austin Warren
- Greg Washburn
- Jarrod Washburn
- Claudell Washington
- Allen Watson
- Ryan Watson
- Tony Watson
- Eric Weaver
- Jeff Weaver
- Jered Weaver
- Jim Weaver
- Jacob Webb
- Ben Weber
- Blake Weiman
- Zack Weiss
- Vernon Wells
- Johnny Werhas
- Barry Wesson
- Gary Wheelock
- Devon White
- Aaron Whitefield
- Dan Whitmer
- Rob Wilfong
- **Hoyt Wilhelm**
- Nick Willhite
- Jerome Williams
- Mitch Williams
- Reggie Williams
- Shad Williams
- Reggie Willits
- Terry Wilshusen
- Bobby Wilson
- C. J. Wilson
- Tack Wilson
- Trevor Wilson
- Gordie Windhorn
- **Dave Winfield**
- Matt Wise
- George Witt
- Mike Witt
- Wally Wolf
- Kean Wong
- Blake Wood
- Brandon Wood
- Jake Woods
- Shawn Wooten
- Clyde Wright
- Daniel Wright
- Wesley Wright
- Butch Wynegar
- Billy Wynne

== Y ==
- Esteban Yan
- Kirby Yates
- Eddie Yost
- Chris Young
- Cliff Young
- Eric Young Jr.

== Z ==
- Geoff Zahn
- Rob Zastryzny
- Ryan Zeferjahn
- Guillermo Zuñiga
