= 2021 Los Angeles Angels season =

Major League Baseball season

2021 Los Angeles Angels
- League: American League
- Division: West
- Ballpark: Angel Stadium
- City: Anaheim, California
- Record: 77–85 (.475)
- Divisional place: 4th
- Owner: Arte Moreno
- Manager: Joe Maddon
- Television: Bally Sports West (Matt Vasgersian/Rich Waltz/Daron Sutton (Note: Sutton was released on July 11.)/Patrick O'Neal, Mark Gubicza, José Mota)
- Radio: KLAA (AM 830); KSPN (AM 710); Angels Radio Network (Terry Smith, Mark Langston, José Mota); Spanish: KWKW (AM 1330)
- Stats: ESPN.com; Baseball Reference

The 2021 Los Angeles Angels season was the 61st season of the Angels franchise in the American League, the 56th in Anaheim, and their 56th season playing their home games at Angel Stadium. The Angels were managed by Joe Maddon in his second season as manager of the Angels. They play their home games at Angel Stadium as members of Major League Baseball's American League West Division. On September 21, the Angels were eliminated from the postseason. This was the seventh straight season without making the postseason (the third longest drought in team history) and the sixth in a row with a losing record (the worst span since the 1971–77 seasons).

The season was also the first for play-by-play commentators Matt Vasgersian and Daron Sutton who assumed a split role after the departure of Victor Rojas. The Angels parted ways with Sutton midway through the season.

== Previous season ==
The Angels finished the 2020 season 26–34 to finish in 4th place in the AL West division, missing the playoffs for the sixth consecutive year.

== Regular season ==
=== Season standings ===
==== American League West ====
AL West
Team	W	L	Pct.	GB	Home	Road
Houston Astros	95	67	.586	—	51‍–‍30	44‍–‍37
Seattle Mariners	90	72	.556	5	46‍–‍35	44‍–‍37
Oakland Athletics	86	76	.531	9	43‍–‍38	43‍–‍38
Los Angeles Angels	77	85	.475	18	40‍–‍42	37‍–‍43
Texas Rangers	60	102	.370	35	36‍–‍45	24‍–‍57

Division leaders
Team	W	L	Pct.
Tampa Bay Rays	100	62	.617
Houston Astros	95	67	.586
Chicago White Sox	93	69	.574

Wild Card teams (Top 2 teams qualify for postseason)
Team	W	L	Pct.	GB
Boston Red Sox	92	70	.568	—
New York Yankees	92	70	.568	—
Toronto Blue Jays	91	71	.562	1
Seattle Mariners	90	72	.556	2
Oakland Athletics	86	76	.531	6
Cleveland Indians	80	82	.494	12
Los Angeles Angels	77	85	.475	15
Detroit Tigers	77	85	.475	15
Kansas City Royals	74	88	.457	18
Minnesota Twins	73	89	.451	19
Texas Rangers	60	102	.370	32
Baltimore Orioles	52	110	.321	40

=== Record against opponents ===
2021 American League record Source: MLB Standings Grid – 2021
Team	BAL	BOS	CWS	CLE	DET	HOU	KC	LAA	MIN	NYY	OAK	SEA	TB	TEX	TOR	NL
Baltimore	—	6–13	0–7	2–5	2–5	3–3	4–3	2–4	2–4	8–11	3–3	3–4	1–18	4–3	5–14	7–13
Boston	13–6	—	3–4	4–2	3–3	2–5	5–2	3–3	5–2	10–9	3–3	4–3	8–11	3–4	10–9	16–4
Chicago	7–0	4–3	—	10–9	12–7	2–5	9–10	2–5	13–6	1–5	4–3	3–3	3–3	5–1	4–3	14–6
Cleveland	5–2	2–4	9–10	—	12–7	1–6	14–5	5–1	8–11	3–4	2–4	3–4	1–6	4–2	2–5	9–11
Detroit	5–2	3–3	7–12	7–12	—	5–2	8–11	1–6	8–11	3–3	1–6	5–1	4–3	6–1	3–3	11–9
Houston	3–3	5–2	5–2	6–1	2–5	—	3–4	13–6	3–4	2–4	11–8	11–8	4–2	14–5	4–2	9–11
Kansas City	3–4	2–5	10–9	5–14	11–8	4–3	—	2–4	10–9	2–4	2–5	4–3	2–4	2–4	3–4	12–8
Los Angeles	4–2	3–3	5–2	1–5	6–1	6–13	4–2	—	5–2	4–3	4–15	8–11	1–6	11–8	4–3	11–9
Minnesota	4–2	2–5	6–13	11–8	11–8	4–3	9–10	2–5	—	1–6	1–5	2–4	3–3	4–3	3–4	10–10
New York	11–8	9–10	5–1	4–3	3–3	4–2	4–2	3–4	6–1	—	4–3	5–2	8–11	6–1	8–11	12–8
Oakland	3–3	3–3	3–4	4–2	6–1	8–11	5–2	15–4	5–1	3–4	—	4–15	4–3	10–9	2–5	11–9
Seattle	4–3	3–4	3–3	4–3	1–5	8–11	3–4	11–8	4–2	2–5	15–4	—	6–1	13–6	4–2	9–11
Tampa Bay	18–1	11–8	3–3	6–1	3–4	2–4	4–2	6–1	3–3	11–8	3–4	1–6	—	3–4	11–8	15–5
Texas	3–4	4–3	1–5	2–4	1–6	5–14	4–2	8–11	3–4	1–6	9–10	6–13	4–3	—	2–4	7–13
Toronto	14–5	9–10	3–4	5–2	3–3	2–4	4–3	3–4	4–3	11–8	5–2	2–4	8–11	4–2	—	14–6

Updated with the results of all games through October 3, 2021.

=== Opening Day starters ===
Opening Day starters
Name	Position
David Fletcher	2B
Shohei Ohtani	DH
Mike Trout	CF
Anthony Rendon	3B
Justin Upton	LF
Albert Pujols	1B
Jose Iglesias	SS
Max Stassi	C
Dexter Fowler	RF

=== 2021 regular-season batting stats ===
Note: POS = Position; G = Games played; AB = At bats; R = Runs scored; H = Hits; 2B = Doubles; 3B = Triples; HR = Home runs; RBI = Runs batted in; BB = Walks; SB = Stolen bases; AVG = Batting average; OBP = On-base percentage plus slugging; SLG = Slugging percentage; OPS = On-base percentage plus slugging

Player	POS	G	AB	R	H	2B	3B	HR	RBI	BB	SB	AVG	OBP	SLG	OPS
Anthony Bemboom	C	8	27	2	6	0	0	0	2	1	0	.222	.250	.222	.472
Kurt Suzuki	C	72	219	17	49	8	0	6	16	12	0	.224	.294	.342	.636
David Fletcher	2B	157	626	74	164	27	3	2	47	31	15	.262	.297	.324	.622
Jose Iglesias	SS	114	424	57	110	23	1	8	41	18	5	.259	.295	.375	.670
Albert Pujols	DH	24	86	9	17	0	0	5	12	3	1	.198	.250	.372	.622
Anthony Rendon	3B	58	217	24	52	13	0	6	34	29	0	.240	.329	.382	.712
Luis Rengifo	3B	54	174	22	35	1	0	6	18	9	1	.201	.246	.310	.556
Jared Walsh	1B	144	530	70	147	34	1	29	98	48	2	.277	.340	.509	.850
Matt Thaiss	1B	3	7	1	1	0	0	0	0	1	0	.143	.250	.143	.393
Adam Eaton	RF	25	65	5	13	2	0	1	2	2	1	.200	.232	.277	.509
Dexter Fowler	RF	7	20	3	5	0	0	0	1	1	1	.250	.286	.250	.536
Mike Trout	CF	36	117	23	39	8	1	8	18	27	2	.333	.466	.624	1.090
Justin Upton	LF	89	318	47	67	12	0	17	41	39	4	.211	.296	.409	.705
Jo Adell	LF	35	130	17	32	5	2	4	26	8	2	.246	.295	.408	.703
Jon Jay	LF	5	14	2	5	0	0	0	1	0	0	.357	.357	.357	.714
Taylor Ward	RF	65	208	33	52	15	0	8	33	20	1	.250	.332	.438	.769
Shohei Ohtani	DH	155	537	103	138	26	8	46	100	96	26	.257	.372	.592	.965
Kean Wong	2B	32	60	3	10	2	1	0	6	2	0	.167	.194	.233	.427
Phil Gosselin	3B	104	345	40	90	14	0	7	47	24	4	.261	.314	.362	.676
Jack Mayfield	3B	75	232	28	52	14	0	10	36	16	5	.224	.282	.414	.696
Max Stassi	C	87	282	45	68	11	1	13	35	28	0	.241	.326	.426	.752
Drew Butera	C	12	32	1	3	1	0	0	5	0	0	.094	.091	.125	.216
Jack Kruger	C	1	0	0	0	0	0	0	0	0	0	.---	.---	.---	.---
José Rojas	2B	61	168	26	35	14	0	6	15	15	2	.208	.277	.399	.676
Juan Lagares	CF	112	309	39	73	20	2	6	38	12	1	.236	.266	.372	.638
Brandon Marsh	CF	70	236	27	60	12	3	2	19	20	6	.254	.317	.356	.673
Scott Schebler	CF	14	34	3	5	3	0	0	0	0	0	.147	.147	.235	.382
Pitcher totals	—	162	20	2	3	0	0	0	0	2	0	.150	.227	.150	.377
Team totals	—	162	5437	723	1531	265	23	190	691	464	79	.245	.310	.407	.717

(Updated stats through October 3, 2021)

=== 2021 regular-season pitching stats ===
Note: W = Wins; L = Losses; ERA = Earned run average; G = Games pitched; GS = Games started; SV = Saves; IP = Innings pitched; H = Hits allowed; R = Runs allowed; ER = Earned runs allowed; BB = Walks allowed, SO = Strikeouts

Player	W	L	ERA	G	GS	SV	IP	H	R	ER	BB	SO
Jaime Barria	2	4	4.61	13	11	0	56.2	70	29	29	19	35
Anthony Bemboom	0	0	18.00	1	0	0	1.0	3	2	2	0	0
Dylan Bundy	2	9	6.06	23	19	0	90.2	89	64	61	34	84
Griffin Canning	5	4	5.60	14	13	0	62.2	65	41	39	28	62
Steve Cishek	0	2	3.42	74	0	0	68.1	61	32	26	41	64
Alex Claudio	1	2	5.51	41	0	1	32.2	37	22	20	15	30
Alex Cobb	8	3	3.76	18	18	0	93.1	85	46	39	33	98
Cooper Criswell	0	1	20.25	1	1	0	1.1	6	3	3	0	0
Reid Detmers	1	3	7.40	5	5	0	20.2	26	17	17	11	19
Jhonathan Díaz	1	0	4.15	3	2	0	13.0	11	6	6	7	9
Adam Eaton	0	0	0.00	1	0	0	1.0	2	0	0	0	0
Junior Guerra	5	2	6.06	41	1	0	65.1	67	45	44	46	61
Andrew Heaney	6	7	5.27	18	18	0	94.0	92	56	55	31	113
Jimmy Herget	2	2	4.30	14	0	0	14.2	15	7	7	4	18
James Hoyt	0	0	6.75	9	0	0	8.0	12	10	6	7	11
Raisel Iglesias	7	5	2.57	65	0	34	70.0	53	25	20	12	103
Janson Junk	0	1	3.86	4	4	0	16.1	20	11	7	2	10
José Marte	0	1	9.00	4	0	0	4.0	4	5	4	3	5
Mike Mayers	5	5	3.84	72	2	2	75.0	71	32	32	26	90
Packy Naughton	0	4	6.35	7	5	0	22.2	27	18	16	14	12
Shohei Ohtani	9	2	3.18	23	23	0	130.1	98	48	46	44	156
Oliver Ortega	1	0	4.82	8	0	0	9.1	12	5	5	2	4
Elvis Peguero	0	1	27.00	3	0	0	2.1	7	7	7	3	0
Félix Peña	0	0	37.80	2	0	0	1.2	7	7	7	4	2
Jake Petricka	0	1	15.00	7	0	0	6.0	6	10	10	7	8
José Quijada	0	2	4.56	26	0	0	25.2	20	14	13	15	38
José Quintana	0	3	6.75	24	10	0	53.1	66	45	40	29	73
Noé Ramirez	0	0	5.40	2	0	0	3.1	5	2	2	1	0
AJ Ramos	0	0	0.00	4	0	0	4.2	0	0	0	2	3
Chris Rodriguez	2	1	3.64	15	2	0	29.2	28	14	12	15	29
Ben Rowen	0	0	5.56	8	0	0	11.1	12	8	7	2	8
Patrick Sandoval	3	6	3.62	17	14	1	87.0	69	38	35	36	94
Sam Selman	0	1	6.35	18	0	0	17.0	16	13	12	8	11
Aaron Slegers	2	2	6.97	29	0	0	31.0	43	24	24	15	25
Hunter Strickland	0	0	9.95	9	0	0	6.1	11	9	7	4	4
José Suárez	8	8	3.75	23	14	0	98.1	85	45	41	36	85
Kyle Tyler	0	0	2.92	5	0	0	12.1	8	4	4	6	6
Andrew Wantz	1	0	4.94	21	0	0	27.1	23	17	15	11	38
Austin Warren	3	0	1.77	16	0	1	20.1	16	5	4	5	20
Tony Watson	3	3	4.64	36	0	0	33.0	25	18	17	14	25
Team totals	77	85	4.69	162	162	39	1421.2	1373	804	741	592	1453

(Updated stats through October 3, 2021)

== Game log ==
2021 Game Log: 77–85 (Home: 39–42; Away: 38–43)
April: 12–12 (Home: 6–4; Away: 6–8)

#	Date	Opponent	Score	Win	Loss	Save	Attendance	Record	Box/Streak
1	April 1	White Sox	4–3	**Mayers** (1–0)	Bummer (0–1)	**Iglesias** (1)	13,207	1–0	W1
2	April 2	White Sox	8–12	Kopech (1–0)	**Heaney** (0–1)	Hendriks (1)	12,763	1–1	L1
3	April 3	White Sox	5–3	**Guerra** (1–0)	Marshall (0–1)	—	12,043	2–1	W1
4	April 4	White Sox	7–4	**Iglesias** (1–0)	Ruiz (0–1)	—	12,396	3–1	W2
5	April 5	Astros	7–6	**Watson** (1–0)	Smith (0–1)	**Mayers** (1)	13,447	4–1	W3
6	April 6	Astros	2–4	Pressly (1–0)	**Iglesias** (1–1)	—	11,122	4–2	L1
7	April 8	@ Blue Jays	7–5 (11)	**Guerra** (2–0)	Borucki (1–1)	**Iglesias** (2)	1,348	5–2	W1
8	April 9	@ Blue Jays	7–1	**Heaney** (1–1)	Zeuch (0–1)	—	1,523	6–2	W2
9	April 10	@ Blue Jays	1–15	Matz (2–0)	**Quintana** (0–1)	Milone (1)	1,292	6–3	L1
–	April 11	@ Blue Jays	Postponed (Rain, Makeup August 10)						
10	April 12	@ Royals	10–3	**Cobb** (1–0)	Singer (0–2)	—	6,962	7–3	W1
11	April 13	@ Royals	2–3	Duffy (2–0)	**Bundy** (0–1)	Holland (1)	6,404	7–4	L1
12	April 14	@ Royals	1–6	Keller (1–1)	**Canning** (0–1)	—	6,814	7–5	L2
13	April 16	Twins	10–3	**Slegers** (1–0)	Dobnak (0–3)	—	13,428	8–5	W1
—	April 17	Twins	Postponed (COVID-19; Makeup: May 20)						
—	April 18	Twins	Postponed (COVID-19; Makeup: May 20)						
14	April 19	Rangers	4–6	Arihara (2–1)	**Bundy** (0–2)	Kennedy (4)	11,396	8–6	L1
15	April 20	Rangers	6–2	**Canning** (1–1)	Lyles (1–1)	—	12,544	9–6	W1
16	April 21	Rangers	4–7	King (2–0)	**Mayers** (1–1)	—	9,207	9–7	L1
17	April 22	@ Astros	2–8	Javier (2–0)	**Cobb** (1–1)	—	13,985	9–8	L2
18	April 23	@ Astros	4–5 (10)	Pressly (2–0)	**Iglesias** (1–2)	—	21,728	9–9	L3
19	April 24	@ Astros	2–16	Emanuel (1–0)	**Canning** (1–2)	—	21,820	9–10	L4
20	April 25	@ Astros	4–2	**Rodriguez** (1–0)	García (0–2)	**Iglesias** (3)	21,781	10–10	W1
21	April 26	@ Rangers	9–4	**Ohtani** (1–0)	Lyles (1–2)	—	17,766	11–10	W2
22	April 27	@ Rangers	1–6	Foltynewicz (1–3)	**Quintana** (0–2)	—	16,103	11–11	L1
23	April 28	@ Rangers	4–3	**Rodriguez** (2–0)	Dunning (1–1)	**Iglesias** (4)	17,875	12–11	W1
24	April 30	@ Mariners	4–7	Steckenrider (2–1)	**Heaney** (1–2)	—	8,632	12–12	L1

May: 12–18 (Home: 7–10; Away: 5–8)

#	Date	Opponent	Score	Win	Loss	Save	Attendance	Record	Streak
25	May 1	@ Mariners	10–5	**Canning** (2–2)	Newsome (1–1)	—	8,993	13–12	W1
26	May 2	@ Mariners	0–2	Sheffield (2–2)	**Bundy** (0–3)	Montero (4)	9,000	13–13	L1
27	May 3	Rays	3–7	Glasnow (4–1)	**Quintana** (0–3)	—	10,641	13–14	L2
28	May 4	Rays	3–8	Patiño (1–0)	**Cobb** (1–2)	—	8,152	13–15	L3
29	May 5	Rays	1–3	Yarbrough (2–3)	**Guerra** (2–1)	Springs (2)	9,169	13–16	L4
30	May 6	Rays	3–8	Fleming (2–3)	**Mayers** (1–2)	—	8,840	13–17	L5
31	May 7	Dodgers	9–2	**Canning** (3–2)	Urías (4–1)	**Sandoval** (1)	15,316	14–17	W1
32	May 8	Dodgers	11–14	Kershaw (5–3)	**Bundy** (0–4)	Treinen (1)	15,274	14–18	L1
33	May 9	Dodgers	2–1	**Slegers** (2–0)	Bauer (3–2)	**Iglesias** (5)	15,294	15–18	W1
34	May 10	@ Astros	5–4	**Suárez** (1–0)	Bielak (1–2)	**Iglesias** (6)	13,695	16–18	W2
35	May 11	@ Astros	1–5	McCullers Jr. (3–1)	**Slegers** (2–1)	—	17,350	16–19	L1
36	May 12	@ Astros	1–9	Bielak (2–2)	**Heaney** (1–3)	—	13,668	16–20	L2
37	May 14	@ Red Sox	3–4	Andriese (2–2)	**Watson** (1–1)	Barnes (9)	9,284	16–21	L3
38	May 15	@ Red Sox	0–9	Pérez (1–2)	**Bundy** (0–5)	—	9,374	16–22	L4
39	May 16	@ Red Sox	6–5	**Iglesias** (2–2)	Barnes (1–1)	**Mayers** (2)	9,316	17–22	W1
40	May 17	Indians	7–4	**Watson** (2–1)	Hentges (1–1)	**Iglesias** (7)	9,527	18–22	W2
41	May 18	Indians	5–6	Plesac (4–3)	**Claudio** (0–1)	Karinchak (4)	9,491	18–23	L1
42	May 19	Indians	2–3	Civale (6–1)	**Watson** (2–2)	Karinchak (5)	10,378	18–24	L2
43	May 20 (1)	Twins	7–1 (7)	**Cobb** (2–2)	Thorpe (0–2)	—	9,920	19–24	W1
44	May 20 (2)	Twins	3–6 (7)	Berríos (4–2)	**Canning** (3–3)	Robles (2)	9,820	19–25	L1
45	May 21	Athletics	4–8	Petit (6–0)	**Mayers** (1–3)	—	14,624	19–26	L2
46	May 22	Athletics	2–6	Bassitt (4–2)	**Sandoval** (0–1)	—	15,151	19–27	L3
47	May 23	Athletics	6–5	**Iglesias** (3–2)	Guerra (1–1)	—	15,154	20–27	W1
48	May 25	Rangers	11–5	**Heaney** (2–3)	Yang (0–2)	—	10,987	21–27	W2
49	May 26	Rangers	9–8	**Canning** (4–3)	Dunning (2–4)	**Iglesias** (8)	8,547	22–27	W3
50	May 27	@ Athletics	0–5	Bassitt (5–2)	**Slegers** (2–2)	—	5,487	22–28	L1
51	May 28	@ Athletics	1–3	Petit (7–0)	**Ohtani** (1–1)	Trivino (7)	8,757	22–29	L2
52	May 29	@ Athletics	4–0	**Cobb** (3–2)	Montas (5–5)	—	9,433	23–29	W1
53	May 30	@ Athletics	4–2	**Suárez** (2–0)	Irvin (3–7)	**Iglesias** (9)	10,029	24–29	W2
54	May 31	@ Giants	1–6	Cueto (4–1)	**Bundy** (0–6)	—	13,144	24–30	L1

June: 15–11 (Home: 8–5; Away: 7–6)

#	Date	Opponent	Score	Win	Loss	Save	Attendance	Record	Streak
55	June 1	@ Giants	8–1	**Heaney** (3–3)	Wood (5–3)	—	10,546	25–30	W1
56	June 3	Mariners	2–6	Sheffield (5–4)	**Canning** (4–4)	—	9,714	25–31	L1
57	June 4	Mariners	3–2	**Ohtani** (2–1)	Santiago (0–1)	**Iglesias** (10)	15,141	26–31	W1
58	June 5	Mariners	12–5	**Cobb** (4–2)	Steckenrider (2–2)	—	15,071	27–31	W2
59	June 6	Mariners	5–9	Gilbert (1–2)	**Sandoval** (0–2)	—	12,833	27–32	L1
60	June 7	Royals	8–3	**Bundy** (1–6)	Kowar (0–1)	—	9,481	28–32	W1
61	June 8	Royals	8–1	**Heaney** (4–3)	Bubic (1–1)	—	9,387	29–32	W2
62	June 9	Royals	6–1	**Canning** (5–4)	Keller (6–5)	—	10,474	30–32	W3
63	June 11	@ Diamondbacks	6–5 (10)	**Iglesias** (4–2)	Smith (1–4)	**Claudio** (1)	18,458	31–32	W4
64	June 12	@ Diamondbacks	8–7	**Claudio** (1–1)	Soria (0–3)	**Iglesias** (11)	13,863	32–32	W5
65	June 13	@ Diamondbacks	10–3	**Sandoval** (1–2)	Duplantier (0–3)	—	12,768	33–32	W6
66	June 14	@ Athletics	5–8	Manaea (6–2)	**Bundy** (1–7)	Trivino (11)	4,102	33–33	L1
67	June 15	@ Athletics	4–6	Montas (7–6)	**Heaney** (4–4)	Petit (2)	4,942	33–34	L2
68	June 16	@ Athletics	4–8	Smith (1–0)	**Watson** (2–3)	—	6,228	33–35	L3
69	June 17	Tigers	7–5	**Ohtani** (3–1)	Manning (0–1)	**Iglesias** (12)	30,709	34–35	W1
70	June 18	Tigers	11–3	**Cobb** (5–2)	Ureña (2–7)	—	22,734	35–35	W2
71	June 19	Tigers	8–3	**Sandoval** (2–2)	Peralta (0–1)	—	23,175	36–35	W3
72	June 20	Tigers	3–5 (10)	Cisnero (1–4)	**Iglesias** (4–3)	Fulmer (6)	21,626	36–36	L1
73	June 22	Giants	0–5	DeSclafani (8–2)	**Heaney** (4–5)	—	28,354	36–37	L2
74	June 23	Giants	3–9 (13)	Leone (1–0)	**Claudio** (1–2)	—	20,620	36–38	L3
75	June 25	@ Rays	3–4	McHugh (2–1)	**Suárez** (2–1)	Castillo (12)	7,909	36–39	L4
76	June 26	@ Rays	3–13	McClanahan (3–2)	**Cobb** (5–3)	—	16,699	36–40	L5
77	June 27	@ Rays	6–4	**Watson** (3–3)	Wisler (1–3)	**Iglesias** (13)	12,764	37–40	W1
78	June 28	@ Yankees	5–3	**Suárez** (3–1)	King (0–4)	**Iglesias** (14)	25,540	38–40	W2
79	June 29	@ Yankees	5–11	Taillon (3–4)	**Heaney** (4–6)	—	23,152	38–41	L1
80	June 30	@ Yankees	11–8	**Mayers** (2–3)	Luetge (2–1)	**Iglesias** (15)	30,714	39–41	W1

July: 13–11 (Home: 9–6; Away: 4–5)

#	Date	Opponent	Score	Win	Loss	Save	Attendance	Record	Streak
—	July 1	@ Yankees	Postponed (Rain, Makeup August 16)						
81	July 2	Orioles	8–7	**Iglesias** (5–3)	Fry (2–3)	—	23,561	40–41	W2
82	July 3	Orioles	4–1	**Cobb** (6–3)	López (2–11)	**Iglesias** (16)	28,160	41–41	W3
83	July 4	Orioles	6–5	**Iglesias** (6–3)	Sulser (2–1)	—	18,955	42–41	W4
84	July 5	Red Sox	4–5	Pérez (7–4)	**Suárez** (3–2)	Ottavino (7)	38,201	42–42	L1
85	July 6	Red Sox	5–3	**Ohtani** (4–1)	Eovaldi (9–5)	**Iglesias** (17)	28,689	43–42	W1
86	July 7	Red Sox	5–4	**Heaney** (5–6)	Rodríguez (6–5)	**Iglesias** (18)	20,001	44–42	W2
87	July 9	@ Mariners	3–7	Steckenrider (3–2)	**Mayers** (2–4)	—	20,381	44–43	L1
88	July 10	@ Mariners	0–2	Flexen (8–3)	**Sandoval** (2–3)	Sewald (2)	27,353	44–44	L2
89	July 11	@ Mariners	7–1	**Suárez** (4–2)	Ramírez (0–1)	**Iglesias** (19)	23,348	45–44	W1
ASG	July 13	AL @ NL	5–2	Ohtani (1–0)	Burnes (0–1)	Hendriks (1)	49,814	45–44	N/A
90	July 16	Mariners	5–6	Flexen (9–3)	**Heaney** (5–7)	Sewald (3)	40,880	45–45	L1
91	July 17	Mariners	9–4	**Cobb** (7–3)	Kikuchi (6–5)	—	28,927	46–45	W1
92	July 18	Mariners	4–7	Gilbert (4–2)	**Sandoval** (2–4)	—	23,434	46–46	L1
93	July 19	@ Athletics	1–4	Irvin (7–8)	**Cishek** (0–1)	Trivino (15)	14,856	46–47	L2
94	July 20	@ Athletics	0–6	Kaprielian (5–3)	**Suárez** (4–3)	—	9,154	46–48	L3
95	July 22	@ Twins	3–2	**Heaney** (6–7)	Maeda (4–4)	**Iglesias** (20)	23,337	47–48	W1
96	July 23	@ Twins	4–5	Minaya (1–0)	**Iglesias** (6–4)	Rogers (9)	21,384	47–49	L1
97	July 24	@ Twins	2–1	**Sandoval** (3–4)	Berríos (7–5)	**Iglesias** (21)	22,240	48–49	W1
98	July 25	@ Twins	6–2	**Barría** (1–0)	Coulombe (1–1)	—	23,158	49–49	W2
99	July 26	Rockies	6–2	**Ohtani** (5–1)	Márquez (8–8)	—	22,751	50–49	W3
100	July 27	Rockies	3–12	Gomber (8–5)	**Suárez** (4–4)	—	16,115	50–50	L1
101	July 28	Rockies	8–7	**Iglesias** (7–4)	Estévez (2–3)	—	16,365	51–50	W1
102	July 29	Athletics	0–4	Montas (9–8)	**Bundy** (1–8)	—	18,631	51–51	L1
103	July 30	Athletics	0–2	Bassitt (11–3)	**Sandoval** (3–5)	Trivino (17)	28,861	51–52	L2
104	July 31	Athletics	1–0	**Barría** (2–0)	Irvin (7–10)	**Iglesias** (22)	23,207	52–52	W1

August: 14–15 (Home: 5–6; Away: 9–9)

#	Date	Opponent	Score	Win	Loss	Save	Attendance	Record	Streak
105	August 1	Athletics	3–8	Jefferies (1–0)	**Detmers** (0–1)	—	21,597	52–53	L1
106	August 2	@ Rangers	1–4	Dunning (5–7)	**Rodriguez** (2–1)	Patton (1)	20,533	52–54	L2
107	August 3	@ Rangers	11–3	**Suárez** (5–4)	Lyles (5–8)	—	19,074	53–54	W1
108	August 4	@ Rangers	2–1	**Ohtani** (6–1)	Allard (2–10)	**Iglesias** (23)	27,360	54–54	W2
109	August 5	@ Rangers	5–0	**Bundy** (2–8)	Howard (0–3)	—	21,670	55–54	W3
110	August 6	@ Dodgers	4–3 (10)	**Warren** (1–0)	Cleavinger (2–4)	**Iglesias** (24)	50,822	56–54	W4
111	August 7	@ Dodgers	3–5	Graterol (2–0)	**Guerra** (2–2)	Jansen (23)	50,808	56–55	L1
112	August 8	@ Dodgers	2–8	Buehler (12–2)	**Detmers** (0–2)	—	46,982	56–56	L2
113	August 10 (1)	@ Blue Jays	6–3 (7)	**Guerra** (3–2)	Matz (9–7)	**Iglesias** (25)	3,656	57–56	W1
114	August 10 (2)	Blue Jays	0–4 (7)	Richards (5–1)	**Suárez** (5–5)	—	14,443	57–57	L1
115	August 11	Blue Jays	2–10	Manoah (5–1)	**Bundy** (2–9)	—	22,620	57–58	L2
116	August 12	Blue Jays	6–3	**Ohtani** (7–1)	Berríos (8–6)	—	19,590	58–58	W1
117	August 13	Astros	1–4	Greinke (11–3)	**Sandoval** (3–6)	Pressly (19)	23,981	58–59	L1
118	August 14	Astros	2–8	García (9–6)	**Barría** (2–1)	—	27,121	58–60	L2
119	August 15	Astros	3–1	**Detmers** (1–2)	McCullers Jr. (9–4)	**Iglesias** (26)	19,281	59–60	W1
120	August 16	@ Yankees	1–2	Cole (11–6)	**Suárez** (5–6)	Green (4)	37,010	59–61	L1
121	August 17	@ Tigers	8–2	**Mayers** (3–4)	Soto (4–3)	—	24,714	60–61	W1
122	August 18	@ Tigers	3–1	**Ohtani** (8–1)	Skubal (8–11)	**Iglesias** (27)	27,284	61–61	W2
123	August 19	@ Tigers	13–10	**Mayers** (4–4)	Fulmer (5–5)	**Warren** (1)	20,847	62–61	W3
124	August 20	@ Indians	1–9	Stephan (2–0)	**Barría** (2–2)	—	22,755	62–62	L1
125	August 21	@ Indians	1–5	McKenzie (3–5)	**Detmers** (1–3)	—	31,406	62–63	L2
126	August 22	@ Indians	0–3	Quantrill (4–2)	**Suárez** (5–7)	Clase (18)	1,832	62–64	L3
127	August 24	@ Orioles	14–8	**Guerra** (1–0)	Watkins (2–6)	—	8,781	63–64	W1
128	August 25	@ Orioles	6–10	Scott (5–4)	**Petricka** (0–1)	—	15,867	63–65	L1
129	August 26	@ Orioles	1–13	Akin (1–8)	**Peguero** (0–1)	—	10,211	63–66	L2
130	August 27	Padres	0–5	Musgrove (9–8)	**Criswell** (0–1)	—	25,376	63–67	L3
131	August 28	Padres	10–2	**Wantz** (1–0)	Weathers (4–7)	—	36,176	64–67	W1
132	August 30	Yankees	8–7	**Guerra** (5–2)	Peralta (4–3)	**Iglesias** (28)	29,436	65–67	W2
133	August 31	Yankees	6–4	**Herget** (1–1)	Taillon (8–5)	**Iglesias** (29)	34,813	66–67	W3

September: 9–17 (Home: 4–11; Away: 5–6)

#	Date	Opponent	Score	Win	Loss	Save	Attendance	Record	Streak
134	September 1	Yankees	1–4	Cole (14–6)	**Naughton** (0–1)	Chapman (25)	28,753	66–68	L1
135	September 3	Rangers	3–2	**Ohtani** (9–1)	Santana (2–4)	**Iglesias** (30)	19,074	67–68	W1
136	September 4	Rangers	4–1	**Suárez** (6–7)	Allard (3–12)	—	22,697	68–68	W2
137	September 5	Rangers	3–7	Hearn (5–4)	**Junk** (0–1)	—	18,492	68–69	L1
138	September 6	Rangers	0–4	Alexy (2–0)	**Barría** (2–3)	—	16,241	68–70	L2
139	September 7	@ Padres	4–0	**Herget** (2–1)	Snell (7–6)	—	34,405	69–70	W1
140	September 8	@ Padres	5–8	Darvish (8–9)	**Mayers** (4–5)	Melancon (37)	34,537	69–71	L1
141	September 10	@ Astros	5–10	Valdez (10–5)	**Ohtani** (9–2)	—	28,740	69–72	L2
142	September 11	@ Astros	4–2	**Suárez** (7–7)	García (10–7)	**Iglesias** (31)	31,547	70–72	W1
143	September 12	@ Astros	1–3	McCullers Jr. (12–4)	**Quijada** (0–1)	Pressly (24)	28,763	70–73	L1
144	September 14	@ White Sox	3–9	Bummer (3–5)	**Naughton** (0–2)	—	21,848	70–74	L2
145	September 15	@ White Sox	3–2	**Mayers** (5–5)	Kopech (4–3)	**Iglesias** (32)	26,505	71–74	W1
146	September 16	@ White Sox	9–3	**Cobb** (8–3)	López (3–3)	—	27,098	72–74	W2
147	September 17	Athletics	4–5	Irvin (10–13)	**Marte** (0–1)	Romo (3)	18,918	72–75	L1
148	September 18	Athletics	1–3	Kaprielian (8–5)	**Suárez** (7–8)	Chafin (5)	27,150	72–76	L2
149	September 19	Athletics	2–3 (10)	Trivino (6–7)	**Iglesias** (7–5)	—	22,456	72–77	L3
150	September 20	Astros	0–10	Valdez (11–5)	**Barría** (2–4)	—	16,070	72–78	L4
151	September 21	Astros	5–10	Urquidy (8–3)	**Naughton** (0–3)	—	18,332	72–79	L5
152	September 22	Astros	5–9 (12)	García (4–9)	**Selman** (0–1)	—	14,863	72–80	L6
153	September 23	Astros	3–2	**Warren** (2–0)	McCullers Jr. (12–5)	**Iglesias** (33)	19,829	73–80	W1
154	September 24	Mariners	5–6	Smith (4–4)	**Herget** (2–2)	Sewald (11)	18,551	73–81	L1
155	September 25	Mariners	14–1	**Díaz** (1–0)	Anderson (7–10)	—	30,221	74–81	W1
156	September 26	Mariners	1–5	Gonzales (10–5)	**Quijada** (0–2)	—	22,057	74–82	L1
157	September 28	@ Rangers	2–5	Alexy (3–1)	**Naughton** (0–4)	Barlow (10)	20,066	74–83	L2
158	September 29	@ Rangers	7–2	**Quijada** (1–2)	Hearn (6–6)	—	23,241	75–83	W1
159	September 30	@ Rangers	6–7	Patton (2–2)	**Herget** (2–3)	Barlow (11)	19,960	75–84	L1

October: 2–1 (Home: 0–0; Away: 2–1)

#	Date	Opponent	Score	Win	Loss	Save	Attendance	Record	Streak
160	October 1	@ Mariners	2–1	**Suárez** (8–8)	Gonzales (10–6)	**Iglesias** (34)	44,169	76–84	W1
161	October 2	@ Mariners	4–6	Sewald (10–3)	**Cishek** (0–2)	Steckenrider (14)	44,414	76–85	L1
162	October 3	@ Mariners	7–3	**Ortega** (1–0)	Anderson (7–11)	—	44,229	77–85	W1

Legend: = Win = Loss = Postponement
Bold = Angels team member

== Roster ==
2021 Los Angeles Angels
Roster
Pitchers: 51 Jaime Barría; 37 Dylan Bundy; 47 Griffin Canning; 40 Steve Cishek; 58 Alex Claudio; 38 Alex Cobb; 56 Cooper Criswell; 84 Reid Detmers; 74 Jhonathan Díaz; 41 Junior Guerra; 28 Andrew Heaney; 46 Jimmy Herget; 49 James Hoyt; 32 Raisel Iglesias; 66 Janson Junk; 68 José Marte; 21 Mike Mayers; 58 Packy Naughton; 17 Shohei Ohtani; 62 Oliver Ortega; 59 Elvis Peguero; 64 Félix Peña; 52 Jake Petricka; 65 José Quijada; 62 José Quintana; 56 Noé Ramirez; 44 A. J. Ramos; 73 Chris Rodriguez; 71 Ben Rowen; 43 Patrick Sandoval; 67 Sam Selman; 57 Aaron Slegers; 60 Hunter Strickland; 54 José Suárez; 63 Kyle Tyler; 60 Andrew Wantz; 61 Austin Warren; 35 Tony Watson	Catchers: 12 Anthony Bemboom; 16 Drew Butera; 59 Jack Kruger; 33 Max Stassi; 24 Kurt Suzuki; Infielders: 22 David Fletcher; 13 Phil Gosselin; 4 José Iglesias; 9,59 Jack Mayfield; 5 Albert Pujols; 6 Anthony Rendon; 2 Luis Rengifo; 23 Matt Thaiss; 20 Jared Walsh; 8 Kean Wong	Outfielders: 7 Jo Adell; 9 Adam Eaton; 25 Dexter Fowler; 9 Jon Jay; 19 Juan Lagares; 16 Brandon Marsh; 18 José Rojas; 44 Scott Schebler; 27 Mike Trout; 10 Justin Upton; 3 Taylor Ward	Manager: 70 Joe Maddon; Coaches: 83 Matt Wise (pitching); 55 Brian Butterfield (third base); 92 Manny Del Campo (bullpen catcher); 99 Bruce Hines (first base); 86 Mike Gallego (bench); 93 Jason Brown (bullpen catcher); 88 John Mallee (assistant hitting); 85 Ryan Garko (coaching assistant); 28 José Molina (catching); 77 Jeremy Reed (hitting); 87 Paul Sorrento (hitting instructor); 84 Dom Chiti (bullpen); 90 Tim Buss (quality assurance); 91 Mike Ashman (batting practice pitcher); 94 Ali Modami (staff assistant)

== Farm system ==
Level	Team	League	Manager
AAA	Salt Lake Bees	Triple-A West	Lou Marson
AA	Rocket City Trash Pandas	Double-A South	Jay Bell
A	Tri-City Dust Devils	High-A West	Andy Schatzley
A-Advanced	Inland Empire 66ers	Low-A West	Jack Howell
Rookie	ACL Angels	Arizona Complex League	Dave Stapleton
Rookie	DSL Angels	Dominican Summer League	Héctor de la Cruz

All coaches and rosters can be found on each team's website.

=== Major League Baseball draft ===
Below are the Angels' picks from 2021 Major League Baseball draft. Players who reached MLB are in bold.

Los Angeles Angels 2021 Draft Picks

Round	Pick	Name	Age	Position	School	Signing bonus
1	9	**Sam Bachman**	21	Pitcher	Miami University	$3,847,500
2	45	**Ky Bush**	21	Pitcher	Saint Mary's College of California	$1,747,500
3	80	Landon Marceaux	21	Pitcher	Louisiana State University	$765,300
4	110	**Luke Murphy**	21	Pitcher	Vanderbilt University	$747,500
5	141	**Brett Kerry**	22	Pitcher	University of South Carolina	$297,500
6	171	Jake Smith	21	Pitcher	University of Miami	$247,500
7	201	Ryan Costeiu	20	Pitcher	University of Arkansas	$222,500
8	231	Nick Jones	22	Pitcher	Georgia Southern University	$122,500
9	261	Braden Olthoff	22	Pitcher	Tulane University	$122,500
10	291	Andrew Peters	22	Pitcher	University of South Carolina	$144,700
11	321	**Chase Silseth**	21	Pitcher	University of Arizona	$485,000
12	351	Mason Albright	18	Pitcher	IMG Academy (FL)	$1,247,500
13	381	Mo Hanley	21	Pitcher	Adrian College	$125,000
14	411	Eric Torres	21	Pitcher	Kansas State University	$125,000
15	441	Glenn Albanese	22	Pitcher	University of Louisville	$125,000
16	471	Brandon Dufault	22	Pitcher	Northeastern University	$125,000
17	501	Mason Erla	23	Pitcher	Michigan State University	$125,000
18	531	Nick Mondak	23	Pitcher	St. John's University	$50,000
19	561	Nathan Burns	22	Pitcher	Oregon State University	$50,000
20	591	Marcelo Perez	21	Pitcher	Texas Christian University	Not signed

== See also ==
- Los Angeles Angels
- Angel Stadium

Records
Preceded by 2020	Los Angeles Angels seasons 2021	Succeeded by 2022
