= Brian Brady (baseball) =

American baseball player (born 1962)

- Outfielder
- Born: July 11, 1962 (age 63); Elmhurst, New York, U.S.
- Batted: Left Threw: Left

MLB debut
- April 16, 1989, for the California Angels

Last MLB appearance
- April 22, 1989, for the California Angels

MLB statistics
- Batting average: .500
- Home runs: 0
- Runs batted in: 1
- Stats at Baseball Reference

Teams
- California Angels (1989)

Brian Phelan Brady (born July 11, 1962) is an American former professional baseball right fielder who played briefly for the California Angels of Major League Baseball (MLB) during the 1989 season. Listed at 5' 11", 185 lb., Brady batted and threw left-handed. A native of Elmhurst, New York, he attended New York Institute of Technology.

== Career ==
Brady was selected by the California Angels in the 6th round of the 1984 MLB draft. He spent six years in the Angels minor league system, playing for Salem (1984), Redwood (1985), Midland (1986–87) and Edmonton (1988), before joining the Angels in April 1989.

In two games for the Angels, Brady hit 1-for-2 (a double) with one run batted in for a .500 batting average. He was returned to Edmonton for the rest of the 1989 season. After that, he played for the 1990 Phoenix Firebirds of the Pacific Coast League. In seven minor league seasons, he hit .269 with 49 home runs, 312 RBI, and a .341 on-base percentage in 670 games.

== See also ==
- 1989 California Angels season
- Los Angeles Angels of Anaheim all-time roster
