= Pete Coachman =

American baseball player (born 1961)

- Third baseman
- Born: November 11, 1961 (age 64); Cottonwood, Alabama, U.S.
- Batted: Right Threw: Right

MLB debut
- August 18, 1990, for the California Angels

Last MLB appearance
- October 3, 1990, for the California Angels

MLB statistics
- Batting average: .311
- Runs batted in: 5
- Hits: 14
- Stats at Baseball Reference

Teams
- California Angels (1990)

Bobby Dean Coachman (born November 11, 1961) is an American former professional baseball player who played part of one season for the California Angels of Major League Baseball (MLB). He was drafted in the 11th round of the 1984 MLB draft out of the University of South Alabama.
