= Jeff Richardson (pitcher) =

American baseball player (born 1963)

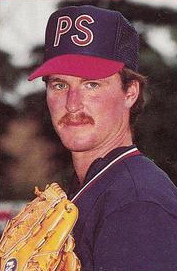
- Richardson in 1988
- Pitcher
- Born: August 29, 1963 (age 62); Wichita, Kansas, U.S.
- Batted: Right Threw: Right

MLB debut
- September 19, 1990, for the California Angels

Last MLB appearance
- September 19, 1990, for the California Angels

MLB statistics
- Games: 1
- Earned run average: 0.00
- Strikeouts: 0
- Stats at Baseball Reference

Teams
- California Angels (1990)

Jeffrey Scott Richardson (born August 29, 1963) is an American former professional baseball pitcher. Richardson played for the California Angels of the Major League Baseball (MLB) in 1990. He batted and threw right-handed.
