= Chris Rodriguez (pitcher) =

American baseball player (born 1998)

Free agent
- Pitcher
- Born: July 20, 1998 (age 28); Coral Springs, Florida, U.S.
- Bats: Right Throws: Right

MLB debut
- April 2, 2021, for the Los Angeles Angels

MLB statistics (through 2021 season)
- Win–loss record: 2–1
- Earned run average: 3.64
- Strikeouts: 29
- Stats at Baseball Reference

Teams
- Los Angeles Angels (2021)

Christopher Joseph Rodriguez (born July 20, 1998) is an American professional baseball pitcher who is a free agent. He has previously played in Major League Baseball (MLB) for the Los Angeles Angels.

== Career ==
Rodriguez attended Monsignor Edward Pace High School in Miami Gardens, Florida.

=== Los Angeles Angels ===
==== Minor leagues ====
Rodriguez was drafted by the Los Angeles Angels in the fourth round of the 2016 Major League Baseball draft. He made his professional debut with the rookie–level Arizona League Angels, recording a 1.59 ERA with 17 strikeouts across 11 1/3 innings pitched.

In 2017, Rodriguez split the season between the rookie–level Orem Owlz and Single–A Burlington Bees. In 14 total starts, he registered a 5–3 record and 6.16 ERA with 56 strikeouts in 57.0 innings of work. Rodriguez missed all of the 2018 season and most of the 2019 season due to a back injury. He did not play in a game in 2020 due to the cancellation of the minor league season because of the COVID-19 pandemic.

==== Major leagues ====
On November 20, 2020, the Angels added Rodriguez to their 40-man roster to protect him from the Rule 5 draft. On April 2, 2021, Rodriguez made his MLB debut in relief against the Chicago White Sox, pitching two innings with three strikeouts. On May 6, he was placed on the 10-day injured list after experiencing shoulder inflammation. On June 4, Rodriguez was activated from the injured list and made his return 3 days later in relief against the Kansas City Royals. He was sent down to double-A Rocket City on June 21 after putting up a 9.00 ERA since returning from his shoulder injury. On August 2, 2021, Rodriguez was called back up to the major league roster, making his first career start against the Texas Rangers. He pitched 6 innings, allowing 3 runs and striking out 7 batters. Rodriguez would later be optioned back and forth from the major league roster several times until August 14, 2021, when he was placed on the 7-day injured list while with the Triple-A Salt Lake Bees due to a lat strain, eventually shutting him down for the rest of the season. In 15 appearances, he posted a 2–1 record with a 3.65 ERA and 29 strikeouts. On November 8, 2021, it was announced that Rodriguez was expected to miss most of, if not all of the 2022 season after undergoing right capsule surgery.

Rodriguez was placed on the 60-day injured list to begin the 2022 season, and was shut down in August without seeing game action on the year.

In spring training in 2023, Rodriguez faced live hitters for the first time since his surgery, but nonetheless began the season on the injured list. However, two weeks later he suffered a setback after experiencing renewed soreness in his right shoulder, and was transferred to the 60–day injured list on April 15, 2023. On September 11, Rodriguez returned and began a rehab assignment with the Single–A Inland Empire 66ers. In three games split between Inland Empire and Triple–A Salt Lake, he struggled to a 13.50 ERA with two strikeouts in 2 2/3 innings of work. However, on September 29, manager Phil Nevin announced that Rodriguez had suffered another setback in his right shoulder.

=== Arizona Diamondbacks ===
On October 30, 2023, Rodriguez was claimed off waivers by the Arizona Diamondbacks. On November 14, he was removed from the 40–man roster and sent outright to the Triple–A Reno Aces. Rodriguez split the 2024 season between the rookie-level Arizona Complex League Diamondbacks, Double-A Amarillo Sod Poodles, and Triple-A Reno. In 36 appearances split between the three affiliates, he accumulated a 3–2 record and 4.84 ERA with 42 strikeouts across 48 1/3 innings pitched. Rodriguez elected free agency following the season on November 4, 2024.

=== Chicago White Sox ===
On January 21, 2025, Rodriguez signed a minor league contract with the Chicago White Sox. He made 18 appearances (eight starts) for the Triple-A Charlotte Knights, compiling a 1–3 record and 5.71 ERA with 35 strikeouts over 41 innings of work. Rodriguez elected free agency following the season on November 6.
