= Tony Watson =

American baseball player (born 1985)

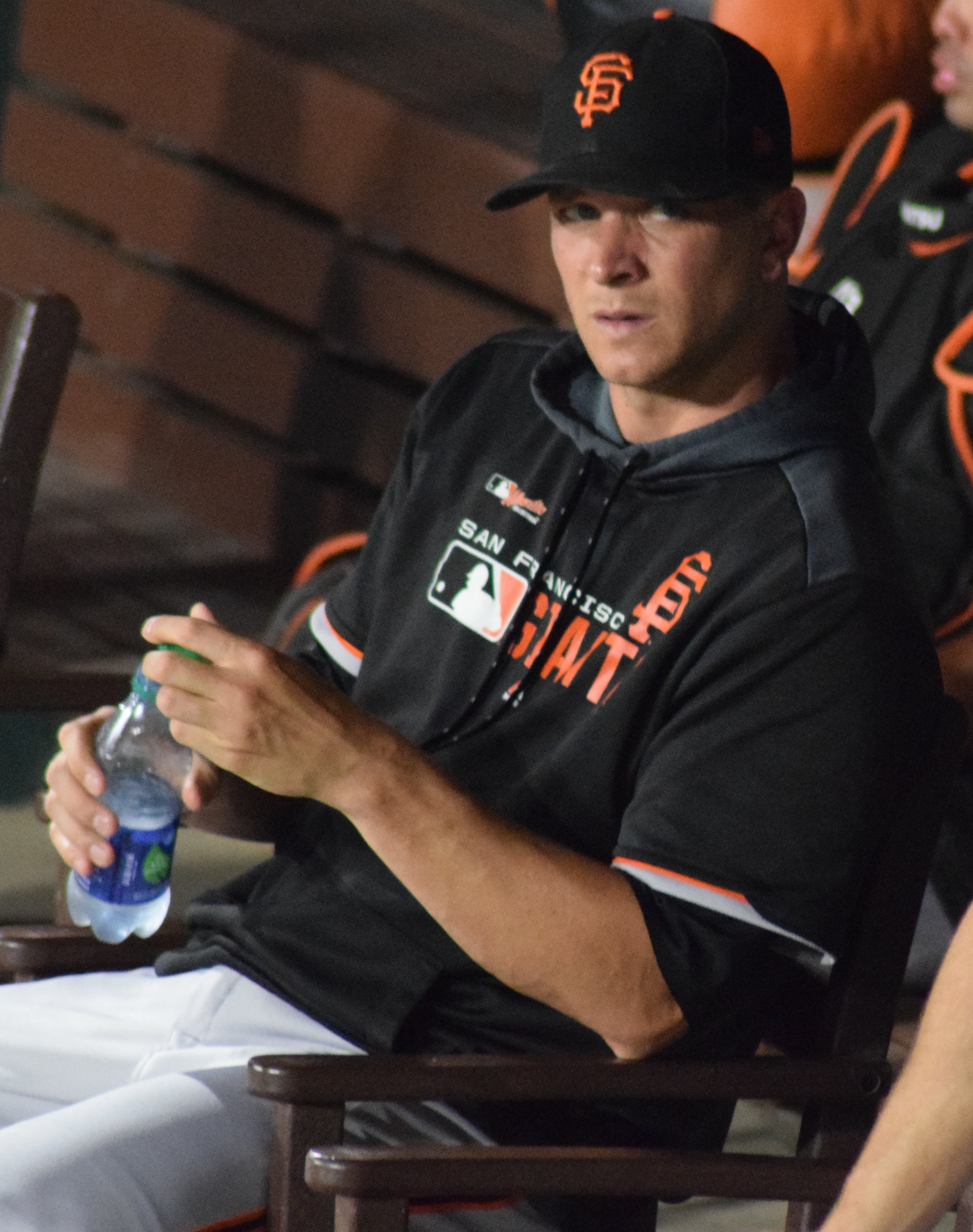
- Watson with the San Francisco Giants in 2019
- Pitcher
- Born: May 30, 1985 (age 41); Sioux City, Iowa, U.S.
- Batted: Left Threw: Left

MLB debut
- June 8, 2011, for the Pittsburgh Pirates

Last MLB appearance
- September 28, 2021, for the San Francisco Giants

MLB statistics
- Win–loss record: 47–29
- Earned run average: 2.90
- Strikeouts: 570
- Stats at Baseball Reference

Teams
- Pittsburgh Pirates (2011–2017); Los Angeles Dodgers (2017); San Francisco Giants (2018–2020); Los Angeles Angels (2021); San Francisco Giants (2021)

Career highlights and awards
- All-Star (2014)

Anthony Michael Watson (born May 30, 1985) is an American former professional baseball pitcher. He played in Major League Baseball (MLB) for the Pittsburgh Pirates, Los Angeles Dodgers, San Francisco Giants and Los Angeles Angels. Watson attended the University of Nebraska–Lincoln, and played college baseball for the Nebraska Cornhuskers. Watson was drafted by the Pirates in the ninth round of the 2007 Major League Baseball draft. He made his MLB debut in 2011, was an MLB All-Star in 2014, and is the all time MLB leader in holds.

== Early career ==
Watson attended Dallas Center-Grimes High School in Grimes, Iowa. In 2003, his senior year, Watson threw three no-hitters and had a 0.10 earned run average (ERA). He won the Bob Feller Award as the top high school pitcher in Iowa.

The Florida Marlins selected him in the 23rd round of the 2003 Major League Baseball draft, but he chose to attend the University of Nebraska–Lincoln, where he played college baseball for the Nebraska Cornhuskers. In 2005, he had a 6–1 win–loss record and a 2.82 ERA in 23 games (five starts) and in 2006 he went 10–2 with a 2.78 ERA in 17 games (15 starts). Watson was drafted in the 17th round of the 2006 Major League Baseball draft by the Baltimore Orioles, but chose not to sign. After the 2006 season, he played collegiate summer baseball with the Harwich Mariners of the Cape Cod Baseball League and was named a league all-star. In 2007, he went 6–4 with a 4.09 ERA in 15 starts.

== Professional career ==
=== Pittsburgh Pirates ===
Watson was drafted by the Pittsburgh Pirates in the ninth round of the 2007 Major League Baseball draft, and signed for an $85,000 signing bonus. He split 2007 between the State College Spikes and Hickory Crawdads, going a combined 7–2 with a 2.79 ERA in 13 starts. In 2008, he went 8–12 with a 3.56 ERA in 28 starts for the Lynchburg Hillcats and in 2009 he went 0–3 with an 8.22 ERA in five starts for the Altoona Curve. He went 6–4 with a 2.67 ERA in 34 games (nine starts) with the Curve in 2010.

On June 7, 2011, Watson was called up to the majors for the first time. José Ascanio was designated for assignment to make room for Watson on the Pirates' 25-man roster. Watson made his major league debut on June 8, 2011, striking out both batters he faced, Chris Young and Juan Miranda of the Arizona Diamondbacks. Watson went 2–2 with a 3.95 ERA in 43 games in 2011.

In 2012, Watson went 5–2 with a 3.38 ERA in 68 games. In 2013, Watson went 3–1 with a 2.39 ERA in 67 games with two saves. In 2014, Watson went 10–2 with a career-best 1.63 ERA in 78 games with two saves. On May 26, 2014, Watson got his first career big league hit, a single off of Carlos Torres of the New York Mets. During the 2014 season, Watson earned his first MLB All Star Game selection. He retired the only batter he faced during the game. Watson ended the 2014 season with a 10-2 record and a 1.63 ERA in 78 games.

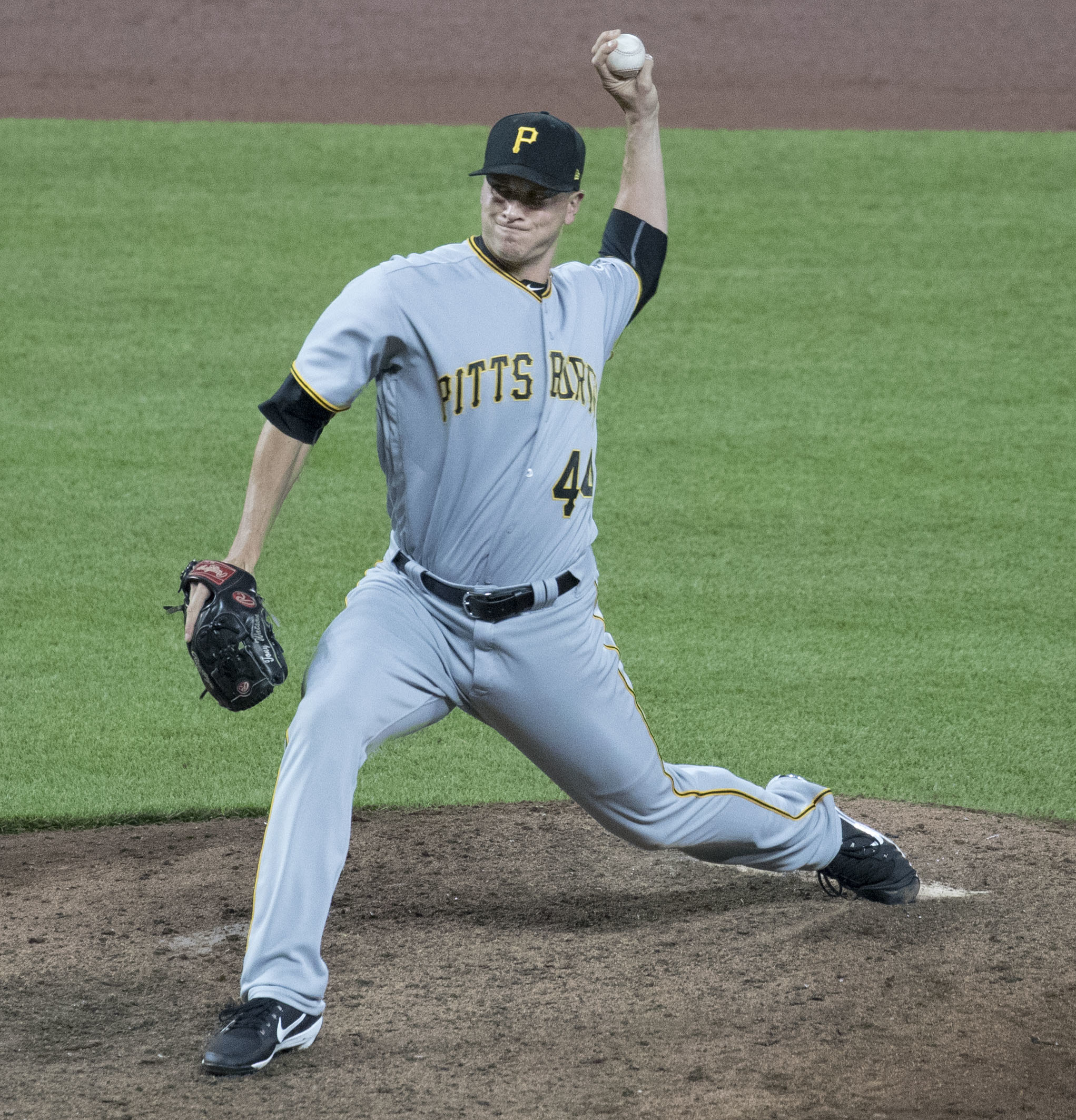
Watson with the Pirates in 2017

In 2015, Watson went 4–1 with a 1.91 ERA in 77 games with one save and a major-league-leading 41 holds. At the 2016 trade deadline, the Pirates traded Mark Melancon to the Nationals, Watson moved then from a setup role to the closer role. At the end of the season, Watson finished with 15 saves in 70 games.

At the beginning of the 2017 season, Watson began as closer but after a string of consecutive blown saves, Watson was moved back to a setup role.

=== Los Angeles Dodgers ===
On July 31, 2017, the Pirates traded Watson to the Los Angeles Dodgers for minor leaguers Angel German and Oneil Cruz. In 24 appearances for the Dodgers he was 2–1 with a 2.70 ERA. In the post-season, he pitched in all three rounds of the playoffs, and was the winning pitcher in two games of the 2017 World Series.

=== San Francisco Giants ===
On February 19, 2018, Watson signed a two-year contract with the San Francisco Giants that included a player option for a third year. In 2018 he was 4-6 with a 2.59 ERA, as in 72 games he pitched 66 innings and struck out 72 batters.

In 2019, he was 2-2 with a 4.17 ERA, and in 60 games he pitched 54 innings. In the 2020 season, Watson pitched in 21 games, recording 2 saves with a 2.50 ERA.

=== Philadelphia Phillies ===
On February 17, 2021, Watson signed a minor league contract with the Philadelphia Phillies organization that included an invitation to Spring Training. On March 26, 2021, Watson opted out of his minor league contract and became a free agent.

=== Los Angeles Angels ===
On March 29, 2021, Watson signed a one-year, $1MM with the Los Angeles Angels. On June 5, Watson recorded a hold against the Seattle Mariners, and passed Arthur Rhodes to become the all-time leader in holds in MLB history with 232.

=== San Francisco Giants (second stint) ===
On July 30, 2021, Watson was traded to the San Francisco Giants in exchange for Sam Selman, Ivan Armstrong, and José Marte.

In the 2021 regular season with the Giants, Watson was 4-1 with a 2.96 ERA. In 26 relief appearances he pitched 24.1 innings in which he averaged 5.5 hits and 1.5 walks per 9 innings.

On April 18, 2022, Watson announced his retirement from professional baseball after 689 games across 11 years in Major League Baseball. He had a career 47-29 record and 2.90 ERA with 570 strikeouts. At the time of his retirement, he was also the all-time leader in holds with 246.

== Personal life ==
Watson's great-uncle, Tom Offenburger, served as an aide to Martin Luther King Jr. and the Southern Christian Leadership Conference.

Watson and his wife, Cassie, have two children; a daughter, Wynn, and son, Ted. The family lives in Florida during the offseason.
