= Sam Selman =

American baseball player (born 1990)

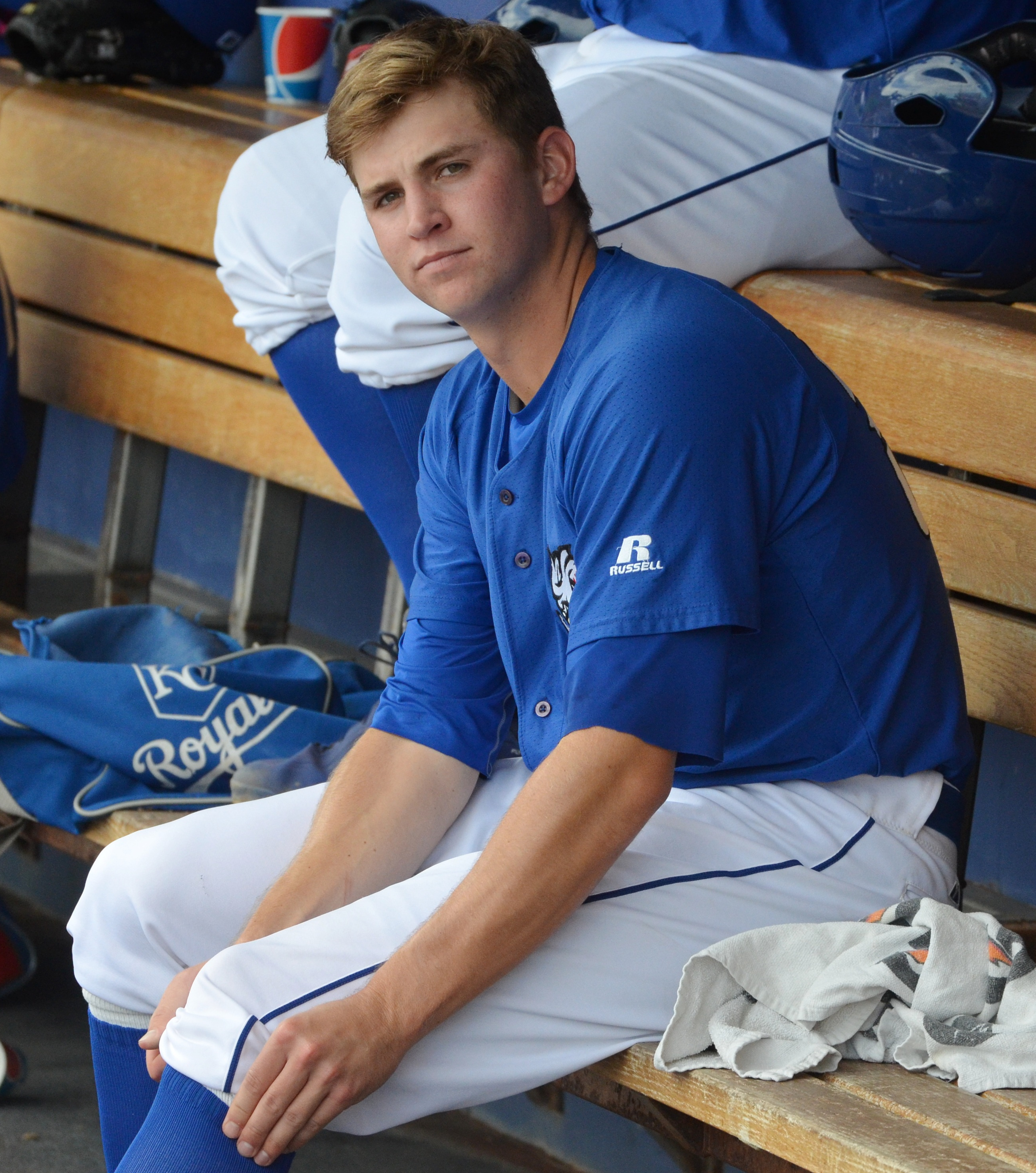
- Selman with the Omaha Storm Chasers in 2014
- Pitcher
- Born: November 14, 1990 (age 35); Austin, Texas, U.S.
- Batted: Right Threw: Left

MLB debut
- August 1, 2019, for the San Francisco Giants

Last MLB appearance
- October 2, 2022, for the Oakland Athletics

MLB statistics
- Win–loss record: 1–2
- Earned run average: 4.81
- Strikeouts: 70
- Stats at Baseball Reference

Teams
- San Francisco Giants (2019–2021); Los Angeles Angels (2021); Oakland Athletics (2022)

Samuel Ayres Selman (born November 14, 1990) is an American former professional baseball pitcher. He has previously played in Major League Baseball (MLB) for the San Francisco Giants, Los Angeles Angels, and Oakland Athletics. He played college baseball at Vanderbilt University. He was drafted by the Kansas City Royals in the second round of the 2012 MLB draft.

== Amateur career ==
Selman attended St. Andrew's Episcopal School in Austin, Texas. He was an ABCA/Rawlings All-American and two-time all-conference selection (2008 and 2009).

He was drafted by the Los Angeles Angels of Anaheim in the 14th round of the 2009 Major League Baseball draft, but did not sign and played college baseball at Vanderbilt University.

== Professional career ==
=== Kansas City Royals ===
He was drafted by the Kansas City Royals in the second round of the 2012 Major League Baseball draft, and signed for a signing bonus of $750,000.

Selman pitched in the Royals organization from 2012 through the 2018 season. During his time with them, he played for the AZL Royals, Idaho Falls Chukars, Wilmington Blue Rocks, Northwest Arkansas Naturals, and Omaha Storm Chasers Selman elected free agency on November 2, 2018.

=== San Francisco Giants ===
On March 22, 2019, Selman signed a minor league contract with the San Francisco Giants. On August 1, the Giants selected Selman's contract and promoted him to the major leagues. He made his major league debut that day versus the Philadelphia Phillies, pitching one inning in relief. With the Double–A Richmond Flying Squirrels and Triple–A Sacramento River Cats, Selman was a combined 3–2 with a 1.80 ERA in 43 games (one start) in which he pitched 55 innings and struck out 94 batters (striking out 15.4 batters per 9 innings). With the Giants, Selman recorded a 4.35 ERA in 10 relief appearances in which he pitched 10 1/3 innings and struck out 10 batters.

In his minor league career through 2019, in 531 1/3 career innings he averaged 11.3 strikeouts per nine innings. In 24 games for the Giants in 2020, Selman pitched to a 3.72 ERA with 23 strikeouts in 19 1/3 innings pitched.

=== Los Angeles Angels ===
On July 30, 2021, Selman was traded to the Los Angeles Angels along with José Marte and Ivan Armstrong in exchange for Tony Watson. In 18 appearances for the Angels, Selman struggled to a 6.35 ERA with 11 strikeouts in 17 innings pitched. On December 1, Selman was designated for assignment by the Angels. However, Selman remained in DFA limbo for over 3 months after the 2021-22 Major League Baseball lockout froze transactions until March 10, 2022.

=== Oakland Athletics ===
On March 13, 2022, Selman was claimed off waivers by the Oakland Athletics. On April 7, Selman was designated for assignment by the Athletics, and sent outright to the Triple-A Las Vegas Aviators on April 11. On April 18, Selman was added to the Athletics' roster as a COVID-19 substitute. Selman pitched 2 2/3 scoreless innings with five strikeouts against the Texas Rangers in his only appearance before being returned to Triple-A on April 23. The Athletics promoted Selman back to the major leagues on May 29. In 16 total appearances for Oakland, Selman registered a 4.91 ERA with 18 strikeouts across 18 1/3 innings pitched. On November 3, Selman was removed from the 40-man roster and sent outright to Triple–A. He elected free agency following the season on November 10.

=== High Point Rockers ===
On June 20, 2023, Selman signed with the High Point Rockers of the Atlantic League of Professional Baseball. In 29 appearances for the Rockers, he posted a 2.79 ERA with 38 strikeouts across 29 innings pitched. Selman became a free agent following the season.
