= José Marte =

Dominican baseball player (born 1996)

Free agent
- Pitcher
- Born: June 14, 1996 (age 30); Santiago de los Caballeros, Dominican Republic
- Bats: Right Throws: Right

MLB debut
- August 20, 2021, for the Los Angeles Angels

MLB statistics (through 2024 season)
- Win–loss record: 0–1
- Earned run average: 5.56
- Strikeouts: 41
- Stats at Baseball Reference

Teams
- Los Angeles Angels (2021–2024)

José Manuel Marte (born June 14, 1996) is a Dominican professional baseball pitcher who is a free agent. He has previously played in Major League Baseball (MLB) for the Los Angeles Angels.

== Career ==
=== San Francisco Giants ===
Marte signed up with the San Francisco Giants as an international free agent in July 2015. He made his professional debut with the Dominican Summer League Giants, posting a 1.89 ERA in 5 games. Marte split the 2016 season between the rookie-level AZL Giants and the Low-A Salem-Keizer Volcanoes, accumulating a 2–5 record and 5.24 ERA in 15 games (14 of them starts). The following year, Marte played for the Single-A Augusta GreenJackets, pitching to a 7–7 record and 4.70 ERA in 25 starts. In 2019, Marte played for the High-A San Jose Giants, recording a 3–9 record and 5.59 ERA with 80 strikeouts in 74.0 innings across 18 games. Marte did not play in a game in 2020 due to the cancellation of the minor league season because of the COVID-19 pandemic. In 2021, Marte began the year with the High-A Eugene Emeralds, and was promoted to the Double-A Richmond Flying Squirrels after 5 games. He logged a 3.57 ERA in 19 games for Richmond.

=== Los Angeles Angels ===
On July 30, 2021, the Giants traded Marte, Sam Selman, and Ivan Armstrong to the Los Angeles Angels in exchange for Tony Watson. He was assigned to the Double-A Rocket City Trash Pandas, where he made three scoreless appearances, and also struggled to an 8.59 ERA in 7 games for the Triple-A Salt Lake Bees.

The Angels called up Marte to the major leagues for the first time on August 20, 2021. He made his MLB debut that day, tossing 2 scoreless innings against the Cleveland Indians. Marte finished his rookie year with a 9.00 ERA in 4 big league appearances.

Marte split the 2022 season between the Angels and Salt Lake. He struggled to a 7.36 ERA with 15 strikeouts across 11 appearances for the Angels, while posting an improved 5.45 ERA with 46 strikeouts and 3 saves in 34 games for the Bees.

On March 20, 2023, Marte was shut down for four weeks after being diagnosed with a stress reaction is his right elbow. On August 22, he was activated from the injured list and subsequently optioned to Triple–A Salt Lake.

On December 4, 2023, Marte re–signed with the Angels on a minor league contract. In 20 games for Triple–A Salt Lake, he recorded a 2.61 ERA with 20 strikeouts and 5 saves across 20 2/3 innings pitched. On June 15, 2024, the Angels selected Marte's contract, adding him to their active roster. He appeared in 14 games for the Angels, logging a 2.33 ERA with 14 strikeouts over 19 1/3 innings pitched. Marte was placed on the 60–day injured list on August 30, ending his season after he experienced shoulder soreness while rehabbing from a viral infection. He was removed from the 40–man roster and sent outright to Triple–A Salt Lake on October 24. Marte elected free agency on November 4.

=== New York Mets ===
On April 1, 2025, Marte signed a two-year minor league contract with the New York Mets. On June 19, 2026, after two appearances he was placed on the full-season injured list ending his season. He elected free agency on November 2.
