= Brett Kerry =

American baseball player (born 1999)

Los Angeles Angels – No. 71
- Pitcher
- Born: April 12, 1999 (age 27); Clemmons, North Carolina, U.S.
- Bats: Right Throws: Right

MLB debut
- June 17, 2026, for the Los Angeles Angels

MLB statistics (through 2026 season)
- Win–loss record: 0–0
- Earned run average: 3.95
- Strikeouts: 12
- Stats at Baseball Reference

Teams
- Los Angeles Angels (2026–present)

Brett Dustin Kerry (born April 12, 1999) is an American professional baseball pitcher for the Los Angeles Angels of Major League Baseball (MLB). He debuted in MLB in 2026.

== Amateur career ==
Born and raised in Clemmons, North Carolina, Kerry began his high school career at West Forsyth High School in Clemmons before transferring to Wesleyan Christian Academy in High Point, North Carolina. He went 10–1 with a 0.60 ERA as a senior in 2018. Unselected in the 2018 Major League Baseball draft, he enrolled at the University of South Carolina to play college baseball for the Gamecocks.

As a freshman at South Carolina in 2019, Kerry made 22 appearances (with two starts), going 4–1 with a 2.62 ERA, 65 strikeouts, and seven saves over 58 1/3 innings. After pitching only 15 innings in 2020 due to the COVID-19 pandemic, he spent the summer playing for the Lexington County Blowfish of the Coastal Plain League. For the 2021 season, Kerry made 17 appearances with three starts and went 5–1 with a 2.15 ERA and 84 strikeouts over 54 1/3 innings.

== Professional career ==
Following the 2021 collegiate season, Kerry was selected by the Los Angeles Angels in the fifth round of the 2021 Major League Baseball draft.

Kerry signed with the Angels and spent his first professional season with the Inland Empire 66ers of the Low-A West and the Rocket City Trash Pandas of the Double-A South, posting a 1.26 ERA over five starts and 14 1/3 innings. He returned to Rocket City for the 2022 season. Over 25 games (twenty starts), he went 5–7 with a 4.46 ERA and 118 strikeouts over 103 innings. To open the 2023 season, Kerry was assigned to Rocket City. He was promoted to the Salt Lake Bees of the Triple-A Pacific Coast League in early September. Over 27 games (23 starts) between the two teams, Kerry went 8–5 with 4.60 ERA and 122 strikeouts over 135 innings. In 2024, he pitched with both Rocket City and Salt Lake, going 5–6 with a 4.54 ERA over 27 games (22 starts) between both teams. In 2025, Kerry made 21 appearances for Salt Lake and went 8–9 with a 7.75 ERA and 81 strikeouts over 108 innings. Kerry was assigned to Salt Lake to begin the 2026 season, accumulating a 3–3 record and 5.92 ERA with 59 strikeouts across his first 14 appearances (including 11 starts).

On June 15, 2026, Kerry was selected to the 40-man roster and promoted to the major leagues for the first time. He made his MLB debut on June 17 at Chase Field against the Arizona Diamondbacks and pitched four innings in relief in which he gave up two earned runs on three hits and one walk, alongside recording two strikeouts, the first of his MLB career being Tommy Troy. He was optioned back to Salt Lake the next day. Kerry pitched in a total of three games for the Angels and ended the season with a 3.95 ERA and 12 strikeouts over 13 2/3 innings.
