= Kean Wong =

American baseball player (born 1995)

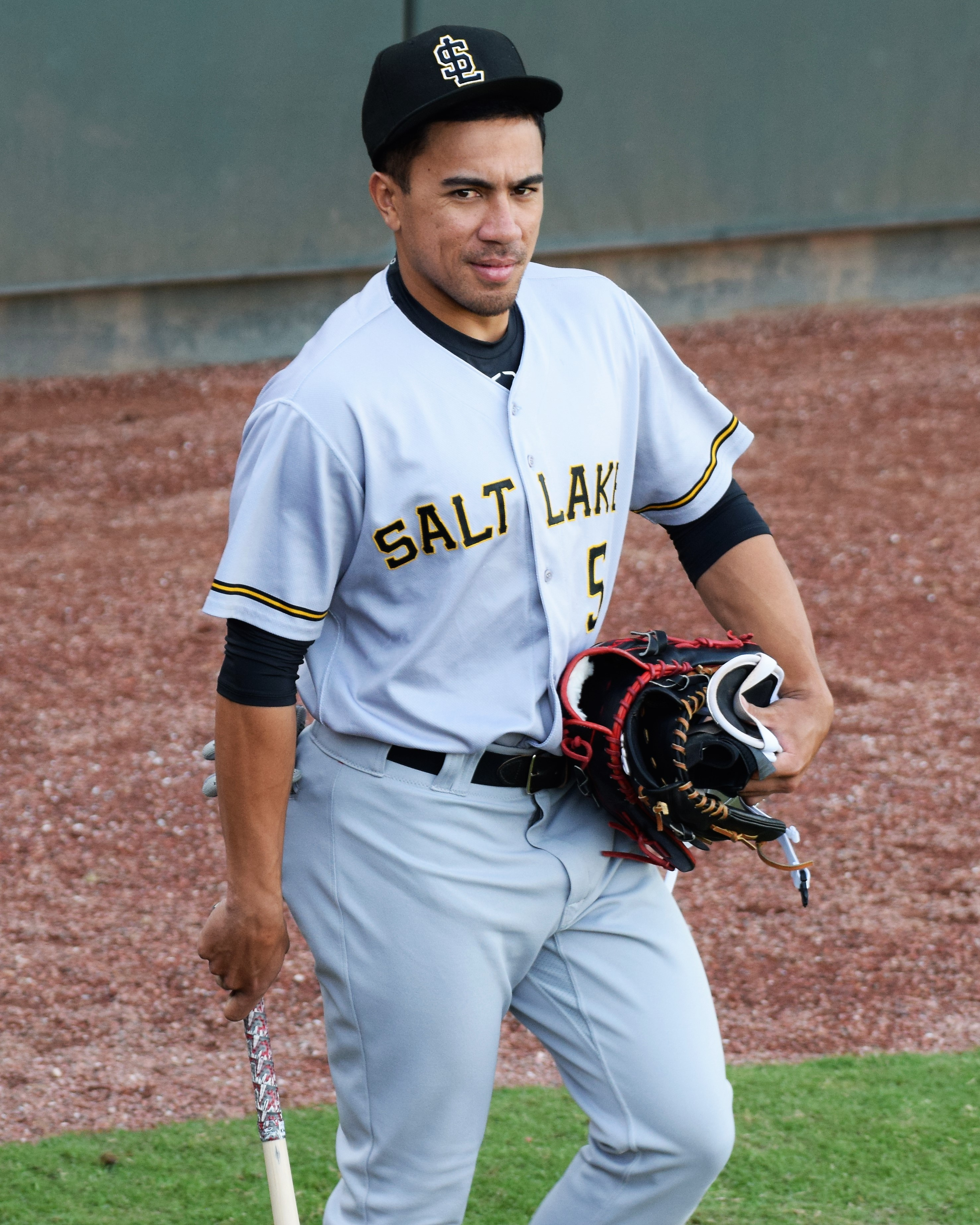
- Wong with the Salt Lake Bees in 2022
- Second baseman
- Born: April 17, 1995 (age 30); Hilo, Hawaii, U.S.
- Batted: Left Threw: Right

MLB debut
- September 5, 2019, for the Tampa Bay Rays

Last MLB appearance
- September 25, 2021, for the Los Angeles Angels

MLB statistics
- Batting average: .167
- Home runs: 0
- Runs batted in: 6
- Stats at Baseball Reference

Teams
- Tampa Bay Rays (2019); Los Angeles Angels (2019, 2021)

Kean Keanu Wong (born April 17, 1995) is an American former professional baseball second baseman. He played in Major League Baseball (MLB) for the Tampa Bay Rays and Los Angeles Angels. The Rays selected Wong in the fourth round of the 2013 MLB draft, and he made his MLB debut with them in 2019.

== Career ==
=== Amateur career ===
Wong attended Waiakea High School in Hilo, Hawaii. He committed to play college baseball at the University of Hawaii. The Tampa Bay Rays selected Wong in the fourth round of the 2013 MLB draft.

=== Tampa Bay Rays ===
Wong signed with the Rays, receiving a $400,000 signing bonus. After he signed, he played for the Gulf Coast Rays of the Rookie-level Gulf Coast League where he slashed .328/.377/.390 with 22 RBIs in 46 games.

Wong spent the 2014 season with the Bowling Green Hot Rods of the Class A Midwest League where he batted .306 with two home runs and 24 RBIs in 106 games. He was promoted to the Charlotte Stone Crabs in 2015, where he posted a .274 batting average with one home run and 36 RBIs along with 15 stolen bases in 103 games.

In 2016, Wong played for the Montgomery Biscuits where he batted .276/.324/.368 with five home runs and 56 RBIs in 117 games. In 2017, Wong played for the Durham Bulls where he batted .265/.328/.361 with five home runs and 44 RBIs in 105 games and was named the most valuable player of the Triple-A National Championship Game.

Wong returned to Durham in 2018, slashing .282/.345/.406 with nine home runs and 50 RBIs in 116 games. He returned to Durham for the 2019 season, producing a .307/.366/.464/.830 slash line with 10 home runs and 63 RBIs in 453 at bats.

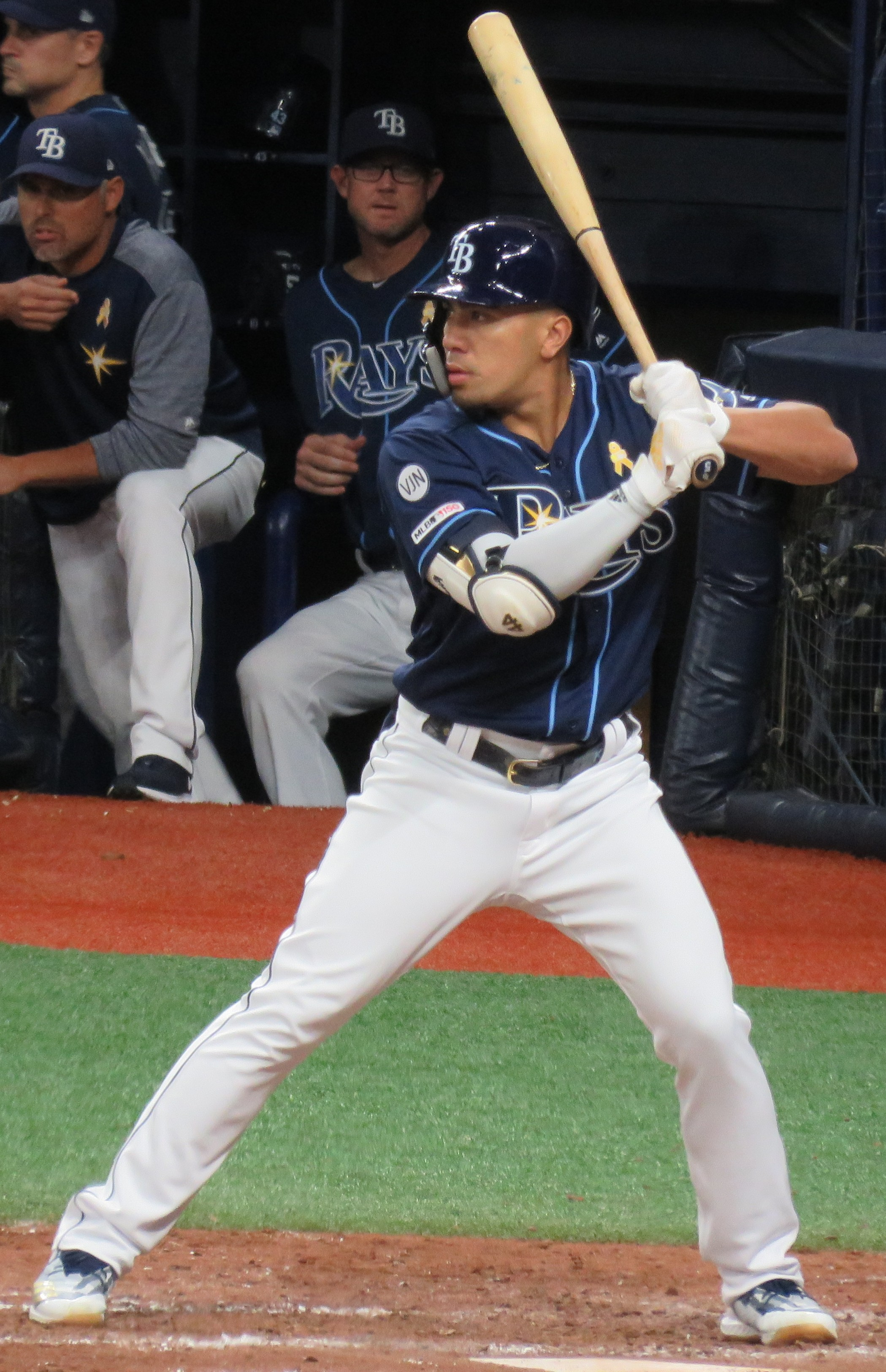
Wong batting for the Rays in 2019

On September 5, 2019, the Rays selected Wong's contract and promoted him to the major leagues. He made his major league debut that night versus the Toronto Blue Jays. He had three hits in 14 at bats in 2019 for the Rays. On September 22, Wong was designated for assignment.

=== Los Angeles Angels ===
On September 24, 2019, Wong was claimed off waivers by the Los Angeles Angels. He played in one game for the Angels and was hitless in four at bats.

=== San Francisco Giants ===
On November 5, 2019, Wong was claimed off waivers by the San Francisco Giants. On July 23, 2020, Wong was designated for assignment by San Francisco. He cleared waivers and was sent outright to the Triple-A Sacramento River Cats on July 30. Wong did not play in a game in 2020 due to the cancellation of the minor league season because of the COVID-19 pandemic. He became a free agent on November 2.

=== Los Angeles Angels (second stint) ===
On November 12, 2020, Wong signed a minor league contract with the Los Angeles Angels organization. On May 29, 2021, Wong was selected to the active roster. Wong would play in 32 games for the Angels in 2021, slashing .167/.194/.233 in 66 plate appearances. Wong was designated for assignment by the team on November 22. He was released by the team on November 24.

Wong would return to the Angels on a new minor league contract on March 16, 2022. He spent the year with the Triple-A Salt Lake Bees, playing in 128 games. In 497 at-bats, Wong slashed .262/.342/.332 with 3 home runs, 53 RBI, and 41 stolen bases. He elected free agency following the season on November 10.

=== Seattle Mariners ===
On February 20, 2023, Wong signed a minor league contract with the Seattle Mariners organization. In 33 games for the Triple–A Tacoma Rainiers, Wong batted .315/.422/.500 with 4 home runs and 24 RBI.

=== Chicago White Sox ===
On June 15, 2023, the Mariners traded Wong to the Chicago White Sox. In 17 games for the Triple–A Charlotte Knights, he hit .196/.308/.250 with 1 home run, 3 RBI, and 2 stolen bases. Wong was released by the White Sox organization on July 30.

== Personal life ==
His older brother, Kolten Wong, is also a baseball player. They have a sister, Kiani, who played softball at Hawaii.

His father, Kaha, instructed him on how to play baseball. Wong's mother, Keala Wong, died from cancer.
