= Packy Naughton =

American baseball player (born 1996)

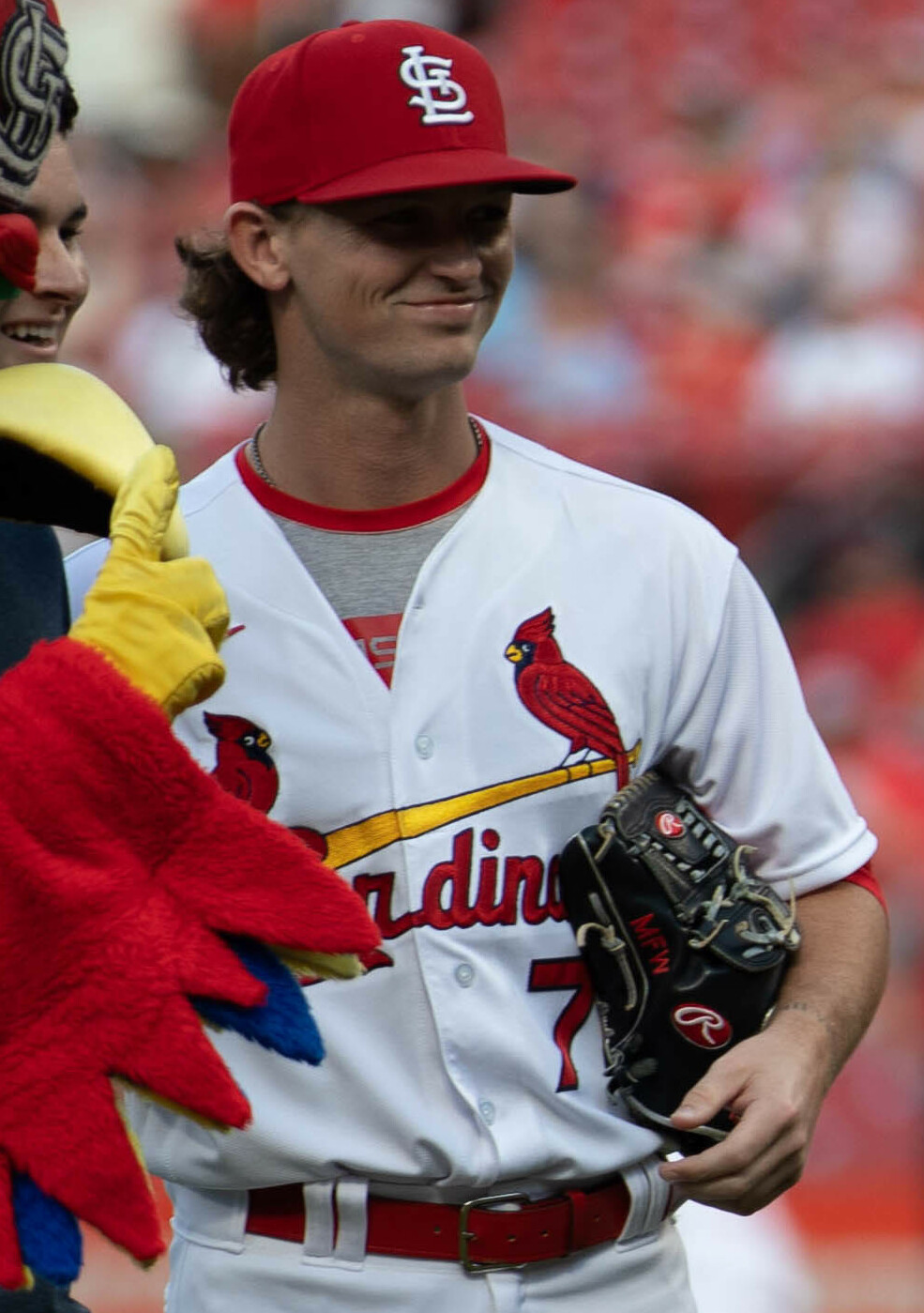
- Naughton with the St. Louis Cardinals
- Pitcher
- Born: April 16, 1996 (age 30); Boston, Massachusetts, U.S.
- Batted: Right Threw: Left

MLB debut
- August 8, 2021, for the Los Angeles Angels

Last MLB appearance
- April 7, 2023, for the St. Louis Cardinals

MLB statistics
- Win–loss record: 0–6
- Earned run average: 4.98
- Strikeouts: 48
- Stats at Baseball Reference

Teams
- Los Angeles Angels (2021); St. Louis Cardinals (2022–2023)

Patrick Joseph Naughton (born April 16, 1996) is an American former professional baseball pitcher. He played in Major League Baseball (MLB) for the Los Angeles Angels and St. Louis Cardinals from 2021 to 2023.

== Amateur career ==
Naughton attended Boston Latin School in Boston, Massachusetts, graduating in 2014. He underwent Tommy John surgery his junior year. He was not drafted out of high school in the 2014 Major League Baseball draft and thus enrolled at Virginia Tech where he played college baseball.

In 2015, Naughton's freshman year at Virginia Tech, he pitched 44 innings, going 2–1 with a 4.91 ERA and 35 strikeouts. As a sophomore in 2016, he appeared in 15 games (making 14 starts) in which he compiled a 3–7 record and a 6.75 ERA. That summer, he played in the Cape Cod Baseball League for the Harwich Mariners and was named a league all-star. In 2017, as a junior at Virginia Tech, he pitched in 17 games (seven starts) in which he went 2–6 with a 6.24 ERA, striking out 63 batters in 57 2/3 innings. After his junior year, he was selected by the Cincinnati Reds in the ninth round of the 2017 Major League Baseball draft.

== Professional career ==
=== Cincinnati Reds ===
Naughton signed with the Reds and made his professional debut with the Billings Mustangs of the Rookie Advanced Pioneer League. Over 14 games (12 starts), he went 3–3 with a 3.15 ERA, striking out 63 batters in 60 innings and earning All-Star honors. In 2018, he played with the Dayton Dragons of the Single-A Midwest League, pitching to a 5–10 record and 4.03 ERA over 28 starts. He began 2019 with the Daytona Tortugas of the High-A Florida State League, with whom he was named an All-Star, before being promoted to the Chattanooga Lookouts of the Double-A Southern League in May, finishing the season there. Over 28 starts between the two clubs, Naughton pitched to an 11–12 record with a 3.32 ERA, striking out 131 over 157 innings.

=== Los Angeles Angels ===
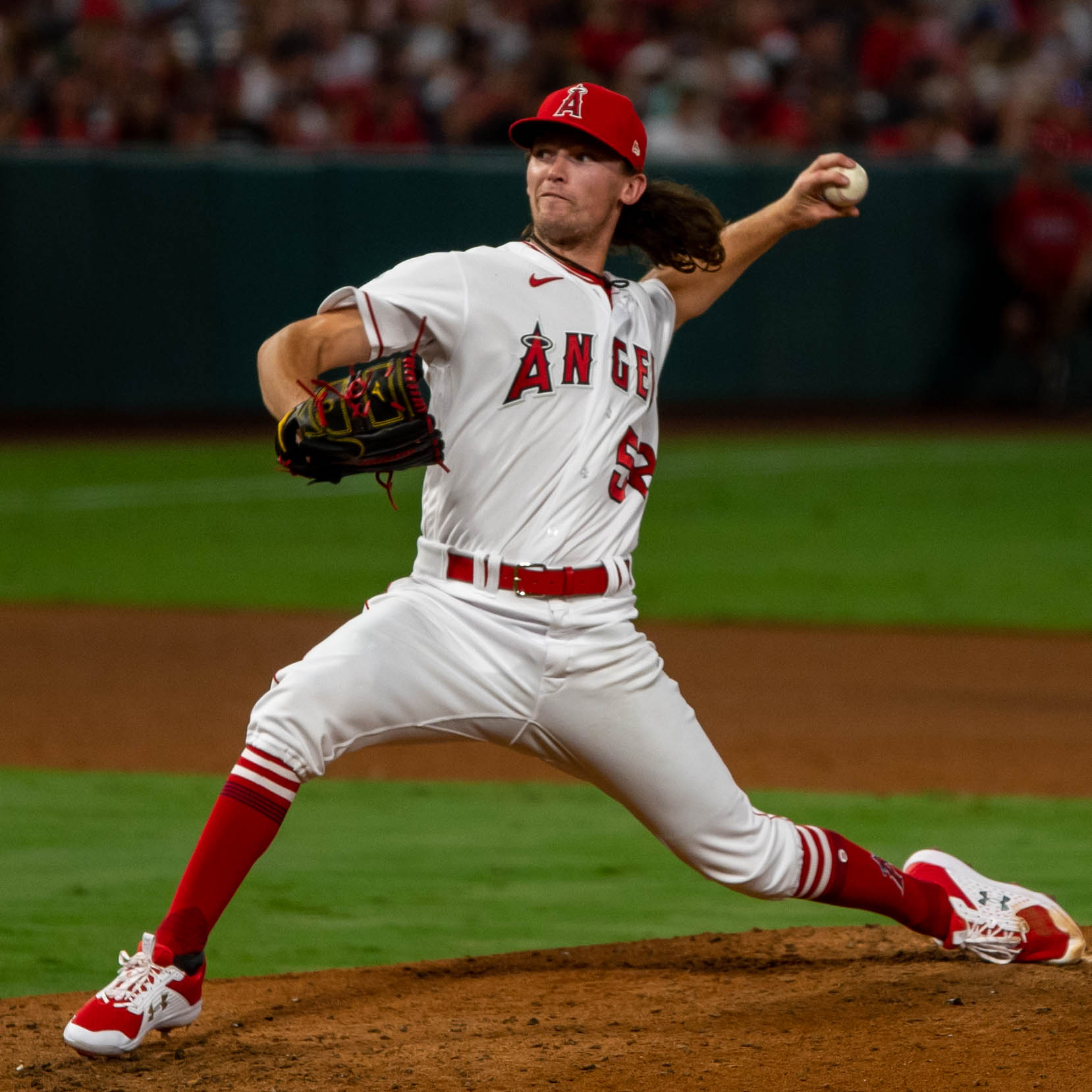
Naughton with the Los Angeles Angels in 2021.

On August 31, 2020, the Reds traded Naughton and Jose Salvador to the Los Angeles Angels in exchange for Brian Goodwin. He did not play in a game in 2020 due to the cancellation of the minor league season because of the COVID-19 pandemic. To begin the 2021 season, Naughton was assigned to the Rocket City Trash Pandas of the Double-A South. After one start, he was promoted to the Salt Lake Bees of the Triple-A West.

On August 4, 2021, the Angels selected Naughton's contract and promoted him to the major leagues. At the time of his promotion, he had a 5.34 ERA over 55 2/3 innings pitched between Rocket City and Salt Lake. On August 8, he made his major league debut in relief at Dodger Stadium against the Los Angeles Dodgers, giving up one run, one hit, and two walks over one inning. On September 1, against the New York Yankees, Naughton made his first career start, pitching 3 2/3 innings, allowing three runs and striking out two. Naughton finished the 2021 season with the Angels appearing in seven games (five starts) in which he went 0–4 with a 6.35 ERA, 14 walks, and 12 strikeouts over 22 2/3 innings.

On March 18, 2022, Naughton was designated for assignment by the Angels.

=== St. Louis Cardinals ===
On March 21, 2022, Naughton was claimed off waivers by the St. Louis Cardinals and joined the club's 40-man roster. He was assigned to the Memphis Redbirds of the Triple-A International League to begin the regular season. Naughton made his debut with the big league club on April 26, and pitched 1 1/3 scoreless innings against the New York Mets in an 0–3 loss. Naughton made 26 appearances for the Cardinals, logging a 4.78 ERA with 31 strikeouts and one save over 32 innings pitched.

Naughton made the Cardinals' Opening Day roster in 2023, as part of the team's bullpen. He made four scoreless appearances for St. Louis before leaving an outing against the Milwaukee Brewers on April 8 with an injury. He was placed on the 60-day injured list on May 17 with a left forearm strain. On June 28, Naughton underwent season–ending surgery to repair the flexor tendon in his left elbow. On November 14, Naughton was removed from the 40–man roster and sent outright to Triple-A Memphis.

Naughton made 15 rehab appearances for Memphis, the Single–A Palm Beach Cardinals, and the rookie–level Florida Complex League Cardinals in 2024. In July 2024, Naughton underwent ulnar collateral ligament reconstruction surgery, having also re–tore the flexor tendon he tore in 2023. On March 28, 2025, Naughton was placed on the full-season injured list, ending his season without appearing in a game.

On April 9, 2026, Naughton was placed on the injured list after departing a contest for Memphis with an apparent elbow injury. In three total appearances for the Redbirds, he had logged a 1–0 record and 3.86 ERA with three strikeouts across 2 1/3 innings pitched. On July 20, Naughton announced his retirement from professional baseball on his Instagram page.
