= José Rojas (baseball) =

American baseball player (born 1993)

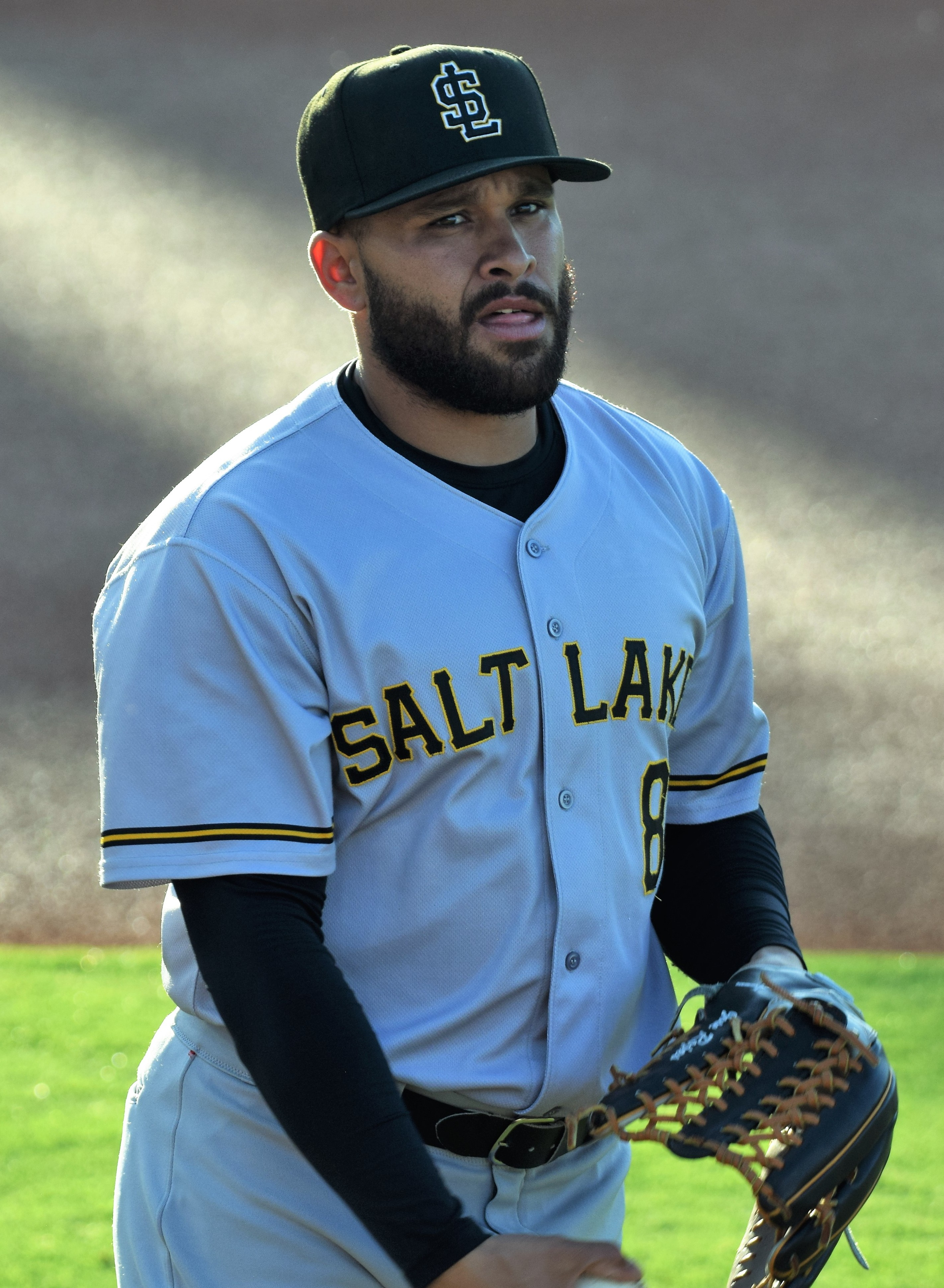
- Rojas with the Salt Lake Bees in 2022

Free agent
- Outfielder / Infielder
- Born: February 24, 1993 (age 33); Anaheim, California, U.S.
- Bats: Left Throws: Right

Professional debut
- MLB: April 2, 2021, for the Los Angeles Angels
- KBO: April 1, 2023, for the Doosan Bears

MLB statistics (through 2022 season)
- Batting average: .188
- Home runs: 6
- Runs batted in: 16

KBO statistics (through 2023 season)
- Batting average: .253
- Home runs: 19
- Runs batted in: 65
- Stats at Baseball Reference

Teams
- Los Angeles Angels (2021–2022); Doosan Bears (2023)

José Rojas (born February 24, 1993) is an American professional baseball outfielder and infielder who is a free agent. He attended Fullerton College and Vanguard University. Rojas was selected by the Los Angeles Angels in the 36th round of the 2016 MLB draft, and made his MLB debut with them in 2021. He has also played in the KBO League for the Doosan Bears.

== Amateur career ==
Rojas attended Anaheim High School in Anaheim, California. Undrafted out of high school, Rojas attended Fullerton College in Fullerton, California for two years (2013 and 2014). He then transferred to Vanguard University in Costa Mesa, California for his final two years (2015 and 2016) of college baseball. Rojas was selected by the Los Angeles Angels in the 36th round, with the 1086th overall selection, of the 2016 MLB draft.

== Professional career ==
=== Los Angeles Angels ===
Rojas made his professional debut in 2016 with the Orem Owlz, hitting .308/.372/.471 with five home runs and 31 RBI. He split the 2017 season between the Inland Empire 66ers and the Mobile BayBears, combining to hit .286/.321/.438 with 11 home runs and 70 RBI.

Rojas split the 2018 season between Mobile and the Salt Lake Bees, hitting a combined .289/.355/.501 with 17 home runs and 71 RBI. He was assigned back to Salt Lake for the 2019 season, slashing .293/.362/.577 with 101 runs (2nd in the league), 39 doubles (2nd), 7 triples (3rd), 31 home runs (5th), 107 RBI (leading the league), and 141 strikeouts (5th) over 126 games. Rojas did not play in a game in 2020 due to the cancellation of the Minor League Baseball season because of the COVID-19 pandemic.

On March 31, 2021, the Angels selected Rojas to the 40-man roster. He made his major league debut on April 2, pinch hitting for Max Stassi. On April 14, Rojas recorded his first major league hit off of Kansas City Royals pitcher Tyler Zuber. In 216 at-bats in Triple-A, he hit .259/.328/.431.

On May 23, 2022, Rojas was designated for assignment by Los Angeles. On May 30, Rojas cleared waivers and was sent outright to the Triple-A Salt Lake Bees. On August 2, the Angels selected his contract from Salt Lake. On September 1, Rojas was again designated for assignment. In 280 at-bats in Triple-A, he batted .275/.350/.571.

In his career in the major leagues with the Angels, he played 31 games in right field, 24 games at third base, 14 games at second base, 10 games in left field, and two games at first base. In 224 at-bats, he hit .188/.245/.339.

=== San Francisco Giants ===
On September 4, 2022, Rojas was claimed off waivers by the San Francisco Giants. In 7 games for the Triple–A Sacramento River Cats, he went 7–for–27 (.259) with 2 home runs and 2 RBI. On September 16, Rojas was designated for assignment by the Giants following the waiver claim of Taylor Jones. On September 18, he elected free agency in lieu of an outright assignment.

=== Doosan Bears ===
On October 26, 2022, Rojas signed a one-year contract with the Doosan Bears of the KBO League. Rojas made his KBO debut as the starting right fielder on April 1, 2023. In the game, Rojas hit a walk-off three-run home run off of Moon Kyeong-chan to seal a 12-10 victory over the Lotte Giants. He made 122 total appearances for Doosan, batting .253/.345/.474 with 19 home runs and 65 RBI.

=== New York Yankees ===
On January 18, 2024, Rojas signed a minor league contract with the New York Yankees. He was released by the Yankees on June 4, but re-signed with the organization on June 9. In 67 games for the Triple–A Scranton/Wilkes-Barre RailRiders, he batted .254/.359/.561 with 18 home runs and 57 RBI. Rojas was released again on July 14.

=== Pittsburgh Pirates ===
On July 25, 2024, Rojas signed a minor league contract with the Pittsburgh Pirates. In 15 games for the Triple–A Indianapolis Indians, he batted .192/.288/.423 with three home runs and six RBI. Rojas was released by the Pirates organization on September 2.

=== New York Yankees (second stint) ===
On March 18, 2025, Rojas signed a minor league contract with the New York Yankees. He made 124 appearances for the Triple-A Scranton/Wilkes-Barre RailRiders, slashing .287/.379/.599 with 32 home runs, 105 RBI, and 15 stolen bases. Rojas elected free agency following the season on November 6.

=== New York Mets ===
On November 10, 2025, Rojas signed a minor league contract with the New York Mets. In 17 games with the Triple–A Syracuse Mets, he batted .226/.288/.358 with two home runs, six RBI, and one stolen base. Rojas was released New York on August 3, 2026.
