= Jack Kruger =

American baseball player (born 1994)

- Catcher
- Born: October 26, 1994 (age 32); Los Angeles, California, U.S.
- Batted: Right Threw: Right

MLB debut
- May 6, 2021, for the Los Angeles Angels

Last MLB appearance
- May 6, 2021, for the Los Angeles Angels

MLB statistics
- Batting average: .000
- Home runs: 0
- Runs batted in: 0
- Stats at Baseball Reference

Teams
- Los Angeles Angels (2021)

Timothy John Kruger (born October 26, 1994) is an American former professional baseball catcher. He played in one game in Major League Baseball (MLB) for the Los Angeles Angels in 2021.

== Amateur career ==
Kruger attended Oaks Christian School in Westlake Village, California. In 2013, as a senior, he batted .343 with seven home runs and 37 RBIs. Undrafted out of high school in the 2013 MLB draft, he enrolled at the University of Oregon to play college baseball for the Oregon Ducks.

In 2014, as a freshman at Oregon, Kruger appeared in 28 games in which he hit .208 with one home runs and six RBIs. After the year, he transferred to Orange Coast College where he spent his sophomore season in which he batted .310 with 23 RBIs in 46 games. Following his breakout sophomore season, he enrolled at Mississippi State University. At Mississippi State, Kruger slashed .344/.435/.550 with eight home runs and forty RBIs in 56 games and was named to the All-SEC First Team.

== Professional career ==
=== Los Angeles Angels ===
After Kruger's junior year, he was selected by the Los Angeles Angels in the 20th round of the 2016 MLB draft. He signed for $395,000 and was assigned to the Arizona League Angels.

After playing three games for the AZL Angels, he was promoted to the Orem Owlz, where he finished the year. In thirty games between the two clubs, he hit .310/.354/.388 with 14 RBIs. In 2017, he began the season with the Burlington Bees before being promoted to the Inland Empire 66ers, batting a combined .240 with five home runs and 39 RBIs in 104 games. Kruger returned to the 66ers to begin 2018, with whom he was named a California League All-Star. He was promoted to the Mobile BayBears in June and finished the year there. In 97 games between the two teams, he slashed .299/.357/.413 with seven home runs, forty RBIs, and 13 stolen bases. He returned to Mobile to begin 2019, hitting .240 with three home runs and 34 RBIs over 92 games. He did not play a minor league game in 2020 due to the cancellation of the minor league season caused by the COVID-19 pandemic.

To begin the 2021 season, Kruger was assigned to the Salt Lake Bees. On May 6, 2021, Kruger was selected to the 40-man roster and promoted to the major leagues for the first time. He made his MLB debut that day as a defensive replacement for Kurt Suzuki but did not register a plate appearance. On May 7, Kruger was designated for assignment following the acquisition of Drew Butera.

=== Texas Rangers ===
On May 9, 2021, Kruger was claimed off waivers by the Texas Rangers. On May 15, Kruger was designated for assignment without having made an appearance for the team. On May 17, Kruger was outrighted to the Round Rock Express. Over 46 games with Round Rock, he batted .267 with three home runs and 16 RBI.

Kruger played in 20 games for Triple-A Round Rock in 2022, slashing .175/.242/.175 with no home runs and three RBI. He elected free agency following the season on November 10, 2022.
