= Mike Mayers =

American baseball player (born 1991)

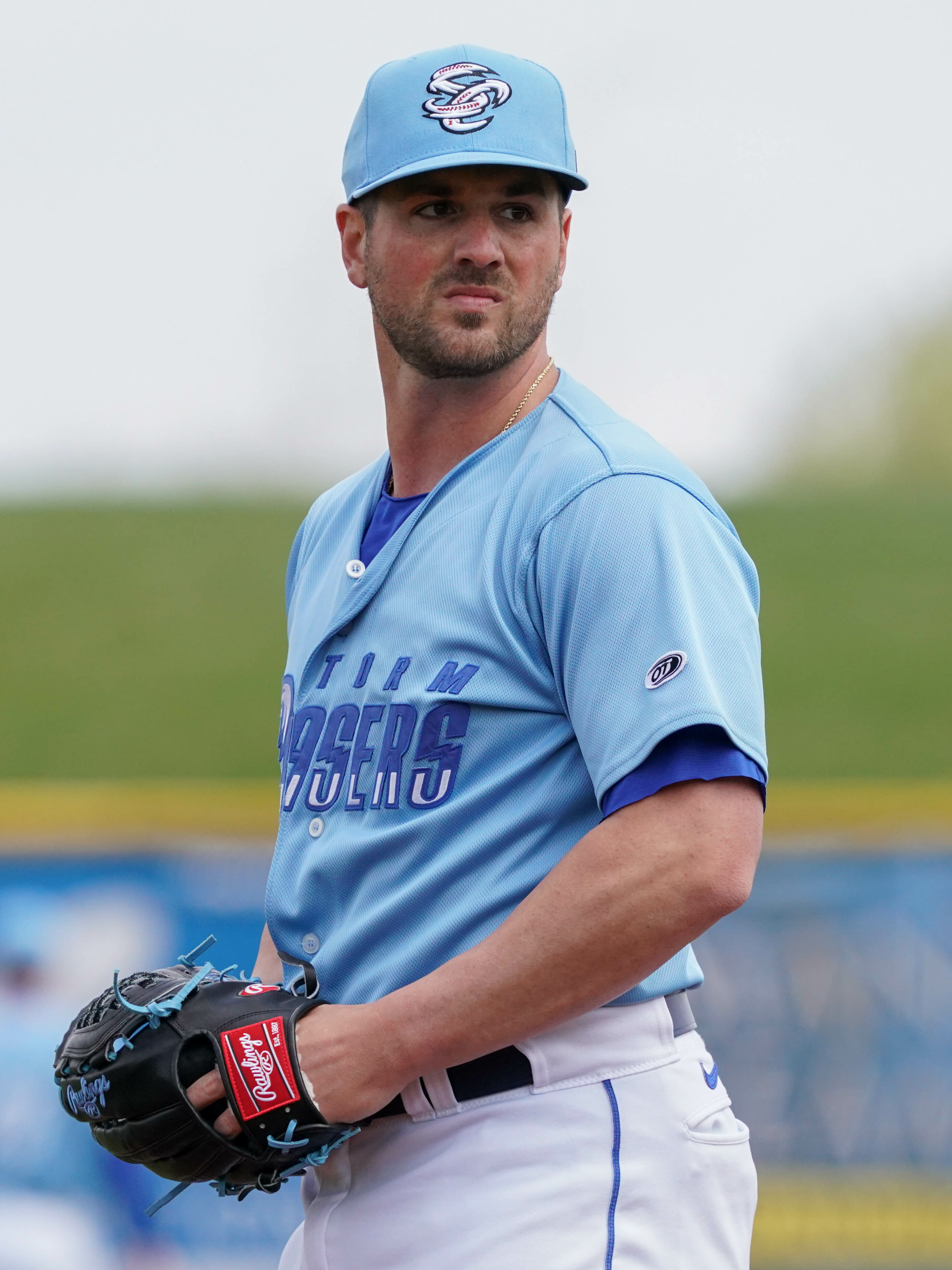
- Mayers with the Omaha Storm Chasers in 2023
- Pitcher
- Born: December 6, 1991 (age 34); Grove City, Ohio, U.S.
- Batted: Right Threw: Right

MLB debut
- July 24, 2016, for the St. Louis Cardinals

Last MLB appearance
- June 17, 2023, for the Kansas City Royals

MLB statistics
- Win–loss record: 12–11
- Earned run average: 5.21
- Strikeouts: 265
- Stats at Baseball Reference

Teams
- St. Louis Cardinals (2016–2019); Los Angeles Angels (2020–2022); Kansas City Royals (2023)

Michael Christopher Mayers (born December 6, 1991) is an American former professional baseball pitcher. He played in Major League Baseball (MLB) for the St. Louis Cardinals, Los Angeles Angels, and Kansas City Royals.

== Amateur career ==
Mayers attended Grove City High School in Grove City, Ohio where he played football, basketball, and baseball. He grew up a fan of the Cleveland Indians. As a junior at Grove City, he was 10–1 with a 1.57 ERA and as a senior, he compiled a 4–2 record with a 3.80 ERA.

Mayers was not drafted out of high school in the 2010 MLB draft and he enrolled at the University of Mississippi where he played college baseball for the Ole Miss Rebels. In 2012, he played collegiate summer baseball with the Bourne Braves of the Cape Cod Baseball League. On May 13, 2013, he was selected as a Southeastern Conference Co-Pitcher of the Week. In his junior year, he posted a 2.83 earned run average (ERA) over 92 1/3 innings pitched with 73 strikeouts and 37 walks. Overall, in his college career, he posted a 12–9 win–loss record with a 3.42 ERA and 171 strikeouts in 215 innings. He decided to forgo one remaining year of eligibility and avail himself to the Major League Baseball draft.

== Professional career ==
=== St. Louis Cardinals ===
The St. Louis Cardinals selected Mayers in the third round of the 2013 Major League Baseball draft. He signed and made his professional debut with the GCL Cardinals before being promoted to the Peoria Chiefs, where he finished the season. In 36 1/3 innings pitched between the two teams, he posted a 1–3 record and 2.97 ERA. He spent 2014 with the Palm Beach Cardinals, Springfield Cardinals, and Memphis Redbirds, compiling a combined 8–12 record, 3.39 ERA, and 1.37 WHIP in 26 starts between the two teams. In 2015, Mayers was 2–4 with an ERA of 5.87 for the GCL Cardinals and Springfield, and underwent surgery for thoracic outlet syndrome (TOS). Recovered from TOS, Mayers progressed through the two highest minor league levels in 2016. First, he pitched for Springfield, where he was a mid-season All-Star. Over nine starts for Springfield, Mayers was 5–2 with a 2.30 ERA. He was then promoted back to Memphis in May.

The Cardinals selected Mayers' contract from Memphis on July 23, 2016, and announced that he would make his Major League Baseball (MLB) debut the following day against the Los Angeles Dodgers on national television on ESPN's Sunday Night Baseball. He had a 3–3 record and 2.94 ERA over nine starts for Memphis prior to his promotion. In his debut, each of the first four batters he faced in the first inning reached base, and all scored on a grand slam by the fourth, first baseman Adrián González. In all, 10 of 14 batters reached base as Mayers surrendered nine earned runs, eight hits, and two walks, while recording four outs for an in-game ERA of 60.75. Per the Elias Sports Bureau, he became the first major leaguer to surrender at least nine runs while advancing through fewer than two innings in his debut. Said opposing starter Scott Kazmir of Mayers, "I felt for him, yeah. It's your debut, it's hot and it's on ESPN. It was a tough draw for him." The Cardinals optioned him back to Memphis the day after his first major league start. He got his first win, in relief on September 6, in Pittsburgh, pitching a perfect eighth inning.

During spring training 2018, Mayers pitched 12 scoreless innings, striking out 13, earning him a spot on the Opening Day roster. He was optioned to Memphis and recalled back to St. Louis six times before being recalled for a seventh, and final time, on June 8. He was placed on the disabled list for the first time in his major league career on August 26 with right shoulder inflammation, and activated on September 11. Mayers finished his 2018 campaign with a 2–1 record and a 4.70 ERA in fifty relief appearances.

Mayers began the 2019 season with St. Louis, but was placed on the injured list on April 17. He was activated on July 23. On August 4, Mayers was designated for assignment, and on August 6, he was outrighted to Memphis. On September 1, he was added to the expanded roster for September callups. Over 19 relief innings pitched with St. Louis, Mayers went 0–1 with a 6.63 ERA, striking out 16 batters.

=== Los Angeles Angels ===
On November 1, 2019, Mayers was claimed off waivers by the Los Angeles Angels. In his first season with the Angels, Mayers was their most effective reliever throughout the season, recording an ERA of 2.10 with 43 strikeouts in 30 innings. In 2021, Mayers recorded a 3.84 ERA with 90 strikeouts in 75 innings.

On May 26, 2022, Mayers was designated for assignment by Los Angeles. In 15 games, Mayers posted a 5.40 ERA with 14 strikeouts. He cleared waivers and was sent outright to the Triple-A Salt Lake Bees on June 2.

On August 6, Mayers was selected back to the major league roster. On September 27, Mayers was once again designated for assignment. He cleared waivers and was again sent outright to Salt Lake on October 2. Working as both a starter and reliever in 2022, he made 24 total appearances and registered a 5.68 ERA with 45 strikeouts in 50.2 innings pitched. He elected free agency on October 6.

=== Kansas City Royals ===
On December 22, 2022, Mayers signed a minor league contract with the Kansas City Royals. He was assigned to the Triple-A Omaha Storm Chasers to begin the 2023 season, where he made 8 starts and posted a 6.88 ERA with 29 strikeouts in 34.0 innings pitched. On May 17, 2023, Mayers' contract was selected to the active roster. In 6 games (2 starts) for Kansas City, he logged a 1–2 record and 6.15 ERA with 17 strikeouts in 26 1/3 innings of work. On June 18, Mayers was designated for assignment following the promotion of Brooks Kriske. He cleared waivers and accepted an outright assignment to Triple–A Omaha on June 21.

=== Chicago White Sox ===
On July 12, 2023, Mayers was traded to the Chicago White Sox in exchange for cash considerations. In 16 games for the Triple–A Charlotte Knights, he posted a 5.29 ERA with 28 strikeouts in 34.0 innings of work. On October 2, Mayers elected free agency.

=== Toronto Blue Jays ===
On March 19, 2024, Mayers signed a minor league contract with the Toronto Blue Jays. In 31 outings for the Triple–A Buffalo Bisons, he struggled to a 2–5 record and 6.10 ERA with 46 strikeouts over 41 1/3 innings pitched. Mayers was released by the Blue Jays organization on August 2.
