= 2024 Baltimore Orioles season =

Major League Baseball team season

2024 Baltimore Orioles
- American League Wild Card
- League: American League
- Division: East
- Ballpark: Oriole Park at Camden Yards
- City: Baltimore, Maryland
- Record: 91–71 (.562)
- Divisional place: 2nd
- Owners: David Rubenstein
- General managers: Mike Elias
- Managers: Brandon Hyde
- Television: MASN (Kevin Brown, Scott Garceau, Ben Wagner, Brett Hollander, Melanie Newman, Jim Palmer, Mike Devereaux, Brian Roberts, Brad Brach, Dave Johnson and Ben McDonald)
- Radio: WBAL-AM; Baltimore Orioles Radio Network (Geoff Arnold, Brett Hollander, and Melanie Newman)

The 2024 Baltimore Orioles season was the 124th season in Baltimore Orioles franchise history, the 71st in Baltimore, and the 33rd at Oriole Park at Camden Yards. They entered the season as the defending AL East champions.

The ballclub announced its first-ever jersey sponsorship deal with T. Rowe Price on June 10, 2024. A circular dark blue, aqua and white sleeve patch with the financial firm's bighorn sheep logo debuted in a home game against the Atlanta Braves the following night on June 11.

On September 24, the Orioles clinched a return to the postseason for the second straight season, the first time in 27 years they had been to the postseason in consecutive seasons. They were swept by the Kansas City Royals in the American League Wild Card Series, the second time the Orioles were swept in a postseason series by the Royals after the 2014 American League Championship Series.

== Offseason ==
The Orioles finished the 2023 season as AL East division champions and the top seed in the AL, but were swept by the Texas Rangers in the American League Division Series.

=== Camden Yards ===
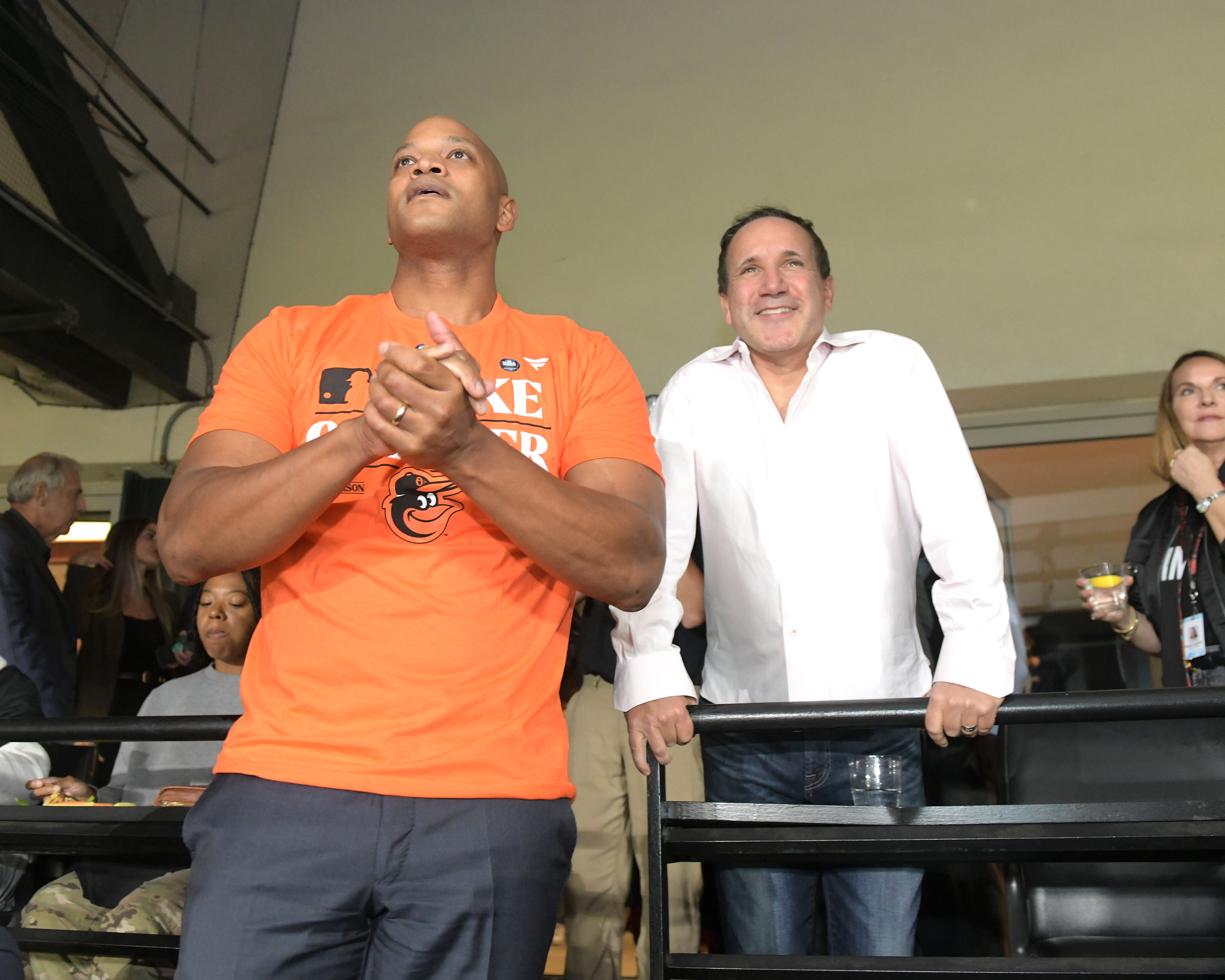
Stadium lease negotiations were led by Maryland Governor Wes Moore (left) and Orioles then-CEO John P. Angelos (right)

On September 28, 2023, it was reported that the Orioles came to an agreement with the City of Baltimore and the State of Maryland on a 30-year lease agreement with two five-year options that can extend the lease into the 2060s. Negotiations on the team's stadium lease were finalized in December 2023, which transferred responsibility for stadium operations and maintenance to the Orioles and reworked the team's rent payment terms, but postponed an agreement on the team's ground lease and redevelopment plans until 2027 following concerns from Maryland Senate President Bill Ferguson.

=== Ownership ===
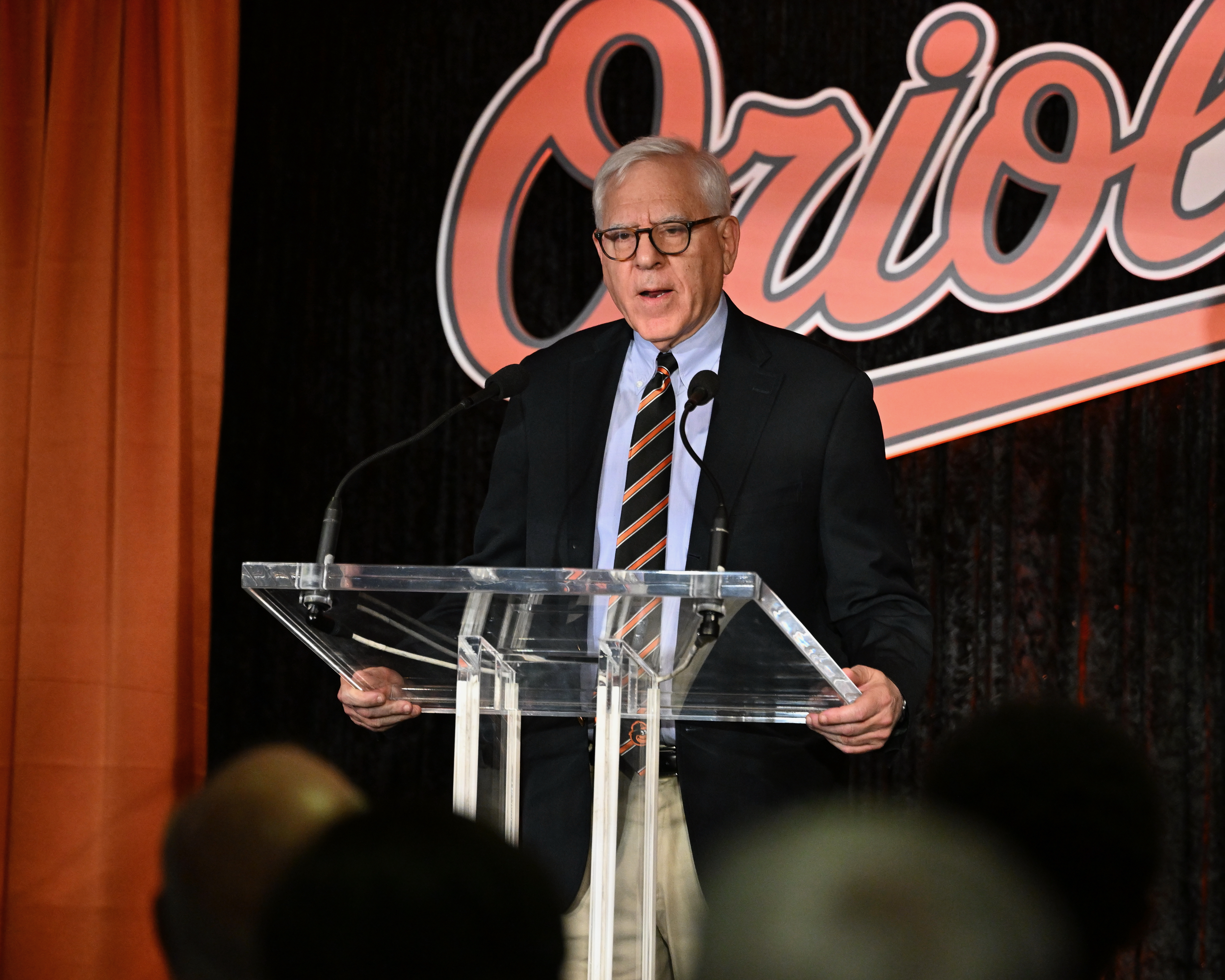
David Rubenstein addresses Orioles fans on Opening Day 2024

On January 30, 2024, team CEO John Angelos came to an agreement with a group of investors led by Baltimore native David Rubenstein to sell the team for $1.725 billion. The deal was approved by Major League Baseball owners on March 27, 2024.

=== Transactions ===
==== November 2023 ====
November 2	2B Adam Frazier, OF Aaron Hicks, RHPs Kyle Gibson, Jack Flaherty, Shintaro Fujinami and Austin Voth elected free agency

==== December 2023 ====
December 6	Orioles signed right-handed pitcher Craig Kimbrel to a 1-year, $13 million contract

==== February 2024 ====
February 1	Milwaukee Brewers traded right-handed pitcher Corbin Burnes to Baltimore Orioles for left-handed pitcher DL Hall, infielder Joey Ortiz and a 2024 draft pick

==== July 2024 ====
July 26	Philadelphia Phillies traded right-handed pitcher Seranthony Dominguez and outfielder Cristian Pache to Baltimore Orioles for outfielder Austin Hays.

==== Additions ====
- Signed right-handed reliever Craig Kimbrel to a 1-year contract on December 6, 2023
- Acquired right-handed pitcher Corbin Burnes from the Milwaukee Brewers in exchange for pitcher DL Hall, infielder Joey Ortiz and a 2024 draft pick

== Regular season standings ==
=== American League East ===
AL East
Team	W	L	Pct.	GB	Home	Road
New York Yankees	94	68	.580	—	44‍–‍37	50‍–‍31
Baltimore Orioles	91	71	.562	3	44‍–‍37	47‍–‍34
Boston Red Sox	81	81	.500	13	38‍–‍43	43‍–‍38
Tampa Bay Rays	80	82	.494	14	42‍–‍39	38‍–‍43
Toronto Blue Jays	74	88	.457	20	39‍–‍42	35‍–‍46

=== American League Wild Card ===
Division leaders
Team	W	L	Pct.
New York Yankees	94	68	.580
Cleveland Guardians	92	69	.571
Houston Astros	88	73	.547

Wild Card teams (Top 3 teams qualify for postseason)
Team	W	L	Pct.	GB
Baltimore Orioles	91	71	.562	+5
Kansas City Royals	86	76	.531	—
Detroit Tigers	86	76	.531	—
Seattle Mariners	85	77	.525	1
Minnesota Twins	82	80	.506	4
Boston Red Sox	81	81	.500	5
Tampa Bay Rays	80	82	.494	6
Texas Rangers	78	84	.481	8
Toronto Blue Jays	74	88	.457	12
Oakland Athletics	69	93	.426	17
Los Angeles Angels	63	99	.389	23
Chicago White Sox	41	121	.253	45

=== Record vs. opponents ===
==== Record vs. American League ====
2024 American League record Source: MLB Standings Grid – 2024
Team	BAL	BOS	CWS	CLE	DET	HOU	KC	LAA	MIN	NYY	OAK	SEA	TB	TEX	TOR	NL
Baltimore	—	8–5	6–1	3–4	2–4	2–5	4–2	4–2	6–0	8–5	3–3	4–2	9–4	5–2	7–6	20–26
Boston	5–8	—	4–3	2–5	3–4	2–4	4–2	4–2	3–3	6–7	5–1	4–3	6–7	4–2	8–5	21–25
Chicago	1–6	3–4	—	5–8	3–10	2–4	1–12	4–2	1–12	1–5	3–3	1–6	4–2	0–7	1–5	11–35
Cleveland	4–3	5–2	8–5	—	7–6	1–4	5–8	5–1	10–3	2–4	6–1	4–2	3–4	4–2	4–2	24–22
Detroit	4–2	4–3	10–3	6–7	—	2–4	6–7	3–4	6–7	2–4	3–3	5–1	5–1	3–4	5–2	22–24
Houston	5–2	4–2	4–2	4–1	4–2	—	4–3	9–4	2–4	1–6	8–5	5–8	4–2	7–6	5–2	22–24
Kansas City	2–4	2–4	12–1	8–5	7–6	3–4	—	5–2	6–7	2–5	4–2	3–3	3–3	1–5	5–2	23–23
Los Angeles	2–4	2–4	2–4	1–5	4–3	4–9	2–5	—	1–5	3–3	5–8	8–5	3–4	4–9	0–7	22–24
Minnesota	0–6	3–3	12–1	3–10	7–6	4–2	7–6	5–1	—	0–6	6–1	5–2	3–4	5–2	4–2	18–28
New York	5–8	7–6	5–1	4–2	4–2	6–1	5–2	3–3	6–0	—	5–2	4–3	7–6	3–3	7–6	23–23
Oakland	3–3	1–5	3–3	1–6	3–3	5–8	2–4	8–5	1–6	2–5	—	4–9	3–4	6–7	3–3	24–22
Seattle	2–4	3–4	6–1	2–4	1–5	8–5	3–3	5–8	2–5	3–4	9–4	—	3–3	10–3	2–4	26–20
Tampa Bay	4–9	7–6	2–4	4–3	1–5	2–4	3–3	4–3	4–3	6–7	4–3	3–3	—	1–5	9–4	26–20
Texas	2–5	2–4	7–0	2–4	4–3	6–7	5–1	9–4	2–5	3–3	7–6	3–10	5–1	—	2–4	19–27
Toronto	6–7	5–8	5–1	2–4	2–5	2–5	2–5	7–0	2–4	6–7	3–3	4–2	4–9	4–2	—	20–26

Updated with the results of all games through September 30, 2024.

==== Record vs. National League ====
2024 American League record vs. National League Source: MLB Standings
Team	AZ	ATL	CHC	CIN	COL	LAD	MIA	MIL	NYM	PHI	PIT	SD	SF	STL	WSH
Baltimore	2–1	2–1	0–3	3–0	2–1	1–2	1–2	1–2	1–2	2–1	1–2	1–2	1–2	0–3	2–2
Boston	0–3	1–3	2–1	2–1	1–2	0–3	3–0	1–2	0–3	2–1	3–0	1–2	2–1	1–2	2–1
Chicago	1–2	2–1	0–4	0–3	2–1	0–3	1–2	0–3	0–3	0–3	0–3	0–3	1–2	2–1	2–1
Cleveland	0–3	1–2	3–0	3–1	1–2	1–2	2–1	0–3	3–0	2–1	2–1	1–2	2–1	1–2	2–1
Detroit	2–1	0–3	1–2	3–0	2–1	2–1	1–2	1–2	2–1	1–2	2–2	1–2	1–2	2–1	1–2
Houston	2–1	0–3	0–3	0–3	4–0	2–1	3–0	2–1	2–1	1–2	1–2	1–2	1–2	2–1	1–2
Kansas City	1–2	1–2	1–2	3–0	1–2	1–2	2–1	2–1	1–2	1–2	2–1	1–2	0–3	3–1	3–0
Los Angeles	1–2	1–2	1–2	0–3	1–2	2–2	3–0	1–2	2–1	1–2	2–1	3–0	2–1	1–2	1–2
Minnesota	2–1	0–3	1–2	1–2	2–1	1–2	1–2	1–3	1–2	2–1	1–2	1–2	1–2	1–2	2–1
New York	2–1	1–2	2–1	0–3	2–1	1–2	2–1	2–1	0–4	3–0	1–2	2–1	3–0	1–2	1–2
Oakland	1–2	1–2	2–1	2–1	2–1	1–2	2–1	1–2	2–1	2–1	3–0	0–3	2–2	1–2	2–1
Seattle	2–1	2–1	1–2	3–0	2–1	0–3	1–2	1–2	3–0	2–1	1–2	3–1	2–1	2–1	1–2
Tampa Bay	3–0	1–2	2–1	2–1	2–1	1–2	3–1	1–2	3–0	0–3	2–1	1–2	2–1	1–2	2–1
Texas	2–2	1–2	2–1	2–1	0–3	2–1	2–1	0–3	1–2	0–3	2–1	1–2	1–2	1–2	2–1
Toronto	1–2	1–2	1–2	1–2	2–1	1–2	0–3	1–2	1–2	1–3	2–1	2–1	2–1	3–0	1–2

Updated with the results of all games through September 30, 2024.

== Game log ==
=== Regular season ===
Past games legend
Orioles Win (#bfb)	Orioles Loss (#fbb)	Game postponed (#bbb)	Clinched Playoff Berth (#039)
Bold denotes an Orioles pitcher

2024 Game Log: 91–71 (Home: 44–37; Road: 47–34)
March/April: 19–10 (Home: 11–6; Road: 8–4)

#	Date	Opponent	Score	Win	Loss	Save	Attendance	Record	Streak/ Box
1	March 28	Angels	11–3	**Burnes** (1–0)	Sandoval (0–1)	—	45,029	1–0	W1
2	March 30	Angels	13–4	**Rodriguez** (1–0)	Canning (0–1)	—	28,420	2–0	W2
3	March 31	Angels	1–4	Detmers (1–0)	**Wells** (0–1)	Estévez (1)	20,576	2–1	L1
4	April 1	Royals	6–4	**Kimbrel** (1–0)	Anderson (0–1)	—	12,666	3–1	W1
5	April 2	Royals	1–4	Marsh (1–0)	**Irvin** (0–1)	Smith (1)	9,404	3–2	L1
6	April 3	Royals	4–3	**Canó** (1–0)	Smith (0–2)	—	11,488	4–2	W1
7	April 5	@ Pirates	5–2	**Rodriguez** (2–0)	Jones (1–1)	**Kimbrel** (1)	38,400	5–2	W2
8	April 6	@ Pirates	4–5 (11)	Fleming (1–0)	**Heasley** (0–1)	—	24,089	5–3	L1
9	April 7	@ Pirates	2–3	Hernández (1–0)	**Canó** (1–1)	—	20,652	5–4	L2
10	April 9	@ Red Sox	7–1	**Burnes** (2–0)	Bello (1–1)	—	36,093	6–4	W1
11	April 10	@ Red Sox	7–5	**Baumann** (1–0)	Martin (1–1)	**Kimbrel** (2)	27,936	7–4	W2
12	April 11	@ Red Sox	9–4 (10)	**Kimbrel** (2–0)	Campbell (0–1)	—	26,230	8–4	W3
13	April 12	Brewers	1–11	Peralta (2–0)	**Wells** (0–2)	—	32,205	8–5	L1
14	April 13	Brewers	5–11	Peguero (3–0)	**Kremer** (0–1)	—	24,327	8–6	L2
15	April 14	Brewers	6–4	**Canó** (2–1)	Uribe (1–1)	**Kimbrel** (3)	35,085	9–6	W1
16	April 15	Twins	7–4	**Tate** (1–0)	Varland (0–3)	**Kimbrel** (4)	14,611	10–6	W2
17	April 16	Twins	11–3	**Rodriguez** (3–0)	Paddack (0–1)	—	18,108	11–6	W3
18	April 17	Twins	4–2	**Kimbrel** (3–0)	Jax (1–2)	—	15,860	12–6	W4
19	April 19	@ Royals	4–9	Marsh (3–0)	**Kremer** (0–2)	—	17,073	12–7	L1
20	April 20	@ Royals	9–7	**Burnes** (3–0)	Ragans (0–3)	**Kimbrel** (5)	23,118	13–7	W1
21	April 21	@ Royals	5–0	**Irvin** (1–1)	Lugo (3–1)	—	18,044	14–7	W2
22	April 22	@ Angels	4–2	**Suárez** (1–0)	Detmers (3–1)	**Kimbrel** (6)	26,081	15–7	W3
23	April 23	@ Angels	4–7	Canning (1–3)	**Rodriguez** (3–1)	Estévez (4)	22,803	15–8	L1
24	April 24	@ Angels	6–5	**Kremer** (1–2)	Anderson (2–3)	**Kimbrel** (7)	19,557	16–8	W1
25	April 26	Athletics	2–3 (10)	Spence (2–1)	**Webb** (0–1)	Miller (7)	22,965	16–9	L1
26	April 27	Athletics	7–0	**Irvin** (2–1)	Sears (1–2)	—	28,364	17–9	W1
27	April 28	Athletics	6–7	McFarland (1–0)	**Kimbrel** (3–1)	Erceg (1)	40,887	17–10	L1
28	April 29	Yankees	2–0	**Rodriguez** (4–1)	Schmidt (2–1)	**Coulombe** (1)	23,184	18–10	W1
29	April 30	Yankees	4–2	**Kremer** (2–2)	Cortés Jr. (1–3)	**Webb** (1)	21,949	19–10	W2

May: 17–9 (Home: 9–5; Road: 8–4)

#	Date	Opponent	Score	Win	Loss	Save	Attendance	Record	Streak/ Box
30	May 1	Yankees	0–2	Gil (2–1)	**Burnes** (3–1)	Holmes (10)	24,180	19–11	L1
31	May 2	Yankees	7–2	**Akin** (1–0)	Rodón (2–2)	—	27,299	20–11	W1
32	May 3	@ Reds	3–0	**Irvin** (3–1)	Pagán (2–2)	**Kimbrel** (8)	25,861	21–11	W2
33	May 4	@ Reds	2–1	**Means** (1–0)	Abbott (1–4)	**Canó** (1)	33,202	22–11	W3
34	May 5	@ Reds	11–1	**Kremer** (3–2)	Lodolo (3–1)	—	31,514	23–11	W4
35	May 7	@ Nationals	0–3	Williams (4–0)	**Burnes** (3–2)	Finnegan (12)	29,542	23–12	L1
36	May 8	@ Nationals	7–6 (12)	**Suárez** (2–0)	Weems (1–1)	**Webb** (2)	34,078	24–12	W1
37	May 10	Diamondbacks	4–2	**Irvin** (4–1)	Pfaadt (1–3)	**Canó** (2)	27,703	25–12	W2
38	May 11	Diamondbacks	5–4 (11)	**Kimbrel** (4–1)	Jarvis (0–2)	—	27,882	26–12	W3
39	May 12	Diamondbacks	2–9	Gallen (5–2)	**Kremer** (3–3)	—	31,448	26–13	L1
40	May 13	Blue Jays	2–3 (10)	Romano (1–0)	**Webb** (0–2)	—	24,358	26–14	L2
—	May 14	Blue Jays	Postponed (rain); Makeup: July 29						
41	May 15	Blue Jays	3–2	**Coulombe** (1–0)	Romano (1–1)	—	29,578	27–14	W1
42	May 17	Mariners	9–2	**Means** (2–0)	Miller (3–4)	—	38,882	28–14	W2
43	May 18	Mariners	3–4	Stanek (2–0)	**Canó** (2–2)	Muñoz (8)	19,286	28–15	L1
44	May 19	Mariners	6–3	**Burnes** (4–2)	Kirby (4–4)	**Kimbrel** (9)	30,494	29–15	W1
45	May 20	@ Cardinals	3–6	Gray (6–2)	**Kremer** (3–4)	Helsley (14)	35,598	29–16	L1
46	May 21	@ Cardinals	1–3 (Note: The May 21 game was suspended due to rain in the bottom of the sixth inning with the game tied 1–1; it resumed on May 22, with the Orioles losing 3–1)	Lynn (2–2)	**Webb** (0–3)	Helsley (15)	32,582	29–17	L2
47	May 22	@ Cardinals	4–5	King (1–1)	**Irvin** (4–2)	Fernandez (1)	33,324	29–18	L3
48	May 23	@ White Sox	8–6	**Rodriguez** (5–1)	Clevinger (0–3)	**Kimbrel** (10)	15,843	30–18	W1
49	May 24	@ White Sox	6–4	**Canó** (3–2)	Brebbia (0–3)	**Kimbrel** (11)	18,831	31–18	W2
50	May 25	@ White Sox	5–3	**Tate** (2–0)	Kopech (1–4)	**Pérez** (1)	22,283	32–18	W3
51	May 26	@ White Sox	4–1	**Bradish** (1–0)	Crochet (5–5)	**Kimbrel** (12)	14,992	33–18	W4
52	May 27	Red Sox	11–3	**Irvin** (5–2)	Criswell (2–2)	—	40,951	34–18	W5
53	May 28	Red Sox	3–8	Bello (6–2)	**Rodriguez** (5–2)	—	17,970	34–19	L1
54	May 29	Red Sox	6–1	**Burnes** (5–2)	Crawford (2–4)	—	18,857	35–19	W1
55	May 31	Rays	3–1	**Pérez** (1–0)	Lovelady (1–4)	**Kimbrel** (13)	27,364	36–19	W2

June: 17–12 (Home: 9–6; Road: 8–6)

#	Date	Opponent	Score	Win	Loss	Save	Attendance	Record	Streak/ Box
56	June 1	Rays	9–5	**Webb** (1–3)	Bradley (1–3)	—	36,958	37–19	W3
57	June 2	Rays	3–4	Armstrong (2–1)	**Tate** (2–1)	Fairbanks (6)	32,463	37–20	L1
58	June 3	@ Blue Jays	7–2	**Rodriguez** (6–2)	Gausman (4–4)	—	23,842	38–20	W1
59	June 4	@ Blue Jays	10–1	**Burnes** (6–2)	Cabrera (2–2)	—	28,816	39–20	W2
60	June 5	@ Blue Jays	2–3	García (2–0)	**Kimbrel** (4–2)	—	27,929	39–21	L1
61	June 6	@ Blue Jays	5–6	Kikuchi (3–5)	**Povich** (0–1)	García (4)	39,215	39–22	L2
62	June 7	@ Rays	6–3	**Irvin** (6–2)	Civale (2–5)	**Kimbrel** (14)	17,882	40–22	W1
63	June 8	@ Rays	5–0	**Bradish** (2–0)	Bradley (1–4)	—	20,485	41–22	W2
64	June 9	@ Rays	9–2	**Rodriguez** (7–2)	Littell (2–4)	—	20,386	42–22	W3
65	June 10	@ Rays	5–2	**Burnes** (7–2)	Pepiot (4–3)	**Kimbrel** (15)	14,686	43–22	W4
66	June 11	Braves	4–0	**Suárez** (3–0)	Fried (6–3)	—	24,048	44–22	W5
67	June 12	Braves	4–2	**Akin** (2–0)	Jiménez (1–2)	**Kimbrel** (16)	24,122	45–22	W6
68	June 13	Braves	3–6	López (4–2)	**Irvin** (6–3)	Iglesias (17)	33,700	45–23	L1
69	June 14	Phillies	3–5 (11)	Kerkering (2–0)	**Webb** (1–4)	Domínguez (1)	43,987	45–24	L2
70	June 15	Phillies	6–2	**Rodriguez** (8–2)	Walker (3–2)	—	44,555	46–24	W1
71	June 16	Phillies	8–3	**Burnes** (8–2)	Wheeler (8–4)	**Canó** (3)	44,525	47–24	W2
72	June 18	@ Yankees	2–4	Cortés Jr. (4–5)	**Suárez** (3–1)	—	47,429	47–25	L1
73	June 19	@ Yankees	7–6 (10)	**Kimbrel** (5–2)	Holmes (1–3)	**Tate** (1)	47,155	48–25	W1
74	June 20	@ Yankees	17–5	**Baker** (1–0)	Gil (9–2)	—	45,456	49–25	W2
75	June 21	@ Astros	11–14	Dubin (1–1)	**Rodriguez** (8–3)	Abreu (1)	38,596	49–26	L1
76	June 22	@ Astros	1–5	Blanco (8–2)	**Burnes** (8–3)	—	37,107	49–27	L2
77	June 23	@ Astros	1–8	Valdez (6–5)	**Suárez** (3–2)	—	37,014	49–28	L3
78	June 24	Guardians	2–3	Bibee (6–2)	**Povich** (0–2)	Barlow (2)	20,309	49–29	L4
79	June 25	Guardians	8–10	Ávila (2–1)	**Irvin** (6–4)	Clase (25)	18,574	49–30	L5
80	June 26	Guardians	4–2	**Rodriguez** (9–3)	Curry (0–2)	**Kimbrel** (17)	17,965	50–30	W1
81	June 27	Rangers	11–2	**Burnes** (9–3)	Gray (3–4)	—	29,479	51–30	W2
82	June 28	Rangers	2–1	**Suárez** (4–2)	Scherzer (1–1)	**Kimbrel** (18)	27,666	52–30	W3
83	June 29	Rangers	6–5	**Povich** (1–2)	Lorenzen (4–4)	**Kimbrel** (19)	44,286	53–30	W4
84	June 30	Rangers	2–11	Heaney (3–9)	**Irvin** (6–5)	—	23,439	53–31	L1

July: 12–13 (Home: 5–8; Road: 7–5)

#	Date	Opponent	Score	Win	Loss	Save	Attendance	Record	Streak/ Box
85	July 2	@ Mariners	2–0	**Rodriguez** (10–3)	Kirby (7–6)	**Kimbrel** (20)	36,173	54–31	W1
86	July 3	@ Mariners	4–1	**Kremer** (4–4)	Gilbert (5–5)	**Kimbrel** (21)	37,998	55–31	W2
87	July 4	@ Mariners	3–7	Stanek (6–2)	**Baker** (1–1)	—	32,347	55–32	L1
88	July 5	@ Athletics	3–2	**Suárez** (5–2)	Harris (1–3)	**Kimbrel** (22)	9,654	56–32	W1
89	July 6	@ Athletics	8–19	Medina (2–3)	**Povich** (1–3)	—	8,526	56–33	L1
90	July 7	@ Athletics	6–3	**Rodriguez** (11–3)	Spence (5–5)	**Kimbrel** (23)	14,524	57–33	W1
91	July 9	Cubs	2–9	Taillon (6–4)	**Kremer** (4–5)	—	30,373	57–34	L1
92	July 10	Cubs	0–4	Imanaga (8–2)	**Burnes** (9–4)	—	20,694	57–35	L2
93	July 11	Cubs	0–8	Steele (2–3)	**Suárez** (5–3)	—	22,685	57–36	L3
94	July 12	Yankees	1–4	Cole (2–1)	**Povich** (1–4)	Holmes (21)	39,566	57–37	L4
95	July 13	Yankees	1–6	Gil (10–5)	**Rodriguez** (11–4)	—	44,018	57–38	L5
96	July 14	Yankees	6–5	**Kimbrel** (6–2)	Holmes (1–4)	—	39,031	58–38	W1
ASG	July 16	@ Globe Life Field	NL @ AL	Miller (1–0)	Greene (0–1)	Clase (1)	39,343	—	ASG
97	July 19	@ Rangers	9–1	**Burnes** (10–4)	Eovaldi (6–4)	—	36,336	59–38	W2
98	July 20	@ Rangers	8–4	**Rodriguez** (12–4)	Scherzer (1–3)	—	38,410	60–38	W3
99	July 21	@ Rangers	2–3	Heaney (4–10)	**Kremer** (4–6)	Yates (17)	31,808	60–39	L1
100	July 23	@ Marlins	3–6	Puk (4–8)	**Suárez** (5–4)	Scott (17)	10,410	60–40	L2
101	July 24	@ Marlins	3–6	Nardi (2–1)	**Webb** (1–5)	Scott (18)	12,127	60–41	L3
102	July 25	@ Marlins	7–6 (10)	**Canó** (4–2)	Faucher (2–2)	**Pérez** (2)	17,989	61–41	W1
103	July 26	Padres	4–6	Suárez (5–1)	**Kimbrel** (6–3)	—	43,692	61–42	L1
104	July 27	Padres	4–9	King (9–6)	**Kremer** (4–7)	—	30,008	61–43	L2
105	July 28	Padres	8–6	**Pérez** (2–0)	Vásquez (3–6)	**Canó** (4)	38,411	62–43	W1
106	July 29 (1)	Blue Jays	11–5	**Eflin** (6–7)	Rodríguez (1–4)	—	see 2nd game	63–43	W2
107	July 29 (2)	Blue Jays	4–8	Francis (4–2)	**Povich** (1–5)	—	22,272	63–44	L1
108	July 30	Blue Jays	6–2	**Burnes** (11–4)	Bassitt (8–10)	—	21,710	64–44	W1
109	July 31	Blue Jays	10–4	**Rodriguez** (13–4)	Espino (0–1)	—	25,528	65–44	W2

August: 13–15 (Home: 5–5; Road: 8–10)

#	Date	Opponent	Score	Win	Loss	Save	Attendance	Record	Streak/ Box
110	August 1	@ Guardians	3–10	Lively (10–6)	**Rogers** (2–10)	—	26,194	65–45	L1
111	August 2	@ Guardians	4–8	Smith (6–1)	**Kremer** (4–8)	—	35,137	65–46	L2
112	August 3	@ Guardians	7–4	**Eflin** (7–7)	Cantillo (0–1)	**Canó** (5)	37,251	66–46	W1
113	August 4	@ Guardians	9–5	**Burnes** (12–4)	Williams (1–4)	—	33,628	67–46	W2
114	August 6	@ Blue Jays	2–5	Bassitt (9–10)	**Soto** (2–5)	Green (9)	35,051	67–47	L1
115	August 7	@ Blue Jays	7–3	**Smith** (3–0)	Burr (0–1)	—	37,547	68–47	W1
116	August 8	@ Blue Jays	6–7	Gausman (10–8)	**Kremer** (4–9)	Green (10)	27,910	68–48	L1
117	August 9	@ Rays	4–1	**Eflin** (8–7)	Littell (5–8)	—	20,673	69–48	W1
118	August 10	@ Rays	7–5	**Smith** (4–0)	Poche (1–2)	**Domínguez** (2)	23,898	70–48	W2
119	August 11	@ Rays	1–2	Rodríguez (2–2)	**Kimbrel** (6–4)	Fairbanks (23)	16,848	70–49	L1
120	August 13	Nationals	3–9	Irvin (9–10)	**Rogers** (2–11)	—	29,090	70–50	L2
121	August 14	Nationals	4–1	**Kremer** (5–9)	Herz (2–5)	**Domínguez** (3)	26,479	71–50	W1
122	August 15	Red Sox	5–1	**Eflin** (9–7)	Pivetta (5–8)	—	25,445	72–50	W2
123	August 16	Red Sox	10–12	Criswell (5–4)	**Burnes** (12–5)	Jansen (23)	34,541	72–51	L1
124	August 17	Red Sox	1–5	Bello (11–5)	**Povich** (1–6)	—	38,921	72–52	L2
125	August 18	Red Sox	4–2	**Suárez** (6–4)	Crawford (8–10)	**Domínguez** (4)	27,104	73–52	W1
126	August 19	@ Mets	3–4	Díaz (4–1)	**Domínguez** (3–3)	—	26,874	73–53	L1
127	August 20	@ Mets	9–5	**Kremer** (6–9)	Quintana (6–9)	—	34,225	74–53	W1
128	August 21	@ Mets	3–4	Díaz (5–1)	**Domínguez** (3–4)	—	32,871	74–54	L1
129	August 22	Astros	0–6	Arrighetti (6–11)	**Burnes** (12–6)	—	22,212	74–55	L2
130	August 23	Astros	7–5	**Kimbrel** (7–4)	Abreu (2–2)	**Domínguez** (5)	39,578	75–55	W1
131	August 24	Astros	3–2	**Akin** (3–0)	Valdez (13–6)	**Domínguez** (6)	35,302	76–55	W2
132	August 25	Astros	3–6	Neris (9–4)	**Smith** (4–1)	Hader (28)	21,654	76–56	L1
133	August 27	@ Dodgers	3–2	**Bowman** (1–0)	Flaherty (10–6)	**Domínguez** (7)	52,382	77–56	W1
134	August 28	@ Dodgers	4–6	Banda (2–2)	**Burnes** (12–7)	Kopech (12)	53,290	77–57	L1
135	August 29	@ Dodgers	3–6	Miller (2–3)	**Povich** (1–7)	Phillips (17)	53,203	77–58	L2
136	August 30	@ Rockies	5–3	**Suárez** (7–4)	Gomber (4–10)	**Domínguez** (8)	30,444	78–58	W1
137	August 31	@ Rockies	5–7	Criswell (1–0)	**Kimbrel** (7–5)	Kinley (8)	38,166	78–59	L1

September: 13–12 (Home: 5–7; Road: 8–5)

#	Date	Opponent	Score	Win	Loss	Save	Attendance	Record	Streak/ Box
138	September 1	@ Rockies	6–1	**Eflin** (10–7)	Blach (3–7)	—	32,961	79–59	W1
139	September 2	White Sox	13–3	**Burnes** (13–7)	Flexen (2–14)	**Irvin** (1)	35,906	80–59	W2
140	September 3	White Sox	9–0	**Povich** (2–7)	Nastrini (0–7)	—	15,108	81–59	W3
141	September 4	White Sox	1–8	Cannon (3–9)	**Suárez** (7–5)	—	17,843	81–60	L1
142	September 6	Rays	2–0	**Kremer** (7–9)	Baz (2–3)	**Domínguez** (9)	25,439	82–60	W1
143	September 7	Rays	1–7	Pepiot (8–6)	**Eflin** (10–8)	—	34,256	82–61	L1
144	September 8	Rays	0–2	Littell (6–9)	**Burnes** (13–8)	Uceta (2)	29,519	82–62	L2
145	September 9	@ Red Sox	3–12	Bello (13–7)	**Povich** (2–8)	Winckowski (2)	30,600	82–63	L3
146	September 10	@ Red Sox	5–3	**Suárez** (8–5)	Crawford (8–14)	**Domínguez** (10)	30,898	83–63	W1
147	September 11	@ Red Sox	3–5 (10)	Weissert (4–2)	**Akin** (3–1)	—	32,448	83–64	L1
148	September 13	@ Tigers	0–1	Hurter (5–1)	**Eflin** (10–9)	Holton (8)	25,253	83–65	L2
149	September 14	@ Tigers	4–2	**Burnes** (14–8)	Madden (1–1)	—	33,513	84–65	W1
150	September 15	@ Tigers	2–4	Montero (6–6)	**Povich** (2–9)	Foley (23)	20,643	84–66	L1
151	September 17	Giants	0–10	Snell (4–3)	**Suárez** (8–6)	—	23,967	84–67	L2
152	September 18	Giants	3–5	Birdsong (4–5)	**Kremer** (7–10)	Walker (8)	23,856	84–68	L3
153	September 19	Giants	5–3	**Soto** (3–5)	Walker (9–4)	—	23,181	85–68	W1
154	September 20	Tigers	7–1	**Burnes** (15–8)	Holton (7–2)	—	33,629	86–68	W2
155	September 21	Tigers	4–6 (10)	Brieske (3–4)	**Canó** (4–3)	—	39,647	86–69	L1
156	September 22	Tigers	3–4	Guenther (2–0)	**Suárez** (8–7)	Foley (26)	44,040	86–70	L2
157	September 24	@ Yankees	5–3	**Kremer** (8–10)	Schmidt (5–5)	**Domínguez** (11)	41,149	87–70	W1
158	September 25	@ Yankees	9–7	**Webb** (2–5)	Stroman (10–9)	**Akin** (1)	41,010	88–70	W2
159	September 26	@ Yankees	1–10	Cole (8–5)	**Burnes** (15–9)	—	42,022	88–71	L1
160	September 27	@ Twins	7–2	**Povich** (3–9)	López (15–10)	—	26,058	89–71	W1
161	September 28	@ Twins	9–2	**Davidson** (1–0)	Matthews (1–4)	—	30,558	90–71	W2
162	September 29	@ Twins	6–2	**Suárez** (9–7)	Ober (12–9)	—	26,041	91–71	W3

== Post-season ==
Past games legend
Orioles Win (#bfb)	Orioles Loss (#fbb)	Game postponed (#bbb)
Bold denotes an Orioles pitcher

Future Games Legend
Home Game	Away Game

=== Post-season game log ===
Baltimore Orioles 2024 Post-season Game Log
American League Wild Card Series vs. Royals (0–2)

#	Date	Opponent	Score	Win	Loss	Save	Attendance	Series	Box
1	October 1	Royals	0–1	Ragans (1–0)	**Burnes** (0–1)	Erceg (1)	41,506	0–1	L1
2	October 2	Royals	1–2	Zerpa (1–0)	**Pérez** (0–1)	Erceg (2)	38,698	0–2	L2

=== Postseason rosters ===
Playoff rosters
American League Wild Card Series

- Pitchers: 24 Zach Eflin 37 Cade Povich 39 Corbin Burnes 45 Keegan Akin 54 Danny Coulombe 56 Seranthony Domínguez 58 Cionel Pérez 60 Colin Selby 64 Dean Kremer 65 Gregory Soto 71 Jacob Webb 78 Yennier Canó
- Catchers: 27 James McCann 35 Adley Rutschman
- Infielders: 2 Gunnar Henderson 6 Ryan Mountcastle 7 Jackson Holliday 11 Jordan Westburg 26 Emmanuel Rivera 29 Ramón Urías 32 Ryan O'Hearn
- Outfielders: 13 Heston Kjerstad 15 Austin Slater 17 Colton Cowser 25 Anthony Santander 31 Cedric Mullins

== Roster ==
2024 Baltimore Orioles
Roster
Pitchers: 45 Keegan Akin; 43 Bryan Baker; 53 Mike Baumann; 51 Matt Bowman; 38 Kyle Bradish; 39 Corbin Burnes; 78 Yennier Canó; 54 Danny Coulombe; 67 Tucker Davidson; 56 Seranthony Domínguez; 24 Zach Eflin; 52 Jonathan Heasley; 19 Cole Irvin; 46 Craig Kimbrel; 64 Dean Kremer; 66 Matt Krook; 60 Chayce McDermott; 47 John Means; 67 Vinny Nittoli; 58 Cionel Pérez; 37 Cade Povich; 48 Yohan Ramírez; 30 Grayson Rodriguez; 28 Trevor Rogers; 60 Colin Selby; 40 Burch Smith; 65 Gregory Soto; 49 Albert Suárez; 55 Dillon Tate; 79 Nick Vespi; 40 Thyago Vieira; 71 Jacob Webb; 68 Tyler Wells	Catchers: 27 James McCann; 35 Adley Rutschman; Infielders: 2 Gunnar Henderson; 7 Jackson Holliday; 12 Tony Kemp; 3 Jorge Mateo; 63 Nick Maton; 16 Coby Mayo; 6 Ryan Mountcastle; 12 Connor Norby; 32 Ryan O'Hearn; 26 Emmanuel Rivera; 73 Liván Soto; 29 Ramón Urías; 11 Jordan Westburg	Outfielders: 17 Colton Cowser; 21 Austin Hays; 53 Daniel Johnson; 13 Heston Kjerstad; 26 Ryan McKenna; 31 Cedric Mullins; 26 Cristian Pache; 25 Anthony Santander; 15 Austin Slater; 28 Kyle Stowers; Other batters: 91 David Bañuelos; 72 Eloy Jiménez	Manager: 18 Brandon Hyde; Coaches: 92 Grant Anders (development); 61 Cody Asche (offensive strategy); 62 Matt Borgschulte (co-hitting); 70 Tim Cossins (field coordinator/catching); 75 Drew French (pitching); 72 Ryan Fuller (co-hitting); 57 Fredi González (bench); 59 José Hernández (coach); 89 Ryan Klimek (pitching strategy); 36 Tony Mansolino (third base); 77 Mitch Plassmeyer (assistant pitching); 9 Anthony Sanders (first base)

== Player stats ==
= Indicates team leader

=== Batting ===
Note: G = Games played; AB = At bats; R = Runs scored; H = Hits; 2B = Doubles; 3B = Triples; HR = Home runs; RBI = Runs batted in; SB = Stolen bases; BB = Walks; AVG = Batting average; SLG = Slugging average

Player	G	AB	R	H	2B	3B	HR	RBI	SB	BB	AVG	SLG
Gunnar Henderson	159	630	118	177	31	7	37	92	21	78	.281	.529
Anthony Santander	155	595	91	140	25	2	44	102	2	58	.235	.506
Adley Rutschman	148	571	68	143	21	1	19	79	1	58	.250	.391
Colton Cowser	153	499	77	121	24	3	24	69	9	52	.242	.447
Ryan Mountcastle	124	473	54	128	30	2	13	63	3	27	.271	.425
Cedric Mullins	147	444	69	104	16	3	18	54	32	41	.234	.405
Ryan O'Hearn	142	443	60	117	21	3	15	59	3	46	.264	.427
Jordan Westburg	107	416	57	110	26	5	18	63	6	22	.264	.481
Ramón Urías	100	272	39	69	9	2	11	37	1	23	.254	.423
James McCann	65	214	27	50	9	0	8	31	1	13	.234	.388
Jorge Mateo	68	192	30	44	14	2	5	18	13	10	.229	.401
Jackson Holliday	60	190	28	36	4	2	5	23	4	15	.189	.311
Austin Hays	63	157	18	40	13	0	3	14	0	9	.255	.395
Heston Kjerstad	39	99	8	25	2	0	4	14	1	10	.253	.394
Eloy Jiménez	33	95	7	22	5	0	1	7	0	4	.232	.316
Austin Slater	33	69	10	17	3	0	1	6	1	8	.246	.333
Emmanuel Rivera	27	64	9	20	3	1	4	14	0	6	.313	.578
Coby Mayo	17	41	4	4	0	0	0	0	0	4	.098	.098
Kyle Stowers	19	36	3	11	4	0	1	9	0	0	.306	.500
Connor Norby	9	32	3	6	1	0	2	3	0	0	.188	.406
Liván Soto	12	10	1	3	1	0	0	0	0	3	.300	.400
Tony Kemp	5	9	1	0	0	0	0	0	0	1	.000	.000
Ryan McKenna	9	8	3	3	0	0	2	2	0	1	.375	1.125
Nick Maton	5	5	0	0	0	0	0	0	0	0	.000	.000
Daniel Johnson	1	1	1	0	0	0	0	0	0	0	.000	.000
David Bañuelos	1	1	0	0	0	0	0	0	0	0	.000	.000
Cristian Pache	3	1	0	1	0	0	0	0	0	0	1.000	1.000
Team totals	162	5567	786	1391	262	33	235	759	98	489	.250	.435

Source:Baseball Reference

=== Pitching ===
Note: W = Wins; L = Losses; ERA = Earned run average; G = Games pitched; GS = Games started; SV = Saves; IP = Innings pitched; H = Hits allowed; R = Runs allowed; ER = Earned runs allowed; BB = Walks allowed; SO = Strikeouts

Player	W	L	ERA	G	GS	SV	IP	H	R	ER	BB	SO
Corbin Burnes	15	9	2.92	32	32	0	194.1	165	76	63	48	181
Albert Suárez	9	7	3.70	32	24	0	133.2	130	56	55	43	108
Dean Kremer	8	10	4.10	24	24	0	129.2	110	72	59	51	123
Grayson Rodriguez	13	4	3.86	20	20	0	116.2	109	52	50	36	130
Cole Irvin	6	5	4.86	25	16	1	107.1	126	66	58	25	76
Cade Povich	3	9	5.20	16	16	0	79.2	80	49	46	34	69
Keegan Akin	3	1	3.32	66	0	1	78.2	55	31	29	19	97
Yennier Canó	4	3	3.15	70	0	5	60.0	54	24	21	24	65
Jacob Webb	2	5	3.02	60	0	2	56.2	40	23	19	27	58
Zach Eflin	5	2	2.60	9	9	0	55.1	51	16	16	11	47
Cionel Pérez	2	0	4.53	62	0	2	53.2	47	29	27	28	46
Craig Kimbrel	7	5	5.33	57	0	23	52.1	40	35	31	31	73
Kyle Bradish	2	0	2.75	8	8	0	39.1	27	12	12	15	53
Dillon Tate	2	1	4.59	29	0	1	33.1	38	19	17	9	23
Danny Coulombe	1	0	2.12	33	0	1	29.2	15	7	7	5	32
Burch Smith	2	1	5.74	25	0	0	26.2	25	19	17	3	23
Bryan Baker	1	1	5.01	19	0	0	23.1	20	14	13	7	23
Seranthony Domínguez	0	2	3.97	25	0	10	22.2	20	10	10	9	28
John Means	2	0	2.61	4	4	0	20.2	16	6	6	2	16
Trevor Rogers	0	2	7.11	4	4	0	19.0	25	16	15	10	12
Mike Baumann	1	0	3.44	17	0	0	18.1	18	9	7	9	16
Gregory Soto	1	1	5.09	23	0	0	17.2	20	11	10	7	21
Matt Bowman	1	0	3.45	15	1	0	15.2	15	6	6	6	14
Tyler Wells	0	2	5.87	3	3	0	15.1	18	11	10	3	13
Nick Vespi	0	0	2.92	11	0	0	12.1	10	4	4	3	9
Yohan Ramírez	0	0	6.00	5	0	0	6.0	3	4	4	2	6
Jonathan Heasley	0	1	16.88	4	0	0	5.1	10	11	10	3	4
Tucker Davidson	1	0	0.00	1	0	0	4.2	4	0	0	2	1
Colin Selby	0	0	0.00	3	0	0	4.0	1	0	0	2	1
Chayce McDermott	0	0	6.75	1	1	0	4.0	5	3	3	2	3
Vinny Nittoli	0	0	0.00	2	0	0	4.0	2	0	0	0	3
Matt Krook	0	0	18.00	1	0	0	1.0	1	3	2	1	2
James McCann	0	0	18.00	1	0	0	1.0	2	2	2	0	0
Thyago Vieira	0	0	inf	1	0	0	0.0	1	3	3	4	0
Team totals	91	71	3.94	162	162	46	1442.0	1303	699	632	481	1380

Source:Baseball Reference

== Farm system ==
Level	Team	League	Manager
Triple-A	Norfolk Tides	International League	Buck Britton
Double-A	Bowie Baysox	Eastern League	Roberto Mercado
High-A	Aberdeen IronBirds	South Atlantic League	Felipe Rojas Alou Jr.
Low-A	Delmarva Shorebirds	Carolina League	Collin Woody
Rookie	FCL Orioles	Florida Complex League	Christian Frias
Foreign Rookie	DSL Orioles 1	Dominican Summer League	Elvis Morel
Foreign Rookie	DSL Orioles 2	Dominican Summer League	Chris Madera
