= Juan Núñez (baseball) =

Dominican baseball player (born 2000)

Free agent
- Pitcher
- Born: December 7, 2000 (age 25); Azua, Dominican Republic
- Bats: Right Throws: Right

Juan Antonio Núñez (born December 7, 2000) is a Dominican professional baseball pitcher who is a free agent.

== Career ==
=== Minnesota Twins ===
On November 14, 2019, Núñez signed with the Minnesota Twins as an international free agent. He did not play in a game in 2020 due to the cancellation of the minor league season because of the COVID-19 pandemic. Núñez made his professional debut in 2021 with the Dominican Summer League Twins, posting a 2–4 record and 2.14 ERA with 62 strikeouts across 11 games (10 starts). He began the 2022 campaign with the rookie-level Florida Complex League Twins, logging a 4.85 ERA in 8 games (7 starts).

=== Baltimore Orioles ===
On August 2, 2022, the Twins traded Núñez, Cade Povich, Yennier Canó, and Juan Rojas to the Baltimore Orioles in exchange for Jorge López. He split the remainder of the season with the rookie-level Florida Complex League Orioles and Single-A Delmarva Shorebirds.

Núñez split the 2023 campaign between Delmarva and the High-A Aberdeen IronBirds. In 26 games (19 starts) split between the two affiliates, he compiled an 0–6 record and 3.96 ERA with 125 strikeouts and two saves across 104 2/3 innings pitched. Núñez returned to Aberdeen in 2024, but struggled with injury, posting a 2.45 ERA with 38 strikeouts in seven games (four starts).

On December 11, 2024, the San Diego Padres selected Núñez from the Orioles in the Rule 5 draft. On March 25, 2025, Núñez was returned to the Orioles organization. He made eight appearances (three starts) for the Double-A Chesapeake Baysox, struggling to an 0–1 record and 7.07 ERA with 26 strikeouts over 14 innings of work.

Núñez made only two starts (one each) for Delmarva and the FCL Orioles in 2026, struggling to a 9.00 ERA with four strikeouts across two innings pitched. Núñez was released by the Orioles organization on August 31, 2026.
