= Robert Corniel =

Dominican baseball player (born 1995)

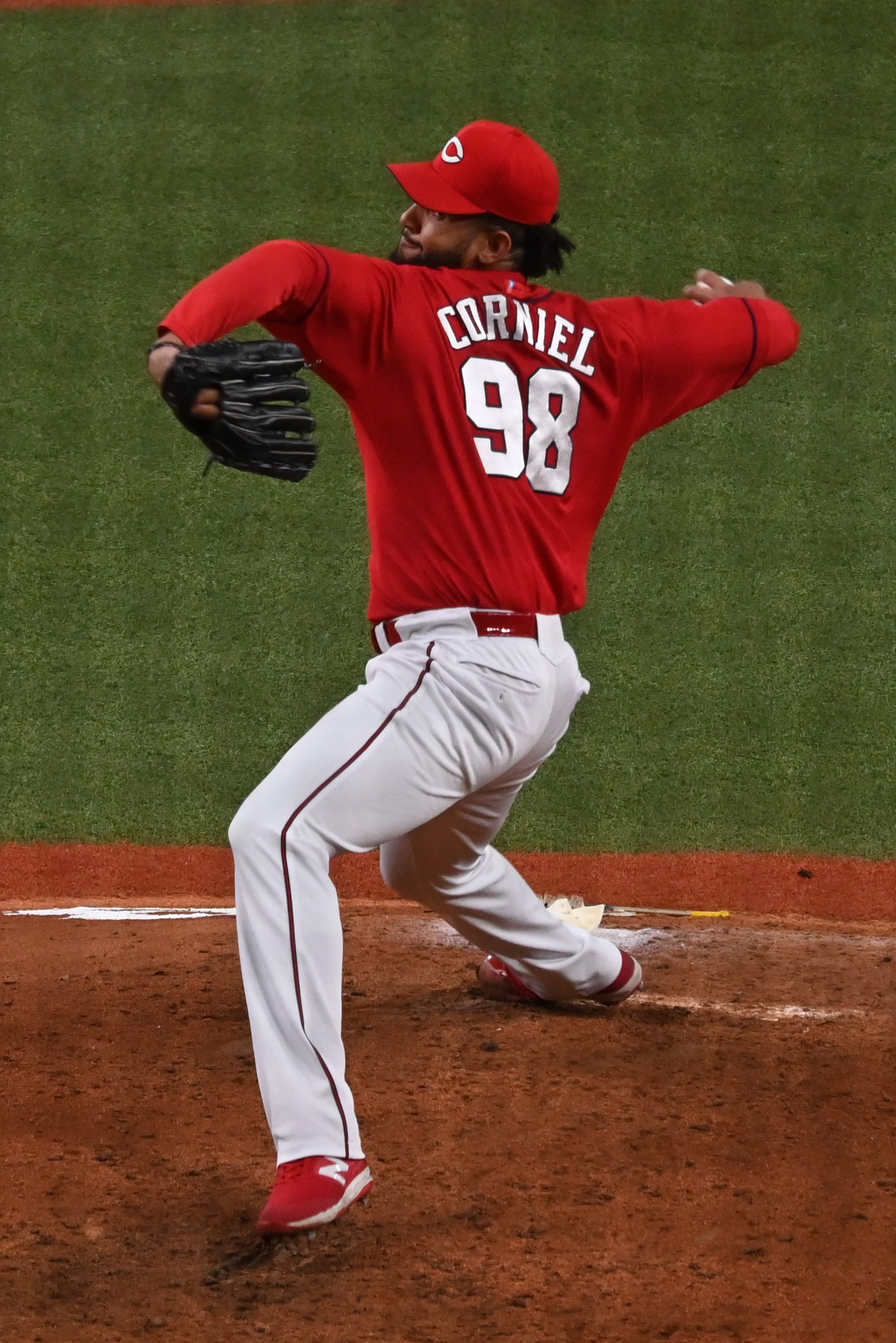
- Corniel with the Hiroshima Toyo Carp in 2021

Free agent
- Pitcher
- Born: June 23, 1995 (age 31); Santiago de los Caballeros, Dominican Republic
- Bats: Right Throws: Right

NPB debut
- April 1, 2021, for the Hiroshima Toyo Carp

NPB statistics (through 2024 season)
- Win–loss record: 2–6
- Earned run average: 4.04
- Strikeouts: 135
- Stats at Baseball Reference

Teams
- Hiroshima Toyo Carp (2021–2024)

Robert Corniel (born June 23, 1995) is a Dominican professional baseball pitcher who is a free agent. He has previously played in Nippon Professional Baseball (NPB) for the Hiroshima Toyo Carp.

== Career ==
=== Houston Astros ===
On July 16, 2012, Corniel signed with the Houston Astros as an international free agent. He spent his first professional season split between the Dominican Summer League Astros and rookie–level Gulf Coast Astros, posting a cumulative 4.50 ERA with 9 strikeouts in 8 innings pitched across 10 appearances.

Corniel missed the 2014 season due to an injury. He returned to action in 2015 with the DSL Astros, recording a 5.27 ERA with 13 strikeouts in 13 2/3 innings pitched across 8 games (1 start). He spent the 2016 season with the team as well, appearing in 18 games and posting a 3.00 ERA with 29 strikeouts in 36 innings pitched.

Corniel split the 2017 season with the Low–A Tri-City ValleyCats and Single–A Quad Cities River Bandits, registering a cumulative 4.15 ERA with 36 strikeouts and 2 saves in 34 2/3 innings pitched across 18 games. In 2018, he pitched in 15 games split between Quad Cities and the High–A Buies Creek Astros, but struggled to a 6.16 ERA with 28 strikeouts in 19 innings of work. On June 15, 2018, Corniel was released by the Astros organization.

=== Hiroshima Toyo Carp ===
On September 29, 2020, Corniel signed with the Hiroshima Toyo Carp of Nippon Professional Baseball (NPB). Corniel made his NPB debut on April 1, 2021. On June 20, Corniel tied Shohei Ohtani for the fastest recorded pitch in NPB history (102.5 mph). The record was later broken on August 13 by Thyago Vieira of the Yomiuri Giants, who recorded a pitch that clocked in at 103.1 mph. In 50 appearances for the team, he posted a 1–2 record and 3.82 ERA with 79 strikeouts in 61 1/3 innings pitched. In 2022, Corniel made 12 appearances for the Carp, recording a 3.52 ERA with 19 strikeouts in 15 1/3 innings of work.

Corniel pitched in 8 games for the Carp in 2023, logging a 1–4 record and 5.10 ERA with 23 strikeouts in 42 1/3 innings pitched. Corniel made 16 appearances for Hiroshima in 2024, recording a 2.65 ERA with 14 strikeouts across 17 innings pitched. On November 25, 2024, the Carp announced they would not bring back Corniel in 2025, making him a free agent.

=== Bravos de León ===
On April 14, 2026, Corniel signed with the Bravos de León of the Mexican League. In eight relief appearances, he struggled to an 11.81 ERA, striking out three batters across 5 1/3 innings pitched. On May 4, Corniel was released by León.
