= Liván Soto =

Dominican baseball player (born 2000)

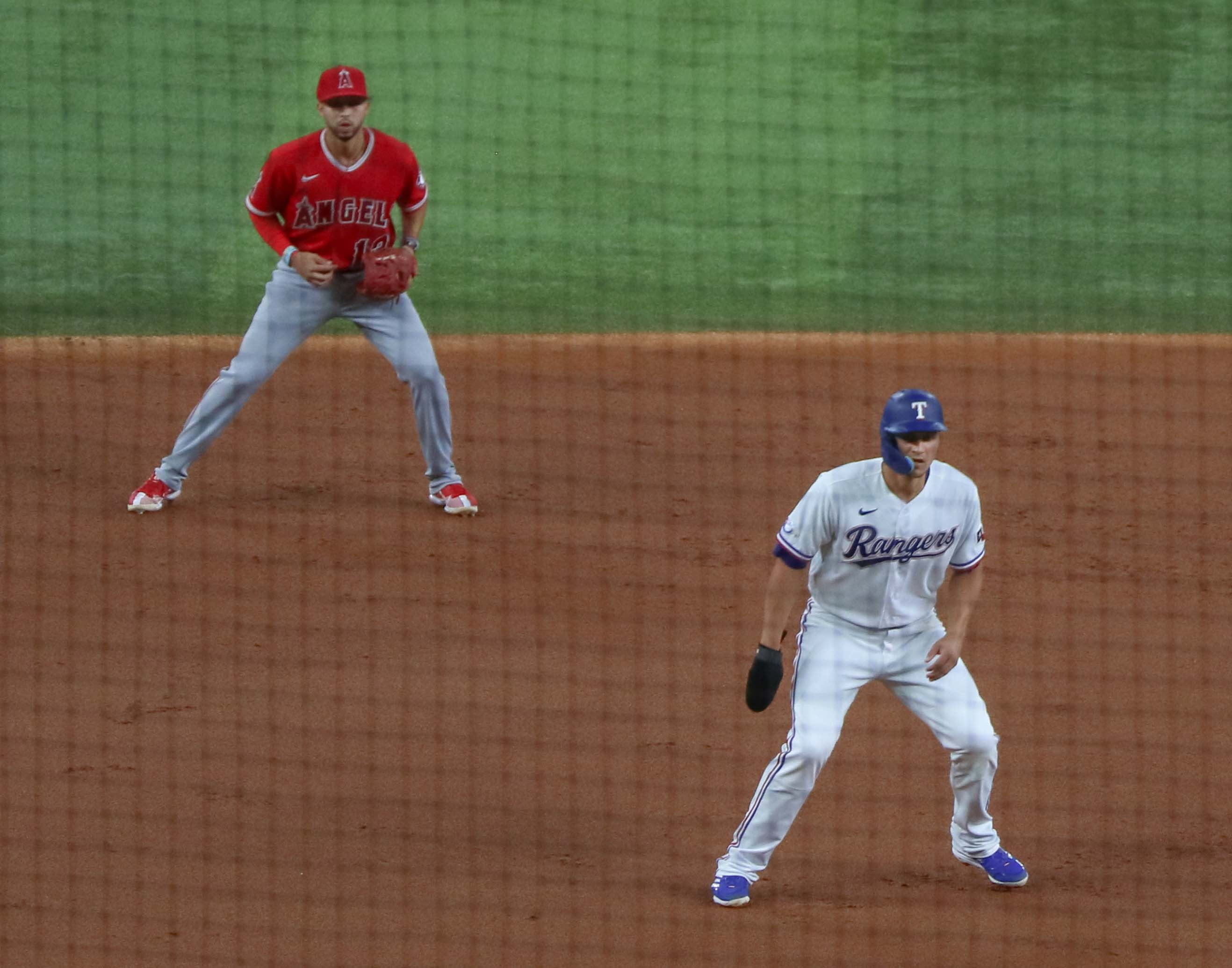
- Soto pictured with Corey Seager during a game on September 20, 2022

Caciques de Distrito – No. 19
- Shortstop / Second baseman
- Born: June 22, 2000 (age 26); Valencia, Venezuela
- Bats: Left Throws: Right

MLB debut
- September 17, 2022, for the Los Angeles Angels

MLB statistics (through 2024 season)
- Batting average: .351
- Home runs: 1
- Runs batted in: 9
- Stats at Baseball Reference

Teams
- Los Angeles Angels (2022–2023); Cincinnati Reds (2024); Baltimore Orioles (2024)

Liván Enrique Soto (born June 22, 2000) is a Venezuelan professional baseball shortstop and second baseman for the Caciques de Distrito of the Venezuelan Major League. He has previously played in Major League Baseball (MLB) for the Los Angeles Angels, Cincinnati Reds, and Baltimore Orioles.

== Professional career ==
=== Atlanta Braves ===
Soto signed with the Atlanta Braves on July 2, 2016, as an international free agent. He made his professional debut for the Gulf Coast League Braves in 2017, appearing in 47 games and ending the season with a .225 batting average. He was granted free agency on November 21, 2017, after Major League Baseball voided the contracts of nine Braves' minor league players after the league announced the Braves had violated international signing rules from 2015 to 2017.

=== Los Angeles Angels ===
On December 15, 2017, Soto signed a minor league contract with the Los Angeles Angels organization. He spent the 2018 season with the Orem Owlz of the Pioneer League. He split the 2019 season with the AZL Angels and the Burlington Bees. Soto did not play in a game in 2020 due to cancellation of the minor league season because of the COVID-19 pandemic.

In 2021, he advanced to the Single-A and Double-A levels, appearing with the Tri-City Dust Devils and Rocket City Trash Pandas. Soto began the 2022 season with Rocket City and was named the Southern League Player of the Week on July 11 after going 11-for-21 in six games. At the time, he was leading the league in hits and among the league leaders in batting average and on-base percentage.

On September 17, 2022, Soto was selected to the 40-man roster and promoted to the major leagues for the first time. The following day against the Seattle Mariners, Soto collected his first career hit and home run, with both coming off of Seattle starter Marco Gonzales. Soto appeared in 18 games for the Angels in his rookie campaign, slashing an excellent .400/.414/.582 with one home run and nine RBI. Soto was optioned to the Triple-A Salt Lake Bees to begin the 2023 season. He played in only four games for the Angels in 2023, going 2–for–9 (.222) with three walks.

On February 3, 2024, Soto was designated for assignment by the Angels to open a spot on the 40-man roster for newly signed José Cisnero and on February 8, he was claimed off waivers by the Baltimore Orioles. He was designated for assignment by the Orioles on February 16 and returned to the Angels via another waiver claim on February 18. Soto was optioned to Triple–A Salt Lake to begin the 2024 season. He was once more designated for assignment by the Angels on April 8.

=== Baltimore Orioles ===
On April 11, 2024, Soto was claimed off waivers by the Baltimore Orioles. He appeared in one game for the Triple–A Norfolk Tides, going 2–for–4 (.500) with a home run and two RBI. Soto was designated for assignment on April 16, following the promotion of David Bañuelos.

=== Cincinnati Reds ===
On April 19, 2024, Soto was claimed off waivers by the Cincinnati Reds. He appeared in only one game for Cincinnati, and was designated for assignment by the Reds on July 30.

=== Baltimore Orioles (second stint) ===
On July 30, 2024, the Reds traded Soto, outfielder Austin Slater, and cash considerations to the Baltimore Orioles in exchange for cash considerations or a player to be named later. In 12 games for the Orioles, he went 3-for-10 (.300) with 3 walks.

Soto was designated for assignment following the acquisition of Roansy Contreras on January 10, 2025. He cleared waivers and was sent outright to the Triple-A Norfolk Tides on January 17. In 99 appearances split between Norfolk and the Single-A Delmarva Shorebirds, Soto batted a combined .194/.305/.256 with five home runs, 31 RBI, and three stolen bases. Soto elected free agency following the season on November 6.

=== Caciques de Distrito ===
On April 3, 2026, Soto signed with the Caciques de Distrito of the Venezuelan Major League.
