= Thyago Vieira =

Brazilian baseball player (born 1993)

Guerreros de Oaxaca – No. 11
- Pitcher
- Born: 7 January 1993 (age 33); São Paulo, Brazil
- Bats: Right Throws: Right

Professional debut
- MLB: August 14, 2017, for the Seattle Mariners
- NPB: June 19, 2020, for the Yomiuri Giants

MLB statistics (through 2024 season)
- Win–loss record: 2–3
- Earned run average: 5.81
- Strikeouts: 65

NPB statistics (through 2022 season)
- Win–loss record: 0–6
- Earned run average: 3.61
- Strikeouts: 101
- Stats at Baseball Reference

Teams
- Seattle Mariners (2017); Chicago White Sox (2018–2019); Yomiuri Giants (2020–2022); Milwaukee Brewers (2023–2024); Baltimore Orioles (2024); Arizona Diamondbacks (2024)

Career highlights and awards
- NPB All-Star (2021)

Thyago Vieira Lucio (born 7 January 1993) is a Brazilian professional baseball pitcher for the Guerreros de Oaxaca of the Mexican League. He has previously played in Major League Baseball (MLB) for the Seattle Mariners, Chicago White Sox, Milwaukee Brewers, and Baltimore Orioles, and in Nippon Professional Baseball (NPB) for the Yomiuri Giants.

== Career ==
=== Seattle Mariners ===
On 20 November 2010, Vieira signed with the Seattle Mariners organization as an international free agent for $65,000. At the time of his signing, he was the second Brazilian-born pitcher to reach the Major Leagues. The first Brazilian pitcher to reach MLB was André Rienzo in Chicago White Sox (2006). Thyago made his professional debut with the Venezuelan Summer League (VSL) Mariners, pitching to a 4.00 earned run average (ERA) in 12 games. He returned to the VSL Mariners the next year, logging a 3–5 win–loss record and 6.05 ERA in 55 innings of work. In 2013, Vieira played for the Low-A Everett AquaSox, pitching to a 4–5 record and 3.84 ERA with 51 strikeouts in 68 innings of work. In 2014, Vieira played for the Single-A Clinton LumberKings, recording a 1–1 record and 5.23 ERA in 13 games. He returned to Clinton for the 2015 season, and accrued a 1–4 record and 6.97 ERA in 22 appearances for the team. After an extended spring training in 2016, he joined the High-A Bakersfield Blaze as a reliever, where he worked extensively with pitching coach Ethan Katz. During that year, he registered a 2.84 ERA with 53 strikeouts in 44 1/3 innings pitched. His fastball was recorded at up to 103 miles per hour (166 km/h) in 2016.

The Mariners added Vieira to their 40-man roster after the 2016 season. He began the 2017 season with the Double-A Arkansas Travelers, and also played for the Triple-A Tacoma Rainiers, logging a 4.00 ERA in 41 appearances between the two clubs. Vieira was promoted to the major leagues for the first time on 14 August 2017, and pitched one shutout inning against the Baltimore Orioles before being optioned to Triple-A the next day.

=== Chicago White Sox ===
On 16 November 2017, Vieira was traded to the Chicago White Sox in exchange for international bonus pool money. He was assigned to the Triple-A Charlotte Knights to begin the 2018 season, where he logged a 5.05 ERA in 36 games. In 16 games for Chicago, Vieira pitched to a 7.13 ERA with 15 strikeouts in 16 appearances. In 2019, he struggled to a 9.00 ERA in six big league games, but recorded a better 6–4 record and 5.70 ERA in 39 games for Triple-A Charlotte. Vieira was released on 2 December 2019, in order to allow him to pursue an opportunity in Japan.

=== Yomiuri Giants ===
On 3 December 2019, Vieira signed with the Yomiuri Giants of Nippon Professional Baseball (NPB). In his first NPB season, Vieira had a 3.28 ERA with 29 strikeouts in 24 2/3 innings of work.

On 13 August 2021, Vieira recorded the fastest pitch in NPB history at 166 kilometres per hour (103.1 mph), a record previously held by Shohei Ohtani and Robert Corniel. On 1 September 2021, he set a NPB record for most consecutive mound appearances without giving up a run (32) by a non-Japanese player, breaking a record previously set in 2011 by Brian Falkenborg of the Fukuoka SoftBank Hawks. In 2021, he recorded seven saves and had a 2.76 ERA in 32 2/3 innings with 38 strikeouts and was selected for the Nippon League All Star Game. On 23 December 2021, Vieira re-signed with the Giants for the 2022 season.

On 7 April 2022, following a game in which he had hit Hiroshima Toyo Carp batter Ryan McBroom in the head, Vieira was sent down to Yomiuri's farm team. He had struggled to a 22.50 ERA in 4 appearances at the point of his demotion.

=== Milwaukee Brewers ===
On 12 January 2023, Vieira signed a minor league contract with the Milwaukee Brewers organization. In 33 games for the Triple–A Nashville Sounds, he posted a 3.35 ERA with 51 strikeouts and 8 saves in 37 2/3 innings pitched. On 6 September 2023, Vieira's contract was selected by the Brewers, adding him to the major league roster. He made two scoreless appearances for Milwaukee before the conclusion of the season, compiling two strikeouts in three innings pitched.

Vieira made 16 appearances out of the bullpen for Milwaukee in 2024, but struggled to a 5.64 ERA with 25 strikeouts across 22 1/3 innings of work. He was designated for assignment by the Brewers on 20 May 2024.

=== Baltimore Orioles ===
On 25 May 2024, Vieira and Aneuris Rodriguez were traded to the Baltimore Orioles in exchange for Garrett Stallings. Vieira allowed all five batters he faced to reach base on four walks and a three-run triple in the eighth inning of an 11–3 home win over the Boston Red Sox which was his Orioles debut two days later on 27 May. He was designated for assignment following the promotion of Connor Norby on 3 June.

=== Arizona Diamondbacks ===
On 6 June 2024, Vieira was claimed off waivers by the Arizona Diamondbacks. In 11 appearances for Arizona, he recorded a 2.87 ERA with 14 strikeouts across 15 2/3 innings pitched. Vieira was designated for assignment by the Diamondbacks on 27 July. He cleared waivers and was sent outright to the Triple–A Reno Aces on 2 August.

On 27 February 2025, it was announced that Vieira would require Tommy John surgery and miss the entirety of the 2025 season. He was released by the Diamondbacks on 27 March.

=== El Águila de Veracruz ===
On 15 May 2026, Vieira signed with El Águila de Veracruz of the Mexican League. In 18 appearances for Veracruz, he posted a 1–0 record with a 2.70 ERA, 17 strikeouts, and 10 walks across 20 innings pitched.

=== Guerreros de Oaxaca ===
On 1 July 2026, Vieira was traded to the Guerreros de Oaxaca of the Mexican League.

== International career ==
Vieira represents the Brazilian national team in international competition. At the 2013 World Baseball Classic Qualification, he pitched a scoreless 1.2 innings over two games, both against Panama, to help propel Brazil to its first ever World Baseball Classic berth.

Vieira pitched 1.1 innings over two games at the 2013 World Baseball Classic. He relieved Murilo Gouvea in a group stage game against China with a 2–0 lead, one out and the bases loaded in the bottom of the 8th; Vieira walked Li Lei on four pitches to end the shutout, gave up a two-run single, and hit another batter to load the bases before being relieved. Brazil went on to lose the game, and with it, automatic qualification for the 2017 World Baseball Classic. He finished the tournament with a 13.50 ERA.

At the qualifiers for the 2017 WBC, he pitched a single inning of scoreless relief; however, Brazil did not move on to the main tournament.

Vieira also pitched for Brazil at the 2019 Pan American Games Qualifier.
