= Albert Suárez =

Venezuelan baseball player (born 1989)

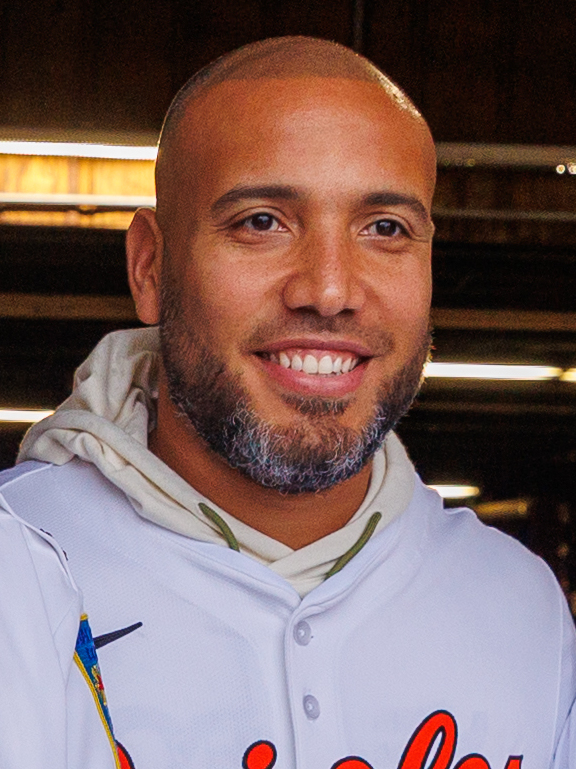
- Suárez with the Baltimore Orioles in 2025

Free agent
- Pitcher
- Born: October 8, 1989 (age 37); San Félix, Venezuela
- Bats: Right Throws: Right

Professional debut
- MLB: May 8, 2016, for the San Francisco Giants
- NPB: April 25, 2019, for the Tokyo Yakult Swallows
- KBO: April 3, 2022, for the Samsung Lions

MLB statistics (through 2026 season)
- Win–loss record: 17–15
- Earned run average: 3.97
- Strikeouts: 252

NPB statistics (through 2021 season)
- Win–loss record: 10–8
- Earned run average: 3.00
- Strikeouts: 134

KBO statistics (through 2023 season)
- Win–loss record: 10–15
- Earned run average: 3.04
- Strikeouts: 247
- Stats at Baseball Reference

Teams
- San Francisco Giants (2016–2017); Tokyo Yakult Swallows (2019–2021); Samsung Lions (2022–2023); Baltimore Orioles (2024–2026)

Career highlights and awards
- Japan Series champion (2021)

Albert Joe Suárez Subero (born October 8, 1989) is a Venezuelan professional baseball pitcher who is a free agent. He has played in Major League Baseball (MLB) for the San Francisco Giants and Baltimore Orioles. He has also played in Nippon Professional Baseball (NPB) for the Tokyo Yakult Swallows and in the KBO League for the Samsung Lions.

== Career ==
=== Tampa Bay Devil Rays ===
On July 2, 2006, Suárez signed with the Tampa Bay Devil Rays organization as an international free agent. Suárez began his professional career in 2008, playing for the rookie-level Princeton Rays and went 0–2 with a 3.92 ERA and 37 strikeouts in 11 games (nine starts). In 2009, he pitched for the Low-A Hudson Valley Renegades, going a combined 1–0 with a 2.79 ERA with 4 strikeouts in two starts. He pitched for the rookie-level Gulf Coast League Rays and the Single-A Bowling Green Hot Rods in 2010, going a combined 2–5 with a 3.38 ERA and 38 strikeouts in 15 games (14 starts).

On November 19, 2010, the Rays added Suárez to their 40-man roster to protect him from the Rule 5 draft. In 2011, he was 1–1 with a 2.15 ERA and 17 strikeouts in eight games split between the GCL Rays and High-A Charlotte Stone Crabs. In 2012, Suárez was 5–9 with a 4.08 ERA and 62 strikeouts in 25 starts for Charlotte. On August 31, 2012, Suárez was designated for assignment by Tampa Bay. He cleared waivers on September 3 and was assigned to Double-A. Suárez made two starts for the Double-A Montgomery Biscuits in 2013, posting a 1.42 ERA. On November 4, 2013, he elected free agency, but quickly re-signed with Tampa Bay on November 12 on a new minor league contract. With Charlotte and Montgomery in 2014, he went a combined 4–6 with a 3.60 ERA and 42 strikeouts in 14 starts.

=== Los Angeles Angels ===
On November 24, 2014, Suárez signed a minor league contract with the Los Angeles Angels of Anaheim that included an invitation to Spring Training. He was assigned to the Double-A Arkansas Travelers to begin the year, and after going 11–9 with a 2.98 ERA and a career-high 121 strikeouts in 27 starts for the team, he earned a 2015 Texas League Mid-Season All-Star selection. Suárez elected free agency following the season on November 6, 2015.

=== San Francisco Giants ===
On November 18, 2015, Suárez signed a minor league contract with the San Francisco Giants organization that included an invitation to major league spring training. He was assigned to the Triple-A Sacramento River Cats to begin the 2016 season. Suárez was 1–2 with a 2.88 ERA in Triple-A when he was promoted to the major leagues for the first time on May 6, 2016.

Suárez made his major league debut on May 8, 2016, pitching one scoreless inning in relief against the Colorado Rockies. Suárez earned his first major league win on May 11, pitching a scoreless top of the 13th inning against the Toronto Blue Jays, escaping a bases-loaded jam by inducing Blue Jays outfielder José Bautista to pop out. Suárez made his first major league start on June 1, 2016, against the Atlanta Braves, allowing 3 runs in 5 innings pitched. In the game, he got his first major league hit and RBI on an infield single off Ian Krol. He finished his rookie season with a 3-5 record and 4.29 ERA in 22 appearances. In 2017, Suárez logged an 0-3 record and a 5.12 ERA with 34 strikeouts in 18 appearances for the Giants. On December 1, 2017, Suárez was non-tendered by the Giants, making him a free agent. However, he subsequently re-signed with the team on a minor league contract on December 10.

=== Arizona Diamondbacks ===
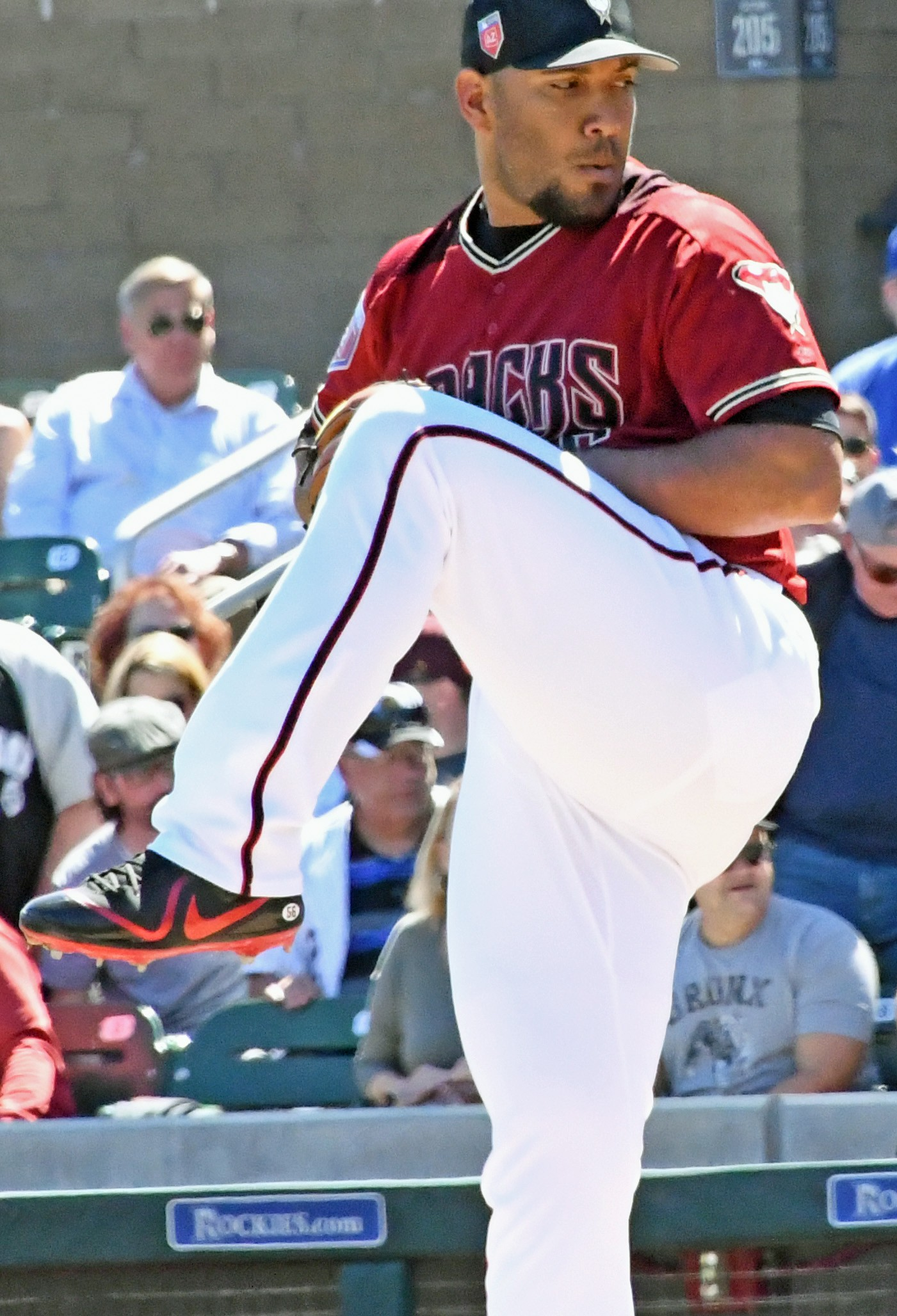
Suárez pitching for the Arizona Diamondbacks in 2018 spring training

On December 14, 2017, Suárez was selected by the Arizona Diamondbacks in the Rule 5 draft. On March 24, 2018, Suárez was designated for assignment by Arizona and was sent outright to the Triple-A Reno Aces after clearing waivers on March 27. He spent the year in Reno, logging a 4.97 ERA with 51 strikeouts in 63 1/3 innings of work. Suárez elected free agency on October 11.

=== Tokyo Yakult Swallows ===
On December 12, 2018, Suárez signed with the Tokyo Yakult Swallows of Nippon Professional Baseball (NPB). He finished his first NPB season with a 1.53 ERA and 12 strikeouts in 4 appearances. The next year, Suárez pitched in 12 games for Yakult, posting a 4-4 record and 2.67 ERA with 52 strikeouts in 67 1/3 innings pitched.

=== Samsung Lions ===
On December 7, 2021, Suárez signed with the Samsung Lions of the KBO League. In 30 games (29 starts) for Samsung in 2022, he registered a 6–8 record and 2.49 ERA with 159 strikeouts in 173 2/3 innings pitched.

On December 7, 2022, Suárez re-signed a one-year $1.3 million contract for the 2023 season. In 2023, he made 19 starts for Samsung, posting a 4–7 record and 3.92 ERA with 88 strikeouts in 108 innings of work. After suffering a left calf injury that ruled him out for a month, Suárez was released by the Lions on August 10, 2023.

=== Baltimore Orioles ===
On September 15, 2023, Suárez signed a minor league contract with the Baltimore Orioles organization. He was assigned to the Triple–A Norfolk Tides to begin the 2024 season. On April 17, 2024, the Orioles added him to their major league roster. He started that day's game and struck out the first batter he faced in the majors since September 26, 2017, en route to 5 2/3 shutout innings. He pitched an additional 5 2/3 shutout innings in a 4–2 away victory over the Los Angeles Angels on April 22, earning his first MLB win since June 23, 2016. The 2,860 days between those two MLB wins is the second-longest since the 1950s, surpassed by only Travis Blackley's 2,906 from 2004 to 2012. Suárez had a streak of three straight scoreless starts which ended when Jose Altuve hit a leadoff homer in the first inning of a 3–2 home victory over the Houston Astros on August 24. He pitched a career-high 133 2/3 innings and finished the regular season at 9–7 with a 3.70 ERA and 108 strikeouts.

Suárez made one appearance for Baltimore before he was placed on the injured list with right shoulder inflammation on March 30, 2025. He was transferred to the 60-day injured list on April 7. Suárez was activated from the injured list on September 1. The next day, he pitched two shutout innings to end a 6–2 away win over the San Diego Padres. Suárez's campaign was abbreviated when he sustained right elbow discomfort during his only start of the season in an 11–2 away loss to the Toronto Blue Jays on September 14, and returned to the injured list the following day. He ended the regular season with a 2–0 record and 2.31 ERA across 11 2/3 innings pitched with 10 strikeouts over five games. On November 21, Suárez was non-tendered by Baltimore and became a free agent.

On December 17, 2025, Suárez re-signed with the Orioles on a minor league contract. On April 1, 2026, after Zach Eflin suffered an elbow injury, the Orioles added Suárez to their major league roster. He made five appearances for Baltimore, recording a 1-0 record and 3.46 ERA with six strikeouts and one save over 13 innings of work. On April 26, Suárez was designated for assignment by the Orioles. He cleared waivers and elected free agency on April 29. However, Suárez re-signed with the Orioles on a new minor league contract on April 30. He had his contract selected back to the active roster on May 1. However, the following day, Suárez was designated for assignment Baltimore. He cleared waivers on May 4 and was sent outright to Norfolk. On May 19, the Orioles selected Suárez's contract for a third time. Suárez was designated for assignment once more on May 24. He elected free agency after clearing waivers on May 27. However, on the following day Suárez re-signed with the Orioles on a major league contract. In 25 total appearances for Baltimore, he logged a 2–0 record and 3.93 ERA with 38 strikeouts and one save over 55 innings of work. Suárez was designated for assignment by the Orioles on August 21. He elected free agency after clearing waivers on August 24. On August 27, Suárez re-signed with the Orioles on a new minor league contract. On September 1, the Orioles selected Suárez's contract after rosters expanded. After two appearances for the team, he was designated for assignment once again on September 6. Suárez elected free agency after clearing waivers three days later. On September 12, Suárez re–signed with Baltimore on another minor league contract. On October 31, he was sent outright to Triple-A Norfolk Tides.

== Personal life ==
His brother, Robert Suárez, is also a pitcher in MLB.

== See also ==
- List of players from Venezuela in Major League Baseball
- Rule 5 draft results
