= Jorge López (baseball) =

Puerto Rican baseball player (born 1993)

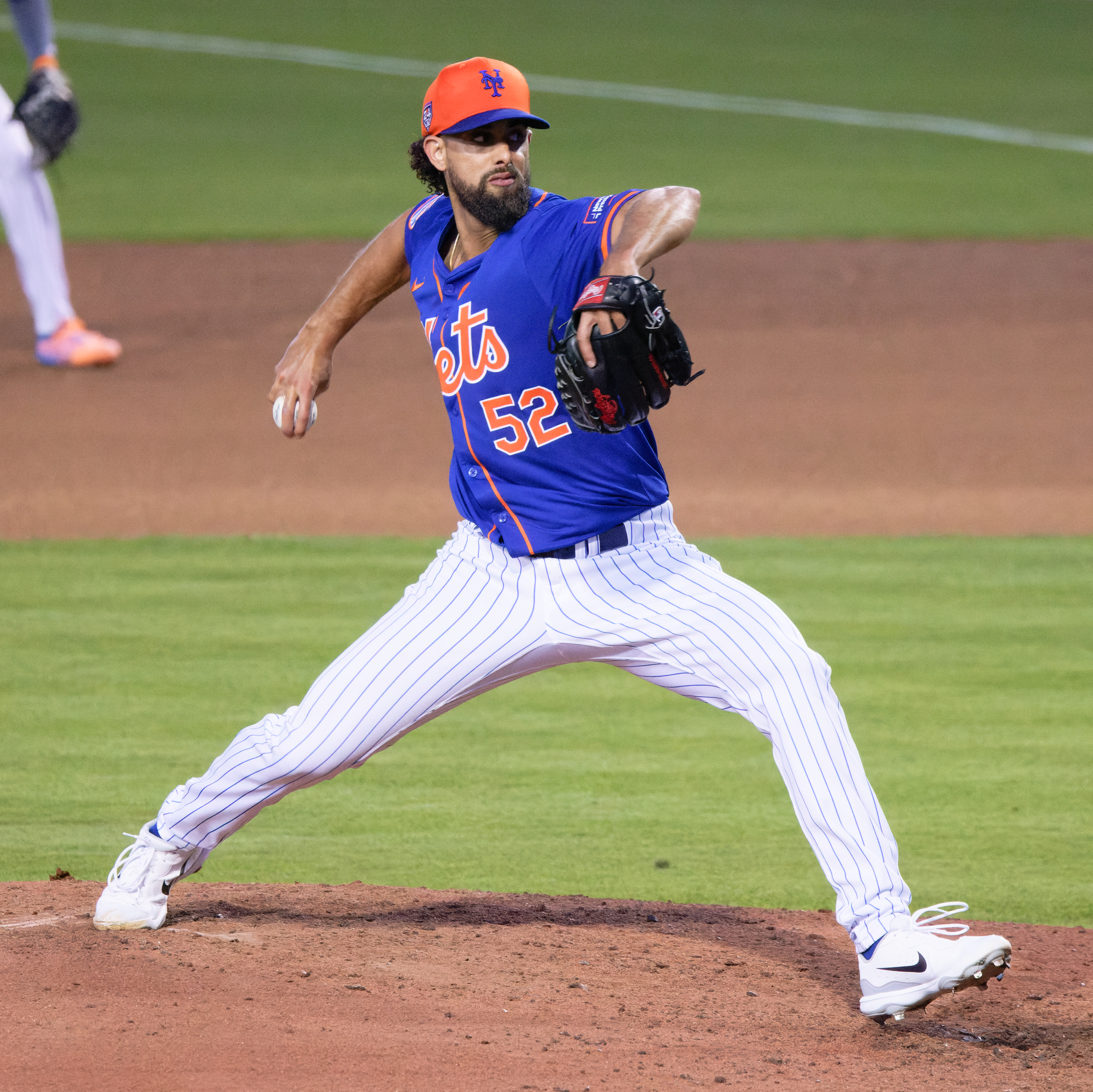
- López with the Mets in 2024

Saraperos de Saltillo – No. 32
- Pitcher
- Born: February 10, 1993 (age 33); Cayey, Puerto Rico
- Bats: Right Throws: Right

MLB debut
- September 29, 2015, for the Milwaukee Brewers

MLB statistics (through 2025 season)
- Win–loss record: 30–43
- Earned run average: 5.31
- Strikeouts: 485
- Saves: 32
- Stats at Baseball Reference

Teams
- Milwaukee Brewers (2015, 2017–2018); Kansas City Royals (2018–2020); Baltimore Orioles (2020–2022); Minnesota Twins (2022–2023); Miami Marlins (2023); Baltimore Orioles (2023); New York Mets (2024); Chicago Cubs (2024); Washington Nationals (2025)

Career highlights and awards
- All-Star (2022)
Medals
Men's baseball
Representing Puerto Rico
World Baseball Classic
Silver medal – second place	2017 Los Angeles	Team

Jorge Yabiel López Ramos (born February 10, 1993) is a Puerto Rican professional baseball pitcher for the Saraperos de Saltillo of the Mexican League. He has previously played in Major League Baseball (MLB) for the Milwaukee Brewers, Kansas City Royals, Baltimore Orioles, Minnesota Twins, Miami Marlins, New York Mets, Chicago Cubs, and Washington Nationals. He made his MLB debut in 2015 and was an All-Star in 2022.

== Professional career ==
=== Milwaukee Brewers ===
The Milwaukee Brewers selected López in the second round of the 2011 Major League Baseball draft out of the Caguas Military Academy in Caguas, Puerto Rico. He signed with the Brewers and made his professional debut with the Arizona League Brewers. He spent 2012 with the Dominican Summer League Brewers and Gulf Coast Brewers and 2013 with the Wisconsin Timber Rattlers. In 2014, López pitched for the Brevard County Manatees. In July he was selected to appear in the All-Star Futures Game. In 2015, he played for the Biloxi Shuckers of the Double–A Southern League. He had a 12–5 win–loss record, a 2.26 earned run average (ERA), and 137 strikeouts in 143 1/3 innings pitched for Biloxi. López was named the Brewers' minor league pitcher of the year and Southern League's most outstanding pitcher.

After Biloxi's 2015 season ended, the Brewers promoted López to the major leagues. He made his major league debut on September 29, 2015. In 2016, López began the season with the Colorado Springs Sky Sox of the Triple–A Pacific Coast League, but struggled, pitching to a 6.81 ERA in 17 games started. He was demoted to Biloxi. López pitched for the Puerto Rican national baseball team in the 2017 World Baseball Classic. In the 2017 season, López returned to Biloxi. He pitched to a 4.61 ERA as a starting pitcher, and then became a relief pitcher, and had a 3.62 ERA in that role. He made one appearance for the Brewers in 2017, pitching two innings and allowing one run on four hits on June 29.

During the 2017–18 offseason, López pitched for the Águilas Cibaeñas of the Dominican Professional Baseball League. López began the 2018 season with Colorado Springs. The Brewers again promoted him to the major leagues on April 11. He made one appearance, on April 16, before being returned to Colorado Springs on April 17.

=== Kansas City Royals ===
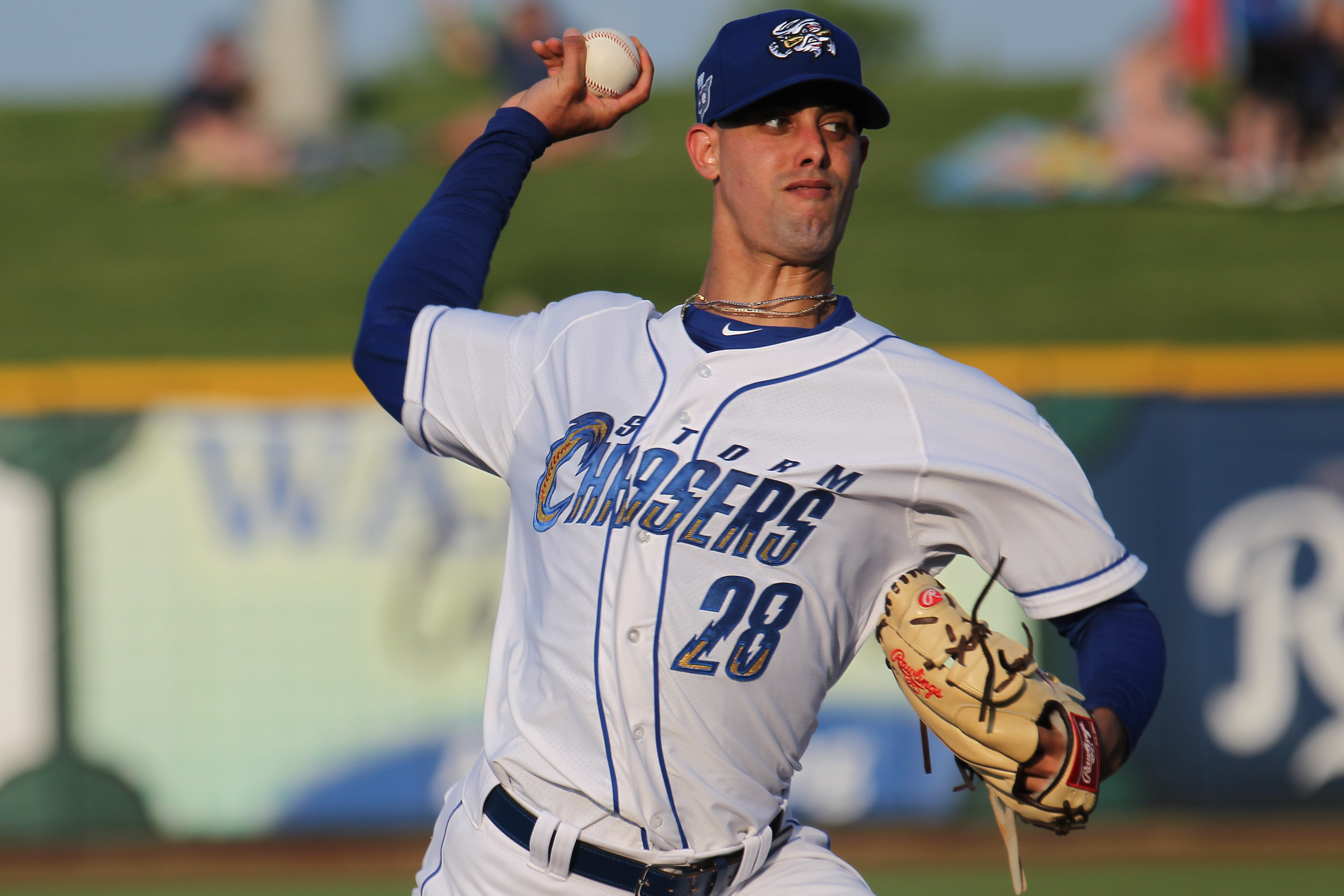
López with the Omaha Storm Chasers in 2018

On July 27, 2018, López, along with teammate Brett Phillips, was traded to the Kansas City Royals for Mike Moustakas. On September 8, in his seventh major league start, López flirted with a perfect game as he retired 24 consecutive Minnesota Twins batters in order over eight innings. In the ninth inning, López surrendered a leadoff walk to Max Kepler and a hit to Robbie Grossman before walking off the mound at Target Field to a standing ovation. He became the first pitcher in Royals history to bring a perfect game into the ninth inning, besting Bret Saberhagen's seven-inning attempt vs. the Seattle Mariners. He was designated for assignment on August 7, 2020.

=== Baltimore Orioles ===
On August 9, 2020, the Baltimore Orioles claimed López off of waivers. López ended the 2020 season with a 6.69 ERA and 28 strikeouts to partner with a 2–2 record over 10 appearances. On August 21, 2021, after going 3–14 with a 6.35 ERA in 25 starts, Lopez was moved to the bullpen.

In 2022, the Orioles shifted López into the closer role. After pitching to a 1.62 ERA with 17 saves in 40 games during the first half of the season, López represented the Orioles at the 2022 Major League Baseball All-Star Game.

=== Minnesota Twins ===
On August 2, 2022, the Orioles traded López to the Minnesota Twins in exchange for minor league pitching prospects Cade Povich, Yennier Canó, Juan Núñez, and Juan Rojas.

On January 13, 2023, López agreed to a one-year, $3.525 million contract with the Twins, avoiding salary arbitration.

=== Miami Marlins ===
On July 26, 2023, López was traded to the Miami Marlins in exchange for Dylan Floro. In 12 appearances for the Marlins, he struggled immensely to a 9.26 ERA with 8 strikeouts in 11 2/3 innings pitched. On September 2, he was optioned to the Triple–A Jacksonville Jumbo Shrimp after Johnny Cueto was activated from the injured list.

=== Baltimore Orioles (second stint) ===
On September 2, 2023, López was claimed off waivers by the Baltimore Orioles. In 12 appearances for Baltimore, he posted a 5.25 ERA with 14 strikeouts in 12 innings pitched. On September 30, López was designated for assignment by the Orioles. He cleared waivers and elected free agency on October 5, 2023.

=== New York Mets ===
On December 14, 2023, López signed a one-year, $2 million contract with the New York Mets. On May 29, 2024, López was ejected in the eighth inning of a 10–3 loss to the Los Angeles Dodgers by the third base umpire. While walking off the field, he threw his glove into the stands and untucked his shirt. In a postgame interview, López seemingly called the Mets "the worst team in all of fucking MLB." However, López clarified he said "the worst teammate in the entire league." He was designated for assignment by the Mets the next day. On June 5, López was released by the team. In 28 games for the Mets, he compiled a 3.76 ERA with 19 strikeouts across 26 1/3 innings pitched.

=== Chicago Cubs ===
On June 11, 2024, López signed a minor league contract with the Chicago Cubs. He made three scoreless appearances for the Triple–A Iowa Cubs, striking out one batter in 2 2/3 innings. On June 28, the Cubs selected López's contract, adding him to their major league roster. On November 1, López elected to become a free agent.

=== Washington Nationals ===
On January 11, 2025, López signed a one-year, $3 million contract with the Washington Nationals. On April 16, López was ejected from a game against the Pittsburgh Pirates after throwing an up-and-in pitch at Andrew McCutchen that nearly hit the batter's head. He was subsequently suspended for three games.

During an appearance against the Seattle Mariners on May 29, López yelled at home plate umpire Andy Fletcher during an at-bat, after Fletcher called a ball on a close pitch. Manager Dave Martinez went out to the mound to calm López down, but López struggled through the rest of the inning, giving up the lead before the Nationals came back to win the game. Two days later, the Nationals designated López for assignment. In a news conference regarding the decision, Martinez explained that Washington wasn't "the right fit" for López and he wanted to focus on developing younger pitchers. López was released by the Nationals after clearing waivers on June 3.

=== Saraperos de Saltillo ===
On March 23, 2026, López signed with the Saraperos de Saltillo of the Mexican League.

== Personal life ==
López and his wife, Karla, have a son, Mikael. Their son has suffered from familial Mediterranean fever since birth, and is waiting for an intestinal transplant. They had to leave their town of Cayey due to Hurricane Maria in 2017.

== See also ==
- List of Major League Baseball players from Puerto Rico
