= Cade Povich =

American baseball player (born 2000)

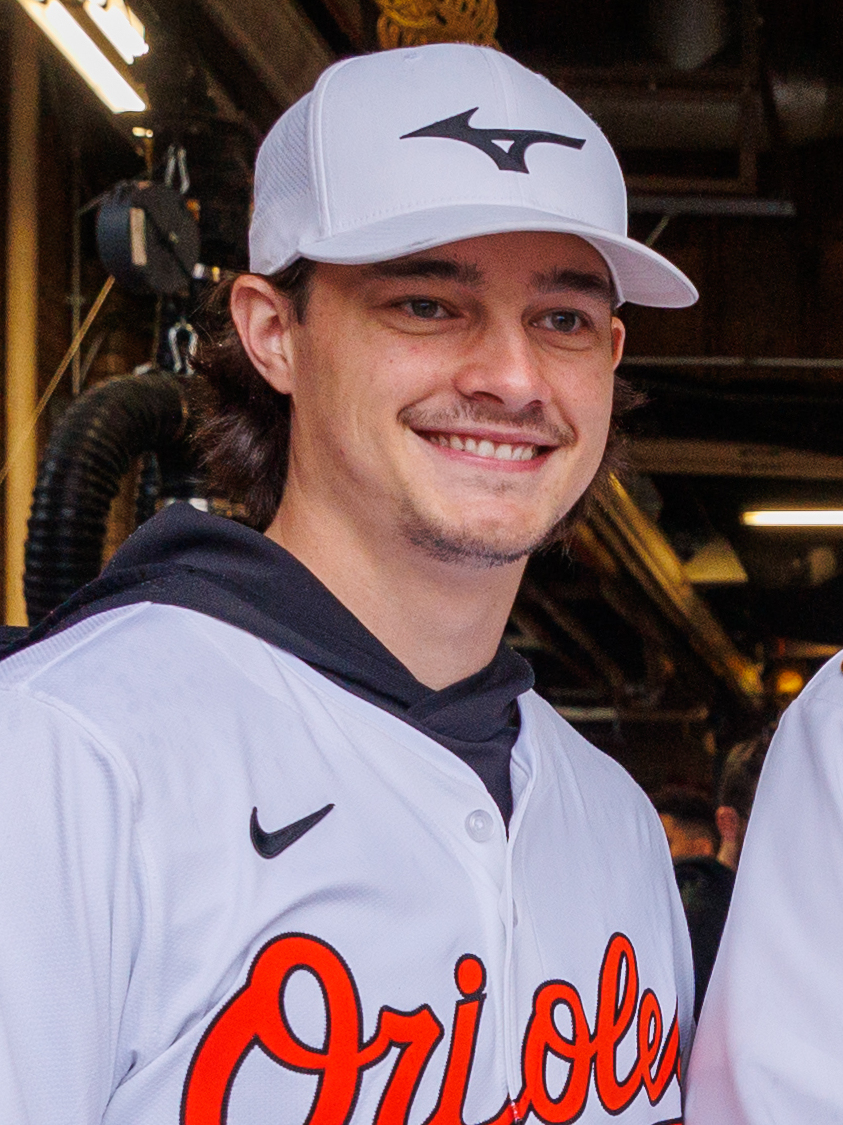
- Povich with the Baltimore Orioles in 2025

Baltimore Orioles – No. 37
- Pitcher
- Born: April 12, 2000 (age 26); Reno, Nevada, U.S.
- Bats: Left Throws: Left

MLB debut
- June 6, 2024, for the Baltimore Orioles

MLB statistics (through 2026 season)
- Win–loss record: 8–18
- Earned run average: 5.07
- Strikeouts: 215
- Stats at Baseball Reference

Teams
- Baltimore Orioles (2024–present)

Cade Jackie Povich (born April 12, 2000) is an American professional baseball pitcher for the Baltimore Orioles of Major League Baseball (MLB).

== Career ==
=== Early career ===
Povich attended Bellevue West High School in Bellevue, Nebraska, and played college baseball at South Mountain Community College and the University of Nebraska–Lincoln.

=== Minnesota Twins ===
Povich was drafted by the Minnesota Twins in the third round of the 2021 Major League Baseball draft.

Povich made his professional debut with the rookie–level Florida Complex League Twins and was promoted to the Single–A Fort Myers Mighty Mussels after one start. He started 2022 with the High–A Cedar Rapids Kernels. In 16 starts for the club, Povich compiled a 6–8 record and 4.46 ERA with 107 strikeouts across 78 2/3 innings pitched.

=== Baltimore Orioles ===
On August 2, 2022, the Twins traded Povich, Yennier Canó, Juan Núñez, and Juan Rojas to the Baltimore Orioles in exchange for Jorge López. He made two scoreless starts for the High–A Aberdeen IronBirds, and finished the year with the Double–A Bowie Baysox, for whom he recorded a 6.94 ERA with 26 strikeouts across six appearances.

Povich split the 2023 season between the Double–A Bowie Baysox and Triple–A Norfolk Tides. In 28 starts between the two affiliates, he accumulated an 8–10 record and 5.04 ERA with 171 strikeouts across 126 2/3 innings of work.

Povich began the 2024 campaign with Triple–A Norfolk, compiling a 5–1 record and 3.18 ERA with 75 strikeouts across 11 starts. On June 6, 2024, he was promoted to the major leagues for the first time. He was the losing pitcher in his MLB debut in a 6–5 away loss to the Toronto Blue Jays later that afternoon, giving up six runs, five hits and four walks with two strikeouts in 5 1/3 innings. The first hit off him was a Vladimir Guerrero Jr. two-out three-run homer in the third inning. Povich allowed two runs and five hits in five innings to earn his first major-league win in a 6–5 home victory over the Texas Rangers on June 29.

Povich started three of four games with a 1–1 record and a 5.12 ERA to begin his 2026 season before going on the injured list with left elbow inflammation on 8 May. He didn't appear in a MLB match until a 3–1 home win over the Los Angeles Angels on 4 August when he pitched six shutout innings and picked off two runners at first base.
