= Brayan Bello =

Dominican baseball player (born 1999)

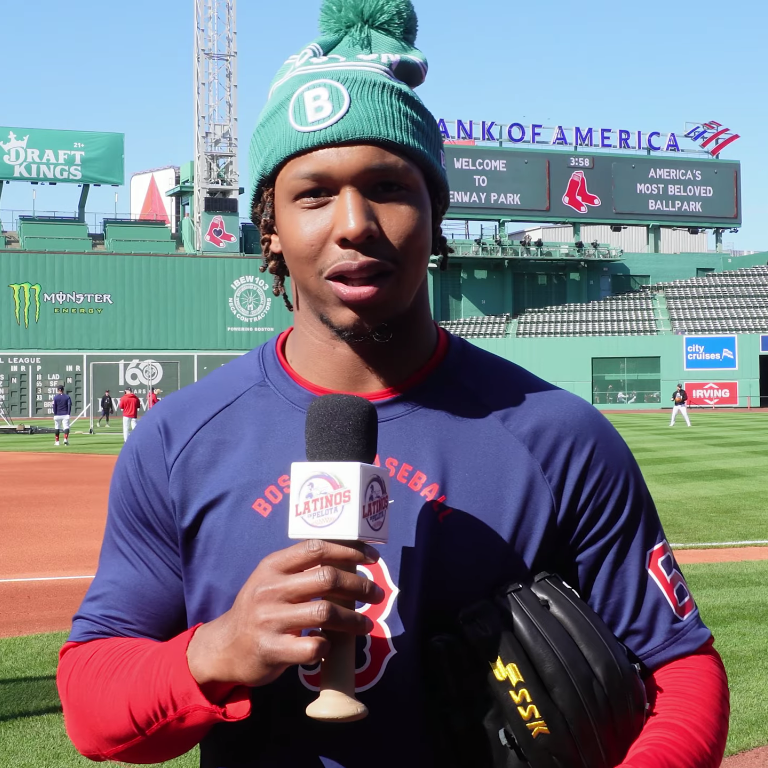
- Bello with the Boston Red Sox in 2026

Boston Red Sox – No. 66
- Pitcher
- Born: May 17, 1999 (age 27); Samaná, Dominican Republic
- Bats: Right Throws: Right

MLB debut
- July 6, 2022, for the Boston Red Sox

MLB statistics (through 2026 season)
- Win–loss record: 45–43
- Earned run average: 4.13
- Strikeouts: 556
- Stats at Baseball Reference

Teams
- Boston Red Sox (2022–present)
Medals
Men's baseball
Representing Dominican Republic
World Baseball Classic
Bronze medal – third place	2026 Miami	Team

Brayan Bello (Note: The 'll' in his surname is pronounced as a 'y' (see yeísmo).) (born May 17, 1999) is a Dominican professional baseball pitcher for the Boston Red Sox of Major League Baseball (MLB). He made his MLB debut in 2022. Listed at 6 feet 1 inch (1.85 m) and 195 pounds (88 kg), he throws and bats right-handed.

== Career ==
Bello signed with the Boston Red Sox as an international free agent on July 2, 2017. He spent his first professional season in 2018 with the Dominican Summer League Red Sox and Gulf Coast League Red Sox. In 2019, he played in Single–A for the Greenville Drive, compiling a 5–10 win–loss record in 25 games, all starts, with a 5.43 earned run average (ERA) while striking out 119 batters in 117 2/3 innings pitched. In 2020, due to the cancellation of the Minor League Baseball season because of COVID-19, he did not play professionally.

Bello started 2021 with Greenville before being promoted to the Double-A Portland Sea Dogs. He was selected to the mid-season All-Star Futures Game, and was named the Starting Pitcher of the Year within Boston's farm system at the end of the season. Bello made six starts for Greenville and 15 starts for Portland, going a combined 7–3 with 3.87 ERA while striking out 132 batters in 95 1/3 innings. On November 19, in advance of the Rule 5 draft, the Red Sox added Bello to their 40-man roster.

Bello began the 2022 season with Portland. He was ranked 97th in the list of baseball's top 100 prospects by Baseball America. On May 5, Bello threw a seven-inning no-hitter in the second game of a doubleheader against the Reading Fightin Phils; it was the fifth no-hitter in Sea Dog history. Bello was promoted to the Triple-A Worcester Red Sox on May 16. In his first nine games with Worcester, he posted a 6–2 record and a 2.81 ERA while striking out 72 batters in 51 1/3 innings.

On July 4, the Red Sox announced that Bello would be promoted to the major leagues for the first time. He made his major-league debut on July 6, starting against the Tampa Bay Rays at Fenway Park, taking the loss after allowing four runs on six hits in four innings. He made another start on July 11, then was optioned back to Worcester. Bello was selected to the 2022 All-Star Futures Game but replaced on the roster due to his major-league promotion. He was recalled by Boston on July 22. On August 4, he was placed on the injured list with a left groin strain. He rejoined the team on August 24. On September 3, Bello tossed six scoreless innings against the Texas Rangers, striking out five en route to his first major league victory. Overall with Boston during 2022, Bello pitched to a 2–8 record in 13 games (11 starts) while compiling a 4.71 ERA and striking out 55 batters in 57 1/3 innings. In 18 minor-league games (17 starts) he went 10–4 with a 2.34 ERA while striking out 129 batters in 96 innings. Bello was named the minor-league Starting Pitcher of the Year by the Red Sox organization.

Bello began the 2023 season on the injured list with right elbow inflammation. He was activated on April 17. After posting a 9.82 ERA in two starts, he was optioned to Worcester on April 24, then recalled on April 28 when Garrett Whitlock was placed on the injured list. For the 2023 season, Bello appeared in 28 major-league games, all starts, and posted a 12–11 record with a 4.24 ERA while striking out 132 batters in 157 innings.

On March 9, 2024, Bello signed a six-year, $55 million contract extension with the Red Sox including a seventh-year club option for $21 million. During spring training, he was named the team's starter for Opening Day of the 2024 season. Due to lat muscle tightness, Bello was on the injured list from late April until being activated on May 12.

On July 8, 2025, Bello tossed a complete game against the Colorado Rockies, recording the win in the 10–2 victory.

On June 5, 2026, the Red Sox announced that Bello would be optioned to Worcester after he recorded a 6.34 ERA in 12 appearances. Bello was recalled from Worcester on July 12, 2026.

== See also ==
- List of Major League Baseball players from the Dominican Republic
