= Austin Slater =

American baseball player (born 1992)

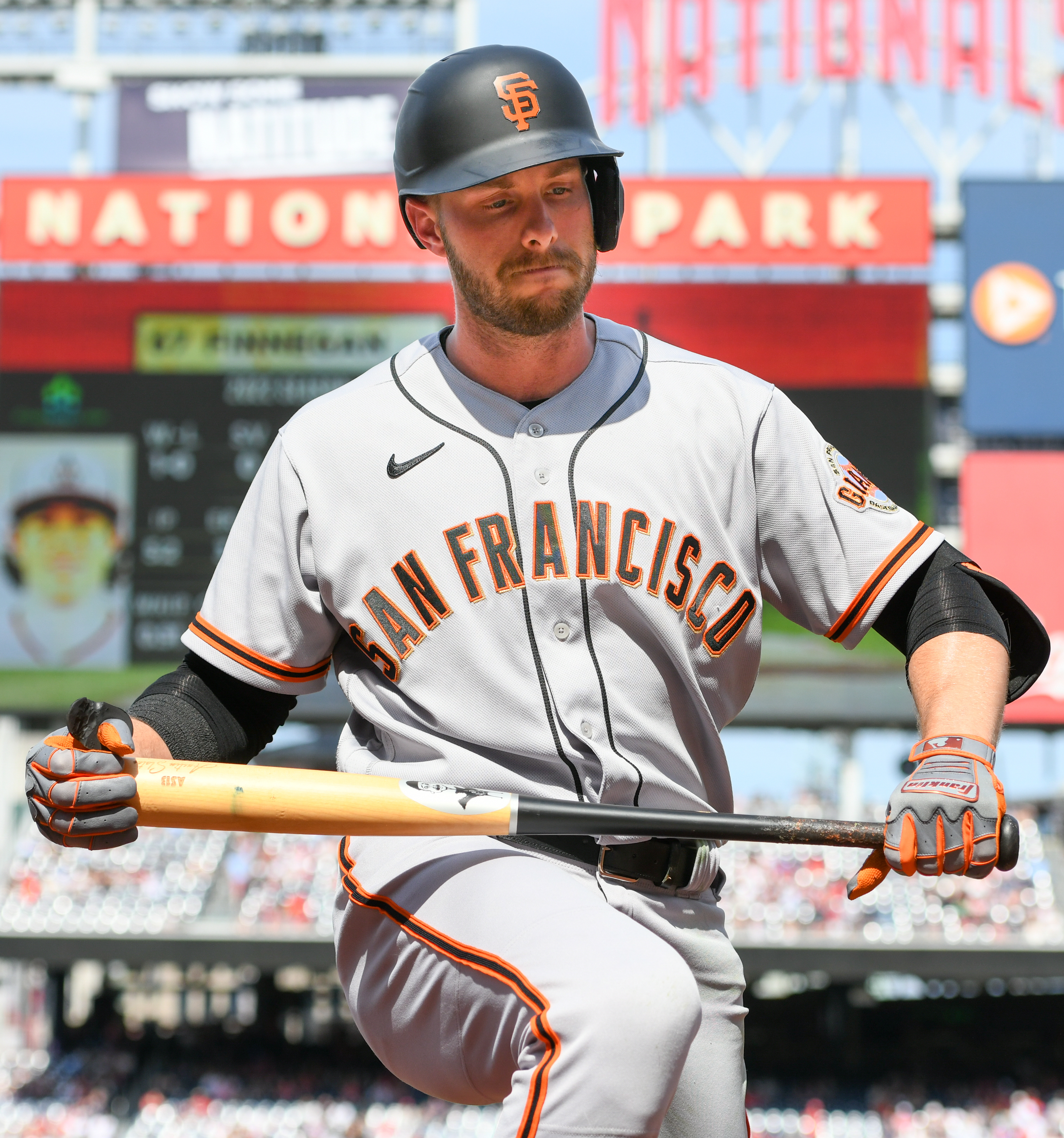
- Slater with the Giants in 2022

Free agent
- Outfielder
- Born: December 13, 1992 (age 33); Jacksonville, Florida, U.S.
- Bats: Right Throws: Right

MLB debut
- June 2, 2017, for the San Francisco Giants

MLB statistics (through 2026 season)
- Batting average: .248
- Home runs: 45
- Runs batted in: 187
- Stats at Baseball Reference

Teams
- San Francisco Giants (2017–2024); Cincinnati Reds (2024); Baltimore Orioles (2024); Chicago White Sox (2025); New York Yankees (2025); Miami Marlins (2026); New York Mets (2026); Tampa Bay Rays (2026)

Austin Thomas Slater (born December 13, 1992) is an American professional baseball outfielder who is a free agent. He has previously played in Major League Baseball (MLB) for the San Francisco Giants, Cincinnati Reds, Baltimore Orioles, Chicago White Sox, New York Yankees, Miami Marlins, New York Mets, and Tampa Bay Rays. He played college baseball for the Stanford Cardinal, and was selected by the Giants in the eighth round of the 2014 MLB draft. He made his MLB debut in 2017 with the Giants.

== Early life and career ==
Austin Thomas Slater was born on December 13, 1992, in Jacksonville, Florida. Slater attended The Bolles School in Jacksonville and played for the school's baseball team. He broke his ankle while playing frisbee, and did not play baseball in his senior year. He was teammates in high school with Hayden Hurst and DJ Stewart. He was drafted as a shortstop by the Los Angeles Dodgers in the 44th round of the 2011 Major League Baseball draft.

Slater did not sign, and instead played college baseball at Stanford University, batting .310 with five home runs and 72 runs batted in (RBIs) in 113 career games during three seasons. Slater played for the Hyannis Harbor Hawks of the Cape Cod Baseball League in the summers of 2013 and 2014, and was named a league all-star in 2013.

== Professional career ==
=== San Francisco Giants (2014–2024) ===
==== Minor leagues (2014–2017) ====
After his junior year, the San Francisco Giants selected Slater in the eighth round of the 2014 MLB draft, and he signed for a $200,000 signing bonus. Slater made his professional debut in 2014 with the Arizona League Giants and was promoted to the Salem-Keizer Volcanoes after two games. In 31 games between both teams, he batted .346 with two home runs and 25 RBI. He was moved from outfield to second base in 2015.

Slater spent the 2015 season with the San Jose Giants and Richmond Flying Squirrels, where he posted a .294 batting average with three home runs and 47 RBI in 114 games between both teams. He was a CAL mid-season All Star. After the season, the Giants assigned him to the Scottsdale Scorpions of the Arizona Fall League (AFL).

Slater was moved back to the outfield in 2016 and started the year back with Richmond, and was later promoted to the Sacramento River Cats. In 109 games between both teams, he posted a combined .305 batting average with 18 home runs and 67 RBI. He was an MiLB 2016 organization All Star. Slater played for the Scorpions of the AFL after the regular season. He began the 2017 season with Sacramento.

==== 2017–2019 ====
On June 2, 2017, the Giants promoted Slater to the major leagues. He made his debut later that night, starting at right field against the Philadelphia Phillies. Slater recorded his first career hit and RBI in the sixth inning in the same game. He spent the remainder of the season with the Giants after his promotion, batting .282/.339/.402 with three home runs and 16 RBI in 117 at–bats in 34 games.

Slater began the 2018 season with Sacramento, where he batted .344/.417/.564 with five home runs and 32 RBI in 195 at–bats, and stole seven bases without being caught. He was an MiLB 2018 organization All Star. In 2018 with the Giants, Slater batted .251/.333/.307 with one home run and 23 RBI in at 199–bats.

Slater played part of the 2019 season with Sacramento, batting .308/.436/.529 with 12 home runs and 45 RBI in 240 at–bats. In 2019 with the Giants, playing primarily right field, he batted .238/.333/.417 with five home runs and 21 RBI in 168 at–bats.

==== 2020–2024 ====
In the COVID-19 pandemic-shortened 2020 MLB season, Slater batted .282/.408/.506 with 18 runs, five home runs, and seven RBIs in 85 at–bats. Slater stole eight bases (10th in the NL) in nine attempts (his 88.89% stolen base percentage was 5th-best in the NL).

Avoiding arbitration, Slater and the Giants agreed on a $1.15 million salary for the 2021 season. In the 2021 regular season, he batted .241/.320/.423 with 39 runs, 12 home runs, and 32 RBI in 274 at–bats, and stole 15 bases in 17 attempts (his 88.24% success rate led the National League). As a pinch hitter, he led the major leagues with 13 RBIs, and tied for the major league lead with four home runs. He primarily played center field, with stints in left field and right field (his perfect fielding percentage led all NL outfielders), and one game as a pitcher.

In 2022, Slater batted .264/.366/.408 in a career-high 277 at–bats, with 49 runs, seven home runs, 34 RBI, and 12 stolen bases on 13 attempts. He played 106 games in center field, 44 as a pinch hitter, 16 in left field, 14 in right field, seven as a pinch runner, and two as a designated hitter. Slater batted 10-for-30 as a pinch hitter, with 11 walks and three hit-by-pitch (.333/.546/.500). His 10 pinch hits were second in the major leagues, and his six pinch RBIs tied for fifth.

On January 13, 2023, Slater agreed to a one-year, $3.2 million contract with the Giants, avoiding salary arbitration. In 89 games for San Francisco, he hit .270/.348/.400 with five home runs and 20 RBI. Following the season on October 11, Slater underwent arthroscopic surgery to remove a bone spur from the back of his right elbow.

=== Cincinnati Reds (2024) ===
On July 7, 2024, the Giants traded Slater to the Cincinnati Reds in exchange for Alex Young. In 8 games for Cincinnati, Slater went 2–for–18 (.111) with 3 RBI and 2 walks.

=== Baltimore Orioles (2024) ===
On July 30, 2024, the Reds traded Slater, infielder Liván Soto, and cash considerations to the Baltimore Orioles in exchange for cash considerations or a player to be named later. In 33 games for Baltimore, he slashed .246/.342/.333 with one home run, six RBI, and one stolen base.

=== Chicago White Sox (2025) ===
On November 18, 2024, Slater signed a one-year, $1.7 million contract with the Chicago White Sox. On April 12, 2025, he was placed on the injured list after suffering a meniscus tear in his right knee. On April 15, Slater was ruled out for four-to-six weeks after undergoing surgery. In 51 total appearances for Chicago, he batted .236/.299/.423 with five home runs, 11 RBI, and one stolen base.

=== New York Yankees (2025) ===
On July 30, 2025, the White Sox traded Slater to the New York Yankees in exchange for Gage Ziehl. Slater made 14 appearances for the Yankees, going 3-for-25 (.120) with two RBI.

=== Miami Marlins (2026) ===
On February 10, 2026, Slater signed a minor league contract with the Detroit Tigers. He was released by the Tigers on March 21, after failing to win a major league job in spring training. On March 24, Slater signed a major league contract with the Miami Marlins. He made 12 appearances for Miami, going 4-for-23 (.174) with one RBI and one stolen base. On April 23, Slater was designated for assignment by the Marlins. He elected free agency after clearing waivers on April 26.

=== New York Mets (2026) ===
On April 27, 2026, Slater signed a major league contract with the New York Mets. He made nine appearances for the team, going 5-for-20 (.250) with one RBI and one walk. On May 19, Slater was designated for assignment by the Mets. He cleared waivers and was sent outright to the Triple-A Syracuse Mets on May 22. However, two days later, Slater rejected the assignment in favor of free agency.

=== Tampa Bay Rays (2026) ===
On May 26, 2026, Slater signed a minor league contract with the Tampa Bay Rays organization. He was assigned to the Triple-A Durham Bulls following the signing. On June 8, Slater's contract was selected by the Rays. In seven appearances for Tampa Bay, he went 6-for-22 (.273) with one RBI and three stolen bases. Slater was designated for assignment by the Rays on June 19. He elected free agency after clearing waivers on June 22. Slater re-signed with Tampa Bay on a minor league contract on June 30. On August 26, Slater opted out of his contract and became a free agent. On September 1, he re-signed with the Rays on a minor league contract. He elected free agency on November 2.

== Personal life ==
Slater was born and raised in Jacksonville, Florida. He was named after his grandfather, Ed Austin, who was Mayor of Jacksonville from 1991–95.
