= Yennier Canó =

Cuban baseball player (born 1994)

Baltimore Orioles – No. 78
- Pitcher
- Born: March 9, 1994 (age 32); Ciego de Ávila, Cuba
- Bats: Right Throws: Right

MLB debut
- May 12, 2022, for the Minnesota Twins

MLB statistics (through 2026 season)
- Win–loss record: 13–18
- Earned run average: 3.83
- Strikeouts: 249
- Stats at Baseball Reference

Teams
- Minnesota Twins (2022); Baltimore Orioles (2022–present)

Career highlights and awards
- All-Star (2023)
Medals
Men's baseball
Representing Cuba
Pan American Games
Bronze medal – third place	2015 Toronto	Team

Yennier Canó Banes (born March 9, 1994) is a Cuban professional baseball pitcher for the Baltimore Orioles of Major League Baseball (MLB). He made his MLB debut in 2022 with the Minnesota Twins and was an All-Star in 2023 for the Orioles.

== Career ==
Canó played in the Cuban National Series for the Tigres de Ciego de Ávila from 2013 to 2016.

=== Minnesota Twins ===
On June 15, 2019, Canó signed with the Minnesota Twins as an international free agent. He spent his first season in the organization with the rookie-level Gulf Coast Twins and the High-A Fort Myers Miracle. Canó did not play in a game in 2020 due to the cancellation of the minor league season because of the COVID-19 pandemic. He spent the 2021 season with the Double-A Wichita Wind Surge and Triple-A St. Paul Saints, pitching to a cumulative 5–3 record and 3.23 ERA with 86 strikeouts and 5 saves in 69.2 innings of work. He began the 2022 season with St. Paul.

Canó was selected to the 40-man roster and called up to the major leagues for the first time on May 11, 2022. Canó appeared in 10 games for Minnesota, allowing 14 runs, before the Twins optioned him back to St. Paul.

=== Baltimore Orioles ===
On August 2, 2022, the Twins traded Canó, Cade Povich, Juan Núñez, and Juan Rojas to the Baltimore Orioles in exchange for Jorge López. Canó made three appearances for the Orioles, but struggled immensely, allowing 9 runs on 9 hits with 7 strikeouts in 4.1 innings pitched. He spent the remainder of the year with the Triple-A Norfolk Tides, recording a 4.32 ERA across 11 games.

Canó was optioned to Triple-A Norfolk to begin the 2023 season but was recalled on April 14, 2023. He retired the first 24 batters he faced without allowing a base runner to begin the season, tying an Orioles record held by Fred Holdsworth. Canó was named to his first All-Star Game in 2023 along with fellow Orioles reliever Félix Bautista. Canó finished the season with a 2.11 ERA and a league-leading 31 holds.

Canó was announced as part of FEPCUBE's "Patria y Vida" team of expatriate Cuban ballplayers participating in the inaugural Intercontinental Series in Barranquilla, Colombia.

On June 22, 2025, Canó was optioned to Triple-A Norfolk after posting a 4.73 ERA through 32 games. Following a brief two-appearance stint in the minors, Canó was recalled to the majors on July 2, to replace Keegan Akin, who was placed on the 15-day injured list.

On July 31, 2026, Canó agreed to a two-year, $7.5 million contract extension with the Orioles.
