= Grayson Rodriguez =

American baseball player (born 1999)

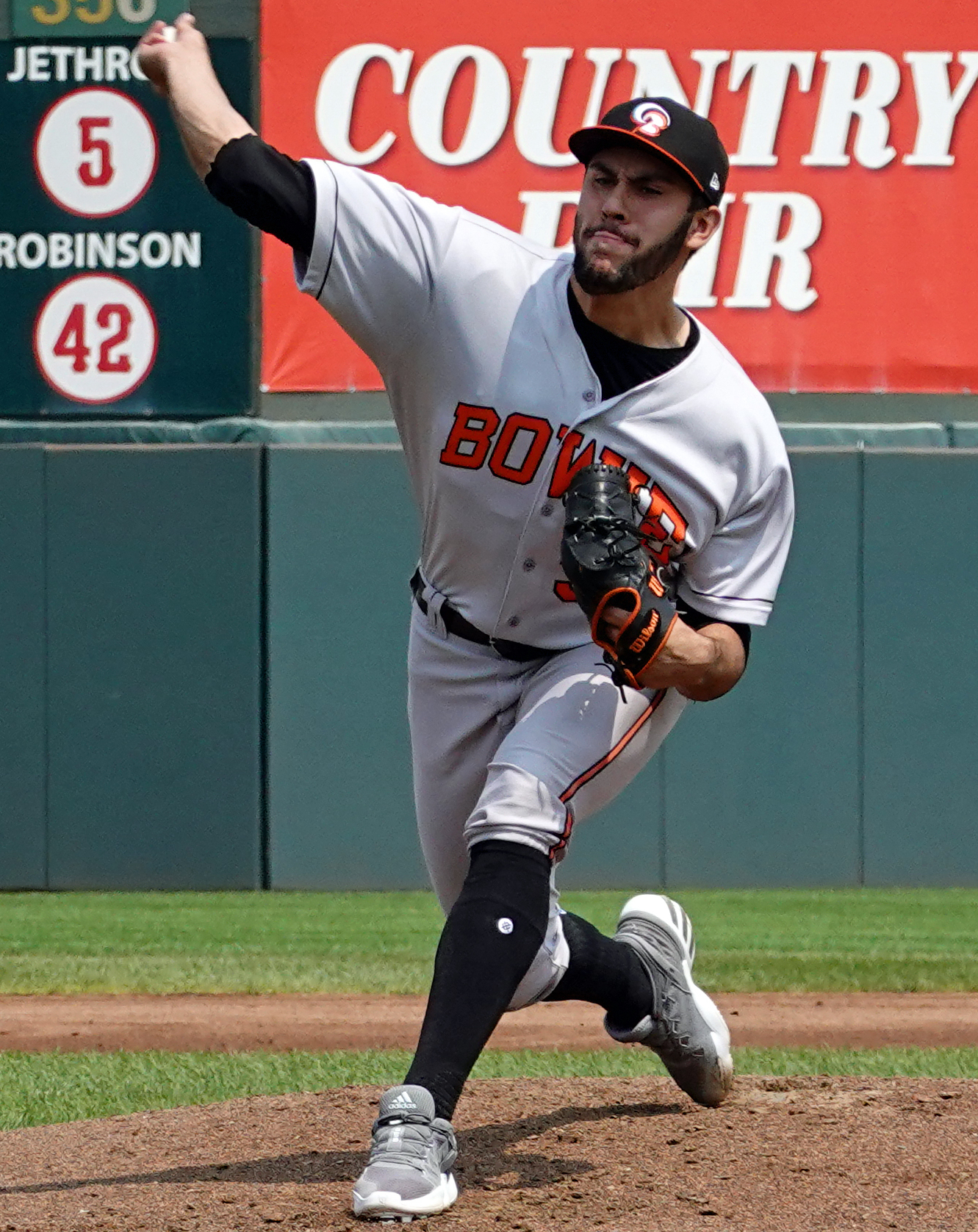
- Rodriguez with the Bowie Baysox in 2021

Los Angeles Angels – No. 21
- Pitcher
- Born: November 16, 1999 (age 26); Houston, Texas, U.S.
- Bats: Left Throws: Right

MLB debut
- April 5, 2023, for the Baltimore Orioles

MLB statistics (through 2026 season)
- Win–loss record: 25–16
- Earned run average: 4.67
- Strikeouts: 344
- Stats at Baseball Reference

Teams
- Baltimore Orioles (2023–2024); Los Angeles Angels (2026–present)

Grayson Greer Rodriguez (born November 16, 1999) is an American professional baseball pitcher for the Los Angeles Angels of Major League Baseball (MLB). He has previously played in MLB for the Baltimore Orioles. The Orioles selected Rodriguez in the first round of the 2018 Major League Baseball draft. He made his MLB debut in 2023.

== Amateur career ==
Rodriguez attended Central Heights High School in Nacogdoches, Texas. As a junior, he had a 14–1 win–loss record with a 0.38 earned run average (ERA), leading Central Heights to the 3A state title. He signed to play college baseball at Texas A&M University.

== Professional career ==
=== Baltimore Orioles ===
The Baltimore Orioles selected Rodriguez in the first round, with the 11th overall selection, of the 2018 Major League Baseball draft. On June 12, 2018, Rodriguez signed with the Orioles for $4.3 million. He made his professional debut with the rookie-level Gulf Coast League Orioles and spent the whole season there, going 0–2 with a 1.40 ERA in nine games (eight starts).

Rodriguez spent 2019 with the Delmarva Shorebirds, earning South Atlantic League All-Star honors. That July, Rodriguez represented the Orioles at the 2019 All-Star Futures Game. Over twenty starts with Delmarva, he went 10–4 with a 2.68 ERA, striking out 129 batters over 94 innings. Rodriguez did not play in a game in 2020 due to the cancellation of the minor league season because of the COVID-19 pandemic.

To begin the 2021 season, Rodriguez was assigned to the Aberdeen IronBirds. He was promoted to the Bowie Baysox during the season. Over 23 starts between the two teams, he went 9–1 with a 2.36 ERA and 161 strikeouts over 103 innings.

Rodriguez was assigned to the Triple-A Norfolk Tides to begin the 2022 season. On June 2, 2022, it was announced that Rodriguez would miss time with a right lat muscle strain. He had compiled a 2.09 ERA in 11 starts with Norfolk at the time of his injury. On November 15, the Orioles added Rodriguez to their 40-man roster to protect him from the Rule 5 draft.

On March 27, 2023, the Orioles announced that Rodriguez would not be part of the Opening Day rotation and would begin the year in Norfolk. On April 4, it was announced that Rodriguez would be starting on April 5 against the Texas Rangers. In his debut, he pitched five innings, allowing 2 earned runs on 4 hits, while striking out five, resulting in a no decision. He went eight innings without a walk in an 8–0 home win over the Tampa Bay Rays on September 16. In 23 starts for the Orioles during his rookie campaign, Rodriguez posted a 7-4 record and 4.35 ERA with 129 strikeouts over 122 innings of work.

Rodriguez made 20 starts for Baltimore during the 2024 campaign, posting a 13-4 record and 3.86 ERA with 130 strikeouts across 116 2/3 innings pitched. On August 6, 2024, Rodriguez was scratched from a scheduled start against the Toronto Blue Jays with right lat/teres discomfort; he was placed on the 15-day injured list the following day. On September 25, it was announced that Rodriguez would be shut down for the remainder of the season.

Rodriguez began the 2025 season on the injured list with elbow inflammation, and received a cortisone shot to deal with the issue. On April 17, 2025, he had a side session cancelled due to shoulder soreness, and was sent for an MRI. On April 23, Rodriguez was diagnosed with a mild strain in his right lat, and he was transferred to the 60-day injured list on April 28. On August 4, it was announced that Rodriguez would undergo a season-ending elbow debridement surgery.

=== Los Angeles Angels ===
On November 18, 2025, the Orioles traded Rodriguez to the Los Angeles Angels in exchange for Taylor Ward.

== Personal life ==
Rodriguez married Madison Freeland in 2023.
