= David Bañuelos =

American baseball player (born 1996)

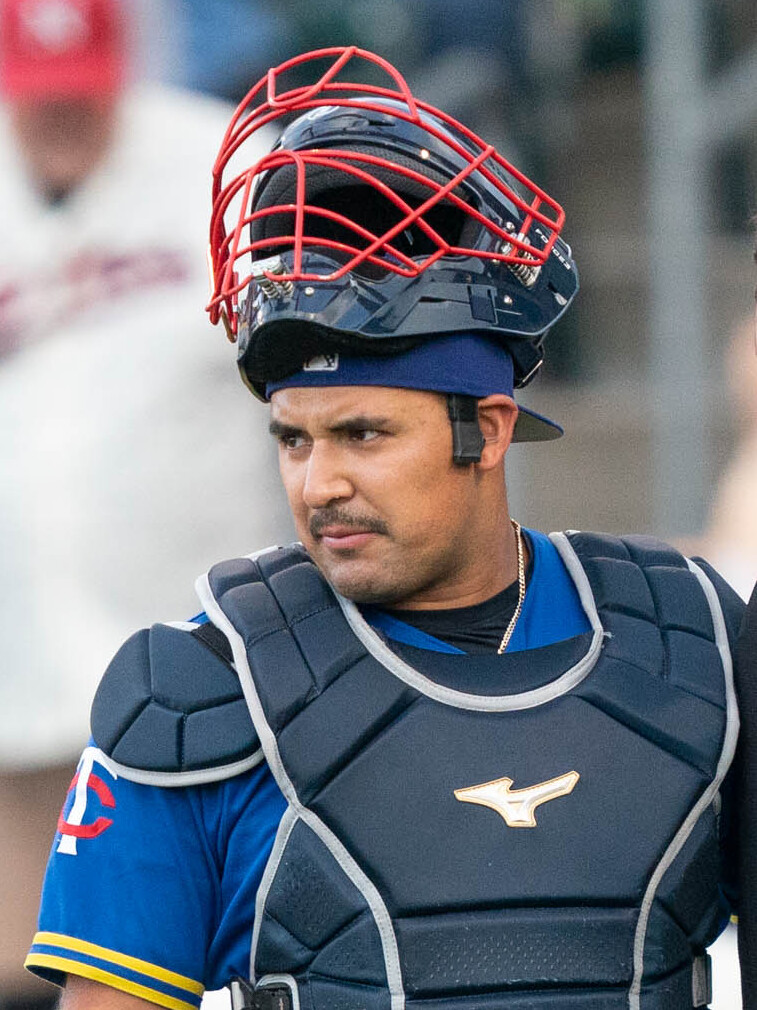
- Bañuelos with the St. Paul Saints in 2026

Free agent
- Catcher
- Born: October 1, 1996 (age 30); Ontario, California, U.S.
- Bats: Right Throws: Right

MLB debut
- April 16, 2024, for the Baltimore Orioles

MLB statistics (through 2025 season)
- Batting average: .000
- Home runs: 0
- Runs batted in: 0
- Stats at Baseball Reference

Teams
- Baltimore Orioles (2024–2025)

David Clemente Bañuelos (born October 1, 1996) is an American professional baseball catcher who is a free agent. He has previously played in Major League Baseball (MLB) for the Baltimore Orioles.

== Amateur career ==
Bañuelos attended Damien High School in La Verne, California, graduating in 2014. As a senior, he batted .395 with four home runs and 24 runs batted in (RBIs) for the baseball team. Undrafted out of high school in the 2014 MLB draft, he enrolled at California State University, Long Beach, and played college baseball for the Long Beach State Dirtbags. He became the Dirtbags' starting catcher as a sophomore in 2016. During the summer of 2016, he played collegiate summer baseball for the Bellingham Bells of the West Coast League. In 2017, he batted .289 with seven home runs and 29 RBIs and was named a First-Team All-American by Baseball America and one of three finalists for the Johnny Bench Award.

== Professional career ==
=== Seattle Mariners ===
The Seattle Mariners drafted Bañuelos in the fifth round, with the 153rd overall selection, of the 2017 Major League Baseball draft. He signed with the Mariners, receiving a $300,000 signing bonus, and made his professional debut with the Low–A Everett AquaSox, where he spent his first professional season, posting a .236 batting average with four home runs and 26 RBI in 36 games.

=== Minnesota Twins ===
On December 6, 2017, in an attempt to sign Shohei Ohtani during the 2017–18 offseason, the Mariners traded Bañuelos to the Minnesota Twins for $1 million in international signing bonus money. He spent the 2018 season with the Single–A Cedar Rapids Kernels, batting .220 with two home runs and 22 RBI in 73 games.

Bañuelos begin 2019 with Cedar Rapids before being promoted to the High–A Fort Myers Miracle in May. Over 63 games, he slashed .177/.232/.263 with two home runs and twenty RBI. Bañuelos did not play in a game in 2020 due to the cancellation of the minor league season because of the COVID-19 pandemic. He returned to action in 2021 with the Double–A Wichita Wind Surge and Triple–A St. Paul Saints. In 45 games between the two affiliates, Bañuelos batted .201/.245/.340 with 3 home runs and 18 RBI.

Bañuelos spent the 2022 season with Triple–A St. Paul, playing in 55 games and hitting .204/.273/.376 with 8 home runs and 26 RBI. He spent the entirety of 2023 with Double–A Wichita, playing in 48 contests and slashing .270/.369/.526 with career–highs in home runs (10) and RBI (30). Bañuelos elected free agency following the season on November 6, 2023.

=== Baltimore Orioles ===
On December 21, 2023, Bañuelos signed a minor league contract with the Baltimore Orioles. On April 16, 2024, Bañuelos was selected to the 40-man roster and promoted to the major leagues for the first time. He made his major league debut that night as a pinch hitter, and flew out in his only at–bat. The following day, Bañuelos was designated for assignment by Baltimore. He cleared waivers and was sent outright to the Triple–A Norfolk Tides on April 19. On April 22, the Orioles selected Bañuelos' contract, adding him back to the major league roster. He did not appear for Baltimore before he was designated for assignment for a second time on April 26. Bañuelos cleared waivers on the following day, and was once more sent outright to Norfolk. On September 1, the Orioles selected Bañuelos' contract, adding him to their active roster. He did not play for Baltimore before he was designated for assignment the following day. Bañuelos cleared waivers and was sent outright to Norfolk on September 5.

On October 16, 2024, Bañuelos re-signed with the Orioles on a minor league contract, and he began the 2025 season with Triple-A Norfolk. On July 10, 2025, the Orioles selected Bañuelos' contract, adding him to their active roster. He played in one game for the team against the Miami Marlins, being hit by an Eury Pérez pitch and striking out against Josh Simpson in his sole plate appearances. On July 14, Bañuelos was removed from the 40-man roster and sent outright to Triple-A Norfolk. He elected free agency on October 6.

=== Minnesota Twins (second stint) ===
On February 5, 2026, Bañuelos signed a minor league contract with the Minnesota Twins. In 54 games with Triple-A St. Paul Saints he batted .193/.265/.343 with 7 home runs and 22 RBIs. He elected free agency on November 2.
