= 2024 Los Angeles Angels season =

Major League Baseball season

2024 Los Angeles Angels
- League: American League
- Division: West
- Ballpark: Angel Stadium
- City: Anaheim, California
- Record: 63–99 (.389)
- Divisional place: 5th
- Owner: Arte Moreno
- General manager: Perry Minasian
- Manager: Ron Washington
- Television: Bally Sports West (Wayne Randazzo/Matt Vasgersian/Patrick O'Neal, Mark Gubicza, Erica Weston)
- Radio: KLAA (AM 830); KSPN (AM 710); Angels Radio Network; Spanish: KWKW (AM 1330)
- Stats: ESPN.com; Baseball Reference

The 2024 Los Angeles Angels season was the 64th season of the Angels franchise in the American League, the 59th season in Anaheim, California, and their 59th season playing their home games at Angel Stadium.

On July 21, the Angels beat the Oakland Athletics to win their 5,000th game as a franchise, which is the first for an expansion team. On September 11, the Angels were eliminated from postseason contention for the tenth straight year.

On September 22, the Angels beat the Houston Astros 9–8, winning their 63rd game of the season. They remain the only team in the MLB to have never lost 100 games. On September 26, the Angels lost 7–0 to the Chicago White Sox for their 96th loss of the season, surpassing their previous worst 1968 season. The Angels ultimately finished the season 63–99, and finished in last place in the American League West for the first time since 1999.

With the Detroit Tigers clinching a playoff berth on September 27, 2024, the Angels currently hold the longest active playoff drought in Major League Baseball at 10 consecutive seasons without a playoff berth.

== Season standings ==
=== American League West ===
AL West
Team	W	L	Pct.	GB	Home	Road
Houston Astros	88	73	.547	—	46‍–‍35	42‍–‍38
Seattle Mariners	85	77	.525	3½	49‍–‍32	36‍–‍45
Texas Rangers	78	84	.481	10½	44‍–‍37	34‍–‍47
Oakland Athletics	69	93	.426	19½	38‍–‍43	31‍–‍50
Los Angeles Angels	63	99	.389	25½	32‍–‍49	31‍–‍50

=== American League Wild Card ===
Division leaders
Team	W	L	Pct.
New York Yankees	94	68	.580
Cleveland Guardians	92	69	.571
Houston Astros	88	73	.547

Wild Card teams (Top 3 teams qualify for postseason)
Team	W	L	Pct.	GB
Baltimore Orioles	91	71	.562	+5
Kansas City Royals	86	76	.531	—
Detroit Tigers	86	76	.531	—
Seattle Mariners	85	77	.525	1
Minnesota Twins	82	80	.506	4
Boston Red Sox	81	81	.500	5
Tampa Bay Rays	80	82	.494	6
Texas Rangers	78	84	.481	8
Toronto Blue Jays	74	88	.457	12
Oakland Athletics	69	93	.426	17
Los Angeles Angels	63	99	.389	23
Chicago White Sox	41	121	.253	45

=== Record vs. opponents ===
==== Record vs. American League ====
2024 American League record Source: MLB Standings Grid – 2024
Team	BAL	BOS	CWS	CLE	DET	HOU	KC	LAA	MIN	NYY	OAK	SEA	TB	TEX	TOR	NL
Baltimore	—	8–5	6–1	3–4	2–4	2–5	4–2	4–2	6–0	8–5	3–3	4–2	9–4	5–2	7–6	20–26
Boston	5–8	—	4–3	2–5	3–4	2–4	4–2	4–2	3–3	6–7	5–1	4–3	6–7	4–2	8–5	21–25
Chicago	1–6	3–4	—	5–8	3–10	2–4	1–12	4–2	1–12	1–5	3–3	1–6	4–2	0–7	1–5	11–35
Cleveland	4–3	5–2	8–5	—	7–6	1–4	5–8	5–1	10–3	2–4	6–1	4–2	3–4	4–2	4–2	24–22
Detroit	4–2	4–3	10–3	6–7	—	2–4	6–7	3–4	6–7	2–4	3–3	5–1	5–1	3–4	5–2	22–24
Houston	5–2	4–2	4–2	4–1	4–2	—	4–3	9–4	2–4	1–6	8–5	5–8	4–2	7–6	5–2	22–24
Kansas City	2–4	2–4	12–1	8–5	7–6	3–4	—	5–2	6–7	2–5	4–2	3–3	3–3	1–5	5–2	23–23
Los Angeles	2–4	2–4	2–4	1–5	4–3	4–9	2–5	—	1–5	3–3	5–8	8–5	3–4	4–9	0–7	22–24
Minnesota	0–6	3–3	12–1	3–10	7–6	4–2	7–6	5–1	—	0–6	6–1	5–2	3–4	5–2	4–2	18–28
New York	5–8	7–6	5–1	4–2	4–2	6–1	5–2	3–3	6–0	—	5–2	4–3	7–6	3–3	7–6	23–23
Oakland	3–3	1–5	3–3	1–6	3–3	5–8	2–4	8–5	1–6	2–5	—	4–9	3–4	6–7	3–3	24–22
Seattle	2–4	3–4	6–1	2–4	1–5	8–5	3–3	5–8	2–5	3–4	9–4	—	3–3	10–3	2–4	26–20
Tampa Bay	4–9	7–6	2–4	4–3	1–5	2–4	3–3	4–3	4–3	6–7	4–3	3–3	—	1–5	9–4	26–20
Texas	2–5	2–4	7–0	2–4	4–3	6–7	5–1	9–4	2–5	3–3	7–6	3–10	5–1	—	2–4	19–27
Toronto	6–7	5–8	5–1	2–4	2–5	2–5	2–5	7–0	2–4	6–7	3–3	4–2	4–9	4–2	—	20–26

Updated with the results of all games through September 30, 2024.

==== Record vs. National League ====
2024 American League record vs. National League Source: MLB Standings
Team	AZ	ATL	CHC	CIN	COL	LAD	MIA	MIL	NYM	PHI	PIT	SD	SF	STL	WSH
Baltimore	2–1	2–1	0–3	3–0	2–1	1–2	1–2	1–2	1–2	2–1	1–2	1–2	1–2	0–3	2–2
Boston	0–3	1–3	2–1	2–1	1–2	0–3	3–0	1–2	0–3	2–1	3–0	1–2	2–1	1–2	2–1
Chicago	1–2	2–1	0–4	0–3	2–1	0–3	1–2	0–3	0–3	0–3	0–3	0–3	1–2	2–1	2–1
Cleveland	0–3	1–2	3–0	3–1	1–2	1–2	2–1	0–3	3–0	2–1	2–1	1–2	2–1	1–2	2–1
Detroit	2–1	0–3	1–2	3–0	2–1	2–1	1–2	1–2	2–1	1–2	2–2	1–2	1–2	2–1	1–2
Houston	2–1	0–3	0–3	0–3	4–0	2–1	3–0	2–1	2–1	1–2	1–2	1–2	1–2	2–1	1–2
Kansas City	1–2	1–2	1–2	3–0	1–2	1–2	2–1	2–1	1–2	1–2	2–1	1–2	0–3	3–1	3–0
Los Angeles	1–2	1–2	1–2	0–3	1–2	2–2	3–0	1–2	2–1	1–2	2–1	3–0	2–1	1–2	1–2
Minnesota	2–1	0–3	1–2	1–2	2–1	1–2	1–2	1–3	1–2	2–1	1–2	1–2	1–2	1–2	2–1
New York	2–1	1–2	2–1	0–3	2–1	1–2	2–1	2–1	0–4	3–0	1–2	2–1	3–0	1–2	1–2
Oakland	1–2	1–2	2–1	2–1	2–1	1–2	2–1	1–2	2–1	2–1	3–0	0–3	2–2	1–2	2–1
Seattle	2–1	2–1	1–2	3–0	2–1	0–3	1–2	1–2	3–0	2–1	1–2	3–1	2–1	2–1	1–2
Tampa Bay	3–0	1–2	2–1	2–1	2–1	1–2	3–1	1–2	3–0	0–3	2–1	1–2	2–1	1–2	2–1
Texas	2–2	1–2	2–1	2–1	0–3	2–1	2–1	0–3	1–2	0–3	2–1	1–2	1–2	1–2	2–1
Toronto	1–2	1–2	1–2	1–2	2–1	1–2	0–3	1–2	1–2	1–3	2–1	2–1	2–1	3–0	1–2

Updated with the results of all games through September 30, 2024.

== Offseason ==
The Angels finished the 2023 season 73–89, 17 games out of first place. They missed the playoffs for the 9th consecutive season and now tied for the longest current playoff drought with the Tigers. Both teams have not made the playoffs since 2014.

=== November–December 2023 ===
On November 2, 2023, infielders Mike Moustakas, Gio Urshela, C. J. Cron, Outfielder Randal Grichuk and P/DH Shohei Ohtani all elected free agency.

On November 8, 2023, the Angels hired Ron Washington to become the teams 23rd manager in team history.

=== Transactions ===
==== November 2023 ====
November 2	INF Mike Moustakas, INF Gio Urshela, 1B C. J. Cron, OF Randal Grichuk and RHP/DH Shohei Ohtani elected free agency.
November 6	INF Eduardo Escobar and LHP Aaron Loup elected free agency after having their options declined by the club
November 26	Angels signed left-handed pitcher Adam Kolarek to a 1 year, $900,000 contract

==== December 2023 ====
December 8	Atlanta Braves traded 1st baseman Evan White and left-handed pitcher Tyler Thomas to Los Angeles Angels for infielder David Fletcher and catcher Max Stassi
December 13	Angels signed right-handed pitcher Luis García to a 1 year, $4.25 million contract Angels signed right-handed pitcher Adam Cimber to a 1 year, $1.65 million contract

==== January 2024 ====
January 6	Angels signed right-handed pitcher Zach Plesac to a 1 year, $1 million contract
January 23	Angels signed right-handed pitcher Robert Stephenson to a 3 year, $33 million contract
January 27	Angels signed left-handed pitcher Matt Moore to a 1 year, $9 million contract
January 29	Angels signed outfielder Aaron Hicks to a 1 year contract
January 31	Houston Astros traded right-handed pitcher Carlos Espinosa to Los Angeles Angels for infielder/outfielder Trey Cabbage

==== February 2024 ====
February 3	Angels signed right-handed pitcher José Cisnero to a 1 year, $1.75 million contract
February 7	St. Louis Cardinals traded right-handed pitcher Guillermo Zuñiga to Los Angeles Angels for cash considerations

==== April 2024 ====
April 4th	Angels signed free agent Third Basemen Cam Williams to a minor league contract
April 8th	Angels selected the contract of right-handed pitcher Hunter Strickland from Salt Lake
April 8th	Angels selected the contract of right-handed pitcher Carson Fulmer from Salt Lake
April 8th	Angels place right-handed pitcher Chase Silseth on the 15-day injured list due to Right Elbow Inflammation.
April 8th	Angels designated Liván Soto for assignment
April 8th	Angels place right-handed pitcher Guillermo Zuñiga on the 15-day injured list due to Right pectoral strain
April 8th	Angels designated Zach Plesac for assignment

== Roster ==
2024 Los Angeles Angels
Roster
Pitchers: 66 Samuel Aldegheri; 31 Tyler Anderson; 53 Mike Baumann; 46 Brock Burke; 47 Griffin Canning; 90 Adam Cimber; 67 José Cisnero; 57 Roansy Contreras; 52 Hans Crouse; 36 Johnny Cueto; 36 Caden Dana; 58 Davis Daniel; 48 Reid Detmers; 53 Carlos Estévez; 41 Carson Fulmer; 66 Luis García; 32 Amir Garrett; 44 Ben Joyce; 64 Jack Kochanowicz; 72 Zac Kristofak; 68 José Marte; 62 Víctor Mederos; 53 Ryan Miller; 55 Matt Moore; 34 Zach Plesac; 65 José Quijada; 78 Kenny Rosenberg; 43 Patrick Sandoval; 63 Chase Silseth; 59 José Soriano; 61 Hunter Strickland; 54 José Suárez; 60 Andrew Wantz; 56 Ryan Zeferjahn; 49 Guillermo Zuñiga	Catchers: 14 Logan O'Hoppe; 21 Matt Thaiss; Infielders: 13 Ehire Adrianza; 5 Willie Calhoun; 23 Brandon Drury; 28 Niko Goodrum; 15 Luis Guillorme; 13 Keston Hiura; 28 Niko Kavadas; 33 Charles Leblanc; 10 Jack López; 9 Zach Neto; 19 Kyren Paris; 6 Anthony Rendon; 2 Luis Rengifo; 22 Miguel Sanó; 18 Nolan Schanuel; 38 Michael Stefanic; 34 Eric Wagaman	Outfielders: 39 Jordyn Adams; 7 Jo Adell; 51 Gustavo Campero; 12 Aaron Hicks; 16 Mickey Moniak; 12 Kevin Pillar; 22 Bryce Teodosio; 27 Mike Trout; 8 Cole Tucker; 3 Taylor Ward	Manager: 37 Ron Washington; Coaches: 91 Mike Ashman (batting practice pitcher); 93 Jason Brown (bullpen catcher); 95 Tim Buss (staff assistant); 84 Barry Enright (pitching); 89 Ryan Goins (infield); 86 Steve Karsay (bullpen); 83 Tim Laker (offensive coordinator); 81 Ray Montgomery (bench); 87 Jerry Narron (catching); 80 Jayson Nix (assistant); 88 Bo Porter (first base); 82 Johnny Washington (hitting); 85 Eric Young Sr. (third base)

== Player stats ==
= Indicates team leader

= Indicates league leader

=== Batting ===
Note: G = Games played; AB = At bats; R = Runs scored; H = Hits; 2B = Doubles; 3B = Triples; HR = Home runs; RBI = Runs batted in; SB = Stolen bases; BB = Walks; AVG = Batting average; SLG = Slugging average

Player	G	AB	R	H	2B	3B	HR	RBI	SB	BB	AVG	SLG
Taylor Ward	156	585	73	144	26	2	25	75	6	63	.246	.426
Zach Neto	155	542	70	135	34	1	23	77	30	39	.249	.443
Nolan Schanuel	147	519	62	130	19	0	13	54	10	68	.250	.362
Logan O'Hoppe	136	479	64	117	17	1	20	56	2	33	.244	.409
Jo Adell	130	405	54	84	15	2	20	62	15	35	.207	.402
Mickey Moniak	124	392	48	86	17	2	14	49	8	21	.219	.380
Brandon Drury	97	325	28	55	7	0	4	15	1	27	.169	.228
Luis Rengifo	78	283	41	85	13	1	6	30	24	16	.300	.417
Kevin Pillar	83	259	37	61	14	1	7	41	10	12	.236	.378
Willie Calhoun	68	229	26	56	16	0	5	20	0	23	.245	.380
Anthony Rendon	57	206	21	45	10	0	0	14	6	23	.218	.267
Matt Thaiss	57	157	14	32	9	0	2	16	3	28	.204	.299
Michael Stefanic	40	110	8	24	4	0	0	8	0	10	.218	.255
Mike Trout	29	109	17	24	1	2	10	14	6	16	.220	.541
Luis Guillorme	50	104	6	24	5	1	0	3	1	11	.231	.298
Niko Kavadas	30	93	11	17	2	0	4	8	1	11	.183	.333
Miguel Sanó	28	83	9	17	3	0	2	6	0	9	.205	.313
Eric Wagaman	18	72	6	18	5	0	2	10	0	2	.250	.403
Jack López	27	67	4	17	3	0	1	6	0	2	.254	.343
Aaron Hicks	18	57	6	8	0	0	1	5	0	6	.140	.193
Kyren Paris	21	51	4	6	2	0	1	5	1	7	.118	.216
Cole Tucker	24	50	3	9	4	1	0	3	3	6	.180	.300
Gustavo Campero	13	46	6	11	0	1	1	6	3	0	.239	.348
Jordyn Adams	11	35	4	8	0	0	1	4	2	3	.229	.314
Keston Hiura	10	27	1	4	0	0	0	1	0	0	.148	.148
Ehire Adrianza	8	26	4	5	1	0	1	2	0	2	.192	.346
Charles Leblanc	11	21	6	4	0	0	2	6	0	7	.190	.476
Niko Goodrum	4	13	1	0	0	0	0	0	1	2	.000	.000
Bryce Teodosio	5	12	1	1	0	0	0	0	0	0	.083	.083
Team totals	162	5357	635	1227	227	15	165	596	133	482	.229	.369

Source:Baseball Reference

=== Pitching ===
Note: W = Wins; L = Losses; ERA = Earned run average; G = Games pitched; GS = Games started; SV = Saves; IP = Innings pitched; H = Hits allowed; R = Runs allowed; ER = Earned runs allowed; BB = Walks allowed; SO = Strikeouts

Player	W	L	ERA	G	GS	SV	IP	H	R	ER	BB	SO
Tyler Anderson	10	15	3.81	31	31	0	179.1	158	83	76	73	142
Griffin Canning	6	13	5.19	32	31	0	171.2	174	105	99	66	130
José Soriano	6	7	3.42	22	20	0	113.0	91	50	43	45	97
Reid Detmers	4	9	6.70	17	17	0	87.1	98	67	65	38	109
Carson Fulmer	0	5	4.15	37	8	0	86.2	81	45	40	40	81
Patrick Sandoval	2	8	5.08	16	16	0	79.2	85	49	45	35	81
Hunter Strickland	3	2	3.31	72	0	1	73.1	56	31	27	24	57
Jack Kochanowicz	2	6	3.99	11	11	0	65.1	68	30	29	10	25
José Suárez	1	2	6.02	22	3	1	52.1	57	38	35	27	56
Roansy Contreras	1	4	4.33	37	3	2	52.0	44	28	25	23	40
Matt Moore	5	3	5.03	51	0	1	48.1	39	31	27	26	41
Luis García	5	1	3.71	45	0	4	43.2	37	21	18	14	40
Ben Joyce	2	0	2.08	31	1	4	34.2	26	8	8	14	33
Carlos Estévez	1	3	2.38	34	0	20	34.0	20	10	9	5	32
Davis Daniel	1	4	6.23	6	6	0	30.1	39	22	21	6	28
Hans Crouse	4	3	2.84	25	0	0	25.1	14	10	8	17	34
Adam Cimber	3	0	7.03	28	0	0	24.1	20	19	19	14	19
Kenny Rosenberg	0	1	6.00	7	1	0	24.0	28	17	16	8	17
Brock Burke	2	1	3.54	21	1	0	20.1	16	8	8	7	25
José Quijada	2	2	3.26	22	0	0	19.1	12	9	7	17	24
José Marte	0	0	2.33	14	0	0	19.1	14	6	5	10	14
Guillermo Zuñiga	0	0	5.09	15	0	2	17.2	16	10	10	8	12
Ryan Zeferjahn	0	0	2.12	12	0	0	17.0	7	4	4	6	18
José Cisnero	0	0	6.89	15	0	0	15.2	18	15	12	8	17
Samuel Aldegheri	1	2	4.85	3	3	0	13.0	15	12	7	10	10
Ryan Miller	0	1	4.15	13	0	0	13.0	13	7	6	8	11
Zach Plesac	1	1	8.25	3	3	0	12.0	12	11	11	7	5
Johnny Cueto	0	2	7.15	2	2	0	11.1	14	9	9	3	6
Caden Dana	1	2	9.58	3	3	0	10.1	14	12	11	7	8
Mike Baumann	0	0	6.75	10	0	0	9.1	14	8	7	4	7
Chase Silseth	0	1	6.75	2	2	0	8.0	8	7	6	4	12
Victor Mederos	0	1	11.81	4	0	0	5.1	7	7	7	6	5
Amir Garrett	0	0	5.06	6	0	0	5.1	4	3	3	5	11
Zac Kristofak	0	0	0.00	1	0	0	2.0	3	2	0	2	2
Luis Guillorme	0	0	0.00	2	0	0	2.0	1	0	0	1	0
Andrew Wantz	0	0	6.75	1	0	0	1.1	1	1	1	1	3
Cole Tucker	0	0	0.00	1	0	0	1.0	1	0	0	1	0
Michael Stefanic	0	0	0.00	1	0	0	1.0	1	0	0	0	0
Aaron Hicks	0	0	18.00	1	0	0	1.0	2	2	2	1	0
Miguel Sanó	0	0	0.00	1	0	0	0.1	0	0	0	0	0
Team totals	63	99	4.56	162	162	35	1431.0	1328	797	725	601	1252

Source:Baseball Reference

== Opening Day lineup ==
The team opened up the season on the road at Baltimore on March 28, losing 11–3.

Order	No.	Player	Pos.
1	6	Anthony Rendon	3B
2	12	Aaron Hicks	RF
3	27	Mike Trout	CF
4	3	Taylor Ward	LF
5	23	Brandon Drury	2B
6	18	Nolan Schanuel	1B
7	22	Miguel Sanó	DH
8	14	Logan O'Hoppe	C
9	9	Zach Neto	SS
—	43	Patrick Sandoval	P

=== Angels team leaders ===
Batting
Batting average	Nolan Schanuel	.250
RBIs	Zach Neto	77
Stolen bases	Zach Neto	30
Runs scored	Taylor Ward	73
Home runs	Taylor Ward	25
Games played	Taylor Ward	156
Pitching
ERA	Tyler Anderson	3.81
WHIP	Tyler Anderson	1.29
Holds	Hunter Strickland	12
Wins	Tyler Anderson	10
Innings pitched	Tyler Anderson	179.1
Strikeouts	Tyler Anderson	142
Saves	Carlos Estévez	20
Games pitched	Hunter Strickland	72

== Game log ==
The Angels opened the 2024 season on the road at Baltimore and lost 11–3.

Legend
	Angels win
	Angels loss
	All-Star Game
	Postponement
	Eliminated from playoff race
**Bold**	Angels team member

2024 Game Log: 63–99 (Home: 32–49; Away: 31–50)
March/April: 11–19 (Home: 4–10; Away: 7–9)

#	Date	Opponent	Score	Win	Loss	Save	Attendance	Record	Streak
1	March 28	@ Orioles	3–11	Burnes (1–0)	**Sandoval** (0–1)	—	45,029	0–1	L1
2	March 30	@ Orioles	4–13	Rodriguez (1–0)	**Canning** (0–1)	—	28,420	0–2	L2
3	March 31	@ Orioles	4–1	**Detmers** (1–0)	Wells (0–1)	**Estévez** (1)	20,576	1–2	W1
4	April 1	@ Marlins	7–4	**Cimber** (1–0)	Scott (0–2)	**Estévez** (2)	9,411	2–2	W2
5	April 2	@ Marlins	3–1	**Anderson** (1–0)	Luzardo (0–1)	**García** (1)	9,033	3–2	W3
6	April 3	@ Marlins	10–2	**Sandoval** (1–1)	Puk (0–2)	**Zuñiga** (1)	8,573	4–2	W4
7	April 5	Red Sox	6–8	Martin (1–0)	**Soriano** (0–1)	Jansen (3)	44,714	4–3	L1
8	April 6	Red Sox	2–1	**Detmers** (2–0)	Weissert (0–1)	**Estévez** (3)	44,485	5–3	W1
9	April 7	Red Sox	2–12	Houck (2–0)	**Silseth** (0–1)	Anderson (2)	38,917	5–4	L1
10	April 8	Rays	7–1	**Anderson** (2–0)	Eflin (1–2)	—	18,748	6–4	W1
11	April 9	Rays	4–6	Civale (2–1)	**Sandoval** (1–2)	Fairbanks (1)	20,271	6–5	L1
12	April 10	Rays	2–4	Kelly (1–0)	**Soriano** (0–2)	Fairbanks (2)	16,600	6–6	L2
13	April 12	@ Red Sox	7–0	**Detmers** (3–0)	Houck (2–1)	—	26,106	7–6	W1
14	April 13	@ Red Sox	2–7	Weissert (1–1)	**Canning** (0–2)	—	31,878	7–7	L1
15	April 14	@ Red Sox	4–5	Bello (2–1)	**Anderson** (2–1)	Jansen (4)	30,792	7–8	L2
16	April 15	@ Rays	7–3	**García** (1–0)	Maton (0–1)	—	12,267	8–8	W1
17	April 16	@ Rays	6–7 (13)	Cleavinger (3–0)	**Fulmer** (0–1)	—	12,160	8–9	L1
18	April 17	@ Rays	5–4	**Strickland** (1–0)	Fairbanks (0–2)	—	10,844	9–9	W1
19	April 18	@ Rays	1–2	Pepiot (2–2)	**Canning** (0–3)	Poche (2)	10,648	9–10	L1
20	April 19	@ Reds	1–7	Lodolo (2–0)	**Anderson** (2–2)	—	22,539	9–11	L2
21	April 20	@ Reds	5–7	Ashcraft (3–1)	**Sandoval** (1–3)	Díaz (3)	27,343	9–12	L3
22	April 21	@ Reds	0–3	Pagán (2–1)	**Soriano** (0–3)	Díaz (4)	25,935	9–13	L4
23	April 22	Orioles	2–4	Suárez (1–0)	**Detmers** (3–1)	Kimbrel (6)	26,081	9–14	L5
24	April 23	Orioles	7–4	**Canning** (1–3)	Rodriguez (3–1)	**Estévez** (4)	22,803	10–14	W1
25	April 24	Orioles	5–6	Kremer (1–2)	**Anderson** (2–3)	Kimbrel (7)	19,557	10–15	L1
26	April 26	Twins	3–5	Ober (2–1)	**Sandoval** (1–4)	Thielbar (1)	31,087	10–16	L2
27	April 27	Twins	5–16	Paddack (2–1)	**Soriano** (0–4)	—	44,478	10–17	L3
28	April 28	Twins	5–11	López (2–2)	**Detmers** (3–2)	—	38,955	10–18	L4
29	April 29	Phillies	6–5	**Cimber** (2–0)	Domínguez (1–2)	**Estévez** (5)	25,449	11–18	W1
30	April 30	Phillies	5–7	Alvarado (1–1)	**Estévez** (0–1)	Hoffman (2)	23,949	11–19	L1

May: 10–17 (Home: 3–11; Away: 7–6)

#	Date	Opponent	Score	Win	Loss	Save	Attendance	Record	Streak
31	May 1	Phillies	1–2	Wheeler (3–3)	**Sandoval** (1–5)	Soto (2)	20,156	11–20	L2
32	May 3	@ Guardians	6–0	**Soriano** (1–4)	Bibee (2–1)	—	19,698	12–20	W1
33	May 4	@ Guardians	1–7	Lively (1–1)	**Detmers** (3–3)	—	26,292	12–21	L1
34	May 5	@ Guardians	1–4	Carrasco (2–2)	**Canning** (1–4)	Clase (10)	19,579	12–22	L2
35	May 6	@ Pirates	1–4	Keller (3–3)	**Anderson** (2–4)	—	9,506	12–23	L3
36	May 7	@ Pirates	9–0	**Sandoval** (2–5)	Priester (0–3)	—	10,844	13–23	W1
37	May 8	@ Pirates	5–4	**Cimber** (3–0)	Ortiz (2–2)	**Estévez** (6)	15,213	14–23	W2
38	May 9	Royals	4–10	Wacha (2–4)	**Detmers** (3–4)	—	23,568	14–24	L1
39	May 10	Royals	1–2	Duffey (1–2)	**Estévez** (0–2)	Schreiber (1)	29,126	14–25	L2
40	May 11	Royals	9–3	**Anderson** (3–4)	Ragans (2–3)	—	31,593	15–25	W1
41	May 12	Royals	2–4	Lugo (6–1)	**Sandoval** (2–6)	McArthur (9)	27,723	15–26	L1
42	May 13	Cardinals	5–10	Leahy (1–1)	**Moore** (0–1)	—	22,814	15–27	L2
43	May 14	Cardinals	6–7	Gray (5–2)	**Strickland** (1–1)	Helsley (13)	21,490	15–28	L3
44	May 15	Cardinals	7–2	**Canning** (2–4)	Lynn (1–2)	—	21,961	16–28	W1
45	May 17	@ Rangers	9–3	**Anderson** (4–4)	Heaney (0–5)	—	37,922	17–28	W2
46	May 18	@ Rangers	2–3 (13)	Rodríguez (1–0)	**Fulmer** (0–2)	—	36,457	17–29	L1
47	May 19	@ Rangers	4–1	**Soriano** (2–4)	Lorenzen (2–3)	**García** (2)	36,009	18–29	W1
48	May 20	@ Astros	9–7	**Suárez** (1–0)	Valdez (3–2)	**Estévez** (7)	29,821	19–29	W2
49	May 21	@ Astros	5–6 (10)	Hader (3–3)	**Estévez** (0–3)	—	30,891	19–30	L1
50	May 22	@ Astros	2–1	**Anderson** (5–4)	Brown (1–5)	**García** (3)	30,599	20–30	W1
51	May 24	Guardians	4–10	Allen (6–2)	**Sandoval** (2–7)	—	37,618	20–31	L1
52	May 25	Guardians	3–4	Bibee (3–1)	**Soriano** (2–5)	Clase (16)	35,861	20–32	L2
53	May 26	Guardians	4–5	Lively (4–2)	**Detmers** (3–5)	Clase (17)	38,741	20–33	L3
54	May 28	Yankees	4–3	**Moore** (1–1)	Weaver (3–1)	**Estévez** (8)	34,894	21–33	W1
55	May 29	Yankees	1–2	Gil (7–1)	**Anderson** (5–5)	Holmes (16)	34,313	21–34	L1
56	May 30	Yankees	3–8	Rodón (7–2)	**Sandoval** (2–8)	—	36,312	21–35	L2
57	May 31	@ Mariners	4–5	Stanek (3–0)	**Moore** (1–2)	Muñoz (12)	40,001	21–36	L3

June: 15–11 (Home: 11–5; Away: 4–6)

#	Date	Opponent	Score	Win	Loss	Save	Attendance	Record	Streak
58	June 1	@ Mariners	0–9	Miller (5–5)	**Detmers** (3–6)	—	39,932	21–37	L4
59	June 2	@ Mariners	1–5	Castillo (5–6)	**Canning** (2–5)	—	35,990	21–38	L5
60	June 3	Padres	2–1	**Strickland** (2–1)	Morejón (1–2)	**Estévez** (9)	32,683	22–38	W1
61	June 4	Padres	4–2	**Moore** (2–2)	Matsui (3–2)	**Estévez** (10)	33,947	23–38	W2
62	June 5	Padres	3–2	**Soriano** (3–5)	Cease (5–5)	**Moore** (1)	31,960	24–38	W3
63	June 7	Astros	1–7	Valdez (5–3)	**Canning** (2–6)	—	36,534	24–39	L1
64	June 8	Astros	1–6	Brown (2–5)	**Anderson** (5–6)	—	38,217	24–40	L2
65	June 9	Astros	9–7	**Estévez** (1–3)	Hader (3–4)	—	42,703	25–40	W1
66	June 11	@ Diamondbacks	4–9	Montgomery (4–4)	**Suárez** (1–1)	—	20,972	25–41	L1
67	June 12	@ Diamondbacks	8–3	**Soriano** (4–5)	Cecconi (1–5)	—	19,691	26–41	W1
68	June 13	@ Diamondbacks	1–11	Pfaadt (3–5)	**Canning** (2–7)	—	18,185	26–42	L1
69	June 14	@ Giants	8–6	**Anderson** (6–6)	Howard (0–1)	**Estévez** (11)	32,842	27–42	W1
70	June 15	@ Giants	4–3	**Moore** (3–2)	Walker (4–3)	**Estévez** (12)	36,235	28–42	W2
71	June 16	@ Giants	6–13	Bivens (1–0)	**Suárez** (1–2)	—	41,008	28–43	L1
72	June 17	Brewers	5–3	**Plesac** (1–0)	Rodríguez (0–2)	**Estévez** (13)	26,575	29–43	W1
73	June 18	Brewers	3–6	Myers (4–2)	**Canning** (2–8)	Megill (14)	27,967	29–44	L1
74	June 19	Brewers	0–2	Peralta (5–4)	**Anderson** (6–7)	Megill (15)	28,483	29–45	L2
75	June 21	@ Dodgers	3–2 (10)	**García** (2–0)	Phillips (0–1)	**Estévez** (14)	51,841	30–45	W1
76	June 22	@ Dodgers	2–7	Glasnow (8–5)	**Plesac** (1–1)	—	53,273	30–46	L1
77	June 24	Athletics	5–1	**Canning** (3–8)	Medina (1–3)	—	24,586	31–46	W1
78	June 25	Athletics	7–5	**Anderson** (7–7)	Spence (4–4)	**Estévez** (15)	26,473	32–46	W2
79	June 26	Athletics	5–2	**Moore** (4–2)	Estes (2–3)	—	31,240	33–46	W3
80	June 27	Tigers	5–0	**Daniel** (1–0)	Flaherty (5–5)	—	27,340	34–46	W4
81	June 28	Tigers	5–2	**García** (3–0)	Miller (4–6)	**Estévez** (16)	34,381	35–46	W5
82	June 29	Tigers	6–5 (10)	**Joyce** (1–0)	Foley (2–2)	—	39,559	36–46	W6
83	June 30	Tigers	6–7	Mize (2–6)	**Anderson** (7–8)	Holton (2)	35,061	36–47	L1

July: 11–14 (Home: 6–7; Away: 5–7)

#	Date	Opponent	Score	Win	Loss	Save	Attendance	Record	Streak
84	July 2	@ Athletics	5–7	Spence (5–4)	**Soriano** (4–6)	—	5,447	36–48	L2
85	July 3	@ Athletics	0–5	Estes (3–3)	**Daniel** (1–1)	—	14,837	36–49	L3
86	July 4	@ Athletics	0–5	Sears (5–7)	**Contreras** (1–1)	—	11,956	36–50	L4
87	July 5	@ Cubs	1–5	Steele (1–3)	**Canning** (3–9)	—	36,948	36–51	L5
88	July 6	@ Cubs	7–0	**Anderson** (8–8)	Hendricks (1–7)	—	36,420	37–51	W1
89	July 7	@ Cubs	0–5	Wesneski (3–5)	**Soriano** (4–7)	Neris (12)	34,355	37–52	L1
90	July 8	Rangers	4–9	Gray (4–4)	**Daniel** (1–2)	—	25,193	37–53	L2
91	July 9	Rangers	4–5	Leclerc (4–4)	**García** (3–1)	Yates (14)	23,791	37–54	L3
92	July 10	Rangers	7–2	**Crouse** (1–0)	Lorenzen (5–5)	—	23,230	38–54	W1
93	July 11	Mariners	0–11	Castillo (8–9)	**Kochanowicz** (0–1)	—	26,747	38–55	L1
94	July 12	Mariners	6–5 (10)	**Crouse** (2–0)	Voth (2–3)	—	31,243	39–55	W1
95	July 13	Mariners	2–1	**Soriano** (5–7)	Kirby (7–7)	**Estévez** (17)	43,273	40–55	W2
96	July 14	Mariners	3–2	**Crouse** (3–0)	Voth (2–4)	**Contreras** (1)	26,015	41–55	W3
ASG	July 16	NL @ AL	3–5	Miller (1–0)	Greene (0–1)	Clase (1)	39,343	—	N/A
97	July 19	@ Athletics	3–13	Sears (7–7)	**Canning** (3–10)	—	11,596	41–56	L1
98	July 20	@ Athletics	2–8	Spence (6–6)	**Kochanowicz** (0–2)	—	14,574	41–57	L2
99	July 21	@ Athletics	8–5	**García** (4–1)	Erceg (2–3)	**Estévez** (18)	10,380	42–57	W1
100	July 22	@ Mariners	3–1	**García** (5–1)	Thornton (3–2)	**Estévez** (19)	22,528	43–57	W2
101	July 23	@ Mariners	5–1	**Soriano** (6–7)	Gilbert (6–6)	—	26,496	44–57	W3
102	July 24	@ Mariners	2–1	**Crouse** (4–0)	Santos (0–1)	**Estévez** (20)	39,953	45–57	W4
103	July 25	Athletics	5–6	Stripling (2–9)	**Rosenberg** (0–1)	Ferguson (1)	25,752	45–58	L1
104	July 26	Athletics	4–5	Blackburn (4–2)	**Crouse** (4–1)	Erceg (3)	28,722	45–59	L2
105	July 27	Athletics	1–3	Spence (7–6)	**Anderson** (8–9)	Ferguson (2)	33,755	45–60	L3
106	July 28	Athletics	8–6	**Contreras** (2–1)	Bido (2–2)	**García** (4)	27,016	46–60	W1
107	July 30	Rockies	10–7	**Quijada** (1–0)	Bird (1–2)	**Strickland** (1)	25,241	47–60	W2
108	July 31	Rockies	1–2	Freeland (3–4)	**Crouse** (4–2)	Vodnik (4)	23,658	47–61	L1

August: 9–19 (Home: 4–8; Away: 5–11)

#	Date	Opponent	Score	Win	Loss	Save	Attendance	Record	Streak
109	August 1	Rockies	4–5 (10)	Vodnik (3–1)	**Crouse** (4–3)	Kinley (6)	27,335	47–62	L2
110	August 2	Mets	1–5	Blackburn (5–2)	**Anderson** (8–10)	—	37,012	47–63	L3
111	August 3	Mets	5–4	**Moore** (5–2)	Brazobán (1–3)	**Joyce** (1)	36,377	48–63	W1
112	August 4	Mets	3–2	**Canning** (4–10)	Quintana (6–7)	**Contreras** (2)	37,811	49–63	W2
—	August 6	@ Yankees	Postponed (rain); Makeup: August 7						
113	August 7 (1)	@ Yankees	2–5	Gil (12–5)	**Daniel** (1–3)	Holmes (24)	see 2nd game	49–64	L1
114	August 7 (2)	@ Yankees	8–2	**Strickland** (3–1)	Warren (0–1)	—	40,744	50–64	W1
115	August 8	@ Yankees	9–4	**Anderson** (9–10)	Cortés Jr. (5–10)	—	40,681	51–64	W2
116	August 9	@ Nationals	2–3 (10)	Finnegan (3–5)	**Moore** (5–3)	—	22,333	51–65	L1
117	August 10	@ Nationals	4–5 (10)	Law (7–2)	**Contreras** (2–2)	—	22,183	51–66	L2
118	August 11	@ Nationals	6–3	**Kochanowicz** (1–2)	Gore (7–10)	—	25,456	52–66	W1
119	August 12	Blue Jays	2–4	Francis (5–3)	**Daniel** (1–4)	Green (12)	29,676	52–67	L1
120	August 13	Blue Jays	1–6	Gausman (11–8)	**Fulmer** (0–3)	—	30,982	52–68	L2
121	August 14	Blue Jays	2–9	Berríos (11–9)	**Anderson** (9–11)	—	28,356	52–69	L3
122	August 16	Braves	3–2	**Burke** (1–0)	Schwellenbach (4–3)	**Joyce** (2)	37,736	53–69	W1
123	August 17	Braves	3–11	Sale (14–3)	**Canning** (4–11)	—	37,268	53–70	L1
124	August 18	Braves	1–3	Morton (7–7)	**Kochanowicz** (1–3)	Iglesias (26)	36,102	53–71	L2
125	August 19	@ Royals	3–5	Lugo (14–7)	**Fulmer** (0–4)	Schreiber (2)	15,091	53–72	L3
126	August 20	@ Royals	9–5	**Anderson** (10–11)	Ragans (10–8)	—	16,310	54–72	W1
127	August 21	@ Royals	0–3	Lorenzen (7–6)	**Cueto** (0–1)	Erceg (6)	13,009	54–73	L1
128	August 22	@ Blue Jays	3–5	Yarbrough (5–2)	**Burke** (1–1)	—	25,900	54–74	L2
129	August 23	@ Blue Jays	4–5	Green (4–3)	**Contreras** (2–3)	—	25,431	54–75	L3
130	August 24	@ Blue Jays	1–3	Francis (7–3)	**Fulmer** (0–5)	Green (14)	34,011	54–76	L4
131	August 25	@ Blue Jays	2–8	Gausman (12–9)	**Anderson** (10–12)	—	37,036	54–77	L5
132	August 27	@ Tigers	2–6	Hurter (2–1)	**Cueto** (0–2)	Foley (18)	18,258	54–78	L6
133	August 28	@ Tigers	2–3	Maeda (3–6)	**Canning** (4–12)	Foley (19)	16,303	54–79	L7
134	August 29	@ Tigers	3–0	**Kochanowicz** (2–3)	Montero (4–6)	**Joyce** (3)	16,119	55–79	W1
135	August 30	Mariners	5–9	Kirby (10–10)	**Aldegheri** (0–1)	—	34,435	55–80	L1
136	August 31	Mariners	5–4	**Joyce** (2–0)	Muñoz (2–6)	—	34,253	56–80	W1

September: 7–19 (Home: 4–8; Away: 3–11)

#	Date	Opponent	Score	Win	Loss	Save	Attendance	Record	Streak
137	September 1	Mariners	3–2	**Dana** (1–0)	Miller (10–8)	**Joyce** (4)	39,370	57–80	W2
138	September 3	Dodgers	2–6 (10)	Kopech (5–8)	**Contreras** (2–4)	—	44,731	57–81	L1
139	September 4	Dodgers	10–1	**Canning** (5–12)	Miller (2–4)	—	44,822	58–81	W1
140	September 5	@ Rangers	1–3	Bradford (5–2)	**Kochanowicz** (2–4)	Yates (27)	22,926	58–82	L1
141	September 6	@ Rangers	5–1	**Aldegheri** (1–1)	Garabito (0–2)	—	31,014	59–82	W1
142	September 7	@ Rangers	4–6	Leclerc (6–4)	**Mederos** (0–1)	Yates (28)	31,501	59–83	L1
143	September 8	@ Rangers	4–7	Heaney (5–13)	**Dana** (1–1)	Yates (29)	32,240	59–84	L2
144	September 9	@ Twins	6–2	**Detmers** (4–6)	Festa (2–6)	**Suárez** (1)	14,445	60–84	W1
145	September 10	@ Twins	5–10	López (15–8)	**Canning** (5–13)	—	18,311	60–85	L1
146	September 11	@ Twins	4–6	Sands (7–1)	**Kochanowicz** (2–5)	Durán (23)	15,660	60–86	L2
147	September 13	Astros	3–5	Kikuchi (9–9)	**Aldegheri** (1–2)	Hader (30)	36,226	60–87	L3
148	September 14	Astros	3–5	Verlander (4–6)	**Anderson** (10–13)	Pressly (4)	39,880	60–88	L4
149	September 15	Astros	4–6	Blanco (11–6)	**Dana** (1–2)	Hader (31)	41,005	60–89	L5
150	September 16	White Sox	4–8	Cannon (4–10)	**Detmers** (4–7)	—	35,587	60–90	L6
151	September 17	White Sox	5–0	**Canning** (6–13)	Martin (0–5)	—	36,254	61–90	W1
152	September 18	White Sox	4–3 (13)	**Quijada** (2–0)	Iriarte (0–1)	—	22,757	62–90	W2
153	September 19	@ Astros	1–3	Abreu (3–3)	**Miller** (0–1)	Hader (32)	33,107	62–91	L1
154	September 20	@ Astros	7–9	Neris (10–5)	**Anderson** (10–14)	Hader (33)	39,666	62–92	L2
155	September 21	@ Astros	4–10	Blanco (12–6)	**Detmers** (4–8)	—	40,502	62–93	L3
156	September 22	@ Astros	9–8	**Burke** (1–0)	Hader (8–8)	**Zuñiga** (2)	39,631	63–93	W1
157	September 24	@ White Sox	2–3	Berroa (1–0)	**Strickland** (3–2)	Anderson (1)	17,606	63–94	L1
158	September 25	@ White Sox	3–4 (10)	Shuster (2–4)	**Quijada** (2–1)	—	18,423	63–95	L2
159	September 26	@ White Sox	0–7	Flexen (3–15)	**Anderson** (10–15)	—	15,678	63–96	L3
160	September 27	Rangers	2–5	Robert (1–0)	**Detmers** (4–9)	Yates (32)	39,308	63–97	L4
161	September 28	Rangers	8–9	Dunning (5–7)	**Quijada** (2–2)	Yates (33)	41,560	63–98	L5
162	September 29	Rangers	0–8	Eovaldi (12–8)	**Kochanowicz** (2–6)	—	35,145	63–99	L6

=== Grand slams ===
No.	Date	Angels batter	Score	H/A	Pitcher	Opposing team
1	May 31st	Jo Adell	4–4	A	Tayler Saucedo	Seattle Mariners
2	July 28th	Taylor Ward	6–4	H	Osvaldo Bido	Oakland Athletics

== Farm system ==
Level	Team	League	Manager
AAA	Salt Lake Bees	Pacific Coast League	
AA	Rocket City Trash Pandas	Southern League	
A	Tri-City Dust Devils	Northwest League	
A-Advanced	Inland Empire 66ers	California League	
Rookie	ACL Angels	Arizona Complex League	
Rookie	DSL Angels	Dominican Summer League	

All coaches and rosters can be found on each team's website.

=== Major League Baseball draft ===
Below are the Angels' picks from 2024 Major League Baseball draft. Players who reached MLB are in bold.

Los Angeles Angels 2024 draft picks

Round	Pick	Name	Age	Position	School	Signing bonus
1	8	**Christian Moore**	21	2B	University of Tennessee	$4,997,500
2	45	Chris Cortez	21	P	Texas A&M University	$1,597,500
2C	74	**Ryan Johnson**	21	P	Dallas Baptist University	$1,747,500
3	81	Ryan Prager	21	P	Texas A&M University	Not signed
4	110	Austin Gordon	21	P	Clemson University	$572,500
5	143	Dylan Jordan	18	P	Viera High School (FL)	$1,247,500
6	172	Peyton Olejnik	21	P	Miami University	$197,500
7	202	Bridger Holmes	21	P	Oregon State University	$215,000
8	232	Randy Flores	23	SS	Alabama State University	$1,000
9	262	Derek Clark	22	P	West Virginia University	$1,000
10	292	Ryan Nicholson	23	1B	University of Kentucky	$1,000
11	322	Trey Gregory-Alford	18	P	Coronado High School (CO)	$1,957,500
12	352	Fran Oschell III	21	P	Fresno Pacific University	$150,000
13	382	Fulton Lockhart	20	P	University of Central Florida	$150,000
14	412	Najer Victor	22	P	University of Central Florida	$150,000
15	442	Bailan Caraballo	18	OF	Reborn Christian Academy (FL)	$150,000
16	472	Will Gervase	22	P	Wake Forest University	$150,000
17	502	Lucas Ramirez	18	OF	American Heritage High School (FL)	$150,000
18	532	David Mershon	21	SS	Mississippi State University	$405,000
19	562	Connor Gatwood	18	P	Baker High School (AL)	Not signed
20	592	Zachary Redner	19	P	Hillsborough Community College (FL)	$150,000

== See also ==
- Los Angeles Angels
- Angel Stadium

Records
Preceded by 2023	Los Angeles Angels seasons 2024	Succeeded by 2025
