= Nimmala =

Nimmala is a Telugu surname. Notable people with the surname include:

- Arjun Nimmala (born 2005), American baseball player
- Kristappa Nimmala (born 1956), Indian politician
- Nimmala Rama Naidu (born 1969), Indian politician
