= Patrick Sandoval =

American baseball player (born 1996)

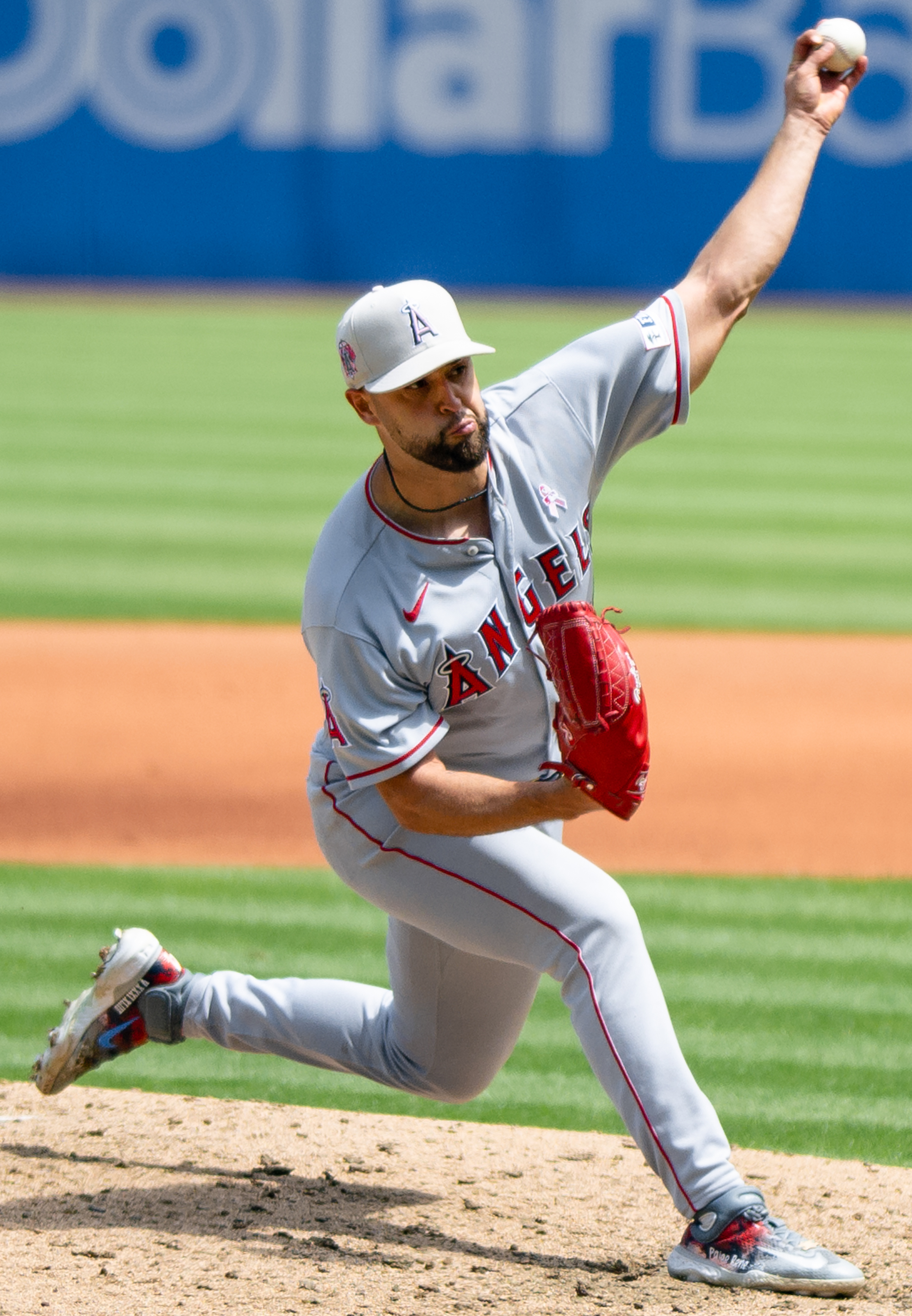
- Sandoval with the Los Angeles Angels in 2023

Free agent
- Pitcher
- Born: October 18, 1996 (age 30); Mission Viejo, California, U.S.
- Bats: Left Throws: Left

MLB debut
- August 5, 2019, for the Los Angeles Angels

MLB statistics (through 2026 season)
- Win–loss record: 20–52
- Earned run average: 4.14
- Strikeouts: 602
- Stats at Baseball Reference

Teams
- Los Angeles Angels (2019–2024); Boston Red Sox (2026)

Career highlights and awards
- All-World Baseball Classic Team (2023)
Medals
Men's baseball
Representing Mexico
World Baseball Classic
Bronze medal – third place	2023 Miami	Team

Patrick Jordan Sandoval (born October 18, 1996) is an American professional baseball pitcher who is a free agent. He has previously played in Major League Baseball (MLB) for the Los Angeles Angels and Boston Red Sox.

Sandoval was born and raised in the Orange County city of Mission Viejo, California. He attended Mission Viejo High School, where he was a multi-sport athlete and became a notable baseball prospect with selections to all-county and all-league teams. Initially committed to play college baseball for Vanderbilt University and later for the University of Southern California, Sandoval forewent college when he was drafted by the Houston Astros in the 11th round of the 2015 MLB draft.

After spending multiple seasons in the Astros farm system, Sandoval was traded to the Los Angeles Angels for Martín Maldonado in 2018. He made his major league debut in 2019 and spent his first two brief seasons alternating between the starting rotation and the bullpen. Sandoval began 2021 as a reliever but was moved into the starting rotation shortly thereafter. On August 19, 2022, he threw a shutout at Comerica Park on 97 pitches, becoming the first Angels player in six seasons to throw a Maddux. Sandoval pitched for the Mexico national baseball team during the 2023 World Baseball Classic and earned All-WBC honors.

== Early life ==
Patrick Sandoval was born on October 18, 1996, in Mission Viejo, California, to Jorge, originally from Mexico City, and Robin. He grew up attending Angels games at Angel Stadium and his favorite player was then-Cardinals first baseman and eventual Angels teammate Albert Pujols, doing a book report on his biography in the third grade and emulating his batting stance in Little League. When he was 8 years old, Sandoval was a member of an Angels-themed Little League team and tried pitching for the first time that year.

Sandoval attended Mission Viejo High School, where he played baseball and football as a punter. In 2013, his sophomore season, Sandoval posted a 7–5 record and a 2.58 earned run average (ERA).

As a junior, the Orange County Register named Sandoval as a top player in the county to watch during the 2014 season, alongside eventual major leaguers such as Griffin Canning and Kolby Allard. He gained further media attention on April 30 for throwing a two-hit shutout against Capistrano Valley High School to aid Mission Viejo in its CIF Southern Section (CIF-SS) playoff hunt and improve his season stats to a 6–2 record with a 2.38 ERA. He threw another shutout on May 13, blanking Trabuco Hills High School and receiving praise from his coach for inducing an increased amount of whiffs. At the conclusion of the season, the Register named Sandoval to its All-County second team and he was also selected to the All-CIF-SS first team. On August 10, Sandoval partook in the Perfect Game All-American Classic at Petco Park in San Diego, pitching 2/3 of an inning and recording a strikeout.

In November 2014, his senior year in high school, Sandoval signed his National Letter of Intent to play college baseball for Vanderbilt University. On March 31, 2015, Sandoval threw a two-hit shutout against top-ranked San Clemente High School. On May 11, he switched his collegiate commitment from Vanderbilt to the University of Southern California (USC). Sandoval finished his senior season at 9–3 with a 0.97 ERA. On June 6, Sandoval threw a complete game while giving up two hits and one unearned run to aid Mission Viejo in its 3–1 victory over Chino Hills High School in the CIF-SS Division 2 championship game. Following the season, he was selected to the Register's All-County first team and was named the CIF-SS Division 2 Most Valuable Player.

== Professional career ==
=== Houston Astros ===
The Houston Astros selected Sandoval in the 11th round, with the 319th overall pick, of the 2015 Major League Baseball draft. Sandoval initially signaled intent to eschew his draft selection and attend USC, but he ultimately signed with the Astros after they offered him a $900,000 bonus; at $800,000 over-slot, it was the largest bonus given to a player picked beyond the first 10 rounds of the 2015 draft. Astros scouting director Mike Elias called Sandoval a "premium" prospect and noted that his scouting department had been closely following his development throughout the spring.

After signing, Sandoval made his professional debut that season in the Rookie-level Gulf Coast League (GCL) with the GCL Astros. In his first professional game on August 1, 2015, he pitched two innings while giving up eight hits and five runs (four earned) and striking out three against the GCL Phillies. He finished his first professional season at 0–3 with a 6.08 ERA in six starts. On June 22, 2016, the Astros assigned Sandoval to the Rookie-level Greeneville Astros of the Appalachian League, where he pitched to a 2–3 record and 5.30 ERA in 13 games (eight starts).

On May 14, 2017, Sandoval was promoted to the Class A-Advanced Buies Creek Astros of the Carolina League. In one start with Buies Creek, he surrendered three earned runs across 2 2/3 innings for a 10.13 ERA. On June 19, Sandoval was demoted to the Class A Short Season Tri-City ValleyCats of the New York–Penn League. In four starts with Tri-City, Sandoval went 1–1 with a 3.79 ERA across 19 innings. On July 11, he was promoted to the Single A Quad Cities River Bandits of the Midwest League. Quad Cities primarily used Sandoval as a starter but intermittently used him out of the bullpen. In nine appearances (seven starts), he compiled a 2–2 record with a 3.83 ERA with 48 strikeouts across 40 innings. Between the three teams, Sandoval had a 3–4 record and 4.09 ERA in 14 games (11 starts) and 78 strikeouts. In Game 2 of the 2017 Midwest League Championship Series, Sandoval pitched six scoreless innings to aid the team in its 5–0 victory en route to a sweep of the Fort Wayne TinCaps to win the Midwest League championship.

Sandoval began the 2018 season with Quad Cities and compiled a 7–1 record in 14 games (10 starts) with a 2.49 ERA, 71 strikeouts, and a save across 65 innings. He was named the starting pitcher for the Midwest League All-Star Game. He pitched one inning in the exhibition while giving up two hits and one run. On June 27, Sandoval was promoted to the Buies Creek Astros. He compiled a 33-inning scoreless streak between the two teams spanning from June 3 to July 11. In five games (three starts) with Buies Creek, Sandoval went 2–0 with a 2.74 ERA, 26 strikeouts, and a save in 23 innings.

=== Los Angeles Angels ===
==== 2018–2019: Minor leagues ====
On July 26, 2018, the Astros traded Sandoval and international pool space cash to the Los Angeles Angels in exchange for catcher Martín Maldonado. He was assigned to the Class A-Advanced Inland Empire 66ers of the California League the same day. In three starts with Inland Empire, Sandoval went 1–0 with no runs given up and 21 strikeouts in 14 2/3 innings. On August 16, he was promoted to the Double-A Mobile BayBears of the Southern League. in four starts with Mobile, Sandoval posted a 1–0 record with 1.37 ERA and 27 strikeouts in 19.2 innings. In 26 games (20 starts) between Quad Cities, Buies Creek, Inland Empire, and Mobile, he was 11–1 with a 2.06 ERA, striking out 145 batters in 122 1/3 innings pitched.

Sandoval began the 2019 season with Mobile. On April 14, he set a career-high in strikeouts with 11 in a game against the Mississippi Braves. In five games (four starts) with Mobile, Sandoval posted an 0–3 record with a 3.60 ERA and 32 strikeouts in 20 innings. On May 4, he was promoted to the Triple-A Salt Lake Bees of the Pacific Coast League. In 15 starts with Salt Lake, Sandoval went 4–4 with a 6.41 ERA and 66 strikeouts in 60 1/3 innings. He finished his five-year minor league stint with a 20–18 record, 4.01 ERA, 383 strikeouts, and 330 1/3 innings pitched in 79 games (64 starts).

==== 2019–2021: Major league debut and beginnings ====
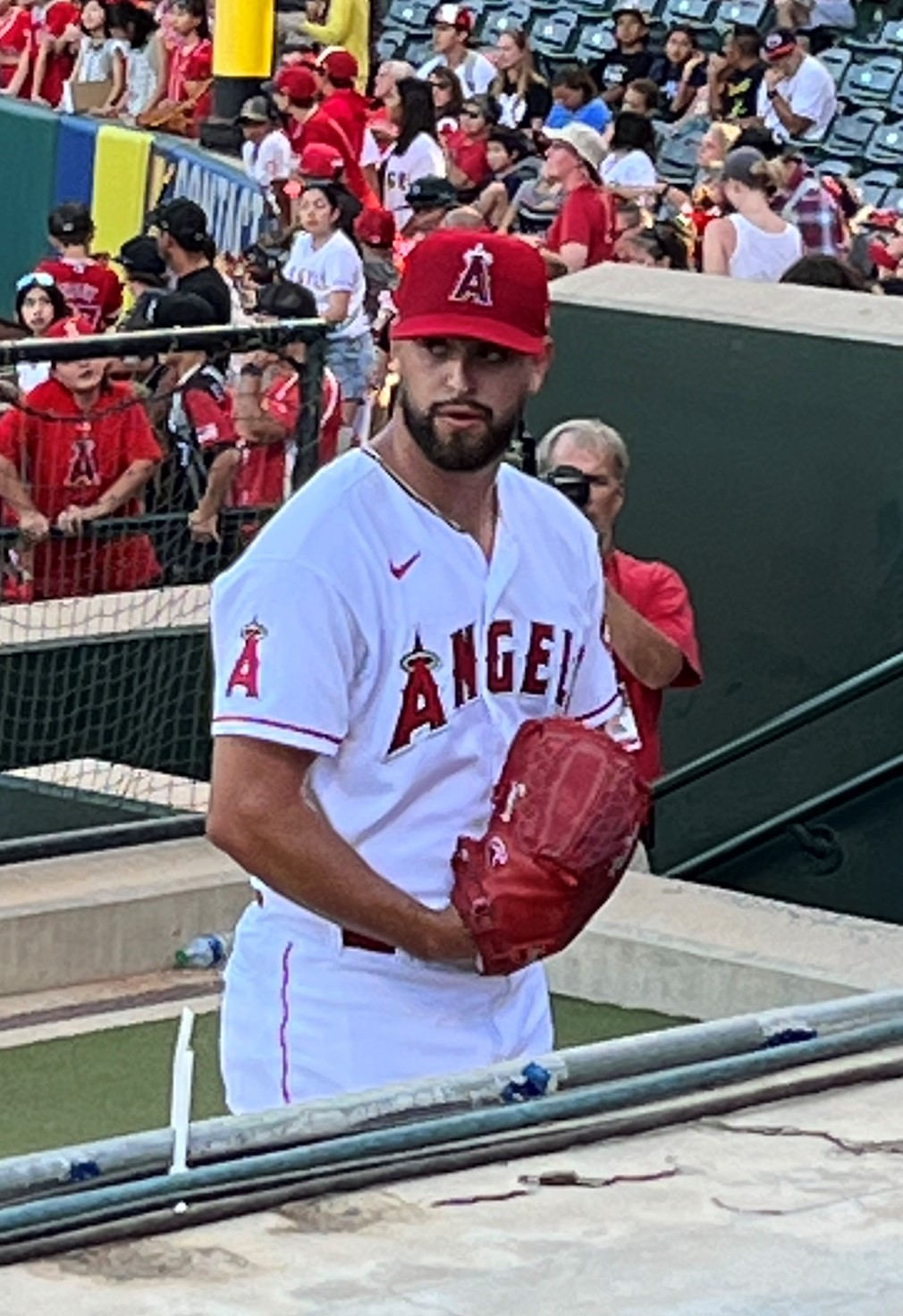
Sandoval warming up before a game in August 2022.

On August 5, 2019, the Angels selected Sandoval's contract and promoted him to the major leagues. He made his major league debut that night versus the Cincinnati Reds, pitching five innings behind opener Taylor Cole while allowing two runs and striking out eight. The first major league batter Sandoval faced was Jesse Winker, who he proceeded to walk. He recorded his first out against Joey Votto and his first strikeout against Eugenio Suárez. The first hit he gave up was a single hit by Tucker Barnhart. Sandoval finished the 2019 season with a 0–4 record and a 5.03 ERA over ten appearances (nine starts), striking out 42 batters in 39 1/3 innings.

In 2020, Sandoval began the COVID-19-shortened season as the fifth member of the team's starting rotation. He made his first start of the year on July 28 against the Seattle Mariners, pitching four innings while giving up an earned run and striking out four. Sandoval struggled in his next four starts, going 0–4 with a 7.71 ERA in 18 2/3 innings. On August 28, Sandoval was optioned to the Angels' alternate training site that was being used in place of the cancelled 2020 minor league season. On September 16, the Angels recalled Sandoval to use him out of the bullpen. In three appearances as a long reliever, he posted a 3.18 ERA with 15 strikeouts through 11 1/3 innings. On September 23, Sandoval was credited with his first career win after throwing three shutout innings against the San Diego Padres at Petco Park. Sandoval received another start on the final day of the season, throwing 2 2/3 innings against the Los Angeles Dodgers while giving up two runs and striking out three. Sandoval finished the 2020 season at 1–5 with a 5.65 ERA, 33 strikeouts, and 36 2/3 innings over nine games (six starts).

Sandoval began the 2021 season as a reliever but was added to the starting rotation in late May when José Quintana was placed on the injured list. On July 24, 2021, in a start against the Minnesota Twins at Target Field, Sandoval carried a no-hit bid into the ninth inning before giving up a double to Brent Rooker with one out. Angels manager Joe Maddon then pulled Sandoval from the game for closer Raisel Iglesias, who allowed Sandoval's baserunner to score before securing the 2–1 win. Sandoval finished the game with 8 2/3 innings pitched, a hit, an earned run, a walk, and 13 strikeouts. On August 27, Sandoval was placed on the 60-day injured list due to a lower back stress fracture, officially ending his season. Angels general manager Perry Minasian praised Sandoval's season, calling it an "outstanding year" and "something to build off of". Over 14 starts prior to the injury, he went 3–6 with a 3.62 ERA with 94 strikeouts in 87 innings. His 2.0 Wins Above Replacement (WAR) was fourth-most among all Angels players and second-most among Angels starting pitchers, only behind American League MVP Shohei Ohtani.

==== 2022–2024: Emergence as a starter ====
Sandoval began the 2022 season as a member of the Angels' starting rotation. He was originally slated to be second in the rotation and make his first start of the year against the Astros on April 8, but he was scratched due to fatigue. He made his season debut on April 12, pitching four innings against the Miami Marlins while not giving up any earned runs but dealing with pitch command issues. Sandoval did not allow an earned run through his first three starts of the season. On August 19, 2022, in a game against the Detroit Tigers at Comerica Park, Sandoval threw the first ever shutout of his career, allowing four hits and no walks with nine strikeouts. He accomplished the feat with 97 pitches, making it the first Maddux for the Angels since Ricky Nolasco did so in 2016 and the first in MLB since Ranger Suárez on September 25, 2021. In 27 starts in 2022, Sandoval went 6–9 with a 2.91 ERA and 151 strikeouts across 148 2/3 innings.

On January 13, 2023, Sandoval signed a one-year, $2.75 million contract with the Angels, avoiding salary arbitration. He was placed second in the Angels rotation behind Ohtani for 2023. He made his first start of the season on April 1, throwing five innings and allowing one run against the Oakland Athletics in a win. After a five-inning, seven-run performance against the Chicago White Sox on June 29, Sandoval's ERA rose to a season-high 4.57. Afterwards, Angels manager Phil Nevin said that Sandoval's emotion was affecting his ability to stay in the game but Sandoval disagreed with the claim. By September 12, Sandoval led the majors with 19 unearned runs allowed; however, his fielding-independent pitching (FIP) average of 4.19 at the end of the season was higher than his ERA. Sandoval unexpectedly left his September 25 start against the Texas Rangers with an oblique injury and was placed on the injured list the next day, causing him to miss his one remaining scheduled start. He finished the season with a 7–13 record, 4.11 ERA, and 128 strikeouts across 144 2/3 innings in 28 games.

On March 19, 2024, Angels manager Ron Washington selected Sandoval as the team's Opening Day starter against the Baltimore Orioles at Camden Yards on March 28. Washington pulled Sandoval from the game after he gave up five runs (three earned) in 1 2/3 innings in a 3–11 loss. In April, Sandoval went 1–4 with a 6.33 ERA in six starts with a total of 27 innings pitched. In his April 26 start, Sandoval decreased his usage of the four-seam fastball in an attempt to improve his results on the mound. Angels pitching coach Barry Enright explained his desire to diversify Sandoval's pitch arsenal but said he was "very encouraged where his stuff is at" and "where his confidence is leading". The Angels announced on June 24, 2024, that Sandoval would require season-ending surgery to his ulnar collateral ligament. He finished the year with a 2–8 record, and a 5.08 ERA in 16 games. On November 22, the Angels non-tendered Sandoval, making him a free agent.

=== Boston Red Sox ===
On December 20, 2024, Sandoval signed with the Boston Red Sox on a two-year, $18.25 million contract. He did not appear for the team during the 2025 season as he continued to recover from surgery. He began the 2026 year on the 60-day injured list. Sandoval made his first appearance for the Red Sox on July 9, 2026, which was his first appearance in the major leagues in over two years. He made the start, pitching 4 1/3 innings, allowed one run on five hits, issued a walk, and struck out five. In 2026, Sandoval appeared in 15 games (13 starts) and had a 1–7 record, a 5.12 ERA, and 73 strikeouts over 70 1/3 innings.

== International career ==
In December 2022, it was announced that Sandoval would pitch for the Mexico national baseball team, managed by Angels first base coach Benji Gil, in the 2023 World Baseball Classic (WBC). He joined fellow Angels pitcher Gerardo Reyes on the Mexico roster. During a game against the United States national baseball team on March 12, Sandoval started and pitched three innings while giving up two hits, a run, and striking out two. He struck out Angels teammate Mike Trout and was credited with the win. Sandoval started for Mexico during a semifinal game against the Japan national baseball team on March 20 and pitched 4 1/3 innings while giving up four hits and no runs, striking out six, and receiving a no decision. Between his two starts, Sandoval posted a 1.23 ERA with eight strikeouts. Following the tournament, he was awarded a bronze medal for Mexico's third-place finish and was one of three pitchers in the tournament named to the All-WBC team.

== Pitching style ==
Sandoval is a 6 ft 3 in, 190 lb (1.90 m, 86 kg) pitcher that utilizes a diverse pitch repertoire. He primarily relies on the four-seam fastball, slider, and changeup while occasionally using the curveball and sinker pitches. Sandoval threw his 93 mile per hour (150 km/h) fastball nearly half the time in his first two major league seasons but decreased its usage in 2021, a change that was accompanied by an improved ERA.

Sandoval's pitches are not frequently hard-hit by batters. In 2021, the average exit velocity on Sandoval's pitches was 85.4 miles per hour (137.4 km/h), placing him in the 97th percentile among all MLB pitchers.

Sandoval occasionally struggles with pitch command, thus allowing walks and preventing him from pitching deep into games without exceeding a typical pitch count limit.
