= List of Los Angeles Angels managers =

There have been 23 managers in the history of the Los Angeles Angels Major League Baseball franchise. The Angels are based in Anaheim, California. They are members of the American League West division of the American League (AL) in Major League Baseball (MLB). The Angels franchise was formed in 1961 as a member of the American League. The team was formerly called the California Angels, the Anaheim Angels, and the Los Angeles Angels of Anaheim, before settling with the Los Angeles Angels.

Bill Rigney became the first manager of the then Los Angeles Angels in 1961, serving for just over eight seasons before being fired by Angels owner Gene Autry during the 1969 season. In terms of tenure, Mike Scioscia has managed more games and seasons than any other coach in franchise history. He managed the Angels to six playoff berths (2002, 2004, 2005, 2007, 2008, and 2009) led the team to a World Series championship in 2002, and won the Manager of the Year award in 2002 and 2009. With the Angels' 2009 Playoff appearance, Mike Scioscia became the first Major League Baseball manager "to guide his team to playoffs six times in [his] first 10 seasons." None of Scioscia's predecessors made it to the World Series. Dick Williams and Whitey Herzog, who served as an interim manager immediately before Williams, are the only Angels managers to have been inducted into the Baseball Hall of Fame.

There have been 16 interim managers in Angels history. In 1969, manager Bill Rigney was fired and replaced by Lefty Phillips. In 1974, manager Whitey Herzog replaced Bobby Winkles. After four games with Herzog at the helm, Dick Williams took over the managerial job and was then replaced with Norm Sherry. A year later, Sherry was replaced by Dave Garcia. Garcia didn't last a full season either, as Jim Fregosi took over as manager in 1978. In 1981, Fregosi was replaced in the mid-season by Gene Mauch. In 1988, manager Cookie Rojas was replaced eight games before the end of the season. After a start of 61 wins and 63 losses in 1991, manager Doug Rader was fired and was replaced by Buck Rodgers. A season later, Rodgers was replaced by Marcel Lachemann, who took the position for four games. He was then succeeded by John Wathan. Rodgers returned as manager in 1993, but he was soon replaced by Lachemann. In 1996, Lachemann was replaced by John McNamara, who in turn was replaced by Joe Maddon. In 1999, Terry Collins resigned as manager in mid-season. Joe Maddon finished the season. Mauch, Rodgers, Lachemann, McNamara, and Maddon have had two stints as manager.

On June 7, 2022, the Angels announced via Twitter that manager Joe Maddon was relieved of his duties as manager. Maddon was signed to a 3-year deal with the team in October 2019 and replaced Brad Ausmus, who was fired after only one season with the team.

== Key ==
#	Number of managers^{[A]}
G	Regular-season games managed
W	Regular-season wins
L	Regular-season losses
Win%	Winning percentage
PA	Playoff appearances
PW	Playoff wins
PL	Playoff losses
*	Elected to the Baseball Hall of Fame

Statistics are accurate as of the end of the 2024 MLB season.

== Managers ==
#^{[a]}	Image	Manager	Seasons	G	W	L	Win%	PA	PW	PL	LC	WS	Achievements	Ref
1		Bill Rigney	1961–1969	1,332	625	707	.469	–	–	–				
2		Lefty Phillips	1969–1971	447	222	225	.496	–	–	–				
3		Del Rice	1972	155	75	80	.483	–	–	–				
4		Bobby Winkles	1973–1974	236	109	127	.461	–	–	–				
5		Whitey Herzog*	1974	4	2	2	.500	–	–	–				
6		Dick Williams*	1974–1976	341	147	194	.431	–	–	–				
7		Norm Sherry	1976–1977	147	76	71	.517	–	–	–				
8		Dave Garcia	1977–1978	126	60	66	.476	–	–	–				
9		Jim Fregosi	1978–1981	486	237	249	.487	4	1	3				
10		Gene Mauch	1981–1982	225	122	103	.542	5	2	3				
11		John McNamara	1983–1984	324	151	173	.466	–	–	–				
–		Gene Mauch	1985–1987	486	257	229	.528	7	3	4				
12		Cookie Rojas	1988	154	75	79	.487	–	–	–				
13		Moose Stubing	1988	8	0	8	.000	–	–	–				
14		Doug Rader	1989–1991	448	232	216	.517	–	–	–				
15		Buck Rodgers	1991–1992	111	53	58	.477	–	–	–				
16		Marcel Lachemann	1992	4	3	1	.750	–	–	–				
17		John Wathan	1992	85	36	49	.423	–	–	–				
–		Buck Rodgers	1993–1994	201	87	114	.432	–	–	–				
–		Marcel Lachemann	1994–1996	331	161	170	.486							
–		John McNamara	1996	18	10	8	.555	–	–	–				
18		Joe Maddon	1996	22	8	14	.363	–	–	–				
19		Terry Collins	1997–1999	457	220	237	.481	–	–	–				
–		Joe Maddon	1999	29	19	10	.655	–	–	–				
20		Mike Scioscia	2000–2018	3,078	1,650	1,428	.536	48	21	27	1	1	2002, 2009 Manager of the Year Award	
21		Brad Ausmus	2019	162	72	90	.444	—	—	—	—	—		
–		Joe Maddon	2020–2022	278	130	148	.468	—	—	—	—	—	—	
22		Phil Nevin	2022–2023	268	119	149	.444	—	—	—	—	—	—	-
23		Ron Washington	2024–2025	242	103	139	.421	—	—	—	—	—	—	-
24		Kurt Suzuki	2026	162	62	100	.383	—	—	—	—	—	—	-

== Managers with multiple tenures ==
#	Manager	Seasons	W	L	Win%	PA	PW	PL	Pct.	Ref
10	Gene Mauch	1981–1982, 1985–1987	379	332	.533	2	5	7	.417	
11	John McNamara	1983–1984, 1996	161	191	.457	–	–	–	–	
15	Buck Rodgers	1991–1992, 1993–1994	140	173	.447	–	–	–	–	
16	Marcel Lachemann	1992, 1994–1996	161	170	.486	–	–	–	–	
18	Joe Maddon	1996, 1999, 2020–2022	157	172	.477	–	–	–	–	

== Notes ==
- ^{A} A running total of the number of managers of the Angels. Thus, any manager who has two or more separate terms is only counted once.
