= Ryan Miller (baseball) =

American baseball player (born 1996)

Free agent
- Pitcher
- Born: March 28, 1996 (age 30); Sarasota, Florida, U.S.
- Bats: Right Throws: Right

MLB debut
- August 27, 2024, for the Los Angeles Angels

MLB statistics (through 2024 season)
- Win–loss record: 0–1
- Earned run average: 4.15
- Strikeouts: 11
- Stats at Baseball Reference

Teams
- Los Angeles Angels (2024)

Ryan Robert Miller (born March 28, 1996) is an American professional baseball pitcher who is a free agent. He has previously played in Major League Baseball (MLB) for the Los Angeles Angels. He made his MLB debut in 2024.

== Career ==
Miller graduated from Venice High School in Venice, Florida, and played college baseball at State College of Florida and Clemson University.

=== Arizona Diamondbacks ===
The Arizona Diamondbacks drafted Miller in the sixth round, with the 189th overall selection, of the 2018 Major League Baseball draft. He made his professional debut with the rookie–level Hillsboro Hops, logging a 3.86 ERA in 12 games. Miller spent the 2019 campaign with the Single–A Kane County Cougars, logging a 4–6 record and 3.62 ERA with 36 strikeouts over 27 appearances out of the bullpen.

Miller did not play in a game in 2020 due to the cancellation of the minor league season because of the COVID-19 pandemic. He was released by the Diamondbacks organization on May 28, 2020.

=== Southern Illinois Miners ===
On January 19, 2021, Miller signed with the Southern Illinois Miners of the Frontier League. In 25 appearances for Southern Illinois, he compiled a 2.89 ERA with 38 strikeouts and 6 saves across 38 innings pitched. Miller became a free agent on October 6, when the Miners folded.

=== Sioux Falls Canaries ===
On February 17, 2022, Miller signed with the Sioux Falls Canaries of the American Association of Professional Baseball. Miller made one appearance for the Canaries, tossing 1 1/3 scoreless innings of relief and recording three strikeouts and the save.

=== New York Yankees ===
On May 19, 2022, Miller's contract was purchased by the New York Yankees organization. In 25 appearances for the High–A Hudson Valley Renegades, Miller posted a 2–3 record and 5.75 ERA with 50 strikeouts across 36 innings.

=== Boston Red Sox ===
On December 7, 2022, Miller was selected by the Boston Red Sox in the minor league phase of the Rule 5 draft. Miller made 41 appearances for the Double–A Portland Sea Dogs, working to a 5–3 record and 4.03 ERA with 67 strikeouts across 60 1/3 innings pitched.

=== Los Angeles Angels ===
On December 6, 2023, the Los Angeles Angels selected Ryan Miller in the minor league phase of the Rule 5 draft. He made 34 appearances for the Triple–A Salt Lake Bees in 2024, posting a 5–1 record and 2.45 ERA with 61 strikeouts over 62 1/3 innings of work. On August 27, 2024, Miller was selected to the 40-man roster and promoted to the major leagues for the first time. He made his MLB debut that day against the Detroit Tigers, tossing a scoreless inning of relief. He became the fifth Sioux Falls Canaries alumnus to debut in MLB; ironically, the only player of those 5 still active at the time (that being John Brebbia) was designated for assignment the same day. In 13 games during his rookie campaign, Miller logged a 4.15 ERA with 11 strikeouts over 13 innings pitched. He was designated for assignment on November 7, to create room on the 40-man roster for Kyle Hendricks. Miller was released by the team on November 12.

=== Detroit Tigers ===
On December 12, 2024, Miller signed a minor league contract with the Detroit Tigers. He made 37 appearances for the Triple-A Toledo Mud Hens, posting a 2–1 record and 4.32 ERA with 44 strikeouts and two saves across 50 innings pitched. On August 4, 2025, Miller was released by the Tigers organization.

=== Colorado Rockies ===
On January 9, 2026, Miller signed a minor league contract with the Colorado Rockies. In 47 games (7 starts) with Triple-A Albuquerque Isotopes he threw 62 innings going 2-4 with a 7.84 ERA with 48 strikeouts and one save. He elected free agency on November 2.
