= Davis Daniel (baseball) =

American baseball player (born 1997)

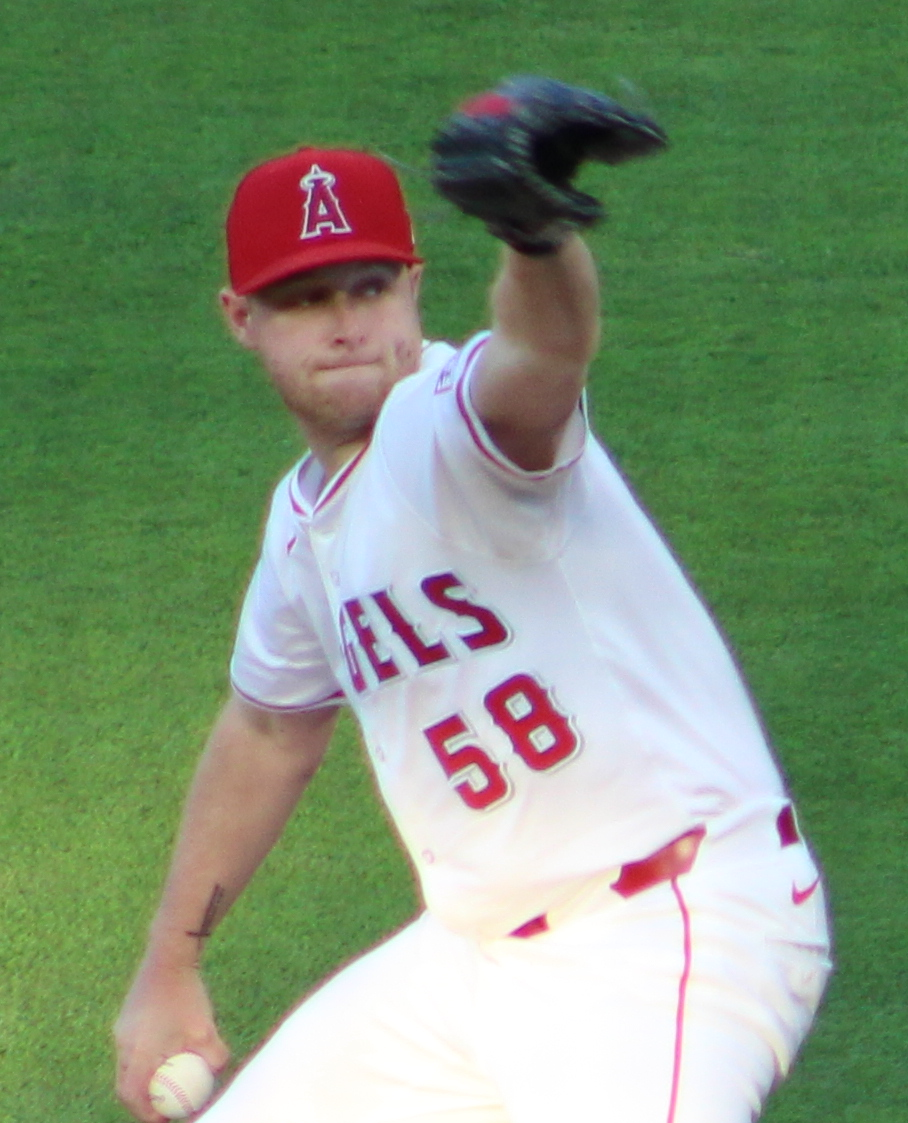
- Daniel with the Los Angeles Angels in 2024

KT Wiz – No. 36
- Pitcher
- Born: June 11, 1997 (age 29); Atlanta, Georgia, U.S.
- Bats: Right Throws: Right

Professional debut
- MLB: September 7, 2023, for the Los Angeles Angels
- KBO: August 13, 2026, for the KT Wiz

MLB statistics (through 2025 season)
- Win–loss record: 2–6
- Earned run average: 5.13
- Strikeouts: 46

KBO statistics (through August 26, 2026)
- Win–loss record: 0–1
- Earned run average: 2.81
- Strikeouts: 15
- Stats at Baseball Reference

Teams
- Los Angeles Angels (2023–2024); Atlanta Braves (2025); KT Wiz (2026–present)

Robert Davis Daniel (born June 11, 1997) is an American professional baseball pitcher for the KT Wiz of the KBO League. He has previously played in Major League Baseball (MLB) for the Los Angeles Angels and Atlanta Braves. He played college baseball at Auburn University and was selected by the Angels in the seventh round of the 2019 MLB draft.

== Amateur career ==
Daniel attended Saint James School in Montgomery, Alabama. He committed to play college baseball at North Carolina State University as a sophomore, but later switched his commitment to Auburn University. In 2016, as a senior, he went 11–1 with a 0.70 ERA and 137 strikeouts over seventy innings. He was selected by the Chicago Cubs in the 34th round of the 2016 Major League Baseball draft, but did not sign and enrolled at Auburn.

In 2017, Daniel's freshman year at Auburn, he appeared in 17 games (making 16 starts) in which he went 4–3 with a 5.89 ERA over 70 1/3 innings. The next season, he pitched 66 2/3 innings, striking out seventy batters and pitching to a 4.86 ERA. Following the season's end, he was selected by the Milwaukee Brewers in the 11th round of the 2018 Major League Baseball draft but did not sign. In 2017, he played collegiate summer baseball with the Brewster Whitecaps of the Cape Cod Baseball League, and returned to the league in 2018 with the Chatham Anglers. As a junior in 2019, Daniel was Auburn's Opening Night starter and pitched two innings before being removed with an arm injury that eventually required Tommy John surgery and forced him to miss the remainder of the season.

== Professional career ==
=== Los Angeles Angels ===
The Los Angeles Angels drafted Daniel in the seventh round, with the 211th overall selection, of the 2019 Major League Baseball draft, and he signed with the team. He did not play in 2019 after signing, and did not play a game in 2020 due to cancellation of the minor league season because of the COVID-19 pandemic. He made his professional debut in 2021 with the Tri-City Dust Devils of the High-A West and was promoted to the Rocket City Trash Pandas of the Double-A South in late June. In early September, he was promoted to the Salt Lake Bees of the Triple-A West. Over 23 games (22 starts) between the three teams, Daniel went 4–7 with a 3.92 ERA and 154 strikeouts over 114 2/3 innings. He returned to Salt Lake to begin the 2022 season.

On June 11, 2022, the Angels selected Daniel's contract and promoted him to the major leagues. He was optioned back to Salt Lake two days later without making an appearance. He played in the minor leagues with Salt Lake the remainder of the season, going 6–7 with a 4.49 ERA and 83 strikeouts over 102 1/3 innings.

On February 16, 2023, prior to the season, Daniel was placed on the 60-day injured list with a right shoulder strain. He was activated from the injured list on August 31 and subsequently optioned to Salt Lake. On September 7, 2023, the Angels promoted Daniel to the major leagues, and he made his MLB debut that night, throwing three scoreless innings in relief against the Cleveland Guardians.

Daniel was optioned to Salt Lake to begin the 2024 season. On June 27, 2024, Daniel made his first MLB start at Angel Stadium versus the Detroit Tigers, pitching eight scoreless innings in which he gave up four hits, eight strikeouts, and no runs or walks, earning his first MLB win. In six starts for the Angels, he struggled to a 1–4 record and 6.23 ERA with 28 strikeouts across 30 1/3 innings pitched. Daniel also made 21 starts for Salt Lake, going 9-7 with a 5.42 ERA. Daniel was designated for assignment following the acquisition of Chuckie Robinson on December 18.

=== Atlanta Braves ===
On December 20, 2024, Daniel was traded to the Atlanta Braves in exchange for Mitch Farris. Daniel was optioned to the Triple-A Gwinnett Stripers to begin the 2025 season. In three appearances (two starts) for Atlanta, he logged an 0–1 record and 5.40 ERA with nine strikeouts over 10 innings of work. On August 16, Daniel was removed from the 40-man roster and sent outright to Triple-A Gwinnett. He elected free agency following the season on November 6.

=== Cincinnati Reds ===
On January 22, 2026, Daniel signed a minor league contract with the Cincinnati Reds. He made 19 appearances (18 starts) for the Triple–A Louisville Bats, compiling a 5–8 record and 4.71 ERA with 93 strikeouts across 93 2/3 innings pitched. Daniel was released by the Reds organization on July 29.

=== KT Wiz ===
On July 30, 2026, Daniel signed with the KT Wiz of the KBO League.
