= Michael Stefanic =

American baseball player (born 1996)

Free agent
- Infielder
- Born: February 24, 1996 (age 30); Boise, Idaho, U.S.
- Bats: Right Throws: Right

MLB debut
- July 3, 2022, for the Los Angeles Angels

MLB statistics (through 2026 season)
- Batting average: .238
- Home runs: 0
- Runs batted in: 18
- Stats at Baseball Reference

Teams
- Los Angeles Angels (2022–2024); Toronto Blue Jays (2025); Athletics (2026)

Michael James Stefanic (/stɛˈfɑːnɪk/ steh-FAH-nik; born February 24, 1996) is an American professional baseball infielder who is a free agent. He has previously played in MLB for the Los Angeles Angels, Toronto Blue Jays, and Athletics. Stefanic attended Westmont College and signed with the Angels as an undrafted free agent. He made his MLB debut in 2022.

== Amateur career ==
Stefanic attended Timberline High School in Boise, Idaho and played college baseball at Westmont College. During all four of his seasons with Westmont, he was selected to both the Golden State Athletic Conference's All-GSAC team and the GSAC Gold Glove team. In his sophomore, junior, and senior years, he led the team in batting average at .352, .371, and .392 respectively. In his senior season, he received an honorable mention for the National Association of Intercollegiate Athletics's All-American team as a second baseman. He graduated from Westmont in 2018 with a bachelor's degree in economics and business.

== Professional career ==
=== Los Angeles Angels ===
After submitting for the 2018 Major League Baseball draft but going undrafted, Stefanic compiled a résumé and highlight compilation and sent it to 150–200 executives from all 30 MLB teams. Stefanic signed with the Los Angeles Angels as a free agent on July 19, 2018, after being contacted by Angels coach Chris Mosch, who was seeking a replacement for an injured player on the Arizona Complex League Angels team. He spent his first professional season in the Arizona League and with the Orem Owlz, batting .351 over 14 games. Stefanic spent 2019 with the Burlington Bees and Inland Empire 66ers, batting .282 with three home runs and 47 runs batted in (RBI) over 102 games. He did not play in a game in 2020 due to the cancellation of the minor league season because of the COVID-19 pandemic. He started 2021 with the Rocket City Trash Pandas before being promoted to the Salt Lake Bees. Over 125 games between the two teams, he batted .336 with 17 home runs, 63 RBI, and 26 doubles.

On July 2, 2022, Stefanic was promoted to the majors for the first time, joining the Angels during their road series against the Houston Astros. He made his major league debut the next day, batting sixth and playing second base against the Houston Astros at Minute Maid Park. He recorded his first major league hit on July 5, a pinch-hit single in the 9th inning off of Miami Marlins pitcher Tanner Scott at loanDepot Park. He subsequently scored his first major league run on a sacrifice fly from Taylor Ward. Through his first seven games, Stefanic batted .389 with an on-base percentage of .500, causing Angels manager Phil Nevin to promote him to the leadoff spot in the lineup on July 12. On July 28, Stefanic was optioned to Salt Lake. On September 14, he was recalled to the Angels.

Stefanic was optioned to the Triple-A Salt Lake Bees to start the 2023 season. In 25 games for the Angels, he batted .290/.380/.355 with no home runs and six RBI.

Stefanic began the 2024 season after suffering a strained left quadricep in spring training. On April 30, he was transferred to the 60–day injured list. Stefanic was activated from the injured list on May 29, and was subsequently optioned to Triple–A Salt Lake. In 40 games for the Angels, he slashed .218/.301/.255 with eight RBI. On October 24, Stefanic was removed from the 40–man roster and sent outright to Salt Lake. He elected free agency following the season on November 4.

=== Toronto Blue Jays ===
On November 27, 2024, Stefanic signed a minor league contract with the Toronto Blue Jays. Stefanic was assigned to the Triple-A Buffalo Bisons to begin the 2025 season. On May 9, 2025, the Blue Jays selected Stefanic's contract, adding him to their active roster. In nine appearances for Toronto, he went 4-for-22 (.182) with three walks. On June 3, Stefanic was designated for assignment by the Blue Jays. He cleared waivers and was sent outright to Buffalo on June 7. Stefanic elected free agency on November 2.

=== Athletics ===
On December 8, 2025, Stefanic signed a minor league contract with the Athletics. He was assigned to the Triple-A Las Vegas Aviators to begin the regular season, where he hit .250 with two home runs and 17 RBI across 34 games. On May 12, 2026, the Athletics selected Stefanic's contract, adding him to their active roster. He made two appearances for the team, going 2-for-5 (.400). On May 16, Stefanic was designated for assignment by the Athletics following the acquisition of Alika Williams. He cleared waivers and was sent outright to Las Vegas on May 18. However, Stefanic subsequently rejected the assignment and elected free agency. Two days later, Stefanic re-signed with the Athletics organization on a minor league contract. On August 21, he had his contract selected back to the major league roster. On October 29, he was sent outright to Triple-A Las Vegas Aviators. He elected free agency on November 2.
