= José Soriano (baseball) =

Dominican baseball player (born 1998)

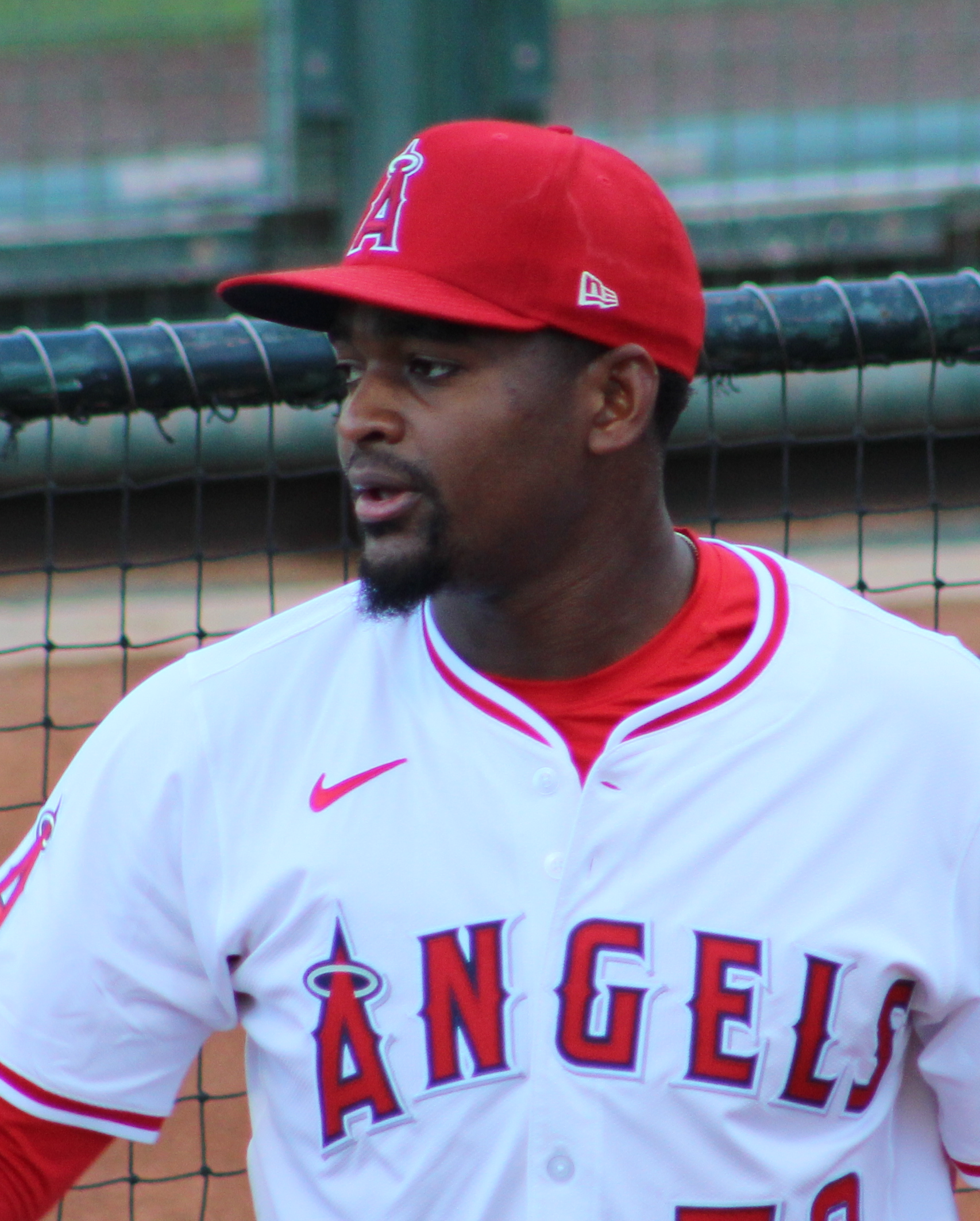
- Soriano with the Los Angeles Angels in 2025

Toronto Blue Jays – No. 40
- Pitcher
- Born: October 20, 1998 (age 27); Santo Domingo, Dominican Republic
- Bats: Right Throws: Right

MLB debut
- June 3, 2023, for the Los Angeles Angels

MLB statistics (through 2026 season)
- Win–loss record: 29–29
- Earned run average: 3.90
- Strikeouts: 474
- Stats at Baseball Reference

Teams
- Los Angeles Angels (2023–2026); Toronto Blue Jays (2026–present)

José Joaquín Soriano (born October 20, 1998) is a Dominican professional baseball pitcher for the Toronto Blue Jays of Major League Baseball (MLB). He has previously played in MLB for the Los Angeles Angels. He made his MLB debut in 2023.

== Career ==
=== Los Angeles Angels ===
Soriano signed with the Los Angeles Angels as an international free agent for a $70,000 signing bonus on March 4, 2016. He made his professional debut with the DSL Angels, logging a 3–5 record and 1.58 ERA in 14 games. The next season, Soriano split the year between the Rookie-level AZL Angels and the Rookie-level Orem Owlz, recording a cumulative 2–2 record and 4.13 ERA in 13 appearances. In 2018, Soriano played for the Single-A Burlington Bees, posting a 1–6 record and 4.47 ERA with 42 strikeouts in 46 1/3 innings pitched. In 2019, Soriano split the year between the AZL Angels and Burlington, accumulating a 5–7 record and 2.51 ERA with 92 strikeouts in 82 innings pitched. On February 13, 2020, Soriano underwent Tommy John surgery, prematurely ending his 2020 season, which was later cancelled due to the COVID-19 pandemic.

=== Pittsburgh Pirates ===
The Pittsburgh Pirates selected Soriano from the Angels in the 2020 Rule 5 draft. On February 17, 2021, Soriano was placed on the 60-day injured list. Soriano pitched to a 14.73 ERA in 2 games for the High-A Bradenton Marauders before suffering an injury. On June 15, Soriano underwent Tommy John surgery for the second time in his career.

=== Los Angeles Angels (second stint) ===
On November 14, 2021, the Pirates returned Soriano to the Angels. In August 2022, Soriano returned to action, beginning a rehab assignment with the rookie-level Arizona Complex League Angels. After he was activated from the injured list, he was assigned to the Single-A Inland Empire 66ers. In 7 appearances between the two affiliates, Soriano registered a 2.08 ERA with 17 strikeouts in 13 innings pitched. On November 15, 2022, the Angels selected his contract to the 40-man roster to protect him from the Rule 5 draft.

Soriano was optioned to the Double-A Rocket City Trash Pandas to start the 2023 season. In 17 appearances, he logged a 4.24 ERA with 31 strikeouts and one save in 23 1/3 innings pitched. On June 3, 2023, the Angels promoted Soriano to the major leagues for the first time. In 38 appearances out of the bullpen during his rookie campaign, he compiled a 3.64 ERA with 56 strikeouts over 42 innings of work.

Soriano made 22 appearances (20 starts) for the Angels in 2024, compiling a 6–7 record and 3.42 ERA with 97 strikeouts across 113 innings pitched. He was placed on the injured list with right arm fatigue on August 14, 2024, and was transferred to the 60–day injured list on September 7, ending his season.

On June 10, 2025, Soriano recorded a career-high 12 strikeouts in a game against the Athletics; the Angels later won the game on a Nolan Schanuel walk-off hit.

=== Toronto Blue Jays ===
On August 3, 2026, the Angels traded Soriano to the Toronto Blue Jays in exchange for Arjun Nimmala, Eddie Micheletti, and Angel Rivero.

== See also ==
- Rule 5 draft results

Awards
Preceded by Max Fried	American League Pitcher of the Month; April 2026	Succeeded by Spencer Arrighetti
