= Guillo Zuñiga =

Colombian baseball player (born 1998)

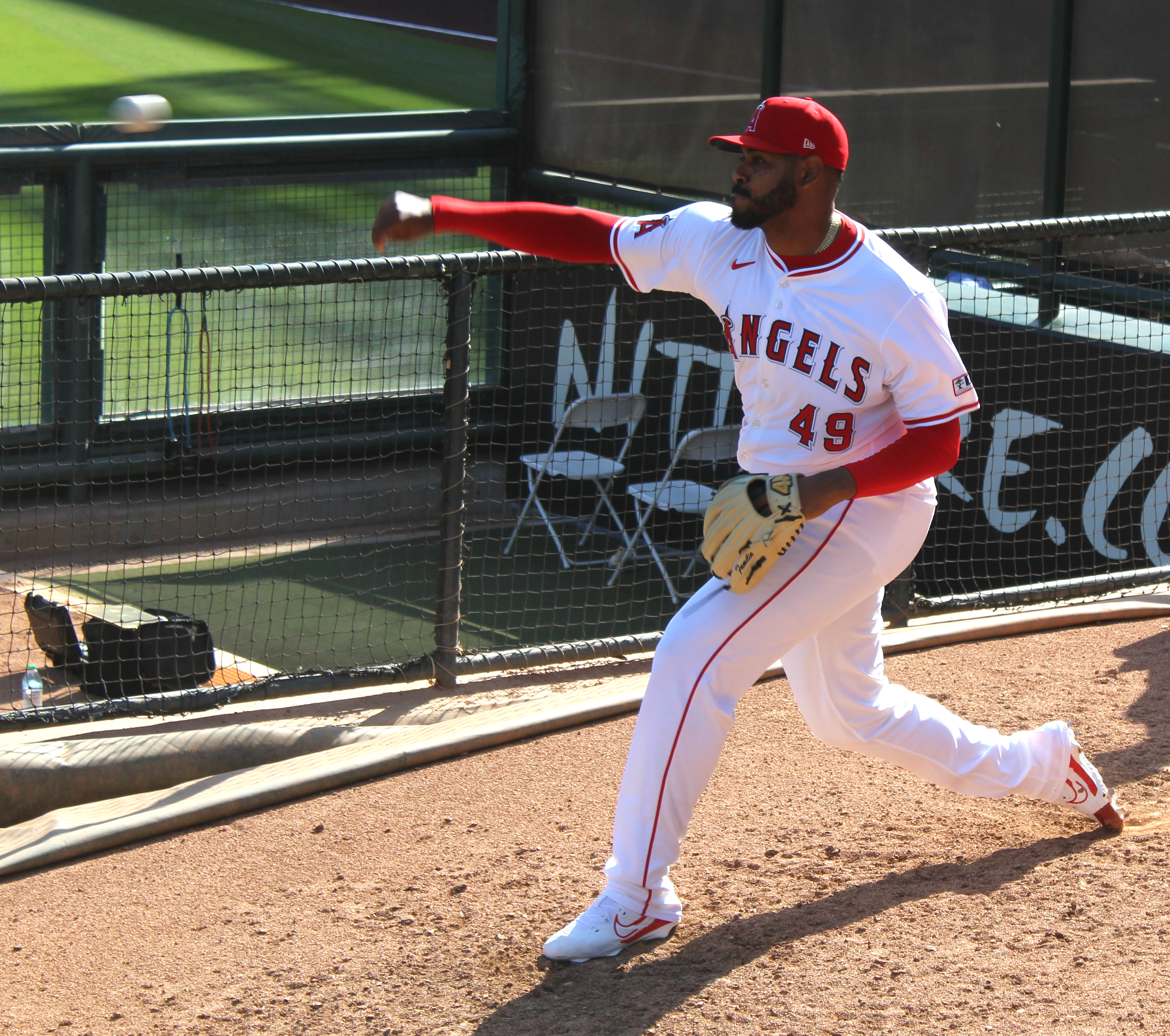
- Zuniga with the Angels in 2024

Free agent
- Pitcher
- Born: October 10, 1998 (age 28); Cartagena, Colombia
- Bats: Right Throws: Right

MLB debut
- May 2, 2023, for the St. Louis Cardinals

MLB statistics (through 2026 season)
- Win–loss record: 0–0
- Earned run average: 4.79
- Strikeouts: 17
- Stats at Baseball Reference

Teams
- St. Louis Cardinals (2023); Los Angeles Angels (2024); New York Mets (2026)

Guillermo Enrique Zuñiga (zoon-YEE-gah; born October 10, 1998) is a Colombian professional baseball pitcher who is a free agent. He has previously played in Major League Baseball (MLB) for the St. Louis Cardinals, Los Angeles Angels, and New York Mets.

== Professional career ==
=== Atlanta Braves ===
Zuñiga signed with the Atlanta Braves as an international free agent on July 2, 2016. He made his professional debut with the Dominican Summer League Braves, posting a 2.61 ERA in five games. In 2017, Zuñiga pitched in eight games (starting six) for the rookie-level Gulf Coast Braves, registering an 0–3 record and 5.59 ERA with 12 strikeouts in 19.1 innings of work.

On October 2, 2017, Braves general manager John Coppolella and international scouting director Gordon Blakely resigned after an MLB investigation into their activities discovered several rules violations regarding international signings. On November 21, MLB ordered that Zuñiga and several other players were released from their contracts and declared to be free agents.

=== Los Angeles Dodgers ===
On December 6, 2017, Zuñiga signed a minor league contract with the Los Angeles Dodgers organization. He spent the 2018 season with the rookie-level Arizona League Dodgers, logging a 3–1 record and 3.86 ERA with 41 strikeouts across 12 games (two starts). In 2019, Zuñiga split time between the Single-A Great Lakes Loons and High-A Rancho Cucamonga Quakes, pitching in 33 games and posting a cumulative 4–3 record and 4.08 ERA with 81 strikeouts and 5 saves in 68.1 innings of work. He did not play in a game in 2020 due to the cancellation of the minor league season because of the COVID-19 pandemic.

In 2021, Zuñiga made 25 appearances for the Double-A Tulsa Drillers, pitching to a 7–2 record and 3.06 ERA with 49 strikeouts and two saves in 35.1 innings of work. He returned to Tulsa the following year, pitching in 48 games and registering a 4–4 record and 4.77 ERA with 66 strikeouts and 11 saves in 54.2 innings pitched. He elected free agency following the season on November 10, 2022.

=== St. Louis Cardinals ===
On December 6, 2022, Zuñiga signed a major league contract with the St. Louis Cardinals. The Cardinals optioned Zuñiga to the Triple-A Memphis Redbirds to begin the 2023 season. He made 9 appearances for Memphis, registering a 5.40 ERA with nine strikeouts and three saves in 8 1/3 innings pitched. On May 2, 2023, Zuñiga was promoted to the major leagues for the first time. On May 2, Zuñiga debuted against the Los Angeles Angels, retiring Chad Wallach, Zach Neto, and Mike Trout in order. Additionally, Wallach and Trout served as his first career strikeouts. On August 27, Zuńiga was placed on the injured list with a right forearm strain. He was transferred to the 60–day injured list on September 2, ending his season. In only two appearances for St. Louis, he recorded a 4.50 ERA with four strikeouts in two innings of work. Zuñiga was designated for assignment on February 3, 2024.

=== Los Angeles Angels ===
On February 7, 2024, the Los Angeles Angels acquired Zuñiga from the Cardinals in exchange for cash considerations. In 15 games for Los Angeles, he compiled a 5.09 ERA with 12 strikeouts and 2 saves across 17 2/3 innings pitched. Zuñiga was designated for assignment by the Angels on November 12, in order to clear roster space for Travis d'Arnaud. He was released by the Angels organization on November 15.

=== Philadelphia Phillies ===
On December 13, 2024, Zuñiga signed a minor league contract with Philadelphia Phillies. He made 38 appearances for the Triple-A Lehigh Valley IronPigs, compiling a 3-1 record and 5.14 ERA with 43 strikeouts and three saves over 42 innings of work. On August 31, 2025, Zuñiga was released by the Phillies organization.

=== Seattle Mariners ===
On September 2, 2025, Zuñiga signed a minor league contract with the Seattle Mariners organization. He made four appearances for the Triple-A Tacoma Rainiers, posting a 1-0 record and 6.23 ERA with three strikeouts across 4 1/3 innings pitched. Zuñiga was released by Seattle prior to the start of the regular season on March 20, 2026.

=== New York Mets ===
On May 5, 2026, Zuñiga signed a minor league contract with the New York Mets organization. He made 14 appearances split between the Double-A Binghamton Rumble Ponies and Triple-A Syracuse Mets, accumulating an 0-1 record and 3.29 ERA with 18 strikeouts and one save across 13 2/3 innings pitched. On July 5, the Mets selected Zuñiga's contract, adding him to their active roster. The next day, he tossed a scoreless inning of relief against the Atlanta Braves. Zuñiga was designated for assignment by the Mets following the promotion of Matt Seelinger on July 7. He cleared waivers and was sent outright to Syracuse on July 9. He elected free agency on November 2.

== International career ==
Zuñiga played for the Colombian national baseball team in the 2023 World Baseball Classic. Over two appearances and three innings pitched, he did not allow a run and led the team in strikeouts, with six. Zuñiga also earned the win over Mexico, allowing a double to Austin Barnes but striking out Jonathan Aranda and Alex Verdugo.
