= Arjun Nimmala =

American baseball player (born 2005)

Los Angeles Angels
- Shortstop
- Born: October 16, 2005 (age 20); Tampa, Florida, U.S.
- Bats: Right Throws: Right
- Stats at Baseball Reference

Arjun Nimmala (born October 16, 2005) is an American professional baseball shortstop in the Los Angeles Angels organization.

== Early life ==
Nimmala's parents immigrated to the United States from India. As a youth, Nimmala primarily played cricket and spent his summers visiting his relatives in Vijayawada, Andhra Pradesh. His family spoke Telugu at home. He lives in Valrico, Florida.

== Amateur career ==
Nimmala attended Strawberry Crest High School. He committed to play college baseball at Florida State University while he was a freshman in high school.

Nimmala was named the Florida Gatorade player of the Year and the Wade Boggs Athletic Award, given to the best player in Hillsborough County, Florida, as a senior after batting .479 with six home runs and 29 runs batted in (RBIs).

== Professional career ==
=== Toronto Blue Jays ===
The Toronto Blue Jays selected Nimmala in the first round, with the 20th overall selection, in the 2023 Major League Baseball draft. He signed with the Blue Jays on July 17, 2023, for a below slot value of $3,000,000. Nimmala appeared in nine games for the Rookie-level Florida Complex League Blue Jays, batting .200 with three RBIs, and 14 walks against eight strikeouts. In 2024, Nimmala played primarily for the Low-A Dunedin Blue Jays, appearing in 90 total games and batting .232 with 17 home runs, 47 RBI, and nine stolen bases. Nimmala played the entire 2025 season with the High-A Vancouver Canadians. In 120 games, he hit .224 with 13 home runs, 61 RBI, and 17 stolen bases. At 19 years of age, Nimmala was one of the youngest players in High-A in 2025, and played against competitors who were, on average, 3.3 years older than him.

=== Los Angeles Angels ===
On August 3, 2026, the Blue Jays traded Nimmala, along with Eddie Micheletti and Angel Rivero to the Los Angeles Angels in exchange for José Soriano.
