= Hans Crouse =

American baseball player (born 1998)

Free agent
- Pitcher
- Born: September 15, 1998 (age 28); Dana Point, California, U.S.
- Bats: Left Throws: Right

MLB debut
- September 26, 2021, for the Philadelphia Phillies

MLB statistics (through 2024 season)
- Win–loss record: 4–5
- Earned run average: 3.34
- Strikeouts: 36
- Stats at Baseball Reference

Teams
- Philadelphia Phillies (2021); Los Angeles Angels (2024)

Hans Michael Crouse (born September 15, 1998) is an American professional baseball pitcher who is a free agent. He has previously played in Major League Baseball (MLB) for the Philadelphia Phillies and Los Angeles Angels.

== Amateur career ==
Crouse attended Dana Hills High School in Dana Point, California. As a senior, he struck out 99 batters in 63 1/2 innings, posting a 7–3 win–loss record with a 0.88 earned run average (ERA). He helped lead Dana Hills to the finals of the National High School Invitational and was named the Orange County Register's high school pitcher of the year. He committed to the University of Southern California to play college baseball. Crouse was considered one of the top prep prospects for the 2017 MLB draft.

== Professional career ==
=== Texas Rangers ===
Crouse was selected in the second round, 66th overall, by the Texas Rangers. He signed with the Rangers for a $1.45 million bonus and was then assigned to the AZL Rangers of the Rookie-level Arizona League, where he spent all of his first professional season, posting a 0.45 ERA with thirty strikeouts in twenty innings pitched along with an 0.70 WHIP. In 2018, he split time between the Spokane Indians of the Class A Short Season Northwest League and the Hickory Crawdads of the Class A South Atlantic League, compiling a combined 5–3 record and 2.47 ERA in 13 total starts between both teams.

Crouse was ranked as the #73 overall prospect in baseball by Baseball America in their preseason 2019 Top 100 list. Crouse was also ranked as the #85 overall prospect in baseball by MLB Pipeline in their preseason 2019 Top 100 list. Crouse was ranked as the #95 overall prospect in baseball by ESPN's Keith Law in his preseason 2019 Top 100 list.

Crouse was assigned back to Hickory for the 2019 season. Crouse produced a 6–1 record with a 4.41 ERA in 87 2/3 innings in 2019. He was hampered by bone spurs in his right elbow throughout the season, which forced him to miss almost a month of action and required surgery following the season to remove. Crouse did not play in a game in 2020 due to the cancellation of the Minor League Baseball season because of the COVID-19 pandemic. Crouse opened the 2021 season with the Frisco RoughRiders of the Double-A Central, going 3–2 with a 3.35 ERA and 54 strikeouts over 51 innings.

=== Philadelphia Phillies ===
On July 30, 2021, Crouse, Kyle Gibson, and Ian Kennedy were traded to the Philadelphia Phillies in exchange for Spencer Howard, Kevin Gowdy, and Josh Gessner. He split the remainder of the minor league season between the Double–A Reading Fightin Phils and the Triple–A Lehigh Valley IronPigs. On September 26, Crouse's contract was selected to the active roster to make his MLB debut that day versus the Pittsburgh Pirates.

Crouse was optioned to Triple-A Lehigh Valley to begin the 2022 season. He suffered a biceps injury on April 20, and was placed on the 60-day injured list on July 15 with right biceps tendinitis. On November 9, Crouse was removed from the 40-man roster and sent outright to Lehigh Valley.

Crouse split the 2023 season between the Single–A Clearwater Threshers, Reading, and Lehigh Valley. In 18 appearances between the three affiliates, he struggled to a 6.14 ERA with 29 strikeouts across 22.0 innings of work. Crouse elected free agency following the season on November 6, 2023.

=== Los Angeles Angels ===
On February 8, 2024, Crouse signed a minor league contract with the Los Angeles Angels and was assigned to the Triple-A Salt Lake Bees. In 21 appearances for the Bees, he recorded a 2.70 ERA with 42 strikeouts across 23 1/3 innings pitched. On June 21, the Angels selected Crouse's contract, adding him to the active roster. In 25 appearances for the Angels, he compiled a 4–3 record and 2.84 ERA with 34 strikeouts across 25 1/3 innings pitched.

Crouse was optioned to Triple-A Salt Lake to begin the 2025 season. He was released by the Angels on April 6, 2025.

=== Baltimore Orioles ===
On January 20, 2026, Crouse signed a minor league contract with the Baltimore Orioles. He made 31 appearances (including one start) split between the High–A Frederick Keys and Triple–A Norfolk Tides, accumulating a 4–2 record and 4.45 ERA with 39 strikeouts and two saves across 32 1/3 innings pitched. Crouse was released by the Orioles organization on July 27.

=== San Diego Padres ===
On August 2, 2026, Crouse signed a minor league contract with the San Diego Padres. In 14 games with Triple-A El Paso Chihuahuas he threw 14.2 innings of relief going 1-1 with a 9.20 ERA with more walks (18) than strikeouts (16) and one save. He elected free agency on November 2.

== Personal life ==
Crouse has more than 20 tattoos and designed them all himself.
