= Charles Leblanc =

Canadian baseball player (born 1996)

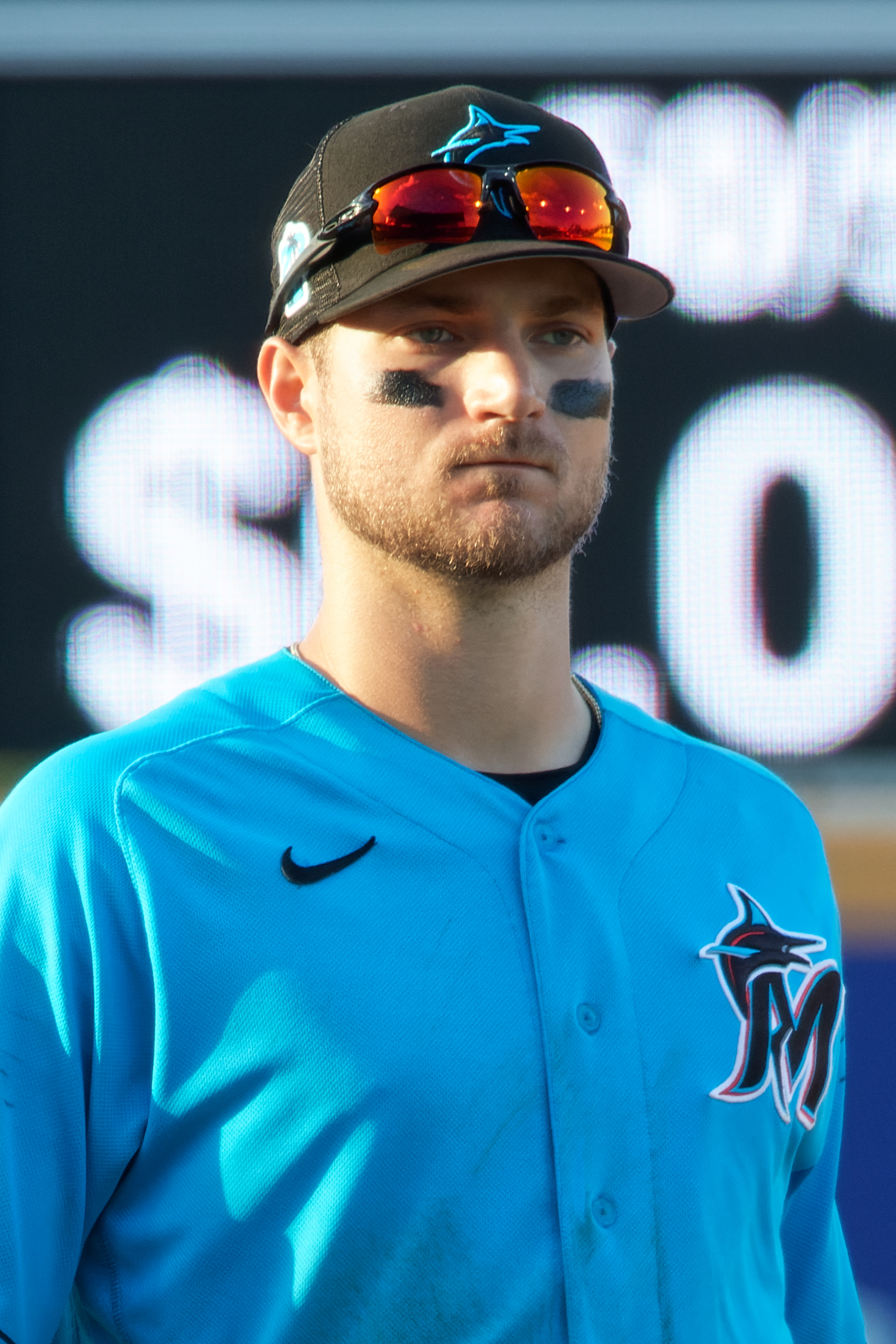
- Leblanc with the Marlins in 2023

Free agent
- Infielder
- Born: June 3, 1996 (age 30); Laval, Quebec, Canada
- Bats: Right Throws: Right

MLB debut
- July 30, 2022, for the Miami Marlins

MLB statistics (through 2024 season)
- Batting average: .256
- Home runs: 5
- Runs batted in: 14
- Stats at Baseball Reference

Teams
- Miami Marlins (2022); Los Angeles Angels (2024)

Charles Leblanc (born June 3, 1996) is a Canadian professional baseball infielder who is a free agent. He has previously played in Major League Baseball (MLB) for the Miami Marlins and Los Angeles Angels.

== Amateur career ==
Leblanc attended Georges Vanier Secondary School in Laval, Québec. He was drafted by the Milwaukee Brewers in the 33rd round of the 2013 MLB draft, but did not sign and instead attended the University of Pittsburgh to play college baseball for the Panthers. He hit .292 with 3 home runs and 30 RBI as a freshman in 2015. In 2016 he hit .405/.494/.513/1.006 with 2 home runs and 46 RBI, and was named First Team All-ACC .

Leblanc played collegiate summer baseball for the Kalamazoo Growlers of the Northwoods League in 2015.

Leblanc was drafted by the Texas Rangers in the 4th round of the 2016 MLB draft and signed with them.

== Professional career ==
=== Texas Rangers ===
He spent his professional debut season of 2016 with the Spokane Indians of the Low–A Northwest League, hitting .285/.380/.386 with 1 home run and 15 RBI. He split the 2017 season between Spokane and the Hickory Crawdads of the Single–A South Atlantic League, hitting a combined .244/.314/.333 with 4 home runs and 21 RBI. Leblanc spent the 2018 season with the Down East Wood Ducks of the High–A Carolina League, hitting .274/.349/.412 with 10 home runs and 72 RBI. After the 2018 season, he played for the Surprise Saguaros of the Arizona Fall League, hitting .292/.382/.354 with 6 RBI. He spent the 2019 season with the Frisco RoughRiders of the Double-A Texas League, hitting .265/.329/.355 with 7 home runs and 54 RBI. He did not play in 2020 due to the cancellation of the Minor League Baseball season because of the COVID-19 pandemic. He spent the 2021 season with the Round Rock Express of the Triple-A West, hitting .229/.313/.455 with 17 home runs and 54 RBI.

=== Miami Marlins ===
On December 8, 2021, Leblanc was selected by the Miami Marlins in the minor league phase of the Rule 5 draft. He opened the 2022 season with the Triple–A Jacksonville Jumbo Shrimp. On July 29, 2022, Miami selected Leblanc's contract and called him up to the major leagues for the first time. On July 30, LeBlanc collected his first career hit, a standup double off of New York Mets starter Carlos Carrasco. The next day, LeBlanc hit his first career home run off of Philadelphia Phillies starter Taijuan Walker.

On January 4, 2023, Leblanc was designated for assignment by the Marlins after the signing of Jean Segura was made official. He cleared waivers and was sent outright to Triple–A Jacksonville on January 11. In 94 games for Triple–A Jacksonville, he batted .253/.384/.423 with 12 home runs and 34 RBI. Leblanc elected free agency following the season on November 6.

=== Los Angeles Angels ===
On November 26, 2023, Leblanc signed a minor league contract with the Los Angeles Angels. In 81 games for the Triple–A Salt Lake Bees, he batted .262/.382/.472 with 12 home runs and 48 RBI. On August 3, 2024, the Angels selected Leblanc's contract, adding him to their active roster. In 11 games for Los Angeles, he slashed .190/.393/.476 with two home runs and six RBI. On October 24, Leblanc was removed from the 40–man roster and sent outright to Salt Lake. He elected free agency on October 28.

=== Atlanta Braves ===
On November 13, 2024, Leblanc signed a minor league contract with the Atlanta Braves. He began the 2025 season with the Triple-A Gwinnett Stripers, batting .291/.394/.316 with eight RBI across 22 appearances. Leblanc was released by the Braves organization on June 6, 2025.

== See also ==
- Rule 5 draft results
