= Griffin Canning =

American baseball player (born 1996)

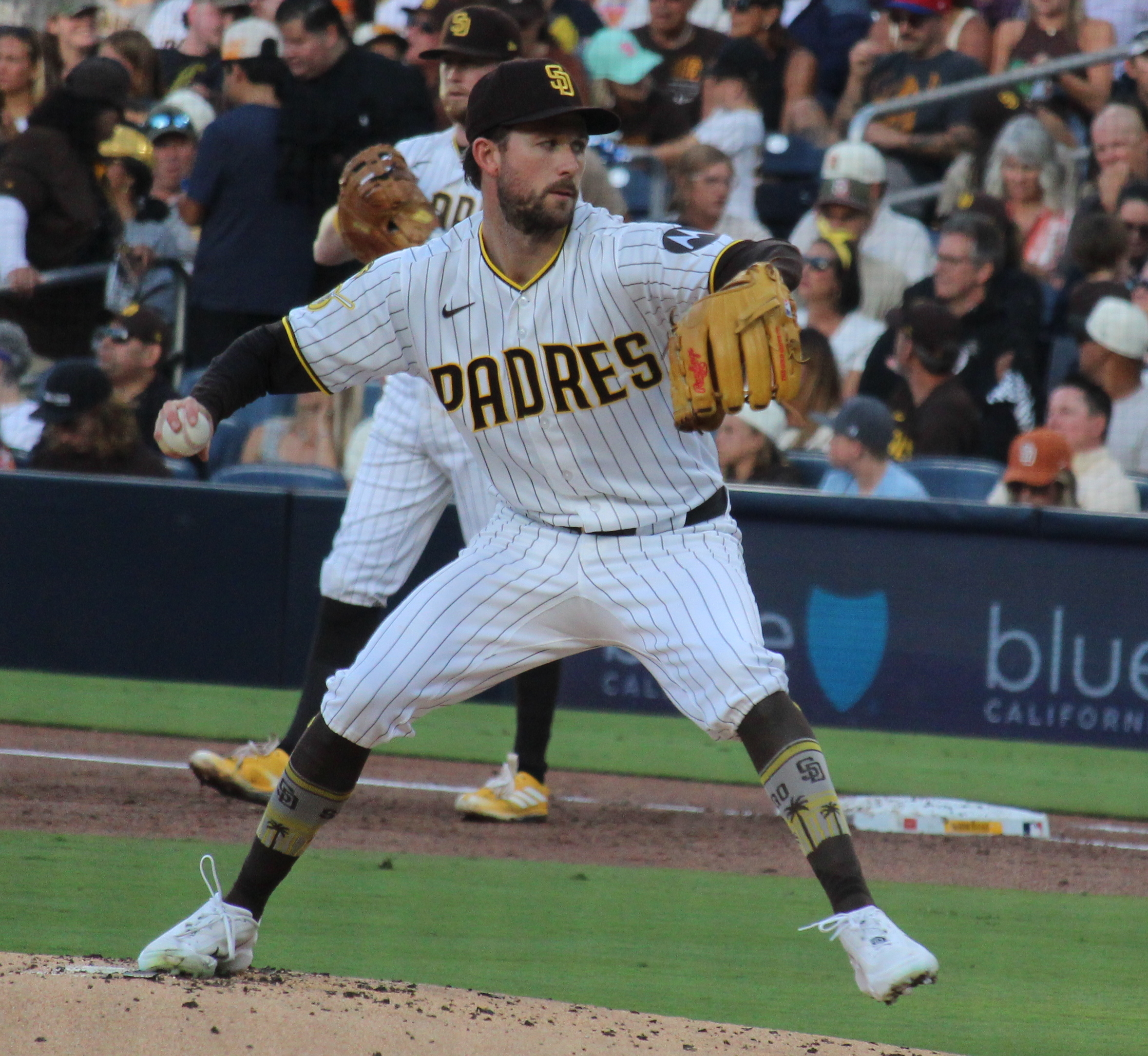
- Canning with the Padres in 2026

Free agent
- Pitcher
- Born: May 11, 1996 (age 30); Mission Viejo, California, U.S.
- Bats: Right Throws: Right

MLB debut
- April 30, 2019, for the Los Angeles Angels

MLB statistics (through 2026 season)
- Win–loss record: 37–46
- Earned run average: 4.79
- Strikeouts: 640
- Stats at Baseball Reference

Teams
- Los Angeles Angels (2019–2021, 2023–2024); New York Mets (2025); San Diego Padres (2026)

Career highlights and awards
- Gold Glove Award (2020)

Griffin Alexander Canning (born May 11, 1996) is an American professional baseball pitcher who is a free agent. He has previously played in MLB for the Los Angeles Angels, New York Mets, and San Diego Padres. He made his MLB debut in 2019 with the Angels and won a Gold Glove Award in 2020.

== Amateur career ==
Canning attended Santa Margarita Catholic High School in Rancho Santa Margarita, California. He played for the school's baseball team as a pitcher. As a senior, he had an 11–3 win–loss record with a 1.51 earned run average (ERA) and 123 strikeouts, and was named the Orange County Register Pitcher of the Year. In his final game, he led Santa Margarita to victory in the 2014 California Interscholastic Federation SS Division I Championship, recording 11 strikeouts and allowing only two hits. Canning was drafted by the Colorado Rockies in the 38th round of the 2015 Major League Baseball draft, but did not sign and played college baseball at University of California, Los Angeles (UCLA) for the Bruins.

Canning made 15 appearances with 11 starts as a freshman at UCLA in 2015. He was 7–1 with a 2.97 ERA and 66 strikeouts. As a sophomore, he became UCLA's number one starter. He made 15 starts, going 5–8 with a 3.70 ERA and 95 strikeouts. Canning returned as UCLA's ace in 2017. In 17 starts, he went 7–4 with a 2.34 ERA and 140 strikeouts.

== Professional career ==
=== Los Angeles Angels ===
==== Minor leagues ====
The Los Angeles Angels selected Canning with the 47th pick in the second round of the 2017 Major League Baseball draft. He signed with the Angels for a $1,459,200 signing bonus, but did not pitch in 2017. He made his professional debut in 2018 with the Inland Empire 66ers of the High–A California League, and after pitching 8 2/3 scoreless innings, he was promoted to the Mobile BayBears of the Double–A Southern League. He was promoted to the Salt Lake Bees of the Triple–A Pacific Coast League in June. In 25 starts between the three teams, Canning went 4–3 with a 3.65 ERA and a 1.26 WHIP.

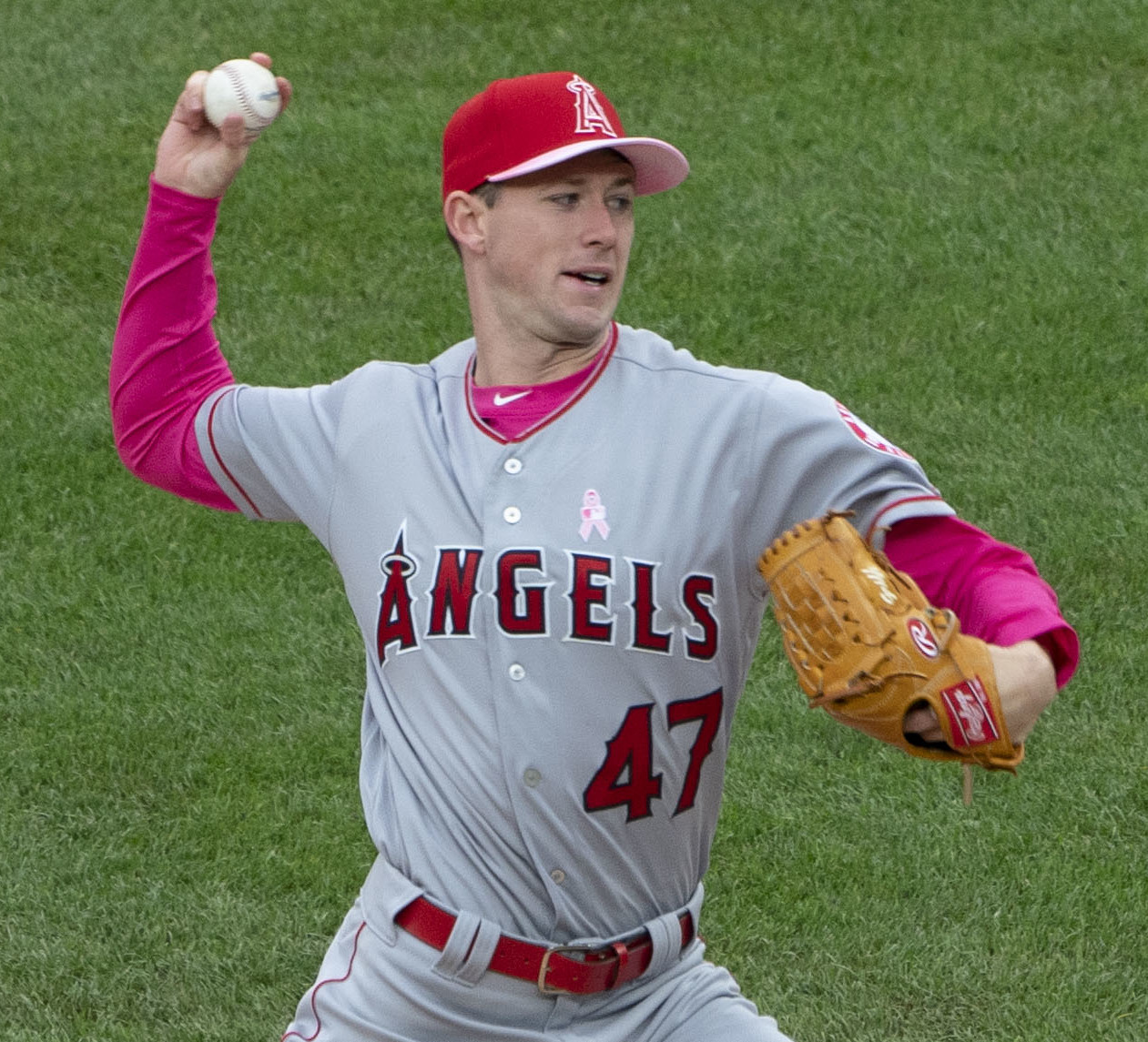
Canning with the Angels in 2019

Canning returned to Salt Lake to begin the 2019 season.

==== Major leagues ====
On April 30, 2019, the Angels promoted Canning to the major leagues and he made his debut that night, against the Toronto Blue Jays, recording six strikeouts over 4 1/3 innings pitched. After multiple trips to the injured list with elbow inflammation, the Angels announced on August 22, that they would shut down Canning for the rest of the season, cutting his rookie season short. He went 5–6 with a 4.58 ERA and 96 strikeouts.

In 2020, Canning went 2–3 with a 3.99 ERA and 56 strikeouts in 11 starts. He was tied for the AL lead among pitchers with three defensive runs saved and made just one error out of 16 chances. Canning went on to win his first Gold Glove Award that season.

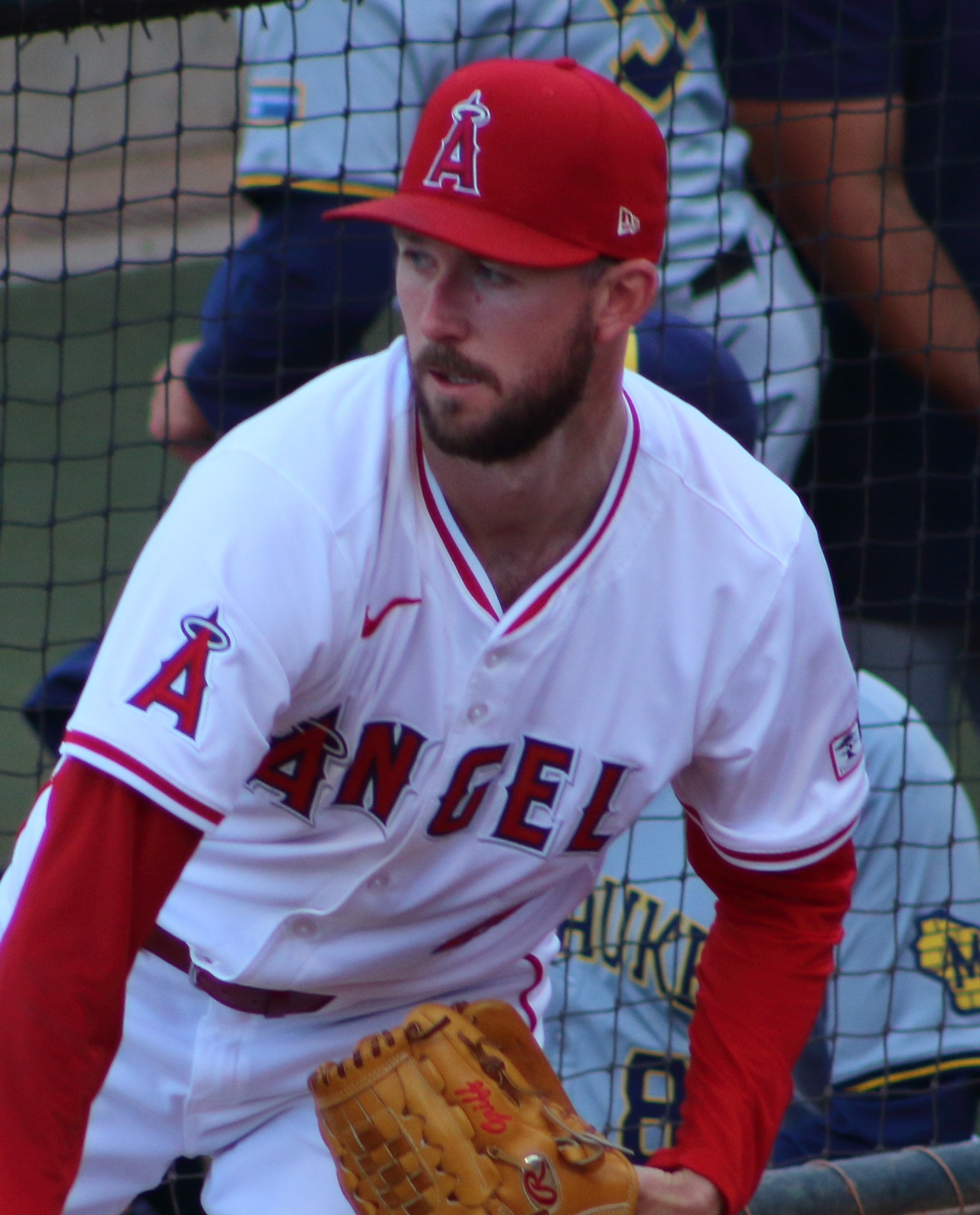
Canning with the Angels in 2024

In 2021, Canning went 5–4 with a 5.60 ERA and 62 strikeouts in 13 starts. On July 3, 2021, Canning was optioned to Triple-A Salt Lake. On August 10, 2021, the Angels announced that Canning would miss the rest of the season with a low back stress fracture.

Canning was placed on the 60-day IL to begin the 2022 season. In August, he was shut down after experiencing multiple setbacks in his recovery, and did not make a professional appearance on the year. On January 13, 2023, Canning signed a one-year, $850,000 contract with the Angels, avoiding salary arbitration.

Canning made 32 appearances (31 starts) for the Angels in 2024, compiling a 6–13 record and 5.19 ERA with 130 strikeouts across 171 2/3 innings pitched.

On October 31, 2024, Canning was traded to the Atlanta Braves in exchange for Jorge Soler. However, on November 22, the Braves non–tendered Canning, making him a free agent.

=== New York Mets ===
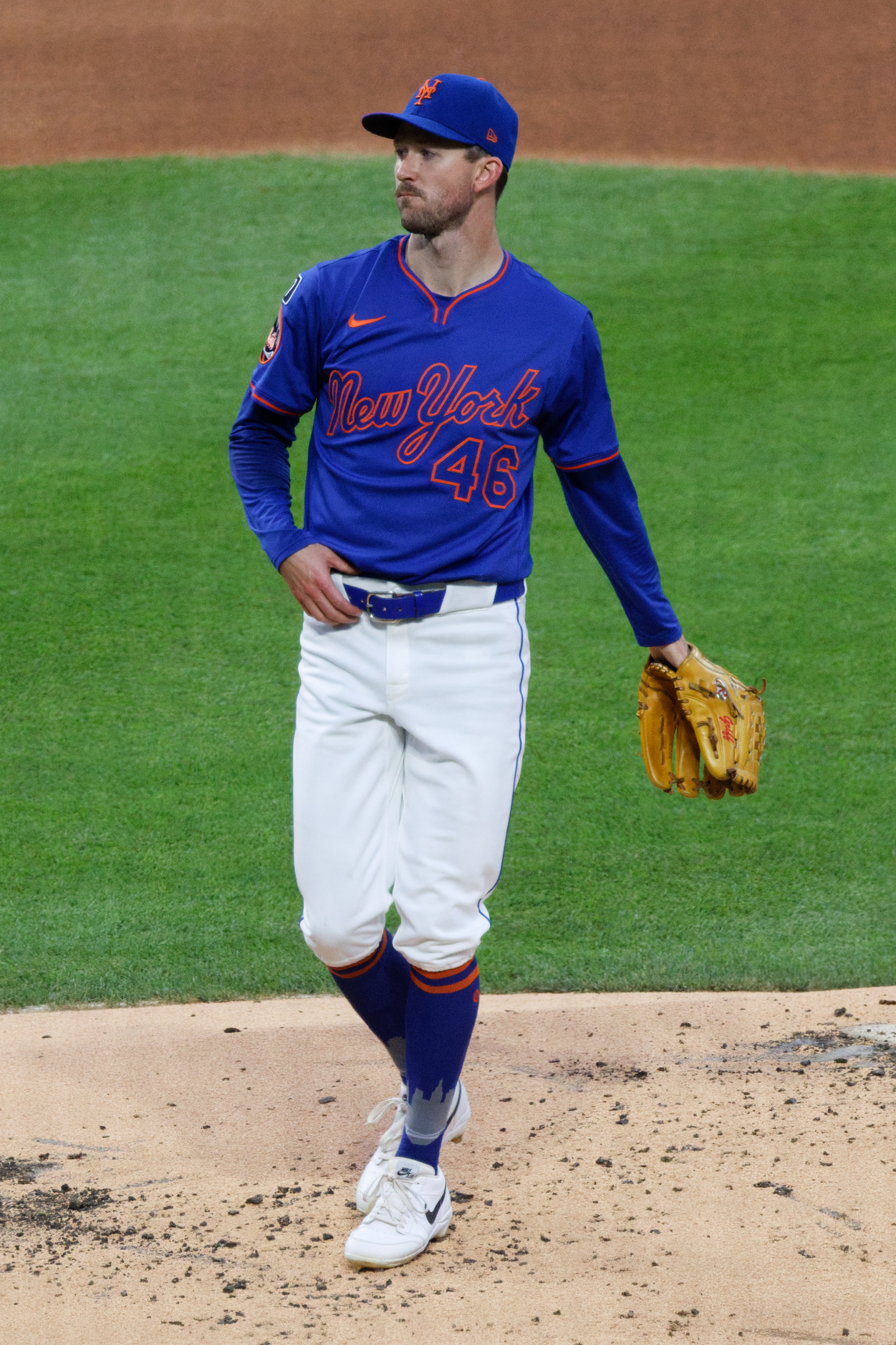
Canning in 2025

On December 19, 2024, Canning signed a one-year, $4.25 million contract with the New York Mets. In 16 starts for the Mets, he posted a 7–3 record and a 3.77 ERA with 70 strikeouts across 76 1/3 innings pitched. In a 4–0 victory over the Atlanta Braves on June 26, 2025, Canning suffered a ruptured Achilles tendon, abruptly ending his season.

=== San Diego Padres ===
On February 17, 2026, Canning signed a one-year, $1 million contract with the San Diego Padres, that also included a mutual option for the 2027 season with a $1.5 million buyout. On November 1, the Padres declined their half of a mutual contract option making him a free agent.
