= 2024 Texas Rangers season =

Major League Baseball season

2024 Texas Rangers
- League: American League
- Division: West
- Ballpark: Globe Life Field
- City: Arlington
- Record: 78–84 (.481)
- Divisional place: 3rd
- Owners: Ray Davis & Bob R. Simpson
- General managers: Chris Young
- Managers: Bruce Bochy
- Television: Bally Sports Southwest; KTXA (4 spring training and 1 regular season game)
- Radio: KRLD 105.3 FM (English); KZMP 1540 AM (Spanish)
- Stats: ESPN.com; Baseball Reference

The 2024 Texas Rangers season was the 64th of the Texas Rangers franchise overall, their 53rd in Arlington as the Rangers, and the fifth season at Globe Life Field. They entered the season as the defending World Series champions, after winning their first World Series title in franchise history, as well as the defending American League champions.

As a result of many injuries throughout the season, the Rangers failed to improve on their 90–72 record from 2023 and on September 20, they were eliminated from postseason contention, making them the first team since the 2020 Washington Nationals and the 12th team in the past 25 years to be eliminated from postseason contention after winning the previous season's World Series. Major League Baseball continued to fail to have a repeat champion since the 2000 New York Yankees until the next season's Los Angeles Dodgers repeated as champions.

== Season standings ==
=== American League West ===
AL West
Team	W	L	Pct.	GB	Home	Road
Houston Astros	88	73	.547	—	46‍–‍35	42‍–‍38
Seattle Mariners	85	77	.525	3½	49‍–‍32	36‍–‍45
Texas Rangers	78	84	.481	10½	44‍–‍37	34‍–‍47
Oakland Athletics	69	93	.426	19½	38‍–‍43	31‍–‍50
Los Angeles Angels	63	99	.389	25½	32‍–‍49	31‍–‍50

=== American League Wild Card ===
Division leaders
Team	W	L	Pct.
New York Yankees	94	68	.580
Cleveland Guardians	92	69	.571
Houston Astros	88	73	.547

Wild Card teams (Top 3 teams qualify for postseason)
Team	W	L	Pct.	GB
Baltimore Orioles	91	71	.562	+5
Kansas City Royals	86	76	.531	—
Detroit Tigers	86	76	.531	—
Seattle Mariners	85	77	.525	1
Minnesota Twins	82	80	.506	4
Boston Red Sox	81	81	.500	5
Tampa Bay Rays	80	82	.494	6
Texas Rangers	78	84	.481	8
Toronto Blue Jays	74	88	.457	12
Oakland Athletics	69	93	.426	17
Los Angeles Angels	63	99	.389	23
Chicago White Sox	41	121	.253	45

=== Record vs. opponents ===
==== Record vs. American League ====
2024 American League record Source: MLB Standings Grid – 2024
Team	BAL	BOS	CWS	CLE	DET	HOU	KC	LAA	MIN	NYY	OAK	SEA	TB	TEX	TOR	NL
Baltimore	—	8–5	6–1	3–4	2–4	2–5	4–2	4–2	6–0	8–5	3–3	4–2	9–4	5–2	7–6	20–26
Boston	5–8	—	4–3	2–5	3–4	2–4	4–2	4–2	3–3	6–7	5–1	4–3	6–7	4–2	8–5	21–25
Chicago	1–6	3–4	—	5–8	3–10	2–4	1–12	4–2	1–12	1–5	3–3	1–6	4–2	0–7	1–5	11–35
Cleveland	4–3	5–2	8–5	—	7–6	1–4	5–8	5–1	10–3	2–4	6–1	4–2	3–4	4–2	4–2	24–22
Detroit	4–2	4–3	10–3	6–7	—	2–4	6–7	3–4	6–7	2–4	3–3	5–1	5–1	3–4	5–2	22–24
Houston	5–2	4–2	4–2	4–1	4–2	—	4–3	9–4	2–4	1–6	8–5	5–8	4–2	7–6	5–2	22–24
Kansas City	2–4	2–4	12–1	8–5	7–6	3–4	—	5–2	6–7	2–5	4–2	3–3	3–3	1–5	5–2	23–23
Los Angeles	2–4	2–4	2–4	1–5	4–3	4–9	2–5	—	1–5	3–3	5–8	8–5	3–4	4–9	0–7	22–24
Minnesota	0–6	3–3	12–1	3–10	7–6	4–2	7–6	5–1	—	0–6	6–1	5–2	3–4	5–2	4–2	18–28
New York	5–8	7–6	5–1	4–2	4–2	6–1	5–2	3–3	6–0	—	5–2	4–3	7–6	3–3	7–6	23–23
Oakland	3–3	1–5	3–3	1–6	3–3	5–8	2–4	8–5	1–6	2–5	—	4–9	3–4	6–7	3–3	24–22
Seattle	2–4	3–4	6–1	2–4	1–5	8–5	3–3	5–8	2–5	3–4	9–4	—	3–3	10–3	2–4	26–20
Tampa Bay	4–9	7–6	2–4	4–3	1–5	2–4	3–3	4–3	4–3	6–7	4–3	3–3	—	1–5	9–4	26–20
Texas	2–5	2–4	7–0	2–4	4–3	6–7	5–1	9–4	2–5	3–3	7–6	3–10	5–1	—	2–4	19–27
Toronto	6–7	5–8	5–1	2–4	2–5	2–5	2–5	7–0	2–4	6–7	3–3	4–2	4–9	4–2	—	20–26

Updated with the results of all games through September 30, 2024.

==== Record vs. National League ====
2024 American League record vs. National League Source: MLB Standings
Team	AZ	ATL	CHC	CIN	COL	LAD	MIA	MIL	NYM	PHI	PIT	SD	SF	STL	WSH
Baltimore	2–1	2–1	0–3	3–0	2–1	1–2	1–2	1–2	1–2	2–1	1–2	1–2	1–2	0–3	2–2
Boston	0–3	1–3	2–1	2–1	1–2	0–3	3–0	1–2	0–3	2–1	3–0	1–2	2–1	1–2	2–1
Chicago	1–2	2–1	0–4	0–3	2–1	0–3	1–2	0–3	0–3	0–3	0–3	0–3	1–2	2–1	2–1
Cleveland	0–3	1–2	3–0	3–1	1–2	1–2	2–1	0–3	3–0	2–1	2–1	1–2	2–1	1–2	2–1
Detroit	2–1	0–3	1–2	3–0	2–1	2–1	1–2	1–2	2–1	1–2	2–2	1–2	1–2	2–1	1–2
Houston	2–1	0–3	0–3	0–3	4–0	2–1	3–0	2–1	2–1	1–2	1–2	1–2	1–2	2–1	1–2
Kansas City	1–2	1–2	1–2	3–0	1–2	1–2	2–1	2–1	1–2	1–2	2–1	1–2	0–3	3–1	3–0
Los Angeles	1–2	1–2	1–2	0–3	1–2	2–2	3–0	1–2	2–1	1–2	2–1	3–0	2–1	1–2	1–2
Minnesota	2–1	0–3	1–2	1–2	2–1	1–2	1–2	1–3	1–2	2–1	1–2	1–2	1–2	1–2	2–1
New York	2–1	1–2	2–1	0–3	2–1	1–2	2–1	2–1	0–4	3–0	1–2	2–1	3–0	1–2	1–2
Oakland	1–2	1–2	2–1	2–1	2–1	1–2	2–1	1–2	2–1	2–1	3–0	0–3	2–2	1–2	2–1
Seattle	2–1	2–1	1–2	3–0	2–1	0–3	1–2	1–2	3–0	2–1	1–2	3–1	2–1	2–1	1–2
Tampa Bay	3–0	1–2	2–1	2–1	2–1	1–2	3–1	1–2	3–0	0–3	2–1	1–2	2–1	1–2	2–1
Texas	2–2	1–2	2–1	2–1	0–3	2–1	2–1	0–3	1–2	0–3	2–1	1–2	1–2	1–2	2–1
Toronto	1–2	1–2	1–2	1–2	2–1	1–2	0–3	1–2	1–2	1–3	2–1	2–1	2–1	3–0	1–2

Updated with the results of all games through September 30, 2024.

== Game log ==
=== Regular season ===
Legend
Rangers Win	Rangers Loss	Game postponed	Eliminated from playoff race

2024 Game Log: 78–84 (Home: 44–37; Away: 34–47)
March/April: 16–14 (Home: 9–8; Away: 7–6)

#	Date	Opponent	Score	Win	Loss	Save	Attendance	Record	Streak
1	March 28	Cubs	4–3 (10)	Robertson (1–0)	Smyly (0–1)	—	42,130	1–0	W1
2	March 30	Cubs	11–2	Bradford (1–0)	Hendricks (0–1)	—	37,570	2–0	W2
3	March 31	Cubs	5–9	Neris (1–0)	Leclerc (0–1)	—	32,078	2–1	L1
4	April 1	@ Rays	9–3	Dunning (1–0)	Pepiot (0–1)	—	14,144	3–1	W1
5	April 2	@ Rays	2–5	Eflin (1–1)	Heaney (0–1)	—	11,697	3–2	L1
6	April 3	@ Rays	4–1	Eovaldi (1–0)	Civale (1–1)	—	18,881	4–2	W1
7	April 5	Astros	10–2	Bradford (2–0)	Brown (0–1)	—	34,583	5–2	W2
8	April 6	Astros	7–2	Yates (1–0)	France (0–1)	Leclerc (1)	39,594	6–2	W3
9	April 7	Astros	1–3	Blanco (2–0)	Dunning (1–1)	Hader (1)	35,681	6–3	L1
10	April 8	Astros	5–10	Martinez (1–0)	Heaney (0–2)	—	31,737	6–4	L2
11	April 9	Athletics	3–4	Kelly (1–0)	Leclerc (0–2)	Miller (1)	18,714	6–5	L3
12	April 10	Athletics	6–2	Bradford (3–0)	Stripling (0–3)	—	30,488	7–5	W1
13	April 11	Athletics	0–1	Sears (1–1)	Gray (0–1)	Miller (2)	19,726	7–6	L1
14	April 12	@ Astros	12–8	Dunning (2–1)	France (0–2)	—	39,842	8–6	W1
15	April 13	@ Astros	2–9	Abreu (1–1)	Ureña (0–1)	—	38,574	8–7	L1
16	April 14	@ Astros	5–8	Javier (2–0)	Eovaldi (1–1)	—	36,759	8–8	L2
17	April 15	@ Tigers	1–0	Lorenzen (1–0)	Olson (0–2)	Yates (1)	12,005	9–8	W1
18	April 16	@ Tigers	2–4	Chafin (1–0)	Ureña (0–2)	Foley (5)	10,377	9–9	L1
19	April 17	@ Tigers	5–4	Yates (2–0)	Miller (3–1)	—	10,259	10–9	W1
20	April 18	@ Tigers	9–7	Leclerc (1–2)	Miller (3–2)	Yates (2)	11,339	11–9	W2
21	April 19	@ Braves	3–8	Sale (2–1)	Latz (0–1)	—	40,810	11–10	L1
22	April 20	@ Braves	2–5	Morton (2–0)	Eovaldi (1–2)	Iglesias (6)	41,744	11–11	L2
23	April 21	@ Braves	6–4	Lorenzen (2–0)	Vines (0–1)	Yates (3)	36,581	12–11	W1
24	April 23	Mariners	0–4	Gilbert (2–0)	Dunning (2–2)	—	27,295	12–12	L1
25	April 24	Mariners	5–1	Hernández (1–0)	Miller (3–2)	—	31,896	13–12	W1
26	April 25	Mariners	3–4	Castillo (2–4)	Heaney (0–3)	Muñoz (3)	21,782	13–13	L1
27	April 26	Reds	2–1	Leclerc (2–2)	Sims (1–1)	Yates (4)	28,396	14–13	W1
28	April 27	Reds	4–8	Greene (1–2)	Lorenzen (2–1)	Díaz (6)	36,553	14–14	L1
29	April 28	Reds	4–3	Dunning (3–2)	Abbott (1–3)	Yates (5)	37,008	15–14	W1
30	April 30	Nationals	7–1	Gray (1–1)	Gore (2–3)	—	27,584	16–14	W2

May: 11–16 (Home: 5–5; Away: 6–11)

#	Date	Opponent	Score	Win	Loss	Save	Attendance	Record	Streak
31	May 1	Nationals	0–1	Williams (3–0)	Heaney (0–4)	Finnegan (10)	24,846	16–15	L1
32	May 2	Nationals	6–0	Eovaldi (2–2)	Parker (2–1)	—	27,529	17–15	W1
33	May 3	@ Royals	1–7	Schreiber (3–0)	Winn (0–1)	—	25,690	17–16	L1
34	May 4	@ Royals	15–4	Sborz (1–0)	Wacha (1–4)	—	26,002	18–16	W1
35	May 5	@ Royals	3–2 (10)	Yates (3–0)	McArthur (1–1)	Robertson (1)	20,613	19–16	W2
36	May 6	@ Athletics	4–2	Leclerc (3–2)	Erceg (1–2)	Yates (6)	2,895	20–16	W3
37	May 7	@ Athletics	15–8	Ureña (1–2)	Stripling (1–6)	—	3,965	21–16	W4
38	May 8 (1)	@ Athletics	4–9	Sears (3–2)	Lorenzen (2–2)	—	see 2nd game	21–17	L1
39	May 8 (2)	@ Athletics	12–11	Robertson (2–0)	Bido (0–1)	Yates (7)	8,230	22–17	W1
40	May 10	@ Rockies	2–4	Bird (1–1)	Anderson (0–1)	Beeks (2)	32,693	22–18	L1
41	May 11	@ Rockies	3–8	Kinley (2–0)	Robertson (2–1)	—	37,527	22–19	L2
42	May 12	@ Rockies	1–3	Blach (1–1)	Ureña (1–3)	Beeks (3)	35,207	22–20	L3
43	May 13	Guardians	0–7	Gaddis (2–1)	Leclerc (3–3)	—	27,100	22–21	L4
44	May 14	Guardians	4–7	Lively (2–2)	Leiter (0–1)	Clase (12)	33,885	22–22	L5
45	May 15	Guardians	4–0	Gray (2–1)	Carrasco (2–4)	—	29,276	23–22	W1
46	May 17	Angels	3–9	Anderson (4–4)	Heaney (0–5)	—	37,922	23–23	L1
47	May 18	Angels	3–2 (13)	Rodríguez (1–0)	Fulmer (0–2)	—	36,457	24–23	W1
48	May 19	Angels	1–4	Soriano (2–4)	Lorenzen (2–3)	García (2)	36,009	24–24	L1
49	May 21	@ Phillies	2–5	Suárez (9–0)	Gray (2–2)	Alvarado (9)	41,083	24–25	L2
50	May 22	@ Phillies	4–11	Strahm (3–0)	Dunning (3–3)	—	39,595	24–26	L3
51	May 23	@ Phillies	2–5	Wheeler (6–3)	Heaney (0–6)	Hoffman (4)	42,377	24–27	L4
52	May 24	@ Twins	2–3	Ober (5–2)	Ureña (1–4)	Durán (5)	21,857	24–28	L5
53	May 25	@ Twins	3–5	Sands (2–0)	Robertson (2–2)	Durán (6)	30,957	24–29	L6
54	May 26	@ Twins	6–2	Latz (1–1)	López (4–5)	—	27,917	25–29	W1
55	May 28	Diamondbacks	4–2	Heaney (1–6)	Pfaadt (2–4)	Yates (8)	37,977	26–29	W2
56	May 29	Diamondbacks	6–1	Dunning (4–3)	Nelson (3–4)	—	34,023	27–29	W3
57	May 31	@ Marlins	2–8	Cronin (1–2)	Ureña (1–5)	—	11,687	27–30	L1

June: 11–16 (Home: 6–6; Away: 5–10)

#	Date	Opponent	Score	Win	Loss	Save	Attendance	Record	Streak
58	June 1	@ Marlins	7–0	Lorenzen (3–3)	Weathers (3–5)	—	21,388	28–30	W1
59	June 2	@ Marlins	6–0	Heaney (2–6)	Rogers (1–7)	—	13,351	29–30	W2
60	June 3	Tigers	1–2	Brieske (1–0)	Leclerc (3–4)	—	28,620	29–31	L1
61	June 4	Tigers	1–3	Flaherty (3–4)	Dunning (4–4)	Foley (12)	35,095	29–32	L2
62	June 5	Tigers	9–1	Ureña (2–5)	Wentz (0–1)	—	29,748	30–32	W1
63	June 7	Giants	2–5	Webb (5–5)	Robertson (2–3)	Doval (10)	35,868	30–33	L1
64	June 8	Giants	1–3	Miller (1–2)	Heaney (2–7)	Doval (11)	34,843	30–34	L2
65	June 9	Giants	7–2	Eovaldi (3–2)	Winn (3–7)	—	34,912	31–34	W1
66	June 11	@ Dodgers	2–15	Paxton (6–1)	Dunning (4–5)	—	51,416	31–35	L1
67	June 12	@ Dodgers	3–2	Latz (2–1)	Buehler (1–4)	Yates (9)	48,930	32–35	W1
68	June 13	@ Dodgers	3–1	Lorenzen (4–3)	Grove (4–3)	Yates (10)	50,134	33–35	W2
69	June 14	@ Mariners	2–3	Castillo (6–7)	Heaney (2–8)	Stanek (6)	41,814	33–36	L1
70	June 15	@ Mariners	5–7	Kirby (6–5)	Eovaldi (3–3)	Stanek (7)	43,448	33–37	L2
71	June 16	@ Mariners	0–5	Gilbert (4–4)	Dunning (4–6)	—	45,584	33–38	L3
72	June 17	Mets	2–14	Peterson (3–0)	Gray (2–3)	—	32,590	33–39	L4
73	June 18	Mets	6–7	Garrett (7–2)	Yates (3–1)	Díaz (7)	36,274	33–40	L5
74	June 19	Mets	5–3	Ureña (3–5)	Smith (1–1)	Yates (11)	36,095	34–40	W1
75	June 21	Royals	6–2	Eovaldi (4–3)	Schreiber (3–2)	—	37,678	35–40	W2
76	June 22	Royals	6–0	Gray (3–3)	Wacha (4–6)	—	38,301	36–40	W3
77	June 23	Royals	4–0	Scherzer (1–0)	Marsh (5–5)	Ureña (1)	35,762	37–40	W4
78	June 24	@ Brewers	3–6	Peguero (5–2)	Latz (2–2)	Megill (16)	27,924	37–41	L1
79	June 25	@ Brewers	1–3	Wilson (5–3)	Heaney (2–9)	Peguero (2)	30,892	37–42	L2
80	June 26	@ Brewers	5–6 (10)	Koenig (7–1)	Latz (2–3)	—	36,552	37–43	L3
81	June 27	@ Orioles	2–11	Burnes (9–3)	Gray (3–4)	—	29,479	37–44	L4
82	June 28	@ Orioles	1–2	Suárez (4–2)	Scherzer (1–1)	Kimbrel (18)	27,666	37–45	L5
83	June 29	@ Orioles	5–6	Povich (1–2)	Lorenzen (4–4)	Kimbrel (19)	44,286	37–46	L6
84	June 30	@ Orioles	11–2	Heaney (3–9)	Irvin (6–5)	—	23,439	38–46	W1

July: 14–11 (Home: 9–4; Away: 5–7)

#	Date	Opponent	Score	Win	Loss	Save	Attendance	Record	Streak
85	July 2	Padres	7–0	Eovaldi (5–3)	Cease (7–7)	—	33,965	39–46	W2
86	July 3	Padres	4–6	Morejón (2–1)	Dunning (4–7)	Suárez (21)	37,859	39–47	L1
87	July 4	Padres	1–3	King (7–5)	Scherzer (1–2)	Suárez (22)	38,607	39–48	L2
88	July 5	Rays	3–0	Lorenzen (5–4)	Baz (0–1)	Yates (12)	32,175	40–48	W1
89	July 6	Rays	4–3	Hernández (2–0)	Kelly (2–1)	Yates (13)	31,560	41–48	W2
90	July 7	Rays	13–2	Eovaldi (6–3)	Littell (3–6)	—	32,113	42–48	W3
91	July 8	@ Angels	9–4	Gray (4–4)	Daniel (1–2)	—	25,193	43–48	W4
92	July 9	@ Angels	5–4	Leclerc (4–4)	García (3–1)	Yates (14)	23,791	44–48	W5
93	July 10	@ Angels	2–7	Crouse (1–0)	Lorenzen (5–5)	—	23,230	44–49	L1
94	July 12	@ Astros	3–6	Brown (7–6)	Heaney (3–10)	Hader (18)	39,666	44–50	L2
95	July 13	@ Astros	2–1 (10)	Robertson (3–3)	Scott (6–3)	Yates (15)	42,094	45–50	W1
96	July 14	@ Astros	4–2	Sborz (2–0)	Blanco (9–4)	Yates (16)	38,622	46–50	W2
94th All-Star Game: Arlington, TX
97	July 19	Orioles	1–9	Burnes (10–4)	Eovaldi (6–4)	—	36,336	46–51	L1
98	July 20	Orioles	4–8	Rodriguez (12–4)	Scherzer (1–3)	—	38,410	46–52	L2
99	July 21	Orioles	3–2	Heaney (4–10)	Kremer (4–6)	Yates (17)	31,808	47–52	W1
100	July 22	White Sox	4–3 (10)	Hernández (3–0)	Wilson (1–6)	—	30,832	48–52	W2
101	July 23	White Sox	3–2	Gray (5–4)	Crochet (6–7)	Yates (18)	39,240	49–52	W3
102	July 24	White Sox	10–2	Eovaldi (7–4)	Flexen (2–10)	—	36,989	50–52	W4
103	July 25	White Sox	2–1	Scherzer (2–3)	Cannon (1–5)	Robertson (2)	32,913	51–52	W5
104	July 26	@ Blue Jays	5–6	Green (3–2)	Sborz (2–1)	—	35,065	51–53	L1
105	July 27	@ Blue Jays	3–7	Gausman (9–8)	Lorenzen (5–6)	—	35,917	51–54	L2
106	July 28	@ Blue Jays	3–7	Berríos (9–8)	Hernández (3–1)	Pop (1)	40,052	51–55	L3
107	July 29	@ Cardinals	6–3	Eovaldi (8–4)	Pallante (4–5)	Yates (19)	34,281	52–55	W1
108	July 30	@ Cardinals	1–8	Lynn (6–4)	Scherzer (2–4)	—	32,395	52–56	L1
109	July 31	@ Cardinals	1–10	McGreevy (1–0)	Heaney (4–11)	—	31,365	52–57	L2

August: 12–15 (Home: 6–9; Away: 6–6)

#	Date	Opponent	Score	Win	Loss	Save	Attendance	Record	Streak
110	August 2	Red Sox	6–11	Crawford (7–8)	Ureña (3–6)	—	35,669	52–58	L3
111	August 3	Red Sox	7–4	Leclerc (5–4)	Houck (8–8)	Yates (20)	39,414	53–58	W1
112	August 4	Red Sox	2–7	Booser (2–2)	Eovaldi (8–5)	—	34,532	53–59	L1
113	August 5	Astros	4–3 (10)	Yates (4–1)	Ferguson (1–4)	—	31,605	54–59	W1
114	August 6	Astros	2–4	Valdez (11–5)	Mahle (0–1)	Hader (23)	34,458	54–60	L1
115	August 7	Astros	4–6	Kikuchi (5–9)	Ureña (3–7)	Hader (24)	33,181	54–61	L2
—	August 9	@ Yankees	Postponed (rain); Makeup: August 10						
116	August 10 (1)	@ Yankees	0–8	Rodón (13–7)	Eovaldi (8–6)	—	see 2nd game	54–62	L3
117	August 10 (2)	@ Yankees	9–4	Bradford (4–0)	Weaver (4–3)	—	41,996	55–62	W1
118	August 11	@ Yankees	7–8	Stroman (8–6)	Heaney (4–12)	Holmes (25)	45,318	55–63	L1
119	August 12	@ Red Sox	4–5 (10)	Winckowski (3–1)	Garabito (0–1)	—	35,715	55–64	L2
120	August 13	@ Red Sox	4–9	Crawford (8–9)	Ureña (3–8)	Jansen (22)	34,522	55–65	L3
121	August 14	@ Red Sox	9–7 (10)	Festa (1–1)	Kelly (4–2)	Yates (21)	35,366	56–65	W1
122	August 15	Twins	2–3	Alcalá (3–3)	Yates (4–2)	Durán (17)	29,558	56–66	L1
123	August 16	Twins	3–4	Woods Richardson (4–3)	Heaney (4–13)	Durán (18)	28,705	56–67	L2
124	August 17	Twins	2–5	Henríquez (1–0)	Eovaldi (8–7)	Sands (4)	31,192	56–68	L3
125	August 18	Twins	6–5 (10)	Chafin (4–2)	Durán (6–6)	—	30,735	57–68	W1
126	August 19	Pirates	4–3	Ureña (4–8)	Ortiz (5–4)	Yates (22)	28,229	58–68	W2
127	August 20	Pirates	0–4	Keller (11–7)	Bradford (4–1)	—	25,074	58–69	L1
128	August 21	Pirates	1–0	Yates (5–2)	Bednar (3–6)	—	28,707	59–69	W1
129	August 23	@ Guardians	5–3	Eovaldi (9–7)	Bibee (10–6)	Yates (23)	33,786	60–69	W2
130	August 24	@ Guardians	5–13	Lively (11–8)	Gray (5–5)	—	33,037	60–70	L1
131	August 25	@ Guardians	2–4	Boyd (1–0)	Bradford (4–2)	Clase (38)	28,970	60–71	L2
—	August 27	@ White Sox	Suspended (rain); Resuming: August 28						
132	August 28 (1)	@ White Sox	3–1	Festa (2–1)	Flexen (2–13)	Yates (24)	see 2nd game	61–71	W1
133	August 28 (2)	@ White Sox	4–3	Ureña (5–8)	Anderson (1–1)	Anderson (1)	11,285	62–71	W2
134	August 29	@ White Sox	2–1	Eovaldi (10–7)	Nastrini (0–6)	Yates (25)	10,402	63–71	W3
135	August 30	Athletics	2–9	Sears (11–9)	Gray (5–6)	—	28,111	63–72	L1
136	August 31	Athletics	3–2	Kirby Yates (6–2)	Ferguson (2–2)	—	28,454	64–72	W1

September: 14–12 (Home: 9–5; Away: 5–7)

#	Date	Opponent	Score	Win	Loss	Save	Attendance	Record	Streak
137	September 1	Athletics	6–4 (10)	Festa (3–1)	Miller (1–2)	—	33,309	65–72	W2
138	September 2	Yankees	4–8	Cole (6–3)	Leiter (0–2)	—	36,815	65–73	L1
139	September 3	Yankees	7–4	Pennington (1–0)	Holmes (2–5)	—	29,356	66–73	W1
140	September 4	Yankees	10–6	Eovaldi (11–7)	Stroman (10–7)	Yates (26)	32,223	67–73	W2
141	September 5	Angels	3–1	Bradford (5–2)	Kochanowicz (2–4)	Yates (27)	22,926	68–73	W3
142	September 6	Angels	1–5	Aldegheri (1–1)	Garabito (0–2)	—	31,014	68–74	L1
143	September 7	Angels	6–4	Leclerc (6–4)	Mederos (0–1)	Yates (28)	31,501	69–74	W1
144	September 8	Angels	7–4	Heaney (5–13)	Dana (1–1)	Yates (29)	32,240	70–74	W2
145	September 10	@ Diamondbacks	0–6	Gallen (12–6)	Eovaldi (11–8)	—	25,499	70–75	L1
146	September 11	@ Diamondbacks	4–14	Floro (6–4)	Bradford (5–3)	Montgomery (1)	20,473	70–76	L2
147	September 12	@ Mariners	5–4	Festa (4–1)	Snider (3–3)	Yates (30)	22,212	71–76	W1
148	September 13	@ Mariners	4–5	Chargois (3–1)	Robertson (3–4)	Muñoz (21)	32,996	71–77	L1
149	September 14	@ Mariners	4–5	Muñoz (3–6)	Leclerc (6–5)	—	33,629	71–78	L2
150	September 15	@ Mariners	0–7	Kirby (12–11)	Heaney (5–14)	—	36,137	71–79	L3
151	September 17	Blue Jays	13–8	Festa (5–1)	Nance (0–2)	—	29,906	72–79	W1
152	September 18	Blue Jays	2–0	Bradford (6–3)	Francis (8–5)	Yates (31)	34,625	73–79	W2
153	September 19	Blue Jays	0–4	Gausman (13–11)	Rocker (0–1)	—	30,384	73–80	L1
154	September 20	Mariners	2–8	Kirby (13–10)	Leiter (0–3)	—	33,387	73–81	L2
155	September 21	Mariners	4–8	Hancock (4–4)	Chafin (4–3)	—	39,929	73–82	L3
156	September 22	Mariners	6–5	Yates (7–2)	Muñoz (3–7)	—	39,882	74–82	W1
157	September 24	@ Athletics	4–5	Miller (2–2)	Sborz (2–2)	—	30,402	74–83	L1
158	September 25	@ Athletics	5–1	Festa (6–1)	Basso (1–1)	—	35,270	75–83	W1
159	September 26	@ Athletics	2–3	Ginn (1–1)	Rocker (0–2)	Miller (28)	46,889	75–84	L1
160	September 27	@ Angels	5–2	Robert (1–0)	Detmers (4–9)	Yates (32)	39,308	76–84	W1
161	September 28	@ Angels	9–8	Dunning (5–7)	Quijada (2–2)	Yates (33)	41,560	77–84	W2
162	September 29	@ Angels	8–0	Eovaldi (12–8)	Kochanowicz (2–6)	—	35,145	78–84	W3

=== Detailed records ===
American League
Opponent	Home	Away	Total	Pct.	Runs scored	Runs allowed
AL East
Baltimore Orioles	1–2	1–3	2–5	.286	27	40
Boston Red Sox	1–2	1–2	2–4	.333	32	43
New York Yankees	2–1	1–2	3–3	.500	37	38
Tampa Bay Rays	3–0	2–1	5–1	.833	35	14
Toronto Blue Jays	0–0	0–3	0–3	.000	11	20
	7–5	5–11	12–16	.429	142	155
AL Central
Chicago White Sox	4–0	3–0	7–0	1.000	28	13
Cleveland Guardians	1–2	1–2	2–4	.333	20	34
Detroit Tigers	1–2	3–1	4–3	.571	28	21
Kansas City Royals	3–0	2–1	5–1	.833	35	15
Minnesota Twins	1–3	1–2	2–5	.286	24	27
	10–7	10–6	20–13	.606	135	110
AL West
Houston Astros	3–4	3–3	6–7	.462	61	64
Los Angeles Angels	4–3	2–1	6–4	.600	40	44
Oakland Athletics	3–3	3–1	6–4	.600	55	52
Seattle Mariners	1–2	1–3	2–5	.286	20	28
Texas Rangers	—	—	—	—	—	—
	11–12	9–8	20–20	.500	176	188

National League
Opponent	Home	Away	Total	Pct.	Runs scored	Runs allowed
NL East
Atlanta Braves	0–0	1–2	1–2	.333	11	17
Miami Marlins	0–0	2–1	2–1	.667	15	8
New York Mets	1–2	0–0	1–2	.333	13	24
Philadelphia Phillies	0–0	0–3	0–3	.000	8	21
Washington Nationals	2–1	0–0	2–1	.667	13	2
	3–3	3–6	6–9	.400	60	72
NL Central
Chicago Cubs	2–1	0–0	2–1	.667	20	14
Cincinnati Reds	2–1	0–0	2–1	.667	10	12
Milwaukee Brewers	0–0	0–3	0–3	.000	9	15
Pittsburgh Pirates	2–1	0–0	2–1	.667	5	7
St. Louis Cardinals	0–0	1–2	1–2	.333	8	21
	6–3	1–5	7–8	.467	52	69
NL West
Arizona Diamondbacks	2–0	0–2	2–2	.500	14	23
Colorado Rockies	0–0	0–3	0–3	.000	6	15
Los Angeles Dodgers	0–0	2–1	2–1	.667	8	18
San Diego Padres	1–2	0–0	1–2	.333	12	9
San Francisco Giants	1–2	0–0	1–2	.333	10	10
	4–4	2–6	6–10	.375	46	55

== Roster ==
2024 Texas Rangers
Roster
Pitchers: 45 Chase Anderson; 65 Grant Anderson; 52 Shaun Anderson; 61 Cody Bradford; 46 Brock Burke; 59 Andrew Chafin; 68 Marc Church; 48 Jacob deGrom; 33 Dane Dunning; 17 Nathan Eovaldi; 63 Matt Festa; 58 Gerson Garabito; 22 Jon Gray; 44 Andrew Heaney; 72 Jonathan Hernández; 67 Jake Latz; 25 José Leclerc; 35 Jack Leiter; 23 Michael Lorenzen; 51 Tyler Mahle; 52 Walter Pennington; 49 Austin Pruitt; 57 Daniel Robert; 37 David Robertson; 80 Kumar Rocker; 57 Yerry Rodríguez; 66 Josh Sborz; 31 Max Scherzer; 59 Jesús Tinoco; 54 José Ureña; 43 Owen White; 60 Cole Winn; 39 Kirby Yates	Catchers: 28 Jonah Heim; 18 Carson Kelly; 55 Sam Huff; 12 Andrew Knizner; Infielders: 9 Matt Duffy; 20 Ezequiel Durán; 56 Justin Foscue; 6 Josh Jung; 30 Nathaniel Lowe; 21 Jonathan Ornelas; 5 Corey Seager; 2 Marcus Semien; 8 Josh H. Smith; 21 Jared Walsh; 38 Davis Wendzel	Outfielders: 32 Evan Carter; 40 Sandro Fabian; 53 Adolis García; 4 Robbie Grossman; 40 Derek Hill; 16 Travis Jankowski; 36 Wyatt Langford; 3 Leody Taveras; Other batters: 38 Dustin Harris	Manager: 15 Bruce Bochy; Coaches: 27 Tony Beasley (third base); 86 Seth Conner (assistant hitting); 14 Donnie Ecker (bench/offensive coordinator); 87 Brett Hayes (bullpen); 75 Tim Hyers (hitting); 41 Mike Maddux (pitching); 64 Corey Ragsdale (first base); 83 Will Venable (associate manager); 88 Bobby Wilson (catching)

== Player stats ==
= Indicates team leader

=== Batting ===
Note: G = Games played; AB = At bats; R = Runs scored; H = Hits; 2B = Doubles; 3B = Triples; HR = Home runs; RBI = Runs batted in; SB = Stolen bases; BB = Walks; AVG = Batting average; SLG = Slugging average

Player	G	AB	R	H	2B	3B	HR	RBI	SB	BB	AVG	SLG
Marcus Semien	159	650	101	154	27	2	23	74	8	64	.237	.391
Adolis Garcia	154	580	68	130	27	0	25	85	11	45	.224	.400
Josh Smith	149	523	67	135	30	1	13	62	11	46	.258	.394
Wyatt Langford	134	499	74	126	25	4	16	74	19	51	.253	.415
Nathaniel Lowe	140	486	62	129	16	1	16	69	2	71	.265	.401
Leody Taveras	151	480	59	110	17	3	12	44	23	42	.229	.352
Corey Seager	123	475	68	132	21	0	30	74	1	53	.278	.512
Jonah Heim	131	459	45	101	12	1	13	59	1	26	.220	.336
Ezequiel Durán	92	268	26	66	11	0	3	20	1	14	.246	.321
Travis Jankowski	104	190	19	38	5	0	1	12	11	12	.200	.242
Josh Jung	46	178	19	47	5	1	7	16	4	8	.264	.421
Evan Carter	45	144	23	27	6	2	5	15	2	15	.188	.361
Robbie Grossman	46	105	13	25	4	0	3	10	1	16	.238	.362
Carson Kelly	31	102	11	24	5	0	2	8	0	8	.235	.343
Andrew Knizner	35	90	5	15	1	0	1	9	0	1	.167	.211
Jared Walsh	17	53	9	12	2	0	1	7	0	7	.226	.321
Davis Wendzel	27	47	2	6	2	0	1	2	0	1	.128	.234
Derek Hill	16	43	5	11	0	0	3	5	2	2	.256	.465
Justin Foscue	15	42	3	2	1	0	0	1	0	2	.048	.071
Jonathan Ornelas	18	37	1	8	2	0	0	3	0	2	.216	.270
Matt Duffy	4	7	2	2	0	0	0	0	0	2	.286	.286
Dustin Harris	2	6	1	2	1	0	1	3	0	1	.333	1.000
Sandro Fabian	3	5	0	0	0	0	0	0	0	0	.000	.000
Sam Huff	3	3	0	0	0	0	0	0	0	1	.000	.000
Team totals	162	5472	683	1302	220	15	176	652	97	'490	.238	.380

Source:Baseball Reference

=== Pitching ===
Note: W = Wins; L = Losses; ERA = Earned run average; G = Games pitched; GS = Games started; SV = Saves; IP = Innings pitched; H = Hits allowed; R = Runs allowed; ER = Earned runs allowed; BB = Walks allowed; SO = Strikeouts

Player	W	L	ERA	G	GS	SV	IP	H	R	ER	BB	SO
Nathan Eovaldi	12	8	3.80	29	29	0	170.2	147	74	72	42	166
Andrew Heaney	5	14	4.28	32	31	0	160.0	159	84	76	41	159
José Ureña	5	8	3.80	33	9	1	109.0	105	51	46	39	70
Jon Gray	5	6	4.47	23	19	0	102.2	107	54	51	28	86
Michael Lorenzen	5	6	3.81	19	18	0	101.2	82	43	43	48	75
Dane Dunning	5	7	5.31	26	15	0	95.0	97	60	56	40	91
Cody Bradford	6	3	3.54	14	13	0	76.1	64	32	30	13	70
David Robertson	3	4	3.00	68	0	2	72.0	53	25	24	27	99
José Leclerc	6	5	4.32	64	0	1	66.2	56	33	32	32	89
Kirby Yates	7	2	1.17	61	0	33	61.2	23	10	8	28	85
Jacob Latz	2	3	3.71	46	0	0	43.2	39	20	18	27	40
Max Scherzer	2	4	3.95	9	9	0	43.1	40	20	19	10	40
Jonathan Hernández	3	1	5.05	26	1	0	41.0	39	25	23	26	36
Jack Leiter	0	3	8.83	9	6	0	35.2	44	39	35	17	31
Grant Anderson	0	1	8.10	23	0	1	26.2	33	24	24	10	29
Gerson Garabito	0	2	4.78	18	2	0	26.1	23	15	14	12	22
Matt Festa	6	0	4.37	18	0	0	22.2	17	13	11	7	23
Andrew Chafin	1	1	4.19	21	0	0	19.1	17	10	9	15	20
Cole Winn	0	1	7.79	13	0	0	17.1	18	15	15	4	14
Walter Pennington	1	0	3.12	15	1	0	17.1	19	7	6	11	16
Yerry Rodríguez	1	0	6.88	12	0	0	17.0	16	13	13	11	12
Josh Sborz	2	2	3.86	17	0	0	16.1	16	8	7	4	17
Brock Burke	0	0	9.22	13	0	0	13.2	21	14	14	9	16
Tyler Mahle	0	1	4.97	3	3	0	12.2	14	7	7	4	10
Kumar Rocker	0	2	3.86	3	3	0	11.2	12	6	5	6	14
Jacob deGrom	0	0	1.69	3	3	0	10.2	11	2	2	1	14
Jesús Tinoco	0	0	8.10	9	0	0	10.0	11	9	9	7	9
Chase Anderson	0	0	9.95	2	0	0	6.1	9	7	7	2	7
Daniel Robert	1	0	3.18	4	0	0	5.2	6	2	2	2	6
Austin Pruitt	0	0	12.46	4	0	0	4.1	8	6	6	3	1
Shaun Anderson	0	0	5.40	2	0	0	3.1	6	2	2	1	3
Andrew Knizner	0	0	0.00	2	0	0	3.0	1	0	0	2	0
Owen White	0	0	24.00	3	0	0	3.0	9	8	8	1	0
Marc Church	0	0	0.00	1	0	0	1.0	1	0	0	0	1
Team totals	78	84	4.35	162	162	38	1427.2	1323	738	690	530	1371

Source:Baseball Reference

== Farm system ==
Level	Team	League	Manager
Triple-A	Round Rock Express	Pacific Coast League	
Double-A	Frisco RoughRiders	Texas League	
High-A	Hickory Crawdads	South Atlantic League	
Low-A	Down East Wood Ducks	Carolina League	
Rookie	ACL Rangers	Arizona Complex League	
Foreign Rookie	DSL Rangers 1	Dominican Summer League	
Foreign Rookie	DSL Rangers 2	Dominican Summer League	
