= Davis =

Davis may refer to:

== Places ==
=== Antarctica ===
- Mount Davis (Antarctica)
- Davis Island (Palmer Archipelago)
- Davis Station, an Australian base and research outpost in the Vestfold Hills
- Davis Valley, Queen Elizabeth Land

=== Canada ===
- Davis, Saskatchewan, an unincorporated community
- Davis Strait, between Nunavut and Greenland
- Mount Davis (British Columbia)

=== United States ===
- Davis, California, the largest city with the name
- Davis, Illinois, a village
- Davis, Massachusetts, an abandoned mining village
- Davis, Missouri, an unincorporated community
- Davis, North Carolina, an unincorporated community and census-designated place
- Davis, Oklahoma, a city
- Davis, South Dakota, a town
- Davis, West Virginia, a town
- Davis, Logan County, West Virginia, an unincorporated community
- Davis Island (Connecticut)
- Davis Island (Mississippi)
- Davis Island (Pennsylvania)
- Davis Peak (Washington)
- Fort Davis, Oklahoma
- Mount Davis (California)
- Mount Davis (New Hampshire)
- Mount Davis (Pennsylvania)

=== Other ===
- Than Kyun or Davis Island, Burma
- Mount Davis, Hong Kong

== Train stations ==
- Davis station (California), an Amtrak station in Davis, California
- Davis station (CTA), an elevated rapid transit station in Evanston, Illinois
- Evanston Davis Street station, a commuter rail station in Evanston, Illinois
- Davis station (MBTA), a subway station in Somerville, Massachusetts

== People and fictional characters ==
- Davis (surname)
  - List of people with surname Davis, a list of people and fictional characters
- Davis (given name), a list of people and fictional characters
- Dāvis, a list of people with the Latvian masculine given name

== Other uses ==
- Davis Cup, premier international team event in men's tennis
- University of California, Davis, also known as "UC Davis"
- Davis Entertainment, an American independent film production company
- Davis Motorcar Company, manufacturer of three-wheeled automobiles from 1947 to 1948
- "Davis", a song by Chaz Jankel from the album Chazablanca
- SirDavis, a brand of Japanese-inspired American whisky launched in 2024

== See also ==
- Davis Building (disambiguation)
- Davis County (disambiguation)
- Davis Township (disambiguation)
- Fort Davis (disambiguation)
- Davis's law, in anatomy and physiology
- Davis gun, the first true recoilless gun
- Davis wing, an aircraft wing design
- Justice Davis (disambiguation)
