= Davis (given name) =

Davis is a masculine given name.

According to one source, it derives from the French Devis.

It may refer to:

== People ==
=== A ===
- Davis Agesa (born 1995), Kenyan footballer
- Davis Alexander (born 1998), American football player
- Davis Allen (designer) (1916–1999), American interior designer
- Davis Allen (American football) (born 2001), American football player
- Davis Arinaitwe (born 1987), Ugandan cricketer
- Davis Atkin (born 2001), Australian field hockey player

=== B ===
- Davis Bautista (born 2005), Ecuadorian footballer
- Davis Evan Bedford (1898–1978), British physician
- Dāvis Bertāns (born 1992), Latvian basketball player
- Davis Bitton (1930–2007), American historian
- Davis Eugene Boster (1920–2005), American diplomat
- Davis Brin (born 2000), American football player
- Davis Burleson (born 2003), American social media personality

=== C ===
- Davis Carpenter (1799–1878), American politician
- Davis Cheek (born 1999), American football player
- Davis Chenge (born 1991), Kenyan rugby union footballer
- Davis Chiramel (born 1960), Indian priest
- Davis Chirchir (born 1960), Kenyan politician
- Davis Cleveland (born 2002), American actor
- Davis Coombe, American filmmaker
- Davis Croghan (1832–1890), Irish Archdeacon
- Davis Cunningham (1916–1984), American musician
- Davis Curiale (born 1987), Italian footballer

=== D ===
- Davis Daniel (born 1961), American musician
- Davis Daniel (baseball) (born 1997), American baseball player
- Davis Rich Dewey (1858–1942), American economist
- Davis Deza (born 1991), Peruvian footballer
- Davis Doi (born 1954), American animator
- Davis Drewiske (born 1984), American ice hockey player
- Davis Ducart (1699–1780), Irish architect

=== E ===
- Davis Earle (1937–2016), Canadian physicist
- Davis Elkins (1876–1959), American politician

=== F ===
- Davis Filfred (born 1967), American politician
- Davis Fisher (born 1997), American motorcycle racer
- Davis Floyd (1776–1834), American politician

=== G ===
- Davis Gaines (born 1959), American stage actor
- Davis Gillilan (1812–1852), American merchant
- Davis Granados (born 1981), Colombian footballer
- Davis Grubb (1919–1980), American novelist
- Davis Guggenheim (born 1963), American film director

=== H ===
- Davis Hughes (1910–2003), Australian politician

=== I ===
- Dāvis Ikaunieks (born 1994), Latvian footballer
- Dāvis Indrāns (born 1995), Latvian footballer

=== J ===
- Davis Idin Pareli Johansen (1926–2020), Norwegian politician
- Davis Joseph (born 1963), Canadian cricketer

=== K ===
- Davis Kamoga (born 1968), Ugandan athlete
- Davis Kamukama, Ugandan businessman
- Davis Katsonga (born 1955), Malawian politician
- Davis Keillor-Dunn (born 1997), English footballer
- Davis Kopi (born 1971), Botswanan footballer

=== L ===
- Davis Love Jr. (1935–1988), American golfer
- Davis Love III (born 1964), American golfer
- Davis Lusimbo (born 1966), Ugandan boxer

=== M ===
- Davis Mac-Iyalla (born 1972), Nigerian activist
- Davis Marapira, Zimbabwean politician
- Davis Martin (born 1997), American baseball player
- Davis McCaughey (1914–2005), Irish-Australian theologian
- Davis McCombs (born 1969), American poet
- Davis Mell (1604–1662), English clockmaker
- Davis Mensah (born 1991), Ghanaian-Italian footballer
- Davis Miller, American author
- Davis Mills (born 1998), American football player
- Davis Murwendo (born 1998), Zimbabwean cricketer
- Davis Mwale (born 1972), Zambian boxer
- Davis G. Mwamfupe (born 1956), Tanzanian politician

=== O ===
- Davis Ansah Opoku (born 1984), Ghanaian politician

=== P ===
- Davis Paul (born 1988), American soccer player
- Davis Payne (born 1970), Canadian ice hockey player
- Davis Peralta (born 1948), Panamanian basketball player
- Davis Pereira (born 1958), Brazilian cyclist
- Davis Phinney (born 1959), American cyclist

=== R ===
- Davis Richardson (died 1858), American politician
- Davis Riley (born 1996), American golfer
- Davis Roberts (1917–1993), American actor
- Davis Romero (born 1983), Panamanian baseball player
- Davis R. Ruark (born 1955), American lawyer

=== S ===
- Davis Sanchez (born 1974), American football player
- Davis Schneider (born 1999), American baseball player
- Davis Schneiderman (born 1974), American writer
- Davis Sessums (1858–1929), American bishop
- Davis F. Stakely (1883–1964), American judge
- Davis Steven, Papua New Guinean politician

=== T ===
- Davis Tarwater (born 1984), American swimmer
- Davis Thompson (born 1999), American golfer
- Davis Tull (born 1991), American football player

=== W ===
- Davis Hanson Waite (1825–1901), American politician
- Davis Warren (born 2002), American football player
- Davis Webb (born 1995), American football player
- Davis Wendzel (born 1997), American baseball player

== Fictional characters ==
- Davis Bloome, a character in the American TV series Smallville
- Davis Cameron (Slipstream), a character in Marvel Comics
- Davis MacLean, a character in the television series Power Book II: Ghost
- Davis Motomiya, a character in the anime series Digimon
- Davis Quinton, a character in the Canadian TV series Corner Gas

== See also ==
- List of people with the surname Davis, a page for people with the surname "Davis"
- Davis (disambiguation)
