= Davis Township, Indiana =

Davis Township is the name of two townships in the U.S. state of Indiana:

- Davis Township, Fountain County, Indiana
- Davis Township, Starke County, Indiana

== See also ==
- Davis Township (disambiguation)
