= Fort Davis =

Fort Davis may refer to the following.

- Fort Davis National Historic Site
- Fort Davis, Alaska
- Fort Davis, Alabama, unincorporated community in Macon County
- Fort Davis, Oklahoma
- Fort Davis, Panama
- Fort Davis, Texas
- Fort Davis (Washington, D.C.), a neighborhood of Washington, D.C.
- Cantonment Davis, a temporary fort built at the former location of Fort Johnson Illinois
- Fort Davis, Ireland
