= Ronel Blanco =

Dominican baseball player (born 1993)

Houston Astros – No. 56
- Pitcher
- Born: August 31, 1993 (age 33); Santiago, Dominican Republic
- Bats: Right Throws: Right

MLB debut
- April 8, 2022, for the Houston Astros

MLB statistics (through 2026 season)
- Win–loss record: 18–12
- Earned run average: 3.80
- Strikeouts: 302
- Stats at Baseball Reference

Teams
- Houston Astros (2022–present)

Career highlights and awards
- Pitched a no-hitter on April 1, 2024

Ronel De Jesus Blanco (born August 31, 1993) is a Dominican professional baseball pitcher for the Houston Astros of Major League Baseball (MLB). He signed with the Astros as an international free agent in 2016, and made his MLB debut in 2022. He threw a no-hitter against the Toronto Blue Jays in 2024.

== Career ==
=== 2016–2023 ===
Blanco was a corner infielder and outfielder before he began pitching at the age of 18, and signed with the Houston Astros as an international free agent on April 27, 2016, aged 22. He split the 2016 season between the DSL Astros and the GCL Astros, going a combined 7–1 with a 2.13 ERA and 59 strikeouts over 50 2/3 innings. Blanco split the 2017 season between the Quad Cities River Bandits and the Buies Creek Astros, going a combined 6–5 with a 3.38 ERA and 79 strikeouts over 88 innings. He split the 2018 season between Buies Creek and the Corpus Christi Hooks, going a combined 7–1 with a 3.65 ERA and 71 strikeouts over 56 2/3 innings. Blanco split the 2019 season between the Tri-City ValleyCats, Corpus Christi, and the Round Rock Express, going a combined 5–2 with a 4.96 ERA and 57 strikeouts over 49 innings. Blanco did not play in 2020 due to the cancellation of the Minor League Baseball season because of the COVID-19 pandemic. Blanco spent the 2021 season with the Sugar Land Skeeters.

On April 7, 2022, the Astros selected Blanco's contract and placed him on the major league roster. On April 9, he made his major league debut in the eighth inning against the Los Angeles Angels. On March 28, 2023, it was announced that Blanco had made the Astros' Opening Day roster for a second consecutive season. Blanco debuted as a starting pitcher in the major leagues on June 1, 2023, earning the win in a 5–2 final over the Angels after tossing 5 1/3 innings with seven hits, three walks, two earned runs allowed and five strikeouts.

=== 2024 ===
Blanco threw the first no-hitter of the 2024 MLB season on April 1, 2024, against the Toronto Blue Jays. The eighth start of his career, it was the seventeenth no-hitter in franchise history, and the tenth thrown by a Dominican pitcher. In his next start on April 7, Blanco tossed another 5 2/3 no-hit innings until a single hit by Adolis García of the Texas Rangers ended 14 2/3 consecutive no-hit innings. Blanco set an expansion-era record (since 1961) of 44 outs recorded to begin a season before allowing a hit. He was named the American League (AL) Player of the Week for the first time for the week ended April 7, 2024. Opposing batters went 1-for-46 in the same week. On May 14, during a game against the Oakland Athletics, Blanco was ejected due to a sticky substance found on his glove. The following day, he was suspended 10 games as a result of the ejection.

Blanco exited after seven hitless innings versus the Detroit Tigers on June 16 before Ryan Pressly allowed a single by Wenceel Pérez with two outs in the eighth. In August 2024, Blanco surpassed his previous career high as a professional in innings pitched (125 1/3), split between Triple-A and MLB in 2023. He remained unbeaten in his final nine starts of the season and posted a 0.75 ERA in four September starts.

For the 2024 season, Blanco posted a record of 2.80 ERA, 13–6 win–loss record, and 166 strikeouts in 167 1/3 innings over 30 games pitched with 29 pitching starts and 14 quality starts. He finished the 2024 season in 4th place of the list of ERA leaders, which he finished the regular season in the top 5. Blanco led the major leagues in batting average against (BAA, at .190) and hits per nine innings pitched (H/9, at 6.131), was third in the AL win–loss percentage (.684), and sixth in walks plus hits per inning pitched (WHIP, at 1.088). He also surrendered the fourth-most walks in the league (68) and the highest base-on-balls percentage in the major leagues (10.1%). Blanco was named the Astros' Pitcher of the Year by the Houston chapter of the Baseball Writers' Association of America (BBWAA).

Blanco made his major league postseason debut on October 1, 2024, in Game 1 of the AL Wild Card Series (WCS). Tossing two scoreless innings in relief, he maintained the Astros' deficit at 3–1 versus Detroit, who held on to win and eventually sweep the best-of-3 series. Blanco surrendered one hit, three walks, and struck out four.

=== 2025 ===
On May 11, 2025, Blanco established a career-high 11 strikeouts over eight innings to lead a 6–0, two-hit shutout of the Cincinnati Reds. On May 28, The Astros announced that Blanco would undergo ulnar collateral ligament reconstruction, ending his 2025 campaign.

=== 2026 ===
On July 20, 2026, Blanco was activated from the injured list in anticipation of his return from surgery. He made his season debut that day against the Miami Marlins, returning to major leagues 432 days after his last appearance. Blanco made eight appearances for the Astros, five being starts, going 0–1 with a 6.68 ERA and 1.366 WHIP over 33 2/3 innings.

== Awards ==
Awards won by Ronel Blanco
Award	Category	Result / section	Year	Ref.
Houston Astros	Pitcher of the Year		2024	

== Personal life ==
Blanco is married to wife Yanissa. Their second child was born in March 2024.

== See also ==
- List of Houston Astros no-hitters
- List of Major League Baseball no-hitters
- List of Major League Baseball players from the Dominican Republic

Awards and achievements
Preceded by Michael Lorenzen	No-hitter pitcher April 1, 2024	Succeeded by Dylan Cease
