= Shaun Anderson =

American baseball player (born 1994)

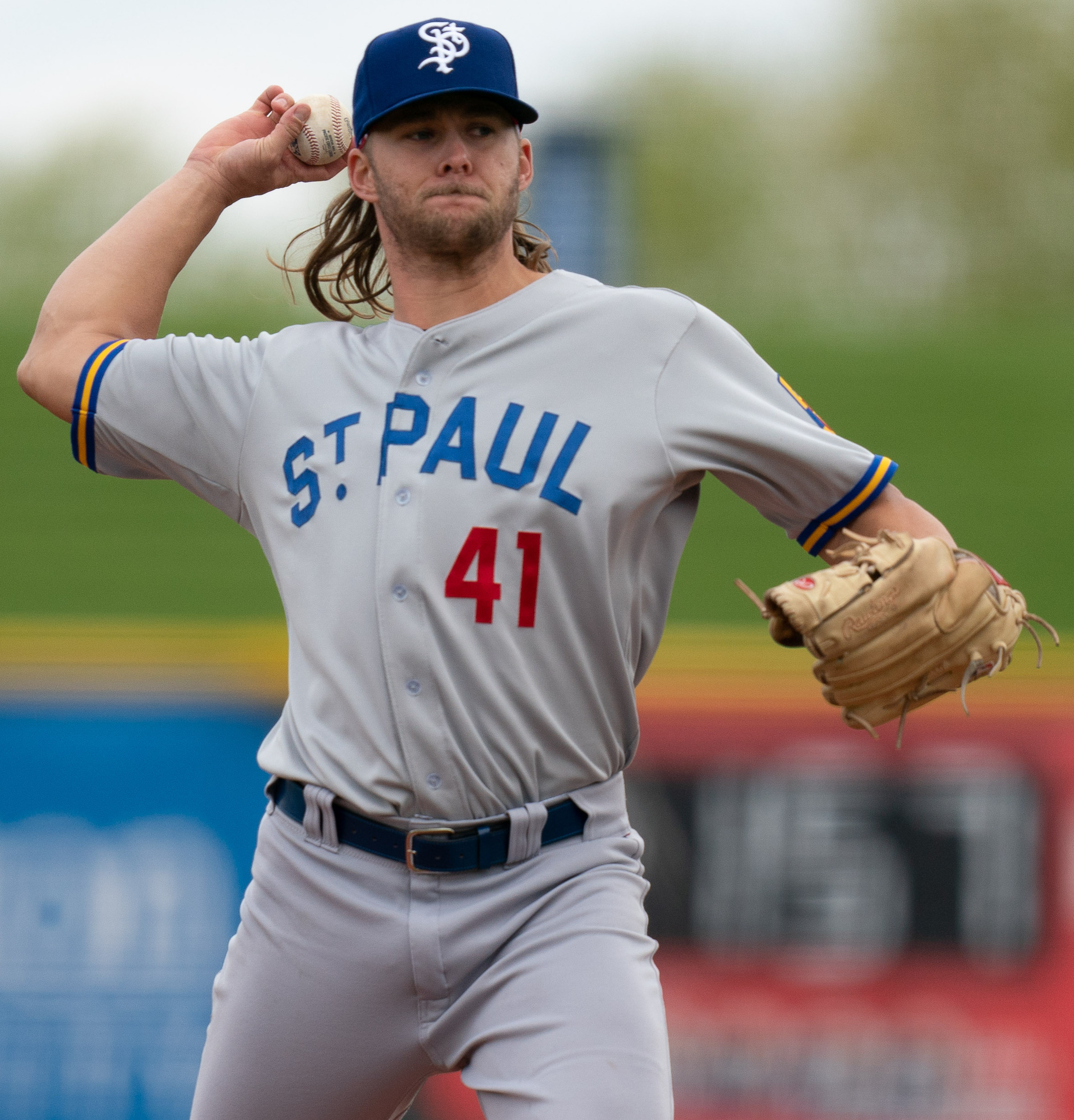
- Anderson with the St. Paul Saints in 2021

Free agent
- Pitcher
- Born: October 29, 1994 (age 32); Coral Springs, Florida, U.S.
- Bats: Right Throws: Right

Professional debut
- MLB: May 15, 2019, for the San Francisco Giants
- KBO: April 1, 2023, for the Kia Tigers

MLB statistics (through 2026 season)
- Win–loss record: 6–7
- Earned run average: 6.53
- Strikeouts: 145

KBO statistics (through 2023 season)
- Win–loss record: 4–7
- Earned run average: 3.76
- Strikeouts: 64
- Stats at Baseball Reference

Teams
- San Francisco Giants (2019–2020); Minnesota Twins (2021); Baltimore Orioles (2021); San Diego Padres (2021); Toronto Blue Jays (2022); Kia Tigers (2023); Texas Rangers (2024); Miami Marlins (2024); Los Angeles Angels (2025–2026)

Shaun Anderson (born October 29, 1994) is an American professional baseball pitcher who is a free agent. He has previously played in Major League Baseball (MLB) for the San Francisco Giants, Minnesota Twins, Baltimore Orioles, San Diego Padres, Toronto Blue Jays, Texas Rangers, Miami Marlins, and Los Angeles Angels. He has also played in the KBO League for the Kia Tigers. He played college baseball for the University of Florida and was drafted by the Boston Red Sox in the third round of the 2016 MLB draft.

== Amateur career ==
Anderson attended American Heritage High School in Plantation, Florida. His junior year he was 6-1 with an 0.77 ERA, and his senior year he was 12-1 with a 1.10 ERA. In the 2013 Major League Baseball draft, the Washington Nationals selected Anderson in the 40th round, with the 1,216th overall pick, the final pick in the draft.

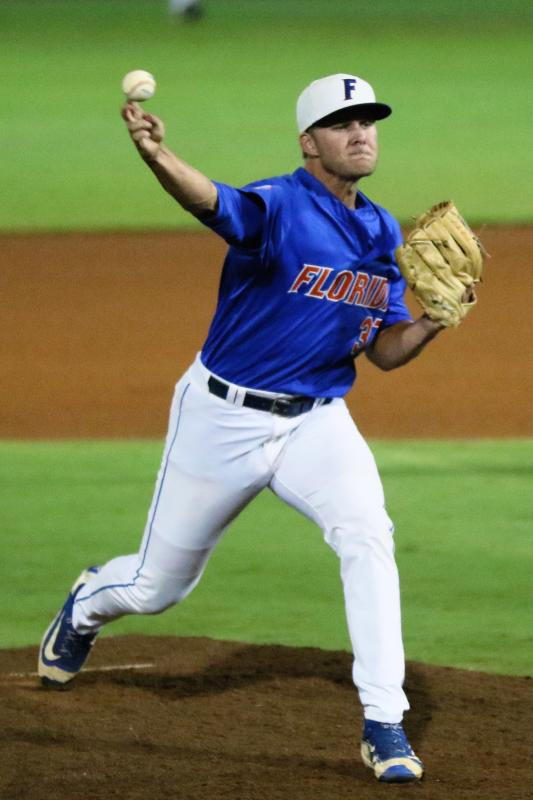
Anderson with the Florida Gators in 2016

Anderson enrolled at the University of Florida to play college baseball for the Florida Gators. He began his collegiate career as a starting pitcher, but transitioned into a relief pitcher. He started one game for the Gators, while spending the rest of his time with the Gators in relief. He played collegiate summer baseball as a starting pitcher for the Lakeshore Chinooks of the Northwoods League in 2014 and the Wareham Gatemen of the Cape Cod Baseball League in 2015. In 2016, as a junior he pitched to a 3–0 win–loss record and a 0.97 earned run average (ERA) with 13 saves (leading the SEC) in 36 games and 60 strikeouts in 46.1 innings for the Gators, which tied the Gators single-season record for saves. He was named First Team All-American by the NCBWA, Second Team All-American by Collegiate Baseball, the American Baseball Coaches Association (ABCA)/Rawlings, and Perfect Game/Rawlings, Third Team All-American by D1baseball.com, and named to the ABCA All-South Region First Team and to the All-SEC First Team.

== Professional career ==
=== Boston Red Sox ===
The Boston Red Sox selected Anderson in the third round of the 2016 MLB draft, intending to use him as a starting pitcher, and he signed for a signing bonus of $700,000. The Red Sox assigned him to the Lowell Spinners of the Low–A New York-Penn League. Anderson pitched only 2 2/3 innings in 2016, giving up nine runs. He began the 2017 season with the Greenville Drive of the Single–A South Atlantic League. The Red Sox promoted Anderson to the Salem Red Sox of the High–A Carolina League in May.

=== San Francisco Giants ===
On July 25, 2017, the Red Sox traded Anderson and Gregory Santos to the San Francisco Giants in exchange for Eduardo Núñez. The Giants assigned him to the San Jose Giants of the High–A California League, where he finished the season. In 24 total games between Greenville, Salem-Keizer, and San Jose, with 23 of those being starts, Anderson posted a 9–6 record with a 3.44 ERA. Anderson began the 2018 season with the Richmond Flying Squirrels of the Double–A Eastern League. He was selected to represent the Giants at the 2018 All-Star Futures Game. In July, the Giants promoted him to the Sacramento River Cats of the Triple–A Pacific Coast League.

Anderson began the 2019 season with Sacramento, with whom he was 2-1 with a 3.76 ERA in 8 starts covering 38.1 innings in which he struck out 41 batters. The Giants promoted Anderson to make his major league debut on May 15 against the Toronto Blue Jays. His two hits in the game made him the first Giants pitcher since at least 1908 to have a multi-hit game with the bat in his first major league game. With the Giants in 2019 he was 3-5 with two saves and a 5.44 ERA in 28 games (16 starts) in which he pitched 96 innings.

In 2020, Anderson was used exclusively out of the bullpen, appearing in 18 games. He had 18 strikeouts in 15 1/3 innings.

=== Minnesota Twins ===
On February 4, 2021, the Giants traded Anderson to the Minnesota Twins in exchange for LaMonte Wade. In 8 2/3 innings over four appearances for Minnesota in 2021, Anderson pitched to a 9.35 ERA with eight strikeouts.

=== Texas Rangers ===
On June 18, 2021, Anderson was claimed on waivers by the Texas Rangers. He was then assigned to the Triple-A Round Rock Express, where he recorded 3.0 scoreless innings for the team. On June 29, Anderson was designated for assignment without having appeared in a game for the team.

=== Baltimore Orioles ===
On July 3, 2021, Anderson was claimed on waivers by the Baltimore Orioles and optioned to the Triple-A Norfolk Tides. On August 4, Anderson was designated for assignment by the Orioles.

=== San Diego Padres ===
On August 7, 2021, Anderson was claimed off of waivers by the San Diego Padres. He was assigned to the Triple-A El Paso Chihuahuas.

=== Toronto Blue Jays ===
On November 19, 2021, Anderson was claimed off waivers by the Toronto Blue Jays. On November 30, Anderson was outrighted off of the 40-man roster. He was assigned to the Triple-A Buffalo Bisons to begin the season.

On June 27, 2022, Anderson was selected to the active roster. He was designated for assignment on July 6. Anderson cleared waivers and was sent outright to Triple-A Buffalo on July 9. He elected free agency following the season on October 9.

=== Kia Tigers ===
On November 26, 2022, Anderson signed with the Kia Tigers of the KBO League. Anderson served as Kia's Opening Day starter in 2023. In 14 starts, he registered a 4–7 record and 3.76 ERA with 64 strikeouts in 79.0 innings pitched. On July 6, 2023, Anderson was released by the Tigers after the team re–signed Thomas Pannone.

=== Philadelphia Phillies ===
On July 20, 2023, Anderson signed a minor league contract with the Philadelphia Phillies organization. He made 11 starts for the Triple–A Lehigh Valley IronPigs, posting a 4–2 record and 4.85 ERA with 35 strikeouts across 52 innings. Anderson elected free agency following the season on November 6.

=== Olmecas de Tabasco ===
On February 23, 2024, Anderson signed with the Olmecas de Tabasco of the Mexican League. He made one start for Tabasco, tossing seven scoreless innings with four strikeouts. Anderson was released by the Olmecas on April 17.

=== Texas Rangers (second stint) ===
On April 18, 2024, Anderson signed a minor league contract with the Texas Rangers. On May 15, after four starts with the Triple–A Round Rock Express, Texas selected Anderson’s contract and promoted him to the active roster. In two games for Texas, he compiled a 5.40 ERA with three strikeouts across 3 1/3 innings pitched. Anderson was designated for assignment by the Rangers following the promotion of Gerson Garabito on May 26.

=== Miami Marlins ===
On May 30, 2024, the Rangers traded Anderson to the Miami Marlins in exchange for cash considerations. In 3 games for Miami, he struggled to a 10.97 ERA with 6 strikeouts across 10 2/3 innings pitched. On August 9, Anderson was designated for assignment by the Marlins. He cleared waivers and was sent outright to the Triple–A Jacksonville Jumbo Shrimp on August 11. On September 20, Miami added Anderson back to the major league roster. On November 1, Anderson was removed from the 40–man roster and sent outright to Jacksonville. He elected free agency on November 4.

=== Los Angeles Angels ===
On February 12, 2025, Anderson signed a minor league contract with the Los Angeles Angels. He began the year with the Triple-A Salt Lake Bees, posting a 5.06 ERA over seven starts. On May 9, the Angels selected Anderson's contract, adding him to their active roster. In five appearances for Los Angeles, he posted a 1-0 record and 6.30 ERA with 10 strikeouts over 10 innings of work. On May 24, Anderson was designated for assignment by the Angels. He elected free agency on May 26, and re-signed with Los Angeles on a new minor league contract with two days later. On June 9, the Angels added Anderson back to their active roster. He allowed two runs in 2/3 of an inning against the Athletics, and was designated for assignment by the Angels on June 13. Anderson elected free agency after clearing waivers the following day. On June 17, Anderson re-signed with the Angels on another minor league contract. On August 11, the Angels added Anderson back to their active roster. He allowed four runs in 2/3 of an inning against the Los Angeles Dodgers, and was designated for assignment the following day. Anderson cleared waivers and elected free agency on August 14. He re-signed with the organization on a new minor league contract the following day. Anderson elected free agency following the season on November 6.

On December 22, 2025, Anderson re-signed with the Angels on a minor league contract. On March 29, 2026, the Angels selected Anderson's contract, adding him to their active roster. He made nine appearances for Los Angeles, tallying a 1-0 record and 5.94 ERA with 12 strikeouts across 16 2/3 innings pitched. On April 26, Anderson was designated for assignment by the Angels. He elected free agency after clearing waivers on April 28. Anderson re-signed with the Angels on a minor league contract the following day. On June 3, Anderson had his contract selected from the minor leagues for a second time. He was designated for assignment by Los Angeles again on June 5. Anderson elected free agency after clearing waivers on June 7. The following day, he re-signed with Los Angeles on a minor league contract. Anderson had his contract selected to the major league roster for a third time on August 4. He was designated for assignment for a third time on August 29, and elected free agency after clearing waivers on September 2. On September 4, Anderson re–signed with Los Angeles on a new minor league contract. He elected free agency on November 2.
