= Dāvis =

Male given name

- Gender: Male
- Name day: 30 December

Origin
- Region of origin: Latvia

Other names
- Related names: Dāvids, David, Davis

Dāvis is a Latvian masculine given name and may refer to:

- Dāvis Bertāns (born 1992), Latvian basketball player
- Dāvis Čoders (born 1992), Latvian basketball player and coach
- Dāvis Mārtiņš Daugavietis (born 1996), Latvian politician
- Dāvis Ikaunieks (born 1994), Latvian footballer
- Dāvis Indrāns (born 1995), Latvian footballer
- Dāvis Spriņģis (born 1996), Latvian bobsledder
