= Dāvids (given name) =

Male given name

- Gender: Male
- Language: Latvian
- Name day: 30 December

Origin
- Region of origin: Latvia

Other names
- Related names: Dāvis

Dāvids is both a Latvian masculine given name. It is a cognate of the given name David.

Individuals named Dāvids include:

- Dāvids Beika (1885—1946), Latvian Marxist revolutionary, political activist, publicist and Soviet intelligence officer
- Dāvids Kalandija (born 1993), Latvian singer, judo, and MMA fighter
- Dāvids Sīmansons (1859—1933), Latvian Army officer
- Dāvids Vīksne (born 2000), Latvian basketball player
