= Judge Davis =

Judge Davis may refer to:

- Andre M. Davis (born 1949), judge of the United States Court of Appeals for the Fourth Circuit
- Arthur Marshall Davis (1907–1963), judge of the United States District Court for the District of Arizona
- Bancroft Davis (1822–1907), judge of the United States Court of Claims
- Brian J. Davis (born 1953), judge of the United States District Court for the Middle District of Florida
- Charles B. Davis (1877–1943), judge of the United States District Court for the Eastern District of Missouri
- David Jackson Davis (1878–1938), judge of the United States District Court for the Northern District of Alabama
- Edward B. Davis (1933–2010), judge of the United States District Court for the Southern District of Florida
- John Davis (U.S. district court judge) (1761–1847), judge of the United States District Court for the District of Massachusetts
- John Davis (United States Court of Claims judge) (1851–1902), judge of the United States Court of Claims
- John Morgan Davis (1906–1984), judge of the United States District Court for the Eastern District of Pennsylvania
- John Warren Davis (judge) (1867–1945), judge of the United States Court of Appeals for the Third Circuit
- Kathryn C. Davis (born 1978), judge of the United States Court of Federal Claims
- Legrome D. Davis (born 1952), judge of the United States District Court for the Eastern District of Pennsylvania
- Leonard Davis (judge) (born 1948), judge of the United States District Court for the Eastern District of Texas
- Mark Steven Davis (born 1962), judge of the United States District Court for the Eastern District of Virginia
- Michael J. Davis (born 1947), judge of the United States District Court for the District of Minnesota
- Oscar Hirsh Davis (1914–1988), judge of the United States Court of Appeals for the Federal Circuit
- Robert N. Davis (born 1953), judge of the United States Court of Appeals for Veterans Claims
- Stephanie D. Davis (born 1967), judge of the United States Court of Appeals for the Sixth Circuit
- Thomas Hoyt Davis (1892–1969), judge of the United States District Court for the Middle District of Georgia
- W. Eugene Davis (born 1936), judge of the United States Court of Appeals for the Fifth Circuit

== See also ==
- Justice Davis (disambiguation)
