= Davis Granados =

Colombian footballer (born 1981)

Personal information
- Full name: Deivis Davis Granados Fontalvo
- Date of birth: 16 May 1981 (age 45)
- Place of birth: Colombia
- Height: 1.80 m (5 ft 11 in)
- Position: Defender

Team information
- Current team: Atlético Chiriquí
- Number: 18

Senior career*
Years	Team	Apps	(Gls)
2003–2004	CD Johann	60	(1)
2005–2008	Barranquilla	92	(4)
2008	San Francisco	14	(0)
2009–	Atlético Chiriquí	45	(1)
- * Club domestic league appearances and goals as of 02:39, 20 March 2009 (UTC) ‡ National team caps and goals as of 29 October 2008

Davis Granados (Deivis Granados) (born 16 May 1981 in Colombia) is a Colombian football defender.

== Career ==
He currently plays for Atlético Chiriquí in the ANAPROF.

Granados played for San Francisco FC in the group stages of the CONCACAF Champions League 2008–09.
