= Walter Pennington =

American baseball player (born 1998)

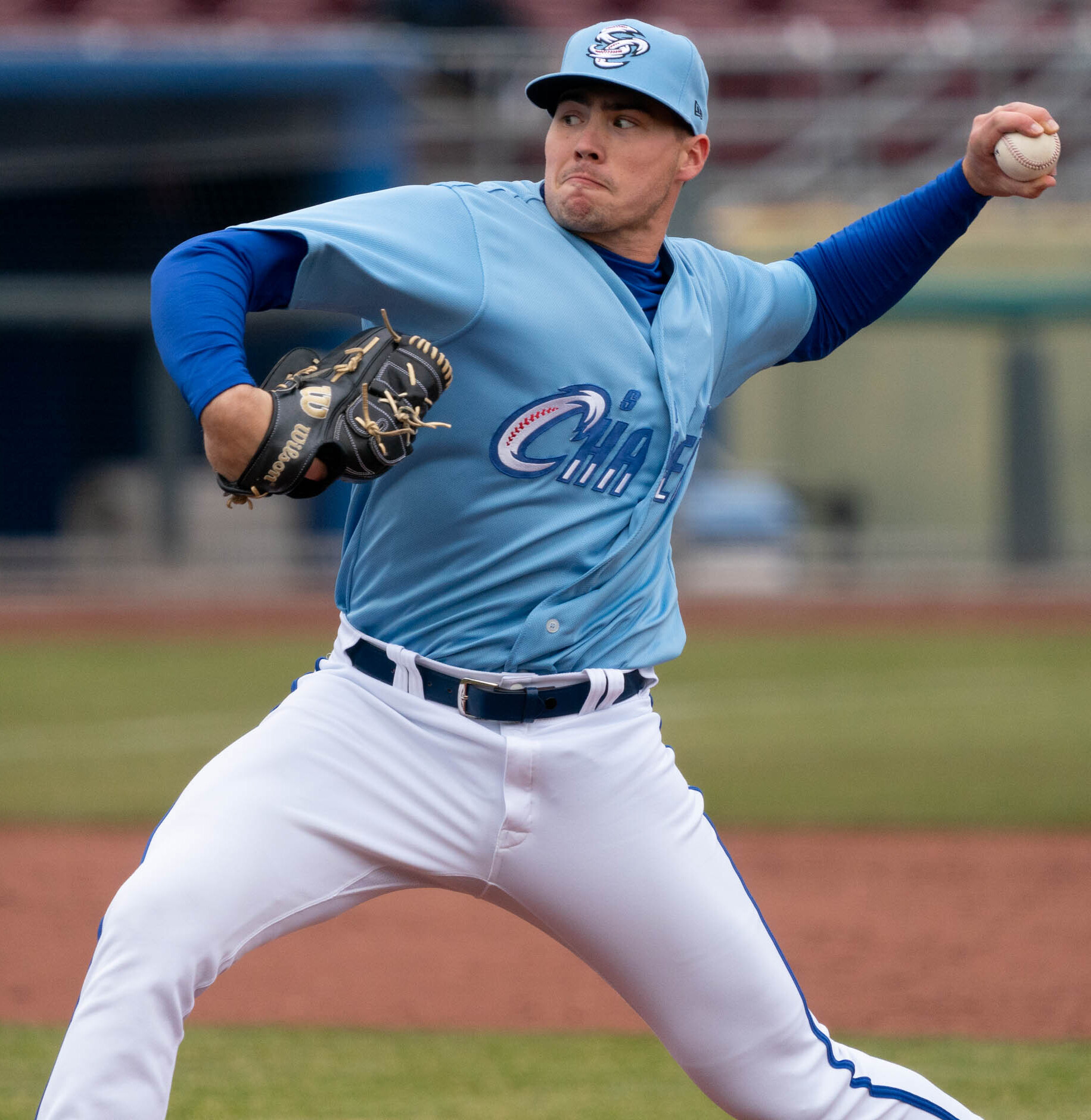
- Pennington with the Omaha Storm Chasers in 2024

Free agent
- Pitcher
- Born: April 14, 1998 (age 28); Broomfield, Colorado, U.S.
- Bats: Left Throws: Left

MLB debut
- July 5, 2024, for the Kansas City Royals

MLB statistics (through 2024 season)
- Win–loss record: 1–0
- Earned run average: 3.00
- Strikeouts: 17
- Stats at Baseball Reference

Teams
- Kansas City Royals (2024); Texas Rangers (2024)

Walter Carlton Pennington (born April 14, 1998) is an American professional baseball pitcher who is a free agent. He has previously played in Major League Baseball (MLB) for the Kansas City Royals and Texas Rangers.

== Career ==
=== Kansas City Royals ===
After going unselected in the 2020 MLB draft, Pennington signed a minor league contract with the Kansas City Royals on August 24, 2020. He did not appear for the organization in 2020 due to the cancellation of the minor league season because of the COVID-19 pandemic. Pennington split his first professional season between the rookie–level Arizona Complex League Royals and Single–A Columbia Fireflies. In 25 games for the two affiliates, he accumulated a 3.32 ERA with 40 strikeouts and 4 saves across 43 1/3 innings pitched.

Pennington split the 2022 campaign between the High–A Quad Cities River Bandits and Double–A Northwest Arkansas Naturals, compiling a 5.19 ERA with 61 strikeouts and 3 saves across 36 appearances. He spent the majority of the 2023 season with the Triple–A Omaha Storm Chasers, having received a promotion following eight scoreless appearances for Northwest Arkansas. In 41 games for Omaha, Pennington logged a 7–2 record and 3.69 ERA with 64 strikeouts across 61 innings.

Pennington began 2024 back in Omaha, where he posted a 2.35 ERA with 76 strikeouts across 32 outings. On July 5, 2024, Pennington was selected to the 40-man roster and promoted to the major leagues for the first time. In his MLB debut, he tossed 2/3 of a scoreless inning against the Colorado Rockies.

=== Texas Rangers ===
On July 29, 2024, the Royals traded Pennington to the Texas Rangers in exchange for Michael Lorenzen, with Pennington being optioned to the Rangers’ Triple-A affiliate, the Round Rock Express, after the trade. In 15 appearances for Texas, he posted a 1-0 record and 3.12 ERA with 16 strikeouts across 17 1/3 innings pitched.

Pennington was optioned to Triple-A Round Rock to begin the 2025 season. He was designated for assignment by Texas on April 23, 2025.

=== Baltimore Orioles ===
On April 28, 2025, Pennington was claimed off waivers by the Baltimore Orioles. He made one appearance each for the Triple-A Norfolk Tides and High-A Aberdeen IronBirds, struggling to a cumulative 0-2 record and 45.00 ERA with no strikeouts over one inning pitched. Pennington was designated for assignment following the acquisition of Luis Castillo on May 7. He cleared waivers and was sent outright to Norfolk on May 9. Pennington made 18 total appearances on the year (split between Aberdeen, the Double-A Chesapeake Baysox, and Norfolk), compiling an 0-3 record and 4.15 ERA with 27 strikeouts across 21 2/3 innings pitched. He was released by the Orioles organization on January 28, 2026.
