= Davis Kopi =

Motswana footballer

Personal information
- Full name: Davis Kopi
- Date of birth: 1 December 1971 (age 54)
- Place of birth: Botswana
- Position: Defender

Senior career*
| Years | Team | Apps | (Gls) |
| 2000–2007 | TAFIC | | |

International career
| 2000 | Botswana | 2 | (0) |
- * Club domestic league appearances and goals

Davis Kopi (born 1 December 1971) is a Motswana former footballer who played as a defender. He won two caps for the Botswana national football team in 2000.
