= Davis Building =

Davis Building may refer to:

== Canada ==
- William G. Davis Building, University of Toronto Mississauga

== United States ==
- Davis Building (Los Angeles, California)
- Davis Building (Dallas, Texas)
