= Justice Davis =

Justice Davis may refer to:

- Alton Davis (born c. 1946-47), associate justice of the Michigan Supreme Court
- Charles Davis (Vermont judge) (1789–1863), associate justice of the Vermont Supreme Court
- Charles H. Davis (judge) (1906–1976), chief justice of the Illinois Supreme Court
- David Davis (Supreme Court justice) (1815–1886), associate justice of the United States Supreme Court
- Fred Henry Davis (1894–1937), associate justice of the Florida Supreme Court
- Henry Hague Davis (1885–1944), puisne justice of the Supreme Court of Canada
- Horace S. Davis (1892–1967), associate justice of the Montana Supreme Court
- Joseph J. Davis (1828–1892), associate justice of the North Carolina Supreme Court
- Michael K. Davis (born 1952), associate justice of the Wyoming Supreme Court
- Noah Davis (judge) (1818–1902), justice of the New York Supreme Court, and ex officio a judge of the New York Court of Appeals
- Robert E. Davis (judge) (1939–2010), associate justice of the Kansas Supreme Court
- Robert Grimes Davis (1819–1872), the Second associate justice of the Supreme Court of Hawaii, under the Kingdom of Hawaii
- Robin Davis (born 1956), associate justice of the Supreme Court of Appeals of West Virginia
- Stephen B. Davis Jr. (c. 1873–1933), associate justice of the New Mexico Supreme Court
- William Z. Davis (1839–1923), associate justice of the Ohio Supreme Court
- Woodbury Davis (1818–1871), associate justice of the Maine Supreme Judicial Court

== See also ==
- Judge Davis (disambiguation)
