= Davis Township =

Davis Township may refer to:

== Arkansas ==
- Davis Township, Grant County, Arkansas, in Grant County, Arkansas
- Davis Township, Van Buren County, Arkansas, in Van Buren County, Arkansas

== Indiana ==
- Davis Township, Fountain County, Indiana
- Davis Township, Starke County, Indiana

== Minnesota ==
- Davis Township, Minnesota

== Missouri ==
- Davis Township, Caldwell County, Missouri
- Davis Township, Henry County, Missouri
- Davis Township, Lafayette County, Missouri

== North Carolina ==
- Davis Township, Carteret County, North Carolina, in Carteret County, North Carolina
