= Marc Church =

American baseball player (born 2001)

Free agent
- Pitcher
- Born: March 30, 2001 (age 25); Atlanta, Georgia, U.S.
- Bats: Right Throws: Right

MLB debut
- September 28, 2024, for the Texas Rangers

MLB statistics (through 2025 season)
- Win–loss record: 0–0
- Earned run average: 3.18
- Strikeouts: 6
- Stats at Baseball Reference

Teams
- Texas Rangers (2024–2025)

Marc Easton Church (born March 30, 2001) is an American professional baseball pitcher who is a free agent. He made his MLB debut in 2024.

== Amateur career ==
Church attended North Atlanta High School in Atlanta, Georgia. He spent most of his life as an infielder, committing to North Carolina A&T State University as such after his junior season. Church converted to pitching and reached 93 MPH on his fastball as a senior.

== Professional career ==
The Texas Rangers selected Church in the 18th round, with the 535th overall selection, of the 2019 Major League Baseball draft. Church signed with Texas for an over-slot $300,000 signing bonus. After signing, Church did not appear in an official game with a Rangers' affiliate in the 2019 season. Instead, he took part in a new program put in place by Texas for their newly drafted high school pitchers. The "de-load" program as the organization called it, emphasized building a foundation mentally and physically while resting the pitchers' bodies from a strenuous senior season and pre-draft showcase circuit. The players were put through a strength program and classroom work until the post-season fall instructional training started. He did not play in a game 2020 due to the cancellation of the minor league season because of the COVID-19 pandemic.

Church made his professional debut and spent the 2021 season with the Down East Wood Ducks of the Low-A East, going 3–1 with a 4.28 ERA and 49 strikeouts over 27 1/3 innings. He missed the second half of that season with elbow inflammation that did not require surgery. Church opened the 2022 season with the Hickory Crawdads of the High-A South Atlantic League, going 2–2 with a 2.91 ERA and 57 strikeouts over 34 innings. He was promoted to the Frisco RoughRiders of the Double-A Texas League on June 29, and struggled to a 1–3 record with a 7.20 ERA and 21 strikeouts over 15 innings.

The Rangers invited Church to major league spring training as a non-roster player in 2023. Church returned to Frisco to open the 2023 season. He was promoted to the Round Rock Express of the Triple-A Pacific Coast League on May 23, after posting a 4.00 ERA with 31 strikeouts over 18 innings for Frisco. Over 44 innings for Round Rock, Church posted a 7–1 record with a 3.48 ERA and 48 strikeouts. On November 14, 2023, Texas added Church to their 40-man roster to protect him from the Rule 5 draft.

Church was optioned to Triple–A Round Rock to begin the 2024 season. Church missed nearly 4 months of the season on the injured list with a right shoulder strain. In 17 games for the Express, he compiled a 3.22 ERA with 24 strikeouts across 22 1/3 innings pitched. On September 27, 2024, Church was promoted to the major leagues for the first time.

Church made five appearances for the Rangers during the 2025 campaign, recording a 3.86 ERA with five strikeouts across 4 2/3 innings pitched.

Church was optioned to Triple-A Round Rock to begin the 2026 season. After struggling to a 7.71 ERA across five appearances, Church was designated for assignment by the Rangers on April 15, 2026. He cleared waivers and was sent outright to Round Rock on April 22. He elected free agency on November 2.
