= Davis Township, Lafayette County, Missouri =

Inactive township in the American state of Missouri

Coordinates: 39.0472°N 93.6467°W

Davis Township is an inactive township in Lafayette County, in the U.S. state of Missouri.

Davis Township was established in 1830, and most likely was named after Davis Creek.
