= Michael Lorenzen =

American baseball player (born 1992)

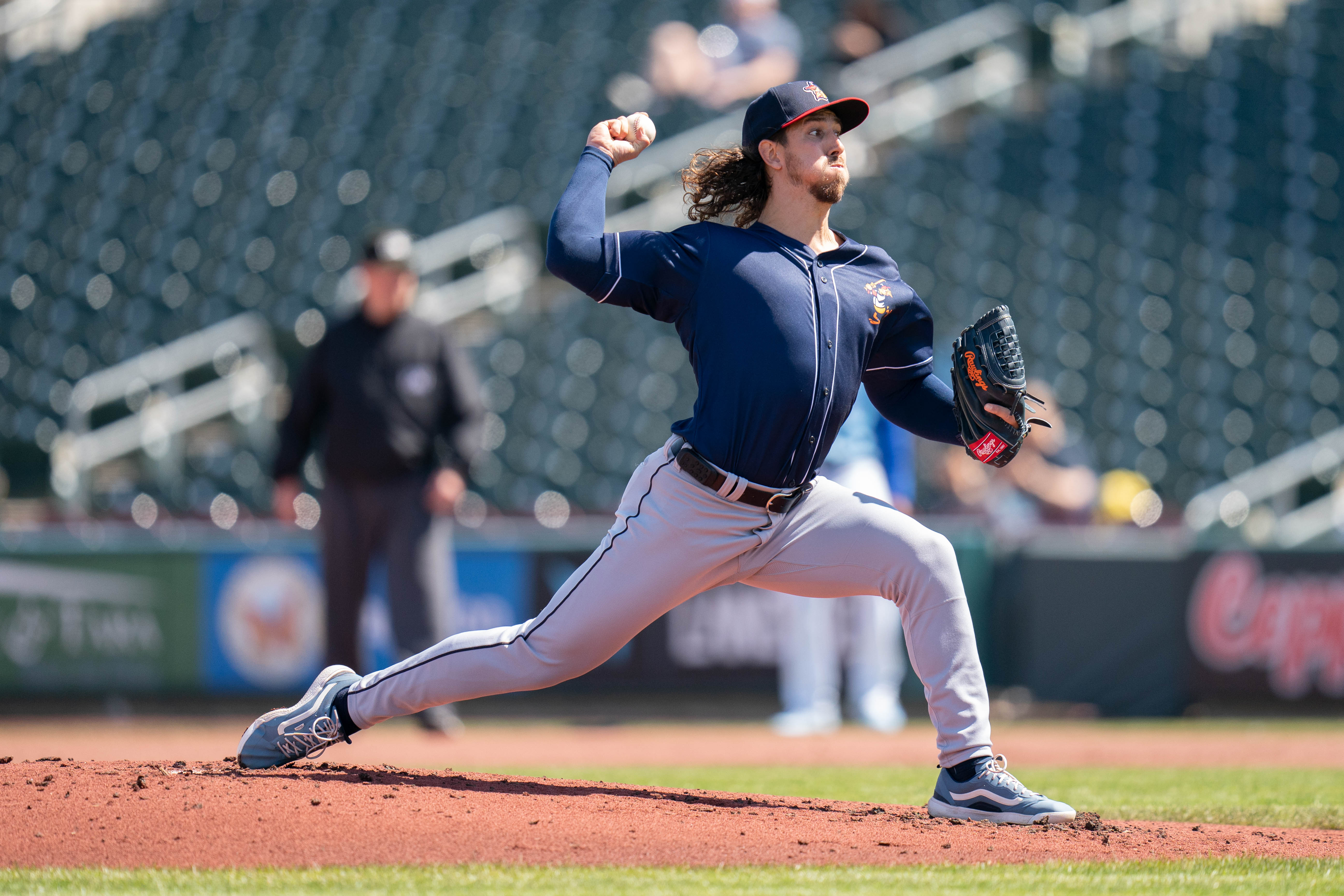
- Lorenzen on a rehab start in 2023

Free agent
- Pitcher
- Born: January 4, 1992 (age 34); Anaheim, California, U.S.
- Bats: Right Throws: Right

MLB debut
- April 29, 2015, for the Cincinnati Reds

MLB statistics (through 2026 season)
- Win–loss record: 57–68
- Earned run average: 4.44
- Strikeouts: 916
- Stats at Baseball Reference

Teams
- Cincinnati Reds (2015–2021); Los Angeles Angels (2022); Detroit Tigers (2023); Philadelphia Phillies (2023); Texas Rangers (2024); Kansas City Royals (2024–2025); Colorado Rockies (2026); Toronto Blue Jays (2026)

Career highlights and awards
- All-Star (2023); Pitched a no-hitter on August 9, 2023
Medals
Men's baseball
Representing the United States
Haarlem Baseball Week
Bronze medal – third place	2012	Team

Michael Clifton Lorenzen (born January 4, 1992) is an American professional baseball pitcher who is a free agent. He has previously played in Major League Baseball (MLB) for the Cincinnati Reds, Los Angeles Angels, Detroit Tigers, Philadelphia Phillies, Texas Rangers, Kansas City Royals, Colorado Rockies, and Toronto Blue Jays.

In college baseball, Lorenzen was a pitcher and outfielder for the Cal State Fullerton Titans. The Reds selected Lorenzen in the first round of the 2013 MLB draft, and he made his MLB debut with the Reds in 2015. Lorenzen signed with the Los Angeles Angels for the 2022 season and with the Tigers before the 2023 season. He was named an MLB All-Star in 2023.

The Tigers traded Lorenzen to the Phillies prior to 2023 season trade deadline, where he threw a no-hitter. He signed with the Rangers for the 2024 season.

== Education and amateur career ==
Lorenzen attended Fullerton Union High School in Fullerton, California, where he played for the school's baseball team. He had a batting average above .400 as a freshman. The Tampa Bay Rays selected Lorenzen in the seventh round of the 2010 Major League Baseball draft. Lorenzen opted not to sign, and instead enrolled at California State University, Fullerton, to play baseball for the Titans. In 2012, he was named an All-American and a finalist for the John Olerud Award. Lorenzen has also played on the United States national collegiate baseball team. In 2012, he played collegiate summer baseball with the Brewster Whitecaps of the Cape Cod Baseball League.

== Professional career ==
=== Cincinnati Reds ===
Lorenzen was considered to be among the best prospects eligible for the 2013 Major League Baseball draft, and was ranked as the #52 prospect by Baseball America. He was selected with the 38th pick by the Cincinnati Reds. He signed and made his professional debut with the Arizona League Reds. He also pitched for the Dayton Dragons, Bakersfield Blaze, and the Pensacola Blue Wahoos during the season. In 21 innings pitched between the four clubs, he was 1–1 with a 3.00 earned run average (ERA).

The Reds invited Lorenzen to spring training as a non-roster invitee in 2014. He pitched for Pensacola in 2014, started 24 games, and pitched to a 4–6 win–loss record and a 3.13 ERA in 120 2/3 innings pitched. He tried out for the Reds in spring training in 2015 as a relief pitcher but was reassigned to the minor leagues before the start of the season. He started the 2015 season with the Louisville Bats.

The Reds promoted Lorenzen to the major leagues to start on April 29, 2015. He made his major league debut that day, pitching five innings against the Milwaukee Brewers. He gave up eight hits, including three home runs, walked one and struck out five, and was credited with the 8–3 loss. He stayed with Cincinnati before being optioned to Louisville on August 14. He was recalled by the Reds on August 31. In 27 games (21 starts) for the Reds, he was 4–9 with a 5.40 ERA, and in six starts for Louisville, he was 4–2 with a 1.88 ERA.

During spring training in 2016, he was diagnosed with a sprained ulnar collateral ligament in his right elbow, and he did not return until mid-June. He pitched out of the bullpen for Cincinnati upon his return, and he finished the year with a 2–1 record and a 2.88 ERA in 35 relief appearances. In 2017, he was 8–4 with a 4.45 ERA in 70 appearances in relief.

Lorenzen was called up to pinch-hit in the seventh inning of a June 30, 2018, game against the Brewers and hit a grand slam off pitcher Jacob Barnes. It was Lorenzen's third home run of the 2018 season.

During the 2018–2019 offseason, Lorenzen worked extensively as an outfielder and stated he had eagerness and desire for the transition to a two-way player. On September 4, 2019, Lorenzen became the second player in baseball history to hit a home run, earn the win as the pitcher, and play in the field in the same game when the Reds defeated the Phillies, 8–5. The other player to achieve the feat was Babe Ruth on June 13, 1921. In 2020 for the Reds, Lorenzen pitched in 18 games, registering a 3–1 record and a 4.28 ERA with 35 strikeouts in 33 2/3 innings of work.

On April 14, 2021, Lorenzen was placed on the 60-day injured list with a shoulder strain. On July 17, 2021, Lorenzen was activated off of the injured list.

=== Los Angeles Angels ===
On November 30, 2021, Lorenzen signed a one-year contract with the Los Angeles Angels worth $6.75 million. Lorenzen sought to sign with a team that would allow him to start games and picked the Angels out of several offering teams because of his childhood in the Anaheim area. He made his Angels debut on April 11, 2022, starting the game and pitching 6 innings with 2 hits and 1 earned run allowed while striking out 7 against the Miami Marlins. On May 1, 2022, Lorenzen made his longest career start against the Chicago White Sox, giving up 3 runs in 8 1/3 innings of work. On July 7, the Angels placed Lorenzen on the 15-day injured list due to a strain in his right shoulder. An MRI found that there was no structural damage from the injury. He was later transferred to the 60-day injured list and was activated on September 9. In 18 starts, Lorenzen finished the season with an 8–6 record, posting a 4.24 ERA with 85 strikeouts.

=== Detroit Tigers ===
On December 20, 2022, Lorenzen signed a one-year contract with the Detroit Tigers worth $8.5 million. Lorenzen started the season on the injured list with a left groin strain. He was activated off the injured list on April 15, 2023, to make his Tigers debut starting against the San Francisco Giants. Lorenzen represented the Tigers at the 2023 MLB All-Star Game. He posted a 3.58 ERA in 18 starts for Detroit.

=== Philadelphia Phillies ===
On August 1, 2023, Lorenzen was traded to the Philadelphia Phillies for prospect Hao-Yu Lee. On August 9, in his first home start in Philadelphia, with his mother, wife, and daughter in attendance, Lorenzen threw a no-hitter in a 7–0 win over the Washington Nationals. The no-hitter was the 14th in Phillies franchise history, and the first since Cole Hamels in 2015. Lorenzen struggled after the no-hitter, posting a 5.51 ERA in 11 games for Philadelphia. He pitched twice in relief in the playoffs, allowing no runs but 4 baserunners in 2 2/3 innings. He became a free agent following the season.

=== Texas Rangers ===
On March 22, 2024, Lorenzen signed a one-year, $4.5 million contract with the Texas Rangers. He waited until March to sign, hoping for a multi-year contract. In 19 games (18 starts) for the Rangers, Lorenzen had a 5–6 record, 3.81 ERA, and 75 strikeouts across 101 2/3 innings pitched.

=== Kansas City Royals ===
On July 29, 2024, Lorenzen was traded to the Kansas City Royals for Walter Pennington. In 7 games (6 starts) for the Royals, he posted a 2–0 record and 1.57 ERA with 22 strikeouts across 28 2/3 innings pitched. He took the loss in Game 1 of the American League Division Series, allowing one run and one inherited runner to score. He pitched one more scoreless inning as the Royals lost to the New York Yankees.

On January 8, 2025, Lorenzen re-signed with the Royals on a one-year, $7 million contract. Before signing, he had considered once again attempting to become a two-way player, in part to circumvent an MLB rule limiting the number of pitchers allowed on an MLB active roster. Lorenzen made 27 appearances (26 starts) for Kansas City, compiling a 7–11 record and 4.64 ERA with 127 strikeouts across 141 2/3 innings pitched.

=== Colorado Rockies ===
On January 15, 2026, Lorenzen signed a one-year, $8 million contract with the Colorado Rockies that included a $9 million club option for the 2027 season. He made 26 appearances (including 25 starts) for Colorado, but struggled to a 3–11 record and 7.08 ERA with 82 strikeouts across 115 2/3 innings pitched. Lorenzen was designated for assignment by the Rockies on August 17. On August 19, the Rockies released Lorenzen.

=== Toronto Blue Jays ===
On August 27, 2026, Lorenzen signed a major league contract with the Toronto Blue Jays. In six appearances out of the bullpen, he recorded a 8.49 ERA with eight strikeouts across 11 2/3 innings pitched. On September 18, Lorenzen was designated for assignment by the Blue Jays. Lorenzen elected free agency on September 21. In 2026, Lorenzen made 32 appearances (25 starts) with a 3–13 record and a 7.21 ERA. He led MLB with 113 runs allowed with 102 of them being earned, also leading MLB.

== Personal life ==
Lorenzen has three older brothers: Jonathan, Matthew, and Anthony. Jonathan played two seasons in the Los Angeles Dodgers organization, and Matthew played college baseball at Cypress and Fullerton Colleges.

Both of Lorenzen's parents struggled with drugs and alcohol and frequently fought, with Lorenzen stating that police would show up at his house "almost every single weekend." Lorenzen began experimenting with drugs and alcohol in eighth grade, but stopped when he was 17 after a man read him the Gospel. He is now a devout Christian. He has Bible verses and references tattooed on both arms.

Lorenzen's father died in August 2016. In his first game back from the bereavement list on August 19, 2016, he hit his first career home run and dedicated it to his father.

Lorenzen and his wife, Cassi, married in November 2016. They have a daughter, named June, born in 2023.

Lorenzen, who grew up skateboarding, is known for wearing customized Vans skate shoes rather than standard baseball cleats. When Lorenzen pitched a no-hitter in 2023, his Vans were sent to the Baseball Hall of Fame.

== See also ==
- 2013 College Baseball All-America Team
- List of Major League Baseball no-hitters

Awards and achievements
Preceded by Framber Valdez	No-hitter pitcher August 9, 2023	Succeeded by Ronel Blanco
