= Daniel Robert (baseball) =

American baseball player (born 1994)

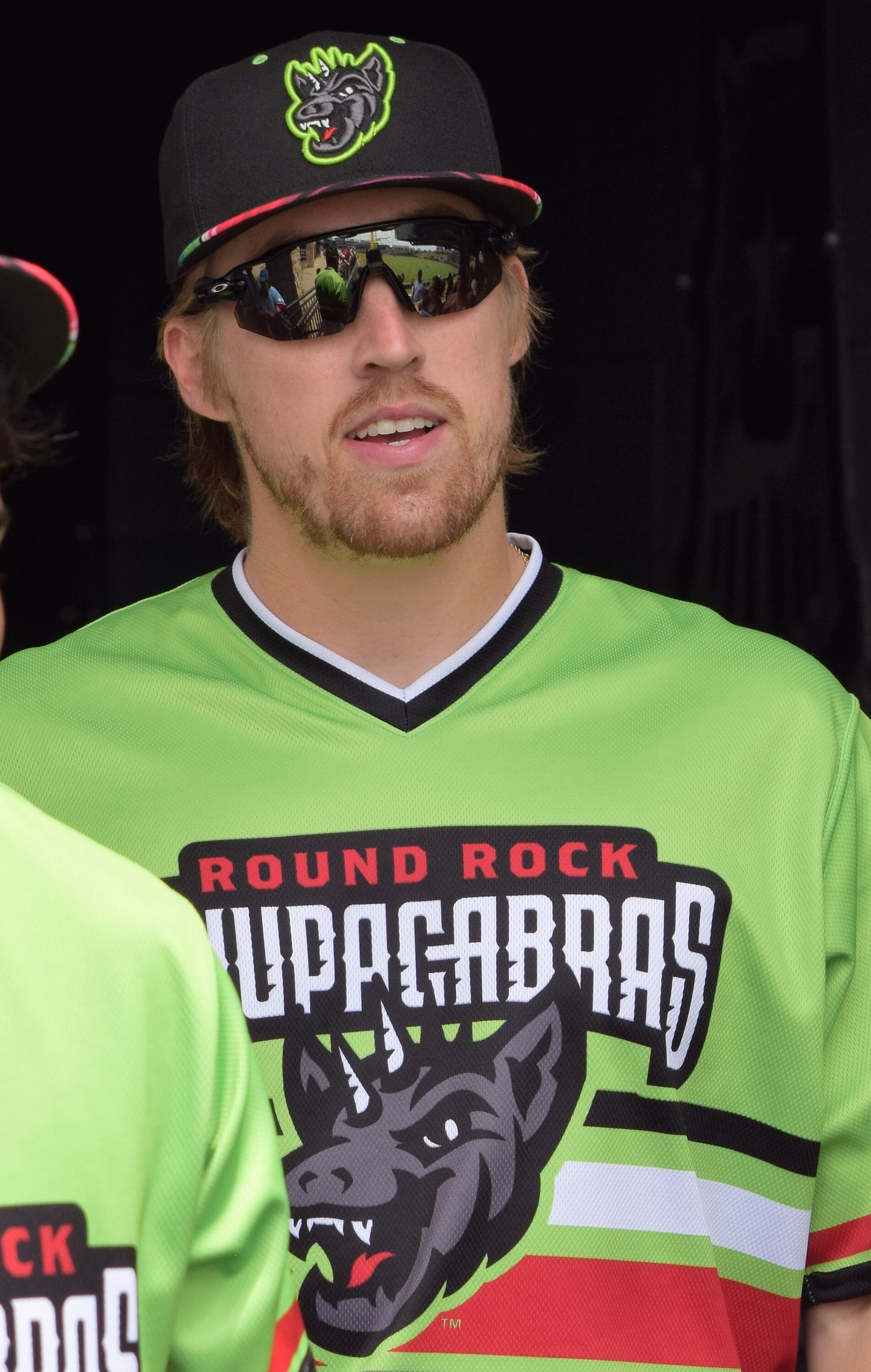
- Robert with the Round Rock Express in 2022

Free agent
- Pitcher
- Born: August 30, 1994 (age 32); Hoover, Alabama, U.S.
- Bats: Left Throws: Right

MLB debut
- July 10, 2024, for the Texas Rangers

MLB statistics (through 2025 season)
- Win–loss record: 1–0
- Earned run average: 3.86
- Strikeouts: 21
- Stats at Baseball Reference

Teams
- Texas Rangers (2024); Philadelphia Phillies (2025)

Daniel McGee Robert (born August 30, 1994) is an American professional baseball pitcher who is a free agent. He has previously played in Major League Baseball (MLB) for the Texas Rangers and Philadelphia Phillies.

== Amateur career ==
Robert attended Briarwood Christian School in Birmingham, Alabama. In his sophomore season of 2011, Robert hit .556 with 10 home runs and 48 RBIs and was named the 2011 Birmingham News Metro Baseball Player of the Year. Robert played receiver on the football team in high school. Undrafted out of high school in 2013, Robert attended Auburn University and played college baseball for the Auburn Tigers. At Auburn, Robert played mainly first base and outfield. He enjoyed his best season as a senior in 2017; hitting .290/.402/.429/.830 with 5 home runs and 45 RBI, while recording a 2.16 ERA over 6 appearances on the mound. Robert was drafted by the Texas Rangers in the 21st round of the 2017 MLB draft as a pitcher.

== Professional career ==
=== Texas Rangers ===
Robert agreed to sign with Texas for a $5,000 signing bonus, but during his physical an MRI revealed a torn UCL. Texas voided his contract and he underwent Tommy John surgery. After rehabbing for six months Robert attended an open tryout with Texas and was signed to a minor league contract in 2018. He spent the remainder of the season in rehabilitation. Robert split his professional debut season of 2019 between the Spokane Indians of the Low–A Northwest League and the Hickory Crawdads of the Single–A South Atlantic League, going 2–1 with a 0.99 ERA and 50 strikeouts over 36 1/3 innings. He did not play in a game in 2020 due to the cancellation of the minor league season because of the COVID-19 pandemic.

Robert split the 2021 season between the Arizona Complex League Rangers of the Rookie-level Arizona Complex League, Hickory, and the Frisco RoughRiders of the Double-A Central, going a combined 0–1 with a 2.78 ERA and 42 strikeouts over 22 2/3 innings. Robert spent the 2022 season with the Round Rock Express of the Triple-A Pacific Coast League and struggled to a 4–4 record with a 6.28 ERA over 38 2/3 innings. He followed the 2022 season by appearing in eight games for the Surprise Saguaros of the Arizona Fall League. Robert received a non-roster invitation to major league spring training in 2023 and returned to Round Rock for the season, going 1–2 with a 4.40 with 51 strikeouts over 43 innings.

Robert began the 2024 campaign with Round Rock, compiling a 2.35 ERA with 40 strikeouts and 5 saves across 25 appearances. On July 8, 2024, Robert was selected to the 40-man roster and promoted to the major leagues for the first time. In 4 appearances for the Rangers during his rookie campaign, he logged a 1–0 record and 3.18 ERA with 6 strikeouts across 5 2/3 innings pitched.

Robert was optioned to Triple-A Round Rock to begin the 2025 season. Robert was designated for assignment by the Rangers on April 28, 2025.

=== Philadelphia Phillies ===
On May 1, 2025, Robert was traded to the Philadelphia Phillies in exchange for Enrique Segura. In 15 appearances for Philadelphia, he recorded a 4.15 ERA with 15 strikeouts over 13 innings of work. On September 3, Robert was placed on the injured list due to a right forearm strain. He was transferred to the 60-day injured list on September 8, officially ending his season. On November 21, Robert was non-tendered by Philadelphia and became a free agent.

On February 3, 2026, Robert re-signed with the Phillies organization on a minor league contract. On April 3, he underwent a cardiac ablation procedure after suffering two cardiac events within a five-month span. On June 5, the Phillies announced that Robert would not play during the 2026 season. He elected free agency on November 2.

== Personal life ==
Daniel's father, Greg Robert, played football at Auburn University from 1968 to 1969 as an offensive lineman.

On October 31, 2025, Robert suffered a cardiac event during his final bullpen session of the year, and was saved through the use of CPR and a defibrillator; he subsequently had a implantable cardioverter-defibrillator implanted in his chest. On March 22, 2026, Robert suffered a second cardiac event during a spring training throwing session, and was released from the hospital shortly thereafter.
