= Davis Kamukama =

Ugandan politician

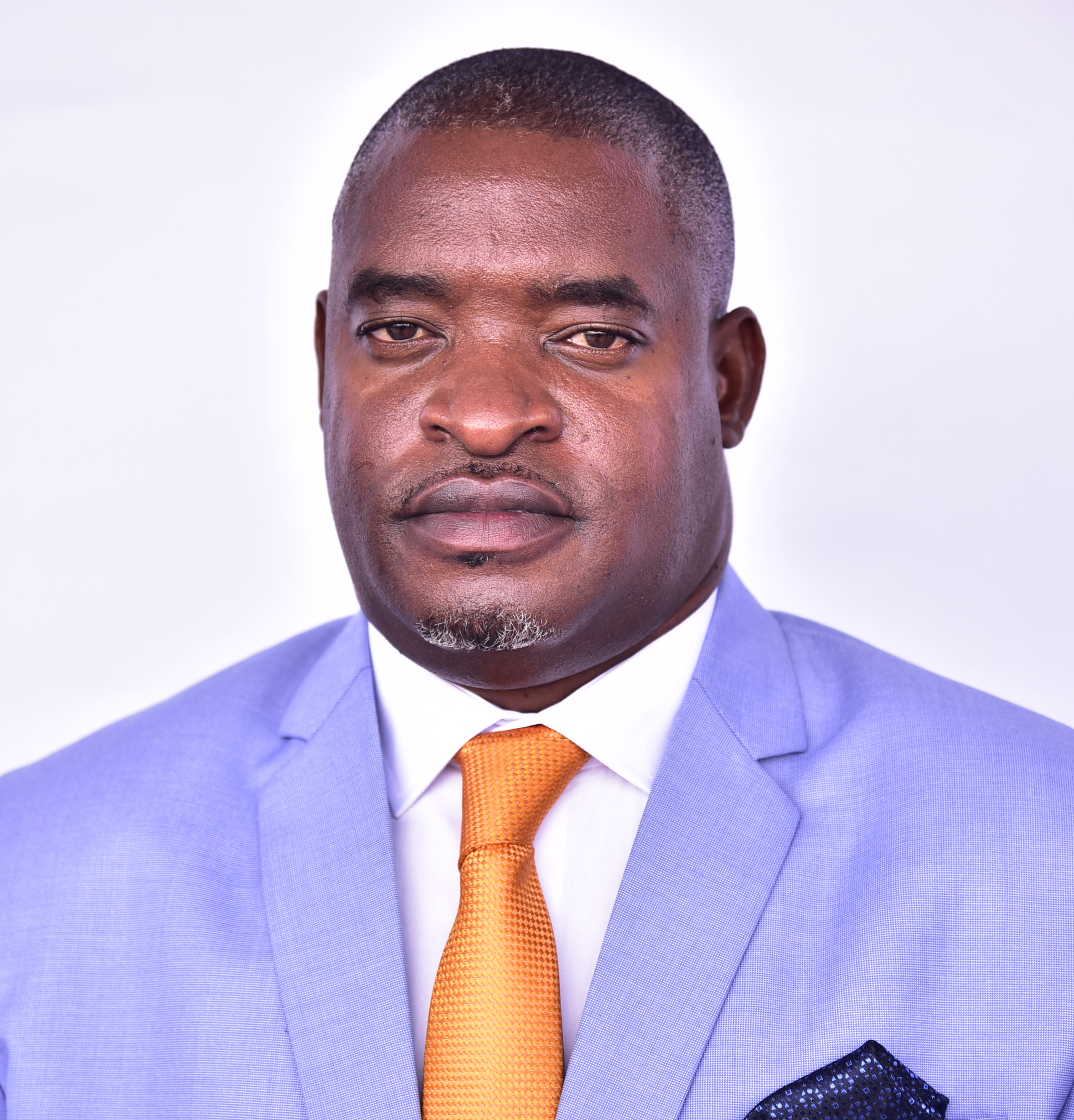
Kamukama Davis

Davis Kamukama is a Ugandan businessman, founder of Ngabo FM radio station and politician of the National Resistance Movement. He was elected to the Ugandan parliament in the 2021 general elections.

In the 11th parliament, he serves on the committee of Agriculture, Animal Industries & Fisheries.

== Political career ==
Kamukama picked the NRM ticket to run for the Bunyangabu County seat in the parliament after defeating incumbent Defense Minister and member of parliament, Adolf Mwesige Kasaija in the primary elections. Kamukama received 22,445 votes while Kasaija got 18,067 votes. Following his victory at the primary election, a petition was filed to the NRM secretariat against Kamukama over his academic qualifications but was cleared by the party authority and went ahead to win the general election to represent Bunyangabu County seat in the parliament.
