= Davis County =

Davis County is or was the name of the following counties in the United States:

- Davis County, Iowa, named in honor of Garrett Davis, a Congressman from Kentucky
- Davis County, Utah, named for Daniel C. Davis, captain in the Mormon Battalion
- Cass County, Texas, named Davis County from 1861 to 1871

Davis County may also refer to:

- Jeff Davis County, Texas
- Jeff Davis County, Georgia
- Jefferson Davis Parish, Louisiana
- Jefferson Davis County, Mississippi

== See also ==
- Daviess County, Kentucky, pronounced as "Davis"
