= Justin Foscue =

American baseball player (born 1999)

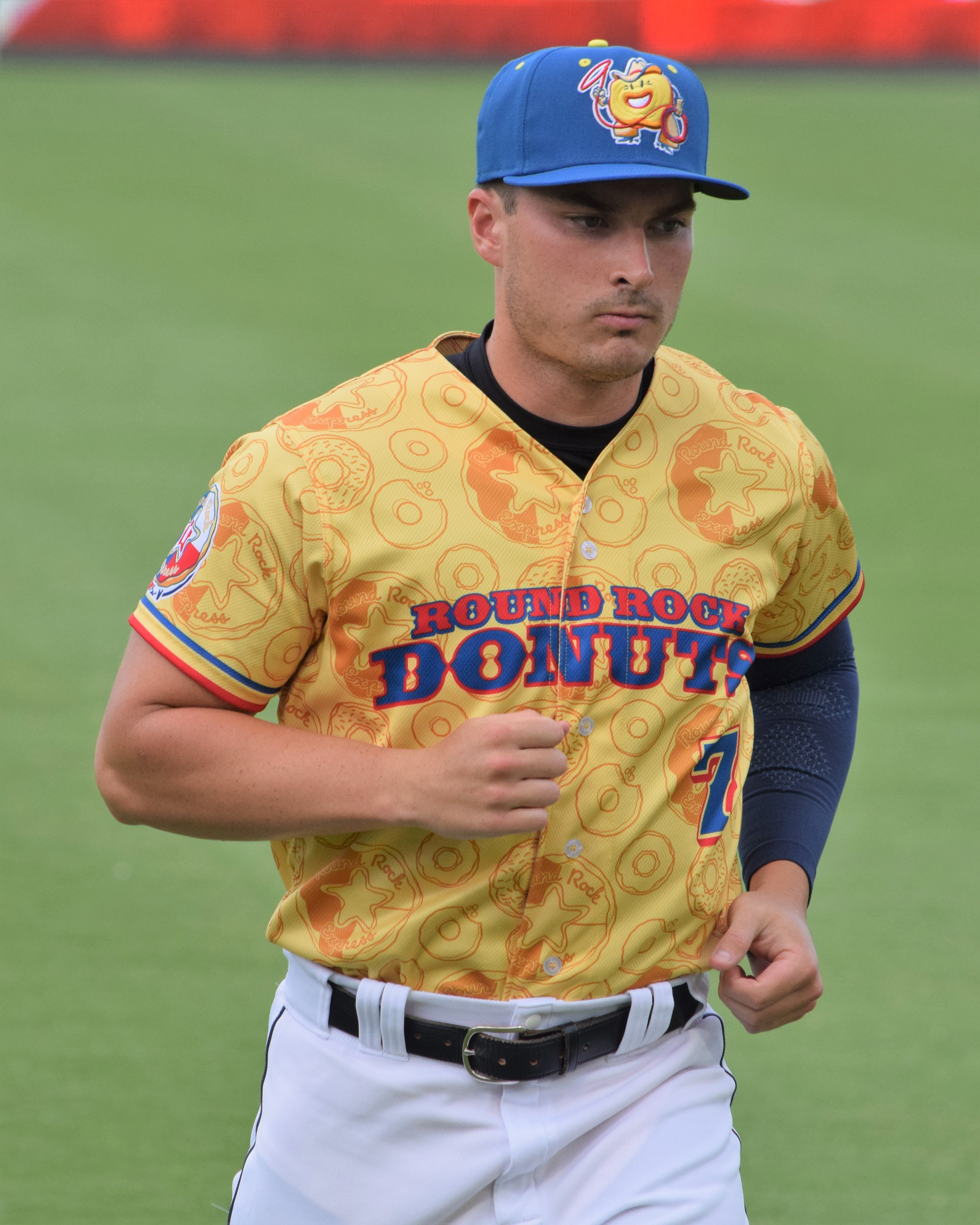
- Foscue with the Round Rock Express in 2023

Texas Rangers – No. 14
- Second baseman / First baseman
- Born: March 2, 1999 (age 27); Huntsville, Alabama, U.S.
- Bats: Right Throws: Right

MLB debut
- April 5, 2024, for the Texas Rangers

MLB statistics (through 2026 season)
- Batting average: .232
- Home runs: 11
- Runs batted in: 37
- Stats at Baseball Reference

Teams
- Texas Rangers (2024–present)

Justin Connor Foscue (born March 2, 1999) is an American professional baseball second baseman and first baseman for the Texas Rangers of Major League Baseball (MLB). He was selected 14th overall by the Rangers in the 2020 MLB draft. He made his MLB debut in 2024.

== Amateur career ==
Foscue attended Virgil I. Grissom High School in Huntsville, Alabama, where he played baseball. In 2017, his senior year, he hit .318 with six home runs, earning All-State honors. Undrafted in the 2017 Major League Baseball draft, he fulfilled his commitment to play college baseball at Mississippi State University.

In 2018, Foscue's freshman season for the Mississippi State Bulldogs, Foscue appeared in 58 games, batting .241 with three home runs and 20 runs batted in (RBIs). As a sophomore in 2019, he moved from third base to second base and slashed .331/.395/.564 with 14 home runs, sixty RBIs, and 22 doubles over 67 starts. He earned All-SEC First-Team honors. That summer, he played for the United States collegiate national team. In 2020, Foscue's junior year, he hit .302 with two home runs and 16 RBIs over 16 games before the college baseball season was cut short due to the COVID-19 pandemic.

== Professional career ==
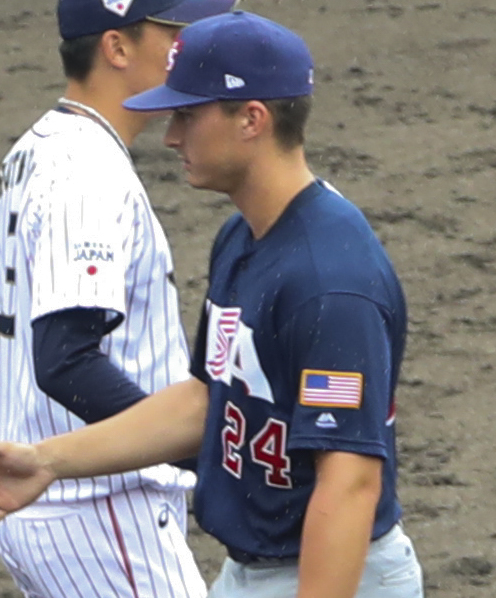
Foscue with the United States national collegiate baseball team in 2019

The Texas Rangers selected Foscue in the first round, with the 14th overall selection, of the 2020 Major League Baseball draft. He signed with the Rangers on June 19 for a $3.25 million signing bonus. He did not play in a game in 2020 due to the cancellation of the minor league season because of the COVID-19 pandemic.

To begin the 2021 season, Foscue was assigned to the Hickory Crawdads of the High-A East. He missed the whole month of June and the beginning of July after suffering a rib injury. He received a cortisone injection and rehabbed with the Arizona Complex League Rangers before returning to Hickory on July 10. From July 9 (his last rehab appearance) to July 23 (with Hickory), Foscue homered in eight consecutive games, tying the Major League Baseball record. In early August, he was promoted to the Frisco RoughRiders of the Double-A Central. Over 62 games for the 2021 season, Foscue slashed .275/.371/.590 with 17 home runs and 51 RBI, while playing second base. He played in the Arizona Fall League for the Surprise Saguaros after the season, hitting .257/.416/.529/.944 with five home runs and 14 RBIs. He opened the 2022 season with Frisco on the injured list with a back injury. Over 101 games with Frisco, he slashed .288/.367/.483 with 15 home runs, 81 RBI, and 31 doubles, while playing primarily second base.

Foscue spent the 2023 season with the Round Rock Express of the Triple-A Pacific Coast League, hitting .266/.394/.468 with 18 home runs, 14 stolen bases in 31 attempts, and 84 RBI. On November 14, 2023, Texas added Foscue to their 40-man roster to protect him from the Rule 5 draft.

Foscue was optioned to Triple–A Round Rock to begin the 2024 season. On April 2, 2024, Foscue was promoted to the major leagues for the first time. He made his debut on April 5, and collected his first hit on April 7. However, Foscue was placed on the injured list on April 8 with a left oblique strain. He was transferred to the 60–day injured list on April 13. Foscue was activated from the injured list on June 26 and stayed in the minors. Foscue got called up for the second time in his career on July 20. He played that day and recorded a hit and a run. In 15 appearances for the Rangers during his rookie campaign, Foscue went 2-for-42 (.048)/.091/.071 with one RBI, two walks, and 18 strikeouts. He was 0-for-39 in his last 39 at-bats of the season for Texas, the longest hitless streak to end a season by a non-pitcher in MLB since Tim Naehring was 0-for-39 for the Boston Red Sox in 1991.

Foscue was optioned to Triple-A Round Rock to begin the 2025 season. He was called up by Texas for the first time during the season on June 21. He started his 2025 major league season by continuing his MLB hitless streak, which he extended to 44 at bats, the longest such streak in Rangers history. Foscue made a total of nine at bats for the Rangers in 2025 and recorded one hit.

Foscue was again optioned to Triple-A Round Rock to begin the 2026 season. He was called up by Texas on May 5 and played the remainder of the season with the team. He hit his first major league home run against the Chicago Cubs at Globe Life Field on May 9. Foscue had a career day on May 18 at Coors Field against the Colorado Rockies, going 3-for-3 with a home run, two doubles, and three RBI. In total, he played in 100 games for the Rangers and ended the season with a .271 batting average, 11 home runs, and 34 RBI.
