= Josh Jung =

American baseball player (born 1998)

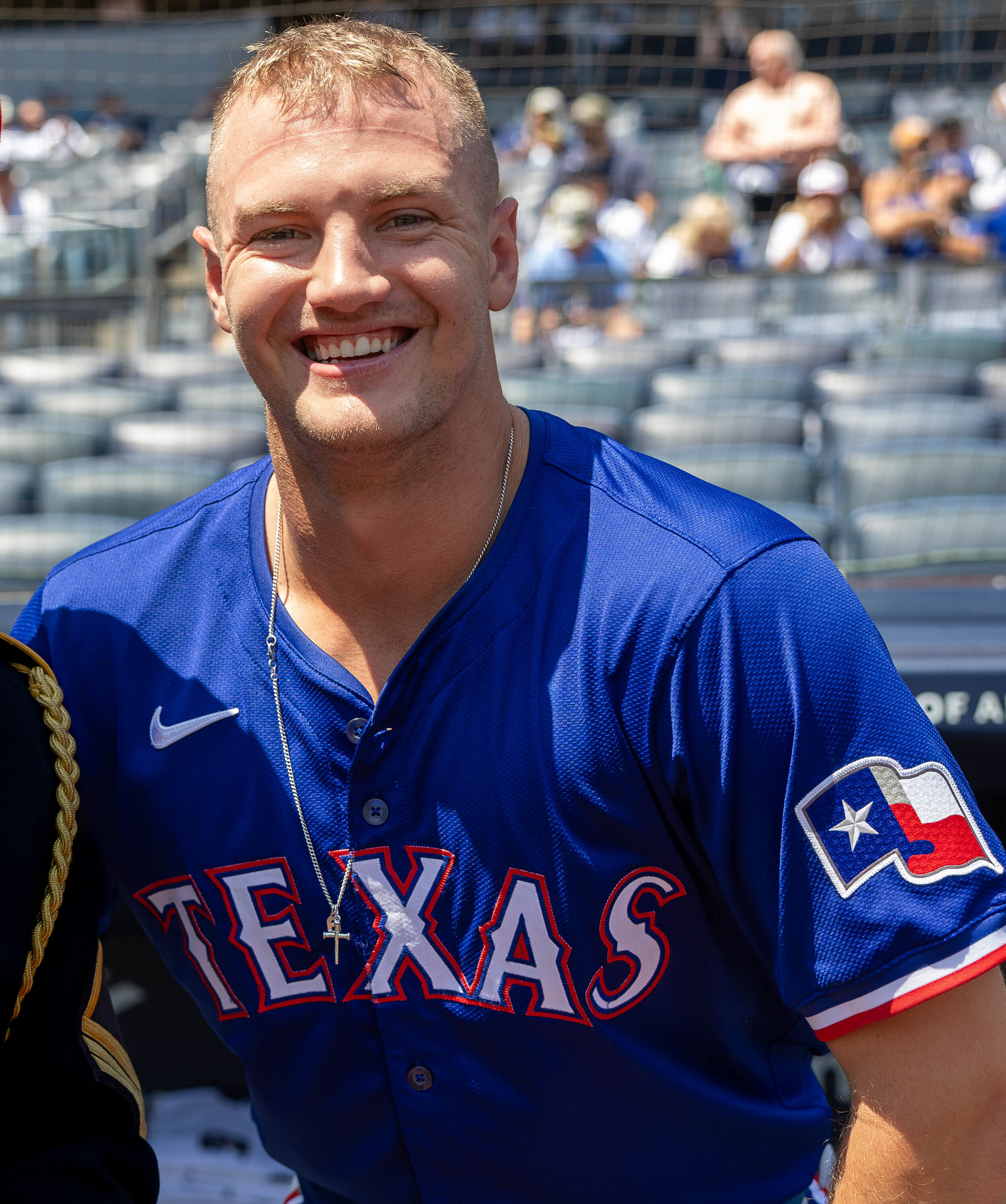
- Jung with the Rangers in 2024

Texas Rangers – No. 6
- Third baseman
- Born: February 12, 1998 (age 28); San Antonio, Texas, U.S.
- Bats: Right Throws: Right

MLB debut
- September 9, 2022, for the Texas Rangers

MLB statistics (through 2026 season)
- Batting average: .266
- Home runs: 61
- Runs batted in: 203
- Stats at Baseball Reference

Teams
- Texas Rangers (2022–present)

Career highlights and awards
- World Series champion (2023); All-Star (2023)

Joshua Ryne Jung (yung; born February 12, 1998) is an American professional baseball third baseman for the Texas Rangers of Major League Baseball (MLB). He played college baseball for the Texas Tech Red Raiders, and was drafted by the Rangers in the first round of the 2019 MLB draft.

== Amateur career ==
Born and raised in San Antonio, Texas, Jung attended Douglas MacArthur High School, where he played baseball and football. Undrafted out of high school in the 2016 MLB draft, he enrolled at Texas Tech University to play college baseball for the Red Raiders.

In 2017, as a freshman at Texas Tech, Jung started all 62 games at third base, batting .306 with six home runs and 43 RBIs. He was named the Big 12 Freshman of the Year and was named a Freshman All-American by multiple outlets including Collegiate Baseball and Perfect Game/Rawlings. He was also named to the All-Big 12 Freshman Team and the All-Big 12 Second Team. That summer, he played in the California Collegiate League where he hit .368 with two home runs, 31 RBIs, and a .454 on-base percentage over 117 at-bats. As a sophomore in 2018, Jung once again started all 65 of Texas Tech's games at third base, hitting .392/.491/.639 with 12 home runs and 80 RBIs. He was named to the All-Big 12 First Team, and was once again named an All-American by outlets such as Baseball America and Collegiate Baseball. He played for the USA Baseball Collegiate National Team that summer.

Jung was named a preseason All-American by Perfect Game, Baseball America, D1Baseball.com, and Collegiate Baseball prior to his junior year. During the season, he missed two games due to a quadricep strain, ending his streak of 139 consecutive starts. After returning, he moved to shortstop. He was named the 2019 Big 12 Co-Player of the Year (along with Baylor's Davis Wendzel) after batting .333 with nine home runs and 49 RBIs through 49 games. He was named an All-American by Baseball America, D1Baseball.com, Perfect Game, ABCA, and NCBWA. Jung was the recipient of the 2019 Bobby Bragan Collegiate Slugger Award, which honors the top Division I baseball player within Texas, Arkansas, Louisiana, New Mexico and Oklahoma each season. Jung finished his junior year hitting .343/.474/.636 with 15 home runs and 58 RBIs in 64 games.

Considered one of the top prospects for the 2019 MLB draft, he was selected by the Texas Rangers in the first round, with the eighth overall pick.

== Professional career ==
=== Minor leagues ===
On July 3, 2019, Jung signed with the Rangers for a $4.4 million signing bonus. On July 10, 2019, Jung made his professional debut with the Arizona League Rangers of the Rookie-level Arizona League, hitting a home run in his first professional at-bat. On July 15, Jung was promoted to the Hickory Crawdads of the Class A South Atlantic League and hit .287/.363/.389/.752 with one home run and 23 RBIs over forty games for them. Jung did not play a minor league game in 2020 due to the cancellation of the minor league season caused by the COVID-19 pandemic. On March 20, 2021, it was announced that Jung would undergo surgery to repair a stress fracture in his foot and miss six to eight weeks. He was activated on June 15 and assigned to the Frisco RoughRiders of the Double-A Central. After hitting .308/.366/.544 with ten home runs and forty RBIs over 43 games, he was promoted to the Round Rock Express of the Triple-A West in mid-August. Over 35 games with Round Rock, Jung hit .348/.436/.652 with nine home runs, 21 RBIs, and 14 doubles.

Jung entered the 2022 season as the ninth ranked overall prospect in baseball by FanGraphs, and the 26th overall prospect by Baseball America. On February 23, 2022, Jung underwent surgery to repair a torn labrum in his left shoulder. Jung returned to game action at the end of July, first appearing in eight rehab games for the Arizona Complex League Rangers, before returning to Round Rock in August. Over 23 games with Round Rock, he hit .273 with six home runs and 24 RBIs.

=== Texas Rangers ===
==== 2022 ====
On September 9, 2022, the Rangers selected Jung's contract from Triple-A and promoted him to the major leagues. He made his MLB debut that night and in his very first at-bat, he hit a home run off of Ross Stripling of the Toronto Blue Jays. The feat made him only the second Rangers player to do so alongside Jurickson Profar. Jung appeared in 26 games for Texas in 2022, hitting .204/.235/.418/.654 with five home runs and 14 RBI over 102 plate appearances.

==== 2023 ====
Jung was named the AL Rookie of the Month in April 2023 after leading AL rookies in hits (27), home runs (6), and total bases (44). His 21 runs batted in (RBI) were the most among all rookies. He followed that up by winning AL Rookie of the Month for May 2023. Jung was voted in as the American League starting third baseman for the 2023 Major League Baseball All-Star Game. Jung became the first rookie to start in an All-Star game as a Texas Ranger. He won the World Series with the Rangers in 2023.

==== 2024 ====
After playing in just four games, Jung suffered a fractured wrist following a hit by pitch, and was ruled out for 8–10 weeks after undergoing surgery. He was activated from the injured list on July 29, 2024. Jung finished the season with 46 games played, hitting .264/.298/.421/.719, tallying 7 home runs and 16 RBIs.

==== 2025 ====
Jung began the 2025 season on the Rangers roster, but was placed on the injured list with neck spasms on March 30. He was activated on April 8. Jung was optioned to Triple-A Round Rock on July 3, 2025, after hitting .237 with eight home runs across 75 games. He was recalled back to the majors on July 21. He played the remainder of the season with the Rangers and finished the 2025 season with a .251 batting average, 14 home runs, and 61 RBI across 131 games.

==== 2026 ====
In 2026, Jung missed close to two months with a calf strain. He then missed the Rangers' final series of the season after suffering a right hand fracture. Jung played a total of 104 games and batted .299 with 12 home runs and 42 RBI.

== Personal life ==
Jung is a Christian. His parents, Jeff and Mary Jung, are both teachers in the North East Independent School District. Jung's younger brother, Jace Jung, played college baseball at Texas Tech and was a first-round draft pick in 2022.
