= Devis =

Devis is a masculine given name and a surname. Bearers include:

== Given name ==
- Devis Epassy (born 1993), French football goalkeeper
- Devis Favaro (born 1972), Italian former hurdler
- Devis Mangia (born 1974), Italian football manager
- Devis Mema (born 1985), Albanian footballer
- Devis Miorin (born 1976), Italian former cyclist
- Devis Nossa (born 1985), Italian footballer
- Devis Vásquez (born 1998), Colombian football goalkeeper

== Surname ==
- Anthony Devis (1729–1816), English landscape painter, half-brother of Arthur Devis
- Arthur Devis (1712–1787), English painter
- Arthur William Devis (1762–1822), English painter, son of the above
- Charles Walter De Vis (1829–1915), originally spelled Devis, English zoologist, ornithologist, herpetologist and botanist
- Ellin Devis (1746–1820), schoolmistress and author of The Accidence, a popular eighteenth-century grammar, daughter of Arthur Devis
