= Fort Davis, Oklahoma =

- Fortification
- Country: United States
- State: Oklahoma
- Counties: Muskogee
- Founded: November 1861
- Website: Fort Davis, Oklahoma

Fort Davis, Oklahoma was established in 1861 on the south bank of the Arkansas River two and one-half miles northeast of present-day Muskogee, Oklahoma to serve as a Confederate States of America headquarters in Indian Territory. The fort's name honored President of the Confederate States of America Jefferson Davis. First called Cantonment Davis, its purposes were to help retain the loyalty of the Indian Territory to the Confederacy and to prevent Union Army invasions into Texas from the north.

When Brigadier General Albert Pike was given command of all Confederate troops in Indian Territory in the fall of 1861, he first located his headquarters at Fort Gibson, which had been abandoned by Federal troops in 1857. When Union Army forces began to make inroads into the territory from the north, he withdrew his troops from Fort Gibson to a more defensible site just across the river on the Texas Road, an important supply line, and began the construction of Fort Davis in November, 1861. When complete, the fort comprised 13 wooden buildings, including barracks, a commissary, stables, and other outbuildings covering an area of about eight acres, without a stockade. The post centered on a prehistoric mound that helped conceal troop activity and provided visibility of the surrounding area from its elevation. Troops from the Five Civilized Tribes, Texas, and Arkansas garrisoned the fort.

In 1862, Pike and his Native American troops were ordered out to support General Earl Van Dorn in northwest Arkansas. Despite valiant service by the Indian Territory soldiers, the Confederates lost two key battles, the Battle of Pea Ridge in March and the Battle of Prairie Grove in December, and northwest Arkansas and most of the Cherokee Nation fell under Union Army control.

With the Confederate defeat at the Battle of Pea Ridge, Fort Davis became increasingly vulnerable to attack. When Fort Gibson was seized by Union troops, Pike put Brigadier General Douglas H. Cooper in charge of Fort Davis and moved most of the Native American regiments farther south, and Fort Davis's key role in the Civil War came to an end.

On December 27, 1862, Union Army troops led by Colonel William A. Phillips burned Fort Davis. The fort's site was placed on the National Register of Historic Places in 1971.
