= Davis Wendzel =

American baseball player (born 1997)

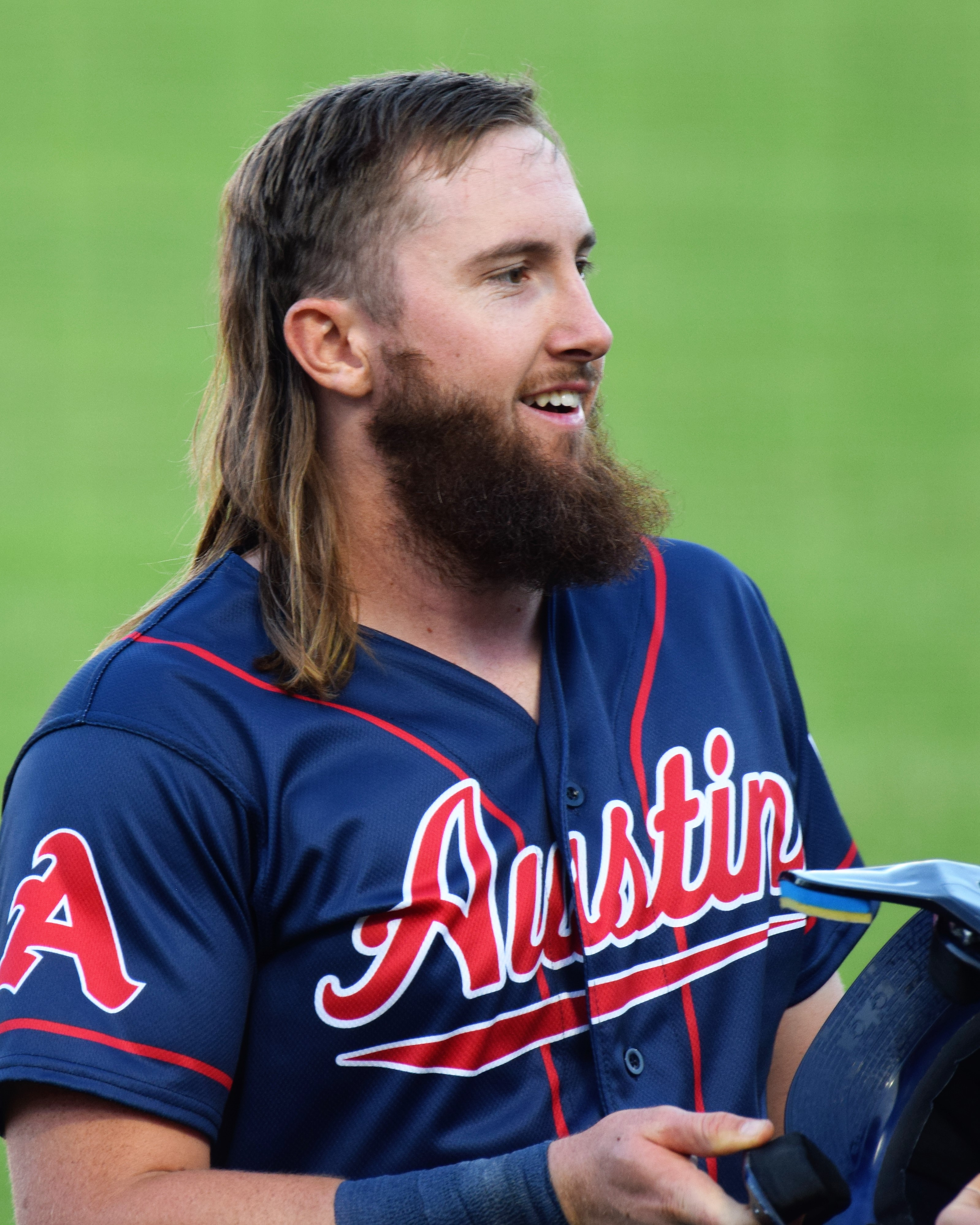
- Wendzel with the Round Rock Express in 2022

Free agent
- Infielder
- Born: May 23, 1997 (age 29); Irvine, California, U.S.
- Bats: Right Throws: Right

MLB debut
- April 9, 2024, for the Texas Rangers

MLB statistics (through 2026 season)
- Batting average: .118
- Home runs: 1
- Runs batted in: 2
- Stats at Baseball Reference

Teams
- Texas Rangers (2024); Pittsburgh Pirates (2026)

Davis McKee Wendzel (born May 23, 1997) is an American professional baseball infielder who is a free agent. He has previously played in Major League Baseball (MLB) for the Texas Rangers and Pittsburgh Pirates. He played college baseball for the Baylor Bears. The Rangers selected him selected in the first round of the 2019 MLB draft, and he made his MLB debut with them in 2024.

== Amateur career ==
Wendzel attended JSerra Catholic High School in San Juan Capistrano, California. He enrolled at Baylor University to play college baseball for the Baylor Bears.

In 2017, Wendzel's freshman year at Baylor, he appeared in 50 games (47 being starts), hitting .301 with eight home runs and thirty RBIs, earning a spot on the Big 12 All-Freshman Team. As a sophomore in 2018, he started 58 games and batted .310 with eight home runs and 49 RBIs. He was selected by the Boston Red Sox in the 37th round of the 2018 Major League Baseball draft but did not sign. He played in the Cape Cod Baseball League for the Hyannis Harbor Hawks that summer. In 2019, his junior season, he hit .367 with eight home runs, 42 RBIs, and 11 stolen bases in 46 games and was named the 2019 Big 12 Co-Player of the Year, along with future teammate Josh Jung of Texas Tech.

== Professional career ==
=== Texas Rangers ===
The Texas Rangers selected Wendzel in Competitive Balance Round A, with the 41st overall pick, of the 2019 Major League Baseball draft. On July 3, 2019, Wendzel signed with the Rangers for a $1.6 million signing bonus. After signing, Wendzel sat out of game action while rehabbing a thumb injury that he suffered in June while playing for Baylor. On August 22, he was assigned to the Arizona League Rangers of the Rookie-level Arizona League and made his professional debut. On August 30, Wendzel and the AZL Rangers won the 2019 Arizona League championship. Wendzel finished the 2019 season with the Spokane Indians of the Low-A Northwest League. Over seven games between the two teams, he batted .316 with one home run.

Wendzel did not play in a game in 2020 due to the cancellation of the minor league season because of the COVID-19 pandemic. To begin the 2021 season, he was assigned to the Frisco RoughRiders of the Double-A Central. On May 27, he was placed the injured list with a hamate bone fracture, and was activated in mid-August. After the end of Frisco's season in mid-September, he was promoted to the Round Rock Express of the Triple-A West. Between 63 games played with Frisco, Round Rock, and Arizona Complex League Rangers, Wendzel hit a combined .238/.346/.399 with eight home runs and 32 RBIs. Wendzel spent the 2022 season back with Round Rock but missed a brief period due to injury. Over 83 games, he slashed .212/.293/.407 with 17 home runs and 51 RBIs.

Wendzel began the 2023 season with Round Rock. Over 124 games, he hit a combined .236/.361/.477 with 30 home runs and 74 RBIs. He tied for the most home runs in the Pacific Coast League with Jake Scheiner and Trey Cabbage. On May 29, he was named Pacific Coast League player of the week and on June 8, Pacific Coast League player of the month. Wendzel is noted for his hitting against left-handed pitchers as well as fielding capabilities, with an average fielding percentage of .958, including 60 double plays.

On April 9, 2024, Texas selected Wendzel’s contract and promoted him to the major leagues for the first time. On April 25, against the Seattle Mariners, Wendzel collected his first major league hit, a single off pitcher Gabe Speier as a pinch hitting for Evan Carter. In 27 games for Texas, he batted .128/.163/.234 with one home run and two RBI. Wendzel was designated for assignment by the Rangers on July 29.

=== Cincinnati Reds ===
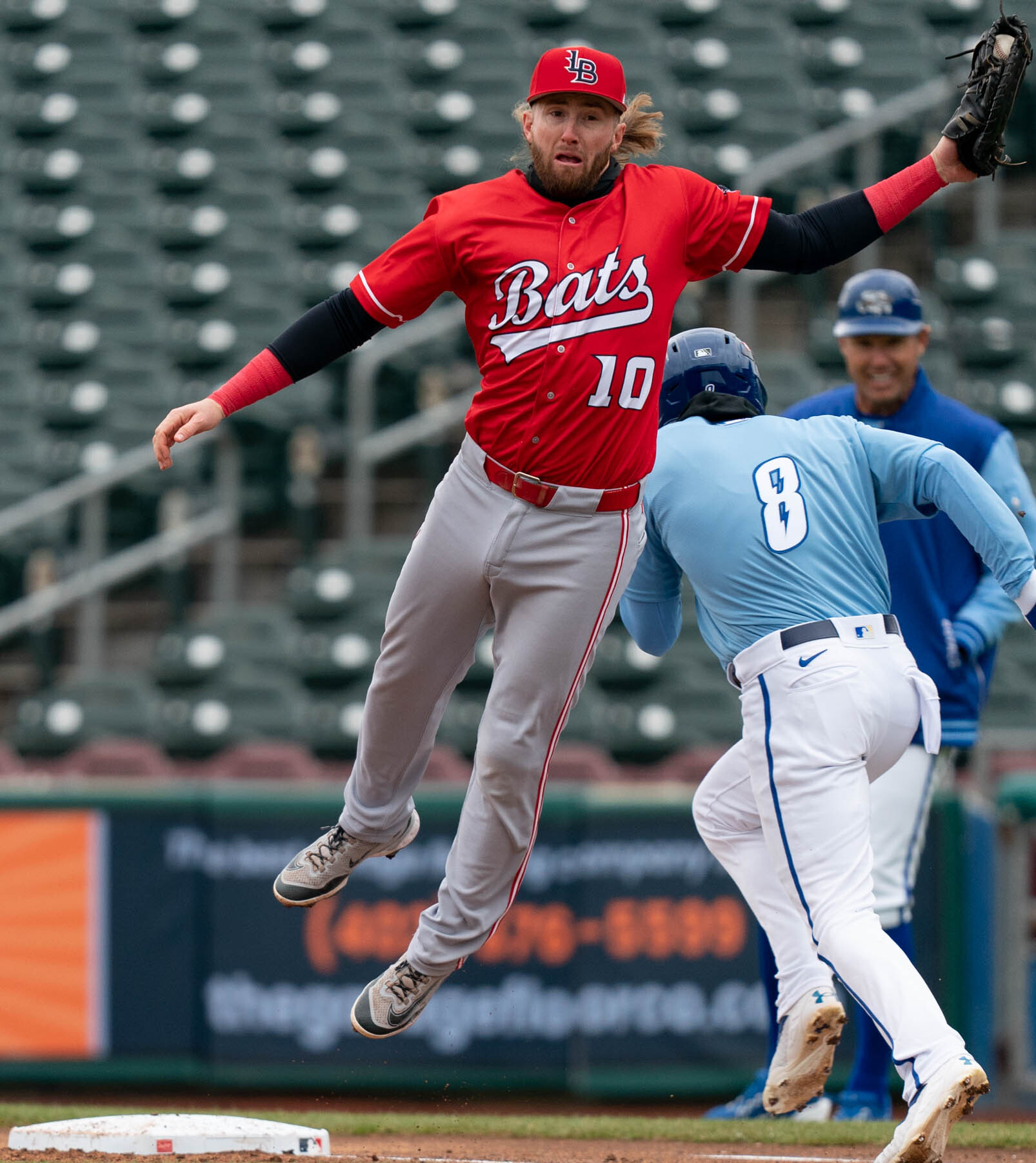
Wendzel defensively for Louisville in 2025

On July 30, 2024, Texas traded Wendzel to the Cincinnati Reds in exchange for cash considerations and joined the Triple-A Louisville Bats. He was designated for assignment by the Reds on August 30. Wendzel cleared waivers and was sent outright to Triple-A on September 2. In 43 appearances for Louisville, he slashed .247/.331/.340 with two home runs, 20 RBI, and one stolen base.

In 2025, Wendzel made 94 appearances for the Louisville Bats and 4 appearances, as part of a 4 game rehab assignment, with the High-A Dayton Dragons. For Louisville he batted .251/.341/.427 with 13 home runs and 53 RBI and had a .987 fielding percentage. He elected free agency following the season on November 6, 2025.

=== Pittsburgh Pirates ===
On December 18, 2025, Wendzel signed a minor league contract with the Pittsburgh Pirates. He was assigned to the Triple-A Indianapolis Indians to begin the regular season, slashing .246/.360/.491 with nine home runs, 34 RBI, and two stolen bases. On June 7, 2026, the Pirates selected Wendzel's contract, adding him to their active roster. In two appearances for Pittsburgh, he went 0-for-4. Wendzel was designated for assignment and released by the Pirates on July 5.
