= Gerson Garabito =

Dominican baseball player (born 1995)

Free agent
- Pitcher
- Born: August 19, 1995 (age 31); San Cristóbal, Dominican Republic
- Bats: Right Throws: Right

Professional debut
- MLB: May 26, 2024, for the Texas Rangers
- KBO: June 26, 2025, for the Samsung Lions

MLB statistics (through 2025 season)
- Win–loss record: 0–2
- Earned run average: 5.77
- Strikeouts: 30

KBO statistics (through 2025 season)
- Win–loss record: 4–4
- Earned run average: 2.64
- Strikeouts: 84
- Stats at Baseball Reference

Teams
- Texas Rangers (2024–2025); Samsung Lions (2025)

Gerson Yeris Garabito (born August 19, 1995) is a Dominican professional baseball pitcher who is a free agent. He has previously played in Major League Baseball (MLB) for the Texas Rangers, and in the KBO League for the Samsung Lions. He made his MLB debut in 2024.

== Career ==
=== Kansas City Royals ===
Garabito signed as an international free agent with the Kansas City Royals on September 17, 2012. He spent his first two professional seasons with the Dominican Summer League Royals, pitching to a cumulative 1.89 ERA with 78 strikeouts across 25 appearances (15 starts).

Garabito spent the 2015 season back at the rookie–level with the Arizona League Royals, posting a 4.11 ERA across 14 games (11 starts). The following season, he played for the Single–A Lexington Legends, posting a 2–11 record and 4.80 ERA with 61 strikeouts across 18 starts. Garabito split the 2017 campaign between Lexington and the AZL Royals, combining for a 4–5 record and 2.93 ERA with 74 strikeouts across 80 innings pitched.

In 2018, Garabito spent the campaign with the High–A Wilmington Blue Rocks, recording an 8–6 record and 116 strikeouts across 26 starts. In addition, he led the Carolina League with a 3.16 earned run average (ERA). In 2019, he made 26 starts for the Double–A Northwest Arkansas Naturals, logging a 6–12 record and 3.77 ERA with 113 strikeouts across 141 innings pitched. Garabito did not play in a game in 2020 due to the cancellation of the minor league season because of the COVID-19 pandemic. He became a free agent on November 2, 2020.

=== San Francisco Giants ===
On November 20, 2020, Garabito signed a minor league contract with the San Francisco Giants. He split the 2021 season between the Double–A Richmond Flying Squirrels and Triple–A Sacramento River Cats, accumulating a 3–6 record and 4.50 ERA with 80 strikeouts across 86 innings pitched. Garabito elected free agency following the season on November 7, 2021.

=== Texas Rangers ===
On December 18, 2023, after two years playing only in winter ball, Garabito signed a minor league contract with the Texas Rangers. He made 7 appearances for the Double–A Frisco RoughRiders and Triple–A Round Rock Express, compiling a 2.05 ERA with 37 strikeouts across 30 2/3 innings pitched. On May 26, 2024, Garabito was selected to the 40-man roster and promoted to the major leagues for the first time. Garabito's debut was a start against the Minnesota Twins. He pitched 3 2/3 innings and allowed only one run. Garabito did not qualify for a win (5+ innings). He pitched a combined 2 more innings before being sent down, and did not allow a run in those two innings. Garabito made 18 appearances for Texas during his rookie campaign, compiling an 0–2 record and 4.78 ERA with 22 strikeouts across 26 1/3 innings pitched.

Garabito was initially optioned to Triple-A Round Rock to begin the 2025 season. However, the Rangers later reversed their decision and added him to their Opening Day roster. In three appearances for Texas, he recorded a 9.00 ERA with eight strikeouts over eight innings of work. Garabito was released by the Rangers on June 14, 2025, in order to pursue an opportunity in the KBO League.

=== Samsung Lions ===
On June 18, 2025, Garabito signed with the Samsung Lions of the KBO League. Garabito made 15 starts for the Lions, registering a 4–4 record and 2.64 ERA with 84 strikeouts across 78 1/3 innings pitched.

=== Milwaukee Brewers ===
On December 17, 2025, Garabito signed a minor league contract with the Milwaukee Brewers. On February 23, 2026, it was announced that Garabito would miss at least four months after undergoing surgery to repair a broken bone in his foot. In 27 games (5 starts) between Triple-A and rookie ball he threw 48.2 innings going 4-4 with a 4.44 ERA and 44 strikeouts. He elected free agency on November 2.
