= 2026 Texas Rangers season =

Major League Baseball season

2026 Texas Rangers
- League: American League
- Division: West
- Ballpark: Globe Life Field
- City: Arlington
- Record: 80–82 (.494)
- Divisional place: 2nd
- Owners: Ray Davis & Bob R. Simpson
- President of baseball operations: Chris Young
- General managers: Ross Fenstermaker
- Manager: Skip Schumaker
- Television: Rangers Sports Network; Victory+ (direct-to-consumer streaming)
- Radio: KRLD 105.3 FM (English); KZMP 1540 AM (Spanish)
- Stats: ESPN.com; Baseball Reference

The 2026 Texas Rangers season was the 66th of the Texas Rangers franchise overall, their 55th in Arlington as the Rangers, and the 7th season at Globe Life Field.

Rangers Manager Bruce Bochy stepped down at the end of the 2025 season and on October 3, 2025, the team hired Skip Schumaker to replace him for the 2026 season.

The Rangers controlled their own destiny entering the last week of the season atop the American League West; however, they lost five of their last seven games and finished a game behind the Houston Astros, who were the first team in MLB history to win a division in a non-shortened season without a winning record.

== Regular season ==
=== Season standings ===
==== American League West ====
AL West
Team	W	L	Pct.	GB	Home	Road
Houston Astros	81	81	.500	—	39‍–‍42	42‍–‍39
Texas Rangers	80	82	.494	1	45‍–‍36	35‍–‍46
Seattle Mariners	76	86	.469	5	43‍–‍38	33‍–‍48
Athletics	64	98	.395	17	32‍–‍49	32‍–‍49
Los Angeles Angels	62	100	.383	19	34‍–‍47	28‍–‍53

==== American League Wild Card ====
Division leaders
Team	W	L	Pct.
Tampa Bay Rays	98	64	.605
Cleveland Guardians	85	77	.525
Houston Astros	81	81	.500

Wild Card teams (Top 3 teams qualify for postseason)
Team	W	L	Pct.	GB
New York Yankees	93	68	.578	+9½
Boston Red Sox	87	75	.537	+3
Chicago White Sox	84	78	.519	—
Texas Rangers	80	82	.494	4
Baltimore Orioles	79	82	.491	4½
Toronto Blue Jays	79	83	.488	5
Minnesota Twins	77	85	.475	7
Detroit Tigers	76	86	.469	8
Seattle Mariners	76	86	.469	8
Kansas City Royals	69	93	.426	15
Athletics	64	98	.395	20
Los Angeles Angels	62	100	.383	22

==== Record against opponents ====
2026 American League record Source: MLB Standings Grid – 2026
Team	ATH	BAL	BOS	CWS	CLE	DET	HOU	KC	LAA	MIN	NYY	SEA	TB	TEX	TOR	NL
Athletics	—	2–4	3–4	1–5	1–5	0–6	6–7	2–5	8–5	3–3	3–3	7–6	0–6	7–6	2–4	19–29
Baltimore	4–2	—	4–9	4–2	3–4	4–2	5–1	5–1	3–3	3–3	3–9	3–4	8–5	2–4	7–6	21–27
Boston	4–3	9–4	—	6–0	3–3	5–2	1–5	5–1	4–2	1–5	6–7	3–3	6–7	3–3	4–9	27–21
Chicago	5–1	2–4	0–6	—	7–6	9–4	2–5	9–4	4–2	8–5	3–4	3–3	2–4	4–2	5–1	21–27
Cleveland	5–1	4–3	3–3	6–7	—	10–3	2–4	7–6	6–0	6–7	2–4	4–3	1–5	2–4	2–4	25–23
Detroit	6–0	2–4	2–5	4–9	3–10	—	2–5	6–7	3–3	5–8	4–2	4–2	4–2	4–2	3–3	24–24
Houston	7–6	1–5	5–1	5–2	4–2	5–2	—	4–2	7–6	2–4	3–3	3–10	2–4	9–4	3–3	21–27
Kansas City	5–2	1–5	1–5	4–9	6–7	7–6	2–4	—	5–1	8–5	0–6	5–1	2–5	1–5	3–3	19–29
Los Angeles	5–8	3–3	2–4	2–4	0–6	3–3	6–7	1–5	—	3–4	3–4	6–7	3–3	8–5	2–4	15–33
Minnesota	3–3	3–3	5–1	5–8	7–6	8–5	4–2	5–8	4–3	—	3–3	2–4	1–5	5–1	4–3	18–30
New York	3–3	9–3	7–6	4–3	4–2	2–4	3–3	6–0	4–3	3–3	—	4–2	6–7	4–2	7–6	27–21
Seattle	6–7	4–3	3–3	3–3	3–4	2–4	10–3	1–5	7–6	4–2	2–4	—	1–5	5–8	2–4	23–25
Tampa Bay	6–0	5–8	7–6	4–2	5–1	2–4	4–2	5–2	3–3	5–1	7–6	5–1	—	4–3	9–4	27–21
Texas	6–7	4–2	3–3	2–4	4–2	2–4	4–9	5–1	5–8	1–5	2–4	8–5	3–4	—	6–1	25–23
Toronto	4–2	6–7	9–4	1–5	4–2	3–3	3–3	3–3	4–2	3–4	6–7	4–2	4–9	1–6	—	24–24

Updated with the results of all games through September 27, 2026.

== Game log ==
=== Regular season ===
Legend
Rangers Win	Rangers Loss	Game postponed	Eliminated from playoff race

2026 Game Log: 80–82 (Home: 45–36; Away: 35–46)
March/April: 15–16 (Home: 7–8; Road: 8–8)

#	Date	Opponent	Score	Win	Loss	Save	Attendance	Record	Streak
1	March 26	@ Phillies	3–5	Sánchez (1–0)	Eovaldi (0–1)	Durán (1)	44,610	0–1	L1
2	March 28	@ Phillies	5–4 (10)	Martin (1–0)	Durán (0–1)	Alexander (1)	40,051	1–1	W1
3	March 29	@ Phillies	8–3	Gore (1–0)	Luzardo (0–1)	—	38,018	2–1	W2
4	March 30	@ Orioles	5–2	Leiter (1–0)	Bassitt (0–1)	Alexander (2)	11,209	3–1	W3
5	March 31	@ Orioles	8–5	Winn (1–0)	Canó (0–1)	—	13,542	4–1	W4
6	April 1	@ Orioles	3–8	Rogers (2–0)	Eovaldi (0–2)	Suárez (1)	14,324	4–2	L1
7	April 3	Reds	3–5	Santillan (1–0)	Martin (1–1)	Pagán (2)	37,635	4–3	L2
8	April 4	Reds	0–2	Lowder (1–0)	Rocker (0–1)	Pagán (3)	36,393	4–4	L3
9	April 5	Reds	1–2	Moll (1–0)	Garcia (0–1)	Burke (1)	31,561	4–5	L4
10	April 6	Mariners	2–1	Beeks (1–0)	Gilbert (0–2)	Junis (1)	23,901	5–5	W1
11	April 7	Mariners	3–2	Eovaldi (1–2)	Kirby (1–2)	Junis (2)	22,411	6–5	W2
12	April 8	Mariners	3–0	Gore (2–0)	Woo (0–1)	Winn (1)	20,997	7–5	W3
13	April 10	@ Dodgers	7–8	Díaz (1–0)	Latz (0–1)	—	53,675	7–6	L1
14	April 11	@ Dodgers	3–6	Sheehan (2–0)	Leiter (1–1)	Vesia (1)	53,617	7–7	L2
15	April 12	@ Dodgers	5–2	deGrom (1–0)	Sasaki (0–2)	Junis (3)	48,530	8–7	W1
16	April 13	@ Athletics	8–1	Eovaldi (2–2)	Severino (0–2)	—	8,344	9–7	W2
17	April 14	@ Athletics	1–2	Springs (3–0)	Gore (2–1)	Leiter Jr. (2)	8,031	9–8	L1
18	April 15	@ Athletics	5–6	Harris (1–0)	Beeks (1–1)	Kuhnel (3)	9,252	9–9	L2
19	April 16	@ Athletics	9–6	Quantrill (1–0)	Sterner (0–2)	—	8,764	10–9	W1
20	April 17	@ Mariners	5–0	Collyer (1–0)	Gilbert (1–3)	—	28,253	11–9	W2
21	April 18	@ Mariners	3–7	Kirby (3–2)	Eovaldi (2–3)	Muñoz (2)	45,552	11–10	L1
22	April 19	@ Mariners	2–5	Woo (1–2)	Gore (2–2)	Muñoz (3)	35,474	11–11	L2
23	April 21	Pirates	5–1	Rocker (1–1)	Mlodzinski (1–1)	—	23,910	12–11	W1
24	April 22	Pirates	4–8	Soto (1–0)	Winn (1–1)	—	24,289	12–12	L1
25	April 23	Pirates	6–1	deGrom (2–0)	Chandler (1–2)	—	24,430	13–12	W1
26	April 24	Athletics	1–8	Severino (1–2)	Eovaldi (2–4)	—	30,396	13–13	L1
27	April 25	Athletics	4–3	Winn (2–1)	Springs (3–2)	Latz (1)	35,810	14–13	W1
28	April 26	Athletics	1–2	Sterner (1–2)	Rocker (1–2)	Perkins (2)	32,031	14–14	L1
29	April 27	Yankees	2–4	Fried (4–1)	Leiter (1–2)	Bednar (8)	29,601	14–15	L2
30	April 28	Yankees	2–3	Schlittler (4–1)	deGrom (2–1)	Bednar (9)	26,767	14–16	L3
31	April 29	Yankees	3–0	Eovaldi (3–4)	Rodríguez (0–1)	Latz (2)	30,408	15–16	W1

May: 13–15 (Home: 8–5; Road: 5–10)

#	Date	Opponent	Score	Win	Loss	Save	Attendance	Record	Streak
32	May 1	@ Tigers	5–4	Alexander (1–0)	Smith (0–1)	Latz (3)	28,622	16–16	W2
33	May 2	@ Tigers	1–5	Montero (2–2)	Rocker (1–3)	—	33,373	16–17	L1
34	May 3	@ Tigers	1–7	Hurter (4–0)	Leiter (1–3)	—	24,083	16–18	L2
35	May 5	@ Yankees	4–7	Headrick (2–0)	deGrom (2–2)	Bednar (10)	38,360	16–19	L3
36	May 6	@ Yankees	6–1	Eovaldi (4–4)	Warren (4–1)	—	40,269	17–19	W1
37	May 7	@ Yankees	2–9	Headrick (3–0)	Gore (2–3)	—	42,729	17–20	L1
38	May 8	Cubs	1–7	Assad (3–1)	Rocker (1–4)	—	32,394	17–21	L2
39	May 9	Cubs	6–0	Beeks (2–1)	Cabrera (3–1)	—	35,807	18–21	W1
40	May 10	Cubs	3–0	deGrom (3–2)	Taillon (2–2)	Latz (4)	34,221	19–21	W2
41	May 11	Diamondbacks	0–1	Soroka (5–2)	Junis (0–1)	Sewald (9)	22,651	19–22	L1
42	May 12	Diamondbacks	7–4	Gore (3–3)	Gallen (1–4)	Latz (5)	23,160	20–22	W1
43	May 13	Diamondbacks	6–5	Quantrill (2–0)	Sewald (0–4)	—	26,049	21–22	W2
44	May 15	@ Astros	0–2	Arrighetti (5–1)	Leiter (1–4)	King (4)	32,555	21–23	L1
45	May 16	@ Astros	1–4	Teng (2–3)	deGrom (3–3)	Abreu (2)	32,315	21–24	L2
46	May 17	@ Astros	8–0	Eovaldi (5–4)	Lambert (2–4)	—	34,893	22–24	W1
47	May 18	@ Rockies	6–7	Quintana (2–2)	Gore (3–4)	Mejía (3)	16,126	22–25	L1
48	May 19	@ Rockies	10–0	Rocker (2–4)	Peralta (0–1)	—	15,916	23–25	W1
49	May 20	@ Rockies	5–4	Latz (1–1)	Bernardino (2–2)	—	18,726	24–25	W2
50	May 22	@ Angels	6–9	Rodriguez (1–1)	deGrom (3–4)	—	32,488	24–26	L1
51	May 23	@ Angels	2–5	Ureña (2–4)	Eovaldi (5–5)	Yates (1)	31,860	24–27	L2
52	May 24	@ Angels	1–2	Bachman (1–0)	Collyer (1–1)	—	36,903	24–28	L3
53	May 25	Astros	0–9	Imai (2–2)	Rocker (2–5)	—	36,180	24–29	L4
54	May 26	Astros	10–7	Leiter (2–4)	Alexander (1–1)	Latz (6)	28,778	25–29	W1
55	May 27	Astros	3–4	Burrows (3–6)	Alexander (1–1)	De Los Santos (4)	27,073	25–30	L1
56	May 28	Astros	1–5	Arrighetti (7–1)	Eovaldi (5–6)	—	27,234	25–31	L2
57	May 29	Royals	9–1	Gore (4–4)	Kolek (3–1)	—	39,704	26–31	W1
58	May 30	Royals	7–6	Gray (1–0)	Erceg (3–3)	—	32,270	27–31	W2
59	May 31	Royals	6–3	Leiter (3–4)	Wacha (4–3)	Latz (7)	33,587	28–31	W3

June: 16–11 (Home: 4–5; Road: 12–6)

#	Date	Opponent	Score	Win	Loss	Save	Attendance	Record	Streak
60	June 1	@ Cardinals	2–1	deGrom (4–4)	McGreevy (3–5)	Latz (8)	21,770	29–31	W4
61	June 2	@ Cardinals	7–4	Quantrill (3–0)	O'Brien (3–3)	Junis (4)	24,859	30–31	W5
62	June 3	@ Cardinals	3–5	Pallante (6–4)	Gore (4–5)	O'Brien (15)	21,400	30–32	L1
63	June 5	Guardians	3–2	Gray (2–0)	Messick (6–2)	Latz (9)	27,738	31–32	W1
64	June 6	Guardians	0–6	Bibee (1–7)	Leiter (3–5)	—	31,608	31–33	L1
65	June 7	Guardians	10–0	deGrom (5–4)	Cantillo (4–3)	—	34,851	32–33	W1
66	June 9	@ Royals	3–5	Cruz (1–2)	Eovaldi (5–7)	Lange (4)	25,075	32–34	L1
67	June 10	@ Royals	6–4 (10)	Junis (1–1)	Lange (0–3)	Latz (10)	16,015	33–34	W1
68	June 11	@ Royals	4–2	Ahlstrom (1–0)	Wacha (4–5)	Latz (11)	17,622	34–34	W2
69	June 12	@ Red Sox	1–10	Gray (8–1)	Leiter (3–6)	—	33,919	34–35	L1
70	June 13	@ Red Sox	3–6	Whitlock (4–1)	Winn (2–2)	Chapman (14)	34,556	34–36	L2
71	June 14	@ Red Sox	6–4	Eovaldi (6–7)	Early (5–5)	Latz (12)	32,006	35–36	W1
72	June 15	Twins	2–4	Rogers (3–3)	Gore (4–6)	Gómez (7)	25,957	35–37	L1
73	June 16	Twins	2–12	Matthews (3–4)	Rocker (2–6)	—	27,463	35–38	L2
74	June 18	Twins	3–9	Ryan (5–3)	Leiter (3–7)	—	30,606	35–39	L3
75	June 19	Padres	9–7	deGrom (6–4)	Vásquez (6–5)	Latz (13)	33,406	36–39	W1
76	June 20	Padres	4–6 (10)	Morejón (6–1)	Ross (0–1)	Miller (20)	35,383	36–40	L1
77	June 21	Padres	4–3	Eovaldi (7–7)	Giolito (2–3)	Junis (5)	36,311	37–40	W1
78	June 22	@ Marlins	4–3	Ahlstrom (2–0)	Faucher (4–4)	Latz (14)	20,008	38–40	W2
79	June 23	@ Marlins	4–6	Alcántara (8–4)	Corniell (0–1)	—	9,971	38–41	L1
80	June 24	@ Marlins	2–4	King (5–1)	deGrom (6–5)	Fairbanks (12)	13,710	38–42	L2
81	June 25	@ Blue Jays	6–5	Gore (5–6)	Gausman (4–6)	Latz (15)	35,273	39–42	W1
82	June 26	@ Blue Jays	5–4	Eovaldi (8–7)	Corbin (2–4)	Latz (16)	41,689	40–42	W2
83	June 27	@ Blue Jays	7–4	Gray (3–0)	Cease (4–4)	Alexander (3)	41,657	41–42	W3
84	June 28	@ Blue Jays	3–2	Winn (3–2)	Varland (3–3)	Alexander (4)	40,898	42–42	W4
85	June 29	@ Guardians	6–3	Ahlstrom (3–0)	Messick (7–5)	Latz (17)	20,379	43–42	W5
86	June 30	@ Guardians	4–2	deGrom (7–5)	Bibee (2–9)	Latz (18)	21,674	44–42	W6

July: 11–13 (Home: 9–7; Road: 2–6)

#	Date	Opponent	Score	Win	Loss	Save	Attendance	Record	Streak
87	July 1	@ Guardians	4–9	Cantillo (7–3)	Gore (5–7)	—	20,141	44–43	L1
88	July 2	Tigers	10–4	Eovaldi (9–7)	Valdez (4–6)	—	33,450	45–43	W1
89	July 4	Tigers	0–3	Flaherty (2–8)	Quantrill (3–1)	Montero (1)	37,576	45–44	L1
90	July 5	Tigers	3–6	Mize (4–5)	Rocker (2–7)	Jansen (10)	27,887	45–45	L2
91	July 7	Angels	8–3	Gray (4–0)	Bachman (1–2)	—	23,816	46–45	W1
92	July 8	Angels	1–13	Natera Jr. (1–0)	Gore (5–8)	—	23,288	46–46	L1
93	July 9	Angels	7–6	Winn (4–2)	Yates (0–4)	—	29,646	47–46	W1
94	July 10	Astros	7–3	Winn (5–2)	King (2–2)	—	34,899	48–46	W2
95	July 11	Astros	3–9	Lambert (8–5)	Rocker (2–8)	—	37,318	48–47	L1
96	July 12	Astros	6–5	Latz (2–1)	Hader (3–1)	—	33,804	49–47	W1
96th All-Star Game: Philadelphia, PA
97	July 17	@ Braves	1–15	Sale (10–6)	Quantrill (3–2)	—	40,147	49–48	L1
98	July 18	@ Braves	7–6	Gore (6–8)	Kinley (5–4)	Latz (19)	37,056	50–48	W1
99	July 19	@ Braves	5–8	Holmes (6–4)	Eovaldi (9–8)	—	29,856	50–49	L1
100	July 20	White Sox	3–10	Murphy (3–0)	deGrom (7–6)	—	28,506	50–50	L2
101	July 21	White Sox	10–0	Rocker (3–8)	Schultz (3–7)	Gonzales (1)	26,108	51–50	W1
102	July 22	White Sox	2–4	Kay (7–4)	Quantrill (3–3)	Hudson (4)	31,127	51–51	L1
103	July 24	Mariners	5–4	Gray (5–0)	Miller (4–5)	Latz (20)	33,478	52–51	W1
104	July 25	Mariners	7–1	Eovaldi (10–8)	Woo (7–7)	—	34,006	53–51	W2
105	July 26	Mariners	4–6	Speier (2–2)	Winn (5–3)	Muñoz (18)	29,496	53–52	L1
106	July 27	Mariners	7–3	Rocker (4–8)	Kirby (8–9)	—	27,683	54–52	W1
107	July 28	@ Rays	4–1	Quantrill (4–3)	Jax (6–8)	Latz (21)	14,502	55–52	W2
108	July 29	@ Rays	0–3	Seymour (7–3)	Gore (6–9)	Baker (29)	14,200	55–53	L1
109	July 30	@ Rays	2–3	Cleavinger (3–3)	Peoples (0–1)	Baker (30)	15,322	55–54	L2
110	July 31	@ Astros	2–11	Brown (3–1)	Eovaldi (10–9)	—	36,621	55–55	L3

August: 13–15 (Home: 9–4; Road: 4–11)

#	Date	Opponent	Score	Win	Loss	Save	Attendance	Record	Streak
111	August 1	@ Astros	4–5	Okert (5–1)	deGrom (7–7)	Hader (15)	38,461	55–56	L4
112	August 2	@ Astros	3–7	Abreu (3–3)	Alexander (1–2)	Blubaugh (1)	33,955	55–57	L5
113	August 3	Giants	1–5	Webb (7–7)	Quantrill (4–4)	—	23,736	55–58	L6
114	August 4	Giants	5–4	Latz (3–1)	Smith (0–4)	—	26,959	56–58	W1
115	August 5	Giants	6–0	Alexander (2–2)	Whisenhunt (2–3)	—	26,098	57–58	W2
116	August 7	Orioles	2–1	Alexander (3–2)	Baz (4–11)	Latz (22)	27,804	58–58	W3
117	August 8	Orioles	5–1	deGrom (8–7)	Bradish (7–11)	–	38,626	59–58	W4
118	August 9	Orioles	5–10	Hiraldo (1–0)	Rocker (4–9)	—	35,334	59–59	L1
119	August 10	@ Angels	4–1 (10)	Gray (6–0)	Murphy (0–1)	Latz (23)	23,880	60–59	W1
120	August 11	@ Angels	2–3	Fermín (4–2)	Bradford (0–1)	Natera Jr. (3)	23,648	60–60	L1
121	August 12	@ Angels	2–5	Klassen (1–1)	Ahlstrom (3–1)	Joyce (1)	33,733	60–61	L2
122	August 13	@ Angels	0–7	Ureña (8–8)	deGrom (8–8)	—	24,959	60–62	L3
123	August 14	@ Athletics	3–8	Medina (3–3)	Silseth (3–3)	—	8,082	60–63	L4
124	August 15	@ Athletics	5–3	Gore (7–9)	Ginn (8–7)	Latz (24)	10,070	61–63	W1
125	August 16	@ Athletics	2–5	Medina (4–3)	Junis (1–2)	Harris (12)	7,343	61–64	L1
126	August 18	Nationals	5–0	Quantrill (5–4)	Kent (0–1)	—	22,126	62–64	W1
127	August 19	Nationals	0–6	Cavalli (11–5)	Rocker (4–10)	—	23,963	62–65	L1
128	August 20	Nationals	2–0	deGrom (9–8)	Alvarez (2–5)	Latz (25)	21,179	63–65	W1
129	August 21	Angels	2–1 (10)	Alexander (4–2)	Joyce (0–1)	—	29,309	64–65	W2
130	August 22	Angels	0–3	Johnson (3–7)	Bradford (0–2)	Watson (2)	35,836	64–66	L1
131	August 23	Angels	5–3	Quantrill (6–4)	Kikuchi (0–4)	Latz (26)	31,593	65–66	W1
132	August 24	@ White Sox	11–2	Rocker (5–10)	Urquidy (2–2)	—	11,471	66–66	W2
133	August 25	@ White Sox	7–11	Hudson (4–4)	deGrom (9–9)	Taylor (8)	19,892	66–67	L1
134	August 26	@ White Sox	4–10	Newcomb (2–3)	Gore (7–10)	Cannon (1)	16,038	66–68	L2
135	August 28	@ Brewers	1–6	Henderson (9–2)	Bradford (0–3)	—	41,620	66–69	L3
136	August 29	@ Brewers	3–5	Drohan (7–5)	Quantrill (6–5)	Megill (25)	36,895	66–70	L4
137	August 30	@ Brewers	7–4	Alexander (5–2)	May (6–9)	Latz (27)	37,996	67–70	W1
138	August 31	Athletics	8–1	deGrom (10–9)	Jump (6–9)	—	22,572	68–70	W2

September: 12–12 (Home: 8–7; Road: 4–5)

#	Date	Opponent	Score	Win	Loss	Save	Attendance	Record	Streak
139	September 1	Athletics	8–5	Gore (8–10)	Basso (0–2)	Latz (28)	24,253	69–70	W3
140	September 2	Athletics	2–9	Lopez (6–4)	Bradford (0–4)	—	23,801	69–71	L1
141	September 3	Rays	6–0	Quantrill (7–5)	McClanahan (10–7)	—	26,507	70–71	W1
142	September 4	Rays	6–7	Martinez (14–4)	Rocker (5–11)	Wells (6)	25,584	70–72	L1
143	September 5	Rays	3–6 (10)	Wells (4–2)	Latz (3–2)	—	31,657	70–73	L2
144	September 6	Rays	8–6	Williams (1–0)	Matz (5–5)	Junis (6)	33,285	71–73	W1
145	September 8	@ Mariners	10–5	Quantrill (8–5)	Miller (4–9)	—	35,476	72–73	W2
146	September 9	@ Mariners	2–3	Anderson (1–1)	Bradford (0–5)	Muñoz (26)	21,565	72–74	L1
147	September 10	@ Mariners	3–4	Gilbert (12–9)	Junis (1–3)	Muñoz (27)	24,784	72–75	L2
148	September 11	@ Diamondbacks	1–9	Ginkel (6–4)	Gore (8–11)	—	32,849	72–76	L3
149	September 12	@ Diamondbacks	6–2	Garcia (1–1)	Pfaadt (7–3)	—	34,300	73–76	W1
150	September 13	@ Diamondbacks	7–6	Quantrill (9–5)	Rodríguez (15–6)	Latz (29)	28,843	74–76	W2
151	September 15	Red Sox	4–2	deGrom (11–9)	Sandoval (1–6)	Latz (30)	30,907	75–76	W3
152	September 16	Red Sox	7–3	Eovaldi (11–9)	Miller (4–1)	—	26,364	76–76	W4
153	September 17	Red Sox	3–4	Olds (2–0)	Latz (3–3)	Whitlock (4)	30,828	76–77	L1
154	September 18	Blue Jays	7–1	Williams (2–0)	Cease (11–6)	—	31,045	77–77	W1
155	September 19	Blue Jays	6–2	Montgomery (1–0)	Soriano (12–8)	—	38,399	78–77	W2
156	September 20	Blue Jays	2–7	Arrighetti (9–9)	deGrom (11–10)	—	33,694	78–78	L1
157	September 22	Mets	3–6	Manaea (6–7)	Eovaldi (11–10)	Senga (8)	24,191	78–79	L2
158	September 23	Mets	2–7	McLean (12–10)	Latz (3–4)	—	30,188	78–80	L3
159	September 24	Mets	3–1	Rocker (6–11)	Thornton (5–6)	Montgomery (1)	25,320	79–80	W1
160	September 25	@ Twins	2–10	Ryan (7–10)	deGrom (11–11)	—	25,768	79–81	L1
161	September 26	@ Twins	6–2	Garcia (2–1)	Ober (7–7)	—	28,491	80–81	W1
162	September 27	@ Twins	4–6	Kremer (5–5)	Silseth (3–4)	—	26,839	80–82	L1

== Roster ==
2026 Texas Rangers
Roster
Pitchers: 54 Robby Ahlstrom; 13 Tyler Alexander; 45 Carter Baumler; 68 Jalen Beeks; 61 Cody Bradford; 65 Gavin Collyer; 59 José Corniell; 57 Luis Curvelo; 48 Jacob deGrom; 17 Nathan Eovaldi; 62 Robert Garcia; 50 Marco Gonzales; 1 MacKenzie Gore; 75 Peyton Gray; 16 Jakob Junis; 58 Nolan Kingham; 67 Jake Latz; 22 Jack Leiter; 71 Adam Macko; 31 Chris Martin; 52 Jordan Montgomery; 40 Chris Paddack; 70 Ben Peoples; 44 Cal Quantrill; 80 Kumar Rocker; 41 Joe Ross; 47 Winston Santos; 63 Chase Silseth; 56 Emiliano Teodo; 51 Trevor Williams; 60 Cole Winn	Catchers: 35 Elías Díaz; 11 Kyle Higashioka; 9 Danny Jansen; 4 Logan O'Hoppe; 38 Austin Wynns; Infielders: 37 Jonah Bride; 21 Jake Burger; 20 Ezequiel Durán; 14 Justin Foscue; 39 Cody Freeman; 6 Josh Jung; 33 Nicky Lopez; 3 Joc Pederson; 5 Corey Seager; 8 Josh H. Smith; 16 Donovan Solano	Outfielders: 32 Evan Carter; 27 Cam Cauley; 0 Sam Haggerty; 23 Michael Helman; 25 Jarred Kelenic; 36 Wyatt Langford; 4 Andrew McCutchen; 24 Brandon Nimmo; 19 Alejandro Osuna	Manager: 55 Skip Schumaker; Coaches: 88 Rod Barajas (quality control); 85 Dave Bush (assistant pitching); 73 Alex Cintrón (hitting); 82 Eric Dorton (assistant hitting); 87 Brett Hayes (catching); 96 Travis Jankowski (first base); 64 Corey Ragsdale (third base); 84 Colby Suggs (bullpen); 83 Jordan Tiegs (pitching); 81 Luis Urueta (bench); 89 Justin Viele (lead hitting)

== Player stats ==
= Indicates team leader

= Indicates league leader

=== Batting ===
Note: G = Games played; AB = At bats; R = Runs scored; H = Hits; 2B = Doubles; 3B = Triples; HR = Home runs; RBI = Runs batted in; SB = Stolen bases; BB = Bases on balls; AVG = Batting average; SLG = Slugging average

Player	G	AB	R	H	2B	3B	HR	RBI	SB	BB	AVG	SLG
Brandon Nimmo	155	593	65	154	36	4	14	62	7	51	.260	.405
Jake Burger	155	556	71	127	23	0	28	90	4	56	.228	.421
Ezequiel Durán	153	539	71	140	27	4	17	83	12	46	.260	.419
Wyatt Langford	110	411	64	98	20	2	17	44	15	55	.238	.421
Josh Jung	104	398	54	119	27	1	12	42	1	35	.299	.462
Evan Carter	141	391	52	76	14	3	9	40	17	47	.194	.315
Corey Seager	102	384	57	87	16	0	20	51	2	45	.227	.424
Joc Pederson	136	374	56	88	12	2	26	53	2	49	.235	.487
Nicky Lopez	96	232	24	64	5	1	1	24	5	12	.276	.319
Justin Foscue	100	225	26	61	13	1	11	34	0	17	.271	.484
Alejandro Osuna	84	204	27	53	6	0	1	25	5	19	.260	.304
Danny Jansen	67	197	21	40	9	1	8	26	1	18	.203	.381
Elías Díaz	77	196	18	46	11	0	6	30	0	8	.235	.383
Kyle Higashioka	56	165	20	36	4	0	7	18	0	19	.218	.370
Josh Smith	45	136	8	29	3	1	1	8	3	16	.213	.272
Cody Freeman	36	85	8	21	1	1	1	6	1	8	.247	.318
Andrew McCutchen	37	73	8	14	2	0	1	5	0	9	.192	.260
Cam Cauley	34	58	10	12	3	1	1	1	1	5	.207	.345
Sam Haggerty	35	44	3	7	1	0	0	1	2	2	.159	.182
Michael Helman	16	30	2	5	1	0	1	2	0	1	.167	.300
Austin Wynns	14	29	1	8	0	0	1	1	0	2	.276	.379
Jarred Kelenic	17	20	2	4	0	0	0	2	0	4	.200	.200
Logan O'Hoppe	10	17	5	6	1	0	0	1	0	0	.353	.412
Jonah Bride	2	5	0	1	0	0	0	0	0	1	.200	.200
Totals	162	5362	673	1296	235	22	183	649	78	525	.242	.396

=== Pitching ===
Note: W = Wins; L = Losses; ERA = Earned run average; G = Games pitched; GS = Games started; SV = Saves; IP = Innings pitched; H = Hits allowed; R = Runs allowed; ER = Earned runs allowed; BB = Walks allowed; SO = Strikeouts

Player	W	L	ERA	G	GS	SV	IP	H	R	ER	BB	SO
MacKenzie Gore	8	11	4.58	34	34	0	173.0	160	89	88	71	174
Jacob deGrom	11	11	4.20	31	31	0	162.2	139	76	76	46	201
Kumar Rocker	6	11	4.38	30	27	0	148.0	147	74	72	61	138
Nathan Eovaldi	11	10	4.20	27	23	0	145.2	142	71	68	35	144
Cal Quantrill	9	5	2.86	32	15	0	110.0	89	41	35	25	81
Jack Leiter	3	7	5.29	15	15	0	80.0	80	50	47	35	83
Tyler Alexander	5	2	3.70	75	5	4	73.0	73	34	30	23	60
Jacob Latz	3	4	2.13	58	1	30	72.0	35	19	17	23	83
Peyton Gray	6	0	3.86	49	0	0	56.0	56	29	24	17	60
Jakob Junis	1	3	3.64	53	1	6	54.1	51	22	22	18	38
Cole Winn	5	3	5.63	51	1	1	48.0	54	32	30	16	49
Cody Bradford	0	5	4.30	10	8	0	44.0	55	21	21	10	22
Robby Ahlstrom	3	1	6.08	42	0	0	37.0	38	26	25	15	34
Jordan Montgomery	1	0	4.15	13	0	1	26.0	20	12	12	6	20
Jalen Beeks	2	1	3.81	29	0	0	26.0	28	11	11	8	21
Gavin Collyer	1	1	5.40	24	0	0	25.0	17	16	15	19	23
Chase Silseth	0	2	5.31	26	0	0	20.1	21	12	12	13	26
Robert Garcia	2	1	2.41	20	0	0	18.2	13	7	5	9	11
Ben Peoples	0	1	2.76	16	0	0	16.1	14	5	5	8	10
Chris Martin	1	1	9.00	16	0	0	14.0	25	15	14	2	9
Trevor Williams	2	0	3.86	7	1	0	11.2	9	5	5	4	12
Luis Curvelo	0	0	9.58	9	0	0	10.1	17	12	11	7	6
Adam Macko	0	0	6.00	8	0	0	9.0	14	7	6	4	9
Joe Ross	0	1	4.50	5	0	0	8.0	9	5	4	2	5
Marco Gonzales	0	1	1.35	3	0	1	6.2	7	1	1	4	3
Carter Baumler	0	0	3.18	4	0	0	5.2	4	2	2	6	6
José Corniell	0	1	20.77	2	0	0	4.1	11	10	10	4	4
Chris Paddack	0	0	4.50	1	0	0	4.0	7	2	2	0	1
Kyle Higashioka	0	0	21.00	3	0	0	3.0	8	7	7	1	0
Winston Santos	0	0	9.00	1	0	0	2.0	2	2	2	1	1
Emiliano Teodo	0	0	10.80	1	0	0	1.2	3	2	2	2	1
Nolan Kingham	0	0	9.00	1	0	0	1.0	1	1	1	2	1
Sam Haggerty	0	0	0.00	1	0	0	1.0	0	0	0	0	0
Nicky Lopez	0	0	9.00	1	0	0	1.0	4	1	1	0	1
Totals	80	82	4.32	162	162	43	1419.1	1353	719	681	497	1337

== Farm system ==
Level	Team	League	Manager
Triple-A	Round Rock Express	Pacific Coast League	Kyle Moore
Double-A	Frisco RoughRiders	Texas League	Chad Comer
High-A	Hub City Spartanburgers	South Atlantic League	Carlos Maldonado
Single-A	Hickory Crawdads	Carolina League	Nick Janssen
Rookie	ACL Rangers	Arizona Complex League	Esteban Cardoza-Oquendo
Foreign Rookie	DSL Rangers Blue	Dominican Summer League	Marty Pitts
Foreign Rookie	DSL Rangers Red	Dominican Summer League	Carlos Paulino
