= 2001 in baseball =

The following are the baseball events of the year 2001 throughout the world.

== Champions ==
=== Major League Baseball ===
- Regular Season Champions

League	Eastern Division Champion	Central Division Champion	Western Division Champion	Wild Card Qualifier
American League	New York Yankees	Cleveland Indians	Seattle Mariners	Oakland Athletics
National League	Atlanta Braves	Houston Astros	Arizona Diamondbacks	St. Louis Cardinals

- World Series Champion – Arizona Diamondbacks
- Postseason – October 9 to November 4

Division Series; TV: ESPN/ABC Family/FOX
1	Seattle Mariners	3
3	Cleveland Indians	2
American League
2	New York Yankees	3
4	Oakland Athletics	2
1	Houston Astros	0
3	Atlanta Braves	3
2	Arizona Diamondbacks	3
4	St. Louis Cardinals	2

League Championship Series; TV: FOX
1	Seattle Mariners	1
2	New York Yankees	4
3	Atlanta Braves	1
2	Arizona Diamondbacks	4

World Series; TV: FOX
AL	New York Yankees	3
NL	Arizona Diamondbacks	4

Click on any series score to link to that series' page.
Higher seed has home field advantage during Division Series and League Championship Series.
The National League Champion has home field advantage during the World Series as a result of the pre-2003 "alternating years" rule.
American League is seeded 1-3/2-4 as a result of the AL regular season champion (Seattle Mariners) and the AL wild card (Oakland Athletics) coming from the same division.
National League is seeded 1-3/2-4 as a result of the NL regular season champion (Houston Astros) and the NL wild card (St. Louis Cardinals) coming from the same division.

- Postseason MVPs
  - World Series MVP – Randy Johnson and Curt Schilling
  - ALCS MVP – Andy Pettitte
  - NLCS MVP – Craig Counsell
- All-Star Game, July 10 at Safeco Field: American League, 4–1; Cal Ripken Jr., MVP
  - Home Run Derby, July 9 – Luis Gonzalez, Arizona Diamondbacks

=== Other champions ===
- Caribbean World Series: Águilas Cibaeñas (Dominican Republic)
- College World Series: Miami (Florida)
- Cuban National Series: Santiago de Cuba over Pinar del Río
- European Champions: Netherlands over Russia (4–0)
- European Cup: Neptunus (Netherlands) over San Marino (San Marino)
- Japan Series: Yakult Swallows over Osaka Kintetsu Buffaloes (4–1)
- Korean Series: Doosan Bears over Samsung Lions (4–2)
- Big League World Series: Westminster, California
- Junior League World Series: Aiea, Hawaii
- Little League World Series: Tokyo Kitasuna, Tokyo, Japan
- Senior League World Series: Palm Harbor, Florida
- Taiwan Series: Brother Elephants over Uni-President Lions

== Awards and honors ==
- Baseball Hall of Fame
  - Bill Mazeroski
  - Kirby Puckett
  - Dave Winfield
  - Hilton Smith
- Most Valuable Player
  - Ichiro Suzuki, Seattle Mariners, OF (AL)
  - Barry Bonds, San Francisco Giants, OF (NL)
- Cy Young Award
  - Roger Clemens, New York Yankees (AL)
  - Randy Johnson, Arizona Diamondbacks (NL)
- Rookie of the Year
  - Ichiro Suzuki, Seattle Mariners, OF (AL)
  - Albert Pujols, St. Louis Cardinals, 3B (NL)
- Manager of the Year Award
  - Lou Piniella, Seattle Mariners (AL)
  - Larry Bowa, Philadelphia Phillies (NL)
- Woman Executive of the Year (major or minor league): (tie)
  - Lori Webb, Southern League
  - Lina McNabb, Fort Myers Miracle, Florida State League

== MLB statistical leaders ==
	American League		National League
Type	Name	Stat	Name	Stat
AVG	Ichiro Suzuki SEA	.350	Larry Walker COL	.350
HR	Alex Rodriguez TEX	52	Barry Bonds^{1} SF	73
RBI	Bret Boone SEA	141	Sammy Sosa CHC	160
Wins	Mark Mulder OAK	21	Matt Morris STL; Curt Schilling AZ	22
ERA	Freddy García SEA	3.05	Randy Johnson AZ	2.49
Ks	Hideo Nomo BOS	220	Randy Johnson AZ	372

^{1} All-time single-season home runs record

== Major League Baseball final standings ==
American League
Rank	Club	Wins	Losses	Win %	GB
East Division
1st	New York Yankees	95	65	.594	--
2nd	Boston Red Sox	82	79	.509	13.5
3rd	Toronto Blue Jays	80	82	.494	16.0
4th	Baltimore Orioles	63	98	.391	32.5
5th	Tampa Bay Devil Rays	62	100	.383	34.0
Central Division
1st	Cleveland Indians	91	71	.562	--
2nd	Minnesota Twins	85	77	.525	6.0
3rd	Chicago White Sox	83	79	.512	8.0
4th	Detroit Tigers	66	96	.407	25.0
5th	Kansas City Royals	65	97	.401	26.0
West Division
1st	Seattle Mariners **	116	46	.716	--
2nd	Oakland Athletics *	102	60	.630	14.0
3rd	Anaheim Angels	75	87	.463	41.0
4th	Texas Rangers	73	89	.451	43.0

National League
Rank	Club	Wins	Losses	Win %	GB
East Division
1st	Atlanta Braves	88	74	.543	--
2nd	Philadelphia Phillies	86	76	.531	2.0
3rd	New York Mets	82	80	.506	6.0
4th	Florida Marlins	76	86	.469	12.0
5th	Montreal Expos	68	94	.420	20.0
Central Division
1st	Houston Astros	93	69	.574	--
2nd	St. Louis Cardinals *	93	69	.574	--
3rd	Chicago Cubs	88	74	.543	5.0
4th	Milwaukee Brewers	68	94	.420	25.0
5th	Cincinnati Reds	66	96	.407	27.0
6th	Pittsburgh Pirates	62	100	.383	31.0
WEST
1st	Arizona Diamondbacks	92	70	.568	--
2nd	San Francisco Giants	90	72	.556	2.0
3rd	Los Angeles Dodgers	86	76	.531	6.0
4th	San Diego Padres	79	83	.488	13.0
5th	Colorado Rockies	73	89	.451	19.0

- The asterisk denotes the club that won the wild card for its respective league.
- Note: St. Louis and Houston finished the season tied, and Houston was awarded the division title due to winning their season series.
- ** The Seattle Mariners break the single season record for most wins in the AL with 116.

== Events ==
=== January ===
- January 16 – Outfielders Dave Winfield and Kirby Puckett are elected to the Baseball Hall of Fame in their first year on the ballot.
- January 22 – World Series standout Tommie Agee dies of a cardiac arrest in Manhattan at the age of 58. As the New York Mets center fielder, the 1966 AL Rookie of the Year made two memorable catches (saving possibly five runs) and hit a home run in a 5–0 Game Three victory over the Baltimore Orioles in the 1969 Fall Classic.
- January 23 – The Northern League announced that it had awarded a franchise to Northwest Sports Ventures, later to be named the Gary SouthShore RailCats.
- January 26 – Alex Rodriguez signs as a free agent with the Texas Rangers. The ten-year contract worth $252 million is the most lucrative contract in sports history. The deal is worth $63 million more than the second-richest baseball deal.

=== February ===
- February 8 – The Dominican Republic defeats Mexico 5–3 to take its fourth Caribbean World Series title in five years.
- February 11 – Three Rivers Stadium, the home of the Pittsburgh Pirates from 1970 to 2000, is imploded before thousands of onlookers. The team plays in new PNC Park this season.
- February 20 – Atlanta Braves center fielder Andruw Jones wins a record $8.2 million contract in salary arbitration. The previous record of $7.25 million was set in 2000 by New York Yankees reliever Mariano Rivera.

=== March ===
- March 6 – Second baseman Bill Mazeroski and Negro league pitcher Hilton Smith are elected to the Hall of Fame by the Veterans Committee.
- March 8 – The Baltimore Orioles announce that Albert Belle is "totally disabled and unable to perform as a major league baseball player" due to a severe case of degenerative arthritis of the right hip.
- March 23 – A panel of veteran baseball writers, historians and executives selects a roster of the 100 Greatest Cleveland Indians Players, as part of the club's 100th Anniversary Celebration.
- March 24 – One of Major League Baseball's more bizarre moments occurs in a Spring training game between the San Francisco Giants and the Arizona Diamondbacks. Randy Johnson is on the mound and pitches as a bird flies between the mound and the plate. The ball hits the bird in an "explosion of feathers" that kills the bird. The official call is a "no pitch".

=== April ===
- April 4:
  - Hideo Nomo hurls a 3–0 no-hitter against the Baltimore Orioles in his Boston Red Sox debut. It is Nomo's second career no-hitter, making him the fourth pitcher in history to hurl one in both the NL and the AL. It is also the earliest no-hitter, by date, in major league history, as well as the first by a Red Sox pitcher since Dave Morehead's gem in 1965.
  - Carlos Delgado hits three home runs helping the Toronto Blue Jays beat the Tampa Bay Devil Rays 11–8.
- April 6 – The Milwaukee Brewers defeat the Cincinnati Reds 5–4 in the first game played at Miller Park in Milwaukee.
- April 9 – The Pittsburgh Pirates lose to the Cincinnati Reds 8–2 in the first game played at PNC Park in Pittsburgh.
- April 12 – José Hernández of the Milwaukee Brewers hits two home runs and ties a team record with seven runs batted in, as Milwaukee defeats the Houston Astros, 12–4.
- April 14 – A major league record is set as 11 one-run games are played, breaking the mark of 10 set in 1967. With a 1–0 win over the New York Mets, the Cincinnati Reds set the modern-day National League record with their 175th consecutive game without being shut out, breaking the mark of 174 set by the 1992–93 Philadelphia Phillies.
- April 17 – Barry Bonds of the San Francisco Giants becomes the 17th player in major league history to hit 500 career home runs.
- April 20 – For the second time in the month, Carlos Delgado hits three home runs in a game, including his 200th career homer, leading the Toronto Blue Jays to a 12–4 victory over the Kansas City Royals.
- April 22 – Pedro Astacio pitched a two-hitter, striking out eight and walking one, to guide the Colorado Rockies to a 2–1 victory over the Arizona Diamondbacks at Bank One Ballpark. Astacio is lifted in the ninth inning, after allowing one single and hitting his fourth hitter of the game, tying a Major League Baseball record for the most hit by pitches in a single game. The previously was Orel Hershiser, who did it on April 19, 2000. Larry Walker belted a solo home run and Jeff Cirillo added an RBI-single to back the 50th career win of Astacio with Colorado, becoming the first franchise pitcher to reach that level.
- April 26 – Luis Gonzalez of the Arizona Diamondbacks hits his home runs No. 12 and 13, tying Ken Griffey Jr. for the most homers in Major League history for the month of April. This record has since been passed by the St. Louis Cardinals' Albert Pujols and the New York Yankees' Alex Rodriguez, who respectively hit 14 home runs during April in 2006 and 2007.

=== May ===
- May 1 – Deion Sanders makes his return to Major League Baseball with the Cincinnati Reds and goes 3–3, including a three-run home run off of Éric Gagné in a win over the Los Angeles Dodgers.
- May 5 – The Chicago Cubs defeat the Los Angeles Dodgers 20–1. It is the 15th time since 1900 that Chicago scores 20 runs in a game, and the 11th time they do it at Wrigley Field.
- May 8 – Randy Johnson of the Arizona Diamondbacks records twenty strikeouts in a game against the Cincinnati Reds. While all strikeouts come before the end of the ninth inning, the game goes to extra innings, with the Diamondbacks winning. Johnson is the first left-handed pitcher to record 20 strikeouts in a game, and is the first to do so without winning the game.
- May 12:
  - A. J. Burnett of the Florida Marlins pitches an unlikely no-hitter, overcoming nine bases on balls to lead Florida over the San Diego Padres, 3–0, at Qualcomm Stadium. It is the second no-hitter of the season and the 228th overall in the major leagues. Burnett strikes out seven and hits a batter, but his nine walks represents a record in a nine-inning no-hitter game. He is only surpassed by Jim Maloney, who struck out 11 but gave up 10 walks in a ten-inning no-hitter on August 19, 1965, as the Cincinnati Reds defeated the Chicago Cubs, 1–0, at Wrigley Field.
  - Carlos Delgado hits his 204th home run in a Toronto Blue Jays uniform, surpassing Joe Carter as the all-time Blue Jays career leader in homers.
  - Gary Sheffield of the Los Angeles Dodgers becomes the first player in major league history to win three 1–0 games in a season with a home run, when he solos to beat the Atlanta Braves 1–0. He also supplied the only scoring by homering on April 2 versus Milwaukee, and on May 7 against Florida.
- May 16:
  - Rickey Henderson leads off with a home run, extending his major league record for leadoff homers to 79. This equals the total for the #2 and #3 players on the list, Brady Anderson (44) and Bobby Bonds (35).
  - Sammy Sosa hits his 400th career home run.
- May 25 – Hideo Nomo of the Boston Red Sox tosses a one-hitter and strikes out 14 in a 4–0 win over the Toronto Blue Jays. Nomo faces one batter over the minimum of 27, giving up a leadoff double in the fourth inning to Shannon Stewart. Previously, Nomo had tossed a no-hit game on April 4 against the Orioles.
- May 28 – Collecting five singles and a three-run home run, Los Angeles Dodgers catcher Paul Lo Duca goes 6-for-6 against the Colorado Rockies to tie an NL record for hits in an extra-inning game.
- May 29 – The Arizona Diamondbacks outlast the San Francisco Giants, 1–0, in an 18-inning marathon at Pacific Bell Park.

=== June ===
- June 8 – Damion Easley of the Detroit Tigers hits for the cycle against the Milwaukee Brewers, becoming the first American League player to accomplish this feat in interleague play.
- June 16 – John Olerud of the Seattle Mariners hits for the cycle against the San Diego Padres, joining Bob Watson as the only players in major league history to hit for the cycle in both leagues.
- June 17 – Blake Stein of the Kansas City Royals strikes out eight straight batters, and 11 in 5 2/3 innings, but Kansas City loses to the Milwaukee Brewers, 5–2. Only Nolan Ryan (twice), Ron Davis and Roger Clemens have struck out eight in a row in the American League. Tom Seaver holds the major league record with 10 consecutive strikeouts, which was set in 1970.

=== July ===
- July 10 – The American League defeats the National League 4–1 in the All–Star Game. Cal Ripken Jr. playing in his final All-Star Game thrills the crowd by hitting a home run and is selected the MVP. Derek Jeter and Magglio Ordóñez also homer for the American League. A memorable moment occurs when Alex Rodriguez vacates his position as shortstop to Ripken for one inning as Ripken had played at shortstop for most of his career.
- July 13 – Mike Piazza hits his 300th career home run.
- July 18:
  - Randy Johnson comes into a game as a reliever and strikes out 16 Padres batters, an all-time record for a relief appearance, while allowing just one hit over seven innings.
  - An Enron Field first: Jeff Bagwell of the Houston Astros hits for the cycle in a 17-11 Astros win over the St. Louis Cardinals.

=== August ===
- August 5 – The Cleveland Indians tie a Major League Baseball record by erasing a 12-run Seattle lead to defeat the Seattle Mariners.
- August 6 – At Fenway Park, Scott Hatteberg of the Boston Red Sox becomes the first player to hit into a triple play and hit a grand slam home run in the same game. In the fourth inning of the Red Sox' victory over the Texas Rangers, Hatteberg lines out to shortstop Alex Rodriguez, who then throws to second, where Randy Velarde steps on the base to double up Brian Daubach, then tags out Chris Stynes (who runs from first) for the third out. Two innings later, Hatteberg gets revenge by homering with Troy O'Leary, Daubach and Stynes on base ahead of him; the grand slam puts the Red Sox ahead for the final 10–7 score.
- August 9 – Sammy Sosa hits 3 home runs in a game.
- August 11 – Barry Bonds hits his 50th home run of the season to lead the San Francisco Giants to a 9–4 victory over the Chicago Cubs. No other player reaches 50 home runs faster than Bonds.
- August 15 – For the first time in major league history, four pitchers from Venezuela combine to win their respective starts the same day: Freddy García, of the Seattle Mariners, against the Boston Red Sox, 6–2; Kelvim Escobar, of the Toronto Blue Jays, over the Oakland Athletics, 5–2; Giovanni Carrara of the Los Angeles Dodgers, against the Montreal Expos, 13–1; and Omar Daal, in a Philadelphia Phillies victory over the Milwaukee Brewers, 8–6.
- August 22 – Sammy Sosa hits 3 home runs, helping Chicago Cubs beat the Milwaukee Brewers 16–3.
- August 23:
  - With his 300th strikeout today, Randy Johnson becomes the first pitcher to strike out 300 or more batters in four consecutive seasons.
  - At Shea Stadium, Jason Jennings of the Colorado Rockies shuts out the New York Mets 10–0 and helps his own cause by homering in the same game, the home run coming in the 9th inning off Donne Wall for the game's final run. Jennings becomes the first pitcher to pitch a shutout and hit a home run in the same game in his Major League debut.
- August 25 – Bernie Williams hits his 200th career home run, helping the New York Yankees beat the Anaheim Angels 7–5.
- August 26 – Sammy Sosa hits his 50th and 51st home runs to power the Chicago Cubs to a 6–1 victory over the St. Louis Cardinals. He joins Mark McGwire and Babe Ruth as the only major leaguers with four 50-homer seasons.

=== September ===
- September 1 – Rafael Palmeiro of the Texas Rangers collects his 100th run batted in. He becomes only the fourth major league player with seven consecutive seasons with at least 35 home runs and 100 RBI. This is the eighth time in his career he has at least 100 RBI. He joins some elite company; Jimmie Foxx has nine such consecutive seasons, and Babe Ruth and Sammy Sosa both have seven.
- September 2 – Mike Mussina of the New York Yankees comes within one strike of a perfect game against the Boston Red Sox at Fenway Park. He retires the first 26 Red Sox hitters in order before outfielder Carl Everett lines a base hit to left center field to break up the perfect game and no hitter. Mussina settles for a one-hitter in a 1-0 Yankees win.
- September 3 – Bud Smith of the St. Louis Cardinals becomes the 16th rookie in modern history to throw a no-hitter and the second to do it to the San Diego Padres this season in the Cardinals' 4–0 win. Smith makes his 11th career start.
- September 5 – Roger Clemens becomes the second pitcher in major league history to win 19 of his first 20 decisions, leading the New York Yankees over the Toronto Blue Jays 4–3.
- September 6 – Barry Bonds of the San Francisco Giants becomes the fifth player in major league history to hit 60 home runs in a season during a game against the Arizona Diamondbacks. He joins Babe Ruth, Roger Maris, Mark McGwire and Sammy Sosa. Bonds, who is the oldest to join this elite group, reaches the historic plateau the quickest, needing only 141 games to reach the milestone.
- September 9 – Barry Bonds of the San Francisco Giants hits 3 home runs to help the Giants beat the Colorado Rockies 9–4 in 11 innings. He is now 7 home runs shy of tying Mark McGwire's single season record of 70 set in 1998.
- September 11 – Due to terrorist attacks in New York, Washington, and Pennsylvania, all future MLB games are postponed until further notice.
- September 12 – Minor League Baseball cancels the remainder of the 2001 playoff series. All leaders in their series are deemed champions, and those series which do not start or tie have had all teams participating named co-champions.
- September 13 – Commissioner Bud Selig announces that baseball resumes playing on September 17, six days after the 9/11 attacks.
- September 21 – In the first sporting event in New York City since the 9/11 terrorist attacks, Mike Piazza hits a dramatic 2-run home run in the 8th inning to give the Mets a 3–2 win over the Atlanta Braves. Before the game the 2 rival teams shake hands to show that America is a country united.
- September 23 – Sammy Sosa hits three home runs again.
- September 24 – Pittsburgh Pirates rookie Craig Wilson ties the major league record for pinch-hit home runs in a season by hitting his seventh in the Pirates' 7–6 win over the Chicago Cubs. Dave Hansen of the Los Angeles Dodgers set the mark last season.
- September 25 – Jeromy Burnitz and Richie Sexson of the Milwaukee Brewers become the first teammates to each hit 3 home runs in the same game as they beat the Arizona Diamondbacks 9–4 at Bank One Ballpark.
- September 27:
  - Sammy Sosa of the Chicago Cubs hits a home run and carries a small American flag around the bases in a 6–5 loss to the Houston Astros.
  - Randy Johnson ties the Major League record for double-digit strikeout games in a season as he records his 23rd of the season.
- September 28 – Alex Rodriguez of the Texas Rangers hits his 50th home run in an 11–2 victory over the Anaheim Angels and becomes the 20th player in major league history to hit 50 homers in a season.

=== October ===
- October 2 – At Wrigley Field, Sammy Sosa hits his 60th home run of the season off Lance Davis of the Cincinnati Reds. He becomes the first player in Major League history with three 60-home run seasons.
- October 4:
  - Rickey Henderson hits a home run to become the major leagues' all-time career runs scored leader with 2,246, passing Ty Cobb.
  - Tim Raines plays left field and his son Tim Jr. plays center in the Baltimore Orioles' 5–4 loss to the Boston Red Sox. They become the second father-son duo to play in the same game, matching the feat turned by Ken Griffey and Ken Jr.
- October 5:
  - Barry Bonds hits his 71st and 72nd home runs of the year to set a new major league single-season mark in the San Francisco Giants' 11–10 loss to the Los Angeles Dodgers.
  - Baltimore Orioles lose to the Boston Red Sox 7–5, as Cal Ripken Jr. becomes the seventh player in major league history to play in 3,000 career games.
- October 6:
  - The Seattle Mariners beat the Texas Rangers 1–0, setting the American league record to 116 wins in a regular season and tying the major league mark set by the Chicago Cubs in 1906.
  - Lenny Harris breaks Manny Mota's all-time mark for pinch hits with the 151st of his career as the New York Mets defeat the Montreal Expos 4–0.
  - Tony Gwynn doubles off of the Colorado Rockies' Gabe White. It is the 3,141st and final hit of his career. His career batting average of .338 is, at the time of his retirement, the eleventh highest since 1901. It is the second highest of any player to play since 1950 (Ted Williams' .344), It is also the highest of any player to play entirely in the last 40 years of the 20th century.
  - Cal Ripken Jr. goes 0-for-3 in the final game of his major league career as the Baltimore Orioles lose to the Boston Red Sox 5–1.
- October 7:
  - Rickey Henderson gets the 3,000th hit of his career, as the San Diego Padres lose to the Colorado Rockies. The game is the final one of Tony Gwynn's career. Meanwhile, Larry Walker wins his third NL batting title in three years at .350. Walker and Rockies teammate Todd Helton (.336) become the first teammates to finish 1-2 since Blue Jays John Olerud (.363), Paul Molitor (.332) and Roberto Alomar (.326) were the top three in 1993.
  - Albert Pujols ties Emmet "Snags" Heidrick (1899) for most hits by a St. Louis Cardinals rookie when he makes his 194th.
  - Barry Bonds extends his major-league record with his 73rd home run of the season. He finishes the year with a .863 slugging percentage to break Babe Ruth's all-time single-season record set in 1920.
  - In a day of records, the Chicago Cubs lose to the Pittsburgh Pirates in their final game of the season, 4–3. They become the first team in major league history to not allow an opposing pitcher to throw a complete game against them all season. Sammy Sosa closes out 2001 with his 64th home run in his final at-bat of the game and sets a new franchise record with 103 extra base hits, six more than Hack Wilson (1930). Sosa also finishes with another franchise record of 425 total bases (the seventh best all-time total), two ahead of Wilson. His 160 RBI are the highest total in the NL since Chuck Klein posted 170 in 1930; Sosa's RBI total for the past four years also breaks Klein's four-year mark set in 1929–32. To finish out the record day, five Cubs pitchers combine for 12 strikeouts as the staff sets a major league record with 1,344 strikeouts. The New York Yankees do the same, setting an AL mark with 1,266 strikeouts.
- October 12 – Finishing his fifteenth full season as Minnesota Twins manager, Tom Kelly announces his resignation, citing "burn out". Before this past season, Kelly hadn't had a winning season since 1992. He'd won the World Series twice, in his first full season in 1987 and again in 1991. He leaves with a career record of 1,140–1,244.
- October 30 – The World Series comes to Yankee Stadium. President George W. Bush throws out the ceremonial first pitch.

=== November ===
- November 1 – The New York Yankees pull off two incredible comebacks. With the Arizona Diamondbacks leading 3–1 with 2 outs in the 9th inning of Game 4 of the 2001 World Series, Tino Martinez hits a game-tying 2-run home run. One inning later (at 12:04 ET) Derek Jeter hits a walk-off home run to win Game 4, while fans wave a banner which says "Mr. November". Later that night in Game 5, with the Yankees trailing 2–0 in the 9th inning with 2 outs, Scott Brosius hits a 2-run game-tying home run to tie that game at 2. The Yankees win 3–2 and take a 3–2 series lead.
- November 4 – The Arizona Diamondbacks win the first World Series of their four-year existence with a come-from-behind 3–2 win over the New York Yankees. Mariano Rivera, considered by many to be the best closer in postseason history, begins the bottom of the 9th inning with a 1-run lead, but is unable to protect it, allowing two runs, including a game-winning RBI single by Luis González. Randy Johnson gets the win in relief and shares World Series MVP honors with Curt Schilling.
- November 6 – Major League Baseball owners vote 28–2 to contract two teams for the following season, with the Minnesota Twins and Montreal Expos—the teams expected to be eliminated—casting the dissenting votes.
- November 11 – Mark McGwire announces his retirement. His 583 career home runs place him fifth on the all-time list.
- November 12:
  - Albert Pujols, just one year after playing Class-A baseball, hits a .329 batting average with 37 home runs and 130 RBI and is named the National League Rookie of the Year by the BBWAA. The St. Louis Cardinals freshman sets NL rookie marks in RBI, total bases (360) and extra base hits (88), and falls one home run shy of tying the NL rookie record of 38 established by Frank Robinson in 1956 as a member of the Cincinnati Reds.
  - Seattle Mariners outfielder Ichiro Suzuki, who leads the American League with a .350 batting average, is named Rookie of the Year by the BBWAA.
- November 27 – The major league owners vote unanimously to extend baseball commissioner Bud Selig's contract through 2006.
- November 30 – Major League Baseball's plan to contract by two teams next season is put into jeopardy by Minnesota courts. The state's Supreme Court refuses to grant the request for a speedy review of the appeal of the injunction which forces the Twins to play in 2002, and the appellate court sets the hearing for December 27, a date many believe is too late to make the elimination of two teams a reality. Unsure of their future, the Expos sign a one-year lease to play their home games of the 2002 season at Olympic Stadium. Due to the threat of being eliminated because of the proposed contraction, the agreement gives the Expos the right to unilaterally cancel the contract.

=== December ===
- December 1 – The New York Mets sign pitcher Satoru Komiyama to a one-year contract. A seven-time All-Star in Japan and former Chiba Lotte Marines member, Komiyama will compile a 0–3 record with 33 strikeouts and a 5.61 ERA in 2002, his only major league season.
- December 6 – Major League Baseball reportedly gives John Henry permission to sell the Florida Marlins to Montreal Expos owner Jeffrey Loria. The Expos are taken over by MLB, who owns the franchise until 2006 after moving it to Washington the previous year.
- December 20 – The limited partners of the Boston Red Sox vote unanimously to sell the team to a group led by Florida Marlins owner John Henry and former San Diego Padres owner Tom Werner. The $660 million price, plus an assumption of $40 in debt, doubles the record price for a baseball team.

== Movies ==
- 61* (TV)
- Hardball
- Summer Catch

== Births ==
=== January ===
- January 4 – DJ Herz
- January 5 – Daniel Espino
- January 5 – Cody Freeman
- January 5 – Vaughn Grissom
- January 5 – Eric Pardinho
- January 6 – Luis Peralta
- January 9 – Tyler Owens
- January 10 – Connor Prielipp
- January 13 – Brayan Rocchio
- January 26 – Zach Maxwell
- January 26 – Colby Thomas
- January 31 – Zach Neto

=== February ===
- February 5 – Cam Schlittler
- February 12 – Victor Scott II
- February 14 – Mitch Farris
- February 14 – Brooks Lee
- February 14 – Emiliano Teodo
- February 17 – Jorge Barrosa
- February 21 – Porter Hodge
- February 21 – Dalton Rushing
- February 21 – David Sandlin
- February 26 – Trevor McDonald

=== March ===
- March 1 – Wander Franco
- March 3 – Gabriel Rincones Jr.
- March 7 – Michael Harris II
- March 9 – Jorbit Vivas
- March 11 – Jack Brannigan
- March 16 – Cooper Hjerpe
- March 20 – Taj Bradley
- March 20 – José Tena
- March 26 – Félix Reyes
- March 28 – Drake Baldwin
- March 29 – Alex Cook
- March 30 – Marc Church

=== April ===
- April 4 – Orion Kerkering
- April 4 – Ronny Mauricio
- April 10 – Everson Pereira
- April 19 – Jordan Beck
- April 20 – Adam Mazur
- April 28 – Anthony Volpe

=== May ===
- May 1 – Ben Peoples
- May 4 – Connor Phillips
- May 6 – Rikuu Nishida
- May 9 – Eiberson Castellano
- May 9 – Matthew Lugo
- May 9 – Peyton Pallette
- May 12 – Gavin Collyer
- May 13 – José Rodríguez
- May 14 – Spencer Jones
- May 14 – Daniel Susac
- May 17 – Leo Jimenez

=== June ===
- June 2 – Keoni Cavaco
- June 4 – Julian Aguiar
- June 5 – Logan Evans
- June 6 – Ben Ross
- June 8 – Victor Mederos
- June 8 – Blade Tidwell
- June 9 – Alex McFarlane
- June 18 – William Kempner
- June 21 – Brandan Bidois
- June 23 – Jake Bloss
- June 24 – Mo'ne Davis
- June 24 – Luis Mey
- June 25 – Eddy Yean
- June 26 – Sterlin Thompson
- June 28 – Bryce Hubbart
- June 28 – Jakob Marsee
- June 28 – Blake Walston
- June 29 – Gunnar Henderson

=== July ===
- July 4 – Junior Pérez
- July 5 – Omar Martínez
- July 10 – Anthony Nunez
- July 12 – Thomas Harrington
- July 15 – Jhonkensy Noel
- July 17 – Brycen Mautz
- July 18 – José Rodríguez
- July 19 – Jimmy Crooks
- July 23 – Nate Furman
- July 23 – Chase Meidroth
- July 24 – Nolan McLean
- July 26 – Tsung-Che Cheng
- July 30 – Carlos Duran
- July 30 – Justin Martinez

=== August ===
- August 1 – Ezequiel Tovar
- August 2 – Scott Bandura
- August 3 – Darell Hernáiz
- August 3 – Max Rajcic
- August 4 – Jonah Cox
- August 6 – Jared Jones
- August 11 – Dylan Beavers
- August 12 – Kyle Harrison
- August 13 – Mason Fluharty
- August 14 – Colt Keith
- August 15 – Robert Hassell III
- August 18 – Mick Abel
- August 20 – Cade Horton
- August 21 – Luinder Avila
- August 22 – Alexander Cornielle
- August 22 – Gabriel Hughes
- August 24 – Alex Freeland
- August 29 – Drew Romo
- August 30 – Hayden Birdsong

=== September ===
- September 1 – Andrew Morris
- September 8 – Víctor Mesa Jr.
- September 9 – Troy Taylor
- September 10 – Marco Luciano
- September 10 – Agustín Ramírez
- September 19 – Samuel Aldegheri
- September 24 – Juan Brito
- September 25 – Ty Johnson
- September 27 – Luis Gastélum

=== October ===
- October 5 – Jack Dougherty
- October 8 – Chase DeLauter
- October 8 – Joey Estes
- October 9 – Yohandy Morales
- October 16 – Dax Fulton
- October 16 – Noelvi Marte
- October 26 – Chase Dollander
- October 28 – CJ Kayfus

=== November ===
- November 2 – Brett Callahan
- November 3 – Roki Sasaki
- November 6 – Matt Shaw
- November 11 – Kyren Paris
- November 15 – Wyatt Langford
- November 19 – Francisco Álvarez
- November 19 – Orelvis Martínez
- November 24 – Tyler Soderstrom
- November 27 – Carlos Rodríguez
- November 28 – José Fermín

=== December ===
- December 3 – Victor Bericoto
- December 10 – Coby Mayo
- December 12 – Zac Veen
- December 15 – Jairo Iriarte

== Deaths ==
=== January ===
- January 3 – Alex Sabo, 90, backup catcher for the Washington Senators in the 1936 and 1937 seasons.
- January 6 – Tom Poholsky, 71, pitcher who played for the St. Louis Cardinals and Chicago Cubs in a span of six seasons from 1950 to 1957.
- January 6 – Tot Pressnell, 94, who pitched from 1938 through 1942 for the Brooklyn Dodgers and Chicago Cubs.
- January 8 – Bert Hodges, 83, third baseman for the 1942 Philadelphia Phillies.
- January 14 – Joe Zapustas, 93, Latvian-born outfielder who appeared in two games for the 1933 Philadelphia Athletics.
- January 19 – Johnny Babich, 87, pitcher for the Brooklyn Dodgers, Boston Bees and Philadelphia Athletics during five seasons between 1934 and 1941.
- January 22 – Tommie Agee, 58, All-Star center fielder and two-time Gold Glove winner, who played from 1962 through 1973 for the Cleveland Indians, Chicago White Sox, New York Mets, Houston Astros and St. Louis Cardinals, winning the 1966 AL Rookie of the Year; best remembered for two outstanding catches in Game 3 of the 1969 World Series that helped the Mets win the World Championship title over the high favored Baltimore Orioles.
- January 28 – Curt Blefary, 57, left fielder who played for the Baltimore Orioles, Houston Astros, New York Yankees, Oakland Athletics and San Diego Padres in eight seasons spanning 1965–1972, winning both the American League Rookie of the Year and The Sporting News Rookie of the Year awards in 1965; member of the Orioles team that won the 1966 World Series over the Los Angeles Dodgers.

=== February ===
- February 1 – Sam Harshaney, 90, backup catcher for the St. Louis Browns from 1937 to 1940.
- February 5 – Jerry McQuaig, 89, outfielder for the 1934 Philadelphia Athletics.
- February 16 – Bob Buhl, 72, All-Star pitcher for the Milwaukee Braves, Chicago Cubs and Philadelphia Phillies from 1953 to 1967, who posted a 166–133 record and a 3.52 ERA in 457 games, while leading National League pitchers with a .720 winning percentage in 1957.
- February 18 – Eddie Mathews, 69, Hall of Fame third baseman for the Braves in Boston, Milwaukee and Atlanta, who retired with 512 home runs, sixth most in history, hitting 40 homers four times and leading NL twice, while hitting .300 or more three times, recording 100 runs eight times and five 100-RBI seasons; a fine defensive player, Matthews set major league records with 2,181 games and 4,323 assists at third base, setting a NL mark with 369 double plays; appeared on the first cover of Sports Illustrated in 1954; was manager of the Braves in 1974 when former teammate Hank Aaron broke the all-time career home run record.
- February 18 – Butch Wensloff, 85, pitcher who played from 1943 to 1947 with the New York Yankees and for the Cleveland Indians in 1948.
- February 20 – Bill Rigney, 83, All-Star infielder (1948) who played for the New York Giants from 1946 to 1953 and appeared in the 1951 World Series; as a manager between 1956 and 1976, he was the last pilot of the Giants in New York and their first in San Francisco, the first manager in history of the MLB Los Angeles Angels franchise, and guided the Minnesota Twins to the 1970 AL West Division title.
- February 24 – Phil Collier, 75, sportswriter for the San Diego Union-Tribune, while covering the Dodgers, Angels and Padres from 1958 to 1999.
- February 25 – Bitsy Mott, 82, backup infielder for the 1946 Philadelphia Phillies, who also worked later as the personal security guard for rock-and-roll star Elvis Presley.

=== March ===
- March 5 – Leo Thomas, 77, first baseman who played from 1950 to 1952 with the St. Louis Browns and Chicago White Sox.
- March 7 – Janice O'Hara, 82, one of the original players to join the All-American Girls Professional Baseball League for its inaugural season in 1943.
- March 12 – Bill Reeder, 79, relief pitcher who appeared in 21 contests for the 1949 St. Louis Cardinals.
- March 15 – Fern Battaglia, 70, infielder for the Battle Creek Belles of the All-American Girls Professional Baseball League.
- March 20 – Luis Alvarado, 52, Puerto Rican infielder who played for the Boston Red Sox, Chicago White Sox, St. Louis Cardinals, Cleveland Indians, New York Mets and Detroit Tigers in a span of seven season from 1968 to 1977.
- March 22 – Newt Kimball, 85, relief pitcher who played for the Chicago Cubs, St. Louis Cardinals, Brooklyn Dodgers and Philadelphia Phillies over part of six seasons from 1937 to 1943.
- March 31 – Brian Cole, 22, outfielder in the New York Mets minor league system and one of the top prospects in baseball, who died in a car accident during spring training.

=== April ===
- April 1 – Nelson Burbrink, 79, catcher for the 1955 St. Louis Cardinals; later a scout for multiple clubs and scouting director for the New York Mets.
- April 1 – Jo-Jo Moore, 92, left fielder who played his entire 1,335-game career (1930–1941) with New York Giants; six-time National League All-Star and member of 1933 World Series champs; batted .298 lifetime with 1,615 hits.
- April 2 – Lloyd Gearhart, 77, first baseman for the 1947 New York Giants, and later a longtime player-manager for the Atlanta Crackers minor league team.
- April 9 – Willie Stargell, 61, Hall of Fame and seven-time All-Star left fielder and first baseman, feared power hitter, and a leader on the field and in the clubhouse during his 21 seasons with the Pittsburgh Pirates from 1962 to 1982, who hit a slash line of .282/.360/.529 with 475 home runs and 1540 RBI, leading the Pirates to World Series titles in 1971 and 1979, while winning the National League MVP Award, the NL Championship Series MVP Award and the World Series MVP Award in 1979, becoming the first player to collect all three awards in a Major League Baseball season.
- April 16 – Hank Riebe, 79, catcher for the Detroit Tigers in four seasons between 1942 and 1949, as well as a highly decorated World War II veteran.
- April 21 – Sandy Ullrich, 79, Cuban pitcher for the Washington Senators from 1944 to 1945.
- April 21 – Hal White, 82, pitcher for the Detroit Tigers, St. Louis Browns and St. Louis Cardinals over 12 seasons from 1941 to 1954, who earned shutouts in his first two major league starts, and later worked as a coach and scout.

=== May ===
- May 3 – Hank Schmulbach, 76, who was used as a pinch runner by the St. Louis Browns for one game in the 1943 season.
- May 7 – Dick Kimble, 85, shortstop for the 1945 Washington Senators.
- May 17 – Ike Brown, 59, colorful utilityman for the Detroit Tigers from 1969 through 1974, who was one of the last alumni of the Negro leagues, along with Hank Aaron and Willie Mays, to be still active in the Major Leagues.
- May 19 – Joe Lovitto, 50, center fielder who played 306 games for the Texas Rangers from 1972 through 1975.
- May 20 – Bob Keely, 91, rarely used catcher for the St. Louis Cardinals from 1944 to 1945, who later served as a coach for 12 seasons from 1946 through 1957 for the Boston/Milwaukee Braves.
- May 20 – Bud Thomas, 91, pitcher for the Washington Senators, Philadelphia Athletics and Detroit Tigers in a span of seven seasons from 1932 to 1941, who faced Babe Ruth twice, striking him out the second time, and surrendered the first major league home run ever hit by Boston Red Sox legend Ted Williams.
- May 21 – Mel Hoderlein, 77, utility infielder for the Boston Red Sox and Washington Senators in four seasons from 1951 to 1954.
- May 21 – Stuart Meyer, 67, Anheuser-Busch executive who was president of the St. Louis Cardinals between 1992 and 1994.
- May 22 – Ralph Hamner, 84, pitcher who played from 1946 through 1949 with the Chicago White Sox and Chicago Cubs.

=== June ===
- June 1 – Nancy Warren, 79, All-American Girls Professional Baseball League All-Star pitcher and member of the 1954 champion team.
- June 2 – Jimmy Bragan, 72, MLB coach for the Cincinnati Reds, Montreal Expos and Milwaukee Brewers for eight years between 1967 and 1977 and a longtime scout; president of Double-A Southern League from 1981 to 1994; brother of Bobby Bragan.
- June 2 – Gene Woodling, 78, All-Star left fielder who played for seven different teams in a span of 17 seasons from 1943 to 1962, most notably with the New York Yankees, winning five World Series rings with them while hitting a .318/.442/.529 slash line and scoring 21 runs in 26 Series games.
- June 4 – John Corriden, 83, pinch runner who made one appearance for the Brooklyn Dodgers in the 1946 season; son of longtime MLB coach Red Corriden.
- June 6 – Ford Garrison, 85, outfielder who played from 1943 through 1946 for the Boston Red Sox and Philadelphia Athletics; later served as a coach on the staff of Cincinnati Redlegs manager Rogers Hornsby in 1953.
- June 11 – Lou Lombardo, 72, pitcher who played in two games for the New York Giants in 1948.
- June 15 – Marcelino Solis, 70, Mexican left-handed pitcher who appeared in 15 games in 1958 for the Chicago Cubs.
- June 16 – Wally Hood, 75, pitcher for the 1949 New York Yankees.
- June 16 – Sam Jethroe, 84, All-Star outfielder in the Negro leagues who broke the color line in Boston as the first black player on the Braves franchise in 1950; as winner of the National League Rookie of the Year Award at age 32, he remains the oldest player to receive this honor.
- June 20 – Bob Keegan, 80, All-Star pitcher who played from 1953 to 1958 for the Chicago White Sox, going 40–36 with a 3.66 ERA in 135 appearances, including a no-hitter over the Washington Senators on August 20, 1957.
- June 25 – John LeRoy, 26, relief pitcher for the 1997 Atlanta Braves who earned a victory in his only MLB game on September 26.

=== July ===
- July 9 – Al Lary, 72, pitcher who played for the Chicago Cubs in a span of three seasons between 1954 and 1962; brother of Frank Lary.
- July 10 – Tony Criscola, 86, outfielder who played from 1942 through 1944 for the St. Louis Cardinals and Cincinnati Reds, as well as one of many ballplayers who only appeared in the major leagues during World War II.
- July 16 – John Dagenhard, 84, pitcher for the 1943 Boston Braves.
- July 17 – Elon Hogsett, 97, relief pitcher who played for the Detroit Tigers, St. Louis Browns and Washington Senators in 11 seasons (1929–1938, 1944) appearing in two World Series with the Tigers, winning a championship in 1935.
- July 18 – Barry Shetrone, 63, backup outfielder who played for the Baltimore Orioles and Washington Senators in part of five seasons from 1959 to 1963.
- July 28 – John Easton, 68, utility man who played for the Philadelphia Phillies in the 1955 and 1959 seasons.
- July 30 – Thelma Grambo, 77, Canadian catcher who played in the All-American Girls Professional Baseball League during the 1946 season.

=== August ===
- August 10 – Lou Boudreau, 84, Hall of Fame and eight-time All-Star shortstop, who won both the American League MVP Award and the MLB Player of the Year Award in 1948 while leading the Cleveland Indians to the World Series title as a player-manager, the last big leaguer to do so; won the AL League batting crown with a .327 average in 1944 and led the league in AL three times; skippered Cleveland from 1942 to 1950, then managed the Boston Red Sox, Kansas City Athletics and Chicago Cubs in all or part of seven years between 1952 and 1960; longtime member of Cubs' radio broadcast team.
- August 10 – Ramón Monzant, 68, Venezuelan pitcher who played for the Giants in New York and San Francisco during six seasons from 1954 to 1959, whose best performance came in 1956 in an 8–1 complete game victory over the Philadelphia Phillies, allowing only a one-out, first inning single to Del Ennis which cost him a no-hitter game.
- August 13 – Jim Hughes, 78, pitcher who played from 1952 through 1957 with the Brooklyn Dodgers, Chicago Cubs and Chicago White Sox, being also a member of four National League pennant-winning Dodgers clubs, in 1952–1953 and 1955–1956, though he played in only the 1953 World Series.
- August 23 – Shirley Kleinhans, 72, All-American Girls Professional Baseball League player.
- August 24 – Hank Sauer, 84, two-time All-Star who played for the Cincinnati Reds, Chicago Cubs, St. Louis Cardinals, and New York and San Francisco Giants during 15 seasons spanning 1941–1959; won the 1952 National League Most Valuable Player Award with the Cubs after leading the league with 121 RBI and tying Ralph Kiner for home run title with 37 bombs.
- August 29 – Sid Peterson, 83, pitcher for the 1943 St. Louis Browns.
- August 29 – Eric Tipton, 86, backup left fielder who played with the Philadelphia Athletics from 1939 to 1941, and for the Cincinnati Reds from 1942 to 1945.
- August 29 – Dick Selma, 57, pitcher for six MLB clubs between 1965 and 1974; won first game in the history of the MLB San Diego Padres in 1969 – a 10-inning shutout, 1–0 victory over the Atlanta Braves; a year later, saved 22 games for the 1970 Philadelphia Phillies.
- August 31 – Crash Davis, 82, infielder for the Philadelphia Athletics from 1940 to 1942, whose nickname was given to the Kevin Costner character in the film Bull Durham.

=== September ===
- September 3 – Carl Lindquist, 82, pitcher who played with the Boston Braves in the 1943 and 1944 seasons.
- September 11 – Clem Dreisewerd, 85, pitcher for the Boston Red Sox, St. Louis Browns and New York Giants between 1944 and 1948, who also enjoyed a long and successful minor league career.
- September 11 – Vince Ventura, 84, left fielder for the 1945 Washington Senators.
- September 13 – Jorge Comellas, 84, Cuban pitcher who played for the 1945 Chicago Cubs.
- September 17 – Bubba Church, 77, pitcher who played from 1950 through 1955 for the Philadelphia Phillies, Cincinnati Reds/Redlegs and Chicago Cubs; played a key role in his rookie season for the famed 1950 Whiz Kids Phillies in their fight for the National League pennant.
- September 19 – Bill Stafford, 62, pitcher for the New York Yankees and Kansas City Athletics in eight seasons from 1960 to 1967, winning two World Series rings with the Yankees in 1961 and 1962, and the winning pitcher in Game 3 of the 1962 World Series.
- September 20 – George Archie, 87, corner infielder who played for the Detroit Tigers, Washington Senators and St. Louis Browns in a span of three seasons from 1938 to 1946, another ballplayer whose career was interrupted by the war.
- September 20 – Joe Stephenson, 80, backup catcher for the New York Giants, Chicago Cubs and Chicago White Sox in part of three seasons spanning 1943–1947; later a longtime scout for the Boston Red Sox; father of the MLB pitcher and scout.
- September 25 – Ritter Collett, 80, sports editor and columnist for the Dayton Journal-Herald and Dayton Daily News for over fifty years, who along with Bob Prince and Jim Enright created the Hutch Award in honor of Cincinnati Reds manager Fred Hutchinson, and also received the J. G. Taylor Spink Award distinction in 1991.
- September 25 – John Powers, 72, backup outfielder who played for the Pittsburgh Pirates, Cincinnati Reds, Baltimore Orioles and Cleveland Indians in part of six seasons from 1955 to 1960.
- September 27 – Dick Rozek, 74, relief pitcher who played from 1950 through 1954 for the Cleveland Indians and Philadelphia Athletics.
- September 28 – Jack Maguire, 76, utility man for the New York Giants, Pittsburgh Pirates and St. Louis Browns in part of two seasons from 1950 to 1951.
- September 29 – John Noriega, 57, middle relief pitcher who made 13 appearances for the Cincinnati Reds from 1969 to 1970, including for the Big Red Machine club that clinched the 1970 National League pennant.

=== October ===
- October 5 – Woody Jensen, 94, backup outfielder for the Pittsburgh Pirates during nine seasons from 1931 to 1939, a .324 hitter in his rookie season, whose Major League record of 696 at bats set in 1936 remained intact for 33 seasons until Pirates' outfielder Matty Alou broke it in 1969.
- October 6 – Miguel del Toro, 29, Mexican pitcher for the San Francisco Giants between 1999 and 2000.
- October 10 – Dave Gerard, 65, pitcher whose career extended for ten seasons from 1955 to 1964, including 39 games as a reliever for the Chicago Cubs in 1962.
- October 14 – Ben Sankey, 94, shortstop who played for the Pittsburgh Pirates over parts of three seasons from 1929 to 1931.
- October 18 – Ferris Fain, 80, first baseman for the Philadelphia Athletics, Chicago White Sox, Detroit Tigers and Cleveland Indians in nine seasons from 1947 to 1955, who won consecutive American League batting titles in 1951 and 1952, and was named five times to the All-Star Game.
- October 19 – Joe Murray, 80, pitcher for the 1950 Philadelphia Athletics.
- October 19 – Hugh Mulcahy, 88, All-Star pitcher who played for the Philadelphia Phillies and Pittsburgh Pirates in a span of nine seasons from 1935 to 1947, earning national distinction when he became the very first big leaguer to be drafted into military service before the United States entered World War II.
- October 24 – Bill Mueller, 80, center fielder who played for the Chicago White Sox in the 1942 and 1945 seasons, whose career was interrupted while he served in the military during World War II.
- October 30 – Johnny Lucadello, 82, second baseman who played for the St. Louis Browns and New York Yankees in part of six seasons from 1939 to 1947, another ballplayer whose career was interrupted by the war.

=== November ===
- November 1 – Tom Cheney, 67, pitcher for the St. Louis Cardinals, Pittsburgh Pirates and expansion Washington Senators in a span of eight seasons from 1957 to 1966, as well as a member of the 1960 World Champion Pirates, who is most notable for striking out 21 Baltimore Orioles hitters in a 2–1, 16-inning complete game victory while pitching for the Senators in 1962, setting a record for the most strikeouts in an extra-inning game for a pitcher in MLB history.
- November 1 – H. Gabriel Murphy, 98, 40 percent owner of the Washington Senators/Minnesota Twins franchise from 1950 to 1984 who battled majority owner Calvin Griffith in court in an unsuccessful attempt to keep the team from abandoning the U.S. capital after the 1960 season.
- November 4 – Bob Gillespie, 82, pitcher for the Detroit Tigers, Chicago White Sox and Boston Red Sox over part of four seasons spanning 1944–1950.
- November 11 – Tadashi Sugiura, 66, Hall of Fame NPB pitcher and manager who played for the Nankai Hawks from 1958 to 1970 and managed them from 1986 to 1989.
- November 13 – Frank Messer, 76, play-by-play broadcaster for the Baltimore Orioles (1964–1967), New York Yankees (1968–1985) and Chicago White Sox (1986–1987).
- November 15 – Ernie Stewart, 92, American League umpire who worked 691 games from April 15, 1941, through July 31, 1945, and the 1942 All-Star game; fired by AL for complaining about umpires' working conditions and low salaries.
- November 16 – Tal Abernathy, 80, pitcher who played for the Philadelphia Athletics from 1942 through 1944.
- November 16 – Red Steiner, 86, catcher who played for the Cleveland Indians and Boston Red Sox during the 1945 season.
- November 18 – Mel Deutsch, 86, pitcher for the 1946 Boston Red Sox.
- November 23 – Bo Belinsky, 64, pitcher who enjoyed a 10-win rookie season in 1962 with the Los Angeles Angels, including the first no-hitter on the West Coast, but whose raucous personal life derailed his promising career.
- November 29 – Marcelino López, 58, Cuban left-handed pitcher for six teams in nine seasons from 1963 to 1972, who went 14–13 with a 2.93 earned run average and 122 strikeouts for the Los Angeles Angels to finish second to Curt Blefary in the 1965 American League rookie of the year balloting, and later became one of the most reliable relievers in the Baltimore Orioles bullpen during its 1970 World Championship season.

=== December ===
- December 4 – Eddie Popowski, 88, coach for the Boston Red Sox between 1967 and 1976 who twice served as the Bosox' interim manager; long-time minor league player, skipper and instructor.
- December 18 – Bill Howerton, 80, backup outfielder who appeared in 247 games from 1949 through 1952 for the St. Louis Cardinals, Pittsburgh Pirates and New York Giants.
- December 21 – Karl Winsch, 86, pitcher who played in the Philadelphia Phillies minor league system; also a successful manager in the All-American Girls Professional Baseball League.
- December 22 – Bob Davis, 68, pitcher who played for the Kansas City Athletics in the 1958 and 1960 seasons.
- December 24 – Hank Soar, 87, American League umpire from 1950 to 1971 who worked in five World Series and the 1971 ALCS before becoming a league supervisor; former football player with the New York Giants.
- December 25 – Ramón García, 77, Cuban pitcher for the 1948 Washington Senators.
- December 26 – Tom McBride, 87, outfielder who batted .305 for the 1945 Red Sox, getting six RBI in one inning in August.
- December 27 – John Hoffman, 58, backup catcher who played from 1964 to 1965 for the Houston Colt .45s/Astros.
