= Surprise Saguaros =

Professional baseball team

- Founded in 1992; Surprise, Arizona
Team logo
Cap insignia

Minor league affiliations
- Class: Class A to Triple-A
- League: Arizona Fall League (1994–present)
- Division: West Division (2009–present)

Major league affiliations
- Teams: Cleveland Guardians; Kansas City Royals; New York Mets; Philadelphia Phillies; Texas Rangers

Minor league titles
- League titles (5): 1995; 2013; 2022; 2023; 2025
- Division titles (11): 1992; 1994; 1995; 1996; 1999; 2011; 2013; 2015; 2016; 2019; 2021

Team data
- Name: Surprise Saguaros (2011–present)
- Previous names: Peoria Saguaros (2003–2010); Maryvale Saguaros (1998–2002); Mesa Saguaros (1993–1997); Phoenix Saguaros (1992)
- Ballpark: Surprise Stadium (2011–present)
- Previous parks: Peoria Sports Complex (2003–2010); Maryvale Baseball Park (1998–2002); HoHoKam Park (1997); Phoenix Municipal Stadium (1996); HoHoKam Park (1993–1995); Phoenix Municipal Stadium (1992)
- Manager: Carlos Cardoza

The Surprise Saguaros are a baseball team that plays in the West Division of the Arizona Fall League. They play their home games in Surprise, Arizona, at Surprise Stadium. The ballpark is also the spring training facility of the Kansas City Royals and Texas Rangers. The team was established in 1992 as the Phoenix Saguaros, and has retained its nickname through multiple location changes. The team has won four league championships, most recently in 2023.

== Roster ==
Surprise Saguaros roster
Players	Coaches/Other
Pitchers: 41 Jesus Broca (MIL); 47 Eiberson Castellano (PHI); 38 A.J. Causey (KC); 51 Dennis Colleran (KC); 23 José Corniell (TEX); 45 Kolton Curtis (TEX); 57 Jack Dallas (PHI); 35 Joey Danielson (TEX); 31 Trenton Denholm (CLE); 28 Daniel Espino (CLE); 22 Jaydenn Estanista (PHI); 65 Anthony Flores (MIL); 37 Michael Fowler (MIL); 21 Daniel Harper (PHI); 46 Max Jachec (CLE); 16 Edwin Jimenez (MIL); 36 L.P. Langevin (KC); 12 Rorik Maltrud (CLE); 63 Logan Martin (KC); 33 Tommy McCollum (PHI); 99 Zane Morehouse (CLE); 54 Hunter Owen (KC); 88 Nate Peterson (MIL); 18 Winston Santos (TEX); 32 Emiliano Teodo (TEX); Catchers: 77 Marco Dinges (MIL); 40 Ben Hartl (TEX); 8 Blake Mitchell (KC); 27 Malcolm Moore (TEX); Infielders: 14 Josh Adamczewski (MIL); 20 Luke Adams (MIL); 7 Juan Benjamin (CLE); 13 Bryan Rincon (PHI); 26 Daniel Vazquez (KC); 4 Sebastian Walcott (TEX); Outfielders: 2 Wuilfredo Antunez (CLE); 10 Dylan Campbell (PHI); 6 Dylan Dreiling (TEX); 15 Joe Lampe (CLE); 5 Dante Nori (PHI); 58 Dylan O'Rae (MIL); 1 Carson Roccaforte (KC)	Manager: -- Jesus Azuaje; Coaches: -- Ricky Carvajal (hitting); -- Matt Lawson (hitting); -- Riley McCauley (pitching); -- Michael Peoples (pitching); 7-day injured list; ~ Development list; # Rehab assignment; ∞ Reserve list; ‡ Restricted list; § Suspended list; † Temporarily inactive list; Roster updated October 10, 2025; → More rosters: MiLB • Arizona Fall League

== MLB alumni ==
- Yonder Alonso (first baseman)
- Bryan Anderson (pitcher)
- Tim Beckham (shortstop)
- Mookie Betts (second baseman)
- Bradley Boxberger (pitcher)
- Jason Castro (catcher)
- Alex Cobb (pitcher)
- Zack Cozart (shortstop)
- Delino DeShields (manager)
- Matt Dominguez (third baseman)
- Eduardo Escobar (shortstop)
- Freddie Freeman (first baseman)
- Brandon Gomes (pitcher)
- Chris Heisey (left fielder)
- Brandon Hicks (shortstop)
- Jason Heyward (right fielder)
- Cedric Hunter (center fielder)
- Craig Kimbrel (pitcher)
- Ian Kinsler (second baseman)
- Mike Leake (pitcher)
- Wilton López (pitcher)
- Jerry Manuel (manager)
- Leonys Martín (outfielder)
- Bob Melvin (manager)
- Devin Mesoraco (catcher)
- Justin Miller (pitcher)
- Mike Minor (pitcher)
- Wil Myers (outfielder)
- Mike Olt (third baseman)
- Logan Ondrusek (pitcher)
- Chris Parmelee (first baseman)
- Tony Peña (manager)
- Vinnie Pestano (pitcher)
- Aaron Poreda (pitcher)
- Zach Putnam (pitcher)
- Jimmy Rollins (shortstop)
- Blake Sabol
- Daryl Thompson (pitcher)
- Christian Vázquez (catcher)
- Kolten Wong (second baseman)

== See also ==
- Arizona Fall League § Results by season
