= Curtis Mead =

Australian baseball player (born 2000)

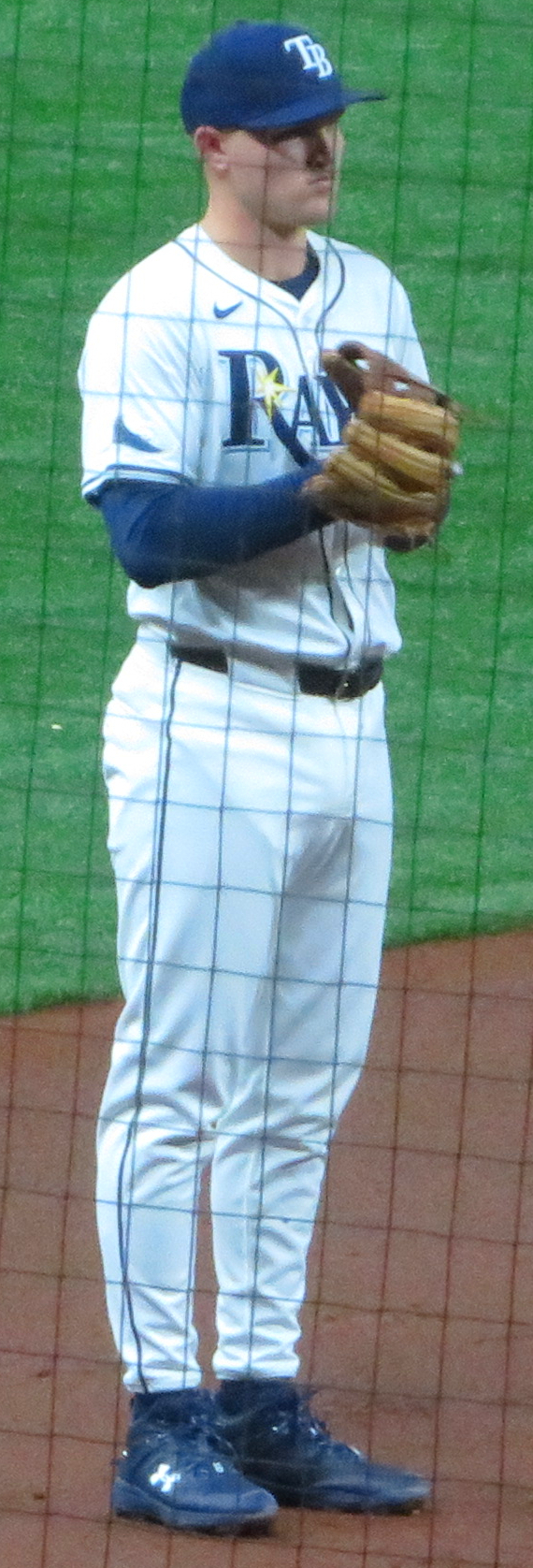
- Mead with the Rays in 2024

Boston Red Sox – No. 11
- Infielder
- Born: 26 October 2000 (age 26); Adelaide, South Australia, Australia
- Bats: Right Throws: Right

MLB debut
- 4 August, 2023, for the Tampa Bay Rays

MLB statistics (through 2026 season)
- Batting average: .244
- Home runs: 22
- Runs batted in: 79
- Stats at Baseball Reference

Teams
- Tampa Bay Rays (2023–2025); Chicago White Sox (2025); Washington Nationals (2026); Boston Red Sox (2026–present)

Curtis James Mead (born 26 October 2000) is an Australian professional baseball infielder for the Boston Red Sox of Major League Baseball (MLB). He has previously played in MLB for the Tampa Bay Rays, Chicago White Sox, and Washington Nationals. He made his MLB debut in 2023.

== Amateur career ==
Mead was born and grew up in Adelaide, South Australia, Australia and attended Immanuel College, Adelaide. He began his professional baseball career at 16 with the Adelaide Giants of the Australian Baseball League, whom his father Tim had previously played for. Mead said in an interview that his father in turn learned baseball from his father (Mead's grandfather), who had learned the game from Americans in World War II. Mead also played Australian rules football for the Woodville-West Torrens Football Club under-16 team until the club required him to choose between the two sports.

== Professional career ==
=== Philadelphia Phillies ===
Mead was signed by the Philadelphia Phillies on 4 May 2018. After signing, he was assigned to the rookie-level Gulf Coast League Phillies. Mead returned to the GCL Phillies in 2019 and recorded a .285 batting average with four home runs and 19 runs batted in (RBIs). After each season, Mead continued to play for the Adelaide Giants in the winter.

=== Tampa Bay Rays ===
The Phillies traded Mead to the Tampa Bay Rays on 20 November 2019, in exchange for Cristopher Sánchez. He did not play in a game for the organization in 2020 due to the cancellation of the minor league season because of the COVID-19 pandemic. Mead subsequently returned to the Giants and was named the team's MVP after batting .347.

Mead began the 2021 season with the Low-A Charleston RiverDogs, where he hit for a .358 average with seven home runs and 35 RBI in 46 games before being promoted to the High-A Bowling Green Hot Rods. He batted .282 with seven home runs, 32 RBI, and an .814 on-base plus slugging (OPS) in 53 games for Bowling Green and was promoted again to the Triple-A Durham Bulls for the final week of the season. After the season, Mead played for the Scottsdale Scorpions in the Arizona Fall League. He was assigned to the Double-A Montgomery Biscuits at the start of the 2022 season. Mead was promoted to Durham after batting .305 with 10 home runs and 36 RBI in 56 games at Montgomery. On 15 November 2022, the Rays selected Mead to their 40-man roster to protect him from the Rule 5 draft.

Mead was optioned to Triple-A Durham to begin the 2023 season, recording a .291/.379/.453 slash line with three home runs and 28 RBI over 46 games. He missed six weeks in May and June with a left wrist fracture. On 4 August 2023, Mead was promoted to the major leagues for the first time. On the first pitch he saw, Mead collected a single against Detroit Tigers pitcher Brendan White. He made 24 appearances for Tampa Bay during his rookie campaign, slashing .253/.326/.349 with one home run and five RBI.

Mead made 38 appearances for the Rays during the 2024 season, slashing .238/.282/.287 with one home run, seven RBI, and two stolen bases. He played in 49 games for the team in 2025, he had a .226/.318/.339 slash line with three home runs, eight RBI, and four stolen bases.

=== Chicago White Sox ===
On 31 July 2025, the Rays traded Mead, Duncan Davitt, and Ben Peoples, to the Chicago White Sox in exchange for Adrian Houser. Mead was initially optioned to the Triple-A Charlotte Knights. After corner infielder Miguel Vargas was injured, Mead was called up to the major-league team. In 41 appearances for the team in 2025, he had a .240/.280/.304 slash line with eight doubles, 11 RBI, and one stolen base.

On 25 March 2026, Mead was designated for assignment by the White Sox after failing to make the team's Opening Day roster.

=== Washington Nationals ===
On 28 March 2026, Mead was traded to the Washington Nationals in exchange for catching prospect Boston Smith. Mead began starting for Washington in mid-May, primarily playing third base, and solidified his position through mid-season by hitting 14 home runs in his first 66 games.

=== Boston Red Sox ===
On 25 July 2026, Mead was traded to the Boston Red Sox in exchange for Connelly Early. Mead went 0–for–1 in his Red Sox debut against the Athletics on 27 July, leaving the game shortly after being hit on his hand with a pitch, an injury that was later deemed a left wrist fracture after initial X-rays came back negative. The injury would keep Mead out for the remainder of the regular season. Prior to Game 2 of the American League Wild Card Series against the New York Yankees, Mead was named as an injury replacement to the roster for Roman Anthony, making him eligible to play. However, the Red Sox would lose Game 2 and the series without Mead making any appearances.

== Player profile ==
Mead is one of a limited numbers of Australians to play in MLB, and one of an even fewer number of position players.

By mid-season 2026, at age 25, Mead was in third place among Australians in plate appearances in MLB in the modern era, behind only 1990s players Dave Nilsson and Craig Shipley.
