= Adrian Houser =

American baseball player (born 1993)

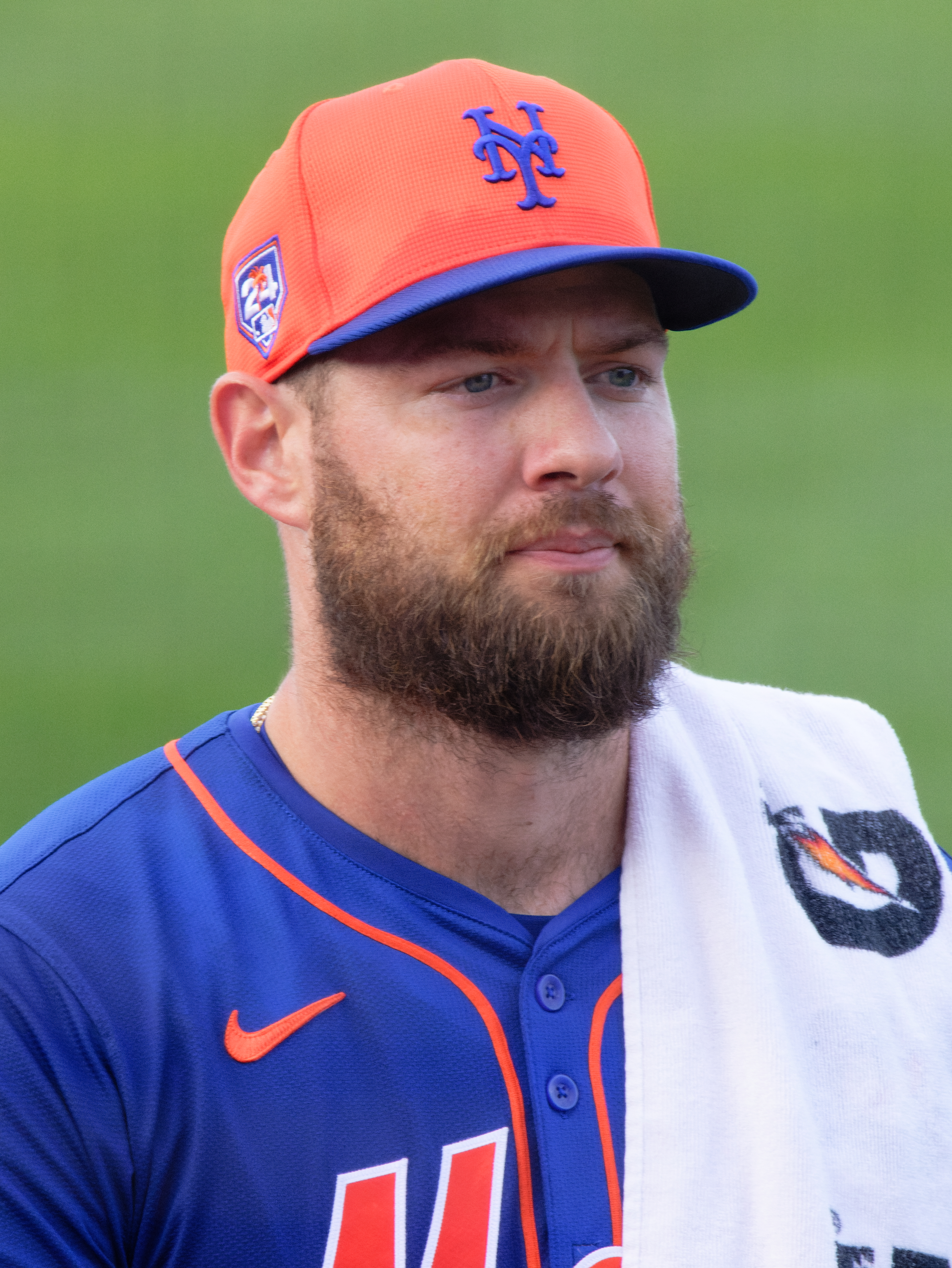
- Houser with the Mets in 2024

San Francisco Giants – No. 12
- Pitcher
- Born: February 2, 1993 (age 33); Tahlequah, Oklahoma, U.S.
- Bats: Right Throws: Right

MLB debut
- September 26, 2015, for the Milwaukee Brewers

MLB statistics (through 2026 season)
- Win–loss record: 44–51
- Earned run average: 4.06
- Strikeouts: 651
- Stats at Baseball Reference

Teams
- Milwaukee Brewers (2015, 2018–2023); New York Mets (2024); Chicago White Sox (2025); Tampa Bay Rays (2025); San Francisco Giants (2026–present)

Adrian David Houser (born February 2, 1993) is an American professional baseball pitcher for the San Francisco Giants of Major League Baseball (MLB). He has previously played in MLB for the Milwaukee Brewers, New York Mets, Chicago White Sox, and Tampa Bay Rays.

== Career ==
=== Amateur career ===
Houser attended Locust Grove High School in Locust Grove, Oklahoma. He committed to attend the University of Oklahoma to play college baseball for the Oklahoma Sooners baseball team.

=== Houston Astros ===
The Houston Astros of Major League Baseball (MLB) selected Houser in the second round, with the 69th overall selection, of the 2011 MLB draft. Houser signed a contract with Houston three days after he was drafted and was subsequently assigned to the Rookie-level Gulf Coast League (GCL) Astros. After six GCL games in which he went 1–2 with a 4.03 ERA and 25 strikeouts, the Astros promoted Houser to the Greeneville Astros of the Appalachian League, their other Rookie ball team. Between the two teams, Houser went 2–4 in his first season of professional baseball, with a 4.31 ERA and 44 strikeouts in 12 games and 48 innings pitched. Houser spent the entire 2012 season with Greeneville as well, going 3–4 in 11 starts with a 4.19 ERA and 54 strikeouts in 58 innings.

Houser spent 2013 with the Tri-City ValleyCats where he pitched to an 0–4 record and a 3.42 ERA in 14 games (nine starts), and 2014 with the Quad Cities River Bandits where he went 5–6 with a 4.14 ERA in 25 games, 17 being starts. He started 2015 with the Lancaster JetHawks and was promoted to the Corpus Christi Hooks.

=== Milwaukee Brewers ===
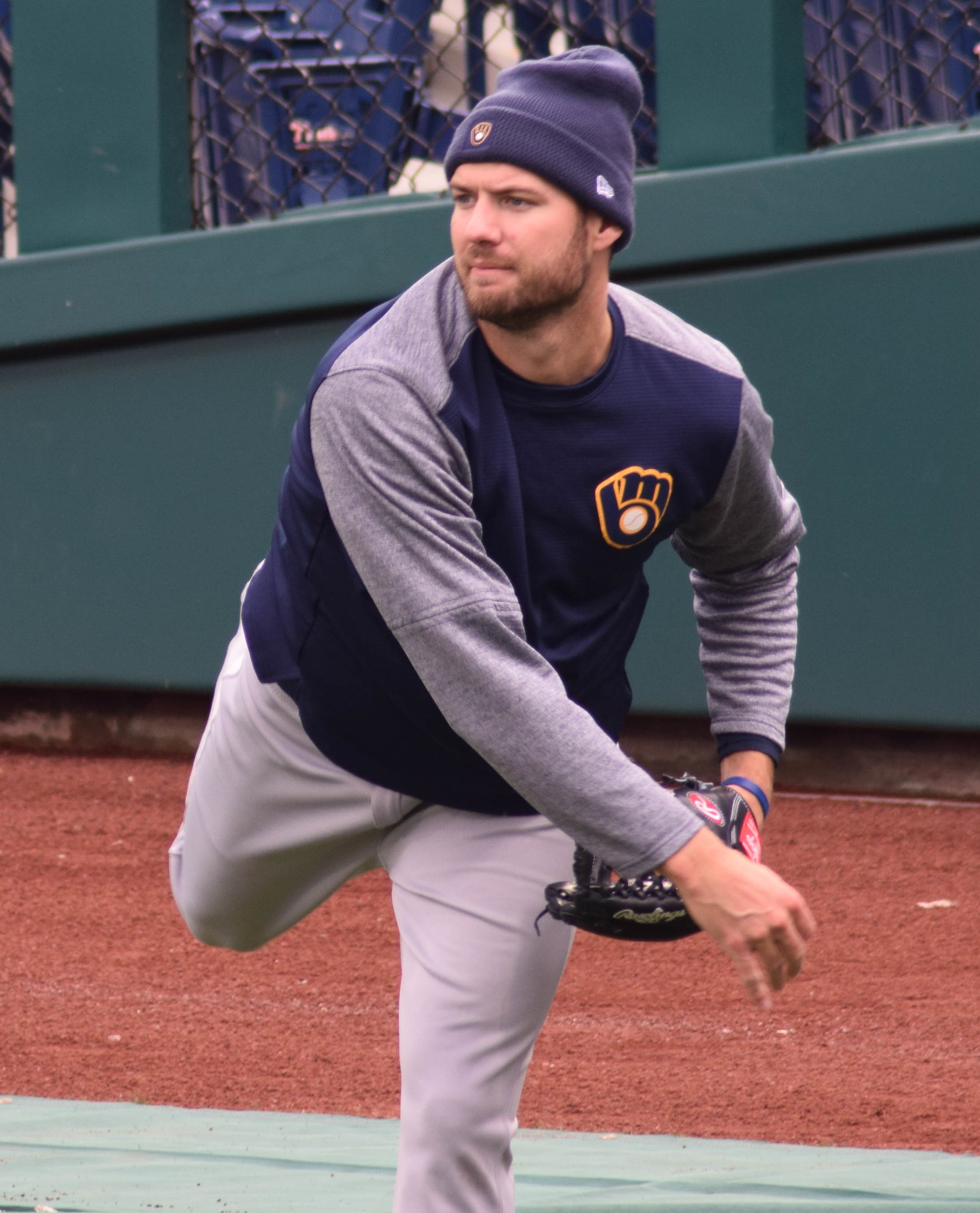
Houser with the Brewers in 2019

On July 30, 2015, the Astros traded Houser, along with Brett Phillips, Domingo Santana and Josh Hader, to the Milwaukee Brewers for Carlos Gómez and Mike Fiers. Milwaukee assigned him to the Biloxi Shuckers. In 26 games (20 starts) between Lancaster, Corpus Christi and Biloxi, he compiled a 7–5 record with a 4.43 ERA.

Houser was promoted to Milwaukee for the annual September call-ups. He made his major league debut on September 26, 2015. Houser made two appearances for Milwaukee in 2015 and allowed no earned runs. In 2016, Houser spent all of the season with Biloxi, going 3–7 with a 5.25 ERA in 13 starts. On July 21, 2016, Houser underwent Tommy John Surgery. Houser's 2017 season was limited as he recovered from the procedure, he pitched only 17 2/3 innings all season. He began 2018 with Biloxi.

Houser was recalled to the Brewers' major league roster on June 17, 2018, and pitched the team's game against the Philadelphia Phillies later that day. He vomited twice on the mound during that game. This would be the first of several occurrences where Houser vomited during a game. On August 11, 2019, in a game against the Texas Rangers, Houser misfielded a ground ball hit at him by Elvis Andrus. Shortly after, Houser walked towards the back of the mound, where he vomited, the second such time Houser had vomited on the mound during a game. After this, he proceeded to notch ten strikeouts and finish the game as the winning pitcher. In 2018 Houser appeared in seven games and notched a 3.29 ERA. In 2019 for Milwaukee, Houser appeared in 35 games, pitching to a 6–7 record and a 3.72 ERA with 117 strikeouts in 111 1/3 innings pitched. In 2020, Houser recorded a 5.30 ERA and 1–6 record with 44 strikeouts in 56 innings of work across 12 games.

On April 27, 2021, Houser hit his first major league home run off of Daniel Castano of the Miami Marlins. In a game against the Marlins on May 8, Houser hit his second career home run, also off of Castano. 2021 was a productive year for Houser. He appeared in 28 games and made 26 starts. Houser finished the season with a 3.22 ERA. Houser also tossed his first complete-game shutout against the Cardinals on September 4. Houser's salary for the 2022 season was decided via the arbitration process; he had asked for $3 million, and received $2.425 million. In 2022, Houser posted a 6–10 record with a 4.73 ERA, and had the lowest LOB percentage in the majors (60.8%).

On November 18, 2022, Houser signed a one-year, $3.6 million contract with the Brewers, avoiding arbitration. In 2023, Houser appeared in 23 games, most of which were starts, and posted a 8–5 record and 4.12 ERA with 96 strikeouts.

=== New York Mets ===
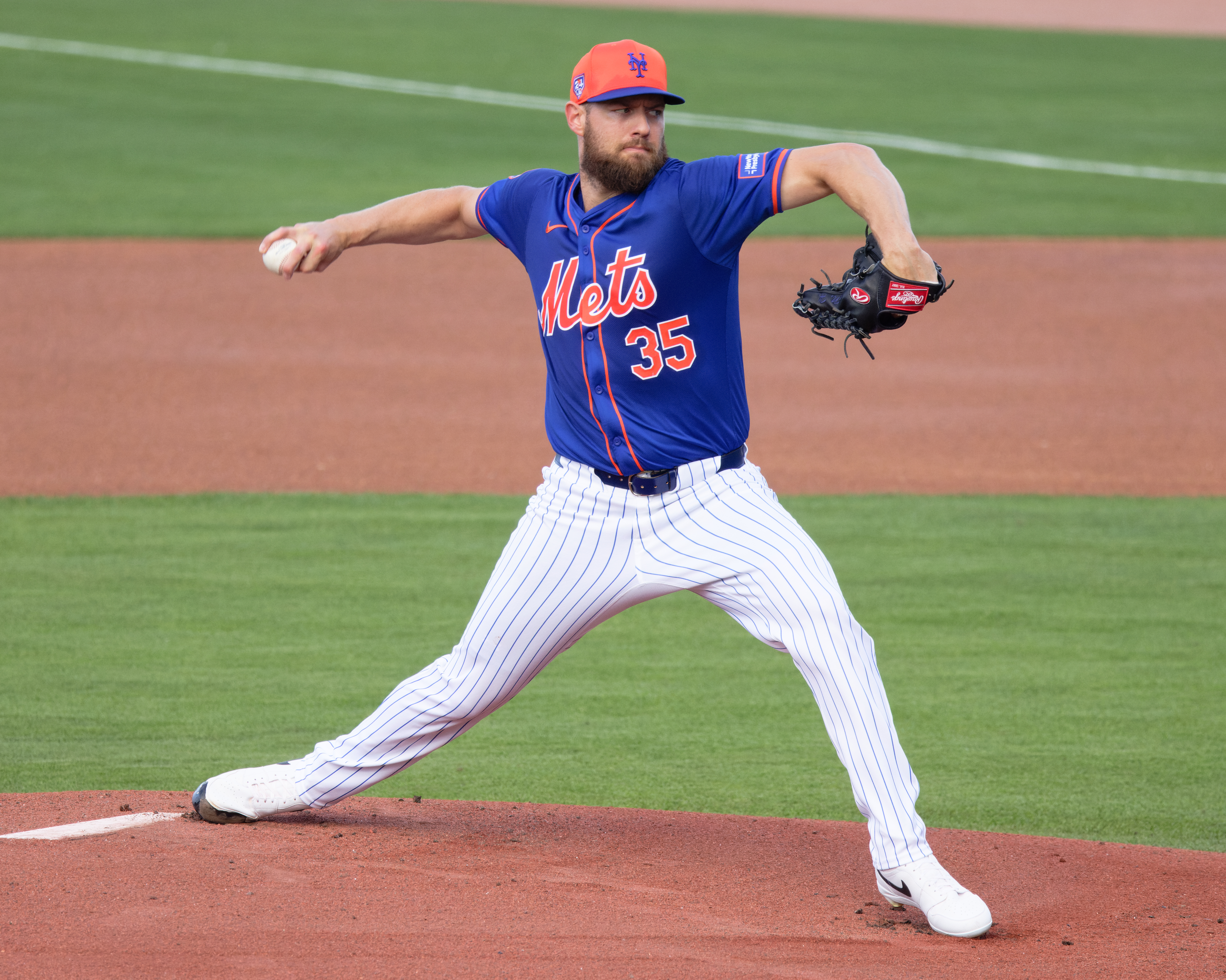
Houser pitching for the Mets in 2024

On December 20, 2023, the Brewers traded Houser and Tyrone Taylor to the New York Mets in exchange for Coleman Crow. He made 23 appearances (7 starts) for New York in 2024, logging a 1–5 record and 5.84 ERA with 45 strikeouts across 69 1/3 innings pitched. Houser was designated for assignment by the Mets on July 26, 2024. On July 31, he was released by the team.

=== Chicago Cubs ===
On August 6, 2024, Houser signed a minor league contract with the Chicago Cubs. In 4 starts for the Triple–A Iowa Cubs, he posted a 3.86 ERA with 12 strikeouts over 18 2/3 innings pitched. Houser was released by the Cubs on August 31.

=== Baltimore Orioles ===
On August 31, 2024, Houser signed a minor league contract with the Baltimore Orioles. In 3 starts for the Triple–A Norfolk Tides, he struggled, posting an 0–2 record and 9.18 ERA with 13 strikeouts across 16 2/3 innings pitched. Houser elected free agency following the season on November 4.

=== Texas Rangers ===
On December 7, 2024, Houser signed a minor league contract with the Texas Rangers. In nine appearances (eight starts) for the Triple-A Round Rock Express, he posted a 2–2 record and 5.03 ERA with 37 strikeouts across 39 1/3 innings pitched. Houser was released by the Rangers on May 15.

=== Chicago White Sox ===
On May 20, 2025, Houser signed a one-year, $1.35 million contract with the Chicago White Sox. He made his White Sox debut the same day, giving up two hits over six scoreless innings and earning a win. Houser made 11 starts for the White Sox, including a start where he pitched 8 innings and gave up 0 earned runs. In 2025, Houser posted a 2.10 ERA with the White Sox.

=== Tampa Bay Rays ===
On July 31, 2025, the White Sox traded Houser to the Tampa Bay Rays in exchange for Curtis Mead, Duncan Davitt, and Ben Peoples. In 10 starts for Tampa Bay, Houser compiled a 2–3 record and 4.79 ERA with 45 strikeouts across 56 1/3 innings pitched. In 2025, between the Rays and White Sox, Houser finished with a 8–5 record, 125 innings pitched,a 3.31 ERA, and a career high 3.1 WAR.

=== San Francisco Giants ===
On December 19, 2025, Houser signed a two-year, $22 million contract with the San Francisco Giants. On June 20, 2026, it was announced that Houser would be transitioning to bullpen work after posting a 5.73 ERA over 66 innings out of the rotation. After strong appearances out of the bullpen, Houser received another opporotunity to start on August 12; in that start, he gave up two hits and struck out five batters over six scoreless innings as the Giants fell to the Houston Astros, 2–1. On August 25, Houser suffered a season–ending flexor strain in a start against the Cincinnati Reds. Houser made 26 appearances (including 16 starts) for San Francisco, compiling a 4–7 record and 4.02 ERA with 75 strikeouts across 109 2/3 innings pitched.

== Personal life ==
Houser is married to Megan Houser. Houser is the nephew of James Knott, a pitcher who was selected by the New York Mets in the 11th round of the 1992 MLB draft. His older brother Michael played college baseball for Northeastern State.

Houser is a member of the Cherokee Nation. He is close friends with fellow Cherokee Nation member and MLB pitcher Ryan Helsley.

== See also ==
- List of Native American sportspeople
