= Duncan Davitt =

American baseball player (born 1999)

Cincinnati Reds
- Pitcher
- Born: September 23, 1999 (age 27); Des Moines, Iowa, U.S.
- Bats: Right Throws: Right

MLB debut
- April 10, 2026, for the Chicago White Sox

MLB statistics (through 2026 season)
- Win–loss record: 0–1
- Earned run average: 7.88
- Strikeouts: 5
- Stats at Baseball Reference

Teams
- Chicago White Sox (2026); San Francisco Giants (2026)

Duncan Philip Danner Davitt (born September 23, 1999) is an American professional baseball pitcher for the Cincinnati Reds of Major League Baseball (MLB). He has previously played in MLB for the Chicago White Sox and San Francisco Giants. He made his MLB debut in 2026.

== Career ==
Davitt attended Indianola High School in Indianola, Iowa. He then enrolled at the University of Iowa, where he played college baseball for the Iowa Hawkeyes. He was selected by the Tampa Bay Rays in the 18th round of the 2022 Major League Baseball draft.

=== Chicago White Sox ===
On July 31, 2025, the Rays traded Davitt, Curtis Mead, and Ben Peoples to the Chicago White Sox in exchange for Adrian Houser. He made nine starts down the stretch for the Triple-A Charlotte Knights, posting a 2-3 record and 5.03 ERA with 45 strikeouts across 48 1/3 innings pitched. On November 18, the White Sox added Davitt to their 40-man roster to protect him from the Rule 5 draft.

Davitt was optioned to Triple-A Charlotte to begin the 2026 season. On April 9, the White Sox promoted Davitt to the major leagues for the first time. The following day he made his major league debut against the Kansas City Royals. Davitt made two appearances for Chicago, recording a 4.50 ERA with one strikeout over two innings. On August 3, Davitt was designated for assignment by the White Sox.

=== Atlanta Braves ===
On August 3, 2026, the White Sox traded Davitt to the Atlanta Braves in exchange for Joey Bart. Davitt made four appearances for the Triple–A Gwinnett Stripers, recording a 6.43 ERA with five strikeouts in six games; he also logged four games for the Double–A Columbus Clingstones, struggling to a 6.75 ERA with nine strikeouts and two saves.

=== San Francisco Giants ===
On September 9, 2026, Davitt was claimed off waivers by the San Francisco Giants. Davitt made four appearances for San Francisco, struggling to an 0–1 record and 9.00 ERA with four strikeouts over six innings of work.

=== Cincinnati Reds ===
On November 2, 2026, Davitt was claimed off of waivers by the Cincinnati Reds.
