= Carter Baumler =

American baseball player (born 2002)

Baltimore Orioles
- Pitcher
- Born: January 31, 2002 (age 24); Des Moines, Iowa, U.S.
- Bats: Right Throws: Right

MLB debut
- March 26, 2026, for the Texas Rangers

MLB statistics (through 2026 season)
- Win–loss record: 0–0
- Earned run average: 3.18
- Strikeouts: 6
- Stats at Baseball Reference

Teams
- Texas Rangers (2026)

Carter Cornelius Baumler (born January 31, 2002) is an American professional baseball pitcher in the Baltimore Orioles organization. He made his Major League Baseball (MLB) debut in 2026 for the Texas Rangers.

== Amateur career ==
Baumler grew up in Grimes, Iowa, and attended Dowling Catholic High School. He had committed to play college baseball at Texas Christian University.

== Professional career ==
=== Baltimore Orioles ===
The Baltimore Orioles selected Baumler in the fifth round of the 2020 Major League Baseball draft. He signed with the team and received a $1.5 million signing bonus. Baumler did not appear for the organization during the regular season due to the cancellation of the minor league season because of the COVID-19 pandemic. He took part in the Orioles' fall instructional league, but tore the ulnar collateral ligament in his pitching elbow, requiring him to undergo Tommy John surgery and miss the entire 2021 season.

Baumler was assigned to the Single-A Delmarva Shorebirds in May 2022 to begin his professional career, where he recorded a 1.54 ERA across four starts. In 2023, Baumler made seven appearances (including five starts) split between Delmarva and the rookie–level Florida Complex League Orioles, accumulating a 1–0 record and 3.18 ERA with 21 strikeouts over 17 innings of work. He split the 2024 season between Delmarva and the High–A Aberdeen IronBirds, posting a cumulative 4–1 record and 5.75 ERA wi the 17 strikeouts in 20 1/3 innings pitched across 10 appearances (including one start).

On August 16, 2025, while playing for High-A Aberdeen, Baumler combined with Luis De León, Jacob Cravey, and Zane Barnhart to no-hit the Hudson Valley Renegades. He split the year between the FCL Orioles, Aberdeen, and the Double–A Chesapeake Baysox. In 28 appearances out of the bullpen for the three affiliates, Baumler registered a cumulative 2–0 record and 2.04 ERA with 46 strikeouts and two saves.

=== Texas Rangers ===
On December 10, 2025, Baumler was selected by the Pittsburgh Pirates in the Rule 5 draft and then was traded to the Texas Rangers in exchange for pitcher Jaiker Garcia and cash considerations immediately after. On March 23, 2026, Baumler was informed he had made the team's Opening Day roster during a mound visit by manager Skip Schumaker. On April 5, Baumler was placed on the injured list due to a right intercostal strain. He was transferred to the 60-day injured list on May 23.

=== Baltimore Orioles (second stint) ===
On November 19, 2026, Baumler was returned to the Orioles by the Rangers and assigned to the Triple–A Norfolk Tides.

== See also ==
- Rule 5 draft results
