= Cody Freeman =

American baseball player (born 2001)

Texas Rangers – No. 39
- Infielder
- Born: January 5, 2001 (age 25); Pomona, California, U.S.
- Bats: Right Throws: Right

MLB debut
- July 18, 2025, for the Texas Rangers

MLB statistics (through 2026 season)
- Batting average: .236
- Home runs: 4
- Runs batted in: 21
- Stats at Baseball Reference

Teams
- Texas Rangers (2025–present)

Cody Nicholas Freeman (born January 5, 2001) is an American professional baseball infielder for the Texas Rangers of Major League Baseball (MLB). He made his MLB debut in 2025.

== Career ==
Freeman attended Etiwanda High School in Rancho Cucamonga, California. Freeman committed to play college baseball at Baylor University.

The Texas Rangers selected Freeman in the fourth round of the 2019 MLB draft, and signed with them for a $900,000 signing bonus. He made his professional debut in 2019 with the AZL Rangers of the Rookie-level Arizona League, hitting .233/.384/.283 with 10 RBI. Freeman did not play in a game in 2020 due to the cancellation of the minor league season because of the COVID-19 pandemic. He split the 2021 season between the Arizona Complex League Rangers and the Down East Wood Ducks of the Low-A East, hitting a combined .245/.351/.377 with six home runs and 36 RBI.

Freeman spent the 2022 season with the Hickory Crawdads of the High-A East, hitting .234/.312/.366 with 13 home runs and 71 RBI. Following the 2022 season, he played for the Surprise Saguaros of the Arizona Fall League. Freeman split the 2023 season between Hickory and the Frisco RoughRiders of the Double-A Texas League, hitting .234/.301/.399 with 12 home runs and 55 RBI. He returned to Frisco for the 2024 season, hitting .264/.320/.432 with 14 home runs and 63 RBI. He returned to the AFL following the 2024 season, thriving and hitting .308/.416/.508 with 2 home runs and 8 RBI over 18 games. Freeman was assigned to the Round Rock Express of the Triple-A Pacific Coast League to open the 2025 season.

On July 18, 2025, Freeman was selected to the 40-man roster and promoted to the major leagues for the first time. He made his debut that night as a pinch runner. On July 21, Freeman recorded his first career hit, an RBI double off of Jacob Lopez of the Athletics. On August 23, he hit his first career home run, a two-run shot off of Cleveland Guardians started Logan Allen.

== Personal life ==
Cody's older brother, Tyler, is also an MLB player. His brother in law, Shane McGuire, is also a professional baseball player.
