= Nolan Kingham =

American baseball player (born 1996)

Free agent
- Pitcher
- Born: August 18, 1996 (age 30); Las Vegas, Nevada, U.S.
- Bats: Right Throws: Right

MLB debut
- August 3, 2026, for the Texas Rangers

MLB statistics (through 2026 season)
- Win–loss record: 0–0
- Earned run average: 9.00
- Strikeouts: 1
- Stats at Baseball Reference

Teams
- Texas Rangers (2026)

Nolan Ray Kingham (born August 18, 1996) is an American professional baseball pitcher who is a free agent. He has previously played in Major League Baseball (MLB) for the Texas Rangers.

== Early life and amateur career ==
Kingham grew up in Las Vegas, Nevada and initially attended Sierra Vista High School before transferring to Desert Oasis High School before his senior year. Kingham was selected in the 39th round of the 2015 Major League Baseball draft by the Milwaukee Brewers, but opted not to sign.

Kingham played college baseball for the Texas Longhorns for three seasons. He pitched mostly in relief during his freshman season and appeared in 21 total games and finished with a 2–3 record and a 3.79 ERA. As a sophomore, Kingham was moved to the starting rotation and was named first team All-Big 12 Conference after leading the Longhorns with a 10–4 record and a 2.84 ERA.

== Professional career ==
=== Atlanta Braves ===
The Atlanta Braves selected Kingham in the 12th round, with the 352nd overall selection, of the 2018 Major League Baseball draft. After signing with the team, he was assigned to the rookie–level Danville Braves. Kingham began the 2019 season with the Single–A Rome Braves before being promoted to the Florida Fire Frogs of the High–A Florida State League after allowing one earned run over 16 innings pitched. After throwing three complete game shutouts with Florida, he was promoted in August 2019 to the Double-A Mississippi Braves and had a 3.79 ERA over six starts. Kingham did not play during 2020 due to the cancellation of the minor league season because of the COVID-19 pandemic.

Kingham returned to the Mississippi Braves for the start of the 2021 minor league season before being promoted to the Triple-A Gwinnett Stripers. With Gwinnett, he posted a 0–5 record and 10.13 ERA, and returned to Mississippi on August 17. Kingham then spent nearly one month on the injured list and returned to action in mid-September as Mississippi's closer. He started the 2022 season back in Triple–A. In 32 games (19 starts) split between Gwinnett and Mississippi, Kingham accumulated a 5–7 record and 4.62 ERA with 73 strikeouts across 97 1/3 innings.

Kingham was placed on the Gwinnett Stripers' 2023 Opening Day roster, beginning his third consecutive season with the affiliate. He made 27 appearances (13 starts) split between Gwinnett and Mississippi, registering a combined 4–6 record and 4.38 ERA with 63 strikeouts across 86 1/3 innings pitched. On March 21, 2024, Kingham was released by the Braves organization.

=== Sultanes de Monterrey ===
On April 10, 2024, Kingham signed with the Sultanes de Monterrey of the Mexican League. He made 14 appearances (including eight starts) for Monterrey during the year, posting a 3-1 record and 3.64 ERA with 32 strikeouts over 42 innings of work.

Kingham started 17 games for the Sultanes during the 2025 season, compiling a 6-4 record and 5.21 ERA with 55 strikeouts across 84 2/3 innings pitched. He made six starts for Monterrey to begin the 2026 campaign, registering a 3-0 record and 1.82 ERA with 29 strikeouts across 34 2/3 innings pitched.

=== Texas Rangers ===
On May 28, 2026, Kingham signed a minor league contract with the Texas Rangers. He made 11 appearances (including 10 starts) for the Triple–A Round Rock Express, compiling a 2–5 record and 6.99 ERA with 44 strikeouts across 46 1/3 innings pitched. On August 1, Kingham was selected to the 40-man roster and promoted to the major leagues for the first time. He made his MLB debut on August 3, allowing one run in an inning of work against the San Francisco Giants. Kingham was designated for assignment by the Rangers on August 7.

=== Seattle Mariners ===
On August 10, 2026, Kingham was claimed off of waivers by the Seattle Mariners. In three starts for the Triple–A Tacoma Rainiers, he recorded a 4.30 ERA with 17 strikeouts across 14 2/3 innings pitched. Kingham was designated for assignment by Seattle on September 1. He cleared waivers and was sent outright to Tacoma on September 3. He elected free agency on November 2.

== Personal life ==
Nolan's brother, Nick, also played in MLB for the Pittsburgh Pirates and Toronto Blue Jays.
