= Jacob Latz =

American baseball player (born 1996)

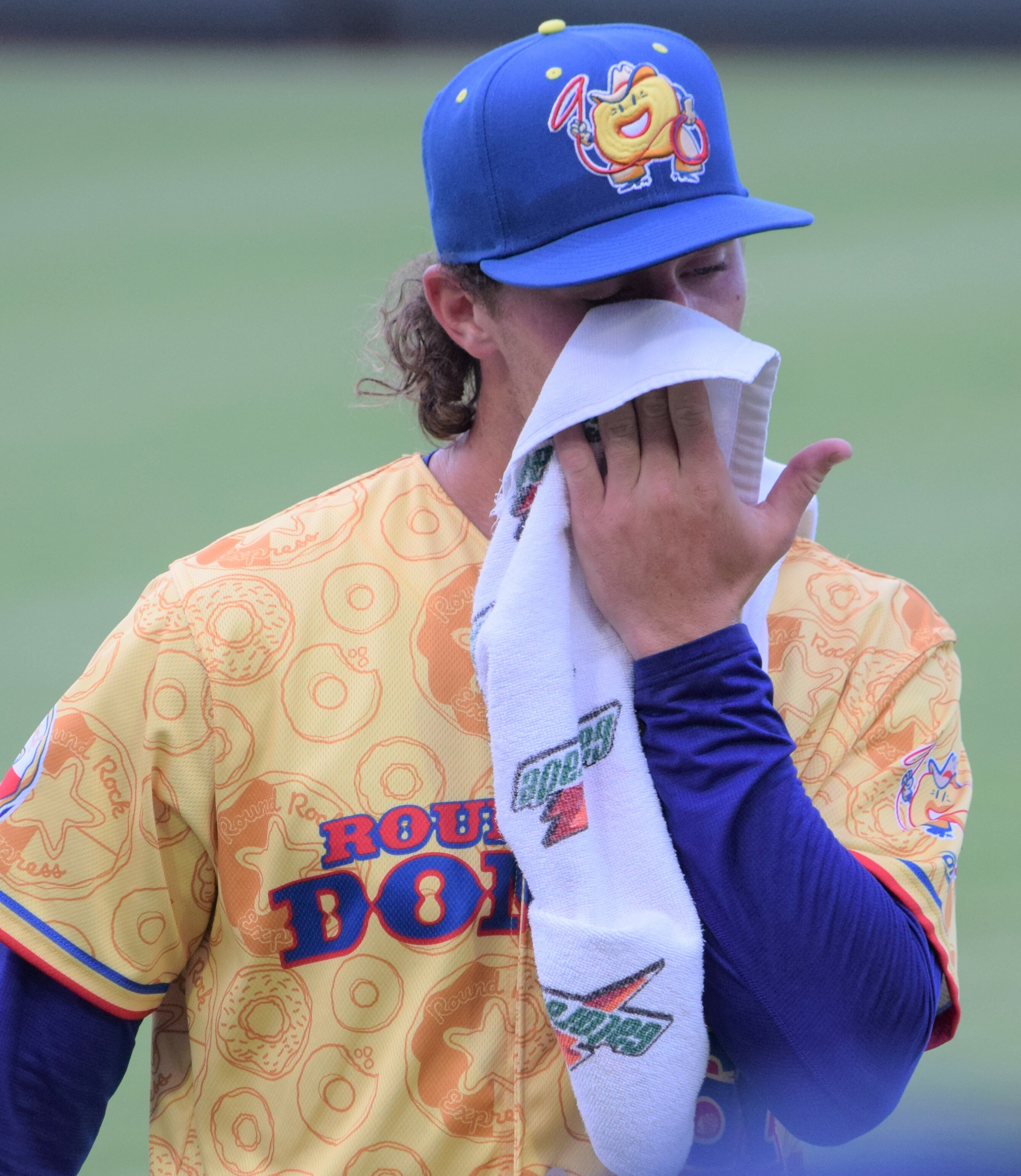
- Latz with the Round Rock Express in 2023

Texas Rangers – No. 67
- Pitcher
- Born: April 8, 1996 (age 30); Lemont, Illinois, U.S.
- Bats: Right Throws: Left

MLB debut
- August 25, 2021, for the Texas Rangers

MLB statistics (through 2026 season)
- Win–loss record: 7–8
- Earned run average: 2.76
- Strikeouts: 208
- Saves: 31
- Stats at Baseball Reference

Teams
- Texas Rangers (2021, 2023–present)

Career highlights and awards
- All-Star (2026)

Jacob Eugene Latz (born April 8, 1996) is an American professional baseball pitcher for the Texas Rangers of Major League Baseball (MLB). He made his MLB debut in 2021. Latz was named to his first All-Star game in 2026.

== Amateur career ==
Latz attended Lemont High School in Lemont, Illinois. Latz pitched to a 10–0 record with a 0.23 ERA and 114 strikeouts over 62 1/3 innings his senior season of high school and was named the 2014 Illinois Player of the Year. He was drafted by the Toronto Blue Jays in the 11th round of the 2014 MLB draft, but turned down a $1 million signing bonus and attended Louisiana State University to play college baseball. Latz was given a medical redshirt due to a stress reaction in his left elbow that caused him to miss the 2015 season. He played for the DuPage County Hounds of the Midwest Collegiate League in 2015. In 8 1/3 innings for the Tigers in 2016, he went 0–1 with a 7.56 ERA. Latz transferred to Kent State University for the 2017 season and was forced to sit out the season due to transfer rules. He was drafted the Texas Rangers in the 5th round of the 2017 MLB draft, and signed with them for a $386,100 signing bonus.

== Professional career ==
Latz made his professional debut in 2017 with the AZL Rangers of the Rookie-level Arizona League, going 0–1 with a 6.75 ERA over just 2 2/3 innings. He played for the Spokane Indians of the Low–A Northwest League in 2018, going 6–3 with a 3.13 ERA and 67 strikeouts over 71 innings. Latz split the 2019 season between the Hickory Crawdads of the Single–A South Atlantic League and the Down East Wood Ducks of the High–A Carolina League, going a combined 7–1 with 1.62 ERA and 74 strikeouts over 61 innings. Due to the cancelation of the 2020 minor league season because of the COVID-19 pandemic, Latz joined the Sugar Land Skeeters of the independent Constellation Energy League. Over 10 1/3 innings for Sugar Land, Latz posted a 2–1 record with a 4.35 ERA and 15 strikeouts. He was assigned to the Rangers alternate training site in September 2020. He split the 2021 minor league season between the Frisco RoughRiders of the Double-A Central and the Round Rock Express of the Triple-A West, going a combined 2–2 with a 4.30 ERA and 119 strikeouts over 96 1/3 innings.

On August 25, 2021, Texas selected his contract to the 40-man roster and promoted him to the major leagues to make his MLB debut that night against the Cleveland Indians. Due to 2021 MLB COVID-19 outbreak rules, his addition to the 40-man roster was temporary. In his debut, he threw 4 2/3 innings while striking out 4 and suffering the loss. He was returned to Round Rock and removed from the 40-man roster on August 30. Latz spent the 2022 season back with Round Rock, going 5–5 with a 5.77 ERA, and 59 strikeouts over 53 innings.

Latz returned to Round Rock to open the 2023 season. In 46 appearances, he recorded a 4.10 ERA with 87 strikeouts and 7 saves in 63 2/3 innings of work. On September 16, 2023, Texas selected Latz’s contract, adding him to the major league roster. He made three scoreless appearances for the Rangers, striking out five in 6 1/3 innings of work.

Latz made 46 appearances out of the bullpen for the Rangers during the 2024 campaign, compiling a 2-3 record and 3.71 ERA with 40 strikeouts across 43 2/3 innings pitched.

Latz was optioned to Triple-A Round Rock to begin the 2025 season.

Awards and achievements
| Preceded by Cade Smith | American League Reliever of the Month; June 2026 | Succeeded by Aroldis Chapman |
