= Peyton Gray =

American baseball player (born 1995)

Texas Rangers – No. 75
- Pitcher
- Born: June 2, 1995 (age 31); Columbus, Indiana, U.S.
- Bats: Right Throws: Right

MLB debut
- April 23, 2026, for the Texas Rangers

MLB statistics (through 2026 season)
- Win–loss record: 6–0
- Earned run average: 3.86
- Strikeouts: 60
- Stats at Baseball Reference

Teams
- Texas Rangers (2026–present)

Peyton Charles Paul Gray (born June 2, 1995) is an American professional baseball pitcher for the Texas Rangers of Major League Baseball (MLB). He made his MLB debut in 2026.

== Amateur career ==
Gray attended Columbus East High School in Columbus, Indiana. Gray attended Western Michigan University for his freshman year of college. He then transferred to Gulf Coast State College for his sophomore season. Gray transferred to Florida Gulf Coast University for his final two years of college. In 2018, Gray signed with the Colorado Rockies as an undrafted free agent.

== Professional career ==
Gray spent the 2018 and 2019 seasons in the Colorado Rockies organization before being released in 2020. He spent the 2020 season with the independent league Milwaukee Milkmen. Gray then signed and spent the 2021 season in the Kansas City Royals organization. After being released, he returned to the Milwaukee Milkmen for the 2022 and 2023 seasons. He signed with the Cincinnati Reds prior to the 2024 season, but did not play due to injury.

On January 21, 2025, Gray signed with the Texas Rangers organization. He split the 2025 season between the Frisco RoughRiders of the Double–A Texas League and the Round Rock Express of the Triple-A Pacific Coast League, going a combined 8–6 with a 3.58 ERA with 89 strikeouts over 73 innings.

On April 23, 2026, Texas selected Gray's contract and promoted him to the major league roster for the first time. On May 30, Gray earned his first career win, recording two strikeouts across a scoreless inning of relief against the Kansas City Royals.
