= Emiliano Teodo =

Dominican baseball player (born 2001)

Texas Rangers – No. 56
- Pitcher
- Born: February 14, 2001 (age 25); Barahona, Dominican Republic
- Bats: Right Throws: Right

MLB debut
- July 17, 2026, for the Texas Rangers

MLB statistics (through 2026 season)
- Win–loss record: 0–0
- Earned run average: 10.80
- Strikeouts: 1
- Stats at Baseball Reference

Teams
- Texas Rangers (2026–present)

Emiliano Teodo (born February 14, 2001) is a Dominican professional baseball pitcher for the Texas Rangers of Major League Baseball (MLB). He made his MLB debut in 2026.

== Career ==
Teodo signed with the Texas Rangers as an international free agent on January 28, 2020 for a $10,000 signing bonus. He made his professional debut in 2021 with the Arizona Complex League Rangers of the Rookie-level Arizona Complex League, going 4–2 with a 3.38 ERA and 48 strikeouts over 29 2/3 innings. Teodo spent the 2022 season with the Down East Wood Ducks of the Low-A Carolina League, going 3–6 with a 3.09 ERA and 115 strikeouts over 84 1/3 innings. He spent the 2023 season with the Hickory Crawdads of the High-A South Atlantic League, going 5–3 with a 4.52 ERA and 84 strikeouts over 61 2/3 innings. Following the 2023 season, he played for the Surprise Saguaros in the Arizona Fall League. Teodo recorded 19 strikeouts over scoreless 11 innings in 8 games, and was named the 2023 AFL Reliever of the Year.

Teodo opened the 2024 season with the Frisco RoughRiders of the Double-A Texas League. Teodo represented Texas at the 2024 All-Star Futures Game. In 20 games (19 starts) for Frisco, he logged a 5–4 record and 1.98 ERA with 110 strikeouts across 86 1/3 innings pitched. Following the season, the Rangers added Teodo to their 40-man roster to protect him from the Rule 5 draft.

Teodo was optioned to the Triple-A Round Rock Express to begin the 2025 season. He made 27 appearances split between Round Rock, Frisco, and the ACL Rangers, accumulating a 3-2 record and 7.20 ERA with 38 strikeouts over 30 innings of work.

Teodo was again optioned to Triple-A Round Rock to begin the 2026 season. In 35 appearances, he compiled a 3–3 record and 3.76 ERA with 52 strikeouts and five saves across 40 2/3 innings pitched. On July 12, 2026, Teodo was promoted to the major leagues for the first time.
