= Ben Peoples =

American baseball player (born 2001)

Texas Rangers – No. 70
- Pitcher
- Born: May 1, 2001 (age 25); Columbia, Tennessee, U.S.
- Bats: Right Throws: Right

MLB debut
- July 4, 2026, for the Texas Rangers

MLB statistics (through 2026 season)
- Win-loss record: 0–1
- Earned run average: 2.76
- Strikeouts: 10
- Stats at Baseball Reference

Teams
- Texas Rangers (2026–present)

Benjamin Cole Peoples (born May 1, 2001) is an American professional baseball pitcher for the Texas Rangers of Major League Baseball (MLB). He debuted in MLB in 2026.

== Amateur career ==
Peoples attended Giles County High School in Pulaski, Tennessee.

== Professional career ==
Peoples was selected by the Tampa Bay Rays in the 22nd round of the 2019 Major League Baseball draft. He made his professional debut that year with the Gulf Coast Rays. In 2025, the Rays converted him from a starting pitcher to a relief pitcher. He started the season with the Durham Bulls.

On July 31, 2025, the Rays traded Peoples along with Curtis Mead and Duncan Davitt to the Chicago White Sox for Adrian Houser. He started his White Sox career with the Charlotte Knights and returned there to start 2026.

On June 30, 2026, the White Sox traded Peoples to the Texas Rangers in exchange for Ben Hartl. On July 2, the Rangers selected his contract and promoted him to the major leagues. He pitched 12.1 innings and recorded a 2.19 ERA. On August 8, 2026, he was optioned to Triple-A Round Rock Express to make room on the roster for starter MacKenzie Gore pending Gore's return from the paternity list.
