= Winston Santos (baseball) =

Dominican baseball player (born 2002)

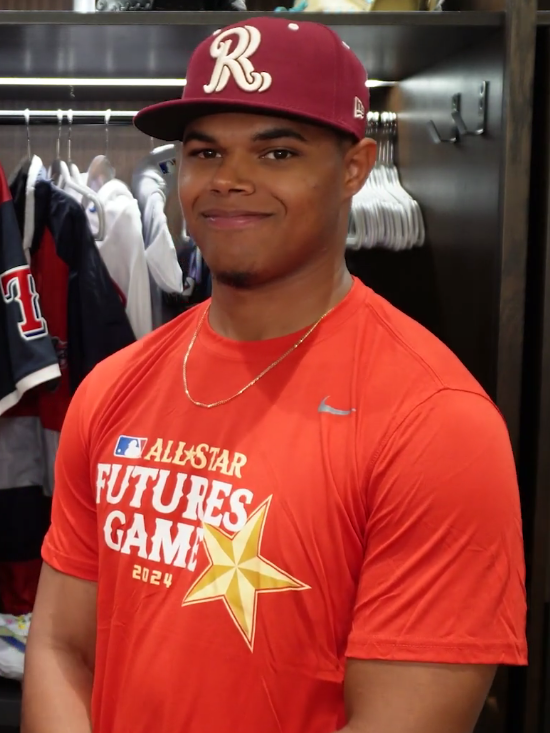
- Santos at the 2024 All-Star Futures Game

Texas Rangers – No. 47
- Pitcher
- Born: April 15, 2002 (age 24); Payita, Dominican Republic
- Bats: Right Throws: Right

MLB debut
- July 1, 2026, for the Texas Rangers

MLB statistics (through 2026 season)
- Win–loss record: 0–0
- Earned run average: 9.00
- Strikeouts: 1
- Stats at Baseball Reference

Teams
- Texas Rangers (2026–present)

Winston Santos (born April 15, 2002) is a Dominican professional baseball pitcher for the Texas Rangers of Major League Baseball (MLB). He made his MLB debut in 2026.

== Career ==
Santons signed with the Texas Rangers as an international free agent on July 2, 2019, for $10,000 signing bonus. He did not play in a game in 2020 due to the cancellation of the minor league season because of the COVID-19 pandemic. He split his debut season of 2021 between the DSL Rangers of the Rookie-level Dominican Summer League and the ACL Rangers of the Rookie-level Arizona Complex League, going a combined 2–2 with a 3.27 ERA and 36 strikeouts over 33 innings.

Santos spent the 2022 season with the Down East Wood Ducks of the Single–A Carolina League, going 7–6 with a 3.49 ERA and 108 strikeouts over 108 1/3 innings. Santos was promoted to the Hickory Crawdads of the High-A South Atlantic League for the 2023 season, going 7–9 with a 6.29 ERA and 88 strikeouts over 98 2/3 innings.

Santos returned to Hickory to open the 2024 season, going 6–3 with a 2.80 ERA and 81 strikeouts over 64 1/3 innings. He was promoted to the Frisco RoughRiders of the Double–A Texas League in June. Santos represented Texas at the 2024 All-Star Futures Game. Following the season, the Rangers added Santos to their 40-man roster to protect him from the Rule 5 draft.

Santos was optioned to Double-A Frisco to begin the 2025 season. He made six starts split between Frisco and the Triple-A Round Rock Express, recording a combined 6.75 ERA with 26 strikeouts across 17 1/3 innings pitched.

Santos was again optioned to Double-A Frisco to begin the 2026 season. In his first 11 starts for the RoughRiders, he logged a 1-3 record and 7.44 ERA with 58 strikeouts across 42 1/3 innings pitched. On June 24, 2026, Santos was promoted to the major leagues for the first time.
