= Gavin Collyer =

American baseball player (born 2001)

Texas Rangers – No. 65
- Pitcher
- Born: May 12, 2001 (age 25); Lawrenceville, Georgia, U.S.
- Bats: Right Throws: Right

MLB debut
- April 15, 2026, for the Texas Rangers

MLB statistics (through 2026 season)
- Win–loss record: 1–1
- Earned run average: 5.40
- Strikeouts: 23
- Stats at Baseball Reference

Teams
- Texas Rangers (2026–present)

Gavin Thomas Collyer (born May 12, 2001) is an American professional baseball pitcher for the Texas Rangers of Major League Baseball (MLB). He made his MLB debut in 2026.

== Career ==
Collyer attended Mountain View High School in Lawrenceville, Georgia. He had committed to play college baseball at Clemson University. Collyer was drafted by the Texas Rangers in the 12th round of the 2019 MLB draft, and signed with them for a $585,000 signing bonus.

Collyer made his professional debut in 2019 with the AZL Rangers of the Rookie-level Arizona League, going 1–1 with a 10.80 ERA over 5 innings. Collyer did not play professionally in 2020 due to the cancellation of the Minor League Baseball season because of the COVID-19 pandemic. He spent the 2021 season with the Down East Wood Ducks of the Low-A Carolina League, going 3–1 with a 3.33 ERA and 84 strikeouts over 73 innings. He split the 2022 season between Down East and the Hickory Crawdads of the High-A South Atlantic League, going a combined 6–5 with a 4.56 ERA and 115 strikeouts over 104 2/3 innings. Collyer again split the season between Down East and Hickory in 2023, going a combined 0–7 with a 5.33 ERA and 64 strikeouts over 54 innings. Collyer split the 2024 season between Hickory and the Frisco RoughRiders of the Double-A Texas League, going a combined 3–4 with a 3.71 ERA and 79 strikeouts over 51 innings. Collyer split the 2025 season between Frisco and the Round Rock Express of the Triple-A Pacific Coast League, going a combined 5–6 with a 4.40 ERA and 86 strikeouts over 61 1/3 innings. He elected free agency following the season on November 6, 2025.

On December 16, 2025, Collyer re-signed with Texas on a minor league contract that included an invitation to major league spring training. On April 15, 2026, Collyer was selected to the 40-man roster and promoted to the major leagues for the first time. Two days later, Collyer recorded his first MLB win after tossing 1 1/3 scoreless innings of relief against the Seattle Mariners.
