= List of Texas Rangers (baseball) broadcasters =

Texas Rangers games primarily air on the regional television network Rangers Sports Network. The Texas Rangers Radio Network has stations in Texas, Arkansas, Louisiana, and Oklahoma. The flagship station is 105.3 KRLD-FM in Dallas. When a Rangers game conflicts with other coverage on KRLD-FM, the baseball game moves to AM 1080 KRLD.

Games have aired on Spanish radio stations KESS from 1991 to 2010, KZMP from 2011 to 2016, and KFLC since 2017. Games are also heard on other Spanish-language radio stations in Texas and Arkansas. Games also previously aired in Spanish on television station Canal de Teja.

== Current radio broadcasters ==
- Eric Nadel, play-by-play (since 1979; 1980–present on radio; 1979–1981 on TV)
- Matt Hicks, secondary play-by-play (since 2012)
- Jared Sandler, studio host and fill-in play-by-play (since 2015; select games on TV, 2024-present)
- Ted Emrich, fill-in studio host and play-by-play (2025-present)
- Eleno Ornelas, Spanish play-by-play (since 2000)
- José Guzmán, Spanish color analyst (since 2015, 2004–2009 on radio, 2010–13 on TV)

== Current television broadcasters ==
- Dave Raymond, main play-by-play (since 2017); fill-in play-by-play (2016)
- Mike Bacsik, color analyst (since 2024)
- David Murphy, studio analyst (since 2017); color analyst (since 2019)
- Laura Stickells, field reporter (since 2025)
- Elvis Andrus, studio analyst (since 2025)
- Brad Miller, studio analyst (since 2025)

== All-time radio broadcasters ==
- Dave Raymond (2016) (fill-in play-by-play)
- Jared Sandler (2015–present) (studio host and fill-in play-by-play)
- Mike Peasley (2013–2014) (studio host and fill-in play-by-play)
- Bryan Dolgin (2011–2012) (studio host and fill-in play-by-play)
- Matt Hicks (2012–present) (secondary play-by-play)
- Steve Busby (May 2011–June 2012) (secondary play-by-play)
- Dave Barnett (2009–May 2011) (secondary play-by-play)
- Victor Rojas (2004–2008) (secondary play-by-play)
- Vince Cotroneo (1998–2003) (secondary play-by-play)
- Scott Franzke (1997–1998); (2002–2005) (studio host; fill-in play-by-play)
- Brad Sham (1995–1997) (secondary play-by-play)
- Mark Holtz (1982–1994) (primary play-by-play) (deceased)
- Mel Proctor (1980–1981) (secondary play-by-play)
- Eric Nadel (1980–present) (analyst/fill-in play-by-play (1980–81)); (secondary play-by-play) (1982-1994); (primary play-by-play) (1995–present) *Ford C. Frick Award winner, 2014
- Jon Miller (1978–1979) (primary play-by-play) *Ford C. Frick Award winner, 2010
- Bill Merrill (1974–1981) (secondary play-by-play)
- Dick Risenhoover (1973–1977) (secondary play-by-play (1973); (primary play-by-play) (1974–77))
- Don Drysdale (1972) (secondary play-by-play)
- Bill Mercer (1972–1973) (primary play-by-play)
- Zach Bigley (2023) (fill-in play-by-play)
- Ted Emrich (2025-present) (fill-in studio host and play-by-play)

== All-time TV broadcasters ==
- Brad Miller (2025-present) (studio analyst)
- Elvis Andrus (2025-present) (studio analyst)
- Laura Stickells (2025-present) (field reporter)
- Mike Bacsik (2024-present) (color analyst)
- Lesley McCaslin (2023-2025) (field reporter)
- Dave Valle (2022-2024) (color analyst)
- David Murphy (2019–present) (color analyst)
- C.J. Nitkowski (2017–2023) (color analyst; fill-in-play-by-play)
- Dave Raymond (2016–present) (play-by-play)
- Steve Busby (2012–2016) (play-by-play); (2016) (analyst); (1997–mid-2011) (studio host/analyst); (1990–94) (primary TV play-by-play); (1982–1989, 1995) (secondary TV play-by-play and analyst)
- Emily Jones (2013-2025) (field reporter)
- Mark McLemore (2012–2018?) (fill-in color analyst)
- John Rhadigan (March 2011–May 2011) (play-by-play)
- Jim Knox (2011-2016) (field reporter)
- Josh Lewin (2002-2010) (play-by-play)
- Bill Land (2002-2009) (field reporter)
- Bill Jones (May 1997 – 2001) (play-by-play)
- Tom Grieve (1995–2022) (color analyst; fill-in play-by-play)
- Norm Hitzges (1981; 1986–1989; 1991–1994) (color analyst)
- Jim Sundberg (1990–1995) (color analyst)
- Brad Sham (1990) (play-by-play)
- Dave Barnett (1990; 2011–June 2012) (play-by-play)
- Greg Lucas (1989–1994) (play-by-play)
- Bob Carpenter (1986–89) (play-by-play)
- Freddie Patek (1985) (color analyst)
- Phil Stone (1985) (play-by-play)
- Merle Harmon (1982–89) (play-by-play) (deceased)
- Mark Holtz (1981; 1984; 1995-May 1997) (play-by-play) (deceased)
- Mel Proctor (1980–81) (play-by-play)
- Eric Nadel (1979–81, 1984) (color analyst (1979); play-by-play (1980–81)) *Ford C. Frick Award winner, 2014
- Frank Glieber (1978–80) (play-by-play) (deceased)
- Jon Miller (1978–79) (play-by-play) *Ford C. Frick Award winner, 2010
- Tom Vandergriff (1975–77) (color analyst; play-by-play) (deceased)
- Burt Hawkins (1974) (play-by-play) (deceased)
- Jimmy Piersall (1974) (color analyst)
- Dick Risenhoover (1973–77) (play-by-play) (deceased)
- Tom Hedrick (1973) (play-by-play)
- Don Drysdale (1972) (color analyst; play-by-play) (deceased)
- Bill Mercer (1972) (play-by-play)
