= Mark Holtz =

American sportscaster

Holtz

Mark Holtz (October 1, 1945 – September 7, 1997) was an American sportscaster, best known for his broadcasts of Major League Baseball's Texas Rangers.

== Career ==
In 1981, he served as broadcaster on Rangers' cable games, then from 1982-1994 as play-by-play announcer on Rangers' radio broadcasts. Holtz and color commentator Eric Nadel, who joined him in 1982, became one of the most recognized broadcast teams in the DFW area.

Before joining the Rangers, Holtz was the voice of the Omaha Royals in 1971 and the Denver Bears from 1976 to 1980. Holtz was also the first radio broadcaster for the Dallas Mavericks NBA team in their inaugural season, 1980–81, and during his career called college football for the University of Colorado and University of Illinois, as well as college basketball for the University of Colorado and Bradley University and college ice hockey for the University of Denver.

In 1995, Holtz would return to TV broadcasting, where he remained until May 22, 1997, when he had to give up his duties to battle leukemia, which would claim his life on September 7 of that year.

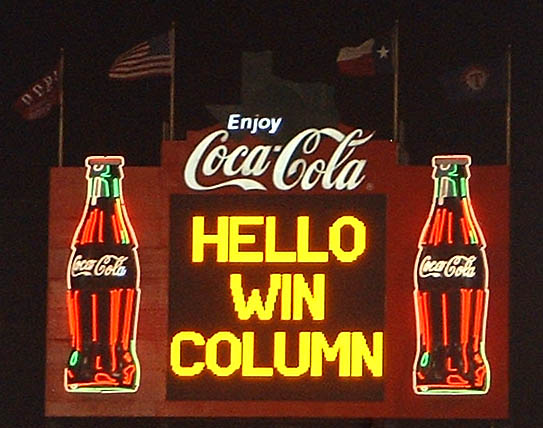
Holtz' signature phrase is displayed at Rangers Ballpark in Arlington after a Rangers win.

Holtz was well known for being able to keep people's interest in a game even when things were not going well, which was a frequent occurrence for the generally poor-performing team.

He was the voice of the Texas Rangers for their first ever playoff series, in 1996, against the New York Yankees. Holtz was also behind the microphone for Kenny Rogers' perfect game against the California Angels on July 28, 1994.

They are standing at the ballpark, it doesn't get any better than this! The count is at one, two out, 9th inning, perfect game, Kenny Rogers for the Rangers against Gary DiSarcina of the Angels. And the pitch...swung on, lined to center...Greer is there, he's calling...HE'S GOT IT!!! HELLO PERFECT GAME!!! Kenny Rogers, mobbed on the mound! 27 up, 27 down! On July 28, Kenny Rogers has pitched the first perfect game in Texas Ranger history! The bench has erupted, they have mobbed Kenny Rogers...what a scene in the first year of the Ballpark in Arlington! The Rangers have won it, 4 to nothing!

== Death and remembrance ==
Holtz began every home Rangers broadcast by jubilantly stating that "It's baseball time in Texas!" This phrase is still often used throughout the Rangers Ballpark by everybody from scoreboard operators to public address announcer Chuck Morgan. Holtz' signature closing phrase was "Hello Win Column", which he would exclaim after every Rangers win. He was able to use this phrase on May 22, 1997, his last game as broadcaster, as the Rangers won that evening.

In his memory, Mark Holtz Lake (a wide spot in Johnson Creek north of Rangers Ballpark in Arlington) is named for him. And after every Rangers home win, the center-field scoreboard still flashes his signature phrase "Hello Win Column."

Thousands of Texas Rangers fans camped around Mark Holtz Lake for playoff tickets in 1996, 1998, and 1999.

When the Rangers beat the Tampa Bay Rays in Game 5 of the ALDS on October 12, 2010, to capture their first postseason series victory, Eric Nadel exclaimed, "Hello Win Column!" on the Rangers radio broadcast. It was the first time Nadel used the phrase since Holtz's passing. Nadel again used the phrase on October 22, 2010, when the Rangers beat the Yankees in the ALCS, earning their first trip to the World Series.
