= Matt Hicks =

American sports announcer

Matt Hicks is a sports broadcaster who calls Texas Rangers games alongside Eric Nadel on the radio.

== Broadcasting career ==
In the middle of the 2012 season, Hicks joined the Rangers after spending 10 years with the Corpus Christi Hooks. He replaced Steve Busby, who replaced Dave Barnett as the primary television play-by-play announcer for the Rangers due to Barnett's health issues. Before the 2013 season, Hicks' promotion was made permanent.

Before his tenure with the Hooks, he was also the voice of the El Paso Diablos and the Frederick Keys. He also called the Houston Astros minor league game of the week on Fox Sports Southwest.

Outside of baseball, Hicks called high school football for the Texas Sports Radio Network, professional ice hockey for the El Paso Buzzards, and worked at the collegiate level with the Texas A&M Aggies, Mount St. Mary's Mountaineers, James Madison Dukes, UTEP Miners, New Mexico State Aggies, and Maryland Terrapins, primarily in football, basketball, baseball, and lacrosse.

== Personal ==
Hicks graduated from the University of Maryland in 1983. Outside of his broadcasting duties, he serves as a chess instructor, basketball referee, and swimming meet timer.
