= Eric Nadel =

American sports announcer (born 1951)

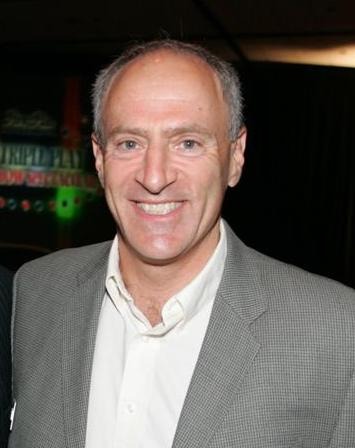
- Nadel in 2006
- Born: May 16, 1951 (age 75)
- Education: Brown University
- Sports commentary career
- Team: Texas Rangers (1979–present)
- Genre: Play-by-play
- Sport: Baseball

Eric Nadel (born May 16, 1951) is an American sports announcer on radio broadcasts for the Texas Rangers baseball organization. In 2014, he was honored with the Ford C. Frick Award for broadcasting excellence by the National Baseball Hall of Fame and Museum.

== Biography ==
Nadel grew up in Brooklyn, New York, as a fan of the Brooklyn Dodgers, though it was listening to a New York Yankees broadcast from Mel Allen and Red Barber that first sparked his interest in sportscasting when he was eight years old. He developed his skills at Brown University (class of 1972), announcing hockey and football games on radio station WBRU. He had minor league hockey play-by-play stints in Muskegon, Oklahoma City, and Dallas, and was also the radio voice of the Dallas Diamonds of the Women's Professional Basketball League.

The Rangers hired Nadel in 1979, and he called games on television and radio in his first three seasons. Beginning in 1982, he began a 13-year run with Mark Holtz as the radio team on WBAP, returning to the television booth for one year in 1984. Nadel became the team's lead radio voice when Holtz moved to television in 1995. Since becoming the primary play-by-play voice for the Rangers, Nadel has worked alongside Brad Sham, Vince Cotroneo, and Victor Rojas.

In May 2006, Nadel announced that he had signed a "lifetime contract" with the Rangers, allowing him to continue on their broadcast team until he chooses to retire. He later said that he hopes to outlive his contract. Beginning in 2009, he was partnered with longtime ESPN and former Dallas Mavericks and San Antonio Spurs announcer Dave Barnett, who also did Rangers games on television with Brad Sham in the late 80s and early 90s. After Barnett moved to television, former MLB pitcher Steve Busby was Nadel's partner. Since July 2012 after Busby replaced Barnett on television, Nadel has been joined by Matt Hicks in the radio booth. Rangers games are now primarily on 105.3 The Fan, which has been the Rangers' flagship station since the 2015 season. At the conclusion of the 2018 season, Nadel joined a handful of broadcasters to call Major League Baseball games for 40 years, with the added distinction of calling all of them for one franchise. Among Nadel's most memorable calls was the 5000th strikeout of Nolan Ryan's career on August 22, 1989. His main home run call is "That ball is history!" Both he and Public Address (PA) announcer Chuck Morgan have been affectionately referred to as "the Voice[s] of the Texas Rangers".

The arrival of Rubén Sierra in Texas motivated Nadel to learn Spanish. Nadel is now a fluent Spanish speaker, having taken part in Spanish-language game broadcasts in a number of Latin American countries.

Nadel took a leave of absence through the first 109 games of the 2023 season, in order to seek treatment for anxiety, depression, and insomnia. He returned to the booth in August, and called the Rangers' first World Series win that November.

"Sborz kicks and fires - he struck him out looking! It's over! It's over! The Rangers have won the World Series! Ranger fans, you're not dreaming - the Rangers are the World Series champions! After 52 years in Texas, 63 years of the franchise, the wait is over, and the celebration has begun! ... May the ghosts of 2011 be forever erased!"

— Eric Nadel's call of the final out of the 2023 World Series

== Awards ==
In 1991, Nadel was inducted into the Texas Baseball Hall of Fame. He has received the National Sportscasters and Sportswriters Association Texas Sportscaster of the Year Award seven times (1999, 2001, 2002, 2006, 2009, 2010, 2011) and won the Associated Press award for Best Play-by-Play in Texas three times. On August 11, 2012, Nadel became the 15th member inducted into the Texas Rangers Hall of Fame.

On December 11, 2013, Nadel was selected as the 2014 recipient of the Ford C. Frick Award, presented annually for excellence in broadcasting by the National Baseball Hall of Fame and Museum. Nadel received the award at a ceremony at Doubleday Field on Saturday, July 26, 2014, as part of the Hall of Fame 2014 weekend festivities.

In recognition of his achievements, Nadel's high school alma mater, Midwood High School at Brooklyn College, has created the Eric Nadel Memorial Award for Athletic Improvement and Character. It will be awarded annually to a deserving student athlete.

On January 21, 2023, Eric was awarded the Shalom Award by the Temple Shalom Brotherhood in recognition of his many years of community service and humanitarian work.

== Other work ==
Nadel appeared as the Rangers' radio announcer in the film The Rookie in 2002.

Nadel is active in animal causes and was one of the founders of the first leash-free dog park in the DFW Metroplex at White Rock Lake in Dallas. He stages benefit concerts for non-profit organizations, including Focus on Teens and Cafe Momentum, and is an active advocate for mental health organizations such as NAMI and The Campaign to Change Direction. In 2018, The Intercept reported on Nadel's longtime advocacy for Wendell Lindsey, a Texas inmate who has maintained his innocence for a murder conviction in 1991.

== Personal life ==
Nadel married his wife Jeannie in 1987.

== Bibliography ==
- Nadel, Eric. The Night Wilt Scored 100: Tales from Basketball's Past. New York: Taylor Publishing, 1990. (ISBN 0-87833-662-1)
- Nadel, Eric. The Texas Rangers : The Authorized History. New York: Taylor Trade Publishing, 1997. (ISBN 0-87833-139-5)
- Nadel, Eric and Craig R. Wright. The Man Who Stole First Base: Tales from Baseball's Past. New York: Taylor Publishing, 1989. (ISBN 0-87833-633-8)
- Nadel, Eric (author) and Arthur James (illustrator). LIM-ERIC!: Whimsical Rhymes From the Voice of the Texas Rangers and his Friends. Dallas: Principto Publishing LLC, 2018, (ISBN 978-1732892705)
