= Texas Rangers (baseball) =

Major League Baseball franchise in Arlington, Texas

- 2026 Texas Rangers season

| Logo | Cap insignia |
- Established in 1961; Based in Arlington since 1972

Major league affiliations
- American League (1961–present); West Division (1972–present); East Division (1969–1971)

Current uniform
- Retired numbers: 7; 10; 26; 29; 34; 42

Colors
- Blue, red, white

Name
- Texas Rangers (1972–present); Washington Senators (1961–1971)

Ballpark
- Globe Life Field (2020–present); The Ballpark in Arlington (1994–2019); Arlington Stadium (1972–1993); Robert F. Kennedy Memorial Stadium (1962–1971); Griffith Stadium (1961)

Major league titles
- World Series titles (1): 2023
- AL pennants (3): 2010; 2011; 2023
- West division titles (7): 1996; 1998; 1999; 2010; 2011; 2015; 2016
- Wild card berths (2): 2012; 2023

Front office
- Principal owners: Rangers Baseball Express, LLC (Ray Davis and Bob R. Simpson, co-chairmen)
- President: Neil Leibman
- President of baseball operations: Chris Young
- General manager: Ross Fenstermaker
- Manager: Skip Schumaker
- Website: mlb.com/rangers

The Texas Rangers are an American professional baseball team based in the Dallas–Fort Worth metroplex. The Rangers compete in Major League Baseball (MLB) as a member club of the American League (AL) West Division. The team was founded as the Washington Senators in 1961, an expansion team awarded to Washington, D.C., after the previous Senators incarnation moved to Minneapolis to become the Minnesota Twins. The new Senators relocated to Arlington, Texas, after the 1971 season and debuted as the Rangers the next spring. In 2020, the Rangers moved to the new Globe Life Field after having played at Globe Life Park (Choctaw Stadium) from 1994 to 2019. They are one of two major league clubs based in Texas; the Houston Astros belong to the same division. The team's name derives from a historic law enforcement agency.

The Rangers have made nine appearances in the MLB postseason (all as the Rangers—in their iteration as the Washington Senators, the team never made the postseason). Seven of these followed division championships in 1996, 1998, 1999, 2010, 2011, 2015, and 2016; the remaining two were as a wild card team in 2012 and 2023. Until 2010, the Rangers were the only MLB team never to have advanced past the first round of the playoffs. In 2010, the Rangers advanced past the Division Series for the first time, defeating the Tampa Bay Rays. The team then won its first American League pennant, beating the New York Yankees in six games; league MVP Josh Hamilton won the first ALCS MVP award for a Ranger player. In their first appearance in a World Series, the Rangers fell to the San Francisco Giants in five games. They repeated as American League champions in 2011, but lost the World Series to the St. Louis Cardinals in seven games after twice being one strike away from winning the series in game six. The Rangers made it to the 2023 World Series and won their first championship, defeating the Arizona Diamondbacks in five games. Corey Seager was the first Ranger player to win the World Series Most Valuable Player Award.

From 1961 through 2025, the franchise's overall win–loss record is 4,899–5,383–6 (.476). Since moving to Texas in 1972, the Rangers have an overall win–loss record of 4,239–4,433–5 (.489) through 2026.

== History ==
=== Washington Senators (1961–1971) ===
When the original Washington Senators announced their move to Minnesota to become the Twins in 1961, Major League Baseball decided to expand a year earlier than planned to stave off the twin threats of competition from the proposed Continental League and loss of its exemption from the Sherman Antitrust Act. As part of the expansion, the American League added two expansion teams for the 1961 season–the Los Angeles Angels and a new Washington Senators team. The new Senators and Angels began to fill their rosters with American League players in an expansion draft. The team played their inaugural season at old Griffith Stadium, then moved to the new District of Columbia Stadium in 1962 under a ten-year lease.

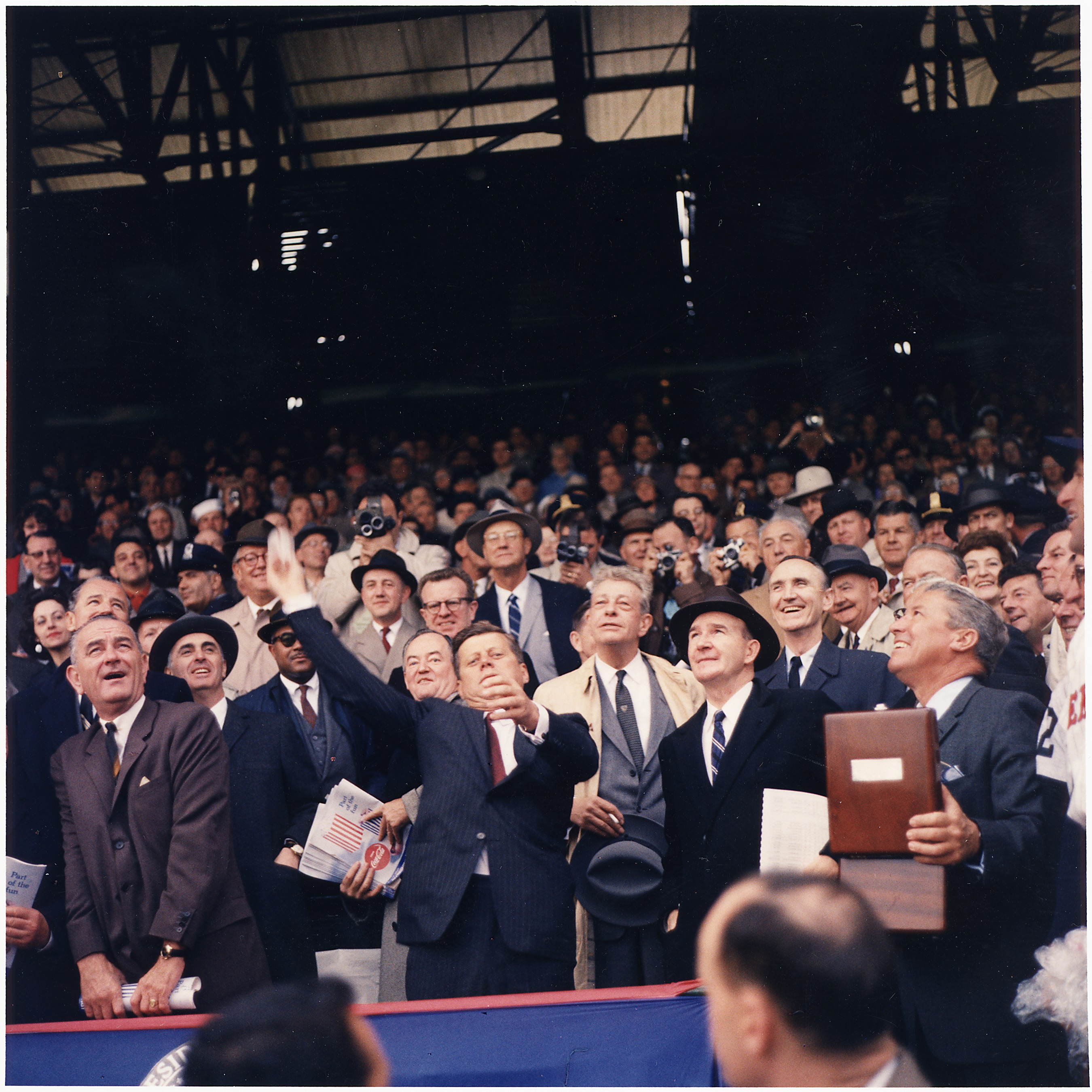
President John F. Kennedy throws out the ceremonial first pitch before the first game in Senators/Rangers franchise history at Griffith Stadium on April 10, 1961.

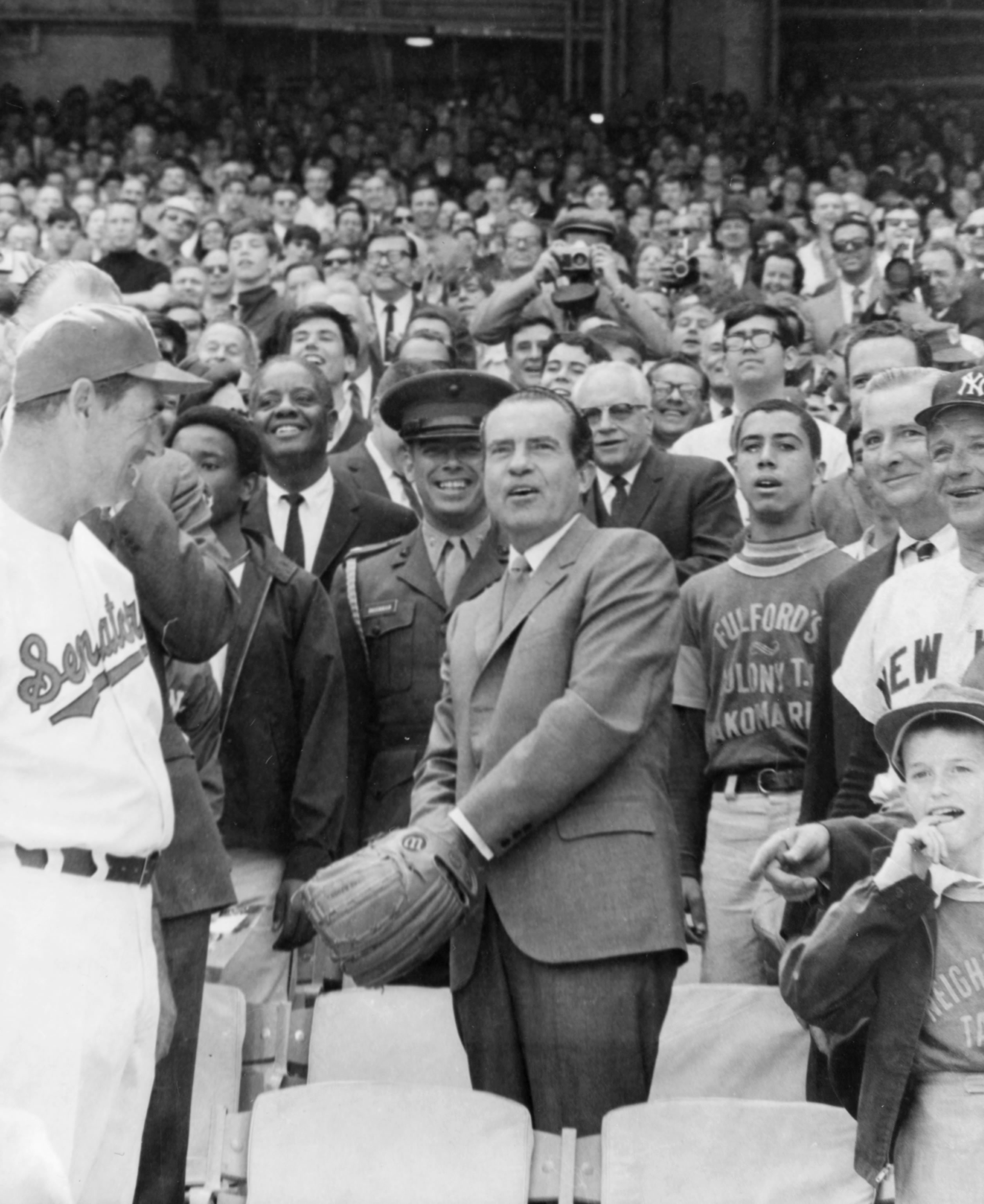
Richard Nixon throwing the Opening Day ceremonial first pitch at RFK Stadium on April 1969, with Ted Williams (left) and Bob Short (right, partially obscured by Ralph Houk)

For most of their existence, the new Senators epitomized futility, losing an average of 90 games a season. The team's struggles led to a twist on a joke about the old Senators: "Washington: first in war, first in peace and still last in the American League." Frank Howard, an outfielder/first baseman from 1965 to 1972 known for his towering home runs, was the team's most accomplished player, winning two home run titles.

The concurrent rise of the nearby Baltimore Orioles to regular championship contenders (winning their first World Series in 1966) certainly did not help the Senators draw crowds. Further expansion and re-alignment in 1969 did not do much to help the Senators either, since (unlike the National League) the AL owners elected to align their new divisions strictly based on geography. This arrangement placed both expansion teams (the Seattle Pilots and the Kansas City Royals) in the AL West, while pitting last place Washington against the AL's five best teams in the AL East. Despite this, the Senators managed a winning season in 1969 (their only winning record in the nation's capital) when Hall of Famer Ted Williams managed the club to an 86–76 finish, good enough for fourth in the AL East.

Ownership changed hands several times during the franchise's stay in Washington and was often plagued by poor decision-making and planning. Following their brief success in 1969, owner Bob Short was forced to make many questionable trades to lower the debt he had incurred to pay for the team in late 1968; the purchase price was reported at $9.4 million. By the end of the 1970 campaign, Short had issued an ultimatum: unless someone was willing to buy the Senators for $12 million (by comparison, the New York Yankees were sold in 1973 for $8.8 million), he would not renew the stadium lease and would move the team elsewhere.

At first, it looked like a move to Buffalo, New York, was in the works as at the time, a proposed multi-use stadium was in the cards in either downtown Buffalo where the current KeyBank Center is, or in suburban Lancaster to share with the Buffalo Bills; however, the project went over budget and the Senators started to look elsewhere while the Bills opened up Rich Stadium instead. Short was especially receptive to an offer brought up by Arlington, Texas, mayor Tom Vandergriff, who had been trying to obtain a major league sports team to play in the Metroplex for over a decade. Years earlier, Charles O. Finley, the owner of the Kansas City Athletics, sought to relocate his baseball team to Dallas, but the idea was rebuffed and ultimately declined by the other AL team owners (the A's ultimately moved to Oakland, California in 1968). Arlington's hole card was Turnpike Stadium, a 10,000-seat park built in 1965 to house the Double-A Dallas–Fort Worth Spurs of the Texas League. However, it had been built to MLB specifications, and only minor excavations would be necessary to expand the park to accommodate major league crowds.

Vandergriff's offer of a multimillion-dollar down payment prompted Short to make the move to Arlington. On September 21, 1971, American League owners voted 10–2 to allow the move of the franchise to Arlington for the 1972 season. Senators fans were livid, and enmity came to a head at the club's last game in Washington on Thursday, September 30. Thousands simply walked in without paying after the security guards left early, swelling the paid attendance of 14,460 to around 25,000, while fans unfurled a "SHORT STINKS" banner. With two outs in the top of the ninth inning and the Senators leading 7–5, several hundred youths stormed the field, raiding it for souvenirs. One man grabbed first base and ran off with it. With no security in sight and only three bases, umpire crew chief Jim Honochick forfeited the game to the New York Yankees.

The nation's capital went without Major League Baseball for 33 years until the National League's Montreal Expos became the Washington Nationals in 2005.

=== Texas Rangers (1972–present) ===
==== Naming of the Rangers ====
After moving from Washington, the Senators were renamed after the Texas Rangers, the state-wide investigative law-enforcement agency founded by Stephen F. Austin in 1823 when Texas was part of Mexico, whose mythology led to fictional characters such as The Lone Ranger and Walker, Texas Ranger.

==== First years in Texas (1972–1984) ====
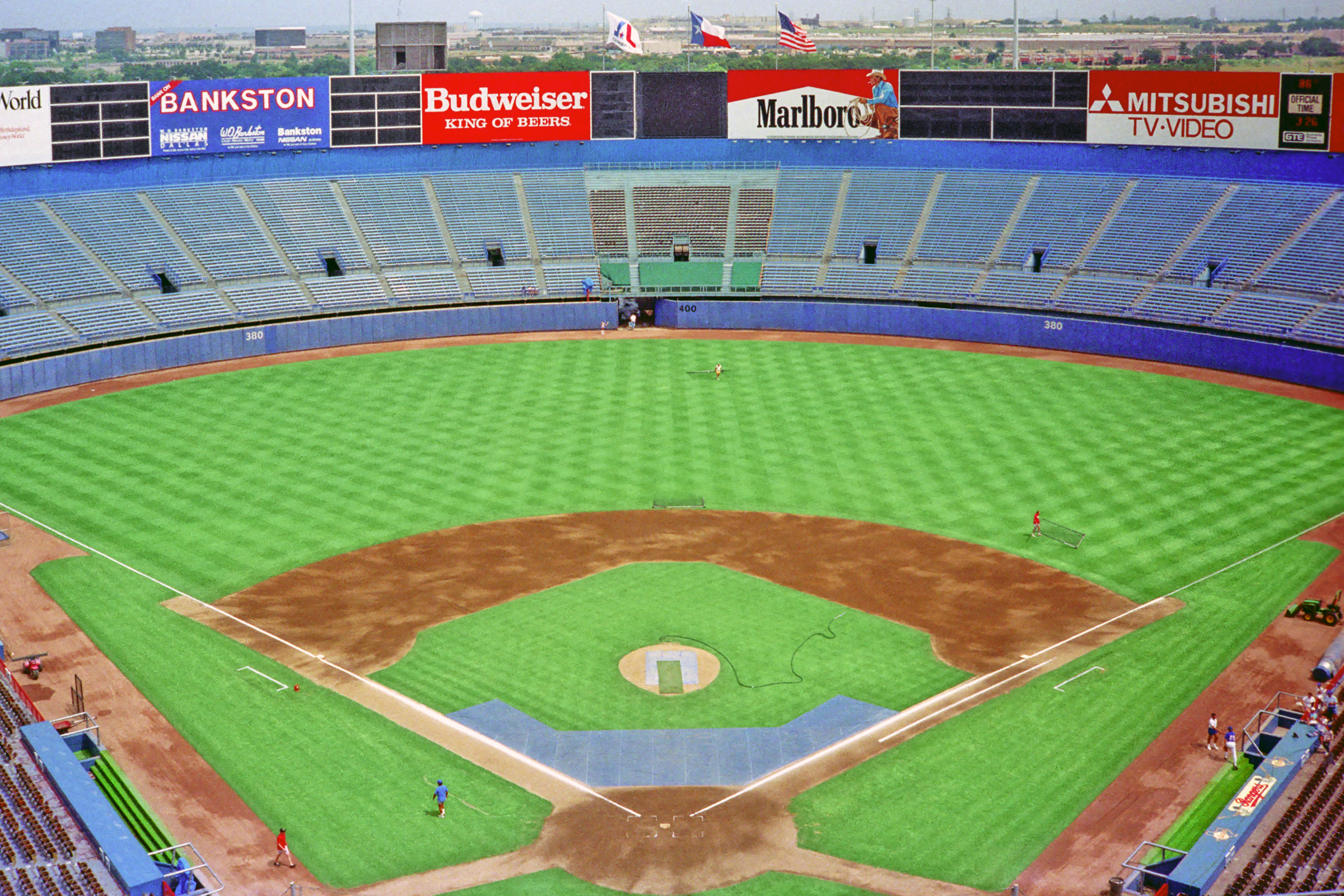
Arlington Stadium, home ballpark from 1972 to 1993

Before the 1972 season, improvements were made to Turnpike Stadium, which reopened as Arlington Stadium, in preparation for the Rangers' inaugural season. The team played its first game on April 15, 1972, a 1–0 loss to the California Angels, their 1961 expansion cousins. The next day, the Rangers defeated the Angels, 5–1, for the club's first victory.

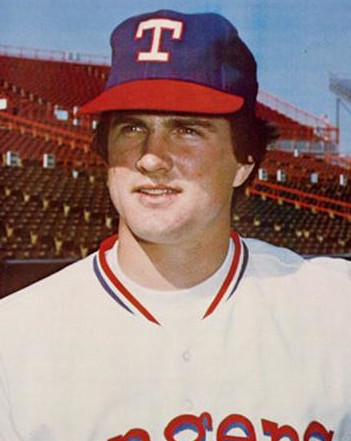
Jim Sundberg, catcher during 1974–1983 and 1988–1989

In 1974, the Rangers had their first winning season after finishing last in both 1972 and 1973. Under the ownership of Brad Corbett, they finished second in the American League West with an 84–76 record, behind the eventual World Series champion Oakland Athletics. The 1974 Rangers are still the only MLB team to finish above .500 after two consecutive 100-loss seasons. Mike Hargrove was awarded American League Rookie of the Year, Billy Martin was named AL Manager of the Year, Jeff Burroughs won AL MVP, and Ferguson Jenkins was named the Comeback Player of the Year after winning 25 games, still a club record. The team posted winning records again from 1977 to 1979 but fell short of reaching the playoffs. The Rangers came very close to clinching a playoff spot in 1981, but lost the first half of the AL West by one-and-a-half games to Oakland at the time of the players' strike. Texas finished under .500 each season through 1985.

The Rangers faced an attendance problem for a few years due to both the team's inconsistent performance and the oppressive heat and humidity that can encompass the area in the summer. Until the Florida Marlins arrived in 1993, Arlington Stadium was often the hottest stadium in the majors, with temperatures often topping 100 °F (38 °C) in the summer. So the Rangers began playing most of their weekend games between May and September at night, a tradition that continued for years.

==== Valentine, Ryan, and Bush (1985–1994) ====
Manager Bobby Valentine became steward over an influx of talent in the late 1980s and early 1990s. A winning season in 1986 was a shock to pundits and fans alike as the Rangers remained in the race for the American League pennant for the entire season. With a team consisting of stellar young rookies such as Rubén Sierra, Pete Incaviglia, Mitch Williams, Bobby Witt, and Edwin Correa, the Rangers finished the season in second place with an 87–75 record, just five games behind the division champion Angels. The season marked a dramatic 25-win improvement over the 1985 season, which resulted in yet another last place finish in the West.

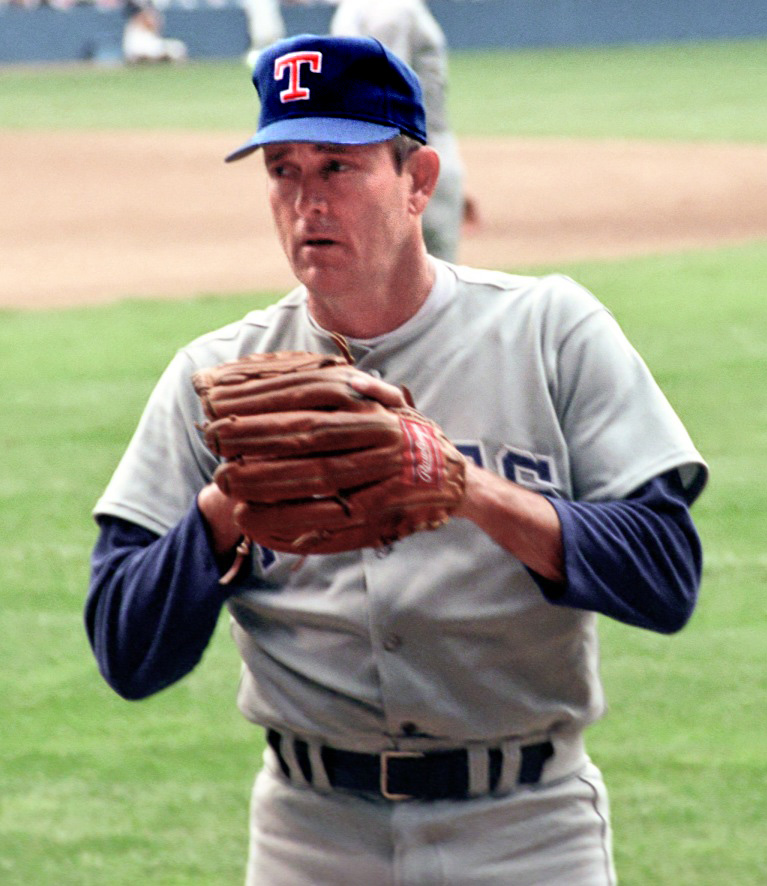
Nolan Ryan, Rangers pitcher from 1989 to 1993

The signing of 41-year-old star pitcher Nolan Ryan prior to the 1989 season allowed Ryan to reach his 5,000th strikeout, 300th win, and 6th and 7th no-hitters with the Rangers. Despite powerful lineups including Juan González, Rubén Sierra, Julio Franco, and Rafael Palmeiro and a pitching staff that also included Charlie Hough, Bobby Witt, Kevin Brown, and Kenny Rogers, Valentine's Rangers never finished above second place and he was relieved of his duties during the 1992 season.

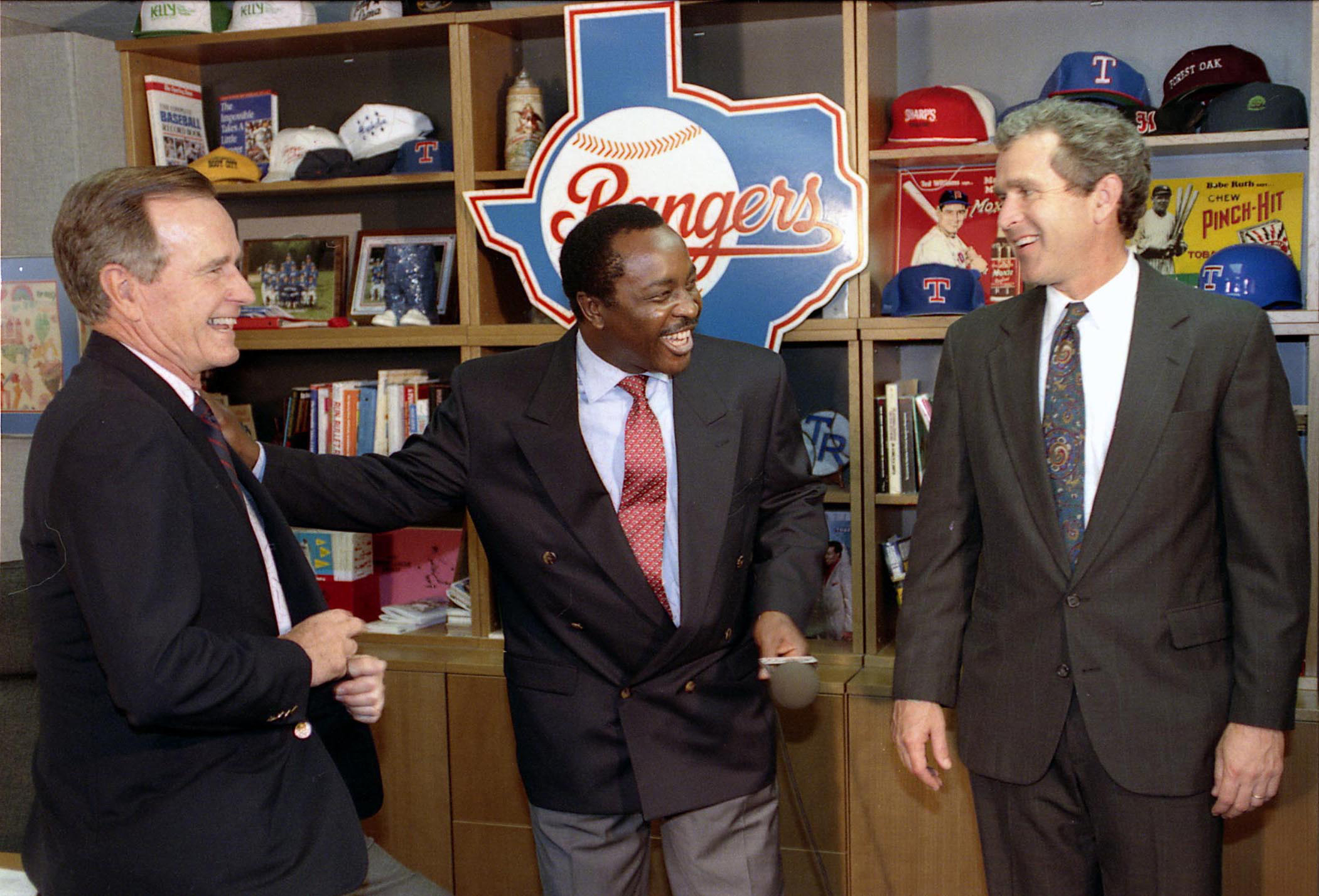
Rangers owner George W. Bush (right) and his father, President George H. W. Bush (left), with Joe Morgan (center), 1991

In April 1989, Rangers owner and oil tycoon Eddie Chiles sold the team to an investment group headed by George W. Bush for $89 million. While his own equity in the team was small ($500,000), Bush was named managing general partner of the new ownership group. He increased his investment to $600,000 the next year. Bush left his position with the Rangers when he was elected Governor of Texas in 1994, and sold his stake in the team in 1998.

During Bush's tenure, the Rangers and the City of Arlington decided to replace the aging Arlington Stadium with a new publicly funded stadium at a cost of $193 million, financed by Arlington residents through a sales tax increase. Ground was broken on October 30, 1991, on what became The Ballpark in Arlington (now named Choctaw Stadium).

In 1993, Kevin Kennedy took over managerial duties, presiding over the team for two seasons, keeping the 1993 Rangers in the hunt for a playoff berth into mid-September; Nolan Ryan also retired after that season. Kennedy was let go in 1994, although the team led the AL West until the players' strike prompted commissioner Bud Selig to cancel the remainder of the season and the playoffs. On July 28, Kenny Rogers pitched the 12th perfect game in major league history in Arlington against the California Angels.

==== First division titles (1995–2000) ====
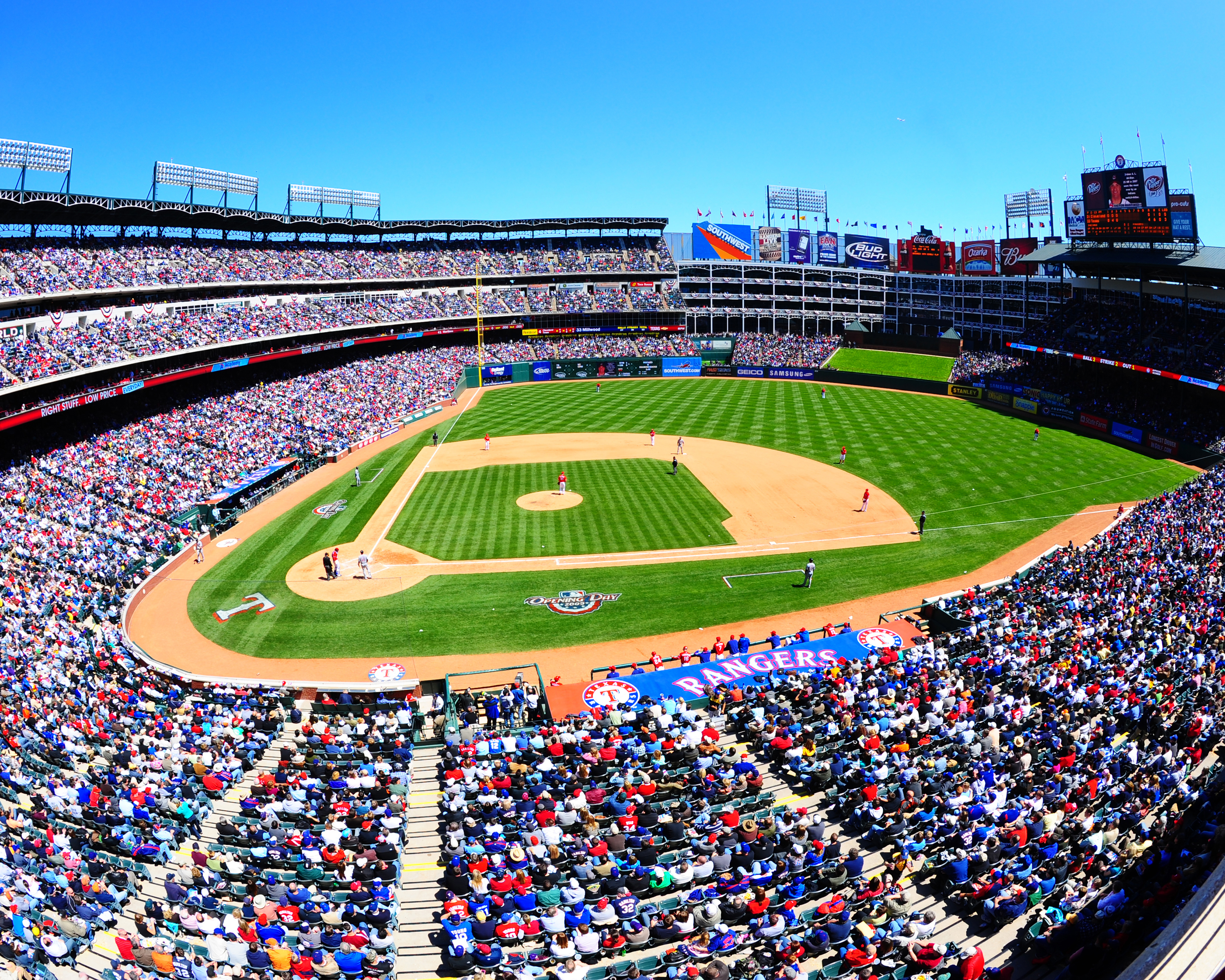
The Ballpark in Arlington in 2009

Johnny Oates was hired as the Rangers' manager in 1995. Oates and company helped to bring home the 1996 AL Western Division Championship, the first division championship in franchise history. The first playoff series, 24 years after the franchise came to Texas, saw the Rangers lose to the New York Yankees, 3 games to 1. Oates was named AL Manager of the Year and Juan González was named AL MVP. The team featured a powerful lineup of hitters including González, Iván Rodríguez, and Rusty Greer, but continued to struggle with pitching despite having Rick Helling and Aaron Sele on its roster. Oates led the team to consecutive AL West championships in 1998 and 1999. Neither of Oates's last two playoff teams could win a single game, losing all six in back-to-back sweeps to the Yankees, a team that won three World Series in the 1990s after defeating Rangers teams in the first round. The 1999 team was the last playoff-bound team until 2010. En route to a second straight last-place finish, Oates resigned 28 games into the 2001 season.

In 1998, venture capital billionaire Tom Hicks bought the team for $250 million.

==== The lean years and the A-Rod era (2001–2004) ====
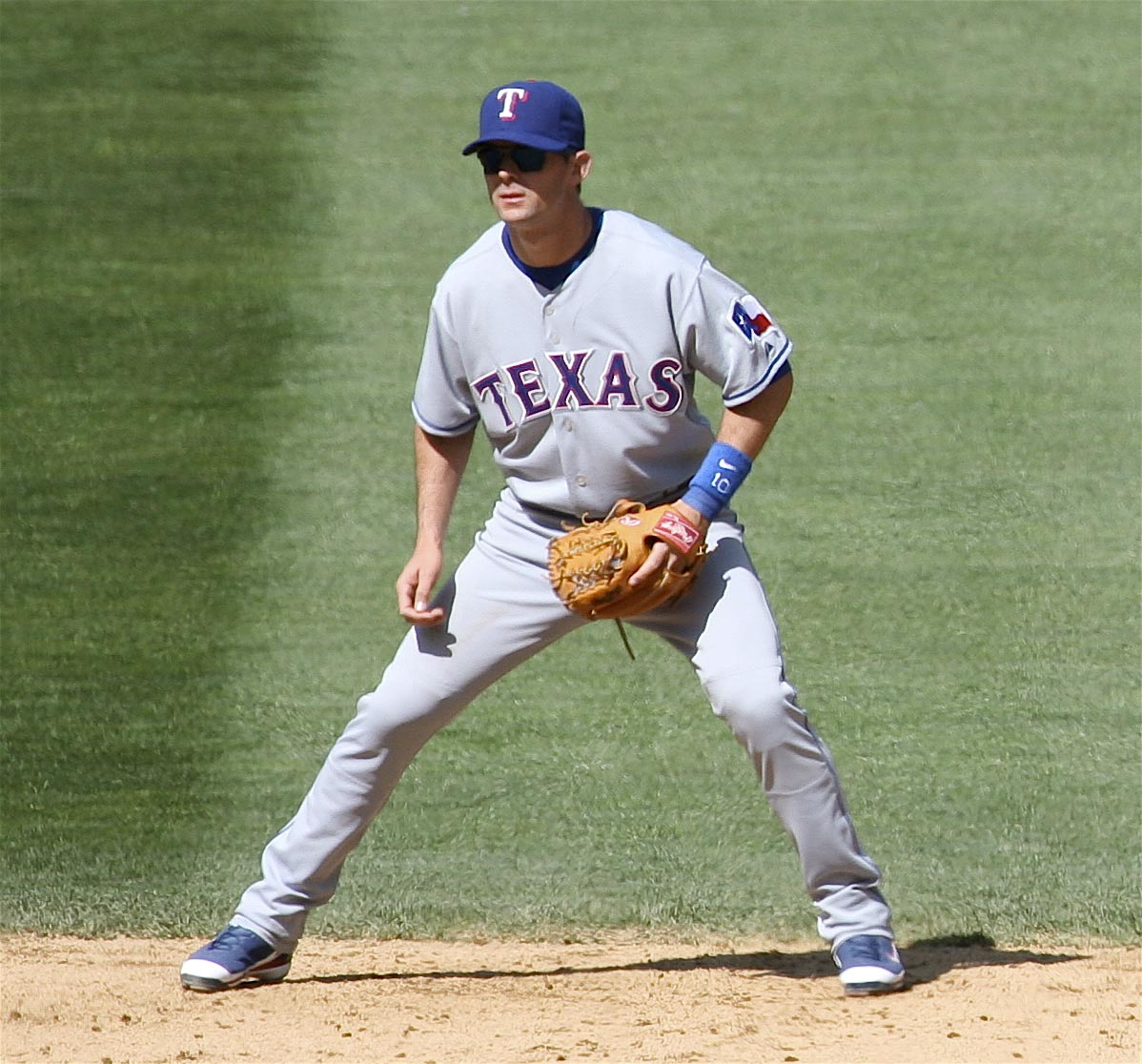
Michael Young was selected for the MLB All-Star Game seven times (2004–2009, 2011).

Before the 2001 season, the Rangers signed star free agent shortstop Alex Rodriguez in the most lucrative deal in baseball history: a 10-year, $252 million contract. The move was controversial and is frequently maligned by fans and writers who thought Hicks was placing too much emphasis on one player instead of using resources to acquire several players, especially since the team lacked pitching talent. Club officials maintained that Rodriguez would be the cornerstone of future postseason success. Rodriguez's performance was outstanding, but the Rangers continued to struggle, and manager Jerry Narron was fired after the 2002 season and replaced by seasoned manager Buck Showalter. The 2003 season saw the Rangers' fourth straight last-place finish, and after a postseason fallout between Rodriguez and club management, he was traded to the Yankees for second baseman Alfonso Soriano and infield prospect Joaquín Árias.

The Rangers battled with the Anaheim Angels and Oakland Athletics for first place in the AL West for much of the 2004 season. Soriano, Mark Teixeira, Michael Young, and Hank Blalock became some of the league's best-hitting infielders, with Young, Blalock, and Soriano selected for the 2004 All-Star Game. Soriano was named the All-Star MVP after going 2 for 3 with a three-run homer. Despite a late-season push, the Rangers lost six of their final ten games and finished in third place behind the Angels and A's, three games out of first place.

==== Making changes (2005–2009) ====
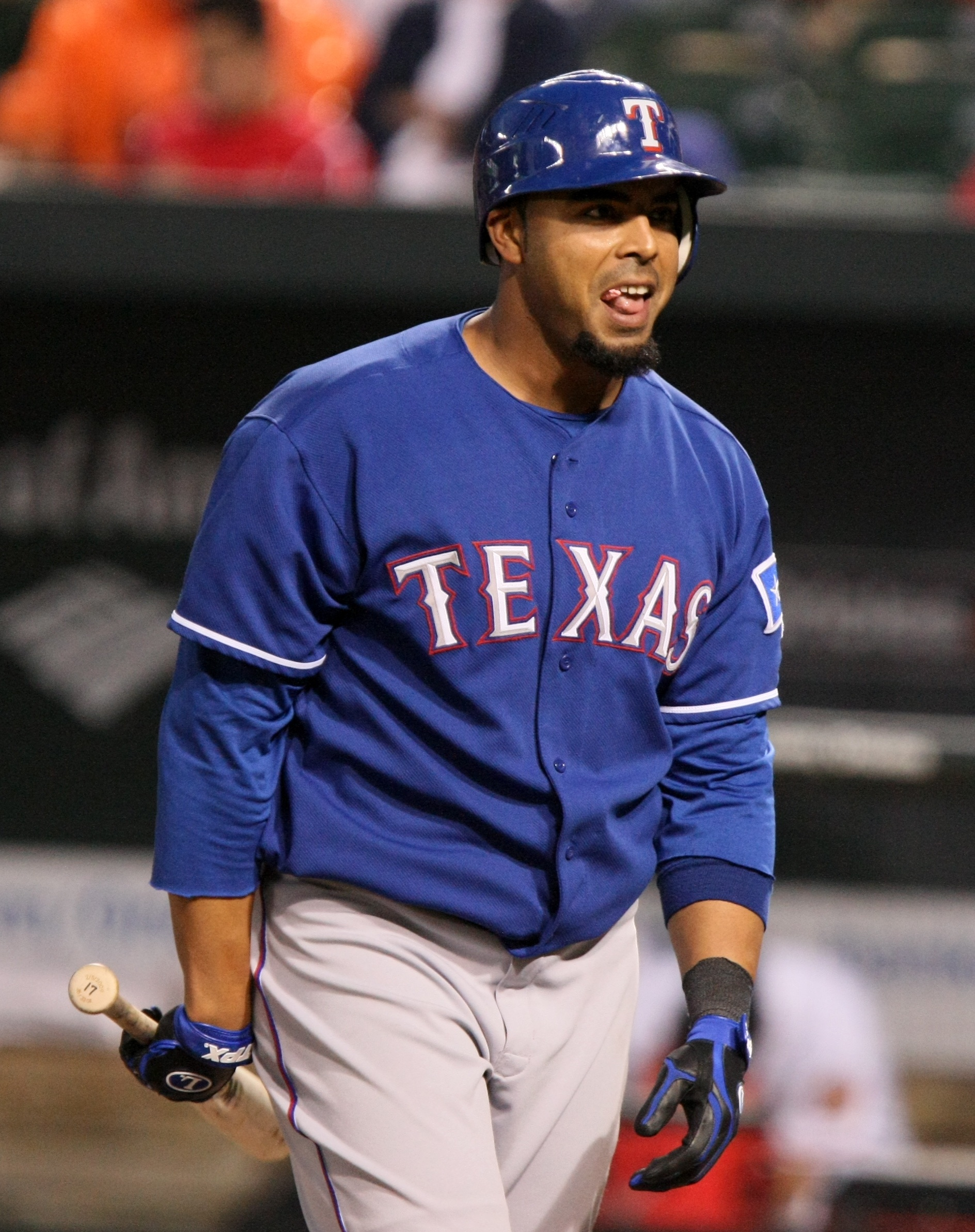
Nelson Cruz, Rangers outfielder from 2006 to 2013

In 2005, the Rangers again struggled to find consistency amid controversy and injuries. John Hart stepped down as general manager following the 2005 season. Jon Daniels was promoted from assistant general manager to replace him. Daniels, at 28 years and one month, became the youngest general manager in major league history.

Daniels and the Rangers front office were very active in acquiring new players before and during the 2006 season. New acquisitions included Brad Wilkerson, Adam Eaton, Kevin Millwood, Carlos Lee, and Nelson Cruz. Despite bolstering their roster, the Rangers' 2006 season ended with a disappointing 80–82 record and a third-place finish in the AL West. Buck Showalter was dismissed as manager after the season. The team hired Oakland third base coach Ron Washington as their next manager. A change at manager was the first of several moves to strengthen the team in yet another busy offseason. The team lost Gary Matthews, Jr., Mark DeRosa, Carlos Lee, and Adam Eaton, but gained Kenny Lofton, Sammy Sosa, Frank Catalanotto, and pitchers Éric Gagné and Brandon McCarthy.

The Rangers struggled offensively early in the 2007 season, despite playing in a notoriously hitter-friendly park. A number of roster moves before the 2007 trade deadline were the beginnings of a rebuilding project headed by Jon Daniels with a focus on the acquisition and development of young players. In the coming years, more club resources would be dedicated to improving the quality of the farm system and scouting departments, most notably in Latin America and the Far East. Daniels' objective was to field a legitimately competitive team by the 2010 season.

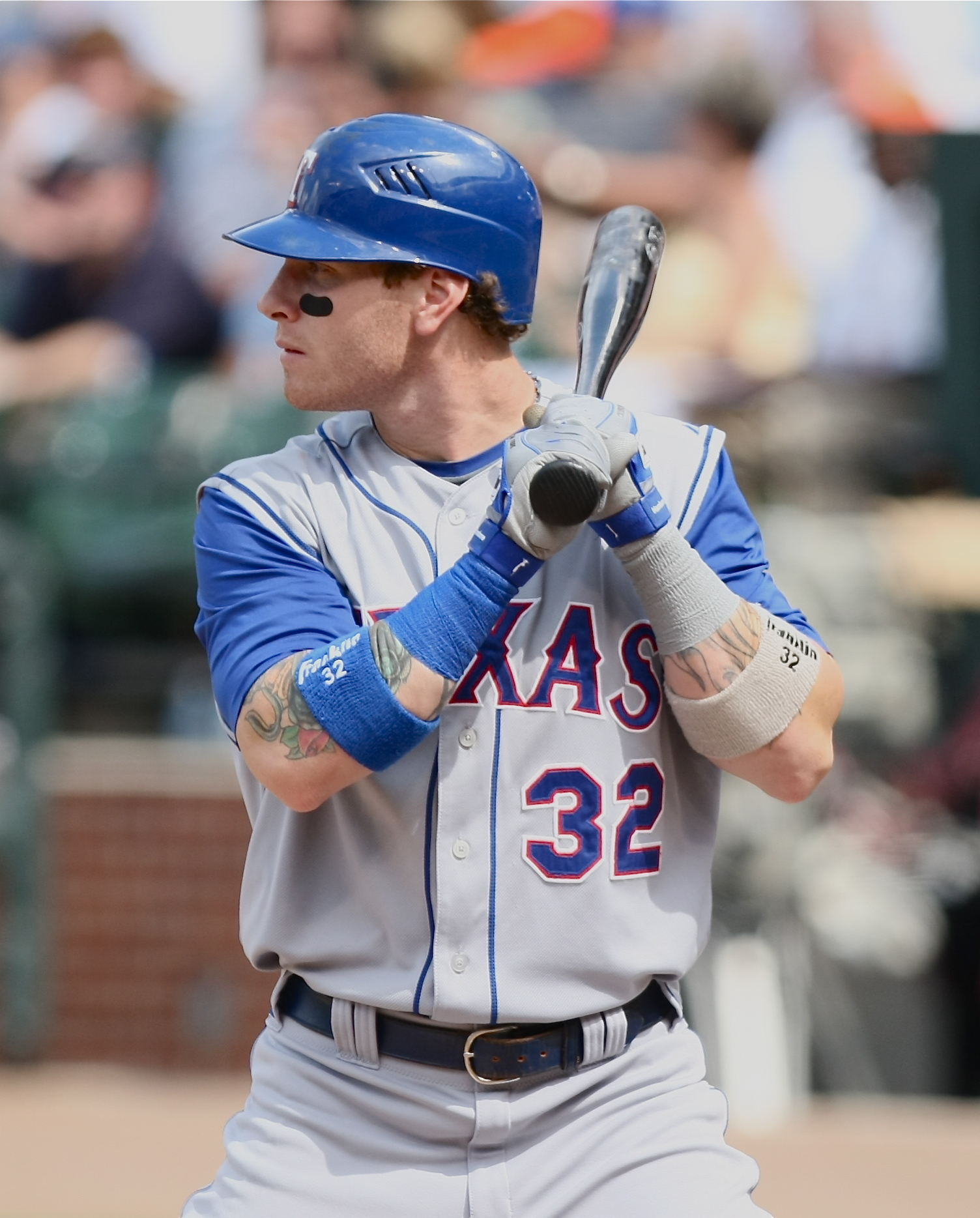
Josh Hamilton, Rangers outfielder from 2008 to 2012

The Rangers began the 2008 season exceptionally well, headlined by newcomer Josh Hamilton who looked to be a threat to win the Triple Crown, before fading off as the season wore on. During the All-Star festivities at Yankee Stadium, Hamilton crushed a first-round home run record in the 2008 Home Run Derby with 28. Hamilton hit another four in the second round and three during the final round, for a total of 35 home runs, but lost to the Twins' Justin Morneau. Four Rangers played in the All Star Game: Hamilton, Ian Kinsler, Milton Bradley, and Michael Young, who would repeat his 2006 All-Star Game feat by driving in the winning run via a sac fly.

The Rangers finished the season with yet another sub-.500 record (79–83), yet ended the season second in the AL West, the club's best finish since 1999. The 2009 season saw the Rangers soar into playoff contention for the first time since 2004. Despite injuries to Josh Hamilton and Ian Kinsler, the Rangers held first place in their division for long stretches of the summer before fading in September, losing the division to the Los Angeles Angels. The Rangers finished the season at 87–75, their first winning season since 2004 and good enough for second place in the AL West. Michael Young responded to his move to third base by posting one of his best offensive seasons ever while committing just nine errors and earning a sixth straight All-Star appearance. Josh Hamilton and Nelson Cruz were also named 2009 AL All-Stars.

==== Rangers Baseball Express, LLC ====
Following financial problems, including defaulting on a $525 million loan, Tom Hicks and Hicks Sports Group reached an agreement to sell the Texas Rangers to group headed by Pittsburgh sports lawyer Chuck Greenberg and Rangers team president Nolan Ryan for about $570 million on January 22, 2010. Hicks also sold much of the land surrounding Rangers Ballpark to Greenberg and Ryan's group in a separate deal.

One of HSG's principal lenders, Monarch Alternative Capital, opposed the sale on grounds that the proceeds would not fully repay the defaulted HSG notes. On April 21, Major League Baseball issued a statement declaring the Rangers' sale to be under the control of the Commissioner to expedite the process. As the stalemate between HSG and its creditors continued, the Rangers filed for Chapter 11 bankruptcy on May 24. As of that date, the Rangers and HSG had an estimated debt of $575 million. Much of the unsecured debt was owed in back salary. Alex Rodriguez topped the list of unsecured creditors, with an estimated $24.9 million owed by the Rangers. The sale would repay all the team's creditors, including Rodriguez and other players owed back salary. After a court-ordered public auction held on August 4 with the winning bid submitted by Greenberg/Ryan, the bankruptcy court closed the case. All 30 MLB owners approved the sale to Greenberg/Ryan at the owners meeting in Minneapolis on August 12. The new ownership group was called Rangers Baseball Express, LLC and had Greenberg as managing general partner and Ryan as club president. Oil magnates Ray Davis and Bob R. Simpson paid the bulk of the $539 million sale price and became co-chairmen, with the largest stakes in the ownership group. They remained mostly in the background as senior consultants, leaving the team mostly in Greenberg's and Ryan's hands.

==== Rise to contention and back-to-back American League Pennants (2010–2016) ====
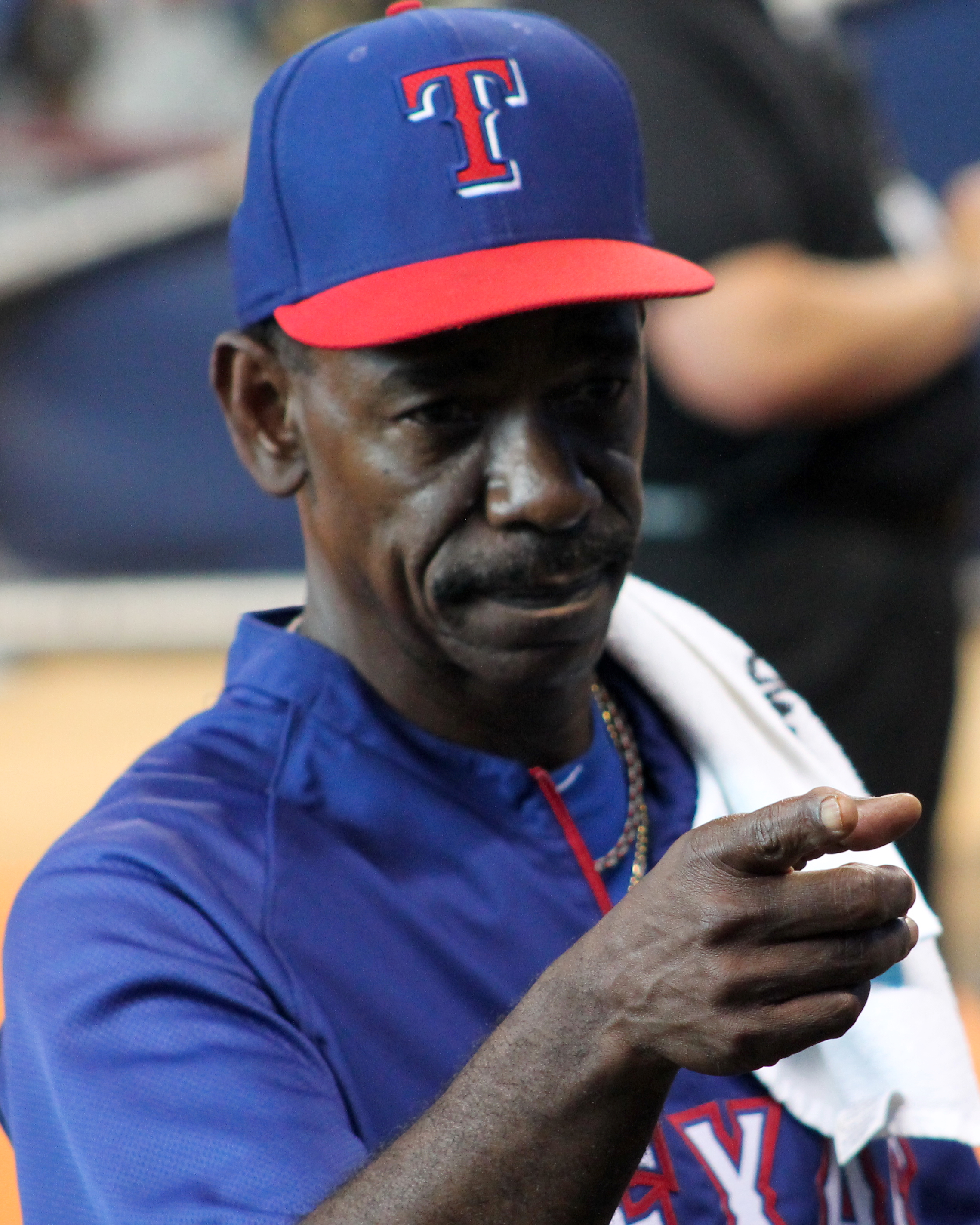
Ron Washington, Rangers manager from 2007 to 2014, winning two A.L. pennants ('10, '11)

With the influx of talent and success in 2009, the Rangers entered the 2010 season expecting to compete for the division and achieve the front office's 2007 goals. During the off-season, Nolan Ryan said of the Rangers' chances in the upcoming season, "My expectations today are that we're going to be extremely competitive, and if we don't win our division, I'll be disappointed."

After stumbling out of the gates with a sub-.500 start in April 2010, the Rangers took the division lead with a franchise-best month of June, going 21–6. The Rangers never relinquished first place after an 11-game winning streak. The team made several mid-season moves to acquire players such as Cliff Lee, Bengie Molina, Jorge Cantú, and Jeff Francoeur. After the All-Star Game, in which six Rangers played, came the debut of the claw and antler hand gestures, which gained popularity especially after the release of various apparel and souvenir options. Foam claws and helmets with deer antlers became commonplace in the ballpark as the Rangers played further into the fall. The Rangers won the AL West on September 25, advancing to the postseason for the first time since 1999, with a 90–72 record. The Rangers entered the playoffs against the Tampa Bay Rays in the first round, which ultimately resulted in a 3–2 series victory and marked the first postseason series victory in the 50-year history of the Rangers/Washington Senators franchise. Facing the Rangers in the American League Championship Series were the defending World Series champion New York Yankees, the team the Rangers failed against three separate times in the 1990s. In a six-game ALCS, Texas came out victorious, winning the first pennant in franchise history in front of an ecstatic home crowd. Josh Hamilton was awarded ALCS MVP. The Rangers faced the San Francisco Giants in the 2010 World Series, but their offense struggled against the Giants' young pitching and eventually lost the Series, 4–1.

In March 2011, Chuck Greenberg resigned as Chief Executive and Managing General Partner and sold his interest in the Rangers after a falling out with his partners. Following his resignation, Nolan Ryan was named CEO in addition to his continuing role as team president. Ryan was subsequently approved as the team's controlling owner by a unanimous vote of the 30 owners of Major League Baseball on May 12.

The Rangers successfully defended their AL West Division title in 2011, making the club's second-straight division title and postseason appearance. The Rangers set records for best win–loss record (96–66, .592) and home attendance (2,946,949). On October 15, they went back to the 2011 World Series after beating the Detroit Tigers 15–5 in game six of the ALCS. The series featured Nelson Cruz hitting six home runs, the most home runs by one player in a playoff series in MLB history. In Game 2, Cruz also became the first player in postseason history to win a game with a walk-off grand slam as the Rangers defeated the Tigers 7–3 in 11 innings. However, they proceeded to lose to the St. Louis Cardinals in seven games, after twice being one strike away from the championship in Game 6.

The Rangers dominated the American League standings for much of the 2012 season, but floundered in September, culminating in a sweep by the Oakland Athletics in the final series. They did, however, qualify for the first American League wild-card playoff game. In the new Wild Card Game, the Rangers' woes continued, as they lost 5–1 to the Orioles. The Rangers figured in the 2013 wild card as well. They finished the season in second place in the American League West with a 91–72 record, tied with the Tampa Bay Rays for a wild card spot. A 163rd play-in tie-breaker game was held to determine the second participant in the 2013 American League Wild Card Game against the Cleveland Indians. The Rangers lost to the Rays, 5–2, in the tie-breaker and were eliminated from playoff contention after reaching the postseason in three consecutive seasons. Nolan Ryan stepped down as Rangers CEO effective October 31, 2013. After that, Daniels served as operating head of the franchise, with Davis and Simpson continuing to serve mostly as senior consultants.

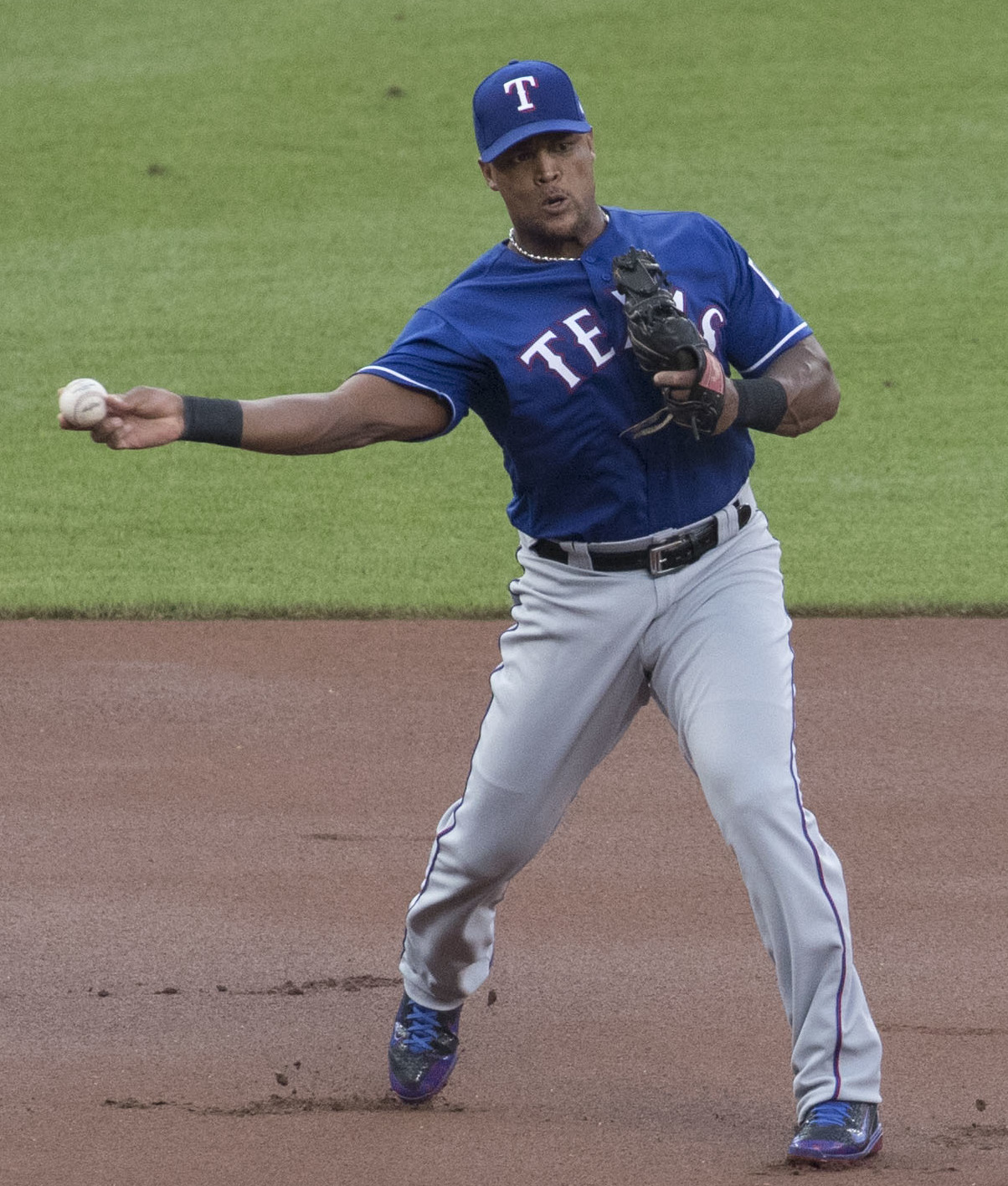
Adrián Beltré, Rangers third baseman from 2011 to 2018

Injuries took a major toll on the Rangers in 2014. The lone bright spot was Adrián Beltré, who despite spending some time injured, was the most consistent offensive player on the team. On September 4, 2014, the Rangers became the first MLB team officially eliminated from 2014 postseason contention when a 10–2 loss at home to the Seattle Mariners dropped their record to 53–87. The next day, manager Ron Washington resigned, citing personal issues. With the acquisition of Cole Hamels in 2015, the Rangers overtook the Houston Astros to clinch the American League West title on the final day of the season with a record of 88–74. The Rangers lost the Division Series to the Toronto Blue Jays in five games after taking a 2–0 series lead. Texas clinched the AL West again in 2016, but lost to Toronto, 3–0, in the ALDS.

==== Rebuilding (2017–2022) ====
The Rangers finished the 2017 campaign 23 games out of first place with a 78–84 record. In 2018, the Rangers partnered with the KBO League's LG Twins, in business and baseball operations. On September 21, 2018, with a 64–88 record, the Rangers fired Jeff Banister, who had led the team since 2015. He was replaced by bench coach Don Wakamatsu for the rest of the season. The Rangers ended the season at 67–95. Chris Woodward was later selected to be the team's manager beginning with the 2019 season. He led the team to a 78–84 record in his first season. The 2019 season also marked the Rangers' final season of play at Globe Life Park. On September 29, 2019, the Rangers played their final game at Globe Life Park, a 6–1 win over the New York Yankees.

Following a delayed start to the 2020 season due to the COVID-19 pandemic, the Rangers played their first regular season game at the new Globe Life Field on July 24, 2020, a 1–0 win over the Colorado Rockies. They ended the contracted season in fifth place at 22–38.

On April 5, 2021, the Texas Rangers hosted the first full-capacity sporting event in the United States since the pandemic began with more than 38,000 fans in attendance. The decision for full capacity stemmed from Texas allowing all businesses to operate at 100% capacity without mask restrictions. The Rangers were criticized by United States health officials and President Joe Biden for hosting a full-capacity event, calling it "a mistake" and "not responsible". However, former White House medical staff member Dr. William Lang argued that lowering rates of COVID-19 infections and increasing rates of vaccination in Texas gave the decision to hold the game at full capacity more credibility. The Rangers did not enforce a mask policy at the home opener or any of their games. Although the seven-day average of COVID-19 cases in Tarrant County more than doubled following the home opener, there was no evidence of causation occurring as a result of the opening game.

After a 60–102 season in 2021, their worst since 1973, the Rangers signed several free agents, including Toronto Blue Jays second baseman Marcus Semien and Los Angeles Dodgers shortstop Corey Seager, and they brought back former starting pitcher Martin Perez after three seasons away from the team. However, the team finished 68–94, good enough for fourth place in the AL West; they were also a franchise- and league-worst 15–35 in one-run games. The Rangers fired Chris Woodward on August 15, 2022, with Tony Beasley taking his place as interim manager for the rest of the year. Two days after Woodward's firing, the Rangers fired President of Baseball Operations (and former Rangers general manager) Jon Daniels, after six consecutive losing seasons. Chris Young, who was named general manager in 2020 to take over the role from Daniels, was named the new club president. On October 21, 2022, the Rangers hired three-time World Series winning manager Bruce Bochy. During the offseason, the Rangers signed longtime New York Mets starting pitcher Jacob deGrom to a five-year, $185 million contract, and starting pitchers Nathan Eovaldi and Andrew Heaney.

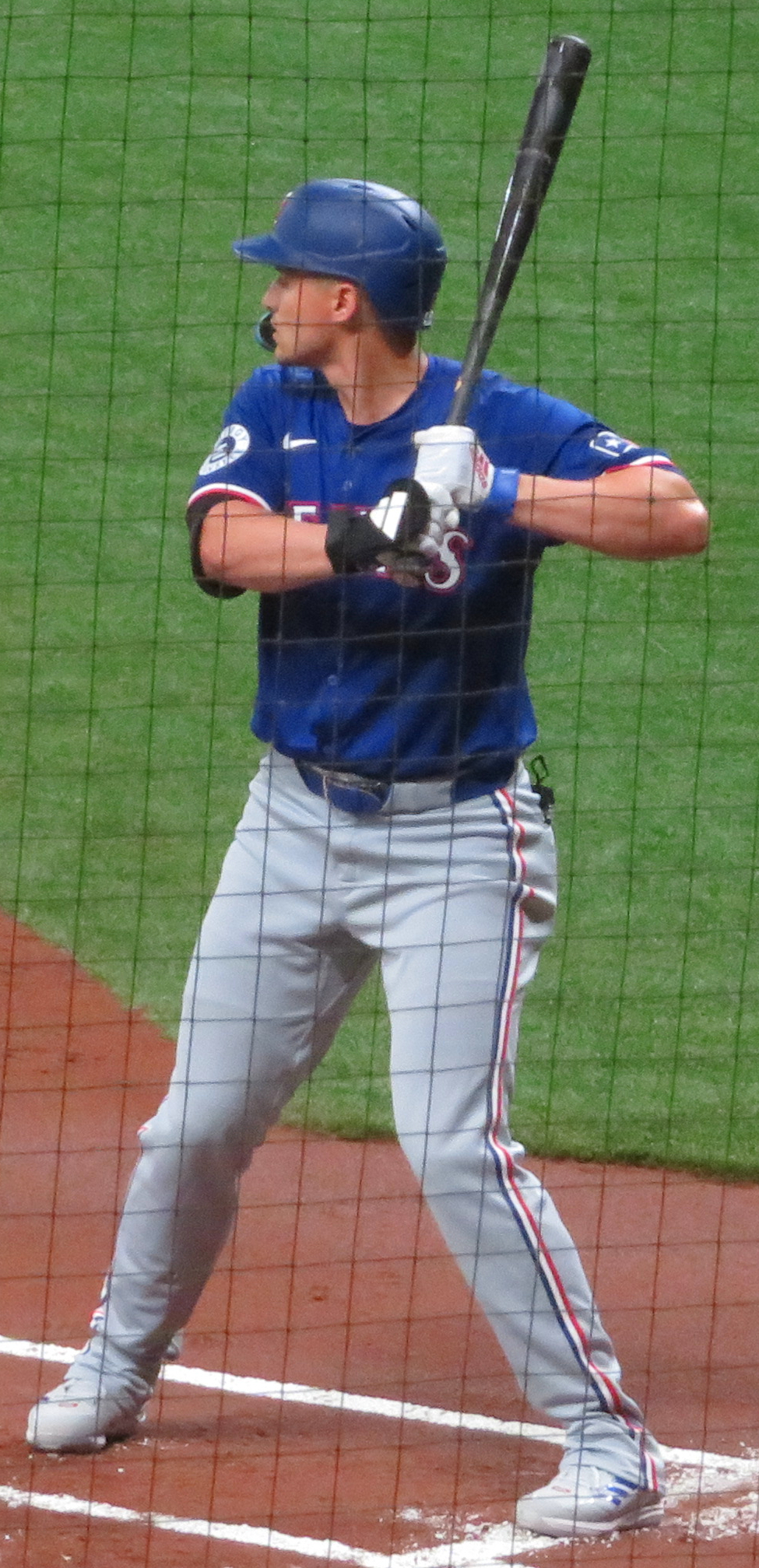
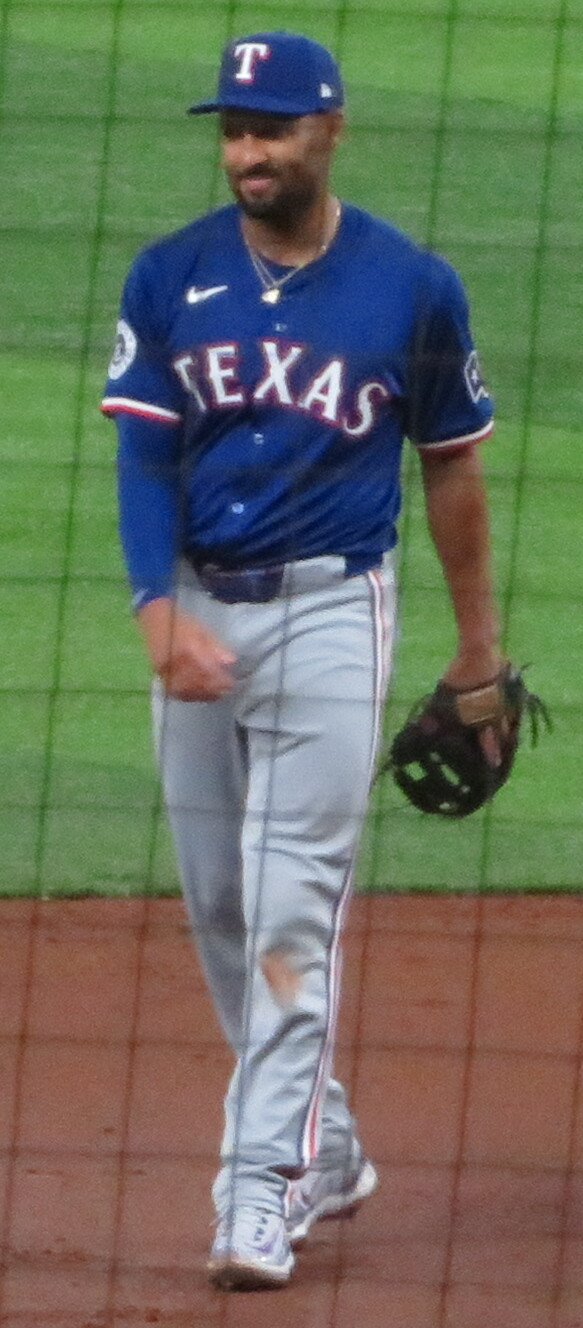
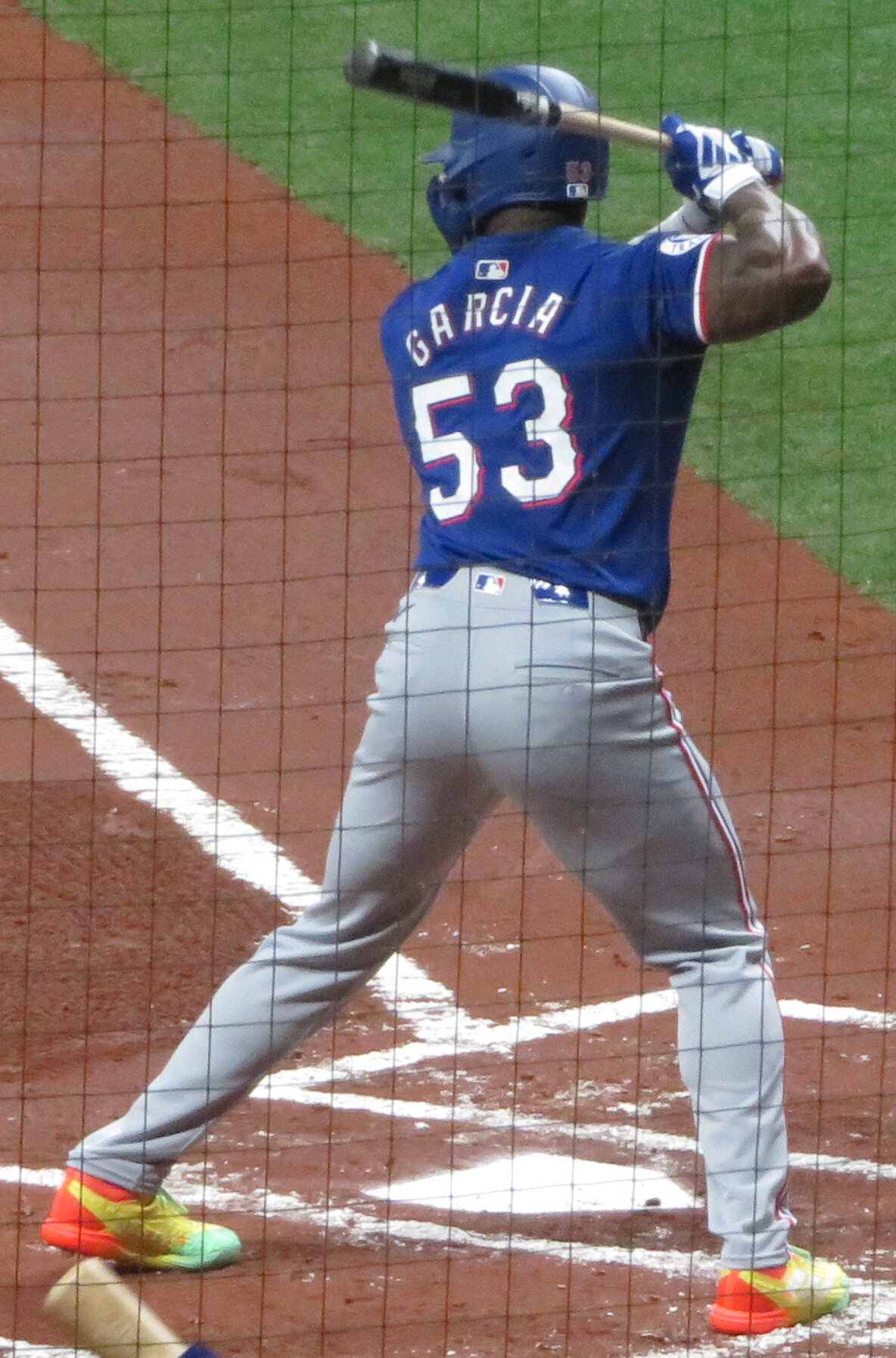
Corey Seager, Marcus Semien, and Adolis García

==== First World Series title (2023–present) ====
The Rangers finished the 2023 season with a 90–72 record, losing the AL West title to the Houston Astros on a tiebreaker. The Rangers had six players (five starters) named to the All-Star game, a franchise record. Second baseman Marcus Semien was the only player who started in every game the Rangers played in 2023, and he also became the fifth player in MLB history with at least 100 RBI in the leadoff spot and won a Silver Slugger award. On September 30, the Rangers clinched a playoff berth for the first time since 2016 with a win against the Seattle Mariners.

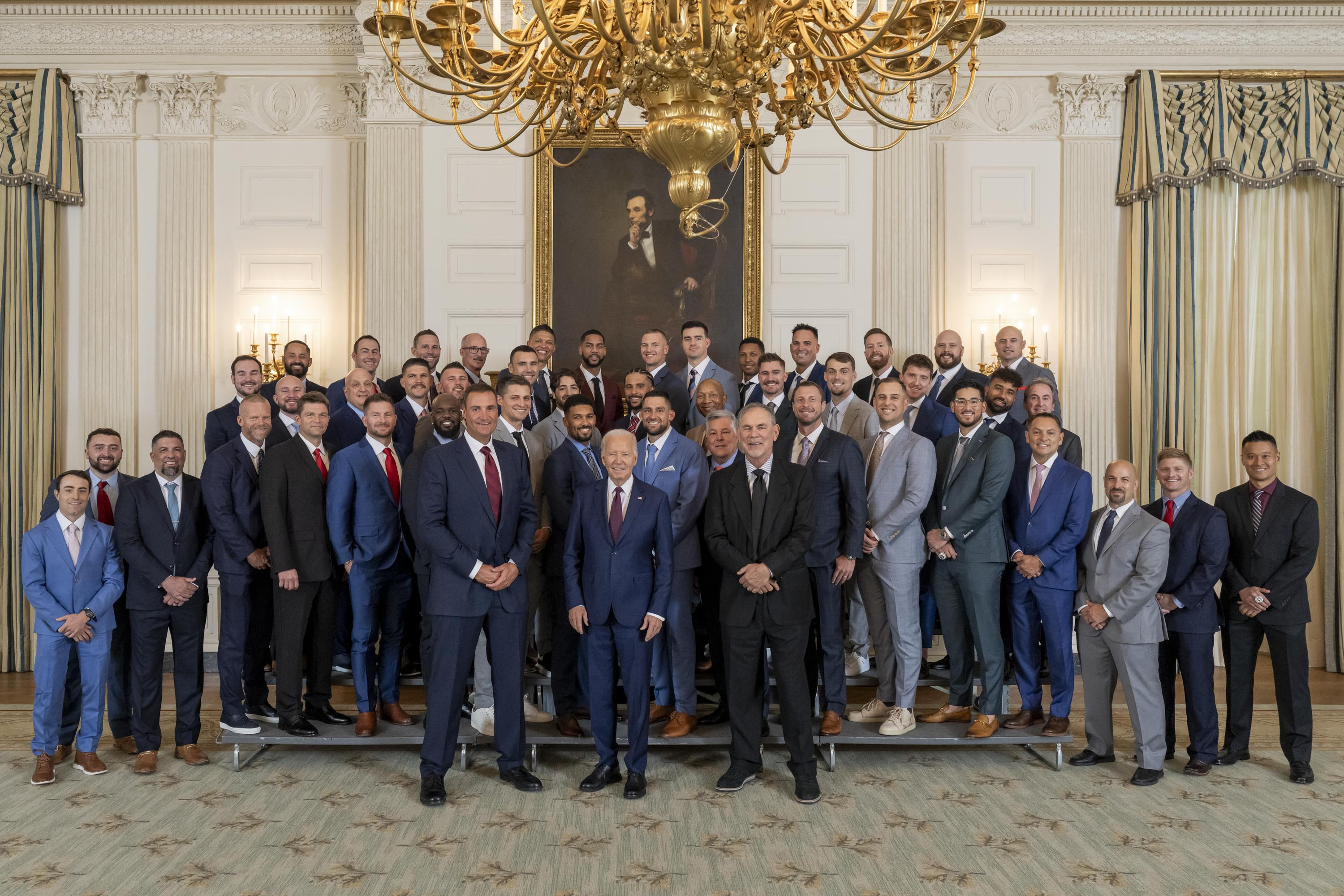
The 2023 World Series champion Texas Rangers at the White House

2023 World Series Champions visit the Biden White House in August 2024

Despite leading the American League West for most of the season and finishing with the same record as the rival and defending champion Houston Astros, they finished second due to the Astros owning the tiebreaker as a result of taking the season series. The Rangers defeated the Tampa Bay Rays in the ALWCS in a two-game sweep and the Baltimore Orioles in a three-game sweep in the ALDS to advance to the ALCS for the first time since 2011, in which they beat their division and Lone Star Series rival, and defending World Series champions Astros in seven games to claim their first pennant since 2011. The Rangers went 13–4 in the postseason, going 2–4 at home and 11–0 on the road, the most road wins in a postseason in MLB history. The postseason was marked by performances by All-Star players Nathan Eovaldi, Corey Seager and Adolis García, with Eovaldi matching the record number of wins by a pitcher in a single postseason with 5, Seager winning World Series MVP and Garcia winning ALCS MVP. On November 1, the Rangers won the 2023 World Series after defeating the Arizona Diamondbacks in five games, achieving their first World Series championship in franchise history.

As a result of many injuries throughout the 2024 season, the Rangers finished the season with a 78–84 record, failing to improve on their 90–72 record from 2023 and not making the playoffs. The Rangers became the first team since the 2019 Washington Nationals (and the 12th team in the past 25 years) to win a World Series title and fail to make the playoffs in the very next year.

== Ballpark ==
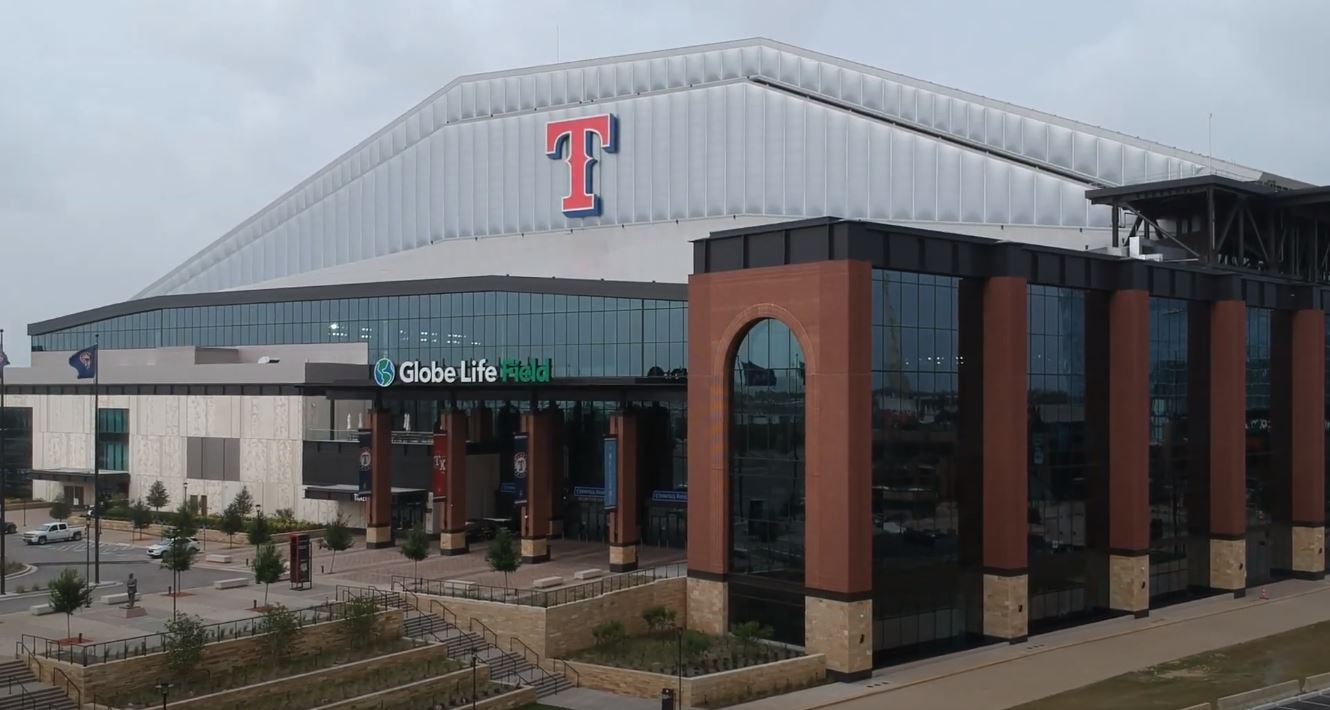
Globe Life Field in June 2020

Globe Life Field, in Arlington, Texas, began serving as the home of the Texas Rangers in 2020. Globe Life and Accident Insurance Company, a subsidiary of McKinney-based Torchmark Corporation, owns the naming rights for the facility through 2048. The new ballpark is located across the street just south of Choctaw Stadium, the Rangers' previous home. Choctaw Stadium was previously named The Ballpark in Arlington, the original name of the facility which opened in 1994. Naming rights were sold to Globe Life and Accident Insurance Company in 2014 who changed the ballpark name to Globe Life Park in Arlington. Choctaw Stadium itself is located just southeast of the site of the Rangers' first home in Texas, Arlington Stadium.

During their tenure in Washington, the Senators played all but one season at RFK Stadium, following their inaugural season spent in old Griffith Stadium.

== Uniforms ==
=== 1972–1982 ===
The Rangers debuted in the Dallas-Fort Worth Metroplex wearing double-knit polyester buttoned uniforms. Both the home white and road gray uniforms feature "RangerS" in red serif rounded letters with blue drop shadows (with a white star at the bottom of the "R"), and the back of the uniform featured red block letters for the player names and red block numbers with blue trim. Red, white and blue stripes adorn the collar and sleeves. The original cap is blue with a red brim, and has a white "T" trimmed in red emblazoned on it.

In 1975, the Rangers went with a two-button pullover design and changed the road uniform color to powder blue. The home design remained mostly the same save for the blue trim on the player's name. However, the front of the road uniform was changed to "TEXAS" in red letters with white and blue trim, which was also used on the numbers. Player names became dark royal blue. This style was used for one season before the blue trim disappeared and the middle three letters became lowercase in the word "TexaS". Also in 1976, a left sleeve patch was added containing the Texas map and red star on a red, white and blue shield with "RANGERS" in red letters on top. For 1976 only, the patch featured "1776" and "1976" in white in commemoration of the United States Bicentennial. Names would be dropped from the uniform in 1980, but returned the following season, during which the uniforms returned to a traditional buttoned style and a new circular sleeve patch featuring the "TR" in red letters in front of a baseball and blue Texas map was added.

=== 1983–1993 ===
This period saw the Rangers deemphasize red in favor of blue on their uniforms. The home white uniform now had "RANGERS" in uppercase letters, with the trim on the player names removed. The road uniform color was changed to a dark royal blue, and "TEXAS" was also featured in red-trimmed white uppercase letters. The "TR" patch minus the circle was moved to the left chest, and a road all-blue cap was unveiled featuring a red "T" trimmed in white. This design was used for one season. Then in 1984, the Rangers made slight tweaks to their uniforms, unveiling a red alternate uniform and going with a script "Rangers" in front. The sleeve patch, now featuring the script "Rangers" in red on a baseball and a blue Texas map, was added, and left chest numbers were also emblazoned.

Late in 1985, the Rangers returned to wearing road gray uniforms. This design has "TEXAS" in blue block letters with white trim; the same color scheme was also used on the player's name and number. Both this uniform and the existing home uniform removed the collar and sleeve striping. In addition, the all-blue cap returned after a two-year absence, replacing the original red-brimmed blue cap. Both blue and red alternate uniforms were retired.

=== 1994–2000 ===
The Rangers changed its uniforms in anticipation of moving to The Ballpark in Arlington. Red became the primary color and blue was relegated to accent color, and silver was also added. The home white uniforms featured red piping and "RANGERS" in red serif rounded letters with blue trim. That same color scheme was used on the player's name and number. The road gray uniforms featured red sleeve piping and "TEXAS" in red serif rounded letters with white trim; the player's name and number also adopted this color scheme. A new red cap was also unveiled, featuring a white "T" with a blue drop-shadow. Blue trim was later added on the road uniform letters. Starting in 1996, the Rangers sported a new sleeve patch. This patch is a blue diamond with silver pinstripes, and contained a silver star surrounded by a red circle that featured two baseballs and the full team name in white letters.

For the 2000 season, the Rangers kept their home uniforms, but the road uniforms were changed anew. Blue again became the dominant color on the road uniform letters, and a new all-blue cap was released, essentially the inverse of the all-red cap. A new blue alternate uniform was also released, featuring white letters with red and blue trim. A Texas flag patch adorned the home and road uniforms.

=== 2001–2008 ===
Starting in 2001, the Rangers again went with blue as a dominant color, while also adding black as an accent color. Black drop shadows were added on the home and road uniform letters, as were silver accents on the blue alternate uniform. The home uniform brought back the left chest numbers but removed the chest piping, while the Texas flag patch was added on the blue alternate uniform. The Rangers wore three different caps during this period. For both home and road games, the Rangers sported either an all-blue cap or a black-brimmed blue cap with the "T" in white and red drop shadows, while for road games only, the all-blue cap with a red "T" on a white drop shadow was used.

In 2004, the Rangers added a white alternate sleeveless uniform, containing the red "T" with white trim and blue drop shadows in front, along with blue piping and blue letters with red trim. The chest number was moved to the right. In 2006, the Rangers added a gray road alternate sleeveless uniform, similar to their primary road uniform but with the addition of chest numbers and blue piping, and the absence of black drop shadows. Both sleeveless uniforms were paired with blue undershirts. The red "T" all-blue cap which was not worn in 2004 and 2005 was brought back to be worn with the road gray alternates. However, the black-brimmed blue cap was retired permanently.

=== 2009–2019 ===
In 2009, the Rangers unveiled slight updates to their uniform design. The home uniform now featured "TEXAS" in blue letters with red and white trim along with black drop shadows. The chest numbers were also removed. In addition, the block letters and numbers added some pointed accents similar to the "TEXAS" wordmark. The Rangers also added a red home alternate uniform, which was essentially the inverse of their blue alternate uniform. This uniform also brought back the all-red cap which was last worn in 2000. Starting in 2014, the black drop shadows and silver accents were removed. While blue remained a primary color used on all road games and most home games, the Rangers would occasionally wear red accessories with the home white uniform.

=== 2020–present ===
As in 1994, the Rangers changed their uniforms upon moving to a new ballpark, this time in Globe Life Field. The home white uniforms now featured a script "Rangers" wordmark in blue with white and red trim, and letters were blue with white trim and red drop shadows. As with the previous white uniform, this set is worn with either blue or red accessories. The road gray, red alternate, and blue alternate uniform remained mostly the same except for the updated letters and the addition of drop shadows. On the red alternate uniform, a blue-brimmed red cap with "TX" in front of a red Texas map in front was added as an alternate to the all-red cap. Also new was a powder blue alternate, featuring the "Rangers" script in white with royal blue trim and red drop shadows, and is paired with a powder blue cap with royal blue brim emblazoned with a white "T" on a red drop shadow. Unlike the other uniforms, the powder blue alternate does not have a corresponding batting helmet; instead, the royal blue batting helmet was used.

In 2023, due to MLB and Nike's new four-uniform plus City Connect limit, the Rangers' red uniform was retired. However, the red equipment worn with the uniform were retained for select home games. The red "TX" cap, last worn on a regular basis in 2021, was also officially retired. Also that year, the Rangers unveiled their City Connect uniform. The cream and midnight blue uniform featured a mythical-like creature titled a Peagle, which represents the metro area's two minor league baseball teams before the arrival of the team, the Fort Worth Panthers and the Dallas Eagles. Along with the Peagle, the uniform also features a typographic "TX" on the hat and across the chest, as this is similar to the uniform of the Eagles. The City Connect uniform was met with mixed reception, with most criticism stemming from fans who disliked the uniform's design.

The Rangers' second City Connect uniform, unveiled in 2026, featured a red base with lettering derived from their 1985–1993 road uniforms. The shade of red used is derived from the dye produced by the crushed-up cochineal insect. The chest featured the Spanish spelling "TEJAS" in red block letters with white trim. All-red caps featuring the 1970s "T" logo were paired with this uniform. The sleeve and pant piping featured a charro-inspired pattern while a sleeve patch contained a Texas outline inside a papel picado.

== Mascot ==
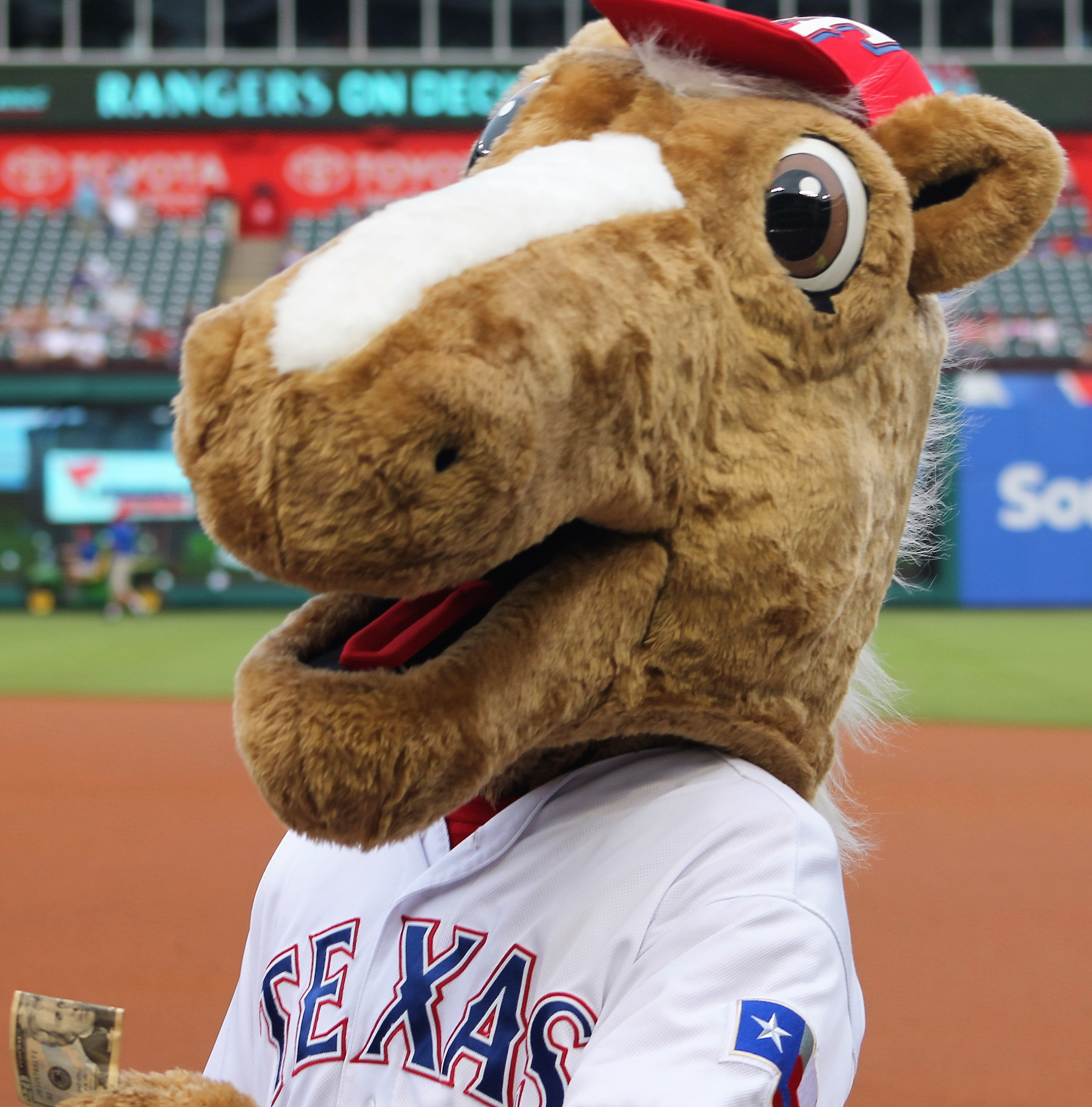
Rangers Captain (May 2016)

Rangers Captain is the mascot for the Texas Rangers. Introduced in 2002, he is a palomino-style horse, dressed in the team's uniform. He wears the uniform number 72 in honor of 1972, the year the Rangers relocated to Arlington. He has multiple uniforms to match each of the variants the team wears. Captain's outfits sometimes match a theme the team is promoting; on April 24, 2010, he was dressed up like Elvis Presley as part of an Elvis-themed night.

== Achievements ==
=== Baseball Hall of Famers ===
Texas Rangers Hall of Famers
Affiliation according to the National Baseball Hall of Fame and Museum
Washington Senators

Nellie Fox

Gil Hodges

Minnie Miñoso

Ted Williams

Texas Rangers

Harold Baines
Carlos Beltrán

**Adrián Beltré** *
Bert Blyleven
Goose Gossage

Vladimir Guerrero
Whitey Herzog

Ferguson Jenkins
Andruw Jones
Gaylord Perry

**Iván Rodríguez** *
**Nolan Ryan**

- Players and managers listed in **bold** are depicted on their Hall of Fame plaques wearing a Rangers or Senators cap insignia.
- * Texas Rangers listed as primary team according to the Hall of Fame

Chuck Hinton and Frank Howard, who played for the franchise in Washington (although Howard played for the Rangers in 1972), are listed on the Washington Hall of Stars display at Nationals Park in Washington. So are Gil Hodges and Mickey Vernon, who managed the "New Senators". Vernon also played for the "Old Senators", who became the Minnesota Twins.

=== Ford C. Frick Award recipients ===
Texas Rangers Ford C. Frick Award recipients
Affiliation according to the National Baseball Hall of Fame and Museum

Jon Miller

**Eric Nadel**

- **Names in bold** received the award based primarily on their work as broadcasters for the Rangers or Senators.

=== Texas Sports Hall of Fame ===
**Rangers in the Texas Sports Hall of Fame**
| No. | Name | Position | Tenure | Notes |
| — | Lee Ballanfant | Scout | 1972–1981 | Born in Waco |
| 2, 10 | Michael Young | IF | 2000–2012 | |
| 7 | Iván Rodríguez | C | 1991–2002, 2009 | |
| 10 | Jim Sundberg | C | 1974–1983; 1988–1989 | |
| 27 | Lance Berkman | 1B | 2013 | Elected mainly on his performance with Houston Astros, born and raised in Waco, attended Rice University |
| 29 | Adrián Beltré | 3B | 2011–2018 | |
| 34 | Nolan Ryan | P | 1989–1993 | Born in Refugio, grew up in Alvin |
| 46 | Burt Hooton | P | 1985 | Elected mainly on his performances with Chicago Cubs and Los Angeles Dodgers, born in Greenville, attended University of Texas-Austin |

=== Texas Rangers Hall of Fame ===
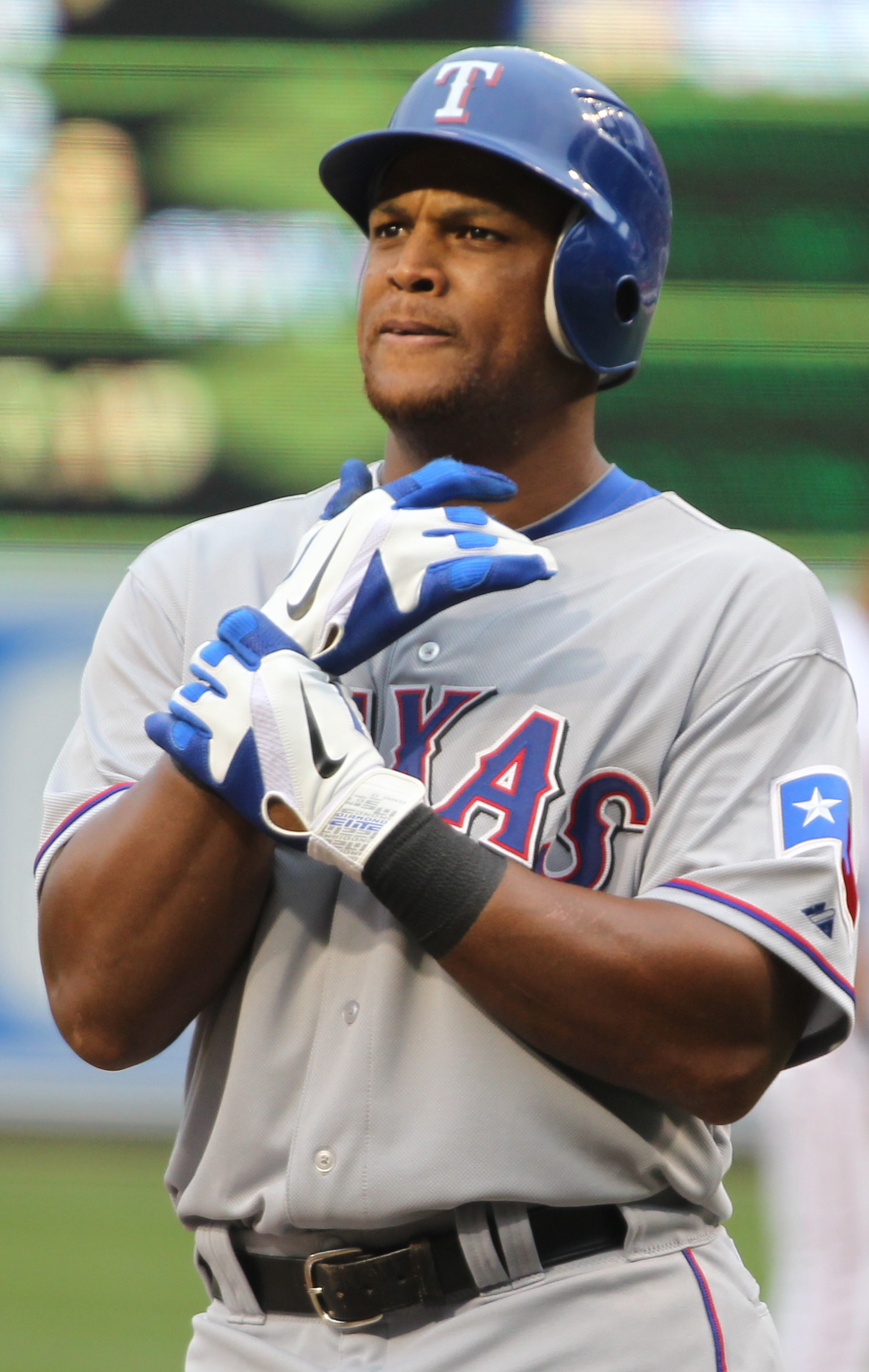
Adrián Beltré

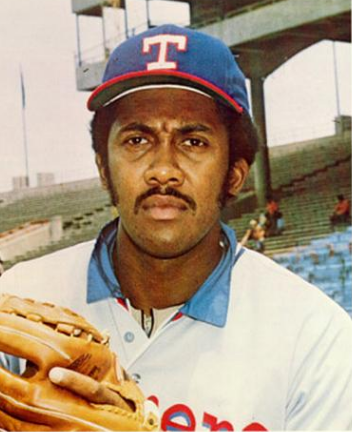
Ferguson Jenkins

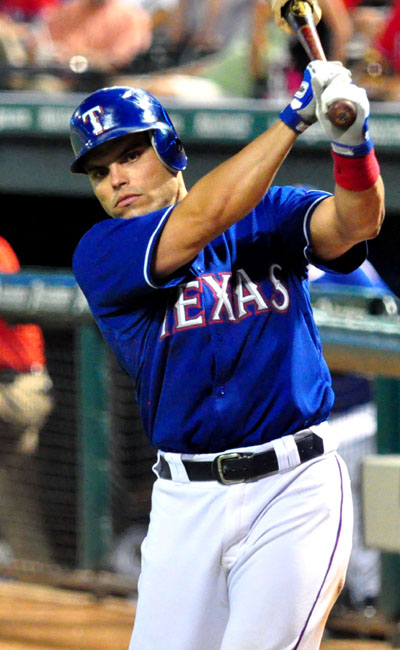
Iván Rodríguez

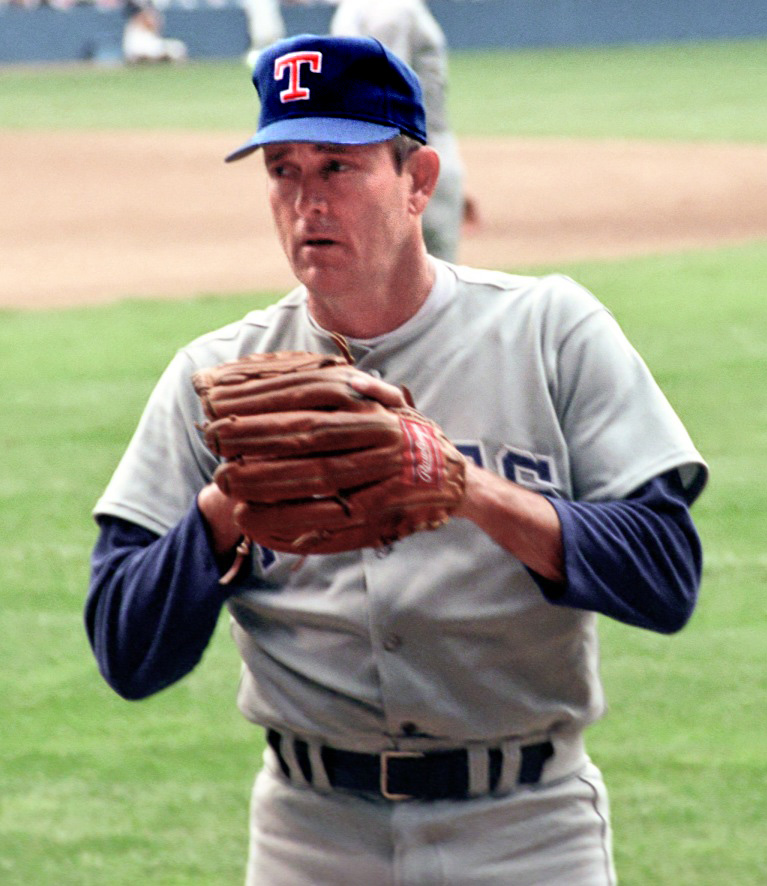
Nolan Ryan

The Texas Rangers Hall of Fame was created in 2003 to honor the careers of former Texas Rangers players, managers, executives, and broadcasters. There are currently 27 members. The Hall is located in Globe Life Park in Arlington, behind right field. The Hall's two levels cover 13,000 square feet (1,200 m^{2}) and included a 235-seat theater and various plaques, photos, and memorabilia. It can accommodate up to 600 people.

Key
| Year | Year inducted |
| **Bold** | Member of the Baseball Hall of Fame |
| † | Member of the Baseball Hall of Fame as a Ranger |
| **Bold** | Recipient of the Hall of Fame's Ford C. Frick Award |

**Texas Rangers Hall of Fame**
| Year | No. | Name | Position(s) | Tenure |
| 2003 | 49 | Charlie Hough | P | 1980–1990 |
| 2003 | 26 | Johnny Oates | Manager | 1995–2001 |
| 2003 | 34 | **Nolan Ryan**^{†} | P | 1989–1993 |
| 2003 | 10 | Jim Sundberg | C | 1974–1983; 1988–1989 |
| 2004 | 25 | Buddy Bell | 3B | 1979–1985, 1989 |
| 2004 | 31 | **Fergie Jenkins** | P | 1974–1975; 1978–1981 |
| 2004 | — | Tom Vandergriff | Broadcaster | 1975–1977 |
| 2005 | — | Mark Holtz | Broadcaster | 1981–1997 |
| 2005 | 35 | John Wetteland | P | 1997–2000 |
| 2007 | 29 | Rusty Greer | LF | 1994–2002 |
| 2009 | 11, 17 | Toby Harrah | 3B/SS; Manager | 1969, 1971–1978; 1985–1986; 1992 |
| 2009 | 3, 21, 24, 28, 38 | Rubén Sierra | RF/DH | 1986–1992; 2000–2001; 2003 |
| 2010 | 4, 6 | Tom Grieve | OF | 1970, 1972–1977 |
| 2011 | 37 | Kenny Rogers | P | 1989–1995; 2000–2002; 2004–2005 |
| 2012 | — | **Eric Nadel** | Broadcaster | 1979–present |
| 2013 | 7 | **Iván Rodríguez**^{†} | C | 1991–2002, 2009 |
| 2014 | — | Tom Schieffer | Team President | 1991–1999 |
| 2015 | 13, 19 | Juan González | OF | 1989–1999; 2002–2003 |
| 2015 | 40 | Jeff Russell | P | 1985–1992; 1995–1996 |
| 2016 | 2, 10 | Michael Young | IF | 2000–2012 |
| 2019 | 32 | Josh Hamilton | OF | 2008–2012, 2015 |
| 2019 | — | Richard Greene | Mayor of Arlington | 1987–1997 |
| 2021 | 29 | **Adrián Beltré**^{†} | 3B | 2011–2018 |
| 2021 | — | Chuck Morgan | Public Address Announcer | 1983–2001; 2003–present |
| 2022 | 5 | Ian Kinsler | 2B | 2006–2013 |
| 2022 | — | John Blake | Executive | 1984–2004; 2008–present |
| 2025 | 1 | Elvis Andrus | SS | 2009–2020 |

=== Retired numbers ===
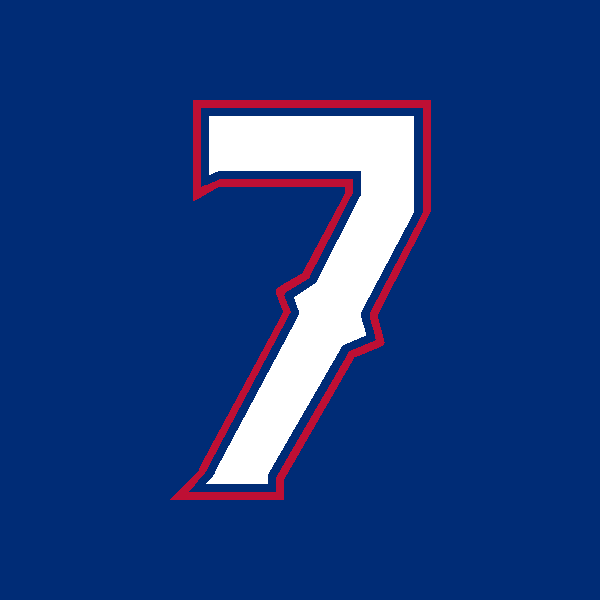
Iván
Rodríguez
C

Retired August 12, 2017
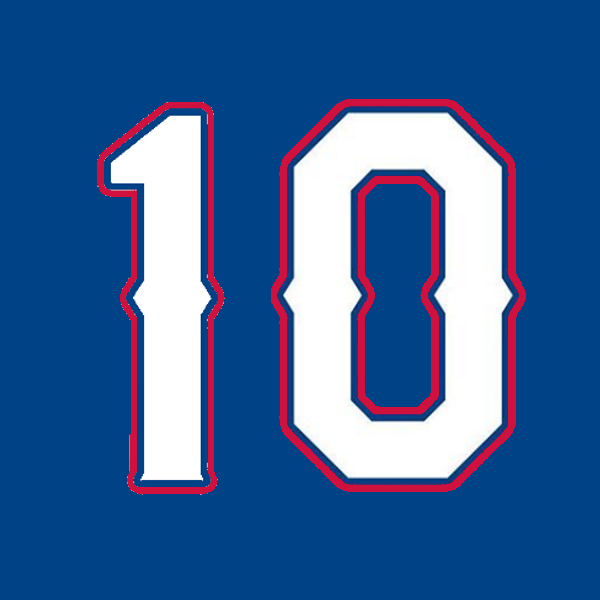
Michael
Young
IF

Retired August 31, 2019
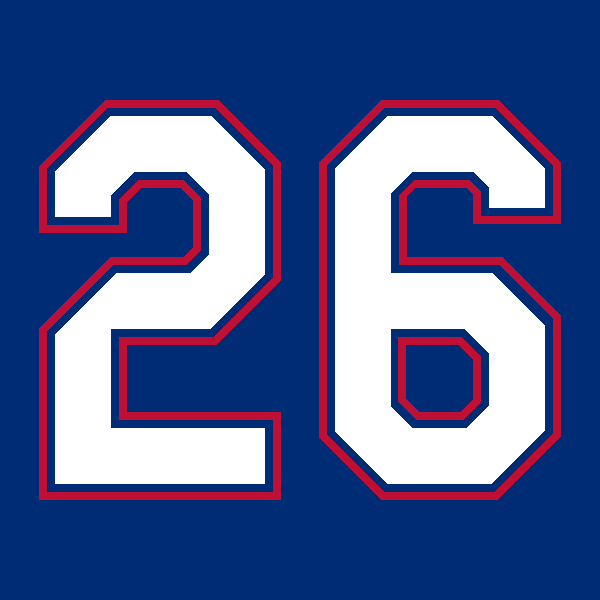
Johnny
Oates
Mgr

Retired August 6, 2005
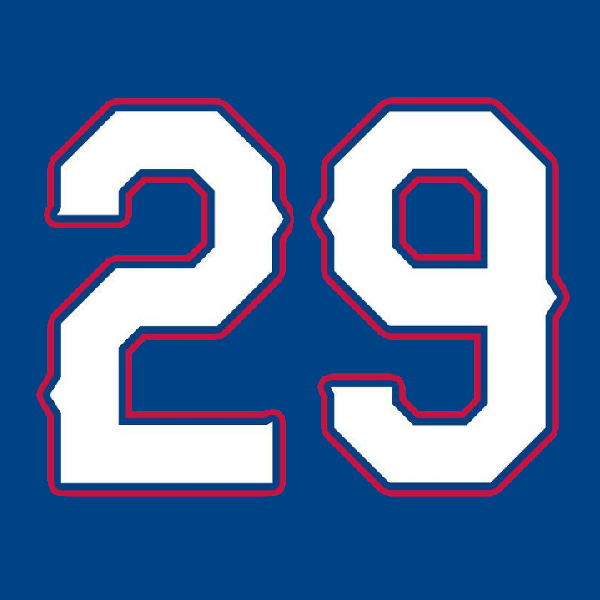
Adrián
Beltré
3B

Retired June 8, 2019
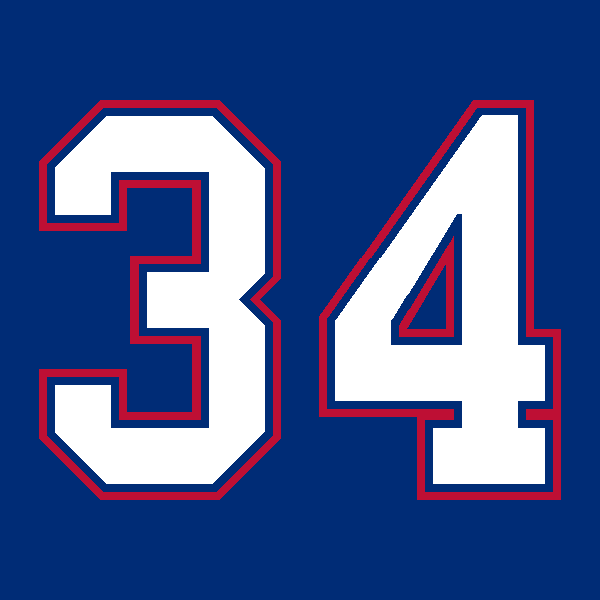
Nolan
Ryan
P

Retired September 15, 1996
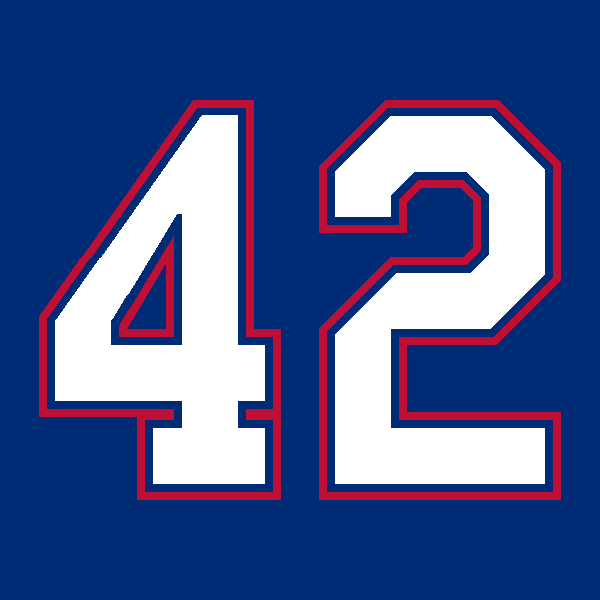
Jackie
Robinson
All MLB

Honored April 15, 1997

All of the Rangers' retired numbers are directly incorporated into the posted dimensions of Globe Life Field. The left-field foul line distance is 329 feet (Beltré), the deepest point of the ballpark is 410 feet (Young), straightaway center field is 407 feet (Rodríguez), the right-field foul line is 326 feet (Oates), and the backstop distance, measured from the rear point of home plate via a line running through second base, is 42 feet (Robinson). A sign just inside the left-field foul line is marked as 334 feet to honor Ryan. The power alleys, at 372 feet in left and 374 feet in right, respectively pay homage to the Rangers' first season in Arlington (1972) and first winning season (1974).

=== Team captains ===
- Buddy Bell 1985
- Michael Young 2005–2012
- Adrián Beltré 2013–2018

== Roster ==
Texas Rangers 2027 spring training roster
| 40-man roster | | Non-roster invitees | Coaches / other |
|---|---|---|---|
| Pitchers: 54 Robby Ahlstrom; 61 Cody Bradford; 65 Gavin Collyer; 59 José Corniell; -- Aidan Curry; 72 David Davalillo; 48 Jacob deGrom; 17 Nathan Eovaldi; 62 Robert Garcia; 1 MacKenzie Gore; 75 Peyton Gray; 67 Jacob Latz; 22 Jack Leiter; 74 Leandro López; 71 Adam Macko; 58 Michel Otañez; 70 Ben Peoples; 80 Kumar Rocker; 47 Winston Santos; 63 Chase Silseth; 56 Emiliano Teodo; -- Josh White; 60 Cole Winn | Catchers: 9 Danny Jansen; Infielders: 21 Jake Burger; 20 Ezequiel Durán; 14 Justin Foscue; 39 Cody Freeman; 6 Josh Jung; 5 Corey Seager; Outfielders: 32 Evan Carter; 27 Cameron Cauley; 36 Wyatt Langford; 24 Brandon Nimmo; 19 Alejandro Osuna; Designated hitters: 4 Logan O'Hoppe | Pitchers: -- Dylan File | Manager: 55 Skip Schumaker; Coaches: 88 Rod Barajas (quality control); 82 Eric Dorton (assistant hitting); 87 Brett Hayes (catching); 96 Travis Jankowski (first base); -- Tommy Joseph (hitting); 64 Corey Ragsdale (third base); 84 Colby Suggs (bullpen); 83 Jordan Tiegs (pitching); 81 Luis Urueta (bench); 89 Justin Viele (lead hitting); 36 active, 0 inactive, 1 non-roster invitees; 7-, 10-, or 15-day injured list; * Not on active roster; ^{†} Suspended list; Roster, coaches, and NRIs updated November 20, 2026; Transactions • Depth chart; → All MLB rosters |

== Season-by-season records ==
Texas Rangers 10-Year History
| Season | Wins | Losses | Win % | Place | Playoffs |
|---|---|---|---|---|---|
| 2017 | 78 | 84 | .481 | 4th in AL West | — |
| 2018 | 67 | 95 | .414 | 5th in AL West | — |
| 2019 | 78 | 84 | .481 | 3rd in AL West | — |
| 2020 | 22 | 38 | .367 | 5th in AL West | — |
| 2021 | 60 | 102 | .370 | 5th in AL West | — |
| 2022 | 68 | 94 | .420 | 4th in AL West | — |
| 2023 | 90 | 72 | .556 | 2nd in AL West | Won ALWCS vs. Tampa Bay Rays, 2–0; Won ALDS vs. Baltimore Orioles, 3–0; Won ALCS vs. Houston Astros, 4–3; Won World Series vs. Arizona Diamondbacks, 4–1 |
| 2024 | 78 | 84 | .481 | 3rd in AL West | — |
| 2025 | 81 | 81 | .500 | 3rd in AL West | — |
| 2026 | 80 | 82 | .494 | 2nd in AL West | — |
| 10-Year Record | 702 | 816 | .462 | — | — |
| All-Time Record | 4,979 | 5,465 | .477 | — | — |

== Team records ==
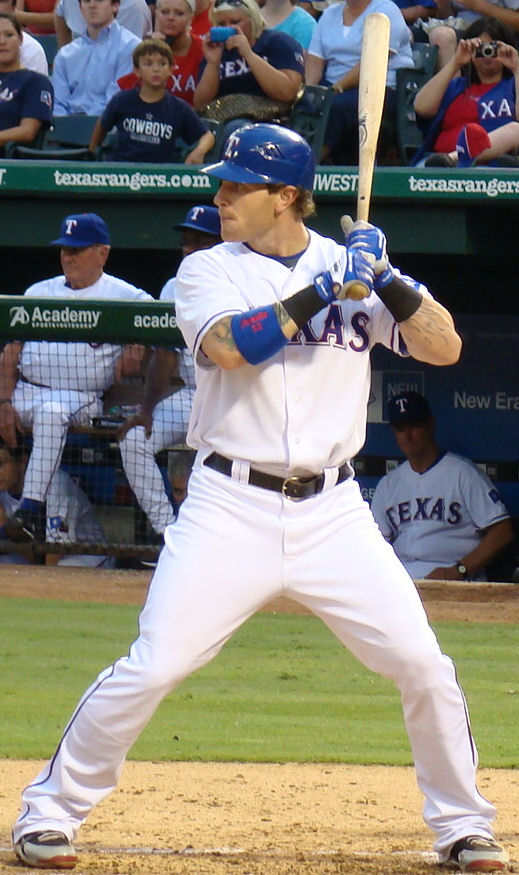
Josh Hamilton set the single-season batting average record (.359) in 2010.

These are partial records of players with the best performance in distinct statistical categories during a single season.

Batting

- Games played: 163, Al Oliver (1980)
- Runs: 133, Alex Rodriguez (2001)
- Hits: 221, Michael Young (2005)
- Doubles: 52, Michael Young (2006)
- Triples: 14, Rubén Sierra (1989)
- Home runs: 57, Alex Rodriguez (2002)
- Runs batted in: 157, Juan González (1998)
- Stolen bases: 52, Bump Wills (1978)
- Batting average: .359, Josh Hamilton (2010)
- Slugging percentage: .643, Juan González (1996)

Pitching

- Wins: 25, Ferguson Jenkins (1974)
- Saves: 49, Francisco Cordero (2004)
- Complete games: 29, Ferguson Jenkins (1974)
- Strikeouts: 301, Nolan Ryan (1989)

== Radio and television ==
=== Radio ===
- KRLD-FM 105.3 FM
- KRLD (AM) NewsRadio 1080 will carry any games that conflict with previously scheduled programming on 105.3 The FAN.
- KFLC 1270 AM (Spanish)

In addition to the flagship stations listed above, Rangers games can be heard on affiliates throughout much of Texas, and also in parts of Oklahoma, Arkansas, Louisiana, New Mexico, and Kansas. Eric Nadel is the primary play-by-play announcer. He has called games for the club since 1979 beginning on television broadcasts, then moving exclusively to radio beginning in 1985. He became the primary announcer after the late Mark Holtz moved to television. Currently, Nadel provides play-by-play in the 1st, 4th, 5th, 8th, and 9th innings, and color commentary for the other innings. On December 11, 2013, he was awarded the 2014 Ford C. Frick Award by the National Baseball Hall of Fame and Museum for excellence in broadcasting. Matt Hicks shares the broadcast booth with Nadel. He joined the broadcast in 2012 after Steve Busby moved from radio to television to replace Dave Barnett. Hicks provides play-by-play in the 2nd, 3rd, 6th, and 7th innings, and color commentary for the other innings. Jared Sandler hosts the pre-game and post-game shows, and also fills in whenever Nadel or Hicks have a day off. Ted Emrich fills in for Sandler when the latter calls games on television. For the Spanish radio affiliates, Eleno Ornelas is the play-by-play announcer, and former Rangers pitcher José Guzmán is the color analyst.

=== Television ===
Since the late 1980s when it started as Home Sports Entertainment, Texas Rangers games were a mainstay of the regional sports network Bally Sports Southwest, and during the network's period under the ownership of Fox Corporation as Fox Sports Net Southwest, a package of games also aired over-the-air on then-sister broadcast station KDFI (channel 27). During the 2016 season, they had an average 3.96 rating and 105,000 viewers on primetime broadcasts. In the team's outdoor era at Arlington Stadium and Globe Life Park, the team played Sunday home games at night through most of the summer and the team frequently appeared on ESPN's Sunday Night Baseball as a consequence.

On March 14, 2023, Diamond Sports Group, then-owner of Bally Sports Southwest (BSSW), filed for Chapter 11 bankruptcy protection. Diamond missed a payment to the Rangers. On April 5, 2023, the Rangers filed an emergency motion asking the bankruptcy judge to order Diamond to pay the Rangers fully or give its media rights back to the MLB. A hearing on the matter was set for May 31, 2023. As an interim, on April 19, the bankruptcy judge ordered Diamond Sports to pay 50% of what the Rangers were owed. On June 1, 2023, after a two day long hearing, the bankruptcy judge ordered Diamond to pay the Rangers fully within five days.

As the Rangers' 2024 season came to an end, the team regained their broadcast rights from BSSW and began pursuing a new broadcast deal for the 2025 season. On January 15, 2025, the Rangers announced they had signed a multi-year deal with Victory+ to broadcast their games via streaming beginning with the 2025 season. Later that month, the team would announce the creation of the Rangers Sports Network (RSN), which carries games on traditional cable and satellite providers including AT&T, Spectrum, and DirecTV, in addition to 15 games to be aired over the air across the Rangers' local broadcast territory, including KDAF (channel 33) in the Metroplex.

On July 15, 2026, the Rangers abruptly announced that the streaming component of RSN would move to BZZR, a startup backed by one of the franchise's minority owners, effective immediately. The move came amid concerns about the financial stability of Victory+. Victory+ subscribers were able to move their subscriptions to the new service.

Since 2017, Dave Raymond is the primary television play-by-play announcer, and analyst duties (as of 2026) are split between former Rangers players Mike Bacsik and David Murphy. In-game reporting is provided by Laura Stickells. Jared Sandler fills in for Raymond for select games.

Since 2025, the RSN pre- and postgame show, Rangers Gameday, is simulcast on both television and radio. Sandler serves as the primary host, and is joined for select games by Rangers Hall of Famer Elvis Andrus or former Rangers outfielder Brad Miller. When Sandler has television play-by-play duties, Ted Emrich fills in as host.

== Rivalries ==
=== Lone Star Series: Houston Astros ===
The Silver Boot is awarded annually to the winner of the Lone Star Series

The Lone Star Series (also known as the Silver Boot Series) is a Major League Baseball rivalry featuring Texas' two major league franchises, the Rangers and Houston Astros. It is an outgrowth of the "natural rivalry" established by MLB as part of interleague play as the Rangers are a member of the American League and the Astros were a member of the National League until 2012.

During interleague play, the winner of the 6-game series was awarded the Silver Boot. A 30-inch (760 mm) tall display of a size-15 cowboy boot cast in silver, complete with a custom, handmade spur. If the series was split (3–3), the winner was the club which scored the most runs over the course of the series.

In 2013, the Astros joined the American League West with the Rangers and changed their rivalry from an interleague to an intra-division rivalry, the Astros played their first game in the American League against the Rangers on Sunday Night Baseball that season. In 2015, both teams made the playoffs and were in a tight division race during most of the season. In 2023, they met in the postseason for the first time, as the Rangers defeated the Astros in seven games for the American League pennant, with the road team winning all seven games.

=== Los Angeles Angels ===
The Rangers' rivalry with the Angels has been said to have developed over a domination in the division between the two teams, and also in recent years more animosity between the two teams due to players who have played for both teams, including Nolan Ryan, Mike Napoli, Darren Oliver, Vladimir Guerrero, C. J. Wilson, and Josh Hamilton. In 2012, Wilson played a joke on Napoli, his former teammate, by tweeting his phone number, causing Napoli to exchange words with Wilson. The feuds go back to two incidents between Angels second baseman Adam Kennedy and Rangers catcher Gerald Laird which led to punches being thrown.

The Angels and Rangers have each pitched a perfect game against each other, making them the only pair of MLB teams to have done so. Mike Witt pitched a perfect game for the Angels against the Rangers in 1984 at Arlington Stadium and Kenny Rogers for the Rangers against the Angels in 1994.

== Minor league affiliations ==
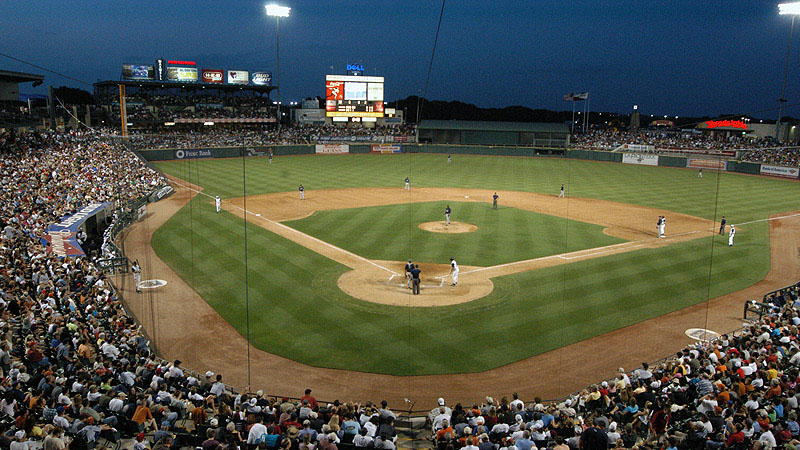
The Dell Diamond is the home of the Round Rock Express, the Rangers' Triple-A affiliate.

The Texas Rangers farm system consists of seven minor league affiliates.

| Class | Team | League | Location | Ballpark | Affiliated |
|---|---|---|---|---|---|
| Triple-A | Round Rock Express | Pacific Coast League | Round Rock, Texas | Dell Diamond | 2021 |
| Double-A | Frisco RoughRiders | Texas League | Frisco, Texas | Riders Field | 2003 |
| High-A | Hub City Spartanburgers | South Atlantic League | Spartanburg, South Carolina | Fifth Third Park | 2025 |
| Single-A | Hickory Crawdads | Carolina League | Hickory, North Carolina | L. P. Frans Stadium | 2009 |
| Rookie | ACL Rangers | Arizona Complex League | Surprise, Arizona | Surprise Stadium | 2003 |
| Rookie | DSL Rangers Blue | Dominican Summer League | Boca Chica, Santo Domingo | Texas Rangers Dominican Academy | 2014 |
| Rookie | DSL Rangers Red | Dominican Summer League | Boca Chica, Santo Domingo | Texas Rangers Dominican Academy | 2014 |

== See also ==
- List of Texas Rangers first-round draft picks
- List of Texas Rangers managers
- List of Texas Rangers no-hitters
- List of Texas Rangers Opening Day starting pitchers
- List of Texas Rangers owners and executives
- Lone Star Series – rivalry with the Houston Astros
- Texas Rangers award winners and league leaders

Awards and achievements
| Preceded by Houston Astros; 2022 | World Series champions Texas Rangers; 2023 | Succeeded by Los Angeles Dodgers; 2024–2025 |
| Preceded by New York Yankees; 2009 | American League champions 2010–2011 | Succeeded by Detroit Tigers; 2012 |
| Preceded by Houston Astros; 2021–2022 | American League champions 2023 | Succeeded by New York Yankees; 2024 |
