= Dave Barnett =

American sports announcer (born 1958)

- Born: David Lane Barnett; April 27, 1958 (age 68); Denton, Texas, U.S.
- Education: University of North Texas
- Sports commentary career
- Team(s): Dallas Mavericks (1981–88); San Antonio Spurs (1988–96); Texas Rangers (1990, 2009–12); North Texas Mean Green (2015–present)
- Genre: Play-by-play
- Sport(s): American football, baseball, basketball

David Lane Barnett (born April 27, 1958) is an American play-by-play broadcaster who calls Big 12 baseball games on Fox Sports 1 and football and men's basketball for the University of North Texas (UNT). He was formerly an ESPN personality and a radio and television play-by-play announcer for the Texas Rangers.

== Broadcast career ==
Before working for ESPN, Barnett served as the announcer for the Dallas Mavericks from 1981 to 1988, the San Antonio Spurs from 1988 to 1996, the Texas Rangers in 1990, and Southwest Conference football and basketball on Raycom Sports. In 2009, Barnett's contract with ESPN ended, allowing him to return to the Rangers, where he served as a radio broadcaster. On May 26, 2011, the Rangers announced that Barnett would be replacing John Rhadigan as the Rangers television play-by-play announcer.

=== June 18, 2012 on-air incident ===
During a Rangers/Padres broadcast on Monday, June 18, 2012, from Petco Park in San Diego, Barnett suddenly began making nonsensical statements during the bottom of the eighth inning. Rangers pitching coach Mike Maddux was concluding a visit to the mound with pitcher Mike Adams when Barnett, without warning, said, "Go-ahead run is at fifth [pause] on what Adams is insisting on calling it a botched robbery. What actually happened was, his henchmen [pause] took a piece literally out of...." At that point, Barnett's voice trailed off. It sounded as though he was struggling to say the words "my" and then "his," but could not do so. There was initial speculation that the broadcast production crew had turned off his microphone, but they actually had not done so. For about twenty seconds, Barnett was silent, with viewers hearing only ambient noise from the ballpark. Then, just as suddenly as the oddity appeared, it was over. Barnett began speaking again as if nothing had happened, and he finished the game without further incident.

The Rangers sent Barnett home to Denton, Texas for tests. For the rest of the series, Barnett's duties were assumed by Rangers radio announcer Steve Busby. One week after the incident, Barnett (who had not returned to work since it occurred) said that the preliminary medical diagnosis was that he had suffered "a complicated migraine." He also said that he had no memory of the incident, and that, after the game, he walked back to his hotel with his broadcasting partner, Tom Grieve, and went to bed. He further stated that he had no knowledge of what had happened until his wife called him the next morning and told him about the national attention that he was receiving. Barnett called the incident "surreal."

=== Departure from the Rangers ===
Barnett never returned to the Rangers' broadcast booth after the June 18, 2012 incident. On July 2, 2012, Barnett said in a statement that he was taking an indefinite medical leave of absence that he expected would last for the remainder of the 2012 season. He said in a telephone interview at the time that medical specialists were in disagreement as to what had caused his problem. Steve Busby continued as Barnett's replacement as the television play-by-play announcer. On November 1, 2012, the Rangers issued a statement to the effect that they would not be renewing Barnett's contract, which had expired at the end of the 2012 season.

=== Subsequent work ===
On September 4, 2012, Barnett announced that he would do the television play-by-play for two football games of the University of North Texas, the school from which Barnett graduated in 1979 (when it was called North Texas State University). He broadcast the first game on September 8, 2012, with no problems. He said at the time that, despite a battery of tests, doctors had not been able to determine what had caused his sudden incoherence in June. On November 10, 2012, Barnett broadcast his second UNT football game that season, again without incident. In May 2013, he did the play-by-play for Fox Sports Southwest's television broadcast of a college baseball game between Oklahoma State and West Virginia. In 2014, he was hired to be the play-by-play voice of Big 12 Conference baseball on Fox Sports 1. Beginning in 2015, he replaced fellow UNT alumnus George Dunham as the radio voice of Mean Green football and men's basketball.

=== Awards and nominations ===
Barnett has twice won UPI Radio Commentator of the Year awards.

== Personal life ==
Barnett lives in Denton, Texas.
