= 2025 Texas Rangers season =

Major League Baseball season

2025 Texas Rangers
- League: American League
- Division: West
- Ballpark: Globe Life Field
- City: Arlington
- Record: 81–81 (.500)
- Divisional place: 3rd
- Owners: Ray Davis & Bob R. Simpson
- President of baseball operations: Chris Young
- General managers: Ross Fenstermaker
- Managers: Bruce Bochy
- Television: Rangers Sports Network; Victory+ (direct-to-consumer streaming)
- Radio: KRLD 105.3 FM (English); KZMP 1540 AM (Spanish)
- Stats: ESPN.com; Baseball Reference

The 2025 Texas Rangers season was the 65th of the Texas Rangers franchise overall, their 54th in Arlington as the Rangers, and the 6th season at Globe Life Field. Although the Rangers improved on their 78–84 record from last year they missed the playoffs for the second straight season, losing 11 of their final 13 games to finish at exactly an 81–81 (.500) record. This was Bruce Bochy’s last season as Rangers’ manager, as they mutually agreed to part ways three days after the season ended.

The Texas Rangers drew an average home attendance of 29,593, the 17th-highest of all MLB teams.

== Previous season ==
The team's record in their 2024 season was 78–84.

== Offseason ==
In the off-season, Matt Duffy and David Robertson elected free agency, Nathan Eovaldi was re-signed on a 3-year deal, Joc Pederson and Kyle Higashioka were signed to 2-year deals, Chris Martin, Jacob Webb, Hoby Milner, Shawn Armstrong, Luke Jackson, Patrick Corbin, and Luis Curvelo were all signed to 1-year deals. Jake Burger was received in a trade with the Miami Marlins for three minor league prospects. Nathaniel Lowe was traded to the Washington Nationals, and Grant Anderson was traded to the Milwaukee Brewers for a minor league pitcher.

In November 2024, the Rangers announced Justin Viele as the new hitting coach.

== Regular season ==
=== May ===
On May 2, 2025, the Rangers demoted first-baseman Jake Burger to the minors to reset offensively after offensive struggles in April. Blaine Crim was promoted to take his spot and made his major league debut on May 3 against the Seattle Mariners.

On May 4, the Rangers dismissed offensive coordinator Donnie Ecker after the team struggled offensively throughout the first month of playing. The following day, Bret Boone was named the Rangers' new hitting coach.

== Season standings ==
=== American League West ===
AL West
Team	W	L	Pct.	GB	Home	Road
Seattle Mariners	90	72	.556	—	51‍–‍30	39‍–‍42
Houston Astros	87	75	.537	3	46‍–‍35	41‍–‍40
Texas Rangers	81	81	.500	9	48‍–‍33	33‍–‍48
Athletics	76	86	.469	14	36‍–‍45	40‍–‍41
Los Angeles Angels	72	90	.444	18	39‍–‍42	33‍–‍48

=== American League Wild Card ===
Division leaders
Team	W	L	Pct.
Toronto Blue Jays	94	68	.580
Seattle Mariners	90	72	.556
Cleveland Guardians	88	74	.543

Wild Card teams (Top 3 teams qualify for postseason)
Team	W	L	Pct.	GB
New York Yankees	94	68	.580	+7
Boston Red Sox	89	73	.549	+2
Detroit Tigers	87	75	.537	—
Houston Astros	87	75	.537	—
Kansas City Royals	82	80	.506	5
Texas Rangers	81	81	.500	6
Tampa Bay Rays	77	85	.475	10
Athletics	76	86	.469	11
Baltimore Orioles	75	87	.463	12
Los Angeles Angels	72	90	.444	15
Minnesota Twins	70	92	.432	17
Chicago White Sox	60	102	.370	27

=== Record vs. opponents ===
==== Record vs. American League ====
2025 American League record Source: MLB Standings Grid – 2025
Team	ATH	BAL	BOS	CWS	CLE	DET	HOU	KC	LAA	MIN	NYY	SEA	TB	TEX	TOR	NL
Athletics	—	4–2	3–3	5–1	2–4	4–2	8–5	4–2	4–9	4–3	2–4	6–7	3–3	5–8	2–5	20–28
Baltimore	2–4	—	5–8	6–0	3–4	1–5	3–4	2–4	5–1	0–6	4–9	5–1	7–6	2–4	6–7	24–24
Boston	3–3	8–5	—	4–3	4–2	2–4	4–2	4–2	1–5	3–3	9–4	3–3	10–3	3–4	5–8	26–22
Chicago	1–5	0–6	3–4	—	2–11	5–8	3–3	3–10	3–3	8–5	1–6	1–5	4–2	2–4	3–3	21–27
Cleveland	4–2	4–3	2–4	11–2	—	8–5	4–2	8–5	3–3	9–4	3–3	2–4	5–2	2–4	3–3	20–28
Detroit	2–4	5–1	4–2	8–5	5–8	—	4–2	9–4	5–2	8–5	4–2	2–4	3–3	2–4	3–4	23–25
Houston	5–8	4–3	2–4	3–3	2–4	2–4	—	3–3	8–5	5–1	3-3	5–8	3–4	7–6	4–2	31–17
Kansas City	2–4	4–2	2–4	10–3	5–8	4–9	3–3	—	3–3	7–6	0–6	3–4	3–3	6-1	4–2	26–22
Los Angeles	9–4	1–5	5–1	3–3	3–3	2–5	5–8	3–3	—	2–4	3–4	4–9	3–3	5–8	2–4	22–26
Minnesota	3–4	6–0	3–3	5–8	4–9	5–8	1–5	6–7	4–2	—	2–4	3–4	3–3	3–3	2–4	20–28
New York	4–2	9–4	4–9	6–1	3–3	2–4	3–3	6–0	4–3	4–2	—	5–1	9–4	4–2	5–8	26–22
Seattle	7–6	1–5	3–3	5–1	4–2	4–2	8–5	4–3	9–4	4–3	1–5	—	3–3	10–3	2–4	25–23
Tampa Bay	3–3	6–7	3–10	2–4	2–5	3–3	4–3	3–3	3–3	3–3	4–9	3–3	—	3–3	7–6	28–20
Texas	8–5	4–2	4–3	4–2	4–2	4–2	6–7	1-6	8–5	3–3	2–4	3–10	3–3	—	2–4	25–23
Toronto	5–2	7–6	8–5	3–3	3–3	4–3	2–4	2–4	4–2	4–2	8–5	4–2	6–7	4–2	—	30–18

Updated with the results of all games through September 28, 2025.

==== Record vs. National League ====
2025 American League record vs. National League Source: MLB Standings
Team	AZ	ATL	CHC	CIN	COL	LAD	MIA	MIL	NYM	PHI	PIT	SD	SF	STL	WSH
Athletics	1–2	2–1	0–3	3–0	2–1	1–2	2–1	1–2	1–2	1–2	1–2	1–2	1–5	1–2	2–1
Baltimore	1–2	3–0	1–2	1–2	2–1	2–1	1–2	1–2	2–1	1–2	3–0	3–0	1–2	1–2	1–5
Boston	1–2	3–3	1–2	2–1	3–0	2–1	2–1	0–3	2–1	1–2	1–2	1–2	1–2	3–0	3–0
Chicago	1–2	1–2	1–5	2–1	2–1	0–3	2–1	1–2	1–2	2–1	3–0	1–2	2–1	0–3	2–1
Cleveland	1–2	0–3	0–3	1–5	2–1	1–2	2–1	2–1	3–0	1–2	3–0	0–3	2–1	0–3	2–1
Detroit	3–0	0–3	2–1	1–2	3–0	0–3	1–2	1–2	1–2	1–2	2–4	2–1	3–0	2–1	1–2
Houston	3–0	2–1	2–1	2–1	4–2	3–0	2–1	1–2	2–1	3–0	2–1	2–1	0–3	1–2	2–1
Kansas City	2–1	2–1	2–1	1–2	3–0	1–2	1–2	1–2	1–2	1–2	3–0	1–2	2–1	3–3	2–1
Los Angeles	2–1	2–1	0–3	1–2	1–2	6–0	1–2	0–3	0–3	2–1	1–2	1–2	2–1	2–1	1–2
Minnesota	1–2	0–3	2–1	1–2	1–2	1–2	1–2	2–4	2–1	1–2	2–1	2–1	3–0	0–3	1–2
New York	1–2	2–1	1–2	1–2	2–1	1–2	0–3	3–0	3–3	1–2	2–1	2–1	1–2	3–0	3–0
Seattle	0–3	2–1	2–1	2–1	3–0	0–3	2–1	1–2	1–2	0–3	3–0	5–1	0–3	3–0	1–2
Tampa Bay	2–1	2–1	1–2	0–3	2–1	1–2	3–3	2–1	3–0	0–3	2–1	3–0	2–1	2–1	3–0
Texas	2–4	3–0	1–2	2–1	3–0	1–2	0–3	3–0	2–1	0–3	2–1	1–2	1–2	2–1	2–1
Toronto	2–1	2–1	2–1	2–1	3–0	1–2	2–1	1–2	0–3	2–4	1–2	3–0	3–0	3–0	3–0

Updated with the results of all games through September 28, 2025.

== Game log ==
=== Regular season ===
Legend
Rangers Win	Rangers Loss	Game postponed	Eliminated from playoff spot

2025 Game Log: 81–81 (Home: 48–33; Away: 33–48)
March/April: 16–15 (Home: 11–5; Away: 5–10)

#	Date	Opponent	Score	Win	Loss	Save	Attendance	Record	Streak
1	March 27	Red Sox	2–5	Chapman (1–0)	Jackson (0–1)	Slaten (1)	37,587	0–1	L1
2	March 28	Red Sox	4–1	Leiter (1–0)	Houck (0–1)	Jackson (1)	26,766	1–1	W1
3	March 29	Red Sox	4–3	Milner (1–0)	Buehler (0–1)	Martin (1)	32,251	2–1	W2
4	March 30	Red Sox	3–2	Armstrong (1–0)	Fitts (0–1)	Jackson (2)	29,137	3–1	W3
5	March 31	@ Reds	3–14	Singer (1–0)	Rocker (0–1)	—	10,533	3–2	L1
6	April 1	@ Reds	1–0	Eovaldi (1–0)	Spiers (0–1)	—	14,852	4–2	W1
7	April 2	@ Reds	1–0	Leiter (2–0)	Greene (0–1)	Jackson (3)	13,322	5–2	W2
8	April 4	Rays	5–2	Mahle (1–0)	Littell (0–2)	Jackson (4)	24,483	6–2	W3
9	April 5	Rays	6–4	Garcia (1–0)	Montgomery (0–1)	Jackson (5)	29,058	7–2	W4
10	April 6	Rays	4–3	Webb (1–0)	Uceta (0–1)	—	25,614	8–2	W5
11	April 7	@ Cubs	0–7	Steele (3–1)	Eovaldi (1–1)	—	27,017	8–3	L1
12	April 8	@ Cubs	6–10	Hodge (1–0)	Martin (0–1)	—	27,694	8–4	L2
13	April 9	@ Cubs	6–2	Mahle (2–0)	Imanaga (2–1)	—	23,590	9–4	W1
14	April 11	@ Mariners	3–5	Vargas (1–1)	Martin (0–2)	Muñoz (5)	28,366	9–5	L1
15	April 12	@ Mariners	2–9	Woo (2–0)	Rocker (0–2)	—	29,943	9–6	L2
16	April 13	@ Mariners	1–3	Gilbert (1–1)	Eovaldi (1–2)	Muñoz (6)	25,100	9–7	L3
17	April 15	Angels	4–0	Mahle (3–0)	Kikuchi (0–3)	—	24,501	10–7	W1
18	April 16	Angels	3–1	Corbin (1–0)	Soriano (2–2)	Jackson (6)	20,535	11–7	W2
19	April 17	Angels	5–3	Rocker (1–2)	Kochanowicz (1–2)	Garcia (1)	26,279	12–7	W3
20	April 18	Dodgers	0–3	Yamamoto (3–1)	deGrom (0–1)	Scott (7)	38,623	12–8	L1
21	April 19	Dodgers	4–3	Webb (2–0)	Yates (1–1)	—	39,244	13–8	W1
22	April 20	Dodgers	0–1	Casparius (2–0)	Martin (0–3)	Scott (8)	38,110	13–9	L1
23	April 22	@ Athletics	8–5	Corbin (2–0)	Bido (2–2)	Jackson (7)	10,059	14–9	W1
24	April 23	@ Athletics	2–5	Sears (3–2)	Rocker (1–3)	Miller (7)	9,806	14–10	L1
25	April 24	@ Athletics	3–4	Holman (1–0)	Jackson (0–2)	—	9,008	14–11	L2
26	April 25	@ Giants	2–0	Eovaldi (2–2)	Verlander (0–2)	Jackson (8)	40,080	15–11	W1
27	April 26	@ Giants	2–3	Walker (1–1)	Webb (2–1)	—	40,153	15–12	L1
28	April 27	@ Giants	2–3	Doval (2–1)	Jackson (0–3)	—	40,118	15–13	L2
29	April 28	Athletics	1–2	Sears (4–2)	Corbin (2–1)	Miller (9)	19,818	15–14	L3
30	April 29	Athletics	15–2	deGrom (1–1)	Lopez (0–1)	Dunning (1)	24,452	16–14	W1
31	April 30	Athletics	1–7	Holman (3–0)	Garcia (1–1)	—	19,803	16–15	L1

May: 12–16 (Home: 8–8; Road: 4–8)

#	Date	Opponent	Score	Win	Loss	Save	Attendance	Record	Streak
32	May 1	Athletics	0–3	Springs (4–3)	Mahle (3–1)	Miller (10)	30,808	16–16	L2
33	May 2	Mariners	1–13	Woo (4–1)	Leiter (2–1)	—	29,074	16–17	L3
34	May 3	Mariners	1–2	Speier (1–0)	Martin (0–4)	Muñoz (12)	26,726	16–18	L4
35	May 4	Mariners	8–1	deGrom (2–1)	Evans (1–1)	—	27,812	17–18	W1
36	May 6	@ Red Sox	6–1	Eovaldi (3–2)	Giolito (0–1)	—	29,858	18–18	W2
37	May 7	@ Red Sox	4–6	Bernardino (2–1)	Webb (2–2)	Chapman (5)	31,437	18–19	L1
38	May 8	@ Red Sox	0–5	Slaten (1–3)	Leiter (2–2)	—	37,800	18–20	L2
39	May 9	@ Tigers	1–2	Skubal (4–2)	Corbin (2–2)	Vest (4)	28,407	18–21	L3
40	May 10	@ Tigers	10–3	deGrom (3–1)	Flaherty (1–5)	—	40,844	19–21	W1
41	May 11	@ Tigers	6–1	Eovaldi (4–2)	Olson (4–3)	—	36,138	20–21	W2
42	May 12	Rockies	2–1	Mahle (4–1)	Dollander (2–4)	Webb (1)	23,123	21–21	W3
43	May 13	Rockies	4–1	Leiter (3–2)	Freeland (0–6)	Armstrong (1)	19,924	22–21	W4
44	May 14	Rockies	8–3	Corbin (3–2)	Senzatela (1–7)	—	18,679	23–21	W5
45	May 15	Astros	1–0	deGrom (4–1)	Brown (6–2)	Armstrong (2)	28,108	24–21	W6
46	May 16	Astros	3–6	Ort (1–0)	Armstrong (1–1)	—	33,035	24–22	L1
47	May 17	Astros	5–1	Mahle (5–1)	Blanco (3–4)	—	38,465	25–22	W1
48	May 18	Astros	3–4	Valdez (3–4)	Garcia (1–2)	Hader (11)	34,433	25–23	L1
49	May 20	@ Yankees	2–5	Warren (3–2)	Corbin (3–3)	Weaver (6)	30,343	25–24	L2
50	May 21	@ Yankees	3–4	Weaver (1–1)	Jackson (0–4)	—	40,359	25–25	L3
51	May 22	@ Yankees	0–1	Rodón (6–3)	Eovaldi (4–3)	Weaver (7)	43,450	25–26	L4
52	May 23	@ White Sox	1–4	Burke (3–5)	Mahle (5–2)	Wilson (1)	17,885	25–27	L5
53	May 24	@ White Sox	5–10	Vasil (3–2)	Milner (1–1)	—	19,240	25–28	L6
54	May 25	@ White Sox	5–4	Armstrong (2–1)	Leasure (0–4)	Garcia (2)	20,908	26–28	W1
55	May 26	Blue Jays	1–2	Gausman (5–4)	deGrom (4–2)	Hoffman (11)	33,766	26–29	L1
56	May 27	Blue Jays	2–0	Jackson (1–4)	Green (1–1)	Garcia (3)	25,818	27–29	W1
57	May 28	Blue Jays	0–2	Little (3–0)	Webb (2–3)	Hoffman (12)	20,811	27–30	L1
58	May 30	Cardinals	11–1	Leiter (4–2)	Liberatore (3–4)	Boushley (1)	28,679	28–30	W1
59	May 31	Cardinals	0–2	Gray (6–1)	Corbin (3–4)	Helsley (13)	29,062	28–31	L1

June: 13–13 (Home: 5–6; Road: 8–7)

#	Date	Opponent	Score	Win	Loss	Save	Attendance	Record	Streak
60	June 1	Cardinals	8–1	deGrom (5–2)	Fedde (3–5)	—	28,138	29–31	W1
61	June 3	@ Rays	1–5	Rasmussen (5–4)	Mahle (5–3)	—	9,131	29–32	L1
62	June 4	@ Rays	4–5	Baz (5–3)	Rocker (1–4)	Fairbanks (11)	8,994	29–33	L2
63	June 5	@ Rays	3–4	Sulser (2–1)	Garcia (1–3)	—	10,046	29–34	L3
64	June 6	@ Nationals	0–2	Soroka (3–3)	Corbin (3–5)	Finnegan (18)	27,160	29–35	L4
65	June 7	@ Nationals	5–0	deGrom (6–2)	Parker (4–6)	—	27,160	30–35	W1
66	June 8	@ Nationals	4–2	Webb (3–3)	Williams (3–7)	Garcia (4)	24,897	31–35	W2
67	June 10	@ Twins	16–4	Mahle (6–3)	Woods Richardson (2–3)	—	24,765	32–35	W3
68	June 11	@ Twins	2–6	Festa (1–1)	Leiter (4–3)	—	18,904	32–36	L1
69	June 12	@ Twins	16–3	Corbin (4–5)	Ober (4–3)	—	23,995	33–36	W1
70	June 13	White Sox	3–1	Webb (4–3)	Houser (2–2)	Garcia (5)	31,934	34–36	W2
71	June 14	White Sox	5–4 (11)	Latz (1–0)	Alexander (3–7)	—	38,122	35–36	W3
72	June 15	White Sox	2–1	Rocker (2–4)	Civale (1–3)	Jackson (9)	38,037	36–36	W4
73	June 17	Royals	1–6	Lugo (4–5)	Leiter (4–4)	—	34,408	36–37	L1
74	June 18	Royals	3–6	Bubic (6–4)	Corbin (4–6)	Estévez (20)	26,520	36–38	L2
75	June 19	Royals	1–4	Wacha (4–6)	Armstrong (2–2)	Estévez (21)	37,308	36–39	L3
76	June 20	@ Pirates	6–2	deGrom (7–2)	Burrows (1–2)	—	31,327	37–39	W1
77	June 21	@ Pirates	3–2	Rocker (3–4)	Keller (1–10)	Martin (2)	23,819	38–39	W2
78	June 22	@ Pirates	3–8	Falter (6–3)	Leiter (4–5)	—	20,341	38–40	L1
79	June 23	@ Orioles	0–6	Rogers (1–0)	Corbin (4–7)	—	13,929	38–41	L2
80	June 24	@ Orioles	6–5 (10)	Jackson (2–4)	Domínguez (2–2)	Garcia (6)	16,909	39–41	W1
81	June 25	@ Orioles	7–0	deGrom (8–2)	Young (0–2)	—	22,828	40–41	W2
82	June 27	Mariners	6–7 (12)	Bazardo (3–0)	Armstrong (2–3)	—	30,228	40–42	L1
83	June 28	Mariners	3–2 (10)	Armstrong (3–3)	Muñoz (3–1)	—	35,506	41–42	W1
84	June 29	Mariners	4–6 (12)	Thornton (2–0)	Winn (0–1)	—	31,126	41–43	L1
85	June 30	Orioles	6–10 (11)	Akin (3–0)	Milner (1–2)	—	27,420	41–44	L2

July: 16–9 (Home: 10–1; Road: 6–8)

#	Date	Opponent	Score	Win	Loss	Save	Attendance	Record	Streak
86	July 1	Orioles	10–2	deGrom (9–2)	Young (0–3)	Latz (1)	30,933	42–44	W1
87	July 2	Orioles	6–0	Eovaldi (5–3)	Sugano (6–5)	Dunning (2)	27,636	43–44	W2
88	July 4	@ Padres	2–3 (10)	Morejón (5–3)	Garcia (1–4)	—	45,144	43–45	L1
89	July 5	@ Padres	7–4	Corbin (5–7)	Kolek (3–4)	Armstrong (3)	43,297	44–45	W1
90	July 6	@ Padres	1–4	Hart (3–2)	Leiter (4–6)	Suárez (25)	40,711	44–46	L1
91	July 7	@ Angels	5–6	Jansen (2–2)	Martin (0–5)	—	24,382	44–47	L2
92	July 8	@ Angels	13–1	Eovaldi (6–3)	Soriano (6–6)	—	26,368	45–47	W1
93	July 9	@ Angels	8–11	Fermín (2–0)	Jackson (2–5)	Jansen (16)	25,462	45–48	L1
94	July 10	@ Angels	11–4	Corbin (6–7)	Kochanowicz (3–9)	—	27,071	46–48	W1
95	July 11	@ Astros	7–3	Leiter (5–6)	McCullers Jr. (2–4)	—	40,233	47–48	W2
96	July 12	@ Astros	4–5 (11)	Sousa (3–0)	Garcia (1–5)	—	39,696	47–49	L1
97	July 13	@ Astros	5–1	Eovaldi (7–3)	Brown (9–4)	—	37,939	48–49	W1
95th All-Star Game: Cumberland, GA
98	July 18	Tigers	2–0	Martin (1–5)	Kahnle (1–3)	Garcia (7)	36,068	49–49	W2
99	July 19	Tigers	4–1	Rocker (4–4)	Montero (4–2)	—	37,045	50–49	W3
100	July 20	Tigers	1–2	Holton (5–3)	Martin (1–6)	Vest (16)	33,209	50–50	L1
101	July 21	Athletics	7–2	Leiter (6–6)	Lopez (3–6)	—	26,430	51–50	W1
102	July 22	Athletics	6–2	deGrom (10–2)	Newcomb (2–5)	—	23,032	52–50	W2
103	July 23	Athletics	2–1	Gray (1–0)	Perkins (0–1)	Garcia (8)	27,719	53–50	W3
104	July 25	Braves	8–3	Eovaldi (8–3)	Wentz (2–2)	—	34,643	54–50	W4
105	July 26	Braves	6–5 (10)	Armstrong (4–3)	De Los Santos (3–3)	—	38,318	55–50	W5
106	July 27	Braves	8–1	Leiter (7–6)	Elder (4–7)	—	35,914	56–50	W6
107	July 28	@ Angels	4–6	Brogdon (2–1)	deGrom (10–3)	Jansen (19)	24,538	56–51	L1
108	July 29	@ Angels	5–8	Detmers (4–2)	Gray (1–1)	Jansen (20)	26,390	56–52	L2
109	July 30	@ Angels	6–3	Eovaldi (9–3)	Soriano (7–8)	Garcia (9)	27,162	57–52	W1
110	July 31	@ Mariners	0–6	Kirby (6–5)	Rocker (4–5)	—	28,293	57–53	L1

August: 14–14 (Home: 8–7; Road: 6–7)

#	Date	Opponent	Score	Win	Loss	Save	Attendance	Record	Streak
111	August 1	@ Mariners	3–4	Bazardo (5–0)	Garcia (1–6)	—	40,984	57–54	L2
112	August 2	@ Mariners	6–4 (11)	Curvelo (1–0)	Legumina (4–6)	—	37,266	58–54	W1
113	August 3	@ Mariners	4–5	Evans (5–4)	deGrom (10–4)	Muñoz (25)	29,510	58–55	L1
114	August 4	Yankees	8–5 (10)	Coulombe (2–0)	Bird (4–2)	—	33,320	59–55	W1
115	August 5	Yankees	2–0	Eovaldi (10–3)	Williams (3–4)	Maton (3)	35,399	60–55	W2
116	August 6	Yankees	2–3	Leiter Jr. (5–6)	Garcia (1–7)	Bednar (18)	35,565	60–56	L1
117	August 8	Phillies	1–9	Sánchez (11–3)	Kelly (9–7)	—	27,575	60–57	L2
118	August 9	Phillies	2–3	Luzardo (11–5)	deGrom (10–5)	Durán (19)	38,471	60–58	L3
119	August 10	Phillies	2–4	Wheeler (10–5)	Corbin (6–8)	Durán (20)	32,444	60–59	L4
120	August 11	Diamondbacks	7–6 (10)	Maton (2–3)	Saalfrank (0–1)	—	25,781	61–59	W1
121	August 12	Diamondbacks	2–3	Beeks (3–1)	Coulombe (2–1)	Morillo (1)	18,268	61–60	L1
122	August 13	Diamondbacks	4–6	Curtiss (2–0)	Maton (2–4)	Saalfrank (1)	26,021	61–61	L2
123	August 15	@ Blue Jays	5–6	Varland (4–3)	Maton (2–5)	Hoffman (28)	42,260	61–62	L3
124	August 16	@ Blue Jays	2–14	Lauer (8–2)	Corbin (6–9)	—	42,686	61–63	L4
125	August 17	@ Blue Jays	10–4	Eovaldi (11–3)	Berríos (9–5)	Armstrong (4)	42,549	62–63	W1
126	August 18	@ Royals	3–4	Wacha (8–9)	Leiter (7–7)	Estévez (32)	12,747	62–64	L1
127	August 19	@ Royals	2–5	Zerpa (4–1)	Milner (1–3)	Schreiber (1)	14,176	62–65	L2
128	August 20	@ Royals	6–3	Milner (2–3)	Long (1–3)	—	14,312	63–65	W1
129	August 21	@ Royals	4–6	Zerpa (5–1)	Webb (4–4)	Estévez (33)	13,527	63–66	L1
130	August 22	Guardians	4–3	Garcia (2–7)	Smith (5–5)	—	26,729	64–66	W1
131	August 23	Guardians	10–0	Leiter (8–7)	Allen (7–10)	—	37,006	65–66	W2
132	August 24	Guardians	5–0	Kelly (10–7)	Williams (8–5)	—	34,577	66–66	W3
133	August 25	Angels	0–4	Soriano (9–9)	deGrom (10–6)	—	22,949	66–67	L1
134	August 26	Angels	7–3	Corbin (7–9)	Kikuchi (6–9)	—	28,485	67–67	W1
135	August 27	Angels	20–3	Webb (5–4)	Kochanowicz (3–11)	—	22,353	68–67	W2
136	August 29	@ Athletics	5–2	Leiter (9–7)	Springs (10–9)	Armstrong (5)	8,413	69–67	W3
137	August 30	@ Athletics	9–3	Kelly (11–7)	Barnett (0–1)	—	8,941	70–67	W4
138	August 31	@ Athletics	9–6	deGrom (11–6)	Ginn (2–6)	—	8,716	71–67	W5

September: 10–14 (Home: 6–6; Road: 4–8)

#	Date	Opponent	Score	Win	Loss	Save	Attendance	Record	Streak
139	September 1	@ Diamondbacks	7–5 (10)	Martin (2–6)	Burgos (1–1)	Armstrong (6)	26,489	72–67	W6
140	September 2	@ Diamondbacks	3–5	Beeks (5–1)	Milner (2–4)	Rashi (2)	22,046	72–68	L1
141	September 3	@ Diamondbacks	0–2	Gallen (11–13)	Leiter (9–8)	Woodford (3)	14,921	72–69	L2
142	September 5	Astros	4–3 (12)	Garcia (3–7)	McCullers Jr. (2–5)	—	31,662	73–69	W1
143	September 6	Astros	0–11	Brown (11–7)	deGrom (11–7)	—	38,332	73–70	L1
144	September 7	Astros	4–2	Maton (3–5)	Valdez (12–9)	Armstrong (7)	35,449	74–70	W1
145	September 8	Brewers	5–0	Latz (2–0)	Quintana (11–6)	—	20,791	75–70	W2
146	September 9	Brewers	5–4	Milner (3–4)	Ashby (3–2)	Armstrong (8)	24,581	76–70	W3
147	September 10	Brewers	6–3	Kelly (12–7)	Peralta (16–6)	Maton (4)	24,682	77–70	W4
148	September 12	@ Mets	8–3	deGrom (12–7)	Tong (1–2)	—	41,040	78–70	W5
149	September 13	@ Mets	3–2	Maton (4–5)	Díaz (6–3)	Armstrong (9)	41,752	79–70	W6
150	September 14	@ Mets	2–5 (10)	Stanek (4–6)	Curvelo (1–1)	—	40,024	79–71	L1
151	September 15	@ Astros	3–6	Okert (3–2)	Leiter (9–9)	Abreu (6)	30,484	79–72	L2
152	September 16	@ Astros	5–6	Gordon (5–4)	Kelly (12–8)	Abreu (7)	35,026	79–73	L3
153	September 17	@ Astros	2–5	Javier (2–3)	deGrom (12–8)	King (2)	33,084	79–74	L4
154	September 19	Marlins	4–6 (12)	Soriano (2–0)	Corbin (7–10)	—	26,374	79–75	L5
155	September 20	Marlins	3–4	Gibson (4–5)	Leiter (9–10)	Faucher (15)	36,054	79–76	L6
156	September 21	Marlins	2–4	Bachar (8–2)	Kelly (12–9)	Soriano (1)	27,331	79–77	L7
157	September 23	Twins	1–4	Matthews (5–6)	Corbin (7–11)	Sands (3)	24,674	79–78	L8
158	September 24	Twins	4–1	Garcia (4–7)	Adams (1–4)	Maton (5)	24,622	80–78	W1
159	September 25	Twins	0–4	Ober (6–9)	Mahle (6–4)	—	23,298	80–79	L1
160	September 26	@ Guardians	7–3	Leiter (10–10)	Cecconi (7–7)	—	36,275	81–79	W1
161	September 27	@ Guardians	2–3	Smith (8–5)	Garcia (4–8)	—	36,000	81–80	L1
162	September 28	@ Guardians	8–9 (10)	Kent (1–0)	Corniell (0–1)	—	31,054	81–81	L2

== Roster ==
2025 Texas Rangers
Roster
Pitchers: 43 Shawn Armstrong; 70 Caleb Boushley; 30 Marc Church; 46 Patrick Corbin; 59 José Corniell; 54 Danny Coulombe; 57 Luis Curvelo; 48 Jacob deGrom; 33 Dane Dunning; 58 Carl Edwards Jr.; 17 Nathan Eovaldi; 58 Gerson Garabito; 62 Robert Garcia; 22 Jon Gray; 54 Codi Heuer; 77 Luke Jackson; 23 Merrill Kelly; 67 Jake Latz; 35 Jack Leiter; 51 Tyler Mahle; 55 Chris Martin; 88 Phil Maton; 41 Hoby Milner; 80 Kumar Rocker; 71 Jacob Webb; 60 Cole Winn	Catchers: 18 Tucker Barnhart; 28 Jonah Heim; 11 Kyle Higashioka; Infielders: 23 Nick Ahmed; 21 Jake Burger; 13 Blaine Crim; 20 Ezequiel Durán; 56 Justin Foscue; 39 Cody Freeman; 6 Josh Jung; 25 Dylan Moore; 24 Jonathan Ornelas; 4 Joc Pederson; 5 Corey Seager; 2 Marcus Semien; 8 Josh H. Smith; 16 Donovan Solano; 44 Rowdy Tellez	Outfielders: 32 Evan Carter; 53 Adolis García; 0 Sam Haggerty; 38 Dustin Harris; 24 Michael Helman; 36 Wyatt Langford; 23,33 Billy McKinney; 19 Alejandro Osuna; 1 Kevin Pillar; 3 Leody Taveras	Manager: 15 Bruce Bochy; Coaches: 27 Tony Beasley (third base); 78 Bret Boone (hitting); 85 Dave Bush (assistant pitching); 91 Chase Casali (bullpen catcher); 86 Seth Conner (assistant hitting); 14 Donnie Ecker (offensive coordinator); 87 Brett Hayes (quality control); 31 Mike Maddux (pitching); 90 Alejandro Martínez (bullpen catcher); 64 Corey Ragsdale (first base); 83 Jordan Tiegs (bullpen); 81 Luis Urueta (bench); 89 Justin Viele (hitting); 88 Bobby Wilson (catching)

== Player stats ==
= Indicates team leader

=== Batting ===
Note: G = Games played; AB = At bats; R = Runs scored; H = Hits; 2B = Doubles; 3B = Triples; HR = Home runs; RBI = Runs batted in; SB = Stolen bases; BB = Walks; AVG = Batting average; SLG = Slugging average

Player	G	AB	R	H	2B	3B	HR	RBI	SB	BB	AVG	SLG
Adolis García	135	507	58	115	28	0	19	75	13	28	.227	.394
Josh Smith	144	495	70	124	23	2	10	35	12	55	.251	.366
Wyatt Langford	134	489	73	118	25	1	22	62	22	74	.241	.431
Josh Jung	131	482	53	121	23	1	14	61	4	27	.251	.390
Marcus Semien	127	470	62	108	16	1	15	62	11	50	.230	.364
Jonah Heim	124	395	38	84	14	0	11	43	3	32	.213	.332
Corey Seager	102	380	61	103	19	0	21	50	3	58	.271	.487
Jake Burger	103	356	43	84	15	1	16	53	1	12	.236	.419
Kyle Higashioka	94	303	33	73	14	1	11	47	3	20	.241	.403
Joc Pederson	96	265	28	48	10	1	9	26	2	34	.181	.328
Ezequiel Durán	90	205	16	46	14	0	0	14	11	8	.224	.293
Evan Carter	63	194	31	48	9	2	5	25	14	19	.247	.392
Sam Haggerty	64	162	31	41	7	3	2	13	12	16	.253	.370
Alejandro Osuna	63	151	12	32	4	0	2	15	5	21	.212	.278
Rowdy Tellez	50	116	14	30	5	0	6	22	0	9	.259	.457
Cody Freeman	36	114	13	26	4	0	3	15	1	5	.228	.342
Michael Helman	38	99	18	23	5	1	5	20	4	7	.232	.455
Leody Taveras	30	79	7	19	3	1	1	8	6	2	.241	.342
Kevin Pillar	20	43	6	9	2	0	0	1	3	0	.209	.256
Dustin Harris	19	40	5	8	3	0	1	2	1	3	.200	.350
Dylan Moore	18	27	6	7	0	0	2	6	2	1	.259	.481
Billy McKinney	6	20	4	4	1	0	0	1	0	1	.200	.250
Tucker Barnhart	8	13	0	3	0	0	0	0	0	1	.231	.231
Blaine Crim	5	11	1	0	0	0	0	0	0	1	.000	.000
Justin Foscue	4	9	0	1	1	0	0	2	0	0	.111	.222
Nick Ahmed	5	9	1	0	0	0	0	0	1	1	.000	.000
Jonathan Ornelas	4	5	0	0	0	0	0	0	0	1	.000	.000
Donovan Solano	2	3	0	0	0	0	0	0	0	0	.000	.000
Jack Leiter	1	1	0	0	0	0	0	0	0	0	.000	.000
Totals	162	5443	684	1275	245	15	175	658	134	486	.234	.381

Source:Baseball Reference

=== Pitching ===
Note: W = Wins; L = Losses; ERA = Earned run average; G = Games pitched; GS = Games started; SV = Saves; IP = Innings pitched; H = Hits allowed; R = Runs allowed; ER = Earned runs allowed; BB = Walks allowed; SO = Strikeouts

Player	W	L	ERA	G	GS	SV	IP	H	R	ER	BB	SO
Jacob deGrom	12	8	2.97	30	30	0	172.2	122	57	57	37	185
Patrick Corbin	7	11	4.40	31	30	0	155.1	161	79	76	51	131
Jack Leiter	10	10	3.86	29	29	0	151.2	127	69	65	67	148
Nathan Eovaldi	11	3	1.73	22	22	0	130.0	90	28	25	21	129
Tyler Mahle	6	4	2.18	16	16	0	86.2	69	21	21	29	66
Jacob Latz	2	0	2.84	33	8	1	85.2	69	28	27	37	76
Shawn Armstrong	4	3	2.31	71	2	9	74.0	40	21	19	20	74
Hoby Milner	3	4	3.84	73	0	0	70.1	68	35	30	21	58
Jacob Webb	5	4	3.00	55	0	1	66.0	49	24	22	19	58
Kumar Rocker	4	5	5.74	14	14	0	64.1	71	42	41	23	56
Robert Garcia	4	8	2.95	71	0	9	64.0	58	26	21	22	68
Merrill Kelly	3	3	4.23	10	10	0	55.1	59	26	26	10	46
Caleb Boushley	0	0	6.02	25	1	1	43.1	54	33	29	14	41
Chris Martin	2	6	2.98	49	0	2	42.1	43	18	14	8	43
Cole Winn	0	1	1.51	33	0	0	41.2	23	8	7	17	35
Luke Jackson	2	5	4.11	39	0	9	35.0	32	20	16	19	24
Phil Maton	3	2	3.52	23	0	3	23.0	14	9	9	8	33
Luis Curvelo	1	1	5.68	17	0	0	19.0	17	13	12	10	20
Jon Gray	1	1	7.71	6	0	0	14.0	15	12	12	6	12
Danny Coulombe	1	1	5.25	15	0	0	12.0	11	7	7	9	12
Dane Dunning	0	0	3.38	5	0	2	10.2	9	4	4	5	10
Gerson Garabito	0	0	9.00	3	0	0	8.0	15	12	8	1	8
Marc Church	0	0	3.86	5	0	0	4.2	4	2	2	6	5
Ezequiel Durán	0	0	0.00	4	0	0	3.1	1	0	0	0	0
Carl Edwards Jr.	0	0	0.00	2	0	0	3.0	0	0	0	2	4
Tucker Barnhart	0	0	13.50	1	0	0	2.0	5	3	3	0	0
Rowdy Tellez	0	0	13.50	1	0	0	2.0	5	3	3	0	0
José Corniell	0	1	16.20	1	0	0	1.2	3	4	3	1	1
Codi Heuer	0	0	6.75	1	0	0	1.1	1	1	1	0	1
Totals	81	81	3.49	162	162	37	1443.0	1235	605	560	463	1344

Source:Baseball Reference

== Farm system ==
Level	Team	League	Manager
Triple-A	Round Rock Express	Pacific Coast League	Doug Davis
Double-A	Frisco RoughRiders	Texas League	Carlos Cardoza
High-A	Hub City Spartanburgers	South Atlantic League	Chad Comer
Single-A	Hickory Crawdads	Carolina League	Carlos Maldonado
Rookie	ACL Rangers	Arizona Complex League	Nick Janssen
Foreign Rookie	DSL Rangers 1	Dominican Summer League	Ruben Sosa
Foreign Rookie	DSL Rangers 2	Dominican Summer League	Alexis Infante

== Other events ==
The MLB ran an apparel promotion in March 2025 with "overlap" caps for each team. The caps placed the team's logo over their wordmark (spelled-out team name in the appropriate font and styling). The overlap cap for the Rangers was removed from sale after people noticed that the "T" logo placed in the middle of "Texas" spelled "Tetas", a vulgar Spanish term for "breasts". The cap's monetary value on the secondary market surged as it suddenly became a rare, limited edition collectible.
