= Tiegs =

Tiegs is a surname. Notable people with the surname include:

- Cheryl Tiegs (born 1947), American model and fashion designer
- Jordan Tiegs (born 1987), Canadian baseball player
- Oscar Werner Tiegs (1897–1956), Australian zoologist
- Scott Tiegs (1971–), American ecologist

== See also ==
- Infernus, stage name of Norwegian black metal musician Roger Tiegs (born 1972)
