= Glenn Otto =

American baseball player (born 1996)

- Pitcher
- Born: March 11, 1996 (age 30); Spring, Texas, U.S.
- Batted: Right Threw: Right

MLB debut
- August 27, 2021, for the Texas Rangers

Last MLB appearance
- September 4, 2023, for the Texas Rangers

MLB statistics
- Win–loss record: 7–13
- Earned run average: 5.62
- Strikeouts: 146
- Stats at Baseball Reference

Teams
- Texas Rangers (2021–2023)

Glenn David Otto Jr. (born March 11, 1996) is an American former professional baseball pitcher. He played in Major League Baseball (MLB) for the Texas Rangers.

== Amateur career ==
Otto attended Concordia Lutheran High School in Tomball, Texas. Undrafted out of high school in 2014, he attended Rice University to play college baseball for the Rice Owls. Otto was drafted by the New York Yankees in the fifth round of the 2017 Major League Baseball draft and signed for a $320,000 signing bonus.

== Professional career ==
=== New York Yankees ===
Otto split his professional debut season in 2017 between the Gulf Coast Yankees and Staten Island Yankees, going a combined 3–0 with a 1.35 ERA and 30 strikeouts over 20 innings. He spent the 2018 season with the Charleston RiverDogs, recording a 1–1 record with a 3.48 ERA and 8 strikeouts over 10 1/3 innings pitched. Otto was limited in the 2018 season as he dealt with a blood clot in his shoulder. Otto split 2019 between the GCL Yankees and Tampa Tarpons, compiling a 3–3 record with a 3.23 ERA and 74 strikeouts over 61 1/3 innings. Following the 2019 season, Otto played in the Arizona Fall League for the Surprise Saguaros.

Otto did not play in a game in 2020 due to the cancellation of the minor league season because of the COVID-19 pandemic. He opened 2021 with the Somerset Patriots, going 6–3 with a 3.17 ERA and 103 strikeouts over 65 1/3 innings. After being promoted to the Scranton/Wilkes-Barre RailRiders on July 13, he posted a 1–0 record with a 4.35 ERA and 12 strikeouts over 10 1/3 innings.

=== Texas Rangers ===
On July 29, 2021, Otto, along with Josh Smith, Ezequiel Durán, and Trevor Hauver were traded to the Texas Rangers in exchange for Joey Gallo and Joely Rodríguez. He was assigned to the Round Rock Express of the Triple-A West following the trade, going 2–1 with a 2.70 ERA and 19 strikeouts over 20 innings. On August 27, Texas selected Otto's contract and promoted him to the major leagues to make his MLB debut that night versus the Houston Astros. In his debut, he threw five scoreless innings while recording seven strikeouts. Over six games for Texas in 2021, Otto posted a record of 0–3, a 9.26 ERA, and 28 strikeouts over 23 1/3 innings. After opening the 2022 season with 3 starts for Round Rock, Otto spent the rest of the season with Texas, going 7–10 with a 4.64 ERA and 107 strikeouts over 135 2/3 innings.

Otto opened the 2023 season on the 60-day injured list with a strained oblique. He was activated to make his season debut on June 30, 2023. After struggling to a 10.13 ERA in 6 appearances, Otto was designated for assignment by the Rangers on September 5.

=== San Diego Padres ===
On September 7, 2023, Otto was claimed off waivers by the San Diego Padres. He made 3 starts for the Triple–A El Paso Chihuahuas, logging an 0–2 record and 7.94 ERA with 4 strikeouts across 5 2/3 innings.

Otto began the 2024 season on the injured list with a right teres major muscle strain. He was designated for assignment by the Padres on July 28, 2024, without having appeared for the team. Otto was released by the organization the same day.

=== Houston Astros ===
On August 14, 2024, Otto signed a minor league contract with the Houston Astros. On October 27, Otto re-signed with the Astros on a minor league contract for the 2025 season.

On December 9, 2025, Otto announced his retirement via his Instagram page.
