= Joey Gallo =

American baseball player (born 1993)

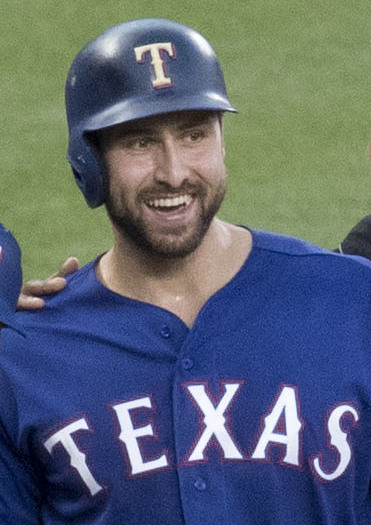
- Gallo with the Texas Rangers in 2017

Free agent
- Outfielder / Infielder
- Born: November 19, 1993 (age 33); Paradise, Nevada, U.S.
- Bats: Left Throws: Right

MLB debut
- June 2, 2015, for the Texas Rangers

MLB statistics (through 2024 season)
- Batting average: .194
- Home runs: 208
- Runs batted in: 453
- Stats at Baseball Reference

Teams
- Texas Rangers (2015–2021); New York Yankees (2021–2022); Los Angeles Dodgers (2022); Minnesota Twins (2023); Washington Nationals (2024)

Career highlights and awards
- 2× All-Star (2019, 2021); 2× Gold Glove Award (2020, 2021)

Joseph Nicholas Gallo (born November 19, 1993) is an American professional baseball outfielder and infielder who is a free agent. He has previously played in Major League Baseball (MLB) for the Texas Rangers, New York Yankees, Los Angeles Dodgers, Minnesota Twins, and Washington Nationals.

The Rangers selected Gallo in the first round of the 2012 MLB draft, and he made his MLB debut with the Rangers in 2015. He was selected to the 2019 and 2021 MLB All-Star Games and won the Gold Glove Award in 2020 and 2021. He currently has the most home runs ever (208) for a player with a career batting average under .200 (.194).

== Early life ==
Gallo attended Bishop Gorman High School in Las Vegas, Nevada. As a senior, he was the Nevada Gatorade Baseball Player of the Year and a High School All-American by MaxPreps, ESPNHS and USA Today. He hit a Nevada high school record 67 career home runs in 446 at bats, and during his senior year of high school he had a .509 batting average with 21 home runs and 80 runs batted in (RBIs) in 114 at bats.

Gallo signed a National Letter of Intent to play college baseball for the LSU Tigers.

== Professional career ==
=== Texas Rangers ===
==== Minor leagues ====
The Texas Rangers selected Gallo in the first round, with the 39th overall selection, in the 2012 Major League Baseball draft. Rather than enroll at LSU, Gallo signed with the Rangers for a $2.25 million signing bonus.

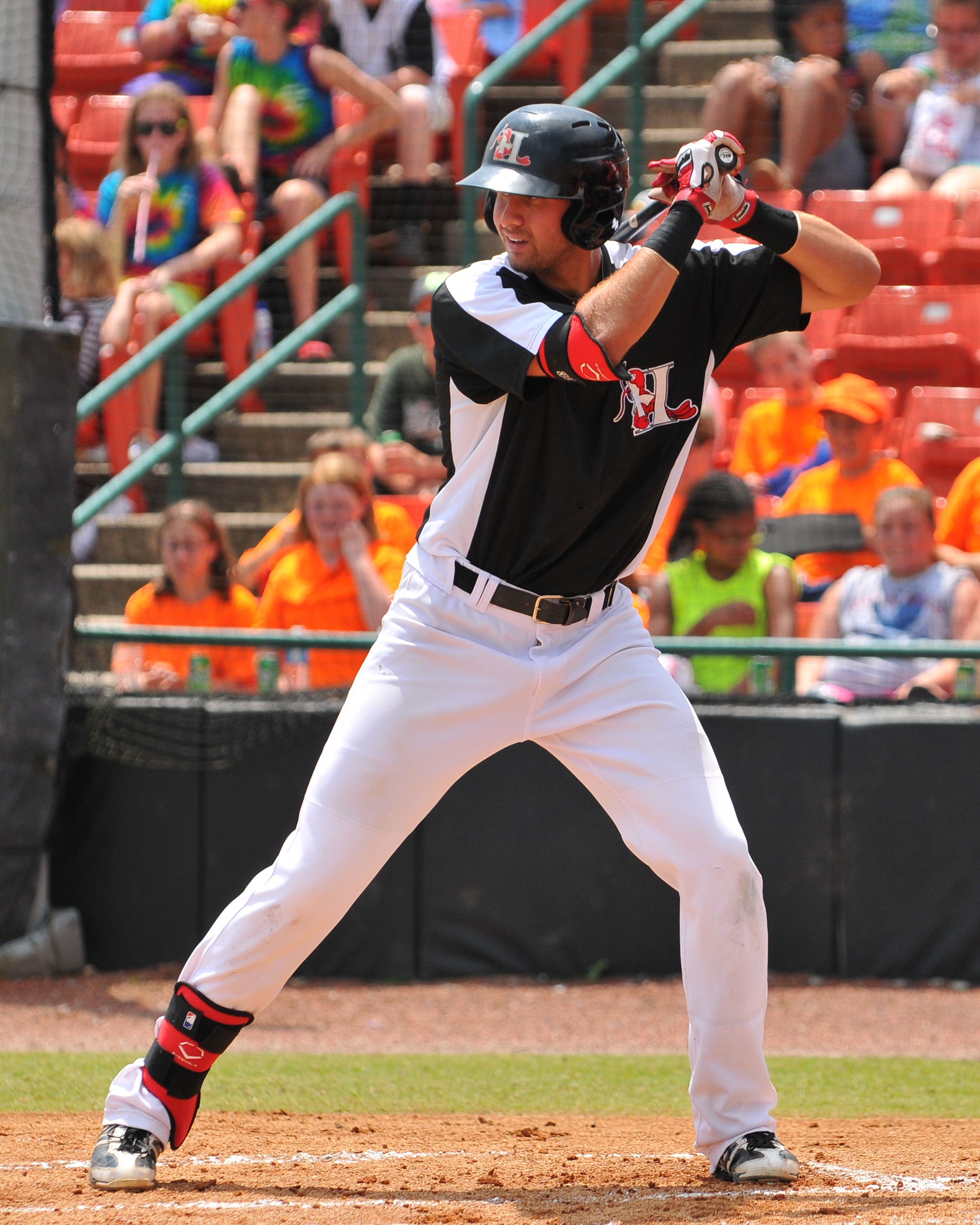
Gallo with the Hickory Crawdads in 2013

Gallo started his professional career with the Arizona League Rangers, where he hit .293/.435/.733 with 18 home runs and 52 runs batted in in 150 at bats over 43 games, and was named a Post-Season AZL All Star, a Topps Short-Season/Rookie All Star, and the Topps AZL Player of the Year. The 18 home runs were an Arizona League record. He was named the Arizona League MVP. He was promoted to the Spokane Indians of the Low-A Northwest League, hitting .214/.343/.464 with four home runs and 26 strikeouts in 56 at-bats in 16 games.

Prior to the 2013 season, Gallo was the Rangers 10th-best prospect according to Baseball America. He played the season with the Hickory Crawdads of the Single-A South Atlantic League, leading the league with 38 home runs and 165 strikeouts in 392 at-bats, and was named a Mid-Season All Star and a Post-Season All Star. He became the first teenager since Dick Simpson in 1962 to hit 40 home runs in a minor league season. Between Hickory and the AZL Rangers, he batted a combined .251/.338/.623 with 40 home runs and 172 strikeouts in 411 at-bats. Gallo won the Joe Bauman Home Run Award for hitting the most home runs in minor league baseball for the 2013 season. Over the offseason, he worked out with Troy Tulowitzki and Jason Giambi at the Philippi Sports Institute in Las Vegas.

Gallo started the 2014 season with the Myrtle Beach Pelicans of the High-A Carolina League, batting .323/.463/.735 and leading the league with 21 home runs as he struck out 64 times in 189 at-bats and was named a Mid-Season All Star and a Post-Season All Star as well as the Carolina League MVP, and was promoted to the Frisco RoughRiders of the Double-A Texas League in June where he was named a Post-Season All Star, a Baseball America High Class A All Star, a Baseball America Minor League All Star, and a Topps Class A All Star. In July, he played in the All-Star Futures Game, where he was named the MVP of the game after hitting a go-ahead home run in the sixth inning. Between the two minor league teams he batted .271/.394/.615 with 42 home runs and 179 strikeouts in 439 at bats. Gallo began the 2015 season with Frisco, and was named a Mid-Season Texas South All Star.

==== Major leagues ====
On June 1, 2015, the Rangers promoted Gallo to the major leagues. On June 2, in his first major league game, Gallo hit a home run and drove in four runs, becoming the first Ranger to achieve four RBIs in an MLB debut game. On June 5, Gallo earned his first MLB Golden Sombrero against the Kansas City Royals. On June 30, 2015, Gallo was optioned to Triple A to make room for Josh Hamilton. In the minors in 2015, he batted .240/.342/.520 with 23 home runs and 139 strikeouts in 321 at bats. In 2015 in the majors, he batted .204/.301/.417 with six home runs and 57 strikeouts in 108 at-bats.

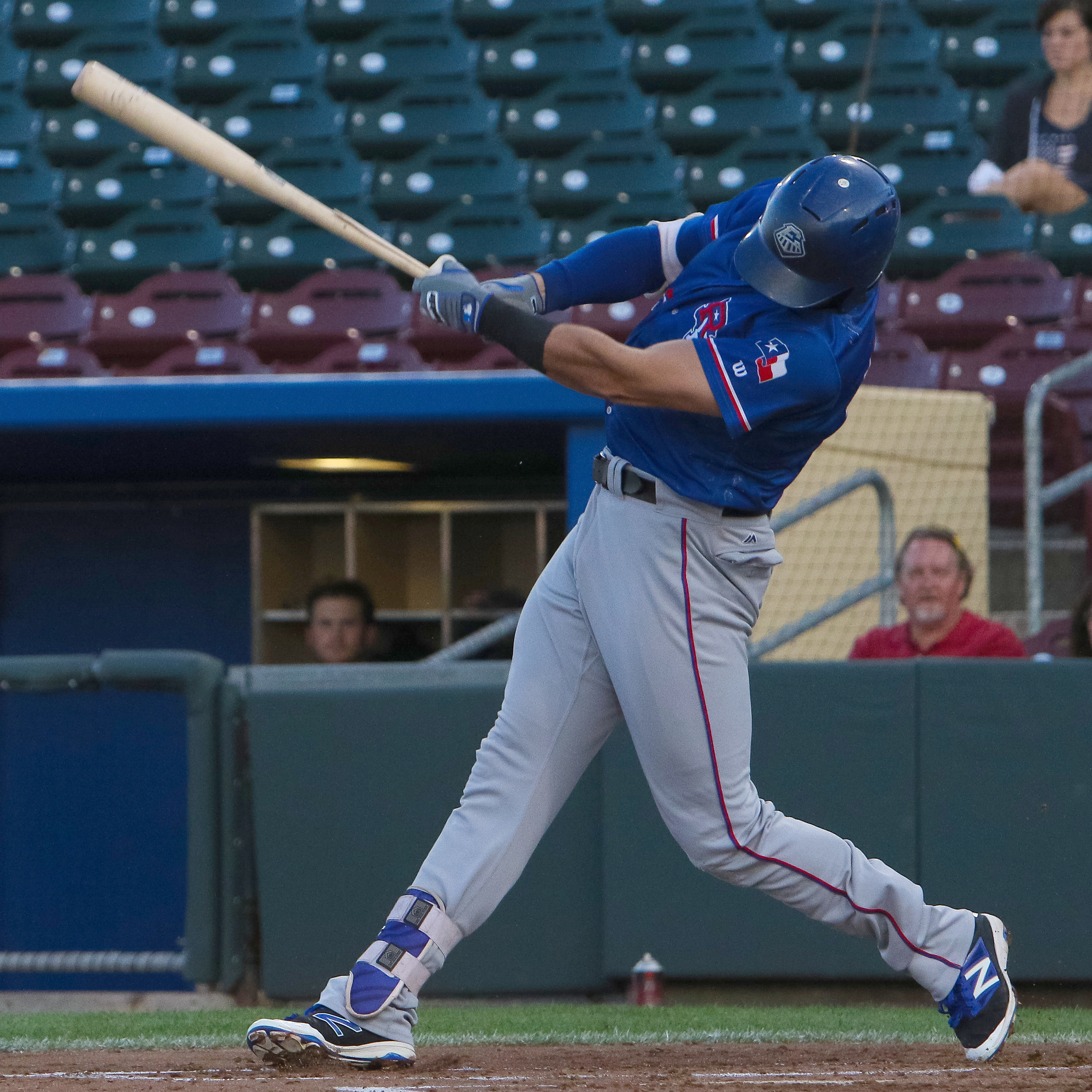
Gallo with the Round Rock Express in 2016

In 2016, Gallo spent the majority of the season in the minors, appearing in only 17 games for the Rangers. In 2016, in 25 at-bats in the majors, he had 19 strikeouts and one hit (a home run). With Round Rock, he batted .240/.367/.529 with 25 home runs and 150 strikeouts in 359 at-bats.

In 2017, Gallo won a major league roster spot out of spring training and played multiple positions all season for the Rangers. For the season, he batted .209/.333/.537 with 196 strikeouts (second in the American League), 41 home runs (third in the league), and 80 RBIs in 449 at bats. He hit the third-longest home run in MLB in 2017, at 490 feet.

In 2018, Gallo batted .206/.312/.498, hit 40 home runs (third in the league), drove in 92 runs, and struck out 207 times in 148 games.

In 2019, Gallo was named the AL Player of the Week for the week of April 15–21 after hitting .478 (11-23) with four home runs and 11 RBI over six games. On May 8, Gallo hit his 100th career home run versus Nick Kingham of the Pirates. He became the fastest player in American League history to reach 100 home runs, doing so in his 377th career game (his record was since surpassed by Gary Sanchez, who reached 100 home runs in 355 games). Gallo also set an MLB record by recording the fewest career singles (93) at the time of reaching the 100 home run mark. On May 31, Gallo hit his first career grand slam off of Danny Duffy of the Kansas City Royals. Gallo was placed on the injured list from June 2 to 25 with a left oblique strain. He was selected as an American League reserve outfielder for the 2019 Major League Baseball All-Star Game, and hit a home run off of Will Smith in his lone All-Star at-bat. Gallo was placed on the injured list and underwent surgery to remove a broken right hamate bone on July 25, ending his season. Gallo finished the 2019 campaign hitting .253/.389/.598/.986 with 22 home runs and 49 RBI over 297 plate appearances in 70 games.

On July 6, 2020, it was announced that Gallo had tested positive for COVID-19, despite being asymptomatic. He hit the first home run at the Rangers' new stadium Globe Life Field on July 26. At the end of the season, Gallo won the AL Gold Glove Award as a right fielder. He finished the shortened season batting .181 with 10 home runs.

On April 9, 2021, Gallo was the only baserunner allowed by Padres starting pitcher Joe Musgrove in his no-hitter against the Rangers, getting hit by a pitch in the fourth inning. Gallo was named to the 2021 MLB All-Star Game, drawing a walk in his only plate appearance. Gallo also participated in the 2021 Home Run Derby.

=== New York Yankees ===
On July 29, 2021, the Rangers traded Gallo and Joely Rodríguez to the New York Yankees in exchange for Josh Smith, Glenn Otto, Trevor Hauver, and Ezequiel Durán.

In 2021, he batted .199/.351/.458 with 38 home runs and 77 RBI. He led the majors in strikeouts with 213 and led the American League in walks with 111. Gallo also won his second consecutive Gold Glove Award.

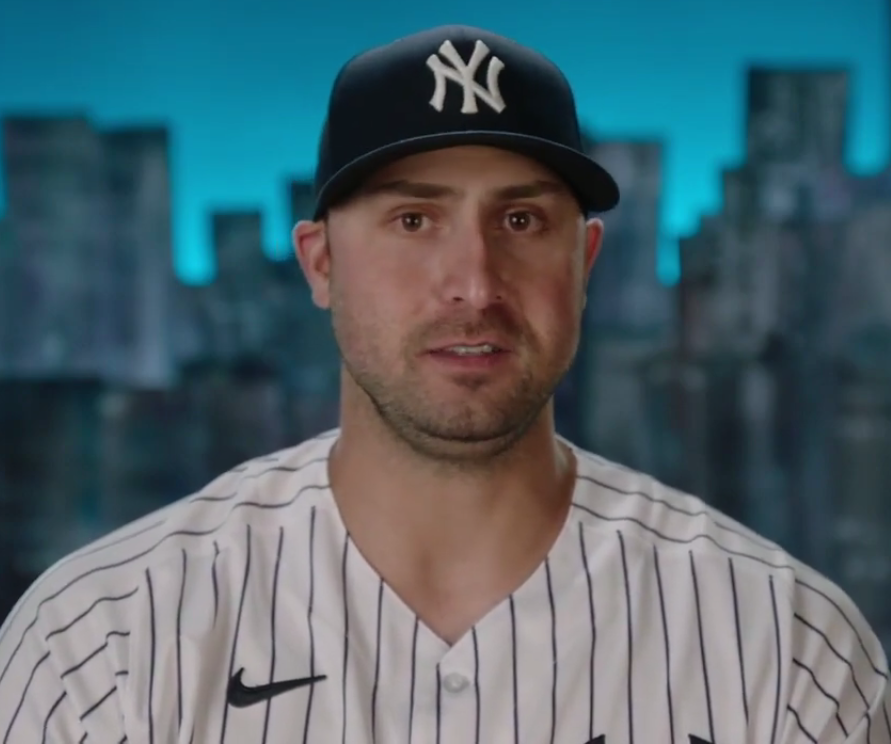
Gallo in March 2022

On March 22, 2022, Gallo signed a $10.275M contract with the Yankees, avoiding arbitration. Gallo's performance dropped off dramatically in 2022, continuing what was described in the New York Post as a "nightmare tenure in The Bronx." He was further described as "one of the biggest trade busts in Yankees history." Shortly before being traded away from the Yankees, Gallo said of his time in New York, "I don't go out in the streets... I really don't want to show my face too much around here... I went through a lot of adversity and I really had to question myself a lot. My confidence suffered. I would say I hit rock bottom for the big leagues." He went on to say that opposing players would try to give him encouragement in the face of boos from fans but that their pity "makes me feel like a piece of s**t, [sic] honestly... it makes me feel like I'm a problem." In 82 games for the Yankees in 2022, he batted a career low .159 with 12 homers and 24 RBIs.

=== Los Angeles Dodgers ===
On August 2, 2022, Gallo was traded to the Los Angeles Dodgers in exchange for Clayton Beeter. He played in 44 games for the Dodgers, hitting .162 with seven home runs and 23 RBI.

=== Minnesota Twins ===
The Minnesota Twins signed Gallo to a one-year, $11 million contract on December 20, 2022. He played in 111 games for the Twins in 2023, batting .177/.301/.440 with 21 home runs and 40 RBI. He became a free agent following the season.

=== Washington Nationals ===
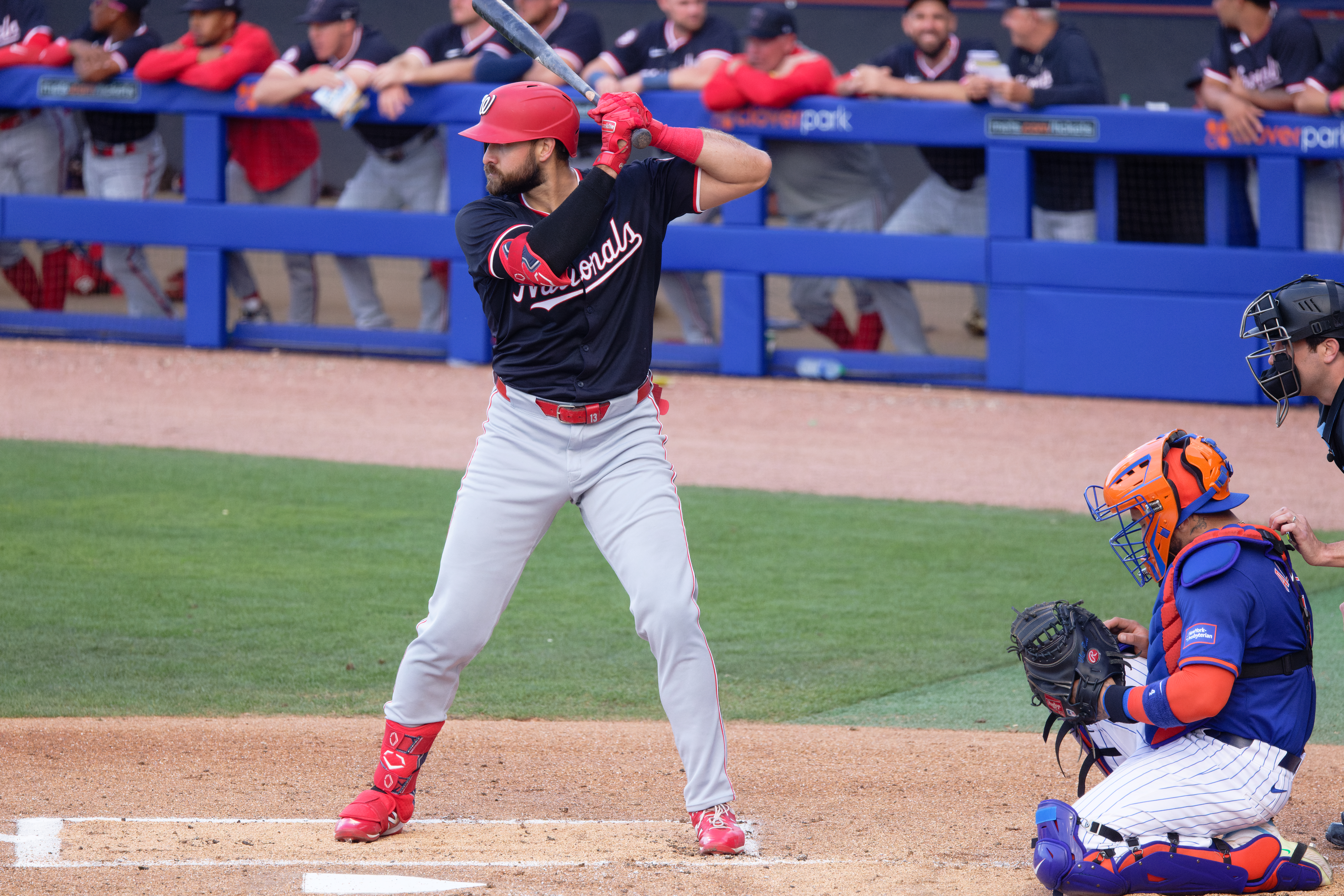
Gallo with the Nationals in 2024

On January 27, 2024, Gallo signed a one-year, $5 million contract with the Washington Nationals. He made 76 appearances for Washington, batting .161/.277/.336 with 10 home runs, 27 RBI, and three stolen bases. On November 3, the Nationals declined the mutual option on Gallo's contract, making him a free agent.

=== Chicago White Sox ===
On February 13, 2025, Gallo signed a minor league contract with the Chicago White Sox. On March 16, Gallo requested and was granted his unconditional release from the organization. Following his release, Gallo announced his intentions to convert into a pitcher.

== Personal life ==
Gallo grew up in Las Vegas and played on youth baseball teams with Bryce Harper and Kris Bryant. Mike Bryant, Kris's father, was one of Gallo's coaches growing up. He is of Italian descent. Gallo's father, Antonio (Tony), is the son of Italian immigrants from Sciacca, Sicily, and was raised in Bensonhurst, Brooklyn.

During the delay of the 2020 Major League Baseball season due to the COVID-19 pandemic, Gallo stayed in his Dallas apartment and set up a batting cage in his living room.
