= Trevor Hauver =

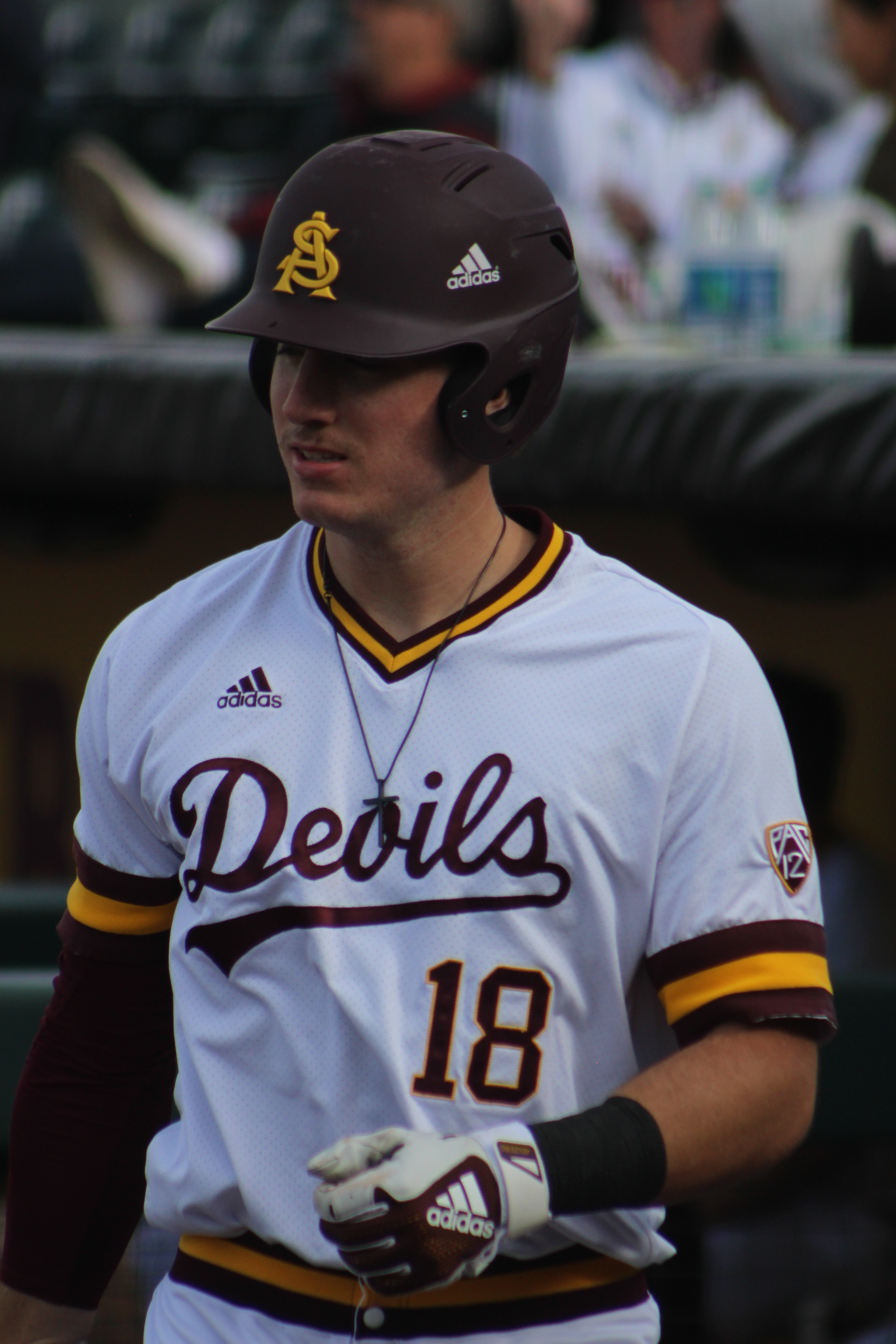
- Hauver with Arizona State in 2019

Free agent
- Outfielder
- Born: November 20, 1998 (age 27); Chandler, Arizona, U.S.
- Bats: Left Throws: Right
- Stats at Baseball Reference

Trevor James Hauver (born November 20, 1998) is an American professional baseball outfielder who is a free agent.

== Amateur career ==
Hauver attended Perry High School in Gilbert, Arizona, where he played shortstop for the baseball team. The Kansas City Royals selected him in the 37th round of the 2017 MLB draft. Hauver did not sign with the Royals, and attended Arizona State University, where he played college baseball for the Arizona State Sun Devils. In 2018 and 2019, he played collegiate summer baseball with the Hyannis Harbor Hawks of the Cape Cod Baseball League.

== Professional career ==
The New York Yankees selected Hauver in the third round, with the 99th overall selection, of the 2020 MLB draft. He did not make his professional debut in 2020 due to the cancellation of the Minor League Baseball season due to the COVID-19 pandemic. He began the 2021 season with the Tampa Tarpons of the Low-A Southeast. He hit six home runs over his first five professional games. He was named the Low-A Southeast Player of the Week for the week of May 4 to 9, and Player of the Month for May.

On July 29, 2021, Hauver along with Josh Smith, Glenn Otto, and Ezequiel Durán were traded to the Texas Rangers in exchange for Joey Gallo and Joely Rodríguez. Hauver was assigned to the Hickory Crawdads of the High-A East following the trade, and hit .246/.357/.426/.783 with six home runs and 21 RBIs over 33 games for them. Hauver split the 2022 season between Hickory and the Frisco RoughRiders of the Double–A Texas League, hitting a combined .220/.387/.427 with 17 home runs and 70 RBI. He played for the Surprise Saguaros of the Arizona Fall League following the 2022 season. Hauver returned to Frisco for the 2023 season, hitting .260/.375/.429/.803 with 12 home runs and 59 RBI.

He elected free agency on November 2, 2026.
