= Joely Rodríguez =

Dominican baseball player (born 1991)

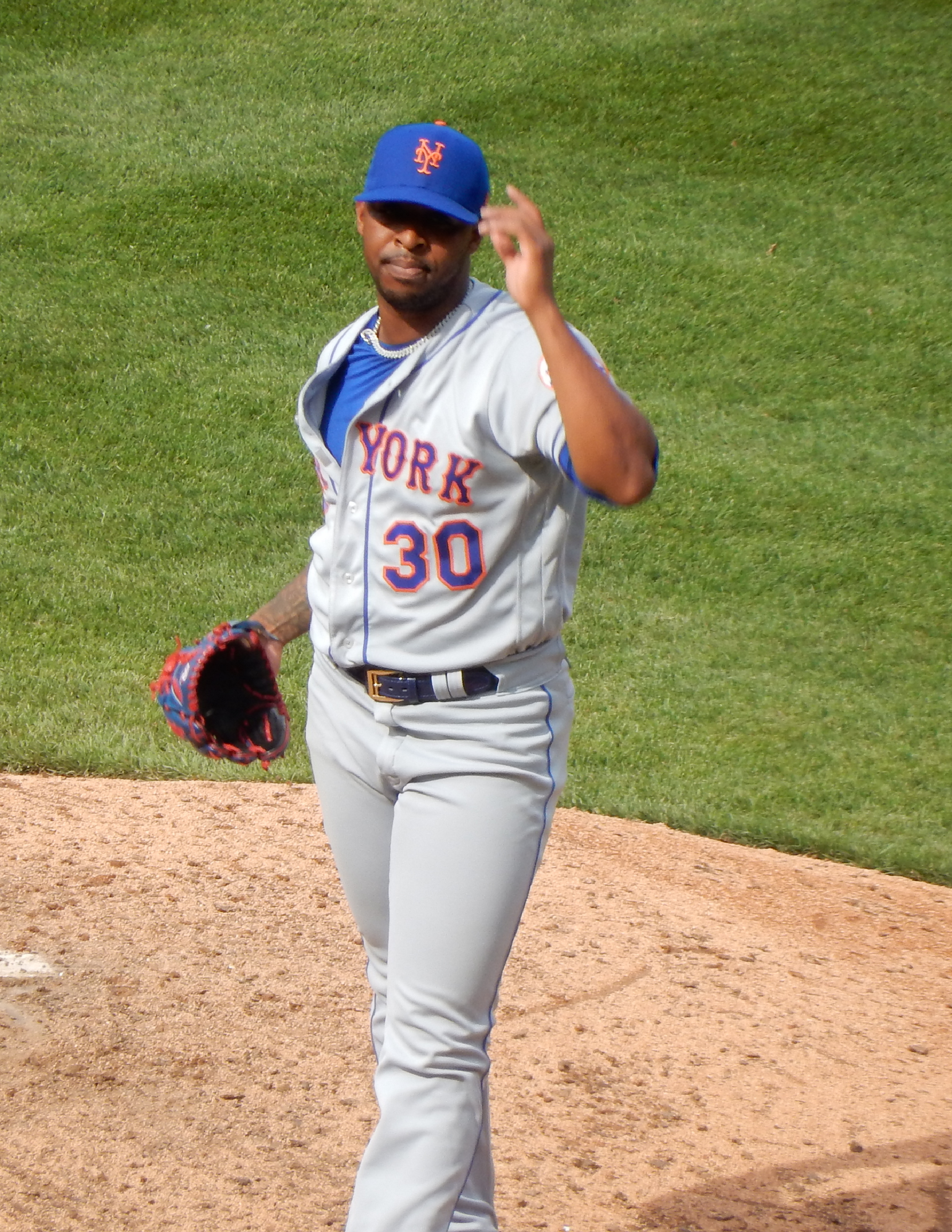
- Rodríguez with the New York Mets in 2022

Free agent
- Pitcher
- Born: November 14, 1991 (age 35); Santo Domingo, Dominican Republic
- Bats: Left Throws: Left

Professional debut
- MLB: September 11, 2016, for the Philadelphia Phillies
- NPB: July 29, 2018, for the Chunichi Dragons

MLB statistics (through 2024 season)
- Win–loss record: 5–10
- Earned run average: 4.80
- Strikeouts: 172

NPB statistics (through 2019 season)
- Win–loss record: 3–7
- Earned run average: 1.85
- Strikeouts: 103
- Stats at Baseball Reference

Teams
- Philadelphia Phillies (2016–2017); Chunichi Dragons (2018–2019); Texas Rangers (2020–2021); New York Yankees (2021); New York Mets (2022); Boston Red Sox (2023–2024)

Career highlights and awards
- MLB: Pitched a combined no-hitter on April 29, 2022; NPB: Central League most valuable setup pitcher (2019)

Joely Rodríguez Sánchez (born November 14, 1991) is a Dominican professional baseball pitcher who is a free agent. He has previously played in Major League Baseball (MLB) for the Philadelphia Phillies, Texas Rangers, New York Yankees, New York Mets, and Boston Red Sox. He has also played in Nippon Professional Baseball (NPB) for the Chunichi Dragons.

== Career ==
=== Pittsburgh Pirates ===
Rodríguez signed with the Pittsburgh Pirates for a $55,000 signing bonus in March 2009. He spent the 2009 season with the DSL Pirates, going 2–5 with a 4.60 ERA over 47 innings.

He split the 2010 season between the GCL Pirates and the State College Spikes, going a combined 2–2 with a 4.21 ERA over 51 1/3 innings. He spent the 2011 season (most of which he missed with an elbow stress reaction and appendicitis) and 2012 season back with State College. He split the 2013 season between the West Virginia Power and the Bradenton Marauders, going a combined 9–8 with a 2.70 ERA over 140 innings. He was added to the team's 40-man roster on November 20, 2013. He spent the 2014 season with the Altoona Curve, going 6–11 with a 4.84 ERA over 134 innings.

=== Philadelphia Phillies ===
On December 10, 2014, the Pirates traded Rodríguez to the Philadelphia Phillies in exchange for Antonio Bastardo. He split the 2015 season between the Reading Fightin Phils and Lehigh Valley IronPigs, going a combined 7–10 with a 6.12 ERA over 129 1/3 innings. He split the 2016 minor league season between the Clearwater Threshers, Reading, and LeHigh Valley, going a combined 7–0 with a 2.35 ERA over 76 2/3 innings. He made his major league debut on September 11, 2016. He produced a 2.79 ERA over 9 2/3 innings for the Phillies in 2016. In 2017, he posted a 1–2 record with a 6.33 ERA over 27 innings for the Phillies.

=== Texas Rangers ===
On June 13, 2017, Rodríguez was traded to the Texas Rangers in exchange for cash considerations or a player to be named later. He spent the remainder of the 2017 season with the Round Rock Express, posting a 2–0 record with a 6.33 ERA over 27 innings.

=== Baltimore Orioles ===
On November 28, 2017, Rodríguez signed a minor league contract with the Baltimore Orioles. He opened the 2018 season with the Norfolk Tides, going 5–2 with a 4.56 ERA over 49 1/3 innings. On July 19, 2018, Rodríguez opted out of his minor league contract, making him a free agent.

=== Chunichi Dragons ===
On July 25, 2018, Rodríguez signed with the Chunichi Dragons of Nippon Professional Baseball on a $270,000 contract. On September 15, 2018, Rodríguez broke the NPB velocity record for a southpaw pitcher throwing down a 159 kilometres per hour (99 mph) pitch against the Hiroshima Carp previously beating the 158 kilometres per hour (98 mph) record set by Yusei Kikuchi in 2016. He produced a 0–3 record with a 2.30 ERA over 27 1/3 innings in 2018.

Rodríguez re-signed with the Dragons for the 2019 season. He posted a 3–4 record with a 1.64 ERA and 77 strikeouts in 60 1/3 innings in 2019. On December 2, 2019, he became free agent.

=== Texas Rangers (second stint) ===
Rodríguez signed a two-year contract, with a team option, with the Texas Rangers on December 16, 2019. In his first season with Texas, he registered an ERA of 2.13 in 12 games.

In 2021 he was 1–3 with a 5.93 ERA. On June 23, 2021, he did pick up his first major league save in a 5-3 Rangers victory over the A's.

=== New York Yankees ===
On July 29, 2021, the Rangers traded Rodríguez and Joey Gallo to the New York Yankees for Josh Smith, Glenn Otto, Trevor Hauver, and Ezequiel Duran. He pitched to a 1–0 record and a 2.84 ERA in 21 appearances for the Yankees. In total in the 2021 season, he was 2–3 with a 4.66 ERA. After the 2021 season, the Yankees declined his $3 million option for the 2022 season, but signed him to a contract for $2 million.

=== New York Mets ===
On April 3, 2022, the Yankees traded Rodríguez to the New York Mets for Miguel Castro. On April 29, 2022, Rodríguez pitched one inning in relief in a combined no-hitter against the Philadelphia Phillies. He ranked in the 95th percentile for average exit velocity, 95th percentile for barrel percentage, and 94th percentile for chase rate in 2022. He was 2–4 with a 4.47 ERA.

=== Boston Red Sox ===
On November 23, 2022, the Boston Red Sox signed Rodríguez to a one-year contract with a club option for the 2024 season. He began the 2023 season on the injured list with a right oblique strain, and was activated on May 15. Rodríguez spent a month on the injured list with left shoulder inflammation, from early June until being activated on July 8. On July 31, he was again placed on the injured list, due to right hip inflammation; in mid-August, Red Sox manager Alex Cora said Rodríguez could miss the remainder of the season, which ultimately was the case. Overall, Rodríguez was limited to 11 innings with the Red Sox, allowing nine runs (eight earned) while striking out 14 batters—the Red Sox declined his 2024 option in early November, making him a free agent.

On February 22, 2024, Rodríguez re-signed with the Red Sox on a minor league contract. On March 22, Rodríguez triggered the opt–out clause in his contract, giving Boston 48 hours to add him to their roster or release him. Two days later, the Red Sox announced that he had made their Opening Day roster. He was the only left-hander on the Red Sox pitching roster. In 11 appearances for Boston, he struggled to a 6.55 ERA with 11 strikeouts across 11 innings pitched. Rodríguez was designated for assignment by Boston following the promotion of Naoyuki Uwasawa on April 28. He cleared waivers and was sent outright to the Triple–A Worcester Red Sox on May 2. On August 23, the Red Sox selected Rodríguez's contract, adding him back to their active roster. After three appearances, he was designated for assignment a second time on August 26. Rodríguez elected free agency on August 29.

=== York Revolution ===
On April 2, 2026, Rodríguez signed with the York Revolution of the Atlantic League of Professional Baseball. He made 27 appearances for the Revolution, compiling a 1–4 record and 5.68 ERA with 28 strikeouts across four saves across 25 1/3 innings pitched. Rodríguez was released by York on July 29.

Awards and achievements
Preceded by Corbin Burnes; Josh Hader	No-hitter pitcher April 29, 2022 (with Tylor Megill, Drew Smith, Seth Lugo & Edwin Díaz)	Succeeded by Reid Detmers
