= José Corniell =

Dominican baseball player (born 2003)

Texas Rangers – No. 59
- Pitcher
- Born: June 22, 2003 (age 23); Santo Domingo, Dominican Republic
- Bats: Right Throws: Right

MLB debut
- September 28, 2025, for the Texas Rangers

MLB statistics (through 2026 season)
- Win–loss record: 0–2
- Earned run average: 19.50
- Strikeouts: 5
- Stats at Baseball Reference

Teams
- Texas Rangers (2025–present)

José Armando Corniell (born June 22, 2003) is a Dominican professional baseball pitcher for the Texas Rangers of Major League Baseball (MLB). He made his MLB debut in 2025.

== Career ==
Corniell signed with the Seattle Mariners as an international free agent on July 2, 2019, for a $630,000 signing bonus. He did not play in 2020 due to the cancellation of the Minor League Baseball season because of the COVID-19 pandemic. On December 15, 2020, Corniell and a PTBNL were traded to the Texas Rangers in exchange for Rafael Montero.

Corniell made his professional debut in 2021 with the ACL Rangers of the Rookie-level Arizona Complex League, going 1–3 with a 6.98 ERA and 44 strikeouts over 38 2/3 innings. He spent the 2022 season with the Down East Wood Ducks of the Low-A Carolina League, going 3–5 with a 5.45 ERA and 71 strikeouts over 66 innings. Corniell opened the 2023 season back with Down East, going 4–1 with a 2.70 ERA and 27 strikeouts over 26 1/3 innings. He was promoted to the Hickory Crawdads of the High-A South Atlantic League on June 20. Over 58 1/3 innings for Hickory, Corniell went 4–2 with a 3.09 ERA and 63 strikeouts. He was named the Texas Rangers 2023 Nolan Ryan Pitcher of the Year.

On November 14, 2023, Texas added Corniell to the 40-man roster to protect him from the Rule 5 draft. He was optioned to the Double–A Frisco RoughRiders to begin the 2024 season, but did not make an appearance for the affiliate due to injury. On June 19, 2024, it was announced that Corniell would be undergoing season–ending surgery to repair the ulnar collateral ligament in his throwing elbow. He returned to game action in 2025, splitting time between the ACL Rangers, the Frisco RoughRiders, and the Round Rock Express, going a combined 1–2 with a 1.89 ERA and 41 strikeouts over 38 innings.

On September 26, 2025, Texas promoted Corniell to the major leagues for the first time.

Corniell was optioned to Triple-A Round Rock to begin the 2026 season. In two appearances for the team, he struggled to an 0–1 record and 20.77 ERA with four strikeouts across 4 1/3 innings pitched. On July 21, 2026, Corniell was placed on the injured list due to an elbow injury. He was transferred to the 60–day injured list on July 29.
