= Jacob Webb =

American baseball player (born 1993)

Chicago Cubs – No. 71
- Pitcher
- Born: August 15, 1993 (age 33); Riverside, California, U.S.
- Bats: Right Throws: Right

MLB debut
- April 16, 2019, for the Atlanta Braves

MLB statistics (through 2026 season)
- Win–loss record: 23–19
- Earned run average: 3.07
- Strikeouts: 317
- Stats at Baseball Reference

Teams
- Atlanta Braves (2019–2021); Los Angeles Angels (2023); Baltimore Orioles (2023–2024); Texas Rangers (2025); Chicago Cubs (2026–present)

Career highlights and awards
- World Series champion (2021)

Jacob Lawrence Webb (born August 15, 1993) is an American professional baseball pitcher for the Chicago Cubs of Major League Baseball (MLB). He has previously played in MLB for the Atlanta Braves, Los Angeles Angels, Baltimore Orioles, and Texas Rangers. He played college baseball at Tabor College and was selected by the Braves in the 18th round of the 2014 MLB draft.

== Career ==
Webb attended Riverside Polytechnic High School in Riverside, California, and played college baseball at Tabor College in Kansas. He was selected by the Atlanta Braves in the 18th round of the 2014 MLB draft.

=== Atlanta Braves ===
Webb made his professional debut in 2014 with the Rookie-level Gulf Coast Braves, going 2–1 with a 2.14 earned run average (ERA) in 33 2/3 innings pitched. He missed the 2015 season after undergoing Tommy John surgery. In 2016, he played for the Rookie Advanced Danville Braves and the Single–A Rome Braves, registering a 4.85 ERA in 12 1/3 innings with no decisions.

Webb split the 2017 season between the High–A Florida Fire Frogs and the Double-A Mississippi Braves, accumulating a 5–2 record with a 2.07 ERA in 65 innings. He split his 2018 season between Mississippi and the Triple-A Gwinnett Stripers, going 3–4 with a 3.15 ERA in 53 innings. The Braves added Webb to their 40-man roster after the 2018 season. During the 2018 offseason, he played for the Estrellas de Oriente of the Dominican Winter League.

Webb opened the 2019 season with the Triple–A Gwinnett Stripers. On April 14, he was added to the major-league roster for the first time. He made his major league debut on April 16, recording one-third of an inning pitched via a strikeout of Ketel Marte. Webb earned his first win and save in a series against the Colorado Rockies. Webb's season ended in August after suffering an elbow impingement. He posted a 4–0 record with a 1.39 ERA over 32 1/3 innings in 2019 for the Braves.

In 2020 he had a 0.00 ERA with no decisions in eight relief appearances over 10 innings. On May 17, 2021, Webb accidentally struck New York Mets outfielder Kevin Pillar in the face with a 94 mph (151 km/h) fastball during the seventh inning, which resulted in Pillar suffering several nasal fractures. For 2021, Webb was 5–4 with a 4.19 ERA in 34 relief appearances over 34 1/3 innings. The Braves finished with an 88–73 record, clinching the National League East division, and went on to win the 2021 World Series, giving the Braves their first title since 1995.

Webb began the 2022 season in spring training, and was sent to Triple A Gwinnett in March. On April 12, 2022, he was designated for assignment by the Braves. Seven days later, he was claimed by the Arizona Diamondbacks.

=== Arizona Diamondbacks ===
On April 19, 2022, Webb was claimed off waivers by the Arizona Diamondbacks. Webb did not make an appearance with the Diamondbacks, spending his entire tenure with Arizona's Triple-A affiliate, the Reno Aces. With Reno, Webb made six relief appearances posting a 10.13 ERA. On June 5, he was designated for assignment by the Diamondbacks.

=== Atlanta Braves (second stint) ===
On June 7, 2022, Webb was traded to the Atlanta Braves in exchange for cash considerations. The Braves designated Webb for assignment on June 16, and sent him to the Gwinnett Stripers on June 19. In 28 appearances for Gwinnett, he logged a 2–3 record and 5.34 ERA with 35 strikeouts and 3 saves across 30 1/3 innings pitched. Webb elected free agency following the season on November 10.

=== Los Angeles Angels ===
On November 24, 2022, Webb signed a minor league contract with the Los Angeles Angels. He was assigned to the Triple-A Salt Lake Bees to begin the 2023 season, where he made 16 appearances and struggled to a 6.75 ERA with 21 strikeouts in 17 1/3 innings pitched. On May 21, Webb's contract was selected to the major league roster. Two days later, he made his first pitching appearance since 2021, throwing a scoreless inning against the Boston Red Sox. In 29 games for the Angels, he registered a 3.98 ERA with 34 strikeouts and 1 save in 31 2/3 innings pitched. On August 5, Webb was designated for assignment following the promotion of Kenny Rosenberg.

=== Baltimore Orioles ===
On August 7, 2023, Webb was claimed off waivers by the Baltimore Orioles. In 25 appearances down the stretch, he recorded a 3.27 ERA with 23 strikeouts over 22 innings of work.

Webb made 60 relief outings for Baltimore in 2024, compiling a 2–5 record and 3.02 ERA with 58 strikeouts across 56 2/3 innings pitched. On November 22, 2024, the Orioles non–tendered Webb, making him a free agent.

=== Texas Rangers ===
On December 11, 2024, Webb signed a one–year, $1.25 million contract with the Texas Rangers. He made 55 appearances for the Rangers in 2025, logging a 5–4 record and 3.00 ERA with 58 strikeouts and one save over 66 innings of work. On November 21, 2025, Webb was non-tendered by Texas and became a free agent.

=== Chicago Cubs ===
On December 23, 2025, Webb signed a one-year, $2.5 million contract with the Chicago Cubs.

During the 2026 season, from June 21 to August 22, Webb had a scoreless streak of 24.2 innings pitched, the longest scoreless inning streak in the MLB at the time.

On November 2, 2026, Webb resigned with the Cubs on a one-year contract worth $2 million with a club option for 2028.
