= Hoby Milner =

American baseball player (born 1991)

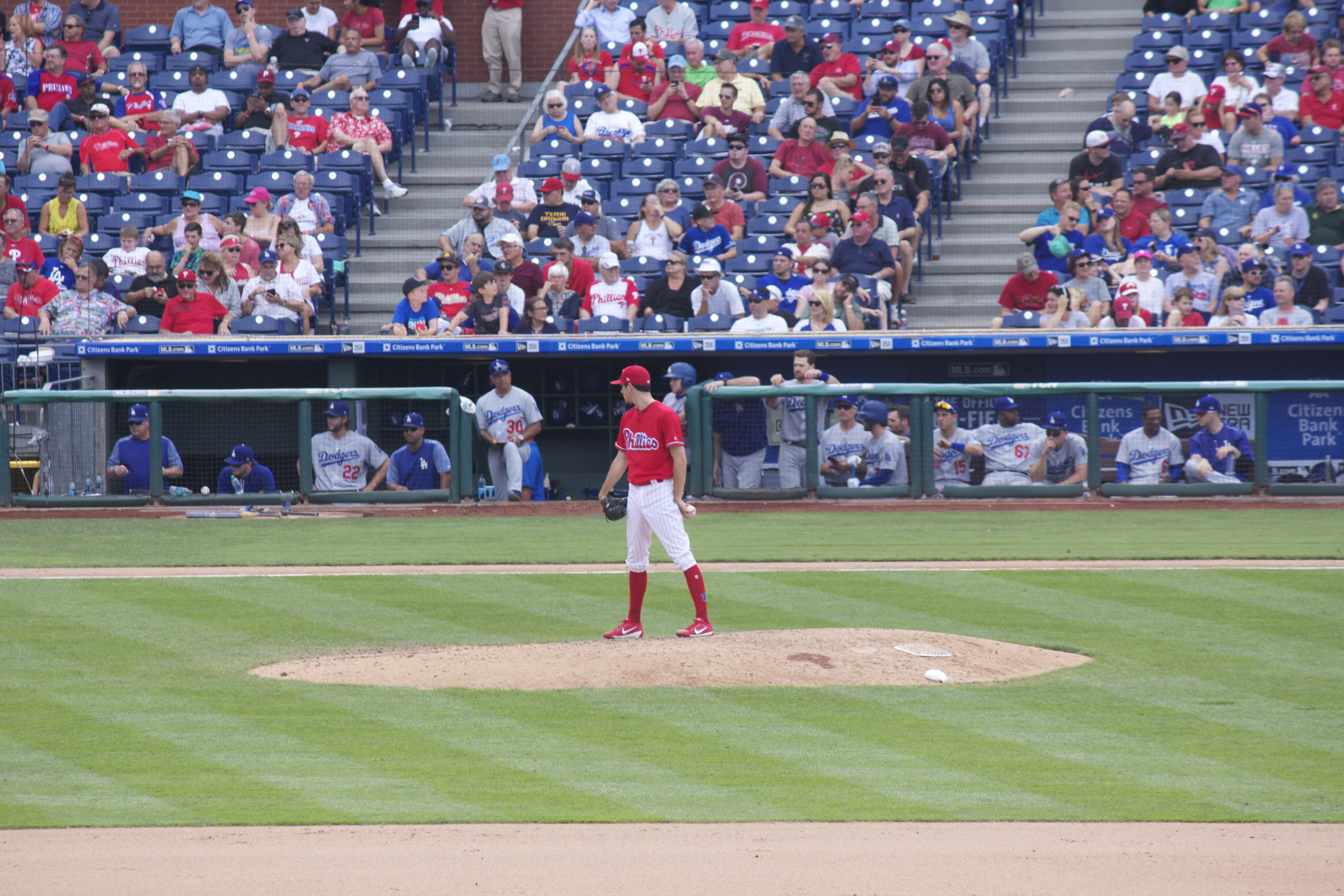
- Milner with the Philadelphia Phillies in 2017

Free agent
- Pitcher
- Born: January 13, 1991 (age 35); Dallas, Texas, U.S.
- Bats: Left Throws: Left

MLB debut
- June 24, 2017, for the Philadelphia Phillies

MLB statistics (through 2026 season)
- Win–loss record: 14–9
- Earned run average: 3.80
- Strikeouts: 346
- Stats at Baseball Reference

Teams
- Philadelphia Phillies (2017–2018); Tampa Bay Rays (2018–2019); Los Angeles Angels (2020); Milwaukee Brewers (2021–2024); Texas Rangers (2025); Chicago Cubs (2026); Seattle Mariners (2026)

Hoby Trey Milner (born January 13, 1991) is an American professional baseball pitcher who is a free agent. He has played in Major League Baseball (MLB) for the Philadelphia Phillies, Tampa Bay Rays, Los Angeles Angels, Milwaukee Brewers, Texas Rangers, Chicago Cubs, and Seattle Mariners. He made his MLB debut in 2017 with the Phillies.

== Career ==
=== Amateur career ===
Milner attended R. L. Paschal High School in Fort Worth, Texas. He also was the punter and kicker on his high school football team. He was drafted by the Washington Nationals in the 44th round of the 2009 Major League Baseball draft. He did not sign and attended the University of Texas, where he played college baseball for the Texas Longhorns.

=== Philadelphia Phillies ===
After his junior year, the Philadelphia Phillies selected Milner in the seventh round of the 2012 MLB draft. He made his professional debut in 2012 with the Low-A Williamsport Crosscutters, and also played for the Single-A Lakewood BlueClaws, accumulating a 7-3 record and 2.50 ERA between the two teams. He spent the 2013 season with the High-A Clearwater Threshers, recording a 12-7 record and 3.83 ERA in 26 games. He spent the 2014 season in Double-A with the Reading Fightin Phils, pitching to a 10-6 record and 4.21 ERA with 86 strikeouts. He split 2015 between Reading and Clearwater, accumulating a 2-1 record and 3.52 ERA in 30 appearances. During the 2015 season, Milner converted from an over the top delivery to a sidearm delivery. In 2016, Milner pitched for the Triple-A Lehigh Valley IronPigs and Reading, recording a 5-4 record and 2.49 ERA in 49 games.

Milner was selected by the Cleveland Indians in the 2016 Rule 5 draft. The Indians returned Milner to the Phillies on March 24, 2017. Milner started 2017 with the Lehigh Valley IronPigs, and was called up to the Phillies on June 20. He made his MLB debut on June 24, pitching 1.0 inning and allowing 1 run against the Arizona Diamondbacks. Milner recorded a stellar 2.01 ERA in 37 appearances in 2017. After struggling to a 7.71 ERA in 10 games in 2018, Milner was designated for assignment on July 8.

=== Tampa Bay Rays ===
On July 14, 2018, the Philadelphia Phillies traded Milner to the Tampa Bay Rays for cash considerations. Milner pitched to a 6.75 ERA in 4 games for the Rays in 2018. He was designated for assignment on November 20.

He opened the 2019 season with the Durham Bulls. On August 20, the Rays selected Milner's contract. Later that day Milner made his season debut going 2 innings allowing 1 run and striking out 1. The next day he was optioned to Triple A Durham to make room for Aaron Slegers who was selected from Triple A Durham. On October 31, 2019, Milner was outrighted off the 40-man roster and elected free agency.

=== Los Angeles Angels ===
On December 9, 2019, Milner signed a minor league deal with the Los Angeles Angels that included an invitation to spring training. His first pitch as an Angel allowed a walkoff grand slam to Matt Olson of the Oakland Athletics on Opening Day 2020. Milner recorded an 8.10 ERA in 19 games in 2020. On December 2, Milner was nontendered by the Angels.

=== Milwaukee Brewers ===
On December 17, 2020, Milner signed a minor league contract with the Milwaukee Brewers. On May 15, 2021, Milner was selected to the active roster. Milner made 19 total appearances for Milwaukee in 2021, logging a 5.40 ERA with 30 strikeouts in 21 2/3 innings pitched.

On April 13, 2022, Milner collected his first career win in a victory over the Baltimore Orioles. Milner pitched in a career-high 67 contests for the Brewers in 2022, logging a 3-3 record and 3.76 ERA with 64 strikeouts in 64.2 innings of work.

On January 12, 2023, Milner agreed to a one-year, $1.025 million contract with the Brewers, avoiding salary arbitration. He made 73 appearances out of the bullpen for Milwaukee, recording a 1.82 ERA with 59 strikeouts over 64 1/3 innings pitched.

Milner made 61 appearances for the Brewers in 2024, compiling a 5–1 record and 4.73 ERA with 64 strikeouts across 64 2/3 innings pitched.

=== Texas Rangers ===
On December 19, 2024, Milner signed a one-year, $2.5 million contract with the Texas Rangers. Milner made 73 appearances for the Rangers during the 2025 season, compiling a 3-4 record and 3.84 ERA with 58 strikeouts across 70 1/3 innings pitched.

=== Chicago Cubs ===
On December 11, 2025, Milner signed a one-year, $3.75 million contract with the Chicago Cubs. He made 38 appearances out of the bullpen for Chicago, compiling a 1–0 record and 3.53 ERA with 18 strikeouts and one save across 35 2/3 innings pitched. On June 27, 2026, Milner went on the injured list due to an appendicitis. During the Cubs' road trip to Milwaukee, he awoke with major stomach pain and took a ride-share to a hospital emergency room. Later that morning, he had surgery. On August 28, Milner was placed on waivers by the Cubs; he was designated for assignment the following day. Milner cleared waivers on August 30, and was subsequently released by Chicago.

=== Seattle Mariners ===
On August 31, 2026, Milner signed a minor league contract with the Seattle Mariners; he was selected to the team's active roster the next day when rosters expanded.

== Personal life ==
Milner is the son of Yvonne Milner and former Blue Jays catcher Brian Milner. His first name was inspired by a character from Baywatch.

He married Kathryn Milner in 2018. They have two children, Leighton and Augustus.

== See also ==
- List of second-generation Major League Baseball players
