= Luis Curvelo =

Venezuelan baseball player (born 2000)

Free agent
- Pitcher
- Born: October 21, 2000 (age 26); Higuerote, Venezuela
- Bats: Right Throws: Right

MLB debut
- July 31, 2025, for the Texas Rangers

MLB statistics (through 2026 season)
- Win–loss record: 1–1
- Earned run average: 7.06
- Strikeouts: 26
- Stats at Baseball Reference

Teams
- Texas Rangers (2025–2026)

Luis Jefferso Curvelo (born October 21, 2000) is a Venezuelan professional baseball pitcher who is a free agent. He made his Major League Baseball (MLB) debut in 2025.

== Career ==
=== Seattle Mariners ===
On May 22, 2018, Curvelo signed with the Seattle Mariners as an international free agent. He made his professional debut with the Dominican Summer League Mariners. Curvelo split the 2019 campaign between the rookie–level Arizona League Mariners and Low–A Everett AquaSox, accumulating a combined 2–2 record and 4.82 ERA with 37 strikeouts across 16 appearances. He did not play in a game in 2020 due to the cancellation of the minor league season because of the COVID-19 pandemic.

Curvelo returned to action in 2021 with the Single–A Modesto Nuts. In 37 appearances out of the bullpen, he compiled a 5–1 record and 3.58 ERA with 80 strikeouts and 6 saves across 55 1/3 innings pitched. Curvelo made 37 appearances for High–A Everett in 2022, posting a 3–2 record and 4.82 ERA with 57 strikeouts over 52 1/3 innings.

Curvelo returned to Everett in 2023, making 41 relief outings and logging a 3–1 record and 3.78 ERA with 60 strikeouts across 52 1/3 innings of work. He spent the 2024 season with the Double–A Arkansas Travelers, compiling a 4–0 record and 2.57 ERA with 78 strikeouts and 3 saves across 66 2/3 innings pitched. Curvelo elected free agency following the season on November 4, 2024.

=== Texas Rangers ===
On November 13, 2024, Curvelo signed a major league contract with the Texas Rangers. He was optioned to the Triple-A Round Rock Express to begin the 2025 season, where he logged a 3-3 record and 3.26 ERA with 40 strikeouts and two saves across 34 appearances. On July 30, 2025, Curvelo was promoted to the major leagues for the first time. On August 2, Curvelo recorded his first career win, tossing 1 1/3 scoreless innings of relief against the Seattle Mariners. He made 17 appearances for the Rangers during his rookie campaign, compiling a 1-1 record and 5.68 ERA with 20 strikeouts over 19 innings of work.

Curvelo was optioned to Triple-A Round Rock to begin the 2026 season. He appeared in nine games for Texas, recording a 9.58 ERA with six strikeouts across 10 1/3 innings pitched. Curvelo was designated for assignment by the Rangers on August 14. He cleared waivers and was sent outright to Triple–A Round Rock on August 17. He elected free agency on November 2.
