= Ezequiel Durán =

Dominican baseball player (born 1999)

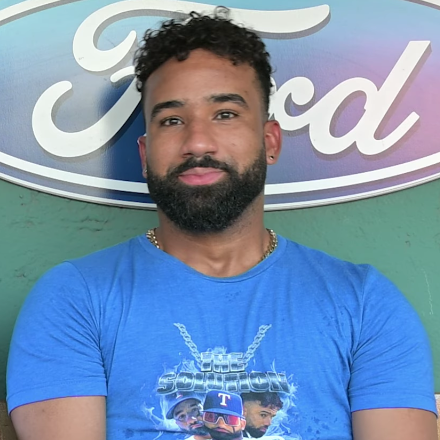
- Durán in 2026

Texas Rangers – No. 20
- Utility player
- Born: May 22, 1999 (age 27); San Juan de la Maguana, Dominican Republic
- Bats: Right Throws: Right

MLB debut
- June 4, 2022, for the Texas Rangers

MLB statistics (through 2026 season)
- Batting average: .254
- Home runs: 39
- Runs batted in: 188
- Stats at Baseball Reference

Teams
- Texas Rangers (2022–present)

Career highlights and awards
- World Series champion (2023); Gold Glove Award (2026)

Ezequiel Alberto Durán (born May 22, 1999) is a Dominican professional baseball utility player for the Texas Rangers of Major League Baseball (MLB). He made his MLB debut in 2022.

== Career ==
=== New York Yankees ===
Durán signed with the New York Yankees as an international free agent on July 2, 2017, for a $10,000 signing bonus. He made his professional debut in 2017 for the DSL Yankees of the Rookie-level Dominican Summer League, hitting .393/.415/.754/1.169 with three home runs and 11 RBI over 15 games.

Durán played for the Pulaski Yankees of the Rookie-level Appalachian League in 2018, hitting .201/.251/.311/.562 with four home runs and 20 RBI. He spent the 2019 season with the Staten Island Yankees of the Class A Short Season New York-Penn League, hitting .256/.329/.496/.824 with 13 home runs, 37 RBI, and 11 stolen bases. Durán did not play in 2020 due to the cancellation of the Minor League Baseball season because of the COVID-19 pandemic. Durán opened the 2021 season with the Hudson Valley Renegades of the High-A East league, hitting .290/.374/.533/.907 with 12 home runs, 48 RBI, and 12 stolen bases over 67 games for them.

=== Texas Rangers ===
On July 29, 2021, Durán along with Josh Smith, Glenn Otto, and Trevor Hauver were traded to the Texas Rangers in exchange for Joey Gallo and Joely Rodríguez. He was assigned to the Hickory Crawdads of the High-A East following the trade, and finished the season posting a .229/.287/.408/.695 slash line with seven home runs and 31 RBI. Durán played in the Arizona Fall League for the Surprise Saguaros following the 2021 season, hitting .278/.333/.611/.944 in 72 at bats with three home runs and 12 RBI. Durán was named to the Fall League All-Star team.

On November 19, 2021, Texas selected Durán its the 40-man roster. He split the 2022 minor league season between the Frisco RoughRiders of the Double-A Texas League and the Round Rock Express of the Triple-A Pacific Coast League, hitting a combined .302/.344/.555/.899 with 16 home runs, 33 doubles, 57 RBI, and 14 stolen bases in 21 attempts over 78 games.

On June 4, Durán was promoted to the major leagues for the first time and made his major league debut that day versus the Seattle Mariners. He recorded his first career hit, an infield single, and first career home run on June 5. Over 58 games for Texas in 2022, Durán hit .236/.277/.365/.643 with 5 home runs, 10 doubles, 4 stolen bases, and 25 RBI, playing primarily second base.

In 2024, with Texas he batted .246/.288/.321 with three home runs and 20 RBI in 92 games, playing primarily third base and outfield.

On March 31, 2025, Durán pitched for the first time in an MLB game in a 14–1 loss to the Cincinnati Reds. He pitched a perfect 8th inning.
