= Josh Smith (infielder) =

American baseball player (born 1997)

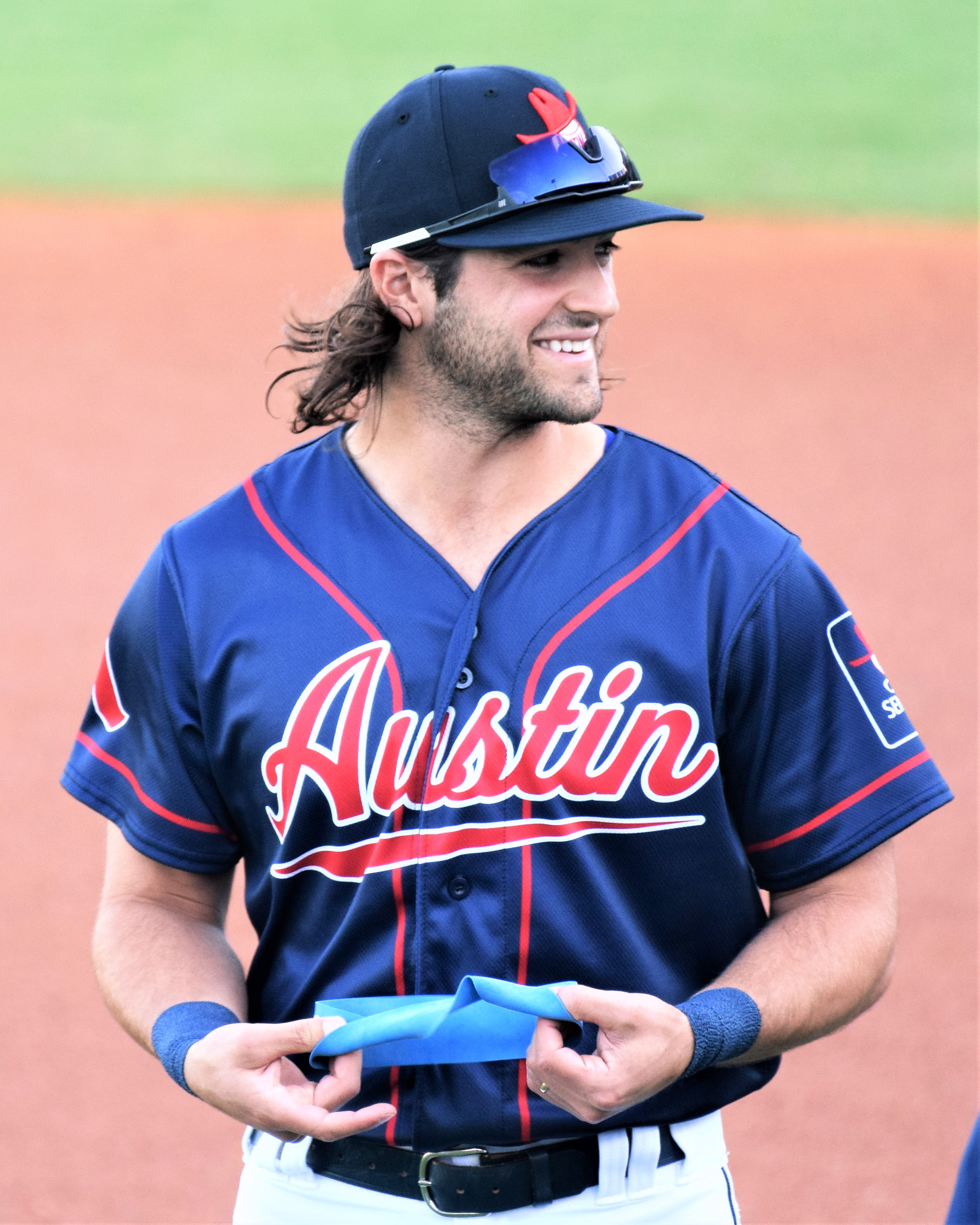
- Smith with the Round Rock Express in 2022

Toronto Blue Jays – No. 9
- Utility player
- Born: August 7, 1997 (age 29); Baton Rouge, Louisiana, U.S.
- Bats: Left Throws: Right

MLB debut
- May 30, 2022, for the Texas Rangers

MLB statistics (through 2026 season)
- Batting average: .232
- Home runs: 37
- Runs batted in: 143
- Stats at Baseball Reference

Teams
- Texas Rangers (2022–2026); Toronto Blue Jays (2026–present)

Career highlights and awards
- World Series champion (2023); Silver Slugger Award (2024)

Joshua Harris Smith (born August 7, 1997) is an American professional baseball utility player for the Toronto Blue Jays of Major League Baseball (MLB). He made his MLB debut in 2022 for the Texas Rangers.

== Amateur career ==
Smith attended Catholic High School in Baton Rouge, Louisiana. He was drafted by the Detroit Tigers in the 38th round of the 2016 MLB draft, but did not sign and attended Louisiana State University (LSU), where he played college baseball for the LSU Tigers. He started for the Tigers as a freshman, hitting .281/.407/.409/.816 with 5 home runs and 48 RBI. Smith played in the Cape Cod League in the summer of 2017 for the Harwich Mariners, hitting .382/.478/.513/.991 with 3 home runs and 12 RBI. Smith missed all but six games of his sophomore year due to a stress reaction in his back. He returned as a starter in his junior year, hitting .346/.433/.533/.966 with 9 home runs and 41 RBI.

== Professional career ==
=== New York Yankees ===
The New York Yankees selected Smith in the second round, with the 67th overall selection, of the 2019 MLB draft. He signed with New York for a $967,700 signing bonus. He played for the Staten Island Yankees following his signing, hitting .324/.450/.477/.927 with three home runs and 15 RBIs over 33 games. He did not play in 2020 due to the cancellation of the Minor League Baseball season due to the COVID-19 pandemic. Smith started the 2021 season with the Tampa Tarpons of Low-A Southeast and was promoted to the Hudson Valley Renegades of High-A East, hitting a combined .324/.448/.641/1.089 with 9 home runs, 24 RBI, and 17 stolen bases.

=== Texas Rangers ===
On July 29, 2021, the Yankees traded Smith, along with Glenn Otto, Ezequiel Durán, and Trevor Hauver, to the Texas Rangers in exchange for Joey Gallo and Joely Rodríguez. He was assigned to the Hickory Crawdads of the High-A East; after nine games with Hickory, the Rangers promoted Smith to the Frisco RoughRiders of the Double-A Central. Smith spent his 2022 season minor league time with the Round Rock Express of the Triple-A Pacific Coast League, hitting .290/.395/.466/.861 6 home runs, 45 RBI, and 9 stolen bases over 55 games.

On May 30, 2022, Texas selected Smith's contract and promoted him to the major leagues for the first time. He made his MLB debut that night versus the Tampa Bay Rays. He recorded his first career hit, a single off Drew Rasmussen, and finished the game with three hits. Smith was placed on the injured list with a sprained left AC joint on June 4. On July 11, 2022, Smith hit an inside-the-park home run against the Oakland Athletics, the first home run of his career. Over 73 games for Texas in 2022, Smith hit .197/.307/.249/.556 with 2 home runs and 16 RBI.

In 2023, Smith hit .185/.304/.328/.663 and won the World Series, though he did not have a plate appearance in the playoffs. In 2024, Smith hit .258/.337/.394/.731, winning the Silver Slugger Award for the utility position.

On June 19, 2026, Smith was optioned to Triple-A Round Rock, marking his first time on optional assignment since the 2022 season.

=== Toronto Blue Jays ===
On August 3, 2026, the Rangers traded Smith and Josh Stephan to the Toronto Blue Jays in exchange for Adam Macko.
