= Justin Viele =

American baseball player & coach (born 1990)

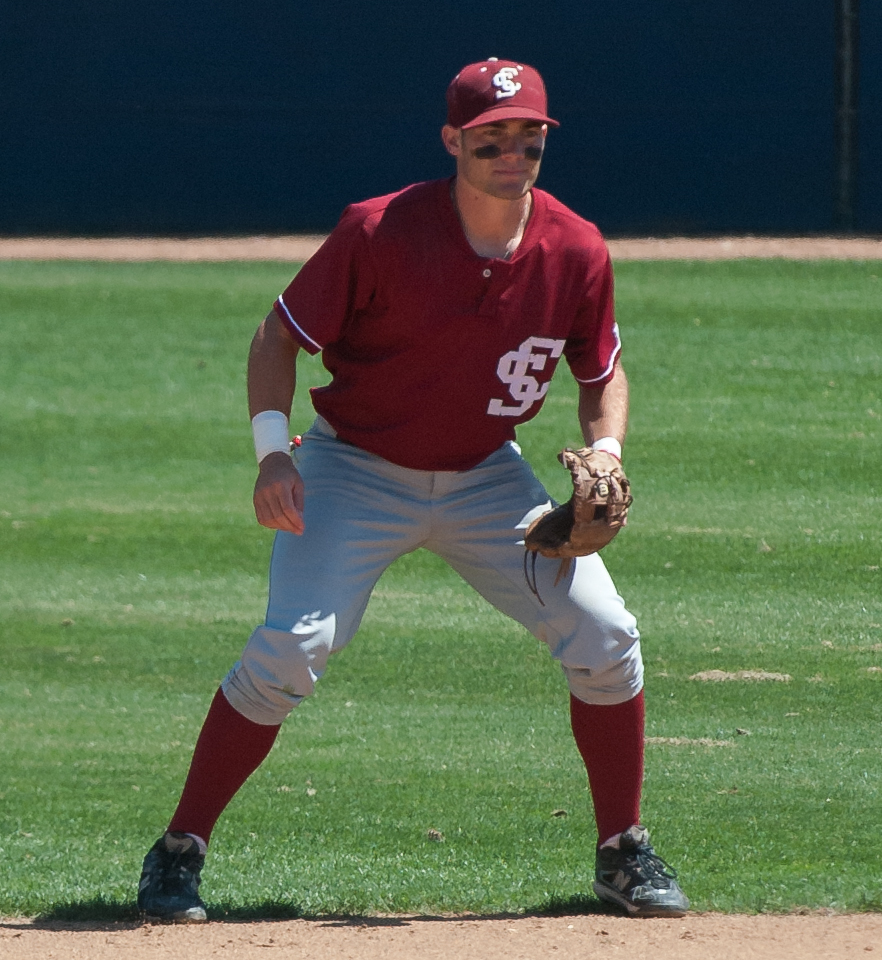
- Viele at Santa Clara in 2010

Texas Rangers – No. 89
- Hitting coach
- Born: November 13, 1990 (age 36); Fullerton, California, U.S.
- Bats: Right Throws: Right

Teams
- As coach: San Francisco Giants (2020–2024); Texas Rangers (2025–present)

Justin Paul Viele (born November 13, 1990) is an American professional baseball hitting coach for the Texas Rangers of Major League Baseball (MLB). He previously coached for the San Francisco Giants. He attended Santa Clara University. Viele was drafted by the Baltimore Orioles in the 37th round of the 2013 MLB draft.

== Playing career ==
=== Amateur ===
Viele attended Esperanza High School in Anaheim, California. Undrafted out of high school, he attended Santa Clara University for four years (2010–2013). Viele graduated from Santa Clara with a Bachelor of Arts in Sociology.

=== Baltimore Orioles ===
Viele was drafted by the Baltimore Orioles in the 37th round, with the 1,119th overall selection, of the 2013 Major League Baseball draft. He split his first professional season between the rookie–level Gulf Coast League Orioles and Low–A Aberdeen IronBirds. Viele played in 74 games for Aberdeen and the Single–A Delmarva Shorebirds in 2014, slashing .164/.275/.198 with no home runs, 23 RBI, and 11 stolen bases. Viele did not play in a game in 2015 due to an injury. He was released by the Orioles organization on September 29, 2015.

== Coaching career ==
Viele began his coaching career in 2015, as an assistant coach for the Frederick Keys in the Baltimore Orioles organization. He returned to Santa Clara University as an assistant coach for the 2015–16 and 2016–2017 seasons. Viele joined the Los Angeles Dodgers organization in 2017, serving as the hitting coach for the rookie–level Ogden Raptors in the Pioneer League. He served as the hitting coach for the Rancho Cucamonga Quakes in the High–A California League in 2018. Viele served as the hitting coach for the Glendale Desert Dogs of the Arizona Fall League in 2018. In 2019, he served as the hitting coach for the Great Lakes Loons in the Single–A Midwest League.

Viele joined the San Francisco Giants as a hitting coach prior to the 2020 season.

Viele was named the hitting coach of the Texas Rangers on November 4, 2024. After splitting duties with Bret Boone during the 2025 campaign, he became the primary hitting coach following Boone's departure from the staff prior to the 2026 season.
