= Robert Garcia (baseball) =

Mexican-American baseball player (born 1996)

Texas Rangers – No. 62
- Pitcher
- Born: June 14, 1996 (age 30); Manteca, California, U.S.
- Bats: Right Throws: Left

MLB debut
- July 14, 2023, for the Miami Marlins

MLB statistics (through 2026 season)
- Win–loss record: 11–17
- Earned run average: 3.46
- Strikeouts: 187
- Stats at Baseball Reference

Teams
- Miami Marlins (2023); Washington Nationals (2023–2024); Texas Rangers (2025–present)

Robert Christopher Garcia (born June 14, 1996) is a Mexican and American professional baseball pitcher for the Texas Rangers of Major League Baseball (MLB). He has previously played in MLB for the Miami Marlins and Washington Nationals. He made his MLB debut in 2023.

== Career ==
=== Amateur ===
Garcia attended Modesto Christian High School in Modesto, California, and lettered in baseball in each of his four years. He attended the University of California, Davis, where he played college baseball for the UC Davis Aggies. In 2016, he played collegiate summer baseball with the Wareham Gatemen of the Cape Cod Baseball League.

On May 8, 2017, Garcia picked up his first career conference player of the week following the series finale against UC Santa Barbara.

=== Kansas City Royals ===
The Kansas City Royals drafted Garcia in the 15th round, with the 450th overall selection, of the 2017 Major League Baseball draft. In 2017 with the rookie–level Arizona League Royals and rookie–level Idaho Falls Chukars, he was a combined 2-5 with a 10.17 ERA in 54 innings in which he gave up 81 hits and a 2.019 WHIP.

Garcia spent the 2018 campaign with Idaho Falls and the Single–A Lexington Legends. In 23 appearances split between the two affiliates, he accumulated a 1.94 ERA with 49 strikeouts and 4 saves across 46 1/3 innings pitched.

In 2019 with the High–A Wilmington Blue Rocks, he was 4–2 with a 4.93 ERA in 35 relief appearances. Garcia did not play in a game in 2020 due to the cancellation of the minor league season because of the COVID-19 pandemic. In the 2021 season, with the Double–A Northwest Arkansas Naturals, he was 4-3 with a 5.63 ERA in 33 games.

=== Miami Marlins ===
On December 8, 2021, the Miami Marlins selected Garcia from the Royals in the minor league phase of the Rule 5 draft. In the 2022 season with the Triple–A Jacksonville Jumbo Shrimp, he was 1-5 with a 4.06 ERA in 44 games. He was assigned to Jacksonville to begin the 2023 season. In 27 games, he recorded a 2.95 ERA with 54 strikeouts and two saves in 36 2/3 innings pitched.

On July 7, 2023, the Marlins promoted Garcia to the major leagues for the first time. He made his major league debut on July 14. For the season for the Marlins, he pitched to three batters in one game, giving up a hit and a walk and getting one out.

=== Washington Nationals ===
On August 1, 2023, Garcia was claimed off waivers by the Washington Nationals. Through the remainder of the 2023 season, he went 2–2 with a 3.69 ERA and 1.14 WHIP to go along with 33 strikeouts and 11 walks across 31^{2}/_{3} innings. Garcia appeared in 72 games for Washington in 2024, posting a 3-6 record and a 4.22 ERA with 75 strikeouts across 59^{2}/_{3} innings pitched.

=== Texas Rangers ===
On December 22, 2024, the Nationals traded Garcia to the Texas Rangers in exchange for Nathaniel Lowe. Garcia made 71 appearances out of the bullpen for Texas during the 2025 season, compiling a 4-8 record and 2.95 ERA with 68 strikeouts and nine saves over 64 innings of work.

On April 23, 2026, Garcia was placed on the injured list due to left shoulder inflammation. He was transferred to the 60-day injured list on June 1. Garcia was activated on September 7.

== International career ==
Garcia is of Mexican descent through his paternal grandparents and holds dual American and Mexican citizenship. He was selected for the Mexico national team for the 2026 World Baseball Classic.

== Personal life ==
Garcia is married to Paige and they have two children. Garcia grew up a fan of the San Francisco Giants.

== See also ==
- Rule 5 draft results
