= Jordan Tiegs =

Canadian baseball coach (born 1987)

Texas Rangers – No. 83
- Coach
- Born: October 16, 1987 (age 38); Woodstock, Ontario, Canada
- Bats: Right Throws: Right

Teams
- Texas Rangers (2025–present)

Jordan Clifford Tiegs (born October 16, 1987) is a Canadian professional baseball former player and current coach who currently serves as the pitching coach for the Texas Rangers of Major League Baseball (MLB).

== Career ==
Tiegs grew up in Woodstock, Ontario and attended Huron Park Secondary School. A pitcher, he was drafted by the Cincinnati Reds in the 46th round of the 2006 Major League Baseball draft, but did not sign. He attended Sauk Valley Community College for two seasons. Tiegs attended the College of Charleston in 2008, before finishing his college career at the University of Indianapolis in 2009. Tiegs only professional playing experience came with the Evansville Otters in 2009.

Tiegs began his coaching career with the University of Indianapolis, spending 2011 through 2014 as their pitching coach and recruiting coordinator. He then spent the 2015 through 2019 collegiate seasons as the pitching coach for Indiana State. Tiegs joined the Texas Rangers organization in July 2019, serving as the pitching coach for the Arizona League Rangers. He spent the 2021 season as the Hickory Crawdads pitching coach. Tiegs spent the 2022 through 2024 seasons as the Rangers minor league pitching coordinator.

Tiegs received his first major league job, serving as the Texas Rangers bullpen coach in 2025. He was promoted to pitching coach of the Rangers prior to the 2026 season after Colby Suggs was named as the new bullpen coach, under new skipper Skip Schumaker.

== Personal life ==
Tiegs earned a bachelor's degree in communications-public relations with a minor in business administration and an MBA from the University of Indianapolis.
