= 2025 Los Angeles Angels season =

2025 Los Angeles Angels
- League: American League
- Division: West
- Ballpark: Angel Stadium
- City: Anaheim, California
- Record: 72–90 (.444)
- Divisional place: 5th
- Owner: Arte Moreno
- General manager: Perry Minasian
- Manager: Ron Washington (until June 20); Ray Montgomery (from June 20)
- Television: FanDuel Sports Network West; KCOP-TV (12 simulcasts, 1 exclusive)
- Radio: KLAA (AM 830); KSPN (AM 710); Angels Radio Network; Spanish: KWKW (AM 1330)
- Stats: ESPN.com; Baseball Reference

The 2025 Los Angeles Angels season was the 65th season of the Angels franchise in the American League, the 60th in Anaheim, and their 60th season playing their home games at Angel Stadium.

In June, manager Ron Washington stepped away from the club indefinitely to undergone a quadruple bypass to remove blockages from his heart valves; bench coach Ray Montgomery took over as interim manager. The team was 36-38 when Washington began his leave, but finished this season with a 72–90 record with Montgomery. It was their tenth consecutive losing season, extending a franchise record. They also missed the postseason for a franchise-record 11th consecutive year, having not made the playoffs since 2014. After the season, it was announced that Washington would not return as manager for 2026.

On September 20, Mike Trout hit his 400th career home run off Rockies pitcher Jaden Hill in the eighth inning. He became the 59th player to reach this milestone and the second active player to do so, joining Giancarlo Stanton.

The Los Angeles Angels drew an average home attendance of 32,290, the 13th-highest of all MLB teams.

== Spring Training ==
On February 4, 2025, the Angels announced 26 non-roster players invited to 2025 Spring Training. Below are the non-roster invitees for Los Angeles Angels 2025 Spring Training. Players who were added to the team's Opening Day roster are in Bold.

Ryan Johnson, who was drafted in 2024 draft, became the 24th drafted player in MLB history to reach the Major Leagues without playing in the Minor Leagues. This means the Angels had had the first player to reach the Major Leagues from the each year's draft for the fourth straight year, following Chase Silseth ('21), Zach Neto ('22) and Nolan Schanuel ('23).

Los Angeles Angels 2025 Spring Training non-roster invitees

Player	Position	2024 team(s)
**Tim Anderson**	Infielder	Miami Marlins
Connor Brogdon	Pitcher	Los Angeles Dodgers
Chris Cortez	Pitcher	Nothing (college baseball)
Michael Darrell-Hicks	Pitcher	Los Angeles Angels (AA/AAA)
J. D. Davis	Infielder	Baltimore Orioles
Ángel Felipe	Pitcher	Oakland Athletics
José Fermín	Pitcher	Los Angeles Angels (A/A+/AA)
Juan Flores	Catcher	Los Angeles Angels (A/A+)
Cole Fontenelle	Infielder	Los Angeles Angels (AA)
Victor González	Pitcher	New York Yankees
Austin Gordon	Pitcher	Nothing (college baseball)
Denzer Guzmán	Infielder	Los Angeles Angels (A+/AA)
Dakota Hudson	Pitcher	Colorado Rockies
**Ryan Johnson**	Pitcher	Nothing (college baseball)
Carter Kieboom	Infielder	Washington Nationals
George Klassen	Pitcher	Los Angeles Angels (A/AA) / Philadelphia Phillies (A/A+)
Dario Laverde	Catcher	Los Angeles Angels (Rk/A)
David Mershon	Infielder	Los Angeles Angels (AA)
Camden Minacci	Pitcher	Los Angeles Angels (A+/AA)
Christian Moore	Infielder	Los Angeles Angels (A/AA)
Samy Natera Jr.	Pitcher	Los Angeles Angels (A+)
Nelson Rada	Outfielder	Los Angeles Angels (AA)
Alberto Rios	Catcher	Los Angeles Angels (Rk/A+)
Sebastián Rivero	Catcher	Atlanta Braves
Yolmer Sánchez	Infielder	New York Mets
Bryce Teodosio	Outfielder	Los Angeles Angels

== Season standings ==
=== American League West ===
AL West
Team	W	L	Pct.	GB	Home	Road
Seattle Mariners	90	72	.556	—	51‍–‍30	39‍–‍42
Houston Astros	87	75	.537	3	46‍–‍35	41‍–‍40
Texas Rangers	81	81	.500	9	48‍–‍33	33‍–‍48
Athletics	76	86	.469	14	36‍–‍45	40‍–‍41
Los Angeles Angels	72	90	.444	18	39‍–‍42	33‍–‍48

=== American League Wild Card ===
Division leaders
Team	W	L	Pct.
Toronto Blue Jays	94	68	.580
Seattle Mariners	90	72	.556
Cleveland Guardians	88	74	.543

Wild Card teams (Top 3 teams qualify for postseason)
Team	W	L	Pct.	GB
New York Yankees	94	68	.580	+7
Boston Red Sox	89	73	.549	+2
Detroit Tigers	87	75	.537	—
Houston Astros	87	75	.537	—
Kansas City Royals	82	80	.506	5
Texas Rangers	81	81	.500	6
Tampa Bay Rays	77	85	.475	10
Athletics	76	86	.469	11
Baltimore Orioles	75	87	.463	12
Los Angeles Angels	72	90	.444	15
Minnesota Twins	70	92	.432	17
Chicago White Sox	60	102	.370	27

=== Record vs. opponents ===
==== Record vs. American League ====
2025 American League record Source: MLB Standings Grid – 2025
Team	ATH	BAL	BOS	CWS	CLE	DET	HOU	KC	LAA	MIN	NYY	SEA	TB	TEX	TOR	NL
Athletics	—	4–2	3–3	5–1	2–4	4–2	8–5	4–2	4–9	4–3	2–4	6–7	3–3	5–8	2–5	20–28
Baltimore	2–4	—	5–8	6–0	3–4	1–5	3–4	2–4	5–1	0–6	4–9	5–1	7–6	2–4	6–7	24–24
Boston	3–3	8–5	—	4–3	4–2	2–4	4–2	4–2	1–5	3–3	9–4	3–3	10–3	3–4	5–8	26–22
Chicago	1–5	0–6	3–4	—	2–11	5–8	3–3	3–10	3–3	8–5	1–6	1–5	4–2	2–4	3–3	21–27
Cleveland	4–2	4–3	2–4	11–2	—	8–5	4–2	8–5	3–3	9–4	3–3	2–4	5–2	2–4	3–3	20–28
Detroit	2–4	5–1	4–2	8–5	5–8	—	4–2	9–4	5–2	8–5	4–2	2–4	3–3	2–4	3–4	23–25
Houston	5–8	4–3	2–4	3–3	2–4	2–4	—	3–3	8–5	5–1	3-3	5–8	3–4	7–6	4–2	31–17
Kansas City	2–4	4–2	2–4	10–3	5–8	4–9	3–3	—	3–3	7–6	0–6	3–4	3–3	6-1	4–2	26–22
Los Angeles	9–4	1–5	5–1	3–3	3–3	2–5	5–8	3–3	—	2–4	3–4	4–9	3–3	5–8	2–4	22–26
Minnesota	3–4	6–0	3–3	5–8	4–9	5–8	1–5	6–7	4–2	—	2–4	3–4	3–3	3–3	2–4	20–28
New York	4–2	9–4	4–9	6–1	3–3	2–4	3–3	6–0	4–3	4–2	—	5–1	9–4	4–2	5–8	26–22
Seattle	7–6	1–5	3–3	5–1	4–2	4–2	8–5	4–3	9–4	4–3	1–5	—	3–3	10–3	2–4	25–23
Tampa Bay	3–3	6–7	3–10	2–4	2–5	3–3	4–3	3–3	3–3	3–3	4–9	3–3	—	3–3	7–6	28–20
Texas	8–5	4–2	4–3	4–2	4–2	4–2	6–7	1-6	8–5	3–3	2–4	3–10	3–3	—	2–4	25–23
Toronto	5–2	7–6	8–5	3–3	3–3	4–3	2–4	2–4	4–2	4–2	8–5	4–2	6–7	4–2	—	30–18

Updated with the results of all games through September 28, 2025.

==== Record vs. National League ====
2025 American League record vs. National League Source: MLB Standings
Team	AZ	ATL	CHC	CIN	COL	LAD	MIA	MIL	NYM	PHI	PIT	SD	SF	STL	WSH
Athletics	1–2	2–1	0–3	3–0	2–1	1–2	2–1	1–2	1–2	1–2	1–2	1–2	1–5	1–2	2–1
Baltimore	1–2	3–0	1–2	1–2	2–1	2–1	1–2	1–2	2–1	1–2	3–0	3–0	1–2	1–2	1–5
Boston	1–2	3–3	1–2	2–1	3–0	2–1	2–1	0–3	2–1	1–2	1–2	1–2	1–2	3–0	3–0
Chicago	1–2	1–2	1–5	2–1	2–1	0–3	2–1	1–2	1–2	2–1	3–0	1–2	2–1	0–3	2–1
Cleveland	1–2	0–3	0–3	1–5	2–1	1–2	2–1	2–1	3–0	1–2	3–0	0–3	2–1	0–3	2–1
Detroit	3–0	0–3	2–1	1–2	3–0	0–3	1–2	1–2	1–2	1–2	2–4	2–1	3–0	2–1	1–2
Houston	3–0	2–1	2–1	2–1	4–2	3–0	2–1	1–2	2–1	3–0	2–1	2–1	0–3	1–2	2–1
Kansas City	2–1	2–1	2–1	1–2	3–0	1–2	1–2	1–2	1–2	1–2	3–0	1–2	2–1	3–3	2–1
Los Angeles	2–1	2–1	0–3	1–2	1–2	6–0	1–2	0–3	0–3	2–1	1–2	1–2	2–1	2–1	1–2
Minnesota	1–2	0–3	2–1	1–2	1–2	1–2	1–2	2–4	2–1	1–2	2–1	2–1	3–0	0–3	1–2
New York	1–2	2–1	1–2	1–2	2–1	1–2	0–3	3–0	3–3	1–2	2–1	2–1	1–2	3–0	3–0
Seattle	0–3	2–1	2–1	2–1	3–0	0–3	2–1	1–2	1–2	0–3	3–0	5–1	0–3	3–0	1–2
Tampa Bay	2–1	2–1	1–2	0–3	2–1	1–2	3–3	2–1	3–0	0–3	2–1	3–0	2–1	2–1	3–0
Texas	2–4	3–0	1–2	2–1	3–0	1–2	0–3	3–0	2–1	0–3	2–1	1–2	1–2	2–1	2–1
Toronto	2–1	2–1	2–1	2–1	3–0	1–2	2–1	1–2	0–3	2–4	1–2	3–0	3–0	3–0	3–0

Updated with the results of all games through September 28, 2025.

== Roster ==
2025 Los Angeles Angels
Roster
Pitchers: 61,66 Samuel Aldegheri; 35 Ian Anderson; 64 Shaun Anderson; 31 Tyler Anderson; 40 Sam Bachman; 75 Connor Brogdon; 46 Brock Burke; 39 Andrew Chafin; 36 Caden Dana; 61 Michael Darrell-Hicks; 48 Reid Detmers; 39 Jake Eder; 52 Carl Edwards Jr.; 70 Mitch Farris; 68 José Fermín; 49 Carson Fulmer; 66 Luis García; 28 Kyle Hendricks; 74 Kenley Jansen; 32 Ryan Johnson; 44 Ben Joyce; 16 Yusei Kikuchi; 41 Jack Kochanowicz; 57 Garrett McDaniels; 58 Víctor Mederos; 54 Héctor Neris; 57 Sammy Peralta; 65 José Quijada; 63 Chase Silseth; 59 José Soriano; 24 Robert Stephenson; 60 Hunter Strickland; 55 Touki Toussaint; 54 José Ureña; 56 Ryan Zeferjahn	Catchers: 25 Travis d'Arnaud; 14 Logan O'Hoppe; 38 Sebastián Rivero; 35 Chad Wallach; Infielders: 77 Tim Anderson; 21 Logan Davidson; 22 J. D. Davis; 13 Denzer Guzmán; 20 Niko Kavadas; 17 Carter Kieboom; 13 Scott Kingery; 8 Nicky Lopez; 5 Yoán Moncada; 4 Christian Moore; 9 Zach Neto; 10 Kevin Newman; 10 Oswald Peraza; 2 Luis Rengifo; 18 Nolan Schanuel; 21 Chad Stevens; 33 Chris Taylor	Outfielders: 7 Jo Adell; 51 Gustavo Campero; 15 Matthew Lugo; 19 Kyren Paris; 12 Jorge Soler; 22 Bryce Teodosio; 27 Mike Trout; 35 LaMonte Wade Jr.; 3 Taylor Ward	Manager: 81 Ray Montgomery; 37 Ron Washington; Coaches: 91 Mike Ashman (batting practice pitcher); 93 Jason Brown (bullpen catcher); 95 Tim Buss (staff assistant); 84 Barry Enright (pitching); 90 Sal Fasano (assistant pitching); 89 Ryan Goins (infield); 86 Steve Karsay (bullpen); 83 Tim Laker (offensive coordinator); 81 Ray Montgomery (bench); 87 Jerry Narron (catching); 80 Jayson Nix (assistant); 88 Bo Porter (first base); 82 Johnny Washington (hitting); 85 Eric Young Sr. (third base)

== Player stats ==
= Indicates team leader

= Indicates league leader

=== Batting ===
Note: G = Games played; AB = At bats; R = Runs scored; H = Hits; 2B = Doubles; 3B = Triples; HR = Home runs; RBI = Runs batted in; SB = Stolen bases; BB = Walks; AVG = Batting average; SLG = Slugging average

Player	G	AB	R	H	2B	3B	HR	RBI	SB	BB	AVG	SLG
Taylor Ward	157	579	86	132	31	2	36	103	4	75	.228	.475
Jo Adell	152	526	63	124	18	1	37	98	5	33	.236	.485
Zach Neto	128	502	82	129	29	1	26	62	26	33	.257	.474
Luis Rengifo	147	501	55	119	16	3	9	43	10	33	.238	.335
Nolan Schanuel	132	488	64	129	23	1	12	53	5	59	.264	.389
Mike Trout	130	456	73	106	14	1	26	64	2	87	.232	.439
Logan O'Hoppe	119	423	35	90	8	1	19	43	2	24	.213	.371
Jorge Soler	82	279	31	60	12	0	12	34	0	28	.215	.387
Yoán Moncada	84	248	39	58	13	2	12	35	0	32	.234	.448
Travis d'Arnaud	69	213	16	42	13	0	6	21	0	13	.197	.343
Christian Moore	53	162	20	32	5	1	7	16	3	19	.198	.370
Bryce Teodosio	50	138	12	28	7	2	1	7	7	5	.203	.304
Kyren Paris	44	126	20	24	4	1	6	11	7	10	.190	.381
Kevin Newman	56	114	13	23	2	0	2	11	1	1	.202	.272
Oswald Peraza	35	86	6	16	1	0	2	7	6	6	.186	.267
Tim Anderson	31	83	8	17	3	0	0	3	1	3	.205	.241
Chris Taylor	30	78	11	14	5	0	2	10	2	5	.179	.321
Matthew Lugo	31	69	9	16	2	1	4	9	0	0	.232	.464
LaMonte Wade Jr.	30	65	7	11	0	0	1	3	1	6	.169	.215
Gustavo Campero	28	58	9	10	1	0	3	8	4	5	.172	.345
Denzer Guzmán	13	42	4	8	1	0	2	3	0	1	.190	.357
Sebastián Rivero	11	33	4	6	2	0	0	2	1	1	.182	.242
Scott Kingery	19	27	3	4	1	0	0	0	1	2	.148	.185
Logan Davidson	10	22	2	4	1	0	1	2	0	0	.182	.364
Niko Kavadas	10	20	0	2	0	0	0	0	0	3	.100	.100
Chad Stevens	5	13	1	2	0	0	0	0	0	0	.154	.154
J. D. Davis	5	9	0	1	0	0	0	0	0	0	.111	.111
Carter Kieboom	3	8	0	2	0	0	0	1	0	0	.250	.250
Nicky Lopez	4	6	0	0	0	0	0	0	0	0	.000	.000
Chad Wallach	1	0	0	0	0	0	0	0	0	0	.---	.---
Totals	162	5374	673	1209	212	17	226	649	88	484	.225	.397

Source:Baseball Reference

=== Pitching ===
Note: W = Wins; L = Losses; ERA = Earned run average; G = Games pitched; GS = Games started; SV = Saves; IP = Innings pitched; H = Hits allowed; R = Runs allowed; ER = Earned runs allowed; BB = Walks allowed; SO = Strikeouts

Player	W	L	ERA	G	GS	SV	IP	H	R	ER	BB	SO
Yusei Kikuchi	7	11	3.99	33	33	0	178.1	180	87	79	74	174
José Soriano	10	11	4.26	31	31	0	169.0	158	89	80	78	152
Kyle Hendricks	8	10	4.76	31	31	0	164.2	167	92	87	43	114
Tyler Anderson	2	8	4.56	26	26	0	136.1	135	73	69	57	104
Jack Kochanowicz	3	11	6.81	23	23	0	111.0	136	89	84	58	72
Reid Detmers	5	3	3.96	61	0	3	63.2	58	29	28	25	80
Brock Burke	7	1	3.36	69	1	0	61.2	58	24	23	18	52
Kenley Jansen	5	4	2.59	62	0	29	59.0	37	18	17	19	57
Ryan Zeferjahn	6	5	4.74	62	1	2	57.0	49	31	30	35	73
Connor Brogdon	3	2	5.55	43	0	0	47.0	45	31	29	18	49
José Fermín	3	2	4.46	40	0	0	34.1	25	21	17	23	39
Caden Dana	0	4	6.40	7	5	0	32.1	30	24	23	18	33
Carson Fulmer	0	0	5.83	13	0	0	29.1	25	19	19	11	26
Mitch Farris	1	3	6.66	5	5	0	24.1	24	19	18	11	24
Hunter Strickland	1	2	3.27	19	0	1	22.0	17	9	8	10	14
Sam Bachman	2	3	6.20	23	0	0	20.1	22	15	14	10	18
José Ureña	0	0	3.79	6	1	0	19.0	17	9	8	10	14
Jake Eder	0	1	4.91	8	0	0	18.1	15	10	10	9	15
Luis García	0	2	2.00	20	0	2	18.0	16	5	4	8	17
Victor Mederos	0	2	7.41	5	3	0	17.0	18	14	14	12	14
Ryan Johnson	1	1	7.36	14	0	1	14.2	24	15	12	5	16
Héctor Neris	3	0	5.14	21	0	0	14.0	11	9	8	7	19
Andrew Chafin	0	0	1.98	16	0	0	13.2	9	3	3	7	18
Sam Aldegheri	0	2	7.90	4	2	0	13.2	20	14	12	10	12
Shaun Anderson	1	0	10.32	7	0	0	11.1	20	13	13	3	11
Chase Silseth	0	0	1.64	10	0	0	11.0	10	2	2	6	13
Garrett McDaniels	0	0	5.91	10	0	0	10.2	13	8	7	8	6
Sammy Peralta	0	1	7.59	5	0	0	10.2	14	12	9	6	8
Robert Stephenson	2	0	2.70	12	0	0	10.0	7	4	3	3	10
Ian Anderson	0	1	11.57	7	0	0	9.1	17	13	12	7	8
Michael Darrell-Hicks	1	0	9.39	6	0	0	7.2	10	8	8	4	6
Ben Joyce	1	0	6.23	5	0	0	4.1	5	4	3	1	1
Kevin Newman	0	0	6.75	2	0	0	4.0	4	3	3	0	0
Carl Edwards Jr.	0	0	9.00	2	0	0	3.0	4	3	3	1	2
Oswald Peraza	0	0	30.86	2	0	0	2.1	9	8	8	0	0
Scott Kingery	0	0	36.00	1	0	0	2.0	12	8	8	0	1
Touki Toussaint	0	0	9.00	1	0	0	2.0	4	2	2	1	3
Niko Kavadas	0	0	0.00	1	0	0	1.2	3	0	0	1	1
José Quijada	0	0	0.00	2	0	0	1.1	1	0	0	2	3
Logan Davidson	0	0	0.00	1	0	0	1.0	0	0	0	0	1
Nicky Lopez	0	0	0.00	1	0	0	0.1	0	0	0	1	0
Totals	72	90	4.89	162	162	38	1431.1	1429	837	777	620	1280

Source:Baseball Reference

== Opening Day lineup ==
The team opened up the season on the road at Chicago on March 27, losing 8-1.

Order	No.	Player	Pos.
1	3	Taylor Ward	LF
2	18	Nolan Schanuel	1B
3	27	Mike Trout	RF
4	12	Jorge Soler	DH
5	77	Tim Anderson	2B
6	2	Luis Rengifo	3B
7	14	Logan O'Hoppe	C
8	7	Jo Adell	CF
9	10	Kevin Newman	SS
—	16	Yusei Kikuchi	P

=== Angels team leaders ===
As of September 28, 2025

Batting
Batting average	Nolan Schanuel	.264
Home runs	Taylor Ward	36
RBIs	Taylor Ward	103
OBP	Mike Trout	.359
Hits	Taylor Ward	132
Stolen bases	Zach Neto	26
Runs scored	Zach Neto	86
Games played	Taylor Ward	157
Pitching
Wins	Jose Soriano	10
ERA	Yusei Kikuchi	3.99
Strikeouts	Yusei Kikuchi	174
Saves	Kenley Jansen	29
Holds	Ryan Zeferjahn	17
WHIP	Kyle Hendricks	1.28
Innings pitched	Yusei Kikuchi	178.1
Games pitched	Brock Burke	69

== Game log ==
The Angels opened the 2025 season on the road at the White Sox.

Legend
	Angels win
	Angels loss
	All-Star Game
	Postponement
	Eliminated from playoff contention
**Bold**	Angels team member

2025 Game Log: 72–90 (Home: 39–42; Road: 33–48)
March/April: 12–17 (Home: 5–4; Road: 7–13)

#	Date	Opponent	Score	Win	Loss	Save	Attendance	Record	Streak
1	March 27	@ White Sox	1–8	Burke (1–0)	**Kikuchi** (0–1)	—	31,403	0–1	L1
2	March 29	@ White Sox	1–0	**Soriano** (1–0)	Clevinger (0–1)	**Jansen** (1)	20,602	1–1	W1
3	March 30	@ White Sox	3–2	**Joyce** (1–0)	Booser (0–1)	**Jansen** (2)	19,591	2–1	W2
4	March 31	@ Cardinals	5–4 (10)	**Burke** (1–0)	Romero (0–1)	**Johnson** (1)	21,206	3–1	W3
5	April 1	@ Cardinals	9–7 (11)	**Johnson** (1–0)	Roycroft (0–1)	**Zeferjahn** (1)	21,306	4–1	W4
6	April 2	@ Cardinals	5–12	Romero (1–1)	**I. Anderson** (0–1)	—	20,309	4–2	L1
7	April 4	Guardians	6–8	Herrin (1–0)	**Soriano** (1–1)	—	44,749	4–3	L1
8	April 5	Guardians	10–4	**Kochanowicz** (1–0)	Bibee (1–1)	—	41,128	5–3	W1
9	April 6	Guardians	6–2	**Zeferjahn** (1–0)	Ortiz (0–2)	—	41,483	6–3	L2
10	April 8	@ Rays	4–3	**Burke** (2–0)	Fairbanks (1–1)	**Jansen** (3)	10,046	7–3	W1
11	April 9	@ Rays	4–5	Pepiot (1–1)	**Kikuchi** (0–2)	Fairbanks (2)	10,046	7–4	L1
12	April 10	@ Rays	11–1	**Soriano** (2–1)	Littell (0–3)	—	10,046	8–4	W1
13	April 11	@ Astros	3–14	Blanco (1–1)	**Kochanowicz** (1–1)	—	34,459	8–5	L1
14	April 12	@ Astros	4–1	**T. Anderson** (1–0)	Gusto (1–1)	**Jansen** (4)	36,102	9–5	W1
15	April 13	@ Astros	3–7	Wesneski (1–1)	**Hendricks** (0–1)	—	37,032	9–6	L1
16	April 15	@ Rangers	0–4	Mahle (3–0)	**Kikuchi** (0–3)	―	24,501	9–7	L2
17	April 16	@ Rangers	1–3	Corbin (1–0)	**Soriano** (2–2)	Jackson (6)	20,535	9–8	L3
18	April 17	@ Rangers	3–5	Rocker (1–2)	**Kochanowicz** (1–2)	Garcia (1)	26,279	9–9	L4
19	April 18	Giants	2–0	**T. Anderson** (2–0)	Webb (2–1)	**Jansen** (5)	43,912	10–9	W1
20	April 19	Giants	2–3	Roupp (2–1)	**Hendricks** (0–2)	Walker (5)	44,374	10–10	L1
21	April 20	Giants	5–4	**Darrell-Hicks** (1–0)	Walker (0–1)	—	36,026	11–10	W1
22	April 22	Pirates	3–9	Shugart (1–0)	**Soriano** (2–3)	—	30,439	11–11	L1
23	April 23	Pirates	0–3	Heaney (2–1)	**Kochanowicz** (1–3)	Santana (3)	31,256	11–12	L2
24	April 24	Pirates	4–3	**Zeferjahn** (2–0)	Shugart (1–1)	**Jansen** (6)	29,060	12–12	W1
25	April 25	@ Twins	4–11	López (2–1)	**Hendricks** (0–3)	—	14,332	12–13	L1
26	April 26	@ Twins	1–5	Woods Richardson (2–2)	**Kikuchi** (0–4)	—	23,905	12–14	L2
27	April 27	@ Twins	0–5	Ryan (2–2)	**Soriano** (2–4)	—	18,615	12–15	L3
28	April 29	@ Mariners	3–5	Miller (2–3)	**Kochanowicz** (1–4)	Muñoz (11)	18,247	12–16	L4
29	April 30	@ Mariners	3–9	Legumina (2–0)	**Detmers** (0–1)	—	16,229	12–17	L5

May: 14–14 (Home: 5–11; Road: 9–3)

#	Date	Opponent	Score	Win	Loss	Save	Attendance	Record	Streak
30	May 1	Tigers	4–10	Mize (5–1)	**Detmers** (0–2)	—	28,486	12–18	L6
31	May 2	Tigers	1–9	Holton (2–2)	**Jansen** (0–1)	—	29,870	12–19	L7
32	May 3	Tigers	5–2	**Hendricks** (1–3)	Flaherty (1–4)	**Jansen** (7)	31,335	13–19	W1
33	May 4	Tigers	1–13	Olson (4–2)	**Kochanowicz** (1–5)	—	37,554	13–20	L1
34	May 6	Blue Jays	8–3	**Neris** (1–1)	García (0–2)	—	25,867	14–20	W1
35	May 7	Blue Jays	5–4	**Burke** (3–0)	Hoffman (3–1)	—	26,646	15–20	W2
36	May 8	Blue Jays	5–8	Bassitt (3–2)	**Johnson** (1–1)	Green (1)	26,245	15–21	L1
37	May 9	Orioles	1–4	Sugano (4–2)	**Hendricks** (1–4)	Bautista (7)	30,778	15–22	L2
38	May 10	Orioles	5–2	**Kochanowicz** (2–5)	Gibson (0–2)	—	27,975	16–22	W1
39	May 11	Orioles	3–7	Eflin (3–1)	**T. Anderson** (2–1)	—	29,460	16–23	L1
40	May 12	@ Padres	9–5	**Burke** (4–0)	Suárez (0–1)	—	41,419	17–23	W1
41	May 13	@ Padres	4–6	Adam (4–0)	**Jansen** (0–2)	—	43,957	17–24	L1
42	May 14	@ Padres	1–5	Vásquez (3–3)	**Hendricks** (1–5)	—	43,766	17–25	L2
43	May 16	@ Dodgers	6–2	**Kochanowicz** (3–5)	May (1–4)	—	46,273	18–25	W1
44	May 17	@ Dodgers	11–9	**Detmers** (1–2)	Yates (3–2)	**Jansen** (8)	50,084	19–25	W2
45	May 18	@ Dodgers	6–4	**S. Anderson** (1–0)	Banda (3–1)	—	51,997	20–25	W3
46	May 19	@ Athletics	4–3	**Soriano** (3–4)	Ginn (1–2)	**Jansen** (9)	10,519	21–25	W4
47	May 20	@ Athletics	7–5	**Hendricks** (2–5)	Hoglund (1–2)	**Jansen** (10)	10,028	22–25	W5
48	May 21	@ Athletics	10–5	**Neris** (2–1)	Sears (4–4)	—	10,094	23–25	W6
49	May 22	@ Athletics	10–5	**Strickland** (1–0)	Holman (4–1)	—	10,321	24–25	W7
50	May 23	Marlins	7–4	**Kikuchi** (1–4)	Alcántara (2–7)	**Jansen** (11)	28,116	25–25	W8
51	May 24	Marlins	2–6	Henríquez (2–1)	**Soriano** (3–5)	Junk (1)	29,301	25–26	L1
52	May 25	Marlins	0–3	Cabrera (1–1)	**Hendricks** (2–6)	Henríquez (1)	37,074	25–27	L2
53	May 26	Yankees	1–5	Yarbrough (2–0)	**Kochanowicz** (3–6)	—	43,626	25–28	L3
54	May 27	Yankees	2–3	Rodón (7–3)	**T. Anderson** (2–2)	Williams (5)	34,491	25–29	L4
55	May 28	Yankees	0–1	Schmidt (2–1)	**Kikuchi** (1–5)	Leiter Jr. (2)	36,808	25–30	L5
56	May 30	@ Guardians	4–1	**Soriano** (4–5)	Ortiz (2–6)	—	31,407	26–30	W1
57	May 31	@ Guardians	5–7	Allen (3–3)	**Zeferjahn** (2–1)	Clase (12)	28,184	26–31	L1

June: 15–11 (Home: 10–5; Road: 5–6)

#	Date	Opponent	Score	Win	Loss	Save	Attendance	Record	Streak
58	June 1	@ Guardians	2–4	Williams (5–3)	**Kochanowicz** (3–7)	Clase (13)	26,518	26–32	L2
59	June 2	@ Red Sox	7–6	**Zeferjahn** (3–1)	Fitts (0–3)	**Jansen** (12)	31,688	27–32	W1
60	June 3	@ Red Sox	4–3 (10)	**Jansen** (1–2)	Kelly (1–2)	**Detmers** (1)	33,003	28–32	W2
61	June 4	@ Red Sox	9–11	Criswell (1–0)	**Burke** (4–1)	—	33,073	28–33	L1
62	June 6	Mariners	5–4	**Hendricks** (3–6)	Miller (2–5)	**Jansen** (13)	34,915	29–33	W1
63	June 7	Mariners	8–6	**Brogdon** (1–0)	Castillo (4–4)	**Jansen** (14)	29,407	30–33	W2
64	June 8	Mariners	2–3	Kirby (1–3)	**T. Anderson** (2–3)	Muñoz (18)	31,416	30–34	L1
65	June 9	Athletics	7–4	**Kikuchi** (2–5)	Springs (5–5)	**Jansen** (15)	24,884	31–34	W1
66	June 10	Athletics	2–1 (10)	**Detmers** (2–2)	Harris (1–1)	—	27,480	32–34	W2
67	June 11	Athletics	6–5	**Hendricks** (4–6)	Holman (4–2)	**Detmers** (2)	21,741	33–34	W3
68	June 13	@ Orioles	0–2	Morton (3–7)	**Kochanowicz** (3–8)	Bautista (13)	20,204	33–35	L1
69	June 14	@ Orioles	5–6	Akin (2–0)	**T. Anderson** (2–4)	Bautista (14)	26,313	33–36	L2
70	June 15	@ Orioles	2–11	Povich (2–5)	**Kikuchi** (2–6)	—	33,370	33–37	L3
71	June 16	@ Yankees	1–0 (11)	**Zeferjahn** (4–1)	Loáisiga (0–1)	**Strickland** (1)	37,398	34–37	W1
72	June 17	@ Yankees	4–0	**Hendricks** (5–6)	Warren (4–4)	—	35,278	35–37	W2
73	June 18	@ Yankees	3–2	**Neris** (3–1)	Cruz (1–3)	**Jansen** (15)	43,255	36–37	W3
74	June 19	@ Yankees	3–7	Rodón (9–5)	**T. Anderson** (2–5)	—	45,671	36–38	L1
75	June 20	Astros	2–3 (10)	Hader (5–1)	**Strickland** (1–1)	Sousa (2)	29,580	36–39	L2
76	June 21	Astros	9–1	**Soriano** (5–5)	Walter (0–1)	—	32,326	37–39	W1
77	June 22	Astros	7–8	Gusto (5–3)	**Strickland** (1–2)	Hader (19)	29,154	37–40	L1
78	June 23	Red Sox	9–5	**Bachman** (1–0)	Whitlock (5–1)	—	30,137	38–40	W1
79	June 24	Red Sox	3–2 (10)	**Detmers** (3–2)	Wilson (2–1)	—	33,115	39–40	W2
80	June 25	Red Sox	5–2	**Kikuchi** (3–6)	Guerrero (0–1)	**Zeferjahn** (2)	28,301	40–40	W3
81	June 27	Nationals	9–15	Lord (2–5)	**Bachman** (1–1)	—	34,289	40–41	L1
82	June 28	Nationals	8–2	**Zeferjahn** (5–1)	Brzykcy (0–1)	—	39,623	41–41	W1
83	June 29	Nationals	4–7 (11)	Finnegan (1–2)	**Brogdon** (1–1)	—	33,661	41–42	L1

July: 12–14 (Home: 8–6; Road: 4–8)

#	Date	Opponent	Score	Win	Loss	Save	Attendance	Record	Streak
84	July 1	@ Braves	4–0	**Fermín** (1–0)	Lee (1–3)	—	31,657	42–42	W1
85	July 2	@ Braves	3–8	Bummer (1–1)	**Zeferjahn** (5–2)	—	31,519	42–43	L1
86	July 3	@ Braves	5–1	**Soriano** (6–5)	Elder (2–6)	—	34,702	43–43	W1
87	July 4	@ Blue Jays	3–4 (10)	Green (3–2)	**Bachman** (1–2)	—	30,119	43–44	L1
88	July 5	@ Blue Jays	3–4 (11)	Fisher (3–0)	**Zeferjahn** (5–3)	—	37,269	43–45	L2
89	July 6	@ Blue Jays	2–3	Burr (1–0)	**T. Anderson** (2–6)	Hoffman (22)	40,114	43–46	L3
90	July 7	Rangers	6–5	**Jansen** (2–2)	Martin (0–5)	—	24,382	44–46	W1
91	July 8	Rangers	1–13	Eovaldi (6–3)	**Soriano** (6–6)	—	26,368	44–47	L1
92	July 9	Rangers	11–8	**Fermín** (2–0)	Jackson (2–5)	**Jansen** (16)	25,462	45–47	W1
93	July 10	Rangers	4–11	Corbin (6–7)	**Kochanowicz** (3–9)	—	27,071	45–48	L1
94	July 11	Diamondbacks	6–5	**Jansen** (3–2)	Backhus (0–1)	—	35,209	46–48	W1
95	July 12	Diamondbacks	10–5	**Kikuchi** (4–6)	Gallen (7–10)	—	43,008	47–48	W2
96	July 13	Diamondbacks	1–5	Kelly (8–5)	**Soriano** (6–7)	—	28,773	47–49	L1
ASG	July 15	AL @ NL	–			—		–	
97	July 18	@ Phillies	6–5	**Bachman** (2–2)	Banks (2–2)	**Jansen** (17)	44,482	48–49	W1
98	July 19	@ Phillies	5–9	Johnson (1–0)	**Bachman** (2–3)	—	43,124	48–50	L1
99	July 20	@ Phillies	8–2	**Soriano** (7–7)	Suárez (7–4)	—	40,616	49–50	W1
100	July 21	@ Mets	5–7	Raley (1–0)	**Fermín** (2–1)	Díaz (20)	41,442	49–51	L1
101	July 22	@ Mets	2–3	Montas (3–1)	**Hendricks** (5–7)	Stanek (3)	43,055	49–52	L2
102	July 23	@ Mets	3–6	Manaea (1–1)	**Eder** (0–1)	Díaz (21)	41,591	49–53	L3
103	July 24	Mariners	2–4	Evans (4–3)	**Kikuchi** (4–7)	Muñoz (23)	28,532	49–54	L4
104	July 25	Mariners	3–2 (10)	**Zeferjahn** (6–3)	Legumina (4–5)	—	37,821	50–54	W1
105	July 26	Mariners	2–7	Kirby (5–5)	**Fermín** (2–2)	—	40,836	50–55	L1
106	July 27	Mariners	4–1	**Hendricks** (6–7)	Gilbert (3–4)	**Jansen** (18)	27,219	51–55	W1
107	July 28	Rangers	6–4	**Brogdon** (2–1)	deGrom (10–3)	**Jansen** (19)	24,538	52–55	W2
108	July 29	Rangers	8–5	**Detmers** (4–2)	Gray (1–1)	**Jansen** (20)	26,390	53–55	W3
109	July 30	Rangers	3–6	Eovaldi (9–3)	**Soriano** (7–8)	Garcia (9)	27,162	53–56	L1

August: 11–16 (Home: 6–9; Road: 5–7)

#	Date	Opponent	Score	Win	Loss	Save	Attendance	Record	Streak
110	August 1	White Sox	3–6	Leasure (4–6)	**Anderson** (2–7)	Wilson (2)	29,937	53–57	L2
111	August 2	White Sox	0–1	Civale (3–6)	**Hendricks** (6–8)	Leasure (3)	39,161	53–58	L3
112	August 3	White Sox	8–5	**Jansen** (4–2)	Alexander (4–10)	—	30,963	54–58	W1
113	August 4	Rays	5–1	**Kikuchi** (5–7)	Houser (6–2)	—	25,754	55–58	W2
114	August 5	Rays	3–7	Pepiot (7–9)	**Soriano** (7–9)	—	27,018	55–59	L1
115	August 6	Rays	4–5	Cleavinger (1–4)	**Zeferjahn** (6–4)	Fairbanks (19)	22,064	55–60	L2
116	August 8	@ Tigers	5–6	Melton (2–1)	**Detmers** (3–3)	Finnegan (23)	35,290	55–61	L3
117	August 9	@ Tigers	7–4	**Kikuchi** (6–7)	Morton (7–10)	**Jansen** (21)	37,741	56–61	W1
118	August 10	@ Tigers	5–9	Mize (11–4)	**Kochanowicz** (3–10)	—	30,810	56–62	L1
119	August 11	Dodgers	7–4	**Soriano** (8–9)	Yamamoto (10–8)	**Jansen** (22)	44,571	57–62	W1
120	August 12	Dodgers	7–6 (10)	**Brogdon** (3–1)	Casparius (7–5)	—	44,741	58–62	W2
121	August 13	Dodgers	6–5	**Burke** (6–1)	Wrobleski (4–4)	**Jansen** (23)	44,893	59–62	W3
122	August 15	@ Athletics	3–10	Perkins (2–2)	**Kikuchi** (6–8)	—	8,484	59–63	L1
123	August 16	@ Athletics	2–7	Morales (1–0)	**Anderson** (2–8)	Newcomb (1)	10,035	59–64	L2
124	August 17	@ Athletics	11–5 (10)	**Jansen** (5–2)	Kelly (2–2)	—	8,876	60–64	W1
125	August 18	Reds	1–4	Singer (11–9)	**Mederos** (0–1)	Barlow (1)	25,421	60–65	L1
126	August 19	Reds	4–6	Mey (2–0)	**Jansen** (5–3)	Santillan (4)	22,276	60–66	L2
127	August 20	Reds	2–1	**Detmers** (4–3)	Ashcraft (7–5)	**García** (1)	27,083	61–66	W1
128	August 22	Cubs	2–3	Keller (4–1)	**Jansen** (5–4)	Palencia (19)	39,872	61–67	L1
129	August 23	Cubs	1–12	Horton (8–4)	**Mederos** (0–2)	Brown (1)	44,355	61–68	L2
130	August 24	Cubs	3–4	Taillon (9–6)	**Hendricks** (6–9)	Palencia (20)	41,206	61–69	L3
131	August 25	@ Rangers	4–0	**Soriano** (9–9)	deGrom (10–6)	—	22,949	62–69	W1
132	August 26	@ Rangers	3–7	Corbin (7–9)	**Kikuchi** (6–9)	—	28,485	62–70	L1
133	August 27	@ Rangers	3–20	Webb (5–4)	**Kochanowicz** (3–11)	—	22,353	62–71	L2
134	August 29	@ Astros	0–2	De Los Santos (5–3)	**García** (2–1)	Ort (1)	33,841	62–72	L3
135	August 30	@ Astros	4–1	**Fermín** (3–2)	Abreu (3–4)	**Jansen** (24)	38,559	63–72	W1
136	August 31	@ Astros	3–0	**Soriano** (10–9)	Brown (10–7)	**Jansen** (25)	36,811	64–72	W2

September: 8–18 (Home: 5–7; Road: 3–11)

#	Date	Opponent	Score	Win	Loss	Save	Attendance	Record	Streak
137	September 1	@ Astros	3–8	García (1–0)	**Kikuchi** (6–10)	—	33,247	64–73	L1
138	September 2	@ Royals	5–1	**Farris** (1–0)	Lorenzen (5–9)	—	13,685	65–73	W1
139	September 3	@ Royals	4–3	**Stephenson** (1–0)	Erceg (6–4)	**Detmers** (3)	15,924	66–73	W2
140	September 4	@ Royals	3–4	Erceg (7–4)	**Zeferjahn** (6–5)	Estévez (37)	17,352	66–74	L1
141	September 5	Athletics	4–10	Barnett (1–1)	**Soriano** (10–10)	—	30,779	66–75	L2
142	September 6	Athletics	4–17	Ginn (3–6)	**Kikuchi** (6–11)	—	35,816	66–76	L3
143	September 7	Athletics	4–3	**Detmers** (5–3)	Bido (2–5)	**Jansen** (26)	33,053	67–76	W1
144	September 8	Twins	3–12	Woods Richardson (6–4)	**Dana** (0–1)	—	28,824	67–77	L1
145	September 9	Twins	12–2	**Hendricks** (7–9)	Matthews (4–5)	—	29,694	68–77	W1
146	September 10	Twins	4–3	**Stephenson** (2–0)	Sands (3–4)	**Jansen** (27)	20,746	69–77	W2
147	September 11	@ Mariners	6–7 (12)	Castillo (2–2)	**Peralta** (0–1)	—	19,129	69–78	L1
148	September 12	@ Mariners	1–2	Vargas (5–5)	**Brogdon** (3–2)	Muñoz (35)	36,143	69–79	L2
149	September 13	@ Mariners	3–5	Woo (14–7)	**Farris** (1–1)	Brash (4)	38,962	69–80	L3
150	September 14	@ Mariners	2–11	Kirby (9–7)	**Hendricks** (7–10)	—	42,513	69–81	L4
151	September 16	@ Brewers	2–9	Peralta (17–6)	**Dana** (0–2)	—	28,566	69–82	L5
152	September 17	@ Brewers	2–9	Woodruff (7–2)	**Soriano** (10–11)	—	28,493	69–83	L6
153	September 18	@ Brewers	2–5	Ashby (4–2)	**García** (2–2)	Koenig (2)	34,261	69–84	L7
154	September 19	@ Rockies	6–7	Blalock (2–5)	**Farris** (1–2)	Vodnik (9)	47,587	69–85	L8
155	September 20	@ Rockies	3–0	**Hendricks** (8–10)	Márquez (3–15)	**García** (2)	36,407	70–85	W1
156	September 21	@ Rockies	1–3	Freeland (5–16)	**Dana** (0–3)	Vodnik (10)	28,516	70–86	L1
157	September 23	Royals	4–8	Ragans (3–3)	**Aldegheri** (0–1)	—	30,861	70–87	L2
158	September 24	Royals	3–2	**Kikuchi** (7–11)	Kolek (5–7)	**Jansen** (28)	29,266	71–87	W1
159	September 25	Royals	4–9	Lorenzen (7–11)	**Farris** (1–3)	—	35,752	71–88	L1
160	September 26	Astros	4–3	**Burke** (7–1)	King (5–4)	**Jansen** (29)	37,448	72–88	W1
161	September 27	Astros	1–6	France (1–0)	**Dana** (0–4)	—	36,487	72–89	L1
162	September 28	Astros	2–6	Gordon (6–4)	**Aldegheri** (0–2)	—	30,609	72–90	L2

== Farm system ==
Level	Team	League	Manager
AAA	Salt Lake Bees	Pacific Coast League	Keith Johnson
AA	Rocket City Trash Pandas	Southern League	Andy Schatzley
A	Tri-City Dust Devils	Northwest League	Dann Bilardello
A-Advanced	Inland Empire 66ers	California League	Dave Stapleton
Rookie	ACL Angels	Arizona Complex League	Hainley Statia
Rookie	DSL Angels	Dominican Summer League	

All coaches and rosters can be found on each team's website.

=== Major League Baseball draft ===
Below are the Angels' picks from 2025 Major League Baseball draft. Players who reached MLB are in bold.

Los Angeles Angels 2025 Draft Picks

Round	Pick	Name	Age	Position	School	Signing bonus
1	2	Tyler Bremner	21	P	UC Santa Barbara	$7,689,525
2	47	Chase Shores	21	P	LSU	$2,077,200
3	79	Johnny Slawinski	18	P	Lyndon B. Johnson HS (TX)	$2,497,500
SUP-3	105	Nate Snead	21	P	Tennessee	$597,500
4	109	Jake Munroe	21	3B	Louisville	$597,500
5	140	C. J. Gray	18	P	A.L. Brown HS (NC)	$1,247,500
6	169	Luke LaCourse	18	P	Bay City Western HS (MI)	$512,500
7	199	Lucas Mahlstedt	22	P	Clemson	$47,500
8	229	Isaiah Jackson	21	OF	Arizona State	$297,500
9	259	Slate Alford	22	3B	Georgia	$17,500
10	289	Nick Rodriguez	22	2B	Missouri State	$47,500
11	319	Alton Davis II	21	P	Georgia	$397,500
12	349	Talon Haley	19	P	Lewisburg HS (MS)	$897,500
13	379	Xavier Mitchell	18	P	Prestonwood Christian Academy (TX)	$872,500
14	409	TJ Ford	19	OF	Trinity Christian School (GA)	$272,500
15	439	Mikey Cascino	18	P	A3 Academy (FL)	$165,000
16	469	Gage Harrelson	21	OF	Florida State	$150,000
17	499	Cole Raymond	18	P	Avon Old Farms School (CT)	$150,000
18	529	Angelo Smith	21	P	Central Florida	$150,000
19	559	Ivan Tatis	19	SS	Georgia Premier Academy (GA)	$100,000
20	589	Sam Tookoian	22	P	Ole Miss	$50,000

=== Minor League Baseball awards ===
Los Angeles Angels Prospects of the Year by MLB Pipeline

Hitting prospect of the Year: Nelson Rada (for AAA/AA)
Pitching prospect of the Year: Dylan Jordan (for A/Rookie)

Los Angeles Angels 2025 Minor League Player of the Year by Baseball America

Player of the Year: Raudi Rodriguez (for A)

All-Star Futures Game selection

Starting pitcher: George Klassen (for AAA/AA)

Post Season All-Stars selection

AAA: Victor Mederos (Starting pitcher)
AA: Denzer Guzmán (Shortstop)
A+: Ryan Johnson (Starting pitcher)
A: Harold Coll (Third baseman), Raudi Rodriguez (Outfielder), Benny Thompson (Relief pitcher)
Rookie: None
Foreign Rookie: None

Player/Pitcher of the Month selection

AAA: None
AA: Denzer Guzmán (July)
A+: Ryan Nicholson (April), Rio Foster (August)
A: Raudi Rodriguez (April, August), Dylan Jordan (August)
Rookie: None
Foreign Rookie: None

Arizona Fall League selection

Player: Outfielder Raudi Rodriguez (for A), Infielder David Mershon (for AAA/AA), Catcher Juan Flores (for A+)
Pitcher: Ryan Costeiu (for AA/A+), Brandon Dufault (for A/Rookie), Fulton Lockhart (for A/Rookie), Benny Thompson (for A), Najer Victor (for A+/A)

Arizona Fall League Fall Stars Game selection

Outfielder Raudi Rodriguez (Won game's MVP)
Catcher Juan Flores

== See also ==
- Los Angeles Angels
- Angel Stadium

Records
Preceded by 2024	Los Angeles Angels seasons 2025	Succeeded by 2026
