= Caden Dana =

American baseball player (born 2003)

Los Angeles Angels – No. 36
- Pitcher
- Born: December 17, 2003 (age 22); Warwick, New York, U.S.
- Bats: Right Throws: Right

MLB debut
- September 1, 2024, for the Los Angeles Angels

MLB statistics (through 2025 season)
- Win–loss record: 1–6
- Earned run average: 7.17
- Strikeouts: 41
- Stats at Baseball Reference

Teams
- Los Angeles Angels (2024–2025)

Caden Lawrence Dana (born December 17, 2003) is an American professional baseball pitcher for the Los Angeles Angels of Major League Baseball (MLB). The Angels selected him in the 11th round of the 2022 MLB draft.

== Amateur career ==
Dana attended Don Bosco Preparatory High School in Ramsey, New Jersey. In early 2020, Dana committed to play college baseball for the Kentucky Wildcats. He was the New Jersey Gatorade Baseball Player of the Year his senior year in 2022.

== Professional career ==
=== Minor leagues ===
Dana was drafted by the Los Angeles Angels in the 11th round of the 2022 Major League Baseball draft. Dana forewent his commitment to play for the Kentucky Wildcats and signed with the Angels for $1,497,500, a record-high signing bonus for an 11th-round pick. He netted the second-highest bonus in the Angels' 2022 draft class, only behind first-round pick Zach Neto. His brother, Casey, was also drafted by the Angels that year.

On August 8, 2022, the Angels assigned Dana to the Rookie-level Arizona Complex League Angels. On August 9, he made his professional debut, pitching two innings while allowing one hit and no runs against the ACL Diamondbacks Black. On September 7, the Angels promoted Dana to the Single-A Inland Empire 66ers of the California League, where he pitched one game. Between the two teams, Dana finished his partial 2022 season with a 0–0 record, 6.48 ERA, and 8 strikeouts in 8 1/3 innings.

Dana played his first three games of the 2023 season with Inland Empire, compiling a 1–1 record with a 1.20 ERA and 18 strikeouts across 15 innings. On April 25, the Angels promoted him to the High-A Tri-City Dust Devils of the Northwest League. In 11 starts with the team, Dana went 2–4 with a 4.22 ERA and 71 strikeouts across 53 1/3 innings.

In 2024, Dana received a non-roster invitation to the Angels' big-league spring training camp for the first time. His performance at the camp received positive reviews from the media, such as after his two shutout innings against the Chicago White Sox on March 3. The organization promoted him to the Double-A Rocket City Trash Pandas of the Southern League to begin the 2024 regular season. In late June, Dana entered MLB.com's league-wide top 100 prospects list, the only Angels player with the distinction at the time. He later moved up to 91 on the list and received an invitation to pitch in the 2024 All-Star Futures Game. By August, he moved up to 74 on the MLB.com ranking, maintaining his organizational top prospect status with first-round draft pick Christian Moore entering behind him. In 23 starts with Rocket City through late August, Dana posted a 9–7 record with a 2.52 ERA and 147 strikeouts in 135 2/3 innings.

=== Major leagues ===
On August 29, 2024, the Angels promoted Dana to the major leagues. When he debuted on September 1, he was 20 years and 259 days old, making him the youngest person to pitch for the Angels since Francisco Rodríguez in 2002 and the youngest starter since Frank Tanana in 1973. In the game, Dana gave up two runs over six innings with four strikeouts, earning a win against the Seattle Mariners. He became the youngest Angels pitcher to record a win in a debut. In 3 starts during his rookie campaign, Dana struggled to a 1–2 record and 9.58 ERA with 8 strikeouts across 10 1/3 innings pitched.

Dana was optioned to the Triple-A Salt Lake Bees to begin the 2025 season. Dana made seven appearances (including five starts) for Los Angeles, but struggled to an 0–4 record and 6.40 ERA with 33 strikeouts across 32 1/3 innings pitched.

Dana was again optioned to Triple-A Salt Lake to begin the 2026 season.

== Personal life ==
Dana grew up in Montgomery, New York. Both of Dana's older brothers, Casey and Cullen, played minor league baseball. Casey was drafted out of UConn by the Angels just five rounds after Dana in 2022.
