= Seaman High School =

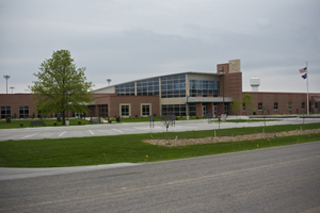
- Seaman High School (2008)

Location
- 4850 NW Rochester Road; Topeka, Kansas 66617; United States; 39.134635°N 95.671787°W

Information
- School type: Public, High School
- Motto: Preparing Today's Students for Tomorrow's World
- Established: 1920
- School district: Seaman USD 345
- CEEB code: 172920
- Principal: Brad Jones
- Teaching staff: 75.50 (FTE)
- Grades: 9–12
- Gender: CoEd
- Enrollment: 1,179 (2023–2024)
- Student to teacher ratio: 15.62
- Colors: Cardinal Red; Royal Blue
- Athletics: Class 5A
- Athletics conference: United Kansas Conference
- Mascot: viking
- Rival: Shawnee Heights High School
- Accreditation: Blue Ribbon 1984.
- Newspaper: The Clipper
- Communities served: Topeka
- Website: School Website

Seaman High School is a public secondary school in Topeka, Kansas, United States. It serves students from grades 9 to 12. It is operated by Seaman USD 345 school district, which covers 84 square miles of northern Topeka and rural Shawnee County, Kansas. The high school is one of the few in the world where the students operate a chartered bank.

== History ==
Seaman High School was founded in 1920, opening to students in grades nine through twelve on October 4 of that year. The school is named for Fred A. Seaman, who was integral in the school's founding and served as its first principal. Seaman High School's initial enrollment was 65 students, who were taught by seven faculty members. Seaman was one of the first three rural high schools in Kansas. Five students were in the first graduating class.

The Seaman Bank, the first high school bank in the United States, was founded in 1927.

In November 1954, Seaman High moved into a new school located one-half mile west of the former school. Enrollment in 1958 was 483 students. Twenty-two teachers were on the faculty. In December 1970, the new high school at 4850 NW Rochester Rd was dedicated. The former structure at 1124 NW Lyman now houses Logan Elementary School. The school was selected as a Blue Ribbon School in 1984. The Blue Ribbon Award recognizes public and private schools which perform at high levels or have made significant academic improvements.

In January 2008, construction was completed of a freshman wing on the current building along with additions to the auditorium and the woods and metal shops. In August 2008, ninth grade, which had previously been moved to the Junior High level, was added back to the school.

In 2017, Seaman High hosted a "community conversation" discussing inappropriate online behavior, harassment, and threats. Students were encouraged to report negative online behavior, and several student groups began to raise awareness around this issue.

In 2018, Seaman High School's swim team became the first swim team in Topeka to win a state championship, since Topeka High School in 1934, winning by 150 points.

In October 2020, research by Seaman High School's student newspaper revealed that Seaman had been a leader within the Ku Klux Klan. The district's board confirmed this and stated that they were "aware of Fred Seaman’s affiliation with the Ku Klux Klan through research conducted by our teachers and students" and are "proud of our teachers and students for taking a strong interest and stance in learning about and identifying historical figures."

On November 8, 2021, the district's board voted unanimously on an "Option C" between the decisions to either change the district name or keep it. This Option C would agree to remove "all references to Fred A. Seaman," including his "image and likeness," throughout the district in an attempt to divorce the community from the founder. However, both the name of the district, the middle school, the high school, district property, and merchandise would keep the name "Seaman," only under the assumption that the word no longer represents the man.

== Extracurricular activities ==
The Vikings are classified as a 5A school, the second-largest classification in Kansas according to the Kansas State High School Activities Association. Throughout its history, Seaman has won several state championships in various sports.

=== Athletics ===
Seaman High School offers the following sports:

==== Fall ====
- Football
- Volleyball
- Boys Cross-Country
- Girls Cross-Country
- Girls Golf
- Boys Soccer
- Girls Tennis
- Cheerleading
- Auxiliary Dance
- Vikettes Dance Team

==== Winter ====
- Boys Basketball
- Girls Basketball
- Boys Wrestling
- Girls Wrestling
- Boys Bowling
- Girls Bowling
- Winter Cheerleading
- Boys Swimming and Diving
- Unified Sports

==== Spring ====
- Baseball
- Boys Golf
- Boys Tennis
- Girls Soccer
- Girls Swimming and Diving
- Softball
- Boys Track and Field
- Girls Track and Field

== Notable alumni ==
- Rick DeHart - former MLB player (Montreal Expos, Kansas City Royals)
- Wes Jackson - founder and current president of The Land Institute
- Ryan Zeferjahn - MLB pitcher (Los Angeles Angels)

== See also ==
- List of high schools in Kansas
- List of unified school districts in Kansas
