= Ray Montgomery (baseball) =

American baseball player (born 1969)

- Outfielder / Coach
- Born: August 8, 1969 (age 57); Bronxville, New York, U.S.
- Batted: Right Threw: Right

MLB debut
- July 3, 1996, for the Houston Astros

Last MLB appearance
- June 16, 1998, for the Houston Astros

MLB statistics
- Batting average: .241
- Runs: 14
- Hits: 21
- Managerial record: 32–50
- Winning %: .390
- Stats at Baseball Reference

Teams
- As player: Houston Astros (1996–1998); As manager: Los Angeles Angels (2025); As coach: Los Angeles Angels (2022–2025)

Raymond James Montgomery (born August 8, 1969) is an American former professional baseball player and executive who most recently served as the interim manager for the Los Angeles Angels of Major League Baseball (MLB). He played in MLB during three seasons for the Houston Astros. He also has formerly served as the scouting director for the Milwaukee Brewers.

== Playing career ==
Montgomery grew up in New York and was a fan of the New York Mets. He attended Archbishop Stepinac High School in White Plains, New York, and Fordham University. In 1989, he played collegiate summer baseball with the Chatham A's of the Cape Cod Baseball League. The Houston Astros selected Montgomery in the 13th round of the 1990 amateur draft. Montgomery played his first professional season with their Class A (Short Season) Auburn Astros in 1990, and his last with the New York Mets' Triple-A Norfolk Tides in 2001.

One of Ray Montgomery's career highlights came on July 24, 1996, against the San Diego Padres when he hit a walk off home run as a pinch hitter in the tenth inning to give the Astros the win, 6-4. The home run, hit off San Diego's Ron Villone, was the first major league home run for the rookie.

== Post-playing career ==
After his playing career, he spent four years as an area scout for the Milwaukee Brewers, during which time Milwaukee selected second baseman Rickie Weeks out of his South Texas/Louisiana territory. He was the Brewers' Midwest supervisor for two years and their assistant scouting director and national supervisor the next two years. In 2009, Montgomery turned down an offer to become the scouting director of the San Diego Padres because he had just moved to Connecticut and did not want to relocate.

In 2010, the Arizona Diamondbacks named Montgomery their new scouting director. He served four years in that role, until he returned to the Brewers as their scouting director in November 2014.

The Los Angeles Angels hired Montgomery as their director for player personnel after the 2020 season. After the 2021 season, the Angels named him their new bench coach.

Montgomery became the Angels' acting manager on June 20, 2025, when manager Ron Washington stepped away from the job due to an undisclosed health concern. On September 30, the Angels announced that neither Montgomery nor Washington would return as the team's manager for the 2026 season.

=== Managerial record ===
As of September 28, 2025

Team	Year	Regular season					Postseason			
Team	Year	Games	Won	Lost	Win %	Finish	Won	Lost	Win %	Result
LAA	2025	82	32	50	.390	5th in AL West	–	–	–	–
Total		82	32	50	.390					

== Personal life ==
Both of Montgomery's parents died of lung cancer. His father died before the 1990 draft and his mother died later that decade.

Montgomery met his wife, Daniela, when they were both students at Fordham and married at Fordham on September 29, 1996. Their first child, a son, was born in late 2000.
