= Kevin Newman (baseball) =

American baseball player (born 1993)

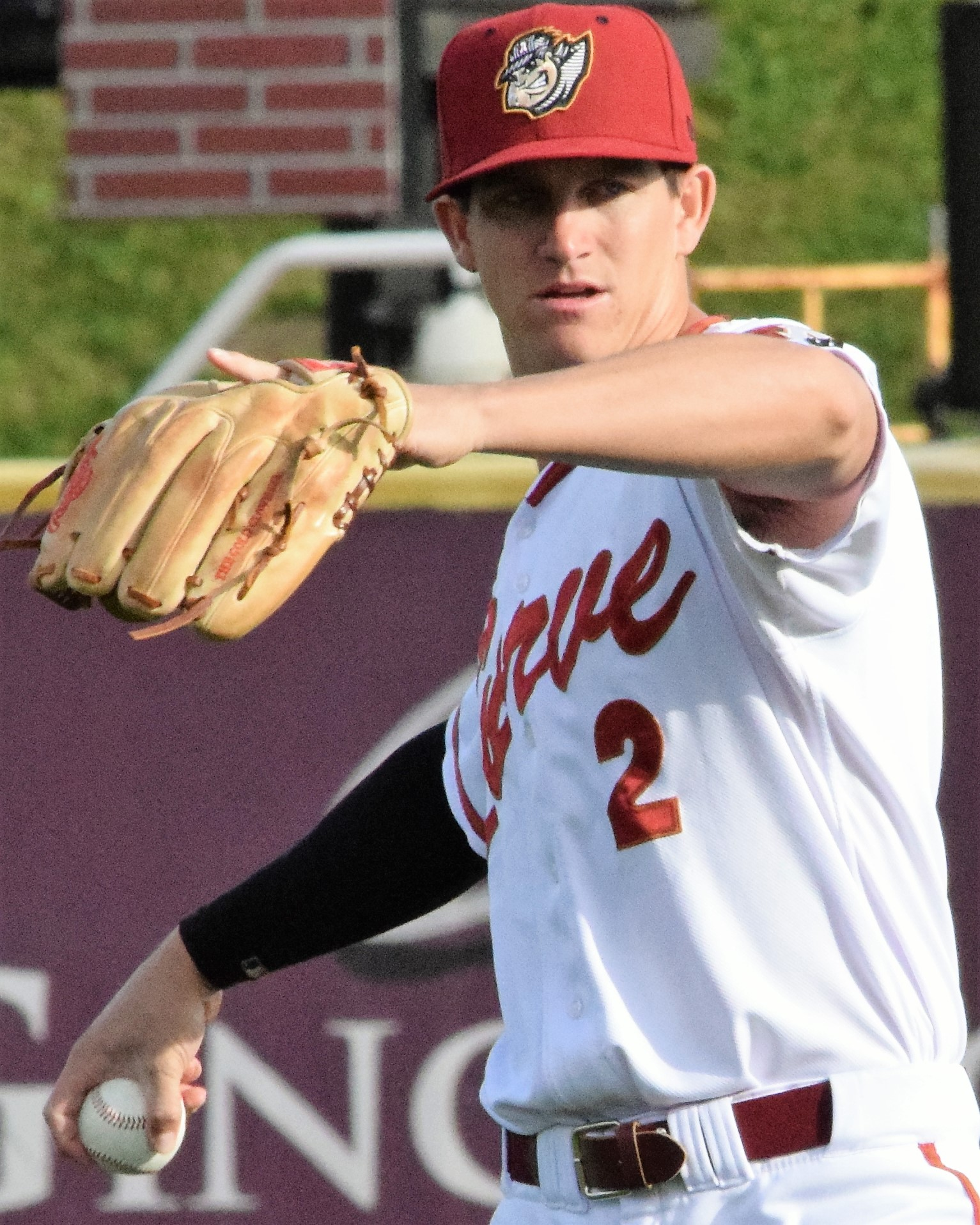
- Newman with the Altoona Curve in 2017

Free agent
- Infielder
- Born: August 4, 1993 (age 33); Poway, California, U.S.
- Bats: Right Throws: Right

MLB debut
- August 16, 2018, for the Pittsburgh Pirates

MLB statistics (through 2025 season)
- Batting average: .259
- Home runs: 28
- Runs batted in: 210
- Stolen bases: 47
- Stats at Baseball Reference

Teams
- Pittsburgh Pirates (2018–2022); Cincinnati Reds (2023); Arizona Diamondbacks (2024); Los Angeles Angels (2025)

Kevin Bradley Newman (born August 4, 1993) is an American professional baseball infielder who is a free agent. He has previously played in Major League Baseball (MLB) for the Pittsburgh Pirates, Cincinnati Reds, Arizona Diamondbacks, and Los Angeles Angels. Newman played college baseball for the Arizona Wildcats of the University of Arizona, before the Pirates selected him in the first round of the 2015 MLB draft.

== Amateur career ==
Newman graduated from Poway High School in Poway, California. He made the school's varsity baseball team in his sophomore year. Newman had a .404 batting average in his junior year, and was pursued by the University of Arizona, University of Oregon, and the University of California, Los Angeles. He committed to attend Arizona on a college baseball scholarship to play for the Arizona Wildcats baseball team.

Newman succeeded Alex Mejia as the Wildcats' starting shortstop as a freshman. In his freshman year, Newman had a .336 batting average, the 11th best in the Pac-12 Conference (Pac-12). He was named to the Freshman All-America team by Louisville Slugger, and was the only freshman named to the All-Pac-12 Conference team. He had a .304 batting average as a sophomore, and was again named to the Pac-12's All-Conference team. He was added to the Golden Spikes Award watch list before his junior year. Newman also played summer collegiate baseball for the Falmouth Commodores of the Cape Cod Baseball League (CCBL) in the summers of 2013 and 2014, winning the league's batting average title in both years, and the league MVP award in 2014. He was named to the CCBL Hall of Fame in 2020. In 2015, Newman was named to the All-Pac-12 Conference team.

== Professional career ==
=== Pittsburgh Pirates ===
The Pittsburgh Pirates selected Newman in the first round, with the 19th overall selection, of the 2015 MLB draft. He signed with the Pirates and reported to the West Virginia Black Bears of the Low-A New York–Penn League to make his professional debut. The Pirates promoted Newman to the West Virginia Power of the Single-A South Atlantic League in August. In 61 combined games between the two teams, he posted a .257 batting average with two home runs, 17 RBIs and 13 stolen bases. He began the 2016 season with the Bradenton Marauders of the High-A Florida State League, and was later promoted to the Altoona Curve of the Double-A Eastern League; in 102 total games, he batted .320 with five home runs and 52 RBIs. In 2017, he played for both Altoona and the Indianapolis Indians of the Triple-A International League, batting a combined .267 with four home runs, 41 RBIs and a .675 OPS in 122 total games.

MLB.com ranked Newman as Pittsburgh's seventh-best prospect going into the 2018 season. He played 102 games for Indianapolis, batting .302, before the Pirates promoted him to the major leagues on August 16.

On April 6, 2019, Newman hit his first walk-off, a single to help the Pirates defeat the Cincinnati Reds 6–5 in 10 innings. In 2019 he batted .308/.353/.446, tied for the National League lead in infield hits (22), and led the NL in at bats per strikeout (8.0).

In 2020 for Pittsburgh, Newman slashed .224/.281/.276 with 1 home run and 10 RBIs. In 2021 he batted .226/.265/.309, and had the lowest OPS in the major leagues, at .574. However, he also led the major leagues in at bats per strikeout (12.6).

In 2021 Newman set the spring training batting average record, minimum 30 plate appearances, batting .606. Also going 39 plate appearances without a strikeout. This .606 average broke the previous record held by Todd Linden (.586 in 2008) for the highest batting average in a Spring Training since official statistics began in 2006.

Newman began the 2022 season on the injured list with a groin injury, and was placed on the 60-day injured list on May 23 after suffering a hamstring-related setback while rehabbing with Triple-A Indianapolis. He was activated on July 8.

=== Cincinnati Reds ===
On November 18, 2022, the Pirates traded Newman to the Cincinnati Reds in exchange for Dauri Moreta. In 74 games for Cincinnati, he batted .253/.311/.364 with 3 home runs, 28 RBI, and 8 stolen bases. On August 19, 2023, Newman was placed on the injured list with a left oblique strain. On September 25, Newman was activated from the injured list and subsequently designated for assignment. He was released by the Reds organization on September 27.

=== Arizona Diamondbacks ===
On January 3, 2024, Newman signed a minor league contract with the Arizona Diamondbacks. On March 27, Newman opted out of his contract and became a free agent. The next day, he re–signed with the Diamondbacks on a new minor league contract. On April 7, Newman was selected to the major league roster following an injury to Geraldo Perdomo. He made 111 appearances for the Diamondbacks, batting .278/.311/.375 with three home runs, 28 RBI, and eight stolen bases.

=== Los Angeles Angels ===
On November 14, 2024, Newman signed a one-year, $2.5 million with the Los Angeles Angels. In 56 appearances for the Los Angeles, he batted .202/.209/.272 with two home runs, 11 RBI, and one stolen base. Newman was designated for assignment by the Angels following the acquisition of Oswald Peraza on July 31, 2025. He cleared waivers and was released by the team on August 2.

=== Detroit Tigers ===
On August 23, 2025, Newman signed a minor league contract with the Detroit Tigers organization. He made 15 appearances for the Triple-A Toledo Mud Hens, batting .296/.377/.370 with six RBI. Newman elected free agency following the season on November 6.

=== Kansas City Royals ===
On December 12, 2025, Newman signed a minor league contract with the Kansas City Royals. He made 58 appearances for the Triple–A Omaha Storm Chasers, slashing .225/.298/.289 with 10 RBI and one stolen base. Newman was released by the Royals organization on July 25, 2026.

== Personal life ==
Newman and his wife, Shayne, gave birth to their first child, a daughter, in January 2021. They reside in Chandler, Arizona.
