= Christian Moore =

American baseball player (born 2002)

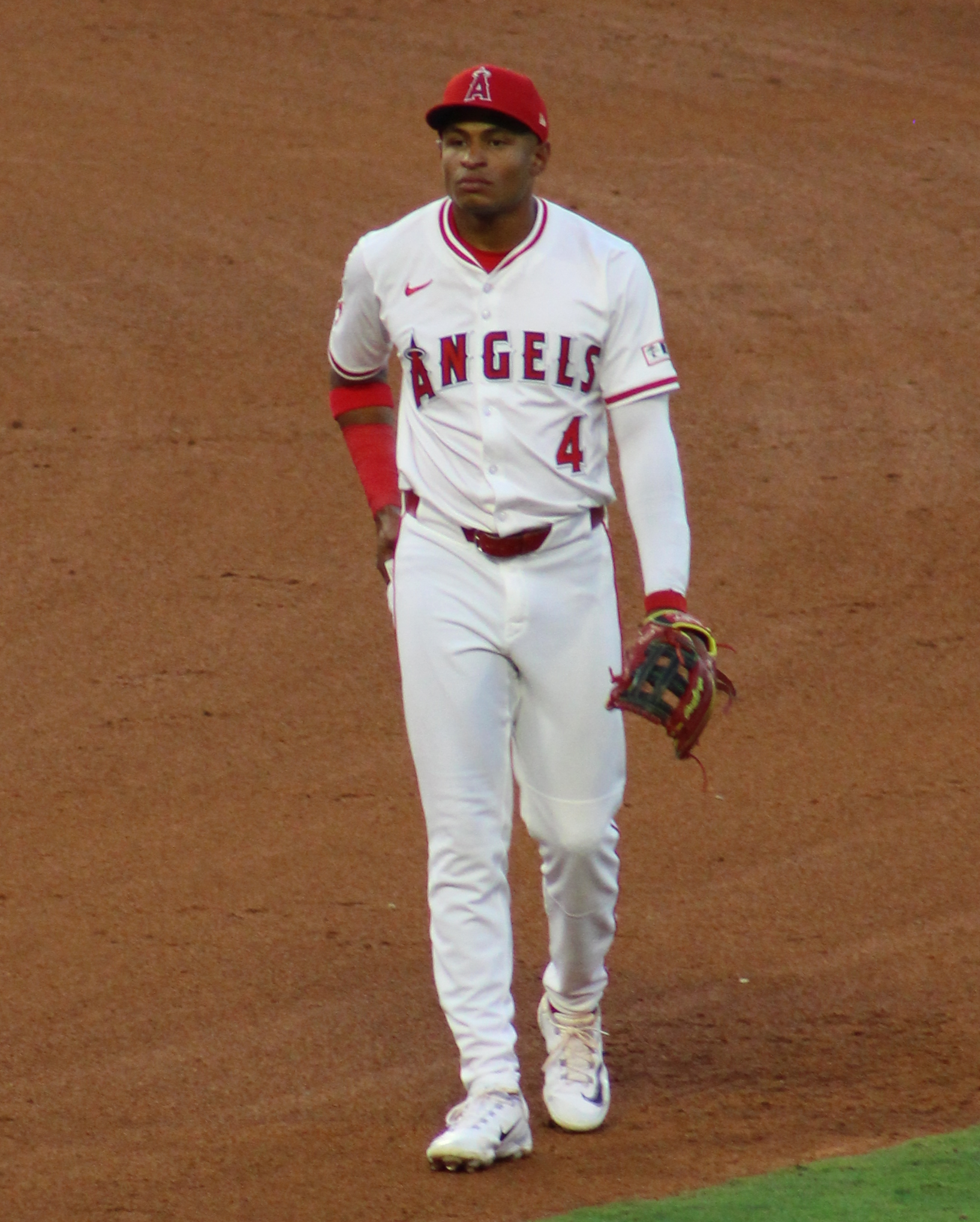
- Moore with the Los Angeles Angels in 2025

Los Angeles Angels – No. 7
- Second baseman
- Born: October 21, 2002 (age 23); Brooklyn, New York, U.S.
- Bats: Right Throws: Right

MLB debut
- June 13, 2025, for the Los Angeles Angels

MLB statistics (through 2026 season)
- Batting average: .193
- Home runs: 9
- Runs batted in: 34
- Stats at Baseball Reference

Teams
- Los Angeles Angels (2025–present)

Christian D. Moore (born October 21, 2002) is an American professional baseball second baseman for the Los Angeles Angels of Major League Baseball (MLB). He played college baseball for the Tennessee Volunteers. Moore was selected by the Angels eighth overall in the 2024 MLB draft and made his MLB debut in 2025.

== Early life ==
Christian D. Moore was born on October 21, 2002, in Brooklyn, New York, to parents Lazette and Charles Moore as the youngest of four siblings. He grew up in Red Hook and estimated that he attended 15-20 New York Mets games each season.

Moore attended Suffield Academy, a private preparatory school in Suffield, Connecticut, where he played baseball as a two-way player. In 2020, Moore participated in the Perfect Game National Showcase, earning top prospect team honors in the process. In 2021, Perfect Game ranked him at 91st on its top 100 prospects list and as the fifth-best prospect in New York state. He committed to the University of Tennessee to play college baseball.

== College career ==
=== 2022 ===
Moore made his college baseball debut with the Tennessee Volunteers as a pinch hitter in a game on February 20, 2022, against the Georgia Southern Eagles. On February 23, he hit his first home run in a game against the UNC Asheville Bulldogs. On March 6, Moore hit an inside-the-park home run against the Oklahoma Sooners. On April 24, he led the Volunteers to a comeback victory with a game-tying two-run single in the ninth inning and a game-winning home run in extra innings.

During the 2022 NCAA Division I baseball tournament, Moore began the scoring in a four-run, ninth-inning rally in a Knoxville Regional game against the Zach Neto-led Campbell Fighting Camels. The next day, he drove in two runs during a six-run ninth inning against the Georgia Tech Yellow Jackets in the regional final. Moore played in one game during Tennessee's series loss to the Notre Dame Fighting Irish at the Knoxville Super Regional, going 1-for-4 with a run scored.

As a freshman at Tennessee in 2022, Moore played in 51 games and posted a .305 batting average with 10 home runs, 36 runs batted in (RBI), a .443 on-base percentage (OBP), and a .619 slugging percentage (SLG%).

After the season he played collegiate summer baseball with the Hyannis Harbor Hawks of the Cape Cod Baseball League. In 22 games, he batted .176 with 8 RBIs.

=== 2023 ===
During a series against the Gonzaga Bulldogs in March, Moore scored eight runs, hit two home runs, and drove in four runs. On March 17, he hit a home run in a 1–0 victory against the Missouri Tigers. On April 1, Moore recorded two runs and three RBIs against the top-ranked LSU Tigers. He later posted three-run performances against the #3 Florida Gators on April 8 and the #2 Vanderbilt Commodores on April 22. During a series against the Mississippi State Bulldogs from April 27 to 29, Moore hit three home runs and had six RBIs. On May 5, he hit two home runs against the Georgia Bulldogs.

At the Clemson Regional in the 2023 NCAA Division I baseball tournament, Moore hit a two-run double and a solo home run on June 2 against the Charlotte 49ers. During a 14-inning victory against the #4 Clemson Tigers on June 3, Moore went 3-for-5 with a single, double, and home run, finishing a triple shy of hitting for the cycle. He helped Tennessee advance on June 4 with a two-home-run performance and received the MVP award for the Clemson Regional. During the 2023 Men's College World Series, Moore helped the Volunteers stave off elimination against the Stanford Cardinal with a game-tying two-run single on June 19. He went 1-for-4 with a double the following day when Tennessee was eliminated by LSU.

Moore finished the 2023 season batting .304 with 17 home runs, 13 doubles, 50 RBIs, 16 stolen bases, a .444 OBP, and a .603 SLG% in 63 games.

=== 2024 ===
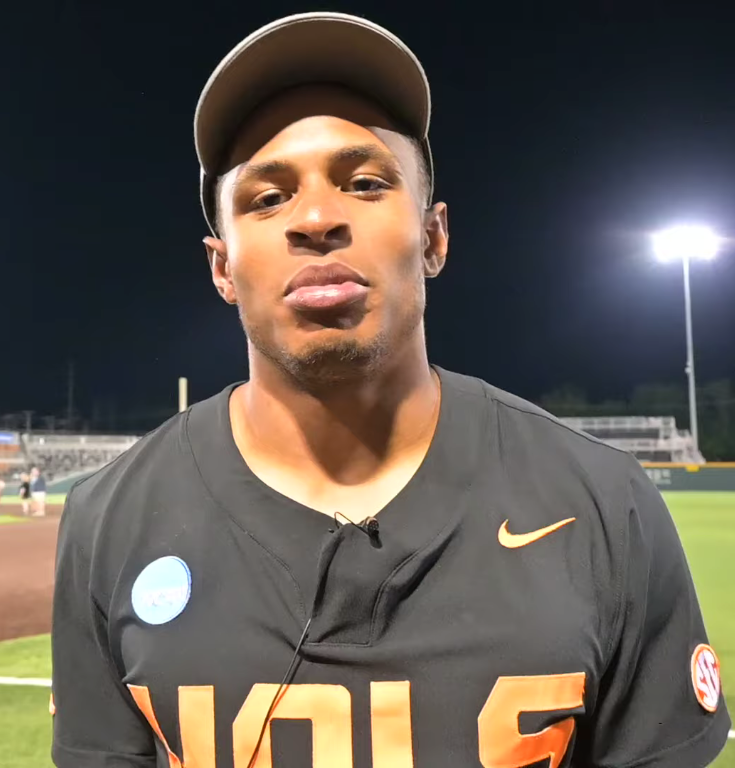
Moore with Tennessee in 2024

Moore entered his junior season in 2024 as a top prospect for the 2024 MLB draft. He played for Tennessee as the starting second baseman. During the season, he broke Tennessee's single-season school record for home runs. On June 24, 2024, Moore won the 2024 Men's College World Series after Tennessee beat Texas A&M 6-5.

== Professional career ==
=== Minor leagues ===
On July 14, 2024, Moore was drafted by the Los Angeles Angels with the 8th overall pick in the 2024 Major League Baseball draft. On July 19, the Angels signed Moore to a rookie contract with a $4.9 million bonus.

Moore made his professional debut with the Single-A Inland Empire 66ers of the California League on July 31, going 2-for-5 with a double, three runs scored, and three RBI against the Modesto Nuts. He hit his first professional home run the next day. On August 2, the Angels promoted Moore to the Double-A Rocket City Trash Pandas of the Southern League. Moore hit two home runs on August 7 against the Birmingham Barons, including a walk-off home run. He slashed .548/.576/1.194 in his first 7 games across two levels with the highest OPS among hitters drafted in 2024.

In 2024, Moore hit a combined slash line of .347/.400/.584 with 6 home runs, 6 doubles and 20 RBIs across 25 games between the two levels.

Moore was selected as a non-roster invitee to 2025 Major League Spring Training. He began the 2025 season with Rocket City and was promoted to the Triple-A Salt Lake Bees after hitting .234 with a home run, 14 RBI, and five stolen bases over 34 appearances. In 20 appearances for Salt Lake, he slashed .350/.424/.575 with 4 home runs, 18 RBI, and 3 stolen bases.

=== Major leagues ===
On June 13, 2025, Moore was promoted to the major leagues for the first time. He made his first MLB hit on June 16, recording a triple. On June 20, Moore hit his first career home run in the seventh inning off of Houston Astros pitcher Bryan King. On June 24, Moore recorded his first multi-home run game by hitting two home runs in an Angels 3-2 victory over the Boston Red Sox. In that game, he also recorded his first career walk-off home run by connecting on a two-run blast off Red Sox relief pitcher Justin Wilson in the 10th inning. He is the first player in the Expansion Era (since 1961) with multiple game-tying or go-ahead homers in the eighth or later, including a walk-off homer, in a single game within his first three career home runs.

Moore was placed on the 10-day injured list on July 3, after spraining his left thumb when he attempted a diving catch on top of the 6th inning against the Atlanta Braves. He was activated on August 3, after playing in four rehab games in Single-A. Moore was optioned to Triple-A on September 1, and was recalled on September 13. He made 53 total appearances for the Angels during his rookie campaign, batting .198/.284/.370 with seven home runs, 16 RBI, and three stolen bases.

The Angels optioned Moore to Triple-A Salt Lake to begin the 2026 season, and promoted him to the major leagues on June 18, after Mike Trout was moved to the injured list. Moore had a .333 batting average with 9 home runs and 45 RBI in 51 Triple-A games up to that point. However, after just five games with the Angels, Moore was optioned back to Triple-A after José Siri returned from the paternity list. During his brief major league stint, Moore hit 4-for-20 with 11 strikeouts.
