= Luis García (pitcher, born 1987) =

Dominican baseball player (born 1987)

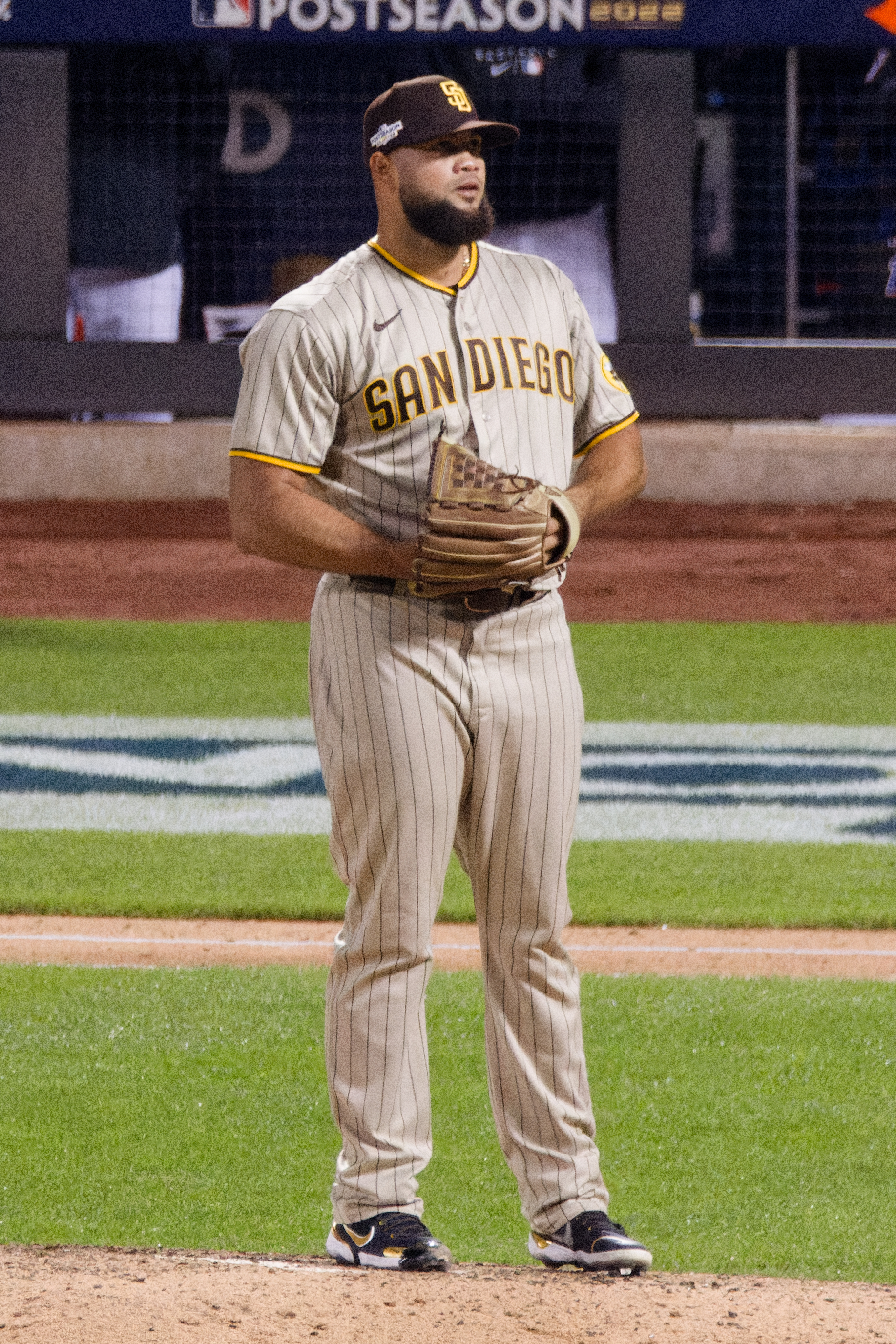
- García with the Padres in 2022

Free agent
- Pitcher
- Born: January 30, 1987 (age 39); Santo Domingo, Dominican Republic
- Bats: Right Throws: Right

MLB debut
- July 10, 2013, for the Philadelphia Phillies

MLB statistics (through May 17, 2026)
- Win–loss record: 28–31
- Earned run average: 4.20
- Strikeouts: 553
- Stats at Baseball Reference

Teams
- Philadelphia Phillies (2013–2018); Los Angeles Angels (2019); Texas Rangers (2020); St. Louis Cardinals (2021); San Diego Padres (2022–2023); Los Angeles Angels (2024); Boston Red Sox (2024); Los Angeles Dodgers (2025); Washington Nationals (2025); Los Angeles Angels (2025); New York Mets (2026); Minnesota Twins (2026)

Luis Amado García (born January 30, 1987) is a Dominican professional baseball pitcher who is a free agent. He has previously played in Major League Baseball (MLB) for the Philadelphia Phillies, Los Angeles Angels, Texas Rangers, St. Louis Cardinals, San Diego Padres, Boston Red Sox, Los Angeles Dodgers, Washington Nationals, New York Mets, and Minnesota Twins.

García was originally signed by the Dodgers organization as an amateur free agent in 2004, at the age of 16. His initial MLB call-up occurred on July 9, 2013. García made his big league debut the next day against the Nationals at Citizens Bank Park. That day, he pitched one scoreless inning, in relief of Phillies ace, Cliff Lee.

García has had two stints playing professional baseball, initially from 2006–2010, and from 2013 to present. During the period in between stints, García was mostly out of baseball, working in the barbering and moving businesses, save for a brief, rocky 2012 comeback attempt in independent ball.

== Professional career ==
=== Early professional career (2006–10) ===
García was originally signed by the Los Angeles Dodgers organization as an amateur free agent on January 22, 2004, and first played in the Dominican Summer League for them in 2006. He remained in the Dodgers organization until 2009; on August 31, García was traded to the Washington Nationals along with a player to be named later (Victor Garate), for infielder Ronnie Belliard. In total in 2009, García had six wins, three losses, with a 2.76 earned run average (ERA), and five saves, with the Great Lakes Loons and Potomac Nationals. He spent the 2010 season in the Nationals organization, playing for Potomac and the Hagerstown Suns before electing free agency on November 6, 2010.

=== Philadelphia Phillies ===
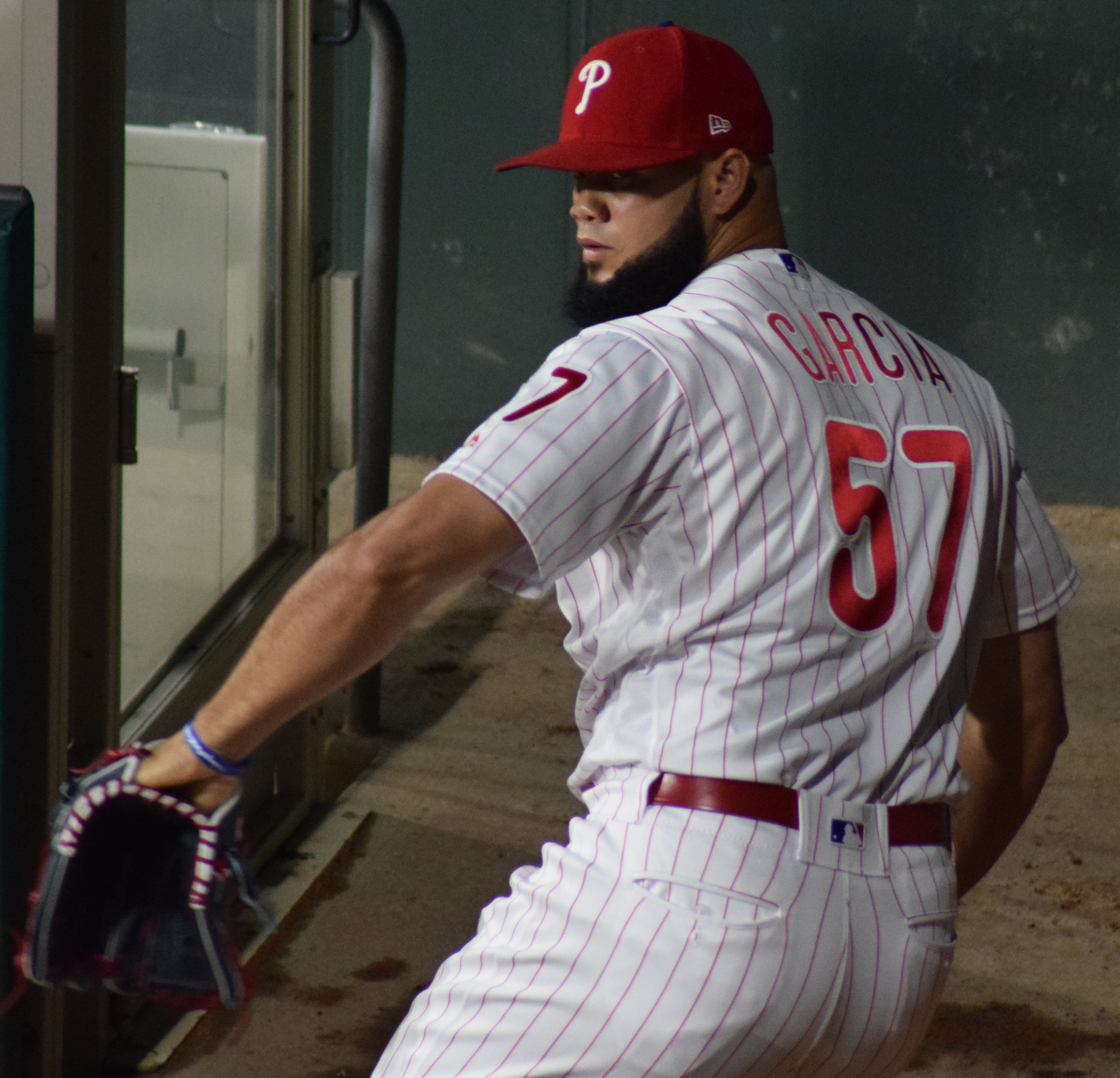
García with the Phillies in 2018

After spending 2011 out of baseball and in 2012 pitching only nine games for the Newark Bears of the Can-Am League during which he totaled an 11.57 ERA, García assumed his professional career was over, and began trying to learn the trade of barbering at a salon in New Jersey. At night, he worked at a moving company.

At that time, García's only baseball activity was teaching children and a few pickup games, yet Philadelphia Phillies international scouting director Sal Agostinelli heard about García and sent someone to watch him throw. After discovering that García consistently threw a fastball that was 94 miles per hour (mph) as well as an "impressive" slider, Agostinelli had García come to Phillies spring training. The Phillies signed him to a minor league contract and assigned him to the Clearwater Threshers, their High-A affiliate, on March 25, 2013. Agostinelli was quoted as saying, "It's literally one of those things as a scout that you dream about."

Despite his accolades from the scouting staff, García was not expected to reach the majors. Beginning the year in Clearwater before earning promotions to the Double-A Reading Fightin Phils and the Triple-A Lehigh Valley IronPigs, García combined to post a 1.67 ERA and 9.3 strikeouts per nine innings pitched (K/9). He was called up to the Major Leagues on July 9, 2013. He made his debut the following day, working a scoreless eighth inning versus the Nationals and recording his first MLB strikeout against Ryan Zimmerman. He pitched in 24 games that season, allowing 13 earned runs in 31 1/3 innings for a 3.73 ERA and picked up his first major league win in his final appearance of the season, against the Atlanta Braves on September 28.

García was optioned to Lehigh Valley to begin the 2014 season, where he produced a 0.96 ERA (five earned runs in 46 2/3 innings) in 39 games. He was recalled to the majors on May 8 and appeared in 13 games for the Phillies, allowing 10 runs in 14 innings. In 2015, García made the Phillies' Opening Day roster after a strong spring training. His performance during the first half of the season was characterized as "inconsistent" by then-interim manager Pete Mackanin, who said García had been hanging too many sliders. Nevertheless, he remained with the Phillies all season, appearing in 72 games with a 3.51 ERA in 66 2/3 innings and a 4–6 record. He also picked up the first two saves of his major league career, with the first occurring on May 15 against the Arizona Diamondbacks.

García returned to the minors to start the 2016 season and was up and down between the Phillies and Lehigh Valley all season. He pitched in 48 games in Triple-A with a 6–3 record and 2.14 ERA while struggling in the majors, with a 6.46 ERA in 17 games. In 2017, he again began in the minors Though he wound up spending most of the season with the Phillies, appearing in 66 games with a 2–5 record and 2.65 ERA.

In 2018, García was 3–1, with one save, in 59 games, with a 6.07 ERA, a 1.46 WHIP, and 51 strikeouts in 46 innings.

=== Los Angeles Angels ===
On December 6, 2018, the Phillies traded García to the Los Angeles Angels for relief pitcher José Álvarez. García made 64 appearances for the Angels in 2019, posting a 2–1 record and 4.35 ERA. He became a free agent following the 2019 season.

=== Texas Rangers ===
On January 9, 2020, García signed a minor league deal with the Texas Rangers that included an invite to Spring Training. With the minor league season cancelled because of the COVID-19 pandemic, García began the season at the Rangers alternate training site. He was added back to the major league roster on August 18 On September 15, García was designated for assignment after struggling to a 7.56 ERA in 11 games. He was granted free agency on September 17.

=== New York Yankees ===
On December 12, 2020, García signed a minor league contract with the New York Yankees organization. He was assigned to the Triple-A Scranton/Wilkes-Barre RailRiders to begin the 2021 season, where he made 18 appearances, logging a 1–2 record and 3.63 ERA. He was granted his released by the Yankees on July 6.

=== St. Louis Cardinals ===
On July 9, 2021, García signed a major league contract with the St. Louis Cardinals. He debuted for the Cardinals against the Chicago Cubs on the same day and hit the first batter he faced, Willson Contreras, in the head with a fastball. He wound up pitching in 34 games for the Cardinals in 2021, with a 3.24 ERA in 33 1/3 innings. He also pitched in the post-season for the first time in his career, working 1 2/3 scoreless innings in the Wild Card Game against the Dodgers.

=== San Diego Padres ===
On December 1, 2021, García signed a two-year contract with the San Diego Padres. He pitched in 37 games during his contract, with a 6–9 record and 3.73 ERA. In the 2022 postseason, he pitched 4 2/3 innings across four games with the only run he gave up being a home run by Kyle Schwarber of the Phillies in the sixth inning of Game 4 of the National League Championship Series.

=== Los Angeles Angels (second stint) ===
On December 13, 2023, García signed a one-year, $4.25 million contract to return to the Los Angeles Angels. He made 45 appearances out of the bullpen for the Angels in 2024, compiling a 3.71 ERA with 40 strikeouts and 4 saves across 43 2/3 innings pitched.

=== Boston Red Sox ===
On July 30, 2024, García was traded to the Boston Red Sox in exchange for minor league players Niko Kavadas, Matthew Lugo, Yeferson Vargas and Ryan Zeferjahn. In 15 appearances for Boston, García struggled to an 8.22 ERA with 13 strikeouts across 15 1/3 innings pitched.

=== Los Angeles Dodgers ===
On February 13, 2025, García signed a minor league contract with the Los Angeles Dodgers. On March 17, the Dodgers selected his contract after he made the team's Opening Day roster. In 28 appearances for Los Angeles, he compiled a 2-0 record and 5.27 ERA with 24 strikeouts across 27 1/3 innings pitched. On June 29, García was designated for assignment by the Dodgers; he was released by the team after clearing waivers on July 4.

=== Washington Nationals ===
On July 8, 2025, García signed a major league contract with the Washington Nationals. García made 10 appearances for the Nationals, recording an 0.90 ERA with seven strikeouts across 10 innings pitched.

=== Los Angeles Angels (third stint) ===
On July 30, 2025, the Nationals traded García to the Los Angeles Angels, along with Andrew Chafin, in exchange for Jake Eder and Sam Brown. García made 20 relief appearances down the stretch for Los Angeles, compiling an 0-2 record and 2.00 ERA with 17 strikeouts and two saves over 18 innings of work.

=== New York Mets ===
On January 21, 2026, García signed a one-year, $1.75 million contract with the New York Mets. He made six appearances for New York, but struggled to a 7.11 ERA with four strikeouts across 6 1/3 innings pitched. On April 12, García was designated for assignment by the Mets. He was released by New York on April 15.

=== Minnesota Twins ===
On April 22, 2026, García signed a minor league contract with the Minnesota Twins. After two appearances for the Triple-A St. Paul Saints, the Twins added García to their active roster on April 28. He made nine appearances for the Twins, struggling to an 0-1 record and 10.38 ERA with two strikeouts and two saves across 8 2/3 innings pitched. García was designated for assignment by Minnesota on May 23. He elected free agency after clearing waivers two days later.
