= Michael Darrell-Hicks =

American baseball player (born 1997)

Pittsburgh Pirates
- Pitcher
- Born: November 13, 1997 (age 29); Parkersburg, West Virginia, U.S.
- Bats: Right Throws: Right

MLB debut
- April 11, 2025, for the Los Angeles Angels

MLB statistics (through 2025 season)
- Win–loss record: 1–0
- Earned run average: 7.45
- Strikeouts: 8
- Stats at Baseball Reference

Teams
- Los Angeles Angels (2025); Pittsburgh Pirates (2025)

Michael Brian Darrell-Hicks (born November 13, 1997) is an American professional baseball pitcher in the Pittsburgh Pirates organization. He has previously played in MLB for the Los Angeles Angels.

== Career ==
=== Amateur career ===
Darrell-Hicks graduated from South Warren High School in Bowling Green, Kentucky, graduating in 2016. He enrolled at Western Kentucky University, and played college baseball for the Western Kentucky Hilltoppers for three years. He transferred to Jacksonville University and played for one season with the Jacksonville Dolphins.

=== Los Angeles Angels ===
Darrell-Hicks signed with the Los Angeles Angels as an undrafted free agent on July 26, 2022. He spent a majority of the 2023 and 2024 seasons with the Rocket City Trash Pandas, pitching to a 6–7 record, pitching 53 2/3 innings in 33 games (including three starts), while striking out 58 and walking 13 batters. Darrell-Hicks began the 2025 season on the roster of the Salt Lake Bees.

On April 6, 2025, Darrell-Hicks was promoted to the major leagues for the first time. He made his MLB debut on April 11 against the Houston Astros. In six appearances for Los Angeles, he struggled to a 9.39 ERA with six strikeouts and one win across 7 2/3 innings pitched. Darrell-Hicks was designated for assignment following the acquisition of LaMonte Wade Jr. on June 8.

=== Pittsburgh Pirates ===
On June 13, 2025, Darrell-Hicks was claimed off waivers by the Pittsburgh Pirates. He made one scoreless appearance for Pittsburgh, recording two strikeouts over two innings pitched. Darrell-Hicks was designated for assignment by the Pirates on November 6. On November 10, he cleared waivers and was sent outright to the Triple-A Indianapolis Indians.

In 2026, he played in 42 games (1 start) between Triple-A, Single-A and Rookie ball throwing 48 innings going 1–1 with a 3.94 ERA with 56 strikeouts and 3 saves.
