= Garrett McDaniels =

American baseball player (born 1999)

Los Angeles Dodgers
- Pitcher
- Born: December 15, 1999 (age 26); Marion, South Carolina, U.S.
- Bats: Left Throws: Left

MLB debut
- March 31, 2025, for the Los Angeles Angels

MLB statistics (through 2025 season)
- Win–loss record: 0–0
- Earned run average: 5.91
- Strikeouts: 6
- Stats at Baseball Reference

Teams
- Los Angeles Angels (2025)

Garrett Nicholas McDaniels (born December 15, 1999) is an American professional baseball pitcher in the Los Angeles Dodgers organization. He has previously played in Major League Baseball (MLB) for the Los Angeles Angels, for whom he made his MLB debut in 2025.

== Career ==
=== Amateur career ===
McDaniels attended Pee Dee Academy in Mullins, South Carolina, and Coastal Carolina University, where he played college baseball for the Coastal Carolina Chanticleers. He transferred to the University of Mount Olive to play for the Mount Olive Trojans and he underwent Tommy John surgery.

=== Los Angeles Dodgers ===
While he rehabilitated, the Los Angeles Dodgers signed McDaniels to a free agent contract on May 19, 2022. He made his professional debut with the rookie-level Arizona Complex League Dodgers.

McDaniels split the 2023 season between the ACL Dodgers and the Single-A Rancho Cucamonga Quakes, accumulating a 2.50 ERA with 23 strikeouts and 2 saves over 18 innings of work. He spent the 2024 campaign with the Double-A Tulsa Drillers, High-A Great Lakes Loons, and Rancho Cucamonga. In 33 appearances split between the three affiliates, McDaniels posted a cumulative 5–5 record and 3.19 ERA with 84 strikeouts across 73 1/3 innings pitched.

=== Los Angeles Angels ===
On December 11, 2024, the Los Angeles Angels selected McDaniels from the Dodgers in the Rule 5 draft. McDaniels made the Angels' Opening Day roster. He made his MLB debut with the Angels on March 31 versus the St. Louis Cardinals. In 10 appearances for Los Angeles, McDaniels recorded a 5.91 ERA with six strikeouts across 10 2/3 innings pitched. McDaniels was designated for assignment by the Angels on June 9.

=== Los Angeles Dodgers (second stint) ===
On June 14, 2025, the Angels returned McDaniels to the Dodgers organization, as required by his Rule 5 status. He was assigned to the Triple-A Oklahoma City Comets, where he was 3–1 with a 3.30 ERA in 25 games. He returned to Oklahoma City in 2026, and was 8–1 with a 3.02 ERA in 44 2/3 innings over 42 games.

== See also ==
- Rule 5 draft results
