= Denzer Guzmán =

Dominican baseball player (born 2004)

Los Angeles Angels – No. 23
- Shortstop
- Born: 8 February 2004 (age 22); San Pedro de Macorís, Dominican Republic
- Bats: Right Throws: Right

MLB debut
- 13 September, 2025, for the Los Angeles Angels

MLB statistics (through 2026 season)
- Batting average: .215
- Home runs: 10
- Runs batted in: 36
- Stats at Baseball Reference

Teams
- Los Angeles Angels (2025–present)

Denzer Guzmán (born 8 February 2004) is a Dominican professional baseball shortstop for the Los Angeles Angels of Major League Baseball (MLB). He made his MLB debut in 2025.

== Career ==
On 15 January 2021, Guzmán signed with the Angels as an international prospect for $2 million. He was first assigned to the rookie-level Dominican Summer League Angels on 8 June. In 44 DSL games, Guzmán batted .213 with three home runs and 27 RBI. On 6 June 2022, Guzmán was assigned to the rookie-level Arizona Complex League Angels. In 52 games, Guzmán batted .286 with three home runs and 33 RBI. On 25 August, he was promoted to the Single-A Inland Empire 66ers of the California League. In five games with Inland Empire, Guzmán went 3-for-17 (.176) with two RBI.

Guzmán returned to Inland Empire to begin the 2023 season, playing in 111 games and hitting .239/.309/.371 with seven home runs, 52 RBI, and eight stolen bases. He split the 2024 campaign between the High-A Tri-City Dust Devils and Double-A Rocket City Trash Pandas. In 102 appearances for the two affiliates, Guzmán slashed a cumulative .224/.302/.315 with six home runs, 35 RBI, and 10 stolen bases.

Guzmán started the 2025 season with Rocket City. He was named the Southern League Player of the Month for July, batting 333/.440/.580. Guzmán slashed .278/.364/.467 with 11 homers, 53 RBI, and an .831 OPS in 84 games at Rocket City, to be promoted to the Triple-A Salt Lake Bees on 2 August 2025.

On 13 September 2025, Guzmán was selected to the 40-man roster and promoted to the major leagues for the first time. He made his debut the same day against the Seattle Mariners starting at shortstop, going 0-for-3. On 16 September, Guzmán hit his first career home run off of Freddy Peralta of the Milwaukee Brewers. He made 13 appearances for Los Angeles during his rookie campaign, batting .190/.209/.357 with two home runs and three RBI.

Guzmán was optioned to Triple-A Salt Lake to begin the 2026 season.
