= Bryce Teodosio =

American baseball player (born 1999)

Los Angeles Angels – No. 22
- Outfielder
- Born: June 18, 1999 (age 27); Greenville, South Carolina, U.S.
- Bats: Right Throws: Left

MLB debut
- September 7, 2024, for the Los Angeles Angels

MLB statistics (through 2026 season)
- Batting average: .200
- Home runs: 1
- Runs batted in: 13
- Stats at Baseball Reference

Teams
- Los Angeles Angels (2024–present)

Bryce Thomas Teodosio (born June 18, 1999) is an American professional baseball outfielder for the Los Angeles Angels of Major League Baseball (MLB). He made his MLB debut in 2024.

== Amateur career ==
A native of Greenville, South Carolina, Teodosio played college baseball at Clemson University. In 2019, he played collegiate summer baseball with the Hyannis Harbor Hawks of the Cape Cod Baseball League.

== Professional career ==
On July 29, 2021, Teodosio signed with the Los Angeles Angels as an undrafted free agent. He spent his first professional season with the rookie–level Arizona Complex League Angels and Single–A Inland Empire 66ers.

Teodosio spent the 2022 campaign with the Double–A Rocket City Trash Pandas, playing in 112 games and hitting .192/.295/.333 with 14 home runs, 41 RBI, and 28 stolen bases. He returned to Rocket City in 2023, making 118 appearances and slashing .212/.299/.315 with seven home runs, 39 RBI, and 16 stolen bases.

Teodosio began 2024 with the Triple–A Salt Lake Bees, playing in 114 games and batting .276/.339/.418 with five home runs, 51 RBI, and 40 stolen bases. On September 7, 2024, Teodosio was selected to the 40-man roster and promoted to the major leagues for the first time. In 5 games during his rookie campaign, he went 1–for–12 (.083). On November 22, the Angels non–tendered Teodosio, making him a free agent.

On November 27, 2024, Teodosio re–signed with the Angels organization on a minor league contract. After missing three months of the season, he batted .330/.385/.511 with one home run, 12 RBI, and 10 stolen bases across 25 games for the ACL Angels and Salt Lake. On August 2, 2025, the Angels selected Teodosio's contract, adding him to their active roster. On September 23, Teodosio hit his first career home run, a two-run shot off of Kansas City Royals starter Cole Ragans.
