= Ryan Zeferjahn =

American baseball player (born 1998)

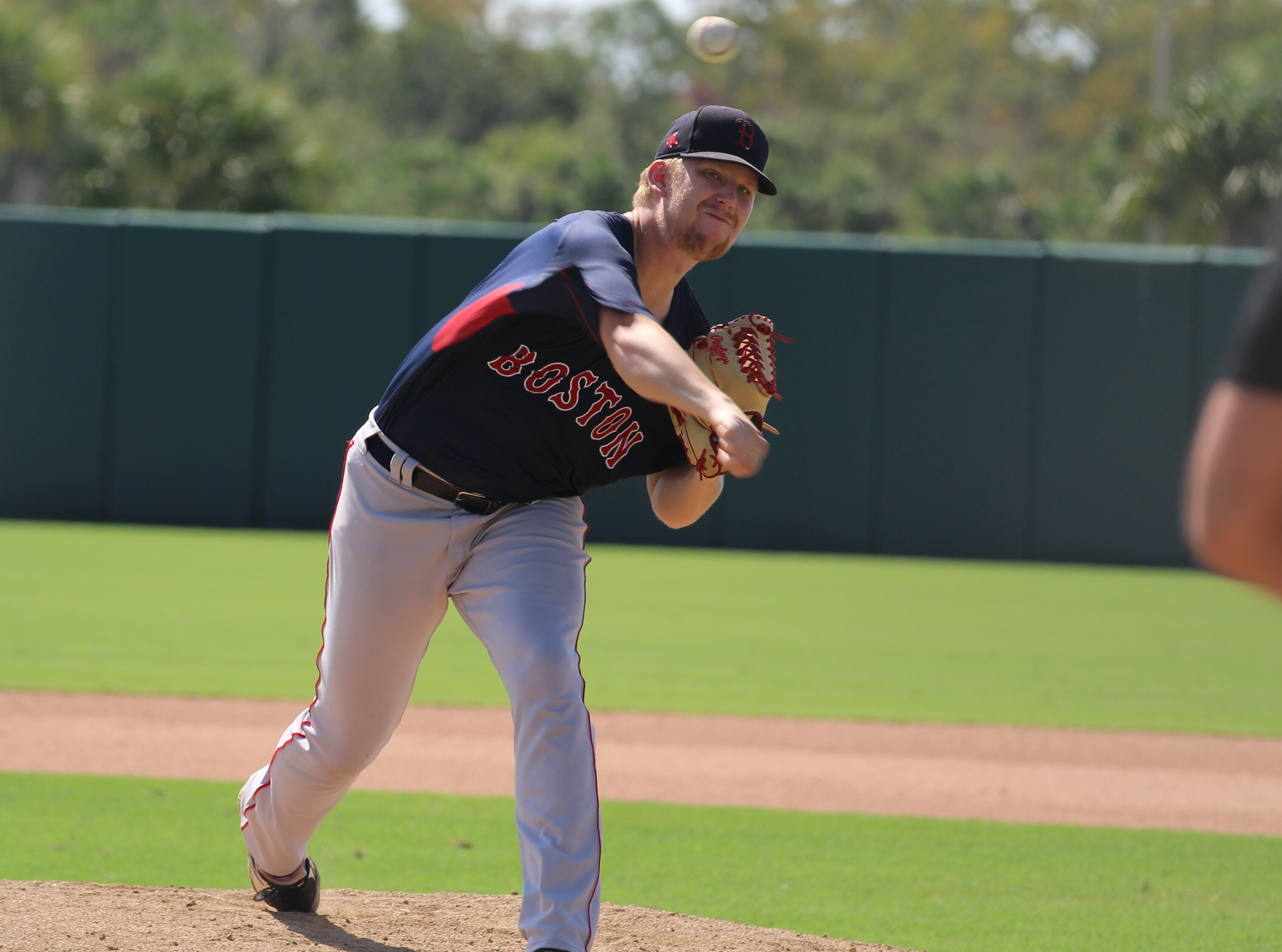
- Zeferjahn pitching in the Florida Complex League in 2021

Chicago Cubs – No. 56
- Pitcher
- Born: February 28, 1998 (age 28); Topeka, Kansas, U.S.
- Bats: Right Throws: Right

MLB debut
- August 25, 2024, for the Los Angeles Angels

MLB statistics (through 2026 season)
- Win–loss record: 10–9
- Earned run average: 4.01
- Strikeouts: 185
- Stats at Baseball Reference

Teams
- Los Angeles Angels (2024–2026); Chicago Cubs (2026–present)

Ryan Joseph Zeferjahn (/ˈzɛfərdʒɑːn/ ZEF-ər-jahn; born February 28, 1998) is an American professional baseball pitcher for the Chicago Cubs of Major League Baseball (MLB). He has previously played in MLB for the Los Angeles Angels.

== Amateur career ==
A native of Topeka, Kansas, Zeferjahn graduated from Seaman High School. He played college baseball at the University of Kansas. In 2017, he played collegiate summer baseball with the Falmouth Commodores of the Cape Cod Baseball League.

== Professional career ==
=== Boston Red Sox ===
The Boston Red Sox selected Zeferjahn in the third round, with the 107th overall selection, of the 2019 Major League Baseball draft. He made his professional debut with the Low–A Lowell Spinners, logging a 4.50 ERA in 12 starts. Zeferjahn did not play in a game in 2020 due to the cancellation of the minor league season because of the COVID-19 pandemic.

Zeferjahn returned to action in 2021 with the rookie–level Florida Complex League Red Sox and Single–A Salem Red Sox. In 16 starts between the two affiliates, he compiled a 1–4 record and 5.98 ERA with 59 strikeouts across 55 2/3 innings pitched. Zeferjahn split the 2022 campaign between the High–A Greenville Drive and Double–A Portland Sea Dogs. In 34 appearances pitching mainly in relief, he accumulated a 5–4 record and 5.05 ERA with 80 strikeouts over 71 1/3 innings pitched.

Zeferjahn spent 2023 with Portland, also making two scoreless outings for Salem. In 34 appearances out of the bullpen for Portland, he recorded a 5.02 ERA with 68 strikeouts across 43 innings of work. Zeferjahn began the 2024 season with Portland, and was promoted to the Triple–A Worcester Red Sox after seven scoreless appearances. In 18 games for Worcester, he registered a 5.47 ERA with 31 strikeouts and 4 saves over 24 2/3 innings.

=== Los Angeles Angels ===
On July 30, 2024, Zeferjahn, Matthew Lugo, Yeferson Vargas, and Niko Kavadas were traded to the Los Angeles Angels in exchange for Luis García. In five games for the Triple–A Salt Lake Bees, he posted a 2.35 ERA with 8 strikeouts. On August 23, Zeferjahn was selected to the 40-man roster and promoted to the major leagues for the first time. In 12 appearances for Los Angeles during his rookie campaign, Zeferjahn recorded a 2.12 ERA with 18 strikeouts over 17 innings of work.

On April 6, 2025, Zeferjahn recorded his first career win after tossing a scoreless sixth inning against the Cleveland Guardians. He made 62 appearances for the Angels during the regular season, logging a 6–5 record and 4.74 ERA with 73 strikeouts and two saves over 57 innings pitched.

Zeferjahn made 45 appearances out of the bullpen for Los Angeles in 2026, compiling a 4–3 record and 3.66 ERA with 75 strikeouts and four saves across 51 2/3 innings pitched.

=== Chicago Cubs ===
On August 3, 2026, the Angels traded Zeferjahn to the Chicago Cubs in exchange for Moises Ballesteros and Mason McGwire.
