= Logan Davidson =

American baseball player (born 1997)

Free agent
- Infielder
- Born: December 26, 1997 (age 28); Charlotte, North Carolina, U.S.
- Bats: Switch Throws: Right

MLB debut
- May 24, 2025, for the Athletics

MLB statistics (through 2025 season)
- Batting average: .167
- Home runs: 1
- Runs batted in: 4
- Stats at Baseball Reference

Teams
- Athletics (2025); Los Angeles Angels (2025)

Logan Douglas Davidson (born December 26, 1997) is an American professional baseball infielder who is a free agent. He has previously played in Major League Baseball (MLB) for the Athletics and Los Angeles Angels. He played college baseball for the Clemson Tigers before the Oakland Athletics selected him in the first round of the 2019 MLB draft.

== Amateur career ==
Davidson attended Providence High School in Charlotte, North Carolina. In 2015, he helped lead the Providence baseball team to the North Carolina 4A state title. In 2016, The Charlotte Observer named him their high school baseball player of the year. He enrolled at Clemson University, where he played college baseball for the Clemson Tigers. In 2017 and 2018, he played collegiate summer baseball with the Falmouth Commodores of the Cape Cod Baseball League.

== Professional career ==
=== Oakland Athletics / Athletics ===
The Oakland Athletics selected Davidson in the first round, with the 29th overall selection, of the 2019 Major League Baseball draft. After Davidson signed with Oakland, he was assigned to the Vermont Lake Monsters of the Low-A New York-Penn League. Over 54 games, he batted .239 with four home runs and 12 RBI.

Oakland invited Davidson to spring training as a non-roster player in 2020, but he did not play a minor league game due to the cancellation of the season because of the COVID-19 pandemic. He was assigned to the Midland RockHounds of the Double-A Central in 2021, slashing .212/.307/.313 with seven home runs and 48 RBI over 119 games. After the 2021 regular season, he earned a spot playing for the Mesa Solar Sox in the Arizona Fall League.

The Athletics invited Davidson to spring training as a non-roster player in 2022. He returned to Midland for the 2022 season, playing in 111 games and hitting .252/.337/.406 with 14 home runs, 56 RBI, and four stolen bases. The Athletics also invited Davidson to spring training as a non-roster player in 2023. He was assigned to the Las Vegas Aviators of the Triple-A Pacific Coast League during the regular season, splitting time between them and Midland; in 109 total games, he batted .279/.355/.426 with 10 home runs, 59 RBI, and six stolen bases.

Davidson split the 2024 season between Triple-A Las Vegas and the rookie-level Arizona Complex League Athletics. In 90 appearances for the two affiliates, he slashed .303/.373/.543 with 15 home runs, 54 RBI, and seven stolen bases.

Davidson began the 2025 campaign with Triple-A Las Vegas, playing in 41 contests and hitting .303/.452/.428 with two home runs, 22 RBI, and seven stolen bases. On May 23, 2025, Davidson was selected to the 40-man roster and promoted to the major leagues for the first time. In nine appearances for the Athletics, he went 3-for-20 (.150) with two RBI and three walks. Davidson was designated for assignment following the promotion of Ben Bowden on July 23.

=== Houston Astros ===
On July 25, 2025, Davidson was claimed off waivers by the Houston Astros. In 22 appearances for the Triple-A Sugar Land Space Cowboys, he batted .207/.290/.390 with three home runs and 11 RBI. Davidson was designated for assignment by the Astros on September 1.

=== Los Angeles Angels ===
On September 3, 2025, Davidson was claimed off waivers by the Los Angeles Angels. On September 11, Davidson hit his first career home run off of Bryce Miller of the Seattle Mariners. On September 13, Davidson recorded his first career strikeout as a pitcher, punching out Mariners infielder Eugenio Suárez. In 10 appearances for Los Angeles, he went 4-for-22 (.182) with one home run and two RBI. On October 22, Davidson was removed from the 40-man roster and sent outright to the Triple-A Salt Lake Bees. He elected free agency following the season on November 6.

=== Tampa Bay Rays ===
On December 9, 2025, Davidson signed a minor league contract with the Tampa Bay Rays. In 114 games with Triple-A Durham Bulls he batted .204/.311/.376 with 15 home runs, 52 RBIs and 13 stolen bases. He elected free agency on November 2.

== Personal life ==
Davidson's father, Mark Davidson, played in MLB. His sister, Taylor, played tennis for Stanford University.
