= Jack Kochanowicz =

American baseball player (born 2000)

Los Angeles Angels – No. 41
- Pitcher
- Born: December 22, 2000 (age 25); Philadelphia, Pennsylvania, U.S.
- Bats: Left Throws: Right

MLB debut
- July 11, 2024, for the Los Angeles Angels

MLB statistics (through 2026 season)
- Win–loss record: 7–22
- Earned run average: 5.84
- Strikeouts: 144
- Stats at Baseball Reference

Teams
- Los Angeles Angels (2024–present)

Jack Von Kochanowicz (ko-HAWN-o-wits; born December 22, 2000) is an American professional baseball pitcher for the Los Angeles Angels of Major League Baseball (MLB). He made his MLB debut in 2024.

== Career ==
Kochanowicz attended Harriton High School in Rosemont, Pennsylvania. He played for the travel club Houston Banditos after his freshman season. He was drafted by the Los Angeles Angels in the third round, with the 92nd overall selection, of the 2019 MLB draft. Kochanowicz did not play in a game in 2020 due to the cancellation of the minor league season because of the COVID-19 pandemic. He made his professional debut in 2021 with the Single-A Inland Empire 66ers, logging a 4–2 record and 6.91 ERA with 73 strikeouts across 20 games (18 starts).

Kochanowicz returned to Inland Empire in 2022, compiling a 4–4 record and 4.99 ERA with 53 strikeouts over 17 appearances (9 starts). He was the California League pitcher of the week in mid-July. He split the 2023 campaign between the High-A Tri-City Dust Devils and Double-A Rocket City Trash Pandas. In 21 starts between the two affiliates, Kochanowicz accumulated a 5–5 record and 5.27 ERA with 69 strikeouts across 94 innings pitched. On November 13, the Angels added Kochanowicz to their 40-man roster to protect him from the Rule 5 draft.

Kochanowicz was optioned to the Triple-A Salt Lake Bees to begin the 2024 season. On July 11, he was promoted to the major leagues for the first time. He threw three innings, yielded five runs on seven hits, hit two batters with pitches, and took a loss against the Seattle Mariners. Kochanowicz earned his first MLB victory against the Washington Nationals on August 11.

In 2025, Kochanowicz went 3–11 with a 6.81 ERA. His ERA was the highest of any pitcher with at least 110 innings pitched, and his strikeout-to-walk rate and home runs allowed per nine innings were among the worst in the majors.

Kochanowicz made 13 starts for Los Angeles in 2026, compiling a 2-5 record and 6.19 ERA with 47 strikeouts over 64 innings of work. On June 9, 2026, it was announced that Kochanowicz would require Tommy John surgery, ending his season.
