= Jake Eder =

American baseball player (born 1998)

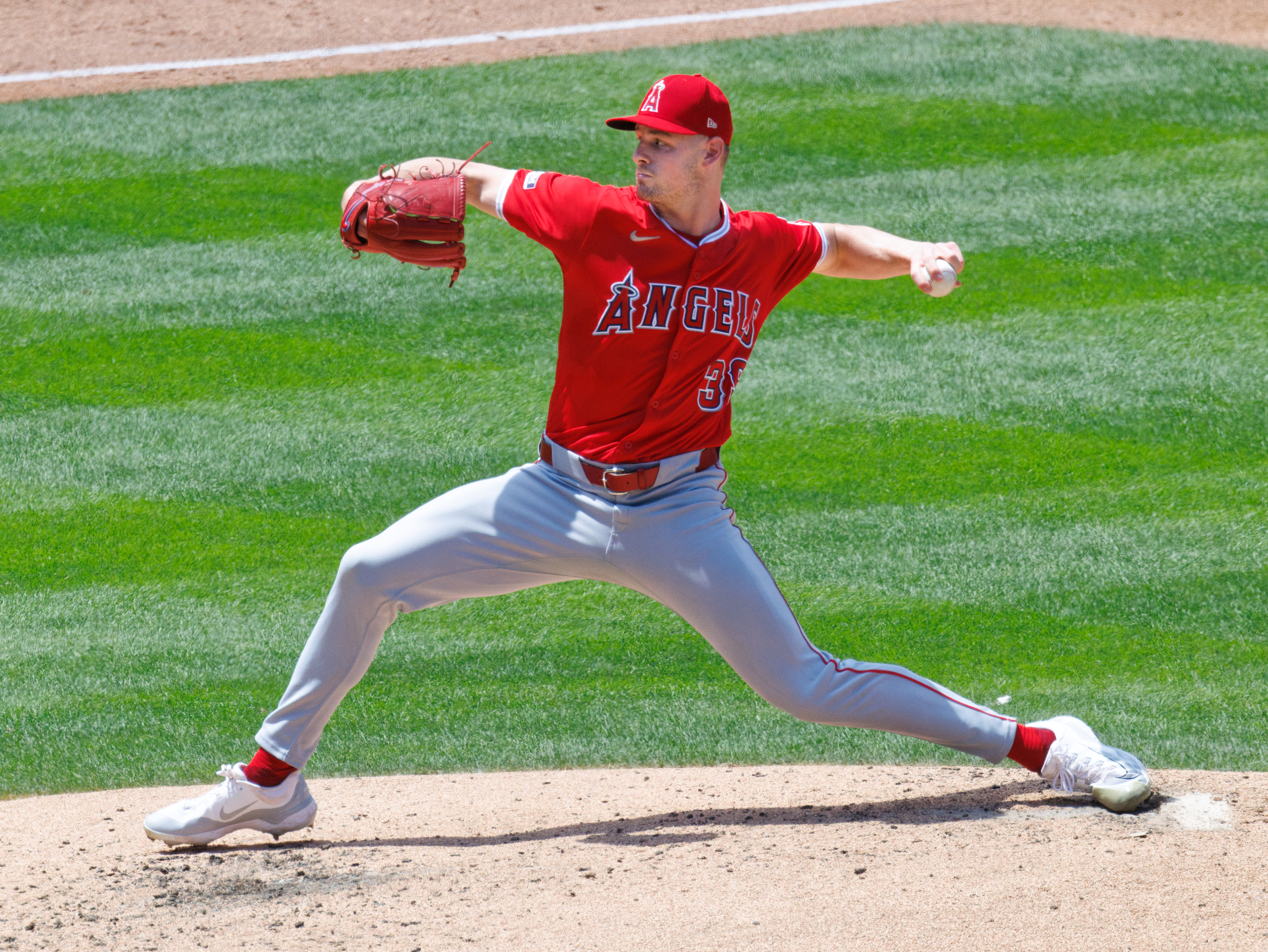
- Eder with the Angels in 2025

Free agent
- Pitcher
- Born: October 9, 1998 (age 28); Boynton Beach, Florida, U.S.
- Bats: Left Throws: Left

MLB debut
- September 17, 2024, for the Chicago White Sox

MLB statistics (through 2026 season)
- Win–loss record: 1–1
- Earned run average: 4.44
- Strikeouts: 17
- Stats at Baseball Reference

Teams
- Chicago White Sox (2024); Los Angeles Angels (2025); Los Angeles Dodgers (2026)

Jacob Andrew Eder (born October 9, 1998) is an American professional baseball pitcher who is a free agent. He has previously played in Major League Baseball (MLB) for the Chicago White Sox, Los Angeles Angels, and Los Angeles Dodgers.

== Amateur career ==
Eder attended Atlantic Community High School in Delray Beach, Florida for three years before transferring to Calvary Christian Academy in Fort Lauderdale, Florida, for his senior year. In 2017, his senior baseball season, he went 8–1 with a 1.25 ERA and 81 strikeouts. He was selected by the New York Mets in the 34th round of the 2017 Major League Baseball draft, but did not sign, and instead chose to play college baseball at Vanderbilt University.

In 2018, Eder's freshman year at Vanderbilt, he appeared in 11 games (nine starts), going 1–4 with a 5.45 ERA over 33 innings. As a sophomore in 2019, he pitched 34 1/3 innings in relief, compiling a 1–0 record, a 2.88 ERA, and 37 strikeouts. He pitched the last three innings of the third game of the 2019 College World Series, clinching Vanderbilt's second national title. Following the end of the 2019 college baseball season, he played in the Cape Cod Baseball League for the Orleans Firebirds. For his junior year in 2020, he pitched to a 1–1 record and a 3.60 ERA over four starts before the college baseball season was cut short due to the COVID-19 pandemic.

== Professional career ==
=== Miami Marlins ===
Eder was selected by the Miami Marlins in the fourth round of the 2020 Major League Baseball draft with the 104th overall pick. He signed with the team, receiving a $700,000 bonus. He did not play in a game in 2020 due to the cancellation of the minor league season because of the COVID-19 pandemic. To begin the 2021 season, Eder was assigned to the Double-A Pensacola Blue Wahoos to make his professional debut. In July, he was selected to play in the All-Star Futures Game at Coors Field as an injury replacement. In mid-August, he was placed on the injured list. In early September, it was announced that he would undergo Tommy John surgery, forcing him to miss the rest of 2021 and all of the 2022 season. Over 15 starts for the 2021 season, Eder went 3–5 with a 1.77 ERA, striking out 99 batters over 71 1/3 innings.

After missing all of 2022 recovering from surgery, Eder rehabbed with the Single-A Jupiter Hammerheads and then was assigned to Pensacola to open the 2023 season. He opened the season on the injured list with a fractured foot.

=== Chicago White Sox ===
On August 1, 2023, Eder was traded to the Chicago White Sox for Jake Burger. He was subsequently assigned to the Double-A Birmingham Barons. Over 14 starts for the season, he went 2-6 with a 6.35 ERA and 70 strikeouts over 56 2/3 innings. After the season, Eder was selected to play in the Arizona Fall League for the Glendale Desert Dogs.

On November 14, 2023, the White Sox added Eder to their 40-man roster to protect him from the Rule 5 draft. He was optioned to Double-A Birmingham to begin the 2024 season. On July 10, 2024, Eder was promoted to the major leagues for the first time to serve as the 27th man in the team's doubleheader against the Minnesota Twins. He did not appear in either game and was optioned to the Triple-A Charlotte Knights the same day. Eder was promoted again on September 13. He made his MLB debut and only appearance for the White Sox on September 17, allowing 1 run in the final two innings of a loss to the Los Angeles Angels.

Eder was optioned to Triple-A Charlotte to begin the 2025 season. He was designated for assignment by the White Sox on March 27 as the team added several non-roster invitees to their Opening Day roster.

=== Los Angeles Angels ===
On March 31, 2025, the White Sox traded Eder to the Los Angeles Angels in exchange for cash. He was subsequently assigned to the Triple-A Salt Lake Bees to begin the year. In eight appearances for Los Angeles, Eder compiled an 0-1 record and 4.91 ERA with 15 strikeouts over 18 1/3 innings of work.

=== Washington Nationals ===
On July 30, 2025, Eder and Sam Brown were traded to the Washington Nationals in exchange for Andrew Chafin and Luis García. He made three starts split between the Double-A Harrisburg Senators and Triple-A Rochester Red Wings over the remainder of the season.

Eder was optioned to Triple-A Rochester to begin the 2026 season. Washington designated Eder for assignment on March 28, 2026, following the acquisition of Curtis Mead.

=== Los Angeles Dodgers ===
On April 1, 2026, Eder was traded to the Los Angeles Dodgers in exchange for cash considerations. After beginning the season with the Triple-A Oklahoma City Comets, Eder was called up to the Dodgers on April 20. On April 27, Eder recorded his first career win after tossing a scoreless innings of relief against the Miami Marlins. He pitched four innings over four games for the Dodgers, allowing one run on three hits. Eder also pitched in 18 games for Oklahoma City, allowing 10 runs in 21 innings of work. He was placed in the minor league injured list on July 1, and was later released by Los Angeles on July 6.
