= Zach Neto =

American baseball player (born 2001)

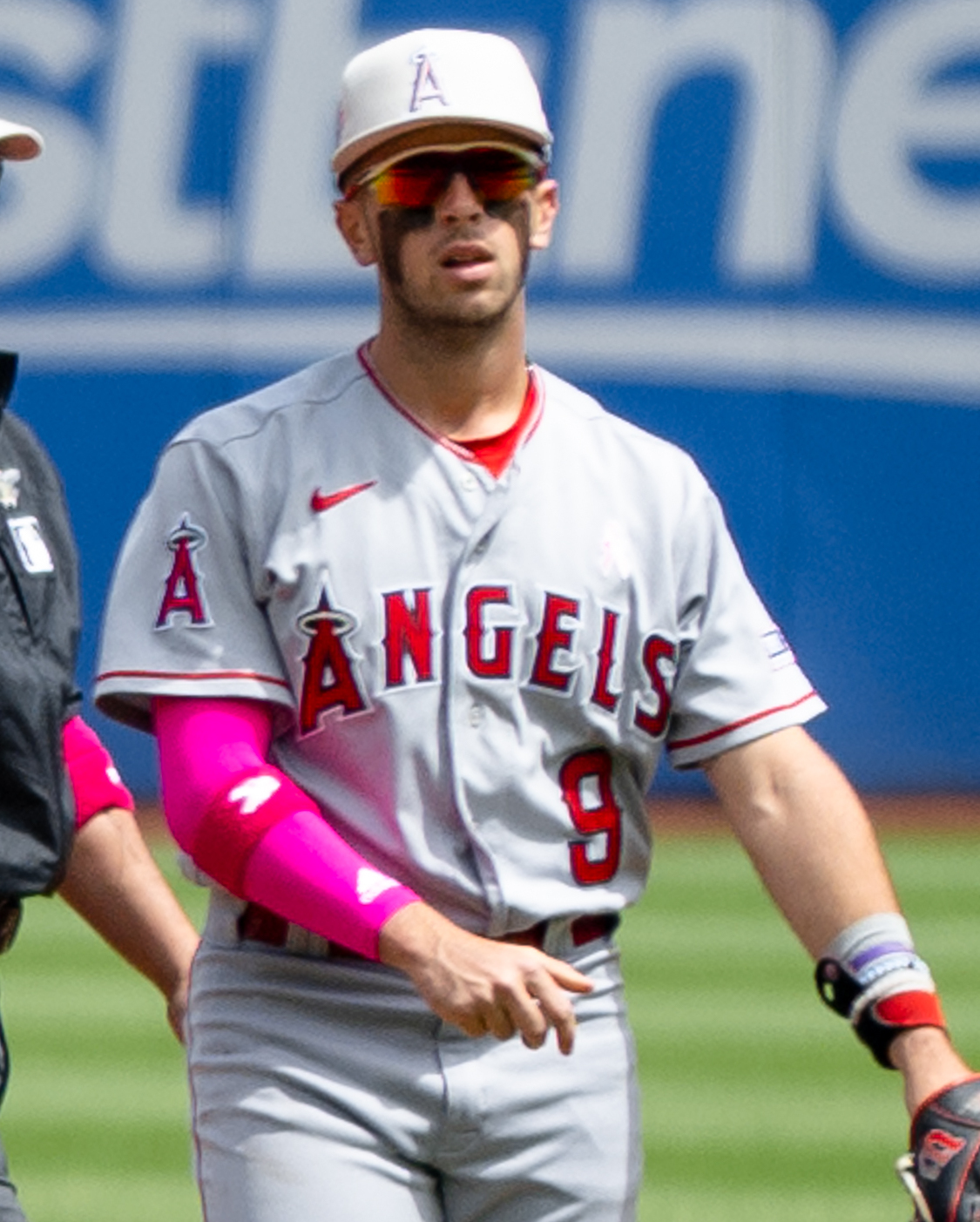
- Neto with the Los Angeles Angels in 2023

Los Angeles Angels – No. 9
- Shortstop
- Born: January 31, 2001 (age 25); Miami, Florida, U.S.
- Bats: Right Throws: Right

MLB debut
- April 15, 2023, for the Los Angeles Angels

MLB statistics (through 2026 season)
- Batting average: .244
- Home runs: 85
- Runs batted in: 250
- Stolen bases: 85
- Stats at Baseball Reference

Teams
- Los Angeles Angels (2023–present)

Zachary Adam Neto (born January 31, 2001) is an American professional baseball shortstop for the Los Angeles Angels of Major League Baseball (MLB). He played college baseball for the Campbell Fighting Camels. He was selected by the Angels in the first round of the 2022 MLB draft and made his MLB debut in 2023.

== Early life ==
Zachary Adam Neto was born on January 31, 2001, in Miami, Florida, as one of three children in a working-class Cuban American family. His father, Joaquin, is a mailman while his mother, Magali, is an AT&T employee. Neto grew up as a Miami Marlins fan and learned baseball from his father.

Neto began high school at Doral Academy Preparatory School but left after two weeks. He later enrolled at Miami Coral Park Senior High School. Neto posted a career .407 batting average and was selected to three All-District teams at Coral Park but did not receive significant college scouting due in part to the high leg kick in his swing mechanics. He went unselected in the 2019 Major League Baseball draft and did not receive an athletic scholarship offer from any Power Five university. Neto partook in college bus tours organized by Lazaro Llanes, a local scout, where he was first introduced to Campbell University. Prior to his senior year in high school, Neto committed to play college baseball for the Campbell Fighting Camels.

== College career ==
=== 2020 ===
Neto honored his commitment to attend Campbell and enrolled for fall 2019. He arrived on campus at 5 feet 10 inches (1.78 m) tall and 160 pounds (73 kg) and began eating six meals a day at the school's cafeteria to aid in his new weight training regimen.

He began the 2020 season recovering from a cyst removal surgery on his right hand. Campbell intended to use Neto as a two-way player but he appeared in only four games (including one as a pitcher) before the remainder of the season was canceled in response to the COVID-19 pandemic. That summer, he played in the South Florida Collegiate Baseball League with the Delray Beach Lightning, where he batted .439 with six home runs and 32 RBIs in 40 games and posted a 4.50 ERA in 10 pitching appearances.

=== 2021 ===
In 2021, Neto batted .405 with 12 home runs, 58 RBIs, 17 doubles, and 12 stolen bases over 44 starts at shortstop. He primarily pitched out of the bullpen, going 4–0 with a 3.43 ERA and 16 strikeouts across 21 innings in 11 appearances (one start).

Following the season, he was named the Big South Conference Player of the Year, first-team all-Big South, and received All-American selections from several organizations, including second-team from the National Collegiate Baseball Writers Association (NCBWA).

Following the season's end, he played in the Cape Cod Baseball League with the Brewster Whitecaps. During his time there, he sprained his ankle during a play and was released by the team due to the injury; however, he ultimately rejoined the roster before the end of the season, considered a rare occurrence. He finished the summer season batting .304 with three home runs and 10 RBIs in 16 games.

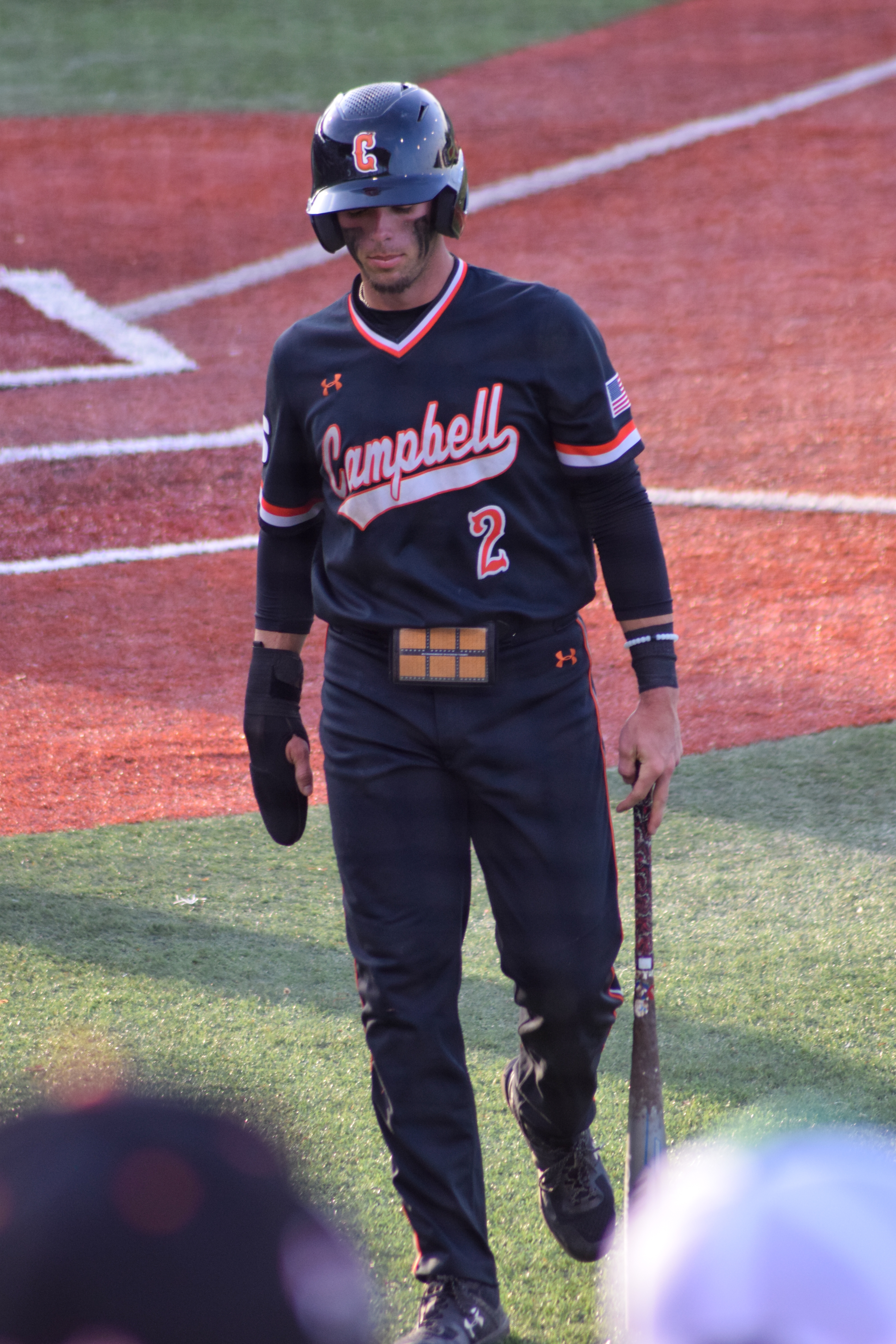
Neto with Campbell in 2022

=== 2022 ===
Prior to the 2022 season, Neto was named to the watchlist for the Golden Spikes Award, given annually to the best amateur baseball player in the country. Neto finished the regular season batting .407 with 15 home runs and 50 RBIs over 53 games. He led Campbell to Big South regular season and tournament championships as well as a berth to the 2022 NCAA tournament, winning the Big South tournament MVP in the process. He was later named Big South Player of the Year and first-team all-Big South for the second consecutive season. He was also named to several All-American teams, including first-team from Perfect Game and second-team from the Collegiate Baseball Newspaper and D1Baseball.

Neto entered the 2022 Major League Baseball draft with media consideration as one of its top prospects. MLB.com and The Sporting News ranked him 17th on their top prospect lists while Keith Law of The Athletic ranked him 9th. He participated in the MLB Draft Combine at Petco Park in San Diego in June 2022.

== Professional career ==
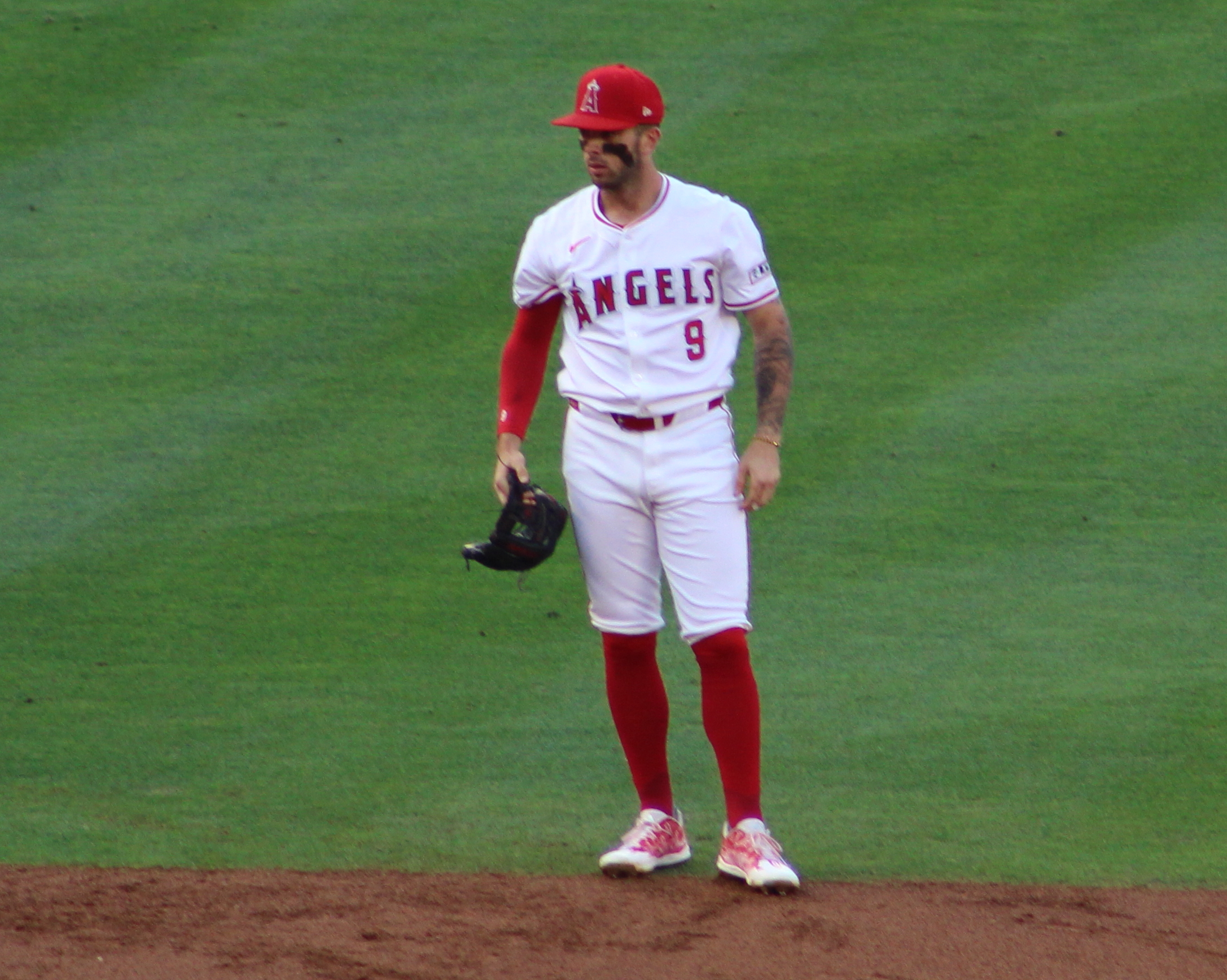
Neto in 2024

=== Los Angeles Angels ===
==== Draft and Minor Leagues ====
The Los Angeles Angels selected Neto in the first round with the 13th overall selection of the 2022 Major League Baseball draft. The selection made him the highest draft pick in Campbell baseball history. He signed with the team for $3.5 million.

Neto was initially assigned to the Tri-City Dust Devils of the High-A Northwest League to begin his professional career. In seven games with the team, he batted .200 with one home run and four RBIs. On August 9, he was promoted to the Rocket City Trash Pandas of the Double-A Southern League. During a re-rank of the MLB.com Angels top 30 prospect list in mid-August, Neto was listed as the second-best prospect in the team's farm system, only behind trade deadline acquisition Logan O'Hoppe.

Over 30 games with Rocket City, he batted .320 with four home runs and 23 RBIs. Between the two teams, he finished the 2022 season batting .299 with five home runs, 27 RBIs, and five stolen bases in 37 games.

==== 2023: MLB debut ====
Neto returned to Rocket City to open the 2023 season. He hit .444 with 3 home runs and 10 RBIs in 7 games at Double-A.

On April 15, 2023, Neto was selected to the 40-man roster and promoted to the major leagues for the first time, making him the first member of the 2022 MLB draft class to debut. A day later, Neto picked up his first hit, a single into left field, in which he also eventually scored on. Neto was hit by a pitch seven times in his first 15 major league games, an MLB modern era record. (Note: The "modern era" of Major League Baseball is generally defined as beginning in 1901.) On May 9, he hit his first major league home run, a solo shot off Houston Astros pitcher Framber Valdez. On June 12, he had his first career multi-home run game in a 9–4 win over the Seattle Mariners.

On June 14, Neto was sidelined after describing the feeling of a cramp during pregame warmups. The next day, he was placed on the injured list with an oblique strain. On August, he was named MLBPAA Angels Heart and Hustle Award for the first time. On August 4, he was placed on the 10-day injured list with low back inflammation, and was activated on September 10.

==== 2024: 1st 20–20 season ====
Neto started 2024 with the Angels. On August 7, he hit his first career grand slam and collected 6 RBIs in an 8–2 win over the New York Yankees at doubleheader game 2, becoming the first visiting shortstop to have a 6 RBI game at Yankee Stadium.

On August 30, he hit 20th home run of the season against the Detroit Tigers, tying him for the Angels' single-season home run record by a shortstop with Jim Fregosi. Also, simultaneously he achieved 20 home runs and 20 stolen bases, joining Mike Trout as the only Angels with 20–20 seasons before age 24, becoming the first infielder in franchise history to record a 20–20 season.

Neto played in 155 games for the Angels that year, slashing .249/.318/.443 with 23 home runs, 77 RBI, and 30 stolen bases. On November 8, 2024, it was announced that Neto had undergone shoulder surgery to repair an injury he had suffered in the final week of the season.

==== 2025: 2nd 20–20 season ====
Neto missed the opening of 2025 season due to a right shoulder surgery. On April, he began a rehab assignment with Triple-A before returning the Majors.

Neto made his return to the Angels on April 18, delivering an RBI double in his first at-bat. On June 2, The Angels launched three home runs including Neto's lead off shot in the 1st inning against the Boston Red sox, marking the first time a visiting club hit three home runs in the 1st innings at Fenway Park. On July 25, he hit his first career walk-off hit in the bottom of the 10th inning in a 3–2 win over the Mariners. On August, he was named MLBPAA Angels Heart and Hustle Award for the second time. On August 13, in the game against the Los Angeles Dodgers at Angels Stadium, he turned Shohei Ohtani's liner into 8th triple play in club history.

On August 15, Neto hit his 20th home run of the season against the Athletics, achieving 20 home runs and 20 stolen bases in second straight season. He became the 4th player in Angels history with multiple 20/20 seasons, following Mike Trout, Shohei Ohtani and Don Baylor. Also, he became the 6th shortstop in AL history to record multiple 20/20 seasons, following Alan Trammell, Alex Rodriguez, Derek Jeter, Francisco Lindor and Bobby Witt Jr.. On August 18, he was named AL Player of the Week award for the first time, batting .320 with 4 home runs, 8 RBIs and 1.254 OPS.

On September 16, Neto was placed on the 10-day injured list due to a hit by pitch on his left hand on August 20, ending the season. he slashed .257/.319/.474 with 26 home runs, 29 doubles, 26 stolen bases and 62 RBIs in 128 games, leading the Angels in Wins Above Replacement for a second straight year with 5.0 WAR according to baseball-reference.com.

==== 2026: 3rd 20–20 season ====
Neto was named to the Angel's 2026 Opening Day roster. On May 18, Neto hit a walk-off home run in the bottom of the ninth inning against the Athletics to win the game after the Angels had been no-hit by J. T. Ginn over the first eight innings. On August 20, he recorded a career high seven RBIs in an 18–3 win over the Houston Astros. On August 24, he was named to the AL Player of the Week for batting .500 (14-28) with two home runs, four doubles, a triple and two stolen bases.

On September 13, he hit his 26th home run of the season, setting the new Angels single-season home run record by a shortstop. In the same game, he stole a base in the top of the eighth, achieving 20 home runs and 20 stolen bases in third straight season. Additionally, he became the third player in Angels history for having three seasons with 20-plus home runs, 20-plus stolen bases and 20-plus doubles, following Don Baylor and Mike Trout.

Overall in 2026, Neto played 157 games with a .239 batting average, 27 home runs, and 77 RBI. He struck out 215 times, while lowering his strikeout percentage from 31.4% in the first half of the season to 29.2% afterwards. After the season, Neto earned a nomination for the Silver Slugger Award at the American League shortstop position, and his 27 home runs on the season led all nominees at the position.
