= 2026 Los Angeles Angels season =

2026 Los Angeles Angels
- League: American League
- Division: West
- Ballpark: Angel Stadium
- City: Anaheim, California
- Record: 62–100 (.383)
- Divisional place: 5th
- Owner: Arte Moreno
- General managers: Perry Minasian (through June 26); John Mozeliak (interim)
- Manager: Kurt Suzuki
- Television: FanDuel Sports Network West (now ABTV)
- Radio: KLAA (AM 830); KSPN (AM 710); Angels Radio Network; Spanish: KWKW (AM 1330)
- Stats: ESPN.com; Baseball Reference

The 2026 Los Angeles Angels season was the 66th season of the Angels franchise in the American League, the 61st in Anaheim, their 61st season playing their home games at Angel Stadium, and the 23rd and final season under the ownership of Arte Moreno. The Angels failed to improve upon their 72–90 record from the previous season and missed the playoffs for the 12th consecutive year, extending the longest active playoff drought in Major League Baseball.

On September 1, billionaire Stan Kroenke’s Kroenke Sports & Entertainment announced its agreement to acquire majority ownership of the Los Angeles Angels, ending Arte Moreno's 25 years as the team's owner. The deal is expected to close in early 2027.

On September 27, the Angels lost their final game of the season against the Seattle Mariners to finish their 2026 season with a franchise-worst 62–100 record, losing their status as the only active franchise to never have a 100–loss season.

== Offseason ==
=== Coaching Changes ===
On September 30, 2025, the Los Angeles Angels announced that Ron Washington and Ray Montgomery would not return as the team's manager in 2026 season. As the next manager, the Angels searched for several candidates, including former Angels' player Albert Pujols, Torii Hunter, Kurt Suzuki and more. On October 21, the Angels announced they hired Suzuki as team's next manager.

On October 31, the Angels hired Mike Maddux, the former Texas Rangers' pitching coach, as their new pitching coach. On November 11, the Angels hired John Gibbons as their new bench coach, and hired Adam Eaton as their new outfield instructor. On November 12, the Angels hired Max Stassi, the former Angels' catcher, as their new catching coach. Also, the Angels hired Triple-A Salt Lake Bees manager Keith Johnson as their new third-base coach and Double-A Rocket City Trash Pandas manager Andy Schatzley as their new infield coach.

On November 21, the Angels hired Brady Anderson, a former three-time All-Star for Baltimore Orioles, as their new hitting coach and John Mabry as their new assistant hitting coach. On December 8, the Angels hired Darryl Scott as their new assistant pitching coach, Dom Chiti as their new bullpen coach, and Derek Florko as their new third hitting coach.

=== Transactions ===
==== September 2025 ====
September 29	INF Scott Kingery elected free agency

==== October ====
October 2	P José Quijada elected free agency
October 14	C Chad Wallach elected free agency
October 22	INF Carter Kieboom elected free agency
October 22	P Connor Brogdon elected free agency
October 22	P Carson Fulmer elected free agency
October 22	Milwaukee Brewers claimed P Sammy Peralta off waivers from Los Angeles Angels

==== November ====
November 2	P Andrew Chafin elected free agency
November 2	P José Ureña elected free agency
November 2	P Hunter Strickland elected free agency
November 2	P Tyler Anderson elected free agency
November 2	INF Yoán Moncada elected free agency
November 2	P Kenley Jansen elected free agency
November 2	OF Chris Taylor elected free agency
November 2	INF Luis Rengifo elected free agency
November 2	P Luis García elected free agency
November 2	P Kyle Hendricks elected free agency
November 6	Los Angeles Angels claimed P Cody Laweryson off waivers from Minnesota Twins
November 18	Los Angeles Angels traded OF Taylor Ward to Baltimore Orioles in exchange for P Grayson Rodriguez
November 18	Los Angeles Angels selected the contract of P Walbert Ureña from Triple-A Salt Lake Bees
November 21	C Sebastián Rivero elected free agency (signed to a minor league contract on December 3)
November 21	OF Gustavo Campero elected free agency (signed to a minor league contract on November 26)

==== December ====
December 2	Los Angeles Angels signed free agent P Alek Manoah to a 1-year, $1.95 million contract
December 9	Boston Red Sox traded IF Vaughn Grissom to Los Angeles Angels in exchange for OF Isaiah Jackson
December 17	Los Angeles Angels signed free agent P Drew Pomeranz to a 1-year, $4 million contract
December 17	Los Angeles Angels signed free agent P Jordan Romano to a 1-year, $2 million contract

==== January 2026 ====
January 6	Los Angeles Angels signed free agent P Kirby Yates to a 1-year, $5 million contract
January 7	Los Angeles Angels claimed OF Wade Meckler off waivers from San Francisco Giants
January 16	In 3-team trade, Los Angeles Angels acquired OF Josh Lowe from Tampa Bay Rays, and traded P Brock Burke to Cincinnati Reds
January 27	Los Angeles Angels claimed P Osvaldo Bido off waivers from Miami Marlins
January 28	Los Angeles Angels claimed OF Kaleb Ort off waivers from New York Yankees
January 28	Los Angeles Angels designated Wade Meckler for assignment (sent outright to Salt Lake Bees on February 2)
January 29	New York Yankees traded P Jayvien Sandridge to Los Angeles Angels in exchange for cash
January 29	Los Angeles Angels designated P Osvaldo Bido for assignment (claimed off waivers by New York Yankees on February 5)

==== February ====
February 2	Los Angeles Angels designated P Cody Laweryson for assignment (released on February 6)
February 2	Los Angeles Angels signed free agent 3B Yoán Moncada to a 1-year, $4 million contract
February 6	Los Angeles Angels signed free agent P Brent Suter to a 1-year, $1.25 million contract
February 6	Los Angeles Angels designated P Kaleb Ort for assignment (sent outright to Salt Lake Bees on February 9)

==== March ====
March 24	Los Angeles Angels designated P Jayvien Sandridge for assignment.
March 25	Los Angeles Angels selected the contract of 2B Adam Frazier from Triple-A Salt Lake Bees
March 25	Los Angeles Angels selected the contract of 3B Jeimer Candelario from Triple-A Salt Lake Bees
March 25	Los Angeles Angels signed free agent P Joey Lucchesi

== Spring Training ==
On February 4, 2026, the Angels announced 27 non-roster players invited to 2026 Spring Training. Below are the non-roster spring training. Players who were added to the team's Opening Day roster are in Bold.

Los Angeles Angels 2026 Spring Training non-roster invitees

Player	Position	2025 team(s)
Shaun Anderson	Pitcher	Los Angeles Angels
Tyler Bremner	Pitcher	Nothing (college baseball)
Gustavo Campero	Outfielder	Los Angeles Angels
**Jeimer Candelario**	Infielder	Cincinnati Reds
Chris Cortez	Pitcher	Los Angeles Angels (A+)
Juan Flores	Catcher	Los Angeles Angels (A+)
**Adam Frazier**	Infielder	Pittsburgh Pirates/Kansas City Royals
Jose Gonzalez	Pitcher	Texas Rangers (AA/A+)
Austin Gordon	Pitcher	Los Angeles Angels (A+)
Joel Hurtado	Pitcher	Los Angeles Angels (AAA/AA)
Niko Kavadas	Infielder	Los Angeles Angels
George Klassen	Pitcher	Los Angeles Angels (AAA/AA)
Nick Madrigal	Infielder	New York Mets
Trey Mancini	Infielder	Arizona Diamondbacks
Omar Martinez	Catcher	New York Yankees (AAA/AA/A+)
Wade Meckler	Outfielder	San Francisco Giants (AAA)
Samy Natera Jr.	Pitcher	Los Angeles Angels (AAA/AA)
Kaleb Ort	Pitcher	Houston Astros
Ángel Perdomo	Pitcher	Athletics
Marlon Quintero	Catcher	Los Angeles Angels (A/Rk)
Nelson Rada	Outfielder	Los Angeles Angels (AAA/AA)
Sebastián Rivero	Catcher	Los Angeles Angels
Raudi Rodriguez	Outfielder	Los Angeles Angels (A)
Yolmer Sánchez	Infielder	Los Angeles Angels (AAA)
Nick Sandlin	Pitcher	Toronto Blue Jays
Tayler Saucedo	Pitcher	Seattle Mariners
Chase Shores	Pitcher	Nothing (college baseball)
Jose Siri	Outfielder	New York Mets
Nate Snead	Pitcher	Nothing (college baseball)
Hunter Strickland	Pitcher	Los Angeles Angels
Chris Taylor	Outfielder	Los Angeles Dodgers/Los Angeles Angels
Donovan Walton	Infielder	Philadelphia Phillies
Huascar Ynoa	Pitcher	Leones de Yucatán/Conspiradores de Querétaro

== Regular season ==
=== Season standings ===
==== American League West ====
AL West
Team	W	L	Pct.	GB	Home	Road
Houston Astros	81	81	.500	—	39‍–‍42	42‍–‍39
Texas Rangers	80	82	.494	1	45‍–‍36	35‍–‍46
Seattle Mariners	76	86	.469	5	43‍–‍38	33‍–‍48
Athletics	64	98	.395	17	32‍–‍49	32‍–‍49
Los Angeles Angels	62	100	.383	19	34‍–‍47	28‍–‍53

==== American League Wild Card ====
Division leaders
Team	W	L	Pct.
Tampa Bay Rays	98	64	.605
Cleveland Guardians	85	77	.525
Houston Astros	81	81	.500

Wild Card teams (Top 3 teams qualify for postseason)
Team	W	L	Pct.	GB
New York Yankees	93	68	.578	+9½
Boston Red Sox	87	75	.537	+3
Chicago White Sox	84	78	.519	—
Texas Rangers	80	82	.494	4
Baltimore Orioles	79	82	.491	4½
Toronto Blue Jays	79	83	.488	5
Minnesota Twins	77	85	.475	7
Detroit Tigers	76	86	.469	8
Seattle Mariners	76	86	.469	8
Kansas City Royals	69	93	.426	15
Athletics	64	98	.395	20
Los Angeles Angels	62	100	.383	22

==== Record against opponents ====
2026 American League record Source: MLB Standings Grid – 2026
Team	ATH	BAL	BOS	CWS	CLE	DET	HOU	KC	LAA	MIN	NYY	SEA	TB	TEX	TOR	NL
Athletics	—	2–4	3–4	1–5	1–5	0–6	6–7	2–5	8–5	3–3	3–3	7–6	0–6	7–6	2–4	19–29
Baltimore	4–2	—	4–9	4–2	3–4	4–2	5–1	5–1	3–3	3–3	3–9	3–4	8–5	2–4	7–6	21–27
Boston	4–3	9–4	—	6–0	3–3	5–2	1–5	5–1	4–2	1–5	6–7	3–3	6–7	3–3	4–9	27–21
Chicago	5–1	2–4	0–6	—	7–6	9–4	2–5	9–4	4–2	8–5	3–4	3–3	2–4	4–2	5–1	21–27
Cleveland	5–1	4–3	3–3	6–7	—	10–3	2–4	7–6	6–0	6–7	2–4	4–3	1–5	2–4	2–4	25–23
Detroit	6–0	2–4	2–5	4–9	3–10	—	2–5	6–7	3–3	5–8	4–2	4–2	4–2	4–2	3–3	24–24
Houston	7–6	1–5	5–1	5–2	4–2	5–2	—	4–2	7–6	2–4	3–3	3–10	2–4	9–4	3–3	21–27
Kansas City	5–2	1–5	1–5	4–9	6–7	7–6	2–4	—	5–1	8–5	0–6	5–1	2–5	1–5	3–3	19–29
Los Angeles	5–8	3–3	2–4	2–4	0–6	3–3	6–7	1–5	—	3–4	3–4	6–7	3–3	8–5	2–4	15–33
Minnesota	3–3	3–3	5–1	5–8	7–6	8–5	4–2	5–8	4–3	—	3–3	2–4	1–5	5–1	4–3	18–30
New York	3–3	9–3	7–6	4–3	4–2	2–4	3–3	6–0	4–3	3–3	—	4–2	6–7	4–2	7–6	27–21
Seattle	6–7	4–3	3–3	3–3	3–4	2–4	10–3	1–5	7–6	4–2	2–4	—	1–5	5–8	2–4	23–25
Tampa Bay	6–0	5–8	7–6	4–2	5–1	2–4	4–2	5–2	3–3	5–1	7–6	5–1	—	4–3	9–4	27–21
Texas	6–7	4–2	3–3	2–4	4–2	2–4	4–9	5–1	5–8	1–5	2–4	8–5	3–4	—	6–1	25–23
Toronto	4–2	6–7	9–4	1–5	4–2	3–3	3–3	3–3	4–2	3–4	6–7	4–2	4–9	1–6	—	24–24

Updated with the results of all games through September 27, 2026.

=== Opening day lineup ===
Order	No.	Player	Pos.
Batters
1	9	Zach Neto	SS
2	27	Mike Trout	CF
3	18	Nolan Schanuel	1B
4	12	Jorge Soler	DH
5	10	Yoán Moncada	3B
6	7	Jo Adell	RF
7	3	Josh Lowe	LF
8	14	Logan O'Hoppe	C
9	2	Oswald Peraza	2B
Starting pitcher
—	59	José Soriano	

=== Game log ===
The Angels opened the 2026 season on the road at the Astros.

Legend
	Angels win
	Angels loss
	All-Star Game
	Postponement
	Eliminated from playoff race
**Bold**	Angels team member

2026 Game Log: 62–100 (Home: 34–47; Road: 28–53)
March/April: 12–20 (Home: 5–7; Road: 7–13)

#	Date	Opponent	Score	Win	Loss	Save	Attendance	Record	Streak
1	March 26	@ Astros	3–0	**Soriano** (1–0)	Blubaugh (0–1)	**Romano** (1)	41,329	1–0	W1
2	March 27	@ Astros	6–2	**Zeferjahn** (1–0)	Burrows (0–1)	—	30,788	2–0	W2
3	March 28	@ Astros	9–11	Teng (1–0)	**Ureña** (0–1)	—	30,740	2–1	L1
4	March 29	@ Astros	7–9	Blubaugh (1–1)	**Pomeranz** (0–1)	King (1)	30,848	2–2	L2
5	March 30	@ Cubs	2–7	Cabrera (1–0)	**Johnson** (0–1)	Rea (1)	36,702	2–3	L3
6	March 31	@ Cubs	2–0	**Soriano** (2–0)	Maton (0–1)	**Romano** (2)	26,288	3–3	W1
7	April 1	@ Cubs	2–6	Boyd (1–1)	**Kikuchi** (0–1)	—	25,125	3–4	L1
8	April 3	Mariners	1–3 (10)	Muñoz (1–1)	**Suter** (0–1)	Speier (1)	44,931	3–5	L2
9	April 4	Mariners	1–0	**Kochanowicz** (1–0)	Hancock (1–1)	**Romano** (3)	44,084	4–5	W1
10	April 5	Mariners	8–7 (11)	**Anderson** (1–0)	Speier (0–2)	—	27,712	5–5	W2
11	April 6	Braves	6–2	**Soriano** (3–0)	Sale (2–1)	**Romano** (4)	25,471	6–5	W3
12	April 7	Braves	2–7	Kinley (1–0)	**Kikuchi** (0–2)	Iglesias (2)	40,450	6–6	L1
13	April 8	Braves	2–8	Holmes (1–1)	**Detmers** (0–1)	—	21,375	6–7	L2
14	April 10	@ Reds	10–2	**Kochanowicz** (2–0)	Burns (1–1)	—	22,357	7–7	W1
15	April 11	@ Reds	3–7	Johnson (1–1)	**Klassen** (0–1)	—	32,554	7–8	L1
16	April 12	@ Reds	9–6	**Soriano** (4–0)	Abbott (0–2)	—	20,311	8–8	W1
17	April 13	@ Yankees	10–11	Blackburn (1–1)	**Romano** (0–1)	—	35,789	8–9	L1
18	April 14	@ Yankees	7–1	**Detmers** (1–1)	Weathers (0–2)	—	37,792	9–9	W1
19	April 15	@ Yankees	4–5	Bednar (1–2)	**Romano** (0–2)	—	41,019	9–10	L1
20	April 16	@ Yankees	11–4	**Aldegheri** (1–0)	Fried (2–1)	—	38,424	10–10	W1
21	April 17	Padres	8–0	**Soriano** (5–0)	Waldron (0–1)	—	44,551	11–10	W2
22	April 18	Padres	1–4	Morejón (2–0)	**Zeferjahn** (1–1)	Miller (7)	44,279	11–11	L1
23	April 19	Padres	1–2	King (3–1)	**Ureña** (0–2)	Miller (8)	44,560	11–12	L2
24	April 20	Blue Jays	2–5	Cease (1–0)	**Detmers** (1–2)	Hoffman (3)	37,897	11–13	L3
25	April 21	Blue Jays	2–4	Fluharty (1–0)	**Pomeranz** (0–2)	Varland (1)	28,641	11–14	L4
26	April 22	Blue Jays	7–3	**Suter** (1–1)	Nance (0–2)	—	25,306	12–14	W1
27	April 24	@ Royals	3–6	Cameron (2–1)	**Kikuchi** (0–3)	Erceg (6)	19,079	12–15	L1
28	April 25	@ Royals	1–12	Ragans (1–4)	**Ureña** (0–3)	—	22,152	12–16	L2
29	April 26	@ Royals	9–11 (10)	Erceg (2–1)	**Lucchesi** (0–1)	—	11,579	12–17	L3
30	April 27	@ White Sox	7–8	Bido (2–0)	**Sandlin** (0–1)	Hudson (1)	10,193	12–18	L4
31	April 28	@ White Sox	2–5	Martin (4–1)	**Soriano** (5–1)	Domínguez (7)	11,857	12–19	L5
32	April 29	@ White Sox	2–3 (10)	Domínguez (2–3)	Pomeranz (0–3)	—	15,901	12–20	L6

May: 11–17 (Home: 7–9; Road: 4–8)

#	Date	Opponent	Score	Win	Loss	Save	Attendance	Record	Streak
33	May 1	Mets	3–4	Brazobán (2–0)	**Fermín** (0–1)	Williams (3)	43,959	12–21	L7
34	May 2	Mets	4–3 (10)	**Zeferjahn** (2–1)	Warren (0–1)	—	42,788	13–21	W1
35	May 3	Mets	1–5	Holmes (4–2)	**Kochanowicz** (2–1)	—	41,614	13–22	L1
36	May 4	White Sox	0–6	Martin (5–1)	**Soriano** (5–2)	—	26,262	13–23	L2
37	May 5	White Sox	4–3	**Fermín** (1–1)	Fedde (0–4)	**Zeferjahn** (1)	26,892	14–23	W1
38	May 6	White Sox	8–2	**Ureña** (1–3)	Schultz (2–2)	—	23,338	15–23	W2
39	May 8	@ Blue Jays	0–2	Cease (3–1)	**Detmers** (1–3)	Varland (5)	41,923	15–24	L1
40	May 9	@ Blue Jays	1–14	Fluharty (2–0)	**Kochanowicz** (2–2)	—	41,461	15–25	L2
41	May 10	@ Blue Jays	6–1	**Soriano** (6–2)	Lauer (1–5)	—	40,977	16–25	W1
42	May 11	@ Guardians	2–7	Cantillo (3–1)	**Suter** (1–2)	—	15,492	16–26	L1
43	May 12	@ Guardians	2–3	Gaddis (1–1)	**Ureña** (1–4)	Smith (12)	16,355	16–27	L2
44	May 13	@ Guardians	2–4	Messick (5–1)	**Detmers** (1–4)	Smith (13)	21,142	16–28	L3
45	May 15	Dodgers	0–6	Henriquez (2–0)	**Kochanowicz** (2–3)	—	44,887	16–29	L4
46	May 16	Dodgers	2–15	Wrobleski (6–1)	**Soriano** (6–3)	—	44,841	16–30	L5
47	May 17	Dodgers	1–10	Sasaki (2–3)	**Rodriguez** (0–1)	—	44,809	16–31	L6
48	May 18	Athletics	2–1	**Silseth** (1–0)	Ginn (2–2)	—	25,776	17–31	W1
49	May 19	Athletics	6–14	Sterner (2–3)	**Detmers** (1–5)	—	23,803	17–32	L1
50	May 20	Athletics	5–6 (10)	Barlow (1–0)	**Silseth** (1–1)	Harris (4)	24,588	17–33	L2
51	May 21	Athletics	2–3 (10)	Kuhnel (1–1)	**Zeferjahn** (2–2)	Leiter Jr. (4)	25,848	17–34	L3
52	May 22	Rangers	9–6	**Rodriguez** (1–1)	deGrom (3–4)	—	32,488	18–34	W1
53	May 23	Rangers	5–2	**Ureña** (2–4)	Eovaldi (5–5)	**Yates** (1)	31,860	19–34	W2
54	May 24	Rangers	2–1	**Bachman** (1–0)	Collyer (1–1)	—	36,903	20–34	W3
55	May 26	@ Tigers	10–6	**Fermín** (2–1)	Vest (1–4)	—	21,954	21–34	W4
56	May 27	@ Tigers	0–4	Anderson (2–1)	**Soriano** (6–4)	—	27,692	21–35	L1
57	May 28	@ Tigers	7–1	**Rodriguez** (2–1)	Flaherty (0–7)	—	29,670	22–35	W1
58	May 29	@ Rays	5–8	Martinez (5–1)	**Zeferjahn** (2–3)	Baker (15)	18,706	22–36	L1
59	May 30	@ Rays	14–3	**Detmers** (2–5)	Rasmussen (4–2)	—	22,480	23–36	W1
60	May 31	@ Rays	2–5	McClanahan (6–2)	**Kochanowicz** (2–4)	Baker (16)	16,589	23–37	L1

June: 13–14 (Home: 9–6; Road: 4–8)

#	Date	Opponent	Score	Win	Loss	Save	Attendance	Record	Streak
61	June 1	Rockies	8–9	Senzatela (5–0)	**Yates** (0–1)	—	27,165	23–38	L2
62	June 2	Rockies	2–8	Sugano (5–4)	**Rodriguez** (2–2)	—	26,426	23–39	L3
63	June 3	Rockies	11–4	**Ureña** (3–4)	Lorenzen (2–8)	—	26,554	24–39	W1
64	June 5	@ Dodgers	0–1	Treinen (3–1)	**Yates** (0–2)	—	46,850	24–40	L1
65	June 6	@ Dodgers	2–9	Yamamoto (6–4)	**Kochanowicz** (2–5)	—	53,448	24–41	L2
66	June 7	@ Dodgers	13–5	**Soriano** (7–4)	Sheehan (3–3)	—	49,535	25–41	W1
67	June 8	Astros	4–5 (10)	Hader (1–0)	**Aldegheri** (1–1)	Abreu (4)	25,474	25–42	L1
68	June 9	Astros	10–1	**Ureña** (4–4)	Teng (3–5)	—	24,767	26–42	W1
69	June 10	Astros	3–2 (10)	**Zeferjahn** (3–3)	Abreu (2–3)	—	25,179	27–42	W2
70	June 12	Rays	4–3	**Aldegheri** (2–1)	McClanahan (6–4)	**Zeferjahn** (2)	37,023	28–42	W3
71	June 13	Rays	8–0	**Soriano** (8–4)	Jax (1–5)	—	34,030	29–42	W4
72	June 14	Rays	3–8	Kelly (4–2)	**Bachman** (1–1)	—	34,048	29–43	L1
73	June 15	@ Diamondbacks	3–4	Nelson (3–5)	**Ureña** (4–5)	Sewald (18)	29,457	29–44	L2
74	June 16	@ Diamondbacks	7–0	**Detmers** (3–5)	Kelly (5–6)	—	36,905	30–44	W1
75	June 17	@ Diamondbacks	1–8	Rodríguez (6–2)	**Aldegheri** (2–2)	—	28,433	30–45	L1
76	June 18	@ Athletics	0–5	Jump (3–1)	**Johnson** (0–2)	—	9,245	30–46	L2
77	June 19	@ Athletics	11–12 (10)	Alvarado (3–1)	**Yates** (0–3)	—	9,687	30–47	L3
78	June 20	@ Athletics	7–0	**Ureña** (5–5)	Ginn (5–4)	—	11,261	31–47	W1
79	June 21	@ Athletics	9–7	**Silseth** (2–1)	Alvarado (3–2)	**Bachman** (1)	12,377	32–47	W2
80	June 22	Orioles	1–6	Bradish (5–7)	**Aldegheri** (2–3)	—	28,431	32–48	L1
81	June 23	Orioles	5–1	**Johnson** (1–2)	Baz (4–8)	—	31,569	33–48	W1
82	June 24	Orioles	7–6 (10)	**Silseth** (3–1)	Akin (0–1)	—	27,585	34–48	W2
83	June 26	Athletics	3–9	Ginn (6–4)	**Ureña** (5–6)	—	29,089	34–49	L1
84	June 27	Athletics	5–2	**Zeferjahn** (4–3)	Hartlieb (1–1)	**Yates** (2)	37,064	35–49	W1
85	June 28	Athletics	4–1	**Aldegheri** (3–3)	Civale (5-5)	**Natera Jr.** (1)	32,557	36–49	W2
86	June 29	@ Mariners	2–6	Kirby (7–7)	**Johnson** (1–3)	—	37,100	36–50	L1
87	June 30	@ Mariners	3–8	Woo (7–6)	**Soriano** (8–5)	—	32,372	36–51	L2

July: 6–17 (Home: 3–10; Road: 3–7)

#	Date	Opponent	Score	Win	Loss	Save	Attendance	Record	Streak
88	July 2	@ Mariners	0–1	Miller (4–2)	**Ureña** (5–7)	Muñoz (16)	36,019	36–52	L3
89	July 3	Red Sox	2–5	Bennett (3–3)	**Detmers** (3–6)	Chapman (17)	43,747	36–53	L4
90	July 4	Red Sox	1–8	Gray (10–1)	**Aldegheri** (3–4)	—	43,599	36–54	L5
91	July 5	Red Sox	5–7	Suárez (5–3)	**Johnson** (1–4)	Chapman (18)	35,992	36–55	L6
92	July 7	@ Rangers	3–8	Gray (4–0)	**Bachman** (1–2)	—	23,816	36–56	L7
93	July 8	@ Rangers	13–1	**Natera Jr.** (1–0)	Gore (5–8)	—	23,288	37–56	W1
94	July 9	@ Rangers	6–7	Winn (4–2)	**Yates** (0–4)	—	29,646	37–57	L1
95	July 10	@ Twins	4–3	**Rodriguez** (3–2)	Matthews (4–6)	**Yates** (3)	26,893	38–57	W1
96	July 11	@ Twins	3–5	Nance (2–2)	**Farris** (0–1)	Gómez (11)	21,286	38–58	L1
97	July 12	@ Twins	2–4	Bradley (9–3)	**Soriano** (8–6)	Morris (3)	20,509	38–59	L2
ASG	July 14	AL @ NL	4–0	Cease (1–0)	Sánchez (0–1)	—	43,916	―	―
98	July 17	Tigers	1–2	Montero (6–5)	**Yates** (0–5)	—	29,536	38–60	L3
99	July 18	Tigers	0–7	Skubal (6–5)	**Rodriguez** (3–3)	—	32,003	38–61	L4
100	July 19	Tigers	3–2	**Johnson** (2–4)	Anderson (3–4)	**Zeferjahn** (3)	30,778	39–61	W1
101	July 20	Cardinals	3–2	**Fermín** (3–1)	O'Brien (3–4)	—	29,794	40–61	W2
102	July 21	Cardinals	5–1	**Ureña** (6–7)	Liberatore (5–7)	—	33,151	41–61	W3
103	July 22	Cardinals	0–1	Dobbins (2–1)	**Detmers** (3–7)	O'Brien (26)	25,187	41–62	L1
104	July 24	@ Giants	6–7 (10)	Kilian (3–6)	**Silseth** (3–2)	—	41,559	41–63	L2
105	July 25	@ Giants	2–9	Ray (9–6)	**Johnson** (2–5)	—	39,102	41–64	L3
106	July 26	@ Giants	4–3	**Soriano** (9–6)	Whisenhunt (2–1)	**Farris** (1)	34,111	42–64	W1
107	July 27	Astros	4–6	Javier (1–1)	**Fermín** (3–2)	Hader (13)	30,121	42–65	L1
108	July 28	Astros	2–3	Okert (4–1)	**Farris** (0–2)	Hader (14)	32,051	42–66	L2
109	July 29	Astros	4–7	Wesneski (1–0)	**Farris** (0–3)	Abreu (7)	26,417	42–67	L3
110	July 31	Brewers	2–6	Drohan (6–4)	**Johnson** (2–6)	—	43,720	42–68	L4

August: 11–17 (Home: 6–10; Road: 5–7)

#	Date	Opponent	Score	Win	Loss	Save	Attendance	Record	Streak
111	August 1	Brewers	1–3	Patrick (6–4)	**Natera Jr.** (1–1)	Megill (18)	31,124	42–69	L5
112	August 2	Brewers	3–0	**Ureña** (7–7)	Misiorowski (11–5)	**Zeferjahn** (4)	31,061	43–69	W1
113	August 4	@ Orioles	1–3	Povich (2–1)	**Rodriguez** (3–4)	Canó (2)	18,585	43–70	L1
114	August 5	@ Orioles	2–5	Rogers (7–7)	**Detmers** (3–8)	Kittredge (5)	16,977	43–71	L2
115	August 6	@ Orioles	4–1	**Farris** (1–3)	Young (8–3)	**Natera Jr.** (2)	21,202	44–71	W1
116	August 7	@ Marlins	4–3	**Anderson** (2–0)	Ekness (0–1)	**Fermín** (1)	16,506	45–71	W2
117	August 8	@ Marlins	0–7	Alcántara (13–6)	**Ureña** (7–8)	―	16,045	45–72	L1
118	August 9	@ Marlins	3–12	Petersen (2–2)	**Rodriguez** (3–5)	—	13,215	45–73	L2
119	August 10	Rangers	1–4 (10)	Gray (6–0)	**Murphy** (0–1)	Latz (23)	23,880	45–74	L3
120	August 11	Rangers	3–2	**Fermín** (4–2)	Bradford (0–1)	**Natera Jr.** (3)	23,648	46–74	W1
121	August 12	Rangers	5–2	**Klassen** (1–1)	Ahlstrom (3–1)	**Joyce** (1)	33,733	47–74	W2
122	August 13	Rangers	7–0	**Ureña** (8–8)	deGrom (8–8)	—	24,959	48–74	W3
123	August 14	Royals	6–7	Lange (2–7)	**Saucedo** (0–1)	Cruz (4)	23,139	48–75	L1
124	August 15	Royals	1–0	**Detmers** (4–8)	Pearson (2–1)	**Joyce** (2)	30,002	49–75	W1
125	August 16	Royals	0–3	Cameron (7–8)	**Johnson** (2–7)	—	28,036	49–76	L1
126	August 18	@ Astros	3–1	**Klassen** (2–1)	Javier (1–4)	**Joyce** (3)	22,767	50–76	W1
127	August 19	@ Astros	2–3	Sousa (1–1)	**Ureña** (8–9)	Hader (18)	21,162	50–77	L1
128	August 20	@ Astros	18–3	**Rodriguez** (4–5)	Lambert (8–7)	—	20,934	51–77	W1
129	August 21	@ Rangers	1–2 (10)	Alexander (4–2)	**Joyce** (0–1)	—	29,309	51–78	L1
130	August 22	@ Rangers	3–0	**Johnson** (3–7)	Bradford (0–2)	**Watson** (2)	35,836	52–78	W1
131	August 23	@ Rangers	3–5	Quantrill (6–4)	**Kikuchi** (0–4)	Latz (26)	31,593	52–79	L1
132	August 24	Guardians	2–4	Messick (10–8)	**Klassen** (2–2)	Smith (34)	26,302	52–80	L2
133	August 25	Guardians	6–8 (10)	Sabrowski (5–2)	**Weiman** (0–1)	Smith (35)	26,001	52–81	L3
134	August 26	Guardians	3–4	Gaddis (2–3)	**Watson** (1–1)	Sabrowski (1)	25,161	52–82	L4
135	August 28	Phillies	3–5	McFarlane (4–1)	**Joyce** (0–2)	Bowlan (2)	34,951	52–83	L5
136	August 29	Phillies	2–4 (10)	Durán (2–4)	**Martin** (0–1)	—	38,677	52–84	L6
137	August 30	Phillies	2–5	Wheeler (11–5)	**Kikuchi** (0–5)	Kerkering (2)	31,035	52–85	L7
138	August 31	Yankees	10–1	**Ureña** (9–9)	Rodríguez (0–3)	—	37,613	53–85	W1

September: 9–15 (Home: 4–5; Road: 5–10)

#	Date	Opponent	Score	Win	Loss	Save	Attendance	Record	Streak
139	September 1	Yankees	3–7	Cole (8–7)	**Rodriguez** (4–6)	―	37,678	53–86	L1
140	September 2	Yankees	3–6 (10)	Bednar (7–3)	**Murphy** (0–2)	―	38,372	53–87	L2
141	September 4	@ Pirates	0–1	Jones (3–6)	**Johnson** (3–8)	Montgomery (9)	22,363	53–88	L3
142	September 5	@ Pirates	6–1	**Kikuchi** (1–5)	Ashcraft (14–6)	—	25,541	54–88	W1
143	September 6	@ Pirates	0–1	Skenes (10–11)	**Ureña** (9–10)	Montgomery (10)	25,530	54–89	L1
144	September 7	@ Red Sox	2–5	Bello (6–7)	**Rodriguez** (4–7)	Whitlock (3)	36,787	54–90	L2
145	September 8	@ Red Sox	6–1	**Detmers** (5–8)	Sandoval (1–5)	—	36,028	55–90	W1
146	September 9	@ Red Sox	6–4	**Johnson** (4–8)	Bennett (9–7)	**Joyce** (4)	35,428	56–90	W2
147	September 11	@ Nationals	3–4	Beeter (6–5)	**Natera Jr.** (1–2)	Tolman (2)	17,061	56–91	L1
148	September 12	@ Nationals	5–6 (10)	Sinclair (1–0)	**Fermín** (4–3)	—	25,713	56–92	L2
149	September 13	@ Nationals	5–6	Tolman (1–1)	**Murphy** (0–3)	Sinclair (1)	20,761	56–93	L3
150	September 14	Mariners	6–4	**Detmers** (6–8)	Anderson (1–2)	**Joyce** (5)	28,311	57–93	W1
151	September 15	Mariners	2–1	**Johnson** (5–8)	Gilbert (12–10)	**Watson** (3)	30,906	58–93	W2
152	September 16	Mariners	2–7	Vargas (1–0)	**Kikuchi** (1–6)	—	38,906	58–94	L1
153	September 17	Twins	5–4 (10)	**Weiman** (1–1)	Gómez (2–4)	—	34,251	59–94	W1
154	September 18	Twins	0–3	Prielipp (6–7)	**Rodriguez** (4–8)	Adams (3)	35,237	59–95	L1
155	September 19	Twins	6–5 (11)	**Saucedo** (1–1)	Rogers (6–4)	—	33,726	60–95	W1
156	September 20	Twins	0–8	Kremer (4–5)	**Johnson** (5–9)	Ober (1)	32,240	60–96	L1
157	September 22	@ Athletics	7–9	Medina (6–3)	**Bachman** (1–3)	Harris (16)	7,711	60–97	L2
158	September 23	@ Athletics	3–7	Hartlieb (2–1)	**Ureña** (9–11)	—	7,430	60–98	L3
159	September 24	@ Mariners	6–4	**Rodriguez** (5–8)	Woo (12–10)	**Watson** (4)	31,032	61–98	W1
160	September 25	@ Mariners	7–5	**Detmers** (7–8)	Miller (4–10)	—	40,678	62–98	W2
161	September 26	@ Mariners	4–8	Vargas (3–0)	**Farris** (1–4)	—	40,308	62–99	L1
162	September 27	@ Mariners	3–7	Bazardo (4–4)	**Kikuchi** (1–7)	—	44,761	62–100	L2

=== Detailed record ===
As of September 27, 2026

**American League**
Opponent	Home	Away	Total	Pct.	Runs scored	Runs allowed
**AL East**
Baltimore Orioles	2–1	1–2	3–3	.500	20	22
Boston Red Sox	0–3	2–1	2–4	.333	22	30
New York Yankees	1–2	2–2	3–4	.429	48	35
Tampa Bay Rays	2–1	1–2	3–3	.500	36	27
Toronto Blue Jays	1–2	1–2	2–4	.333	18	29
	**6–9**	**7–9**	**13–18**	**.419**	**144**	**143**
**AL Central**
Chicago White Sox	2–1	0–3	2–4	.333	23	27
Cleveland Guardians	0–3	0–3	0–6	.000	17	30
Detroit Tigers	1–2	2–1	3–3	.500	21	22
Kansas City Royals	1–2	0–3	1–5	.167	20	39
Minnesota Twins	2–2	1–2	3–4	.429	20	32
	**6–10**	**3–12**	**9–22**	**.290**	**101**	**150**
**AL West**
Houston Astros	2–4	4–3	6–7	.462	73	53
**Los Angeles Angels**	—	—	—	—	—	—
Athletics	3–4	2–4	5–8	.385	64	76
Seattle Mariners	4–2	2–5	6–7	.462	45	61
Texas Rangers	6–1	2–4	8–5	.615	61	40
	**15–11**	**10–16**	**25–27**	**.481**	**243**	**230**

**National League**
Opponent	Home	Away	Total	Pct.	Runs scored	Runs allowed
**NL East**
Atlanta Braves	1–2	–	1–2	.333	10	17
Miami Marlins	–	1–2	1–2	.333	7	22
New York Mets	1–2	–	1–2	.333	8	12
Philadelphia Phillies	0–3	–	0–3	.000	7	14
Washington Nationals	–	0–3	0–3	.000	13	16
	**2–7**	**1–5**	**3–12**	**.200**	**45**	**81**
**NL Central**
Chicago Cubs	–	1–2	1–2	.333	6	13
Cincinnati Reds	–	2–1	2–1	.667	22	15
Milwaukee Brewers	1–2	–	1–2	.333	6	9
Pittsburgh Pirates	–	1–2	1–2	.333	6	3
St. Louis Cardinals	2–1	–	2–1	.667	8	4
	**3–3**	**4–5**	**7–8**	**.467**	**48**	**44**
**NL West**
Arizona Diamondbacks	–	1–2	1–2	.333	11	12
Colorado Rockies	1–2	–	1–2	.333	21	21
Los Angeles Dodgers	0–3	1–2	1–5	.167	18	46
San Diego Padres	1–2	–	1–2	.333	10	6
San Francisco Giants	–	1–2	1–2	.333	12	19
	**2–7**	**3–6**	**5–13**	**.278**	**72**	**104**

== Roster ==
2026 Los Angeles Angels
Roster
Pitchers: 61 Samuel Aldegheri; 64 Shaun Anderson; 40 Sam Bachman; 48 Reid Detmers; 70 Mitch Farris; 65 José Fermín; 49 Michael Fulmer; 32 Ryan Johnson; 44 Ben Joyce; 71 Brett Kerry; 16 Yusei Kikuchi; 58 George Klassen; 41 Jack Kochanowicz; 67 Joey Lucchesi; 47 Alek Manoah; 54 Trevor Martin; 72 Luke Murphy; 52 Samy Natera Jr.; 67 Sammy Peralta; 13 Drew Pomeranz; 21 Grayson Rodriguez; 6 Jordan Romano; 52 Nick Sandlin; 55 Tayler Saucedo; 63 Chase Silseth; 59 José Soriano; 37 Brent Suter; 57 Walbert Ureña; 56 Ryan Watson; 68 Blake Weiman; 39 Kirby Yates; 56 Ryan Zeferjahn	Catchers: 13 Moisés Ballesteros; 25 Travis d'Arnaud; 31 Tyler Heineman; 66 Omar Martínez; 14 Logan O'Hoppe; 33 Logan Porter; 38 Sebastián Rivero; Infielders: 46 Jeimer Candelario; 20 Adam Frazier; 5 Vaughn Grissom; 23 Denzer Guzmán; 17 Nick Madrigal; 34 Trey Mancini; 10 Yoán Moncada; 4 Christian Moore; 9 Zach Neto; 2 Oswald Peraza; 18 Nolan Schanuel; 35 Donovan Walton	Outfielders: 7 Jo Adell; 51 Gustavo Campero; 3 Josh Lowe; 53 Wade Meckler; 19 Kyren Paris; 28 Jose Siri; 12 Jorge Soler; 22 Bryce Teodosio; 27 Mike Trout	Manager: 8 Kurt Suzuki; Coaches: 99 Brady Anderson (hitting); 91 Mike Ashman (batting practice pitcher); 93 Jason Brown (bullpen catcher); 95 Tim Buss (staff assistant); 92 Adam Eaton (first base and outfield); 82 Derek Florko (assistant hitting); 85 John Gibbons (bench); 89 Keith Johnson (third base); -- Tim Leveque (interim pitching); 87 John Mabry (assistant hitting); 86 Andy Schatzley (infield); 83 Max Stassi (catching); -- Michael Wuertz (interim bullpen)

== Player stats ==
= Indicates team leader

=== Batting ===
Note: G = Games played; AB = At bats; R = Runs scored; H = Hits; 2B = Doubles; 3B = Triples; HR = Home runs; RBI = Runs batted in; SB = Stolen bases; BB = Walks; AVG = Batting average; SLG = Slugging average

Player	G	AB	R	H	2B	3B	HR	RBI	SB	BB	AVG	RBI
Zach Neto	157	619	102	148	31	5	27	77	24	70	.239	.436
Mike Trout	142	513	86	124	26	0	22	54	11	107	.242	.421
Jo Adell	111	423	46	101	16	1	16	62	3	16	.239	.395
Vaughn Grissom	119	422	47	102	22	0	13	72	1	31	.242	.386
Nolan Schanuel	107	392	43	108	22	0	7	49	1	42	.276	.385
Oswald Peraza	123	341	33	77	12	2	7	25	12	17	.226	.334
Jorge Soler	86	316	36	64	16	1	12	49	0	35	.203	.373
Josh Lowe	114	311	32	65	11	0	12	29	10	25	.209	.360
Wade Meckler	98	300	43	90	15	1	3	27	8	32	.300	.387
Denzer Guzmán	87	283	33	62	9	0	8	33	2	17	.219	.336
Logan O'Hoppe	75	234	20	49	8	0	4	23	0	17	.209	.295
Jose Siri	108	228	36	55	10	0	10	33	9	15	.241	.417
Moisés Ballesteros	45	161	10	32	4	0	3	12	0	13	.199	.280
Christian Moore	38	134	5	25	4	1	2	18	1	11	.187	.276
Adam Frazier	66	129	19	31	9	1	1	13	3	11	.240	.349
Yoán Moncada	41	111	9	21	1	1	3	10	1	17	.189	.297
Tyler Heineman	44	99	9	19	2	1	0	4	1	3	.192	.232
Donovan Walton	32	91	14	29	8	0	3	12	0	5	.319	.505
Travis d'Arnaud	32	76	7	12	3	0	1	3	0	6	.158	.237
Bryce Teodosio	43	70	8	15	2	0	0	6	5	5	.214	.243
Sebastián Rivero	24	53	5	13	2	0	0	8	0	3	.245	.283
Nick Madrigal	15	44	7	12	1	0	0	2	1	7	.273	.295
Jeimer Candelario	7	18	3	2	2	0	0	0	0	1	.111	.222
Kyren Paris	8	15	0	0	0	0	0	0	0	3	.000	.000
Trey Mancini	5	13	1	4	0	1	0	4	0	0	.308	.462
Gustavo Campero	4	11	0	4	1	0	0	2	0	0	.364	.455
Logan Porter	2	4	1	1	1	0	0	0	0	2	.250	.500
Omar Martínez	5	3	0	1	0	0	0	0	0	0	.333	.333
Totals	162	5414	655	1266	238	15	154	627	93	511	.234	.469

=== Pitching ===
Note: W = Wins; L = Losses; ERA = Earned run average; G = Games pitched; GS = Games started; SV = Saves; IP = Innings pitched; H = Hits allowed; R = Runs allowed; ER = Earned runs allowed; BB = Walks allowed; SO = Strikeouts

Player	W	L	ERA	G	GS	SV	IP	H	R	ER	BB	SO
Reid Detmers	7	8	3.36	32	32	0	185.0	144	72	69	48	211
Walbert Ureña	9	11	2.97	29	27	0	148.1	114	56	49	68	142
José Soriano	9	6	3.29	22	22	0	123.0	97	49	45	57	127
Ryan Johnson	5	9	5.04	22	19	0	100.0	96	61	56	43	79
Grayson Rodriguez	5	8	6.02	20	20	0	98.2	111	71	66	43	85
Yusei Kikuchi	1	7	4.92	14	14	0	67.2	74	38	37	30	67
Jack Kochanowicz	2	5	6.19	13	13	0	64.0	65	47	44	36	47
Brent Suter	1	2	4.12	41	3	0	63.1	63	35	29	17	55
Mitch Farris	1	4	4.05	33	0	1	60.0	60	29	27	29	63
José Fermín	4	3	3.86	53	0	1	53.2	49	27	23	25	62
Ryan Zeferjahn	4	3	3.66	45	0	4	51.2	30	23	21	32	75
Sam Bachman	1	3	4.81	44	0	1	48.2	41	27	26	29	49
Chase Silseth	3	2	2.72	47	0	0	39.2	34	14	12	22	48
Sam Aldegheri	3	4	5.08	9	6	0	33.2	31	21	19	17	22
Samy Natera Jr.	1	2	3.13	28	0	3	31.2	22	11	11	13	48
Kirby Yates	0	5	3.95	31	0	3	27.1	20	13	12	12	36
George Klassen	2	2	3.67	6	6	0	27.0	23	13	11	21	24
Drew Pomeranz	0	3	5.01	25	0	0	23.1	25	14	13	12	16
Tayler Saucedo	1	1	2.53	28	0	0	21.1	15	6	6	7	26
Sammy Peralta	0	0	6.20	14	0	0	20.1	31	15	14	7	19
Shaun Anderson	2	0	7.65	12	0	0	20.0	25	19	17	10	17
Luke Murphy	0	3	6.75	22	0	0	20.0	21	17	15	11	20
Blake Weiman	1	1	2.55	18	0	0	17.2	22	8	5	3	16
Ryan Watson	0	1	2.20	18	0	3	16.1	14	5	4	4	22
Ben Joyce	0	2	4.11	16	0	5	15.1	8	9	7	9	18
Brett Kerry	0	0	3.95	3	0	0	13.2	11	6	6	2	12
Nick Sandlin	0	1	11.42	8	0	0	8.2	9	11	11	5	6
Jordan Romano	0	2	10.13	11	0	4	8.0	11	9	9	6	12
Alek Manoah	0	0	9.82	3	0	0	7.1	8	9	8	8	5
Trevor Martin	0	1	4.50	2	0	0	4.0	6	6	2	3	2
Michael Fulmer	0	0	0.00	3	0	0	3.2	2	0	0	2	4
Joey Lucchesi	0	1	13.50	5	0	0	3.1	7	6	5	6	4
Adam Frazier	0	0	18.00	3	0	0	2.0	7	4	4	2	0
Tyler Heineman	0	0	4.50	2	0	0	2.0	2	1	1	0	0
Totals	62	100	4.29	162	162	25	1430.1	1298	752	682	639	1439

=== Team statistical leaders ===
As of September 27, 2026

Batters
Batting average	Home runs	RBIs	OBP	Hits	Stolen bases	Runs scored	Games played
Mike Trout (.242)	Zach Neto (27)	Zach Neto (77)	Mike Trout (.382)	Zach Neto (148)	Zach Neto (24)	Zach Neto (102)	Zach Neto (157)
Pitching
Wins	ERA	Strikeouts	Saves	Holds	WHIP	Innings pitched	Games pitched
José Soriano, Walbert Ureña (9)	Reid Detmers (3.36)	Reid Detmers (211)	Ben Joyce (5)	Sam Bachman (17)	Tayler Saucedo (1.03)	Reid Setmers (185.0)	José Fermín (53)

== Farm system ==
Level	Team	League	Manager
AAA	Salt Lake Bees	Pacific Coast League	Doug Davis
AA	Rocket City Trash Pandas	Southern League	Joe Kruzel
A+	Tri-City Dust Devils	Northwest League	Dann Bilardello
A	Rancho Cucamonga Quakes	California League	Dave Stapleton
Rookie	ACL Angels	Arizona Complex League	Hainley Statia
Foreign Rookie	DSL Angels	Dominican Summer League	Héctor de la Cruz

=== Major League Baseball draft ===
Below are the Angels' picks from 2026 Major League Baseball draft. Players who reached MLB are in bold.

Los Angeles Angels 2026 Draft Picks

Round	Pick	Name	Age	Position	School	Signing bonus
1	12	Jared Grindlinger	17	Outfielder	Huntington Beach High School (CA)	$5,886,800
2	45	Jarren Advincula	21	Second baseman	Georgia Tech	$2,297,500
3	81	Gavin Grahovac	21	Third baseman	Texas A&M University	$1,247,500
4	109	Rylan Lujo	21	Outfielder	University of Georgia	$747,500
5	141	Jaxon Willits	21	Shortstop	University of Oklahoma	$647,500
6	170	Justin Byrd	22	Pitcher	University of Georgia	$397,300
7	199	Ryan Hetzler	21	Pitcher	Auburn University	$322,500
8	229	Garrett Wright	21	Catcher	University of Tennessee	$397,500
9	259	Trevor Hansen	21	Pitcher	University of California, Irvine	$197,500
10	289	Luc Rising	22	Pitcher	Northeastern University	$22,500
11	319	Adam Agresti	21	Catcher	St. John's University	$172,500
12	349	Jacob Sammis	18	Pitcher	Glynn Academy (GA)	$197,500
13	379	Jake Long	21	Outfielder	University of Utah	$150,000
14	409	Tate McGuire	21	Pitcher	University of Arkansas	$150,000
15	439	Cameron Jackson	18	Shortstop	Georgia Premier Academy (GA)	Not signed
16	469	Robert Orloski	21	Pitcher	University of Texas at San Antonio	$150,000
17	499	TJ Grines	22	Second baseman	University of Tennessee at Martin	$50,000
18	529	Greyson Chappel	21	Pitcher	University of Central Missouri	$100,000
19	559	Jack Salmon	22	Outfielder	University of Nevada, Las Vegas	$25,000
20	589	Jake Jackson	22	Outfielder	San Diego State University	$150,000

=== Minor League Baseball awards ===
Prospects of the Year by MLB Pipeline

Outfielder Hayden Alvarez (High-A / Single-A)
Starting pitcher Tyler Bremner (Double-A / High-A)

Breakout Prospect of the Year by MLB Pipeline

Outfielder Hayden Alvarez (High-A / Single-A)

Minor League Player of the Year by Baseball America

Third baseman Jake Munroe (Double-A / High-A)

All-Star Futures Game selection

Starting pitcher Tyler Bremner (Double-A / High-A)
Outfielder Nelson Rada (Triple-A)

Post Season All-Stars selection

Triple-A

Second baseman Christian Moore
Shortstop Denzer Guzman
Designated hitter Niko Kavadas
Utility player Kyren Paris
Starting pitcher George Klassen

Double-A

Relief pitcher Luke Murphy

Single-A

Shortstop Kendrey Maduro
Outfielder Hayden Alvarez
Starting pitcher Dylan Jordan
Relief pitcher Fulton Lockhart

Rookie

Starting pitcher Johnny Slawinski

Player/Pitcher of the Month selection

Triple-A

Infielder Denzer Guzmán (May)
Starting pitcher George Klassen (July)

Double-A

Starting pitcher Austin Gordon (August)

High-A

Outfielder Anthony Scull (May)
Starting pitcher Peyton Olejnik (June)

Single-A

Relief pitcher Brayan Vergara (July)

Rookie

Starting pitcher Johnny Slawinski (May)

Arizona Fall League selection

Relief pitcher Najer Victor (Triple-A)
Shortstop Arjun Nimmala (Double-A)
Third baseman Jake Munroe (Double-A)
Starting pitcher Kyle Robinson (Double-A)
Starting pitcher Peyton Olejnik (High-A)
Relief pitcher Sam Tookoian (High-A)
Starting pitcher Yeferson Vargas (High-A)
First baseman Ryland Zaborowski (High-A)

Records
Preceded by 2025	Los Angeles Angels seasons 2026	Succeeded by 2027
