= Mitch Farris =

American baseball player (born 2001)

Los Angeles Angels – No. 70
- Pitcher
- Born: February 14, 2001 (age 25); Charlotte, North Carolina, U.S.
- Bats: Left Throws: Left

MLB debut
- September 2, 2025, for the Los Angeles Angels

MLB statistics (through 2026 season)
- Win–loss record: 2–7
- Earned run average: 4.80
- Strikeouts: 87
- Stats at Baseball Reference

Teams
- Los Angeles Angels (2025–present)

Mitchell Thomas Farris (born February 14, 2001) is an American professional baseball pitcher for the Los Angeles Angels of Major League Baseball (MLB). He made his MLB debut in 2025.

== Amateur career ==
Farris attended Palm Harbor University High School in Palm Harbor, Florida, and played college baseball at Wingate University. In 2023, he played collegiate summer baseball with the Hyannis Harbor Hawks of the Cape Cod Baseball League.

== Professional career ==
=== Atlanta Braves ===
The Atlanta Braves drafted Farris in the 14th round, with the 429th overall selection, of the 2023 Major League Baseball draft. He split his first professional season between the rookie-level Florida Complex League Braves and Single-A Augusta GreenJackets, posting a cumulative 1-0 record and 2.16 ERA with 21 strikeouts across five appearances (two starts).

Farris split the 2024 season between the Double-A Mississippi Braves, High-A Rome Braves, and Augusta. In 25 appearances (19 starts) for the three affiliates, he pitched to a combined 4-6 record and 3.08 ERA with 131 strikeouts and one save across 108 innings pitched.

=== Los Angeles Angels ===
On December 21, 2024, the Braves traded Farris to the Los Angeles Angels in exchange for Davis Daniel. He began the 2025 season with the Double-A Rocket City Trash Pandas, for whom he logged a 3-8 record and 4.27 ERA with 142 strikeouts in 23 games (22 starts).

On September 1, 2025, Farris was selected to the 40-man roster and promoted to the major leagues for the first time. Farris made his MLB debut for the Angels the following day, starting against the Kansas City Royals, and earned his first career win after allowing one run on three hits in five innings. He also recorded his first career strikeout in the big leagues, punching out Bobby Witt Jr.

Farris was optioned to the Triple-A Salt Lake Bees to begin the 2026 season. On July 26, 2026, Farris recorded his first career save against the San Francisco Giants after recording the final two outs of the ninth inning in relief of Sam Bachman.
