= Carlos Estévez (baseball) =

Dominican baseball player (born 1992)

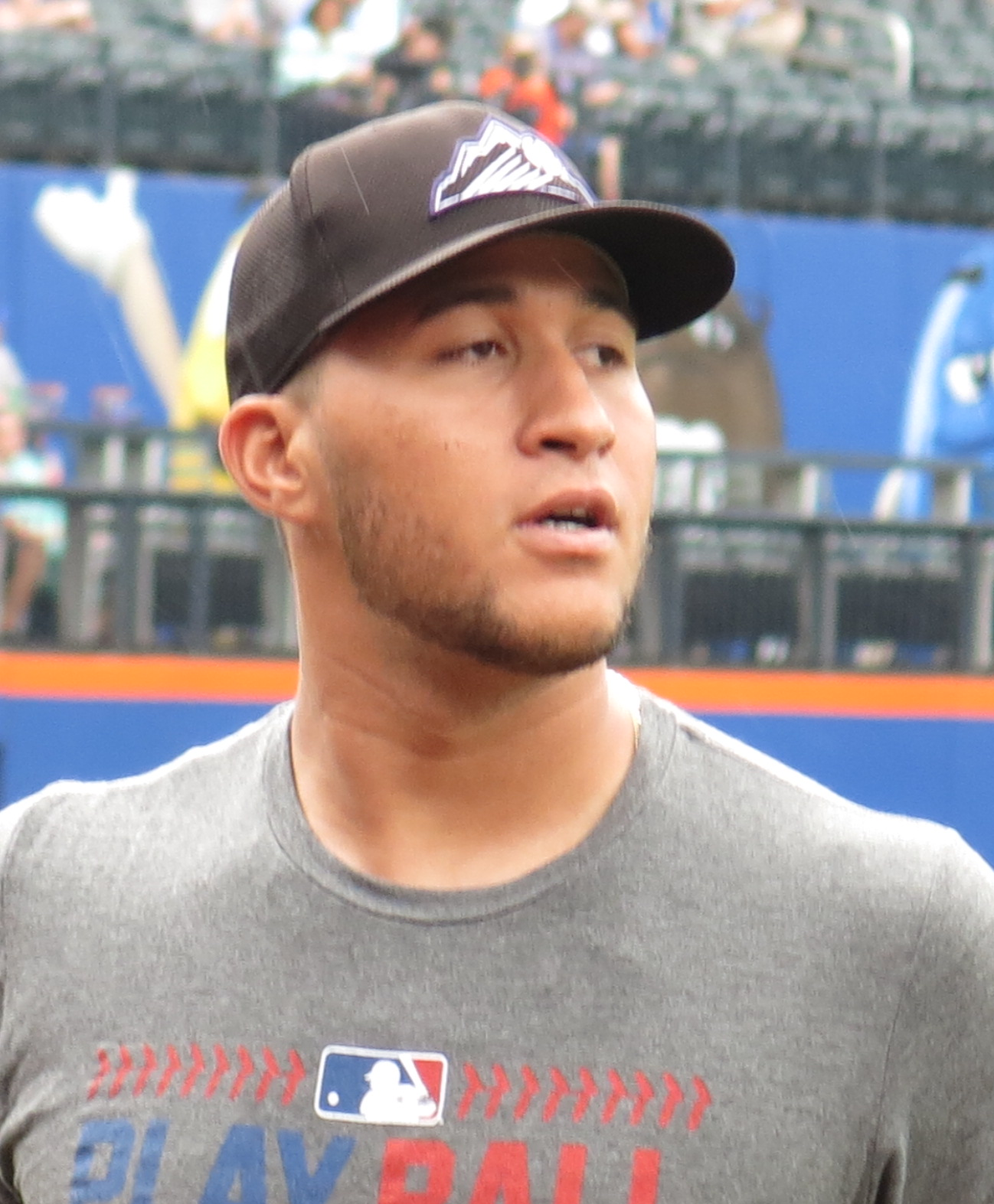
- Estévez with the Rockies in 2016

Free agent
- Pitcher
- Born: December 28, 1992 (age 33); Santo Domingo, Dominican Republic
- Bats: Right Throws: Right

MLB debut
- April 23, 2016, for the Colorado Rockies

MLB statistics (through 2026 season)
- Win–loss record: 31–37
- Earned run average: 4.08
- Strikeouts: 494
- Saves: 124
- Stats at Baseball Reference

Teams
- Colorado Rockies (2016–2022); Los Angeles Angels (2023–2024); Philadelphia Phillies (2024); Kansas City Royals (2025–2026)

Career highlights and awards
- 2x All-Star (2023, 2025); MLB saves leader (2025)
Medals
Men's baseball
Representing Dominican Republic
World Baseball Classic
| Bronze medal – third place | 2026 Miami | Team |

Carlos Samuel Estévez (born December 28, 1992) is a Dominican professional baseball pitcher who is a free agent. He has played in Major League Baseball (MLB) for the Colorado Rockies, Los Angeles Angels, Philadelphia Phillies, and Kansas City Royals. Estévez made his MLB debut in 2016 with the Rockies. He was an All-Star in 2023 and 2025, and led the MLB in saves in 2025.

== Career ==
=== Colorado Rockies ===
Estévez signed with the Rockies as a free agent in 2011, at the age of 18. On November 20, 2015, the Rockies added Estévez to their 40-man roster to protect him from the Rule 5 draft. He was promoted the major leagues on April 22, 2016. He made his debut on April 23. When Rockies' closer Jake McGee went on the disabled list in June, Estévez became the Rockies' new closer. He finished the 2016 season with a 3-7 record, 63 appearances and 11 saves, and a 5.24 ERA.

On April 3, 2017, Estévez pitched a hitless sixth, earning the win against the Milwaukee Brewers on Opening Day. On June 18, 2017, Estévez was recalled from Albuquerque to the Rockies to replace Chad Qualls, who went to the 10-day disabled list. In 35 appearances, he finished with a record of 5–0 and an ERA of 5.57.

Estévez missed the entire 2018 season following several injuries, remaining with the Triple–A Albuquerque Isotopes. The following season, Estévez finished with a 3.75 ERA and 81 strikeouts in 71 games.

In 2020 Estévez's performance regressed from the previous season as he allowed 21 runs in 24 innings pitched, and was 1-3 with a 7.50 ERA. In 2021, he was 3-5 as he pitched in 64 games, posting an ERA of 4.38 with 11 saves.

=== Los Angeles Angels ===
On December 5, 2022, Estévez signed a two-year, $13.5 million contract with the Los Angeles Angels. In the first half of the 2023 season, Estévez had a 1.80 ERA and was successful in converting 21-of-21 save opportunities. He was selected to the 2023 MLB All-Star Game. For the 2023 season, he was 5-5 with a 3.90 ERA, as in the second half he had a 6.59 ERA.

Estévez made 34 appearances for the Angels in 2024, compiling a 2.38 ERA with 32 strikeouts and 20 saves across 34 innings of work.

=== Philadelphia Phillies ===
On July 27, 2024, the Angels traded Estévez to the Philadelphia Phillies in exchange for Samuel Aldegheri and George Klassen. In 20 games for Philadelphia, Estévez posted a 2.57 ERA with 18 strikeouts and 6 saves across 21 innings pitched.

On October 9, in Game 4 of the 2024 National League Division Series against the New York Mets, he was sent to pitch in the bottom of the 6th inning with the bases loaded and surrendered a grand slam to Mets shortstop Francisco Lindor giving them a 4–1 lead, which was the final score. The Mets went on to eliminate the Phillies from the NLDS.

=== Kansas City Royals ===
On January 31, 2025, Estévez signed a two-year, $22 million contract with the Kansas City Royals including a club option for a third year, which would up the deal to $33 million. On June 5, Estévez recorded his 100th career save in Game 2 of a doubleheader against the St. Louis Cardinals. He finished the season with a 2.45 ERA and an MLB-leading 42 saves.

On May 7, 2026, Estévez was shut down after being diagnosed with a rotator cuff strain. He had made only one appearance for the team prior to his placement. Estévez was transferred to the 60-day injured list on June 15. On September 1, it was announced that Estévez would undergo shoulder surgery. On October 29, the Royals declined their $13m contract option on Estévez making him a free agent.

== Personal life ==
An anime fan, Estévez keeps figurines of his favorite characters inside his locker, including characters from Dragon Ball Z, Naruto, and One Piece. In 2016, Estévez met actor Charlie Sheen, who shares his birth name, and the two have kept in correspondence since.

== See also ==
- List of Major League Baseball annual saves leaders
- List of Major League Baseball players from the Dominican Republic
