= St. John the Baptist Diocesan High School =

School in West Islip, New York, United States

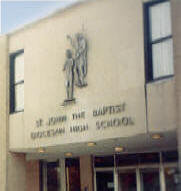
- In Fidie et Lentae

Location
- 1170 Montauk Highway; West Islip, (Suffolk County), New York 11795; United States; 40°41′44″N 73°17′32″W

Information
- Type: Private, diocesan, high school
- Motto: Latin: In Fide et Lenitate (In Faith and in Gentleness)
- Religious affiliation: Roman Catholic
- Patron saint: Saint John the Baptist
- Established: 1966; 60 years ago
- Principal: Vincent Albrecht
- Chaplain: Fr. Dominic
- Teaching staff: 87.1 (FTE) (2017–18)
- Grades: 9–12
- Gender: coeducational
- Enrollment: 1,394 (2017–18)
- Average class size: 26–32 students
- Student to teacher ratio: 24:1 (2023-24)
- Colors: Red; White; Navy Blue
- Athletics conference: NSCHSAA & NSCHSGAA
- Mascot: Cougar
- Team name: Cougars
- Rival: St. Anthony's
- Accreditation: Middle States Association of Colleges and Schools
- Tuition: $12,000 (2023-24)
- Affiliation: National Catholic Educational Association (NCEA)
- Website: stjohnthebaptistdhs.net

St. John the Baptist Diocesan High School is a private, Roman Catholic high school in West Islip, New York. It is operated by the Roman Catholic Diocese of Rockville Centre.

== Faculty ==
Faculty members at St. John's are required to possess a master's degree, and have New York State Teacher Certification. St. John's student to teacher ratio is approximately 16:1.

== Academics ==
Three levels of classes are offered at St. Johns. Honors, Advanced Placement and regents courses. Also, college credit courses are offered through St. John's affiliates such as St. John's University, Molloy College and the New York Institute of Technology. Students placed in the SJB College extension program can work to earn 30 college credits (one year of college) before graduating from St. John's.

== Notable alumni ==
- Richard Angelo, serial killer
- Ed Henry, news anchor
- LeRoy Homer Jr., airline pilot, first officer of the hijacked United Airlines Flight 93 that crashed in Shanksville, Pennsylvania during the September 11 attacks
- Joseph Lhota, former chairman of the Metropolitan Transportation Authority and candidate in the 2013 New York City mayoral election
- Logan O'Hoppe, baseball catcher for the Los Angeles Angels
- Joe Palumbo, baseball pitcher for the Texas Rangers
- Mike Petke, soccer player and head coach of Major League Soccer club Real Salt Lake
- Chris Wingert, soccer player for New York City FC in Major League Soccer
