= Sebastián Rivero =

Venezuelan baseball player (born 1998)

Sebastian Rivero
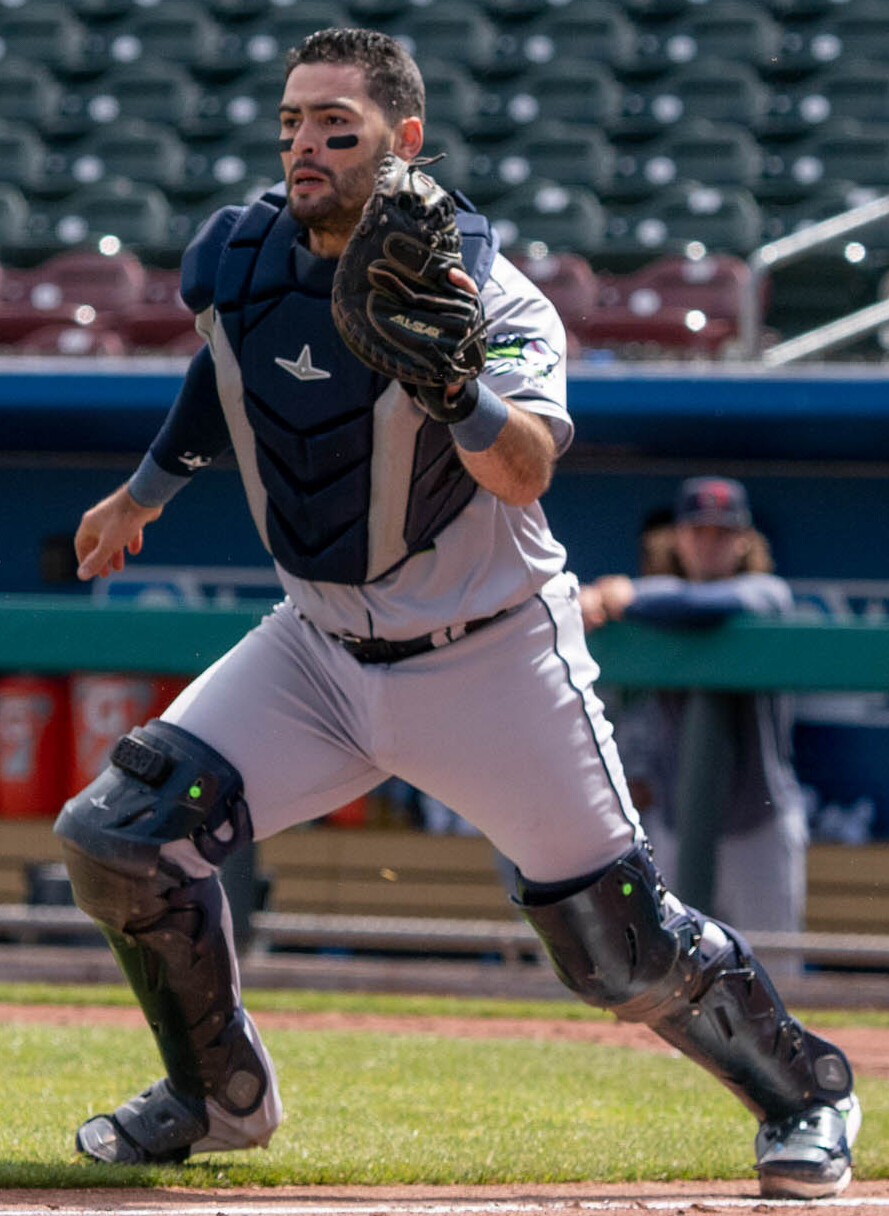
- Rivero with the Gwinnett Stripers in 2024

Free agent
- Catcher
- Born: November 16, 1998 (age 27); Maracay, Venezuela
- Bats: Right Throws: Right

MLB debut
- May 8, 2021, for the Kansas City Royals

MLB statistics (through 2026 season)
- Batting average: .197
- Home runs: 0
- Runs batted in: 14
- Stats at Baseball Reference

Teams
- Kansas City Royals (2021–2022); Los Angeles Angels (2025–2026)

Sebastian Rivero (born November 16, 1998) is a Venezuelan professional baseball catcher who is a free agent. He has previously played in Major League Baseball (MLB) for the Kansas City Royals and Los Angeles Angels. He signed with the Royals as an international free agent in 2013 and made his MLB debut with them in 2021.

== Career ==
=== Kansas City Royals ===
On July 10, 2015, Rivero signed with the Kansas City Royals as an international free agent. He made his professional debut with the DSL Royals in 2016, and also appeared in 38 games for the AZL Royals, accumulating a .280 average between the two clubs. In 2017, he played for the rookie ball Burlington Royals, batting .265/.288/.381 with 4 home runs and 28 RBI. He played for the Single-A Lexington Legends in 2018, hitting .258/.301/.391 with 7 home runs and 34 RBI. He split the 2019 season between the High-A Wilmington Blue Rocks and the Triple-A Omaha Storm Chasers, slashing .216/.273/.280 in 94 games between the teams.

Rivero did not play in a game in 2020 due to the cancellation of the minor league season because of the COVID-19 pandemic. Rivero was added to the Royals’ 60-man player pool for the 2020 season but did not appear for the major league club.

The Royals added Rivero to their 40-man roster after the 2020 season to protect him from being selected in the Rule 5 draft. On May 3, 2021, Rivero was promoted to the major leagues for the first time. On May 8, Rivero made his MLB debut as the starting catcher against the Chicago White Sox.

Rivero returned to Omaha in 2022, and was promoted to the major leagues on July 14.

On November 10, 2022, Rivero was designated for assignment and was placed on unconditional release waivers on November 16.

=== Chicago White Sox ===
On December 16, 2022, Rivero signed a minor league deal with the Chicago White Sox. He split the 2023 season between the Double–A Birmingham Barons and Triple–A Charlotte Knights. In 73 combined games, Rivero batted .219/.273/.326 with 4 home runs and 28 RBI. He elected free agency following the season on November 6, 2023.

=== Atlanta Braves ===
On November 13, 2023, Rivero signed a minor league contract with the Atlanta Braves. He split 2024 between the Double–A Mississippi Braves and Triple–A Gwinnett Stripers, playing in 75 total games and batting .186/.239/.249 with one home run and 26 RBI. Rivero elected free agency following the season on November 4, 2024.

=== Los Angeles Angels ===
On December 12, 2024, Rivero signed a minor league contract with the Los Angeles Angels. In 68 appearances for the Triple-A Salt Lake Bees, he batted .264/.309/.429 with nine home runs and 45 RBI. On September 8, 2025, the Angels selected Rivero's contract, adding him to their active roster. He made 11 appearances for Los Angeles, going 6-for-33 (.182) with two RBI and one stolen base. On November 21, Rivero was non-tendered by the Angels and became a free agent.

On December 3, 2025, Rivero re-signed with the Angels on a minor league contract. He was assigned to Triple-A Salt Lake to begin the regular season. On April 26, 2026, the Angels added Rivero to their active roster following an injury to Logan O'Hoppe. Against the Los Angeles Dodgers on June 7, he went 5-for-5 and drove in six runs. It was only the sixth time since 1920 that a nine-hole hitter had five hits and five RBI. Rivero was activated from the injured list on August 30, and was subsequently optioned to Triple–A Salt Lake. In 24 total appearances for the Angels, he batted .245/.286/.283 with eight RBI and three walks. On October 29, Rivero was removed from the 40–man roster and sent outright to Salt Lake. He elected free agency on November 2.
