= Richard Angelo =

American serial killer

- Born: August 29, 1962 (age 64); Long Island, New York, U.S.
- Convictions: Second degree murder (2 counts); Second degree manslaughter Criminally negligent homicide Assault (6 counts)
- Penalty: Life imprisonment (minimum term of 50 years)

Details
- Victims: 4 deaths, 1 attempt, 30+ suspected
- Span of crimes: April – October 1987
- Country: United States
- State: New York
- Date apprehended: November 15, 1987

Richard Angelo (born August 29, 1962) is an American serial killer and former nurse who operated within Long Island and West Islip, New York. In 1989, he was convicted of murdering several of his patients and sentenced to 50-years-to-life in prison.

== Early life ==
Angelo was born on August 29, 1962, to parents who were both working in education. His mother was an economics teacher, and his father was a high school guidance counselor for the Lindenhurst school district on Long Island. He graduated from St. John the Baptist Diocesan High School in 1980 and then entered a two-year nursing program at Farmingdale State College, where he was a well-regarded honor student.

== Arrest ==
Angelo first came to the attention of the public in October 1987 when he was suspected of poisoning a patient at then Good Samaritan Medical Center. He was accused of injecting Gerolamo Kuchich with pancuronium, a muscle relaxant, via his I.V. The patient felt unwell after the injection, and later paged a nurse to help him. Angelo was arrested for assault on the 73-year-old patient because he was the only person to match the description given to the police.

Following his arrest, Angelo confessed to having poisoned other patients with pancuronium and Suxamethonium chloride, both of which are paralytic agents used in anesthesia. As a result, as many as 30 recently deceased patients were exhumed and examined for traces of these powerful paralyzing agents.

In all, Angelo was suspected of poisoning at least 35 people at the hospital while working there for seven months, though the medical examiner was unable to conclusively attribute the deaths to the injections. He claimed that his motive was to portray himself as a hero. After poisoning his victims, he would wait until they went into cardiac arrest and then come by and save them in front of his colleagues. He was held in Suffolk County Jail for more than a year, awaiting trial. He declined to pay his $50,000 bail, fearing for his safety given the high-profile nature of the case.

== Victims ==
A total of 32 bodies were exhumed in order to collect tissue samples. The presence of Pavulon was detected in the following seven victims:

- John Stanley Fisher, 75, of Amityville, died on September 8, 1987.
- Milton Poultney, 75, of Lindenhurst, died on September 16, 1987.
- Joseph Francis O'Neill, 79, of West Islip, died on September 21, 1987.
- Frederick LaGois, 65, of Babylon, died on October 9, 1987.
- Joan Hayes, 53, died on October 5, 1987.
- Gerolamo Kuchich, 73, from Yugoslavia and visiting Dix Hills, was injected with a non-fatal dose of Pavulon on October 11, 1987.
- Anthony Greene, 57, of North Babylon, died on October 16, 1987.

== Trial and conviction ==
During the eight-week trial, 32 witnesses testified and more than 100 exhibits were entered into evidence. On December 14, 1989, Angelo was found guilty of two counts of second-degree murder: Poultney, Greene; one count of second-degree manslaughter: Fisher; one count of criminally negligent homicide: LaGois; two counts of first-degree assault: Kuchich; three counts of second-degree assault: Fisher, Greene, Poultney. Not guilty verdicts were returned for O'Neill and Hayes, despite having Pavulon in their systems. On January 24, 1990, a Suffolk County judge sentenced him to 61 ⅓-years-to-life. However, the maximum possible term, per state law, was 50-years-to-life.

He is serving a life sentence at Sing Sing Correctional Facility and will become eligible for parole in 2049, when he is 87.

== See also ==
- List of serial killers in the United States
- List of medical and pseudo-medical serial killers
