= Erik Tolman =

American baseball player (born 1999)

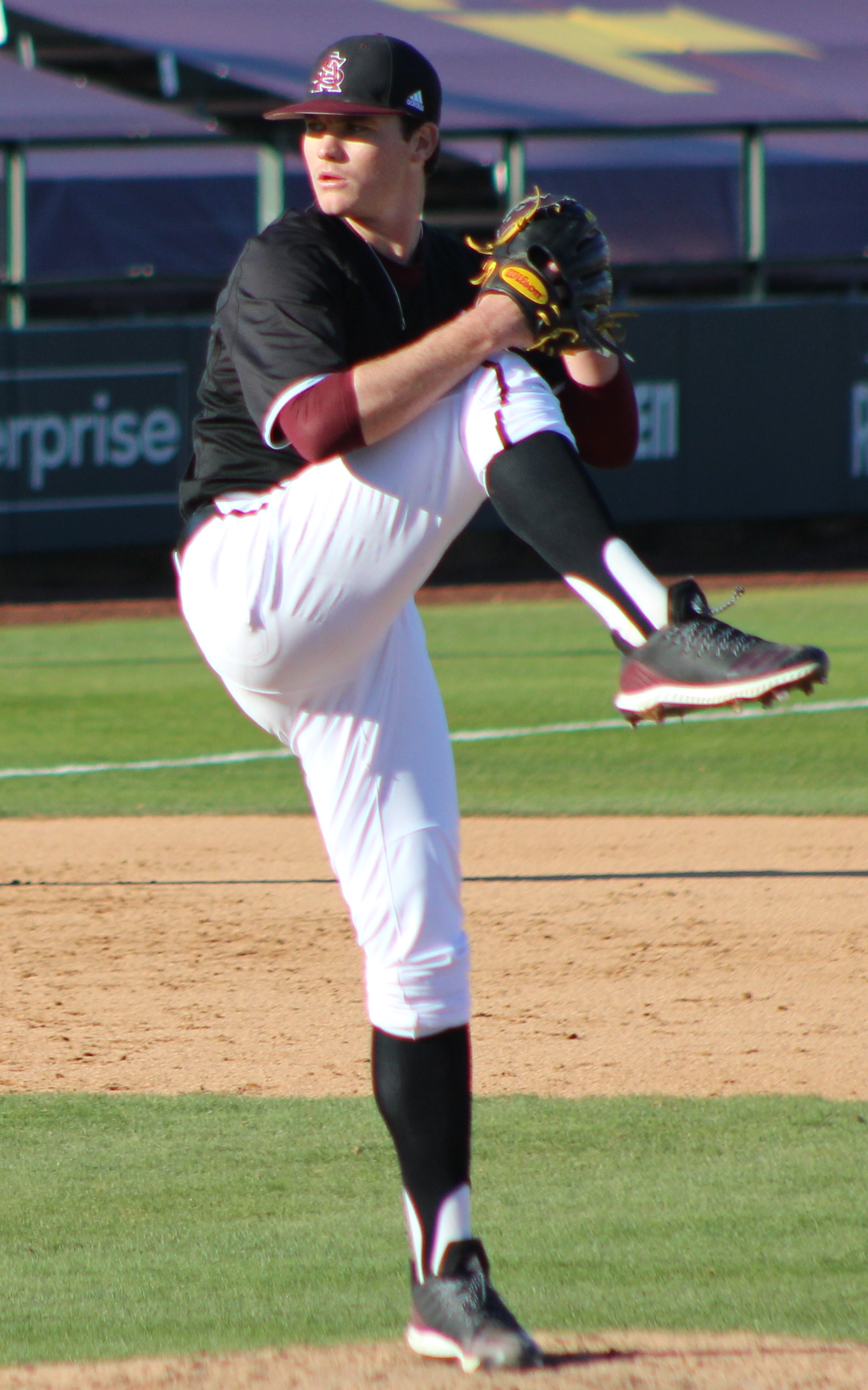
- Tolman with Arizona State in 2019

Washington Nationals – No. 73
- Pitcher
- Born: June 3, 1999 (age 27); Irvine, California, U.S.
- Bats: Left Throws: Left

MLB debut
- August 22, 2026, for the Washington Nationals

MLB statistics (through 2026 season)
- Win–loss record: 1–1
- Earned run average: 2.93
- Strikeouts: 17
- Stats at Baseball Reference

Teams
- Washington Nationals (2026–present)

Erik Tolman (born June 3, 1999) is an American professional baseball pitcher for the Washington Nationals of Major League Baseball (MLB). He debuted in MLB in 2026.

== Career ==
Tolman played college baseball at Arizona State University. He was selected by the Washington Nationals in the 14th round of the 2021 MLB draft.

Tolman underwent his second Tommy John surgery procedure on his left elbow in 2022, after previously having his ulnar collateral ligament of the elbow replaced while at Arizona State. After rehabbing from surgery, while pitching for the Fredericksburg Nationals in 2023, he caught a cleat in the turf while hopping over the foul line on his way from the mound, tearing his calf and hamstring muscles, his meniscus, and every ligament in his knee. Tolman lost substantial feeling and lateral movement in his foot, requiring intensive physical therapy that included relearning how to walk and run. He ultimately returned to baseball while wearing a custom ankle brace for stability.

Tolman was called up to the majors for the first time on August 19, 2026. He made his major league debut August 22 against the Miami Marlins, pitching a scoreless inning in relief. He earned his first career save August 31, taking over with the bases loaded and no outs in the eighth inning and ultimately pitching two scoreless innings with four strikeouts, not allowing a run to score.
