= José Fermín (pitcher) =

Dominican baseball player (born 2001)

Los Angeles Angels – No. 65
- Pitcher
- Born: November 28, 2001 (age 24); Payita, Dominican Republic
- Bats: Right Throws: Right

MLB debut
- April 26, 2025, for the Los Angeles Angels

MLB statistics (through 2026 season)
- Win–loss record: 7-5
- Earned run average: 4.09
- Strikeouts: 101
- Stats at Baseball Reference

Teams
- Los Angeles Angels (2025–present)

José Miguel Fermín (born November 28, 2001) is a Dominican professional baseball pitcher for the Los Angeles Angels of Major League Baseball (MLB).

== Career ==
On October 20, 2023, Fermín signed with the Los Angeles Angels as an international free agent. He split his first professional season between the Single-A Inland Empire 66ers, High-A Tri-City Dust Devils, and Double-A Rocket City Trash Pandas. In 39 appearances for the three affiliates, Fermín accumulated a combined 6-6 record and 3.15 ERA with 91 strikeouts and seven saves across 65 2/3 innings pitched. He began the 2025 season with Double-A Rocket City.

On April 26, 2025, Fermín was promoted to the major leagues for the first time. On July 1, Fermín recorded his first career win after tossing a scoreless seventh inning against the Atlanta Braves. He made 40 appearances for Los Angeles during his rookie campaign, compiling a 3-2 record and 4.46 ERA with 39 strikeouts across 34 1/3 innings pitched.

Fermín was optioned to Triple-A Salt Lake to begin the 2026 season.
