= Omar Martínez (baseball) =

Venezuelan baseball player (born 2001)

Free agent
- Catcher
- Born: July 5, 2001 (age 25); San Felix, Venezuela
- Bats: Right Throws: Right

MLB debut
- May 8, 2026, for the Los Angeles Angels

MLB statistics (through 2026 season)
- Batting average: .333
- Home runs: 0
- Runs batted in: 0
- Stats at Baseball Reference

Teams
- Los Angeles Angels (2026)

Omar Andres Martínez (born July 5, 2001) is a Venezuelan professional baseball catcher who is a free agent. He made his Major League Baseball (MLB) debut in 2026.

== Career ==
=== New York Yankees ===
On June 15, 2018, Martínez signed with the New York Yankees as an international free agent. He made his professional debut with the Dominican Summer League Yankees. Martínez split the 2019 campaign between the DSL Yankees and the rookie–level Gulf Coast League Yankees, recording a .232/.368/.324 batting line with two home runs and 18 RBI.

Martínez did not play in a game in 2020 due to the cancellation of the minor league season because of the COVID-19 pandemic. He returned to action in 2021 with the DSL Yankees, batting .250 with six home runs and 27 RBI; Martínez spent the 2022 season with the rookie–level Florida Complex League Yankees, hitting .282 with three home runs and 17 RBI.

Martínez made 105 appearances for the Single–A Tampa Tarpons in 2023, slashing .251/.367/.445 with 18 home runs, 71 RBI, and eight stolen bases. During the 2024 campaign, he appeared in 104 contests for the High–A Hudson Valley Renegades, batting .238/.374/.404 with 13 home runs and 41 RBI.

Martínez split the 2025 season between High–A Hudson Valley, the Double–A Somerset Patriots, and Triple–A Scranton/Wilkes-Barre RailRiders; in 104 appearances for the three affiliates, he posted a cumulative .220/.319/.358 batting line with 12 home runs and 55 RBI. He elected free agency following the season on November 6, 2025.

=== Los Angeles Angels ===
On November 28, 2025, Martínez signed a minor league contract with the Los Angeles Angels organization. He was assigned to the Triple-A Salt Lake Bees to begin the regular season, where he batted .212/.307/.424 with four home runs and seven RBI across 20 appearances. On May 8, 2026, Martínez was selected to the 40-man roster and promoted to the major leagues for the first time. In five appearances for Los Angeles, Martínez went 1-for-3 (.333). The Angels optioned him back to Salt Lake on May 15. Martínez was designated for assignment by the Angels on June 6. He cleared waivers and was sent outright to Salt Lake on June 13. He elected free agency on November 2.
