= Trevor Martin (baseball) =

American baseball player (born 2000)

Los Angeles Angels – No. 54
- Pitcher
- Born: December 15, 2000 (age 25); Poteau, Oklahoma, U.S.
- Bats: Right Throws: Right

MLB debut
- April 20, 2026, for the Tampa Bay Rays

MLB statistics (through 2026 season)
- Win–loss record: 0–1
- Earned run average: 4.11
- Strikeouts: 9
- Stats at Baseball Reference

Teams
- Tampa Bay Rays (2026); Los Angeles Angels (2026–present)

Trevor Zane Martin (born December 15, 2000) is an American professional baseball pitcher for the Los Angeles Angels of Major League Baseball (MLB). He has previously played in MLB for the Tampa Bay Rays.

== Career ==
Martin played college baseball at Oklahoma State University. In 2021 and 2022, he played collegiate summer baseball with the Chatham Anglers of the Cape Cod Baseball League.

=== Tampa Bay Rays ===
Martin was selected by the Tampa Bay Rays in the third round (104th overall) of the 2022 Major League Baseball draft. He made his professional debut with the rookie-level Florida Complex League Rays. Martin spent the 2023 season with the Single-A Charleston RiverDogs, compiling a 10–5 record and 3.52 ERA with 131 strikeouts in 110 innings pitched across 25 games (22 starts).

In 2024, Martin made 28 appearances (26 starts) split between the High-A Bowling Green Hot Rods and Double-A Montgomery Biscuits, accumulating a 6–5 record and 4.41 ERA with 138 strikeouts over 122 1/3 innings of work. He split the 2025 season between Montgomery and the Triple-A Durham Bulls. In 38 appearances out of the bullpen, Martin logged a cumulative 5–1 record and 3.21 ERA with 55 strikeouts and three saves across 53 1/3 innings pitched.

On April 20, 2026, Martin was promoted to the major leagues for the first time. He made six appearances for the Rays, recording a 3.97 ERA with seven strikeouts across 11 1/3 innings pitched. Martin was designated for assignment by Tampa Bay on August 13.

=== Los Angeles Angels ===
On August 15, 2026, Martin was claimed off of waivers by the Los Angeles Angels.
