= Walbert Ureña =

Dominican baseball player (born 2004)

- Ureña with the Angels in September 2026

Los Angeles Angels – No. 57
- Pitcher
- Born: January 25, 2004 (age 22); Mao, Dominican Republic
- Bats: Right Throws: Right

MLB debut
- March 26, 2026, for the Los Angeles Angels

MLB statistics (through September 23, 2026)
- Win–loss record: 9–11
- Earned run average: 2.97
- Strikeouts: 142
- Stats at Baseball Reference

Teams
- Los Angeles Angels (2026–present)

Walbert Jhoel Ureña (born January 25, 2004) is a Dominican professional baseball pitcher for the Los Angeles Angels of Major League Baseball (MLB). He made his MLB debut in 2026.

== Career ==
Ureña signed with the Los Angeles Angels as an international free agent on March 31, 2021. He made his professional debut in 2022 with the rookie-level Arizona Complex League Angels, posting a 3–4 record and 3.86 ERA with 45 strikeouts across 12 appearances (10 starts).

Ureña spent the 2023 campaign with the Single-A Inland Empire 66ers, compiling a 4–7 record and 5.66 ERA with 97 strikeouts in 98 2/3 innings pitched across 22 appearances (21 starts). In 2024, he started 16 games for the High-A Tri-City Dust Devils, accumulating a 2–7 record and 4.19 ERA with 64 strikeouts across 77 1/3 innings pitched.

Ureña split the 2025 season between the Double-A Rocket City Trash Pandas and Triple-A Salt Lake Bees, posting a cumulative 6–9 record and 4.34 ERA with 125 strikeouts in 141 innings pitched over 28 starts. On November 18, 2025, the Angels added Ureña to their 40-man roster to protect him from the Rule 5 draft.

Ureña made the Angels' Opening Day roster in 2026, and he made his major league debut on Opening Day against the Houston Astros.
