= Ben Joyce (baseball) =

American baseball player (born 2000)

Los Angeles Angels – No. 44
- Pitcher
- Born: September 17, 2000 (age 26); Knoxville, Tennessee, U.S.
- Bats: Right Throws: Right

MLB debut
- May 29, 2023, for the Los Angeles Angels

MLB statistics (through 2026 season)
- Win–loss record: 4–3
- Earned run average: 3.36
- Strikeouts: 62
- Stats at Baseball Reference

Teams
- Los Angeles Angels (2023–present)

Benjamin Alan Joyce (born September 17, 2000) is an American professional baseball pitcher for the Los Angeles Angels of Major League Baseball (MLB). He played college baseball at the University of Tennessee, where he gained acclaim for throwing the fastest pitch in college baseball history at 105.5 miles per hour (169.8 km/h). Joyce was selected by the Angels in the third round of the 2022 MLB draft, and made his MLB debut in 2023.

== Amateur career ==
Joyce grew up in Knoxville, Tennessee, and attended Farragut High School. He entered high school at 5 ft 5 in (1.65 m) and weighed 100 lb (45 kg) and did not make the varsity baseball team until his junior year, by which time he had grown to 6 ft 0 in (1.83 m) tall.

Joyce enrolled at Walters State Community College along with his twin brother Zach, and missed his freshman season due to a stress fracture in his elbow. By the end of the year, he had grown to 6 ft 5 in (1.96 m) tall. As a sophomore, Joyce went 3–1 with a 4.79 ERA and 35 strikeouts in 20 2/3 innings pitched. Joyce and his brother committed to transfer to Tennessee to continue their college careers. Joyce tore the ulnar collateral ligament during a fall practice and had Tommy John surgery, causing him to miss his first season at Tennessee. In his first healthy season at Tennessee as a redshirt junior, Joyce gained national attention for regularly throwing his fastball over 100 miles per hour (160 km/h), reaching as high as 104 miles per hour (167 km/h). On May 1, 2022, he threw the fastest recorded pitch in the history of college baseball with a 105.5 miles per hour (169.8 km/h) fastball. Joyce finished the season with a 2.23 ERA and 53 strikeouts in 32 1/3 innings pitched over 27 appearances.

== Professional career ==
=== 2022 ===
The Los Angeles Angels selected Joyce in the third round in the 2022 MLB draft. He signed with the Angels on July 22, 2022, and received a $1 million signing bonus. Joyce was assigned to the Double-A Rocket City Trash Pandas to start his professional career. In Joyce's first professional game, he gave up four hits and two earned runs with a strikeout in one inning of relief pitching. He finished his first professional season at 1–0 with a 2.08 ERA, 20 strikeouts, and a save in 13 appearances.

=== 2023 ===
In 2023, the Angels invited Joyce to spring training as a non-roster invitee. In 14 appearances, he registered a 4.60 ERA with 24 strikeouts and four saves in 15 2/3 innings pitched. On May 28, 2023, Joyce was selected to the 40-man roster and promoted to the major leagues for the first time. He made his major league debut the following day against the Chicago White Sox, pitching a scoreless inning in relief with two strikeouts. After five appearances, he was placed on the injured list with ulnar neuritis on June 10. He was transferred to the 60-day injured list on July 27. Joyce was activated from the injured list on September 10. In 12 relief outings during his rookie campaign, he posted a 5.40 ERA with 10 strikeouts across 10 innings.

=== 2024 ===
Joyce was optioned to Double-A Rocket City to begin the 2024 season. On June 2, 2024, Joyce was recalled by the Angels. On August 3, during a game against the New York Mets, Joyce struck out J.D. Martinez on a 104.7-mile-per-hour (168.5 km/h) fastball to get his first-ever save. It was the fastest strike-out pitch to be thrown in MLB since at least 2008, and the sixth-fastest pitch thrown since 2009. On September 3, Joyce struck out Los Angeles Dodgers' Tommy Edman on a 105.5-mile-per-hour (169.8 km/h) fastball. Joyce was placed on the 15-day injured list on September 10, 2024, with the Angels announcing he would be shut down for the rest of the 2024 season. He finished the year with a 2–0 record and four saves with a 2.08 ERA and 33 strikeouts in 34 2/3 innings pitched.

=== 2025 ===
Joyce made five appearances for Los Angeles in 2025, posting a 1–0 record and 6.23 ERA with one strikeout across 4 1/3 innings pitched. On May 14, 2025, it was announced that Joyce had undergone season-ending surgery on his right shoulder.

=== 2026 ===
Joyce began the 2026 season on the injured list as he continued to recover from surgery. On May 16, 2026, he was transferred to the 60-day injured list due to minor shoulder discomfort experienced during his rehabilitation. On August 4, Joyce was reinstated to the Angels' active roster. He made his first major league appearance in 2026 the following day against the Baltimore Orioles.

== Personal life ==
Joyce's twin brother, Zach, played with Ben at Tennessee and was also selected by the Angels, going in the 14th round of the 2023 MLB draft.
