= Sam Aldegheri =

Italian baseball player (born 2001)

Los Angeles Angels – No. 61
- Pitcher
- Born: 19 September 2001 (age 25); Verona, Veneto, Italy
- Bats: Left Throws: Left

MLB debut
- August 30, 2024, for the Los Angeles Angels

MLB statistics (through 2026 season)
- Win–loss record: 4–8
- Earned run average: 5.67
- Strikeouts: 44
- Stats at Baseball Reference

Teams
- Los Angeles Angels (2024–present)

Samuel Aldegheri (born 19 September 2001) is an Italian professional baseball pitcher for the Los Angeles Angels of Major League Baseball (MLB). He made his MLB debut in 2024. The first major league pitcher to be born and raised in Italy, he has also represented the Italy national baseball team at the World Baseball Classic.

== Professional career ==
=== Parma Clima ===
Aldegheri signed with Parma Clima of the Italian Baseball League for the 2019 European Champions Cup, joining his older brother Mattia. He pitched in eight games with Parma in the 2020 season.

=== Philadelphia Phillies ===
In July 2019, he signed with the Philadelphia Phillies as an international free agent. He made his professional debut in 2021 with the Rookie-level Florida Complex League Phillies before being promoted to the Low-A Clearwater Threshers. He was placed on the injured list with a left elbow injury on 20 August and missed the remainder of the season and a portion of the following season, which he spent exclusively in the Florida Complex League.

Aldegheri returned to Clearwater for the start of the 2023 season before being promoted to the High-A Jersey Shore BlueClaws on 3 August. After the 2023 season ended, his control was ranked the best in the Phillies farm system by Baseball America. Aldegheri returned to Jersey Shore for the start of the 2024 season.

=== Los Angeles Angels ===
On 27 July 2024, the Phillies traded Aldegheri and George Klassen to the Los Angeles Angels in exchange for Carlos Estévez. On 29 August, the Angels called Aldegheri up to the major leagues for the first time. While other Italian-born pitchers had previously appeared in the major leagues, such as Marino Pieretti, Aldegheri became the first pitcher born and raised in Italy to appear in an MLB game, when he made his debut with the Angels on 30 August. In three starts during his rookie campaign, Aldegheri posted a 1–2 record and 4.85 ERA with 10 strikeouts over 13 innings of work.

Aldegheri was optioned to the Triple-A Salt Lake Bees to begin the 2025 season. On 2 June 2025, he was recalled from Double-A Rocket City to join the major league club, where he pitched in one game, allowing two unearned runs across 2 1/3 frames, before being sent down again. Aldegheri made four appearances (including two starts) for Los Angeles during the regular season, logging an 0-2 record and 7.90 ERA with 12 strikeouts across 13 2/3 innings pitched.

Aldegheri was again optioned to Triple-A Salt Lake to begin the 2026 season.

Aldegheri was called back up to the Angels on 7 June 2026 to replace Jack Kochanowicz who was placed on the 15-day IL.

== International career ==
Aldegheri pitched with the Italian national team at the 2018 Prague Baseball week; his performance there made a good first impression on scout Claudio Scerrato, who signed him to a contract with the Phillies organization.

He was named to the Italian square at the 2026 World Baseball Classic, one of three native-born Italians to make the team's WBC roster (the others being Gabriele Quattrini and Claudio Scotti), and the only one with MLB experience. Aldegheri pitched 4.2 scoreless innings with eight strikeouts in Italy's 8-0 shutout over Brazil, becoming the first pitcher born and raised in Italy to make a start for the Azzurri in WBC play. Starting Italy's quarterfinal matchup against Puerto Rico, he lasted 1.1 innings and allowed a lead-off homerun to Willi Castro before being relieved in the second inning. Over the course of his two starts in the tournament, Aldegheri posted a 3.00 ERA with 2 earned runs in six innings of work.
