= Samy Natera Jr. =

Mexican baseball player (born 1999)

Los Angeles Angels – No. 52
- Pitcher
- Born: November 5, 1999 (age 26); Ciudad Juárez, Mexico
- Bats: Left Throws: Left

MLB debut
- June 6, 2026, for the Los Angeles Angels

MLB statistics (through 2026 season)
- Win–loss record: 1–2
- Earned run average: 3.13
- Strikeouts: 48
- Stats at Baseball Reference

Teams
- Los Angeles Angels (2026–present)

Samuel Natera Jr. (born November 5, 1999) is a Mexican professional baseball pitcher for the Los Angeles Angels of Major League Baseball (MLB). He made his MLB debut in 2026.

== Amateur career ==
Natera Jr. attended Lydia Patterson Institute College Prep School in El Paso, Texas. At first, he mainly played basketball, and played baseball as a first baseman. When 17, he was converted into a pitcher. In high school, he was named Lydia Patterson Institute Athlete of the Year, and School MVP in both baseball and basketball. Natera Jr. played college baseball at New Mexico State University. In 2021, he appeared in 14 games with 10 starts, pitching 48 2/3 innings with a 6.47 ERA, and played collegiate summer baseball with the Wareham Gatemen of the Cape Cod Baseball League. In 2022, he only pitched in 8 games due to injuries, recording a 6.92 ERA and 44 strikeouts.

== Professional career ==
The Los Angeles Angels drafted Natera Jr. in the 17th round of the 2022 Major League Baseball draft, the 508th overall selection. He signed with the team for a $125,000 bonus. He made his professional debut 2023 with High-A Tri-City Dust Devils, posting a 4.20 ERA over 20 starts. He played 2024 with High-A, went 2–0 with a 0.60 ERA in 5 games. After the season, he was selected as a representative from Angels for 2024 Arizona Fall League, posting a team-low 0.75 ERA in 12 innings pitched.

Natera Jr. started 2025 with the Double-A Rocket City Trash Pandas. He was promoted to Triple-A Salt Lake Bees on August, recording a 4–1, 2.64 ERA, and 68 strikeouts in 47.2 innings at Double-A. Natera posted a 3.86 ERA with 17 strikeouts and 11 walks in 9 1/3 innings over eight appearances at Triple-A.

Natera was assigned to Triple-A Salt Lake to begin the 2026 campaign, where he compiled a 5–0 record and 3.00 ERA with 44 strikeouts and one save across 20 appearances. On June 5, 2026, Natera was selected to the 40-man roster and promoted to the major leagues for the first time. He made his MLB debut on June 8 against the Texas Rangers.

== International career ==
Natera Jr. played for Team Mexico in 2026 World Baseball Classic.
