= George Klassen =

American baseball player (born 2002)

Los Angeles Angels – No. 58
- Pitcher
- Born: January 26, 2002 (age 24); West Bend, Wisconsin, U.S.
- Bats: Right Throws: Right

MLB debut
- April 5, 2026, for the Los Angeles Angels

MLB statistics (through 2026 season)
- Win–loss record: 2–2
- Earned run average: 3.67
- Strikeouts: 24
- Stats at Baseball Reference

Teams
- Los Angeles Angels (2026–present)

George Edward Klassen (born January 26, 2002) is an American professional baseball pitcher for the Los Angeles Angels of Major League Baseball (MLB). He made his MLB debut in 2026.

== Amateur career ==
Klassen attended Port Washington High School in Port Washington, Wisconsin. In 2019 season as a junior, he recorded 56 strikeouts in 22 innings pitched, allowing only 10 hits. As a two way player, he batted .362 with 25 hits. He also played for the GRB Rays and Midwest Reds Scout Team, posting a 5-2 with 39 strikeouts in 38 innings pitched over 3 seasons. At the 2020 Major League Baseball draft class, he was ranked No. 259 overall player by Baseball America. Furthermore, Perfect Game USA ranked him as No. 1 pitcher and No. 2 overall player in the state.

Klassen played college baseball at the University of Minnesota. He missed his freshman year at Minnesota in 2021 after undergoing Tommy John Surgery. In 2022, he played collegiate summer baseball with the Lakeshore Chinooks of the Northwoods League. In his sophomore 2023 season, he had 5.72 ERA with 49 strikeouts in 56.2 innings pitched across 14 games, including 13 starts.

== Professional career ==
=== Philadelphia Phillies ===
Klassen was selected by the Philadelphia Phillies in the sixth round of the 2023 Major League Baseball draft. He made his professional debut in 2024 with the Single-A Clearwater Threshers. Over the first 2 months of the season, he posted a 0.71 ERA, 0.87 WHIP and 57 strikeouts across 38.0 innings pitched. On June 11, Klassen was promoted to the High-A Jersey Shore Blue Claws. At High-A, he made 5 starts, posting a 4.22 ERA with 1.17 WHIP and 32 strikeouts in 21.1 innings pitched.

=== Los Angeles Angels ===
On July 27, 2024, the Phillies traded Klassen and Samuel Aldegheri to the Los Angeles Angels in exchange for Carlos Estévez. In 2024, he played in four teams, posting a 3.10 ERA with 135 strikeouts and 46 walks in 93 innings pitched. Klassen started 2025 with Double-A Rocket City Trash Pandas. He was named the Angels’ representative in the 2025 All-Star Futures Game on July 12. He was promoted to the Triple-A Salt Lake Bees on September 16. Between the two levels, he had a combined ERA of 5.22 with a 4-12 record, 134 strikeouts and 47 walks in 108.2 innings pitched over 25 starts.

On April 5, 2026, the Angels promoted Klassen to the major leagues, and he pitched 2 2/3 innings later that night in a debut against the Seattle Mariners. After pitching another two innings on April 11, Klassen bruised his right index finger and his ERA stood at 13.50, resulting in his return to Salt Lake.
