= Jack Sinclair (baseball) =

American baseball player (born 1999)

Washington Nationals – No. 49
- Pitcher
- Born: May 3, 1999 (age 27); Coral Springs, Florida, U.S.
- Bats: Right Throws: Right

MLB debut
- September 4, 2026, for the Washington Nationals

MLB statistics (through 2026 season)
- Win–loss record: 1–0
- Earned run average: 2.45
- Strikeouts: 8
- Stats at Baseball Reference

Teams
- Washington Nationals (2026–present)

Jack Thomas Sinclair (born May 3, 1999) is an American professional baseball pitcher for the Washington Nationals of Major League Baseball (MLB). He made his MLB debut in 2026.

== Amateur career ==
Sinclair attended J. P. Taravella High School in Coral Springs, Florida. He attended the University of Central Florida (UCF), where he played college baseball for the UCF Knights for four seasons.

In between his seasons at UCF, Sinclair had three separate stints playing collegiate summer baseball. The first (2018) was in the Expedition League, playing for the Western Nebraska Pioneers. In 2019, he played for the Wisconsin Rapids Rafters of the Northwoods League. After his junior year, he played for the Macon Bacon of the Coastal Plain League.

== Professional career ==
The Washington Nationals selected Sinclair in the 16th round, with the 473rd overall selection, of the 2021 MLB draft. Sinclair signed with the Nationals for $100,000.

Sinclair was assigned to the Triple–A Rochester Red Wings to begin the 2026 season, compiling a 6–2 record and 4.03 ERA with 74 strikeouts and one save across 52 appearances. On September 4, 2026, the Nationals promoted him to the major leagues. He made his MLB debut that night.
