= Blake Weiman =

American baseball player (born 1995)

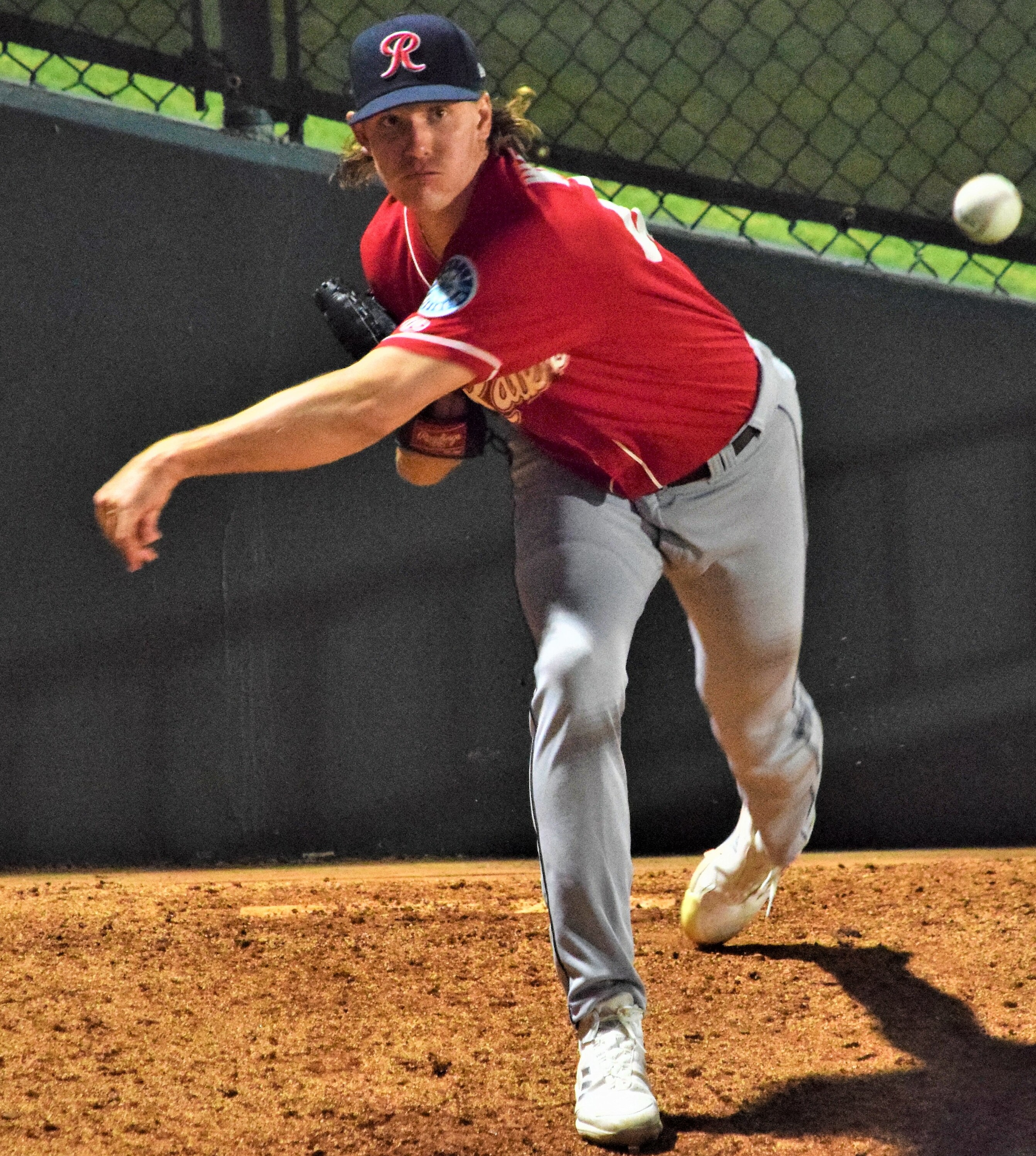
- Weiman with the Tacoma Rainiers in 2023

Los Angeles Angels – No. 68
- Pitcher
- Born: November 5, 1995 (age 30); Littleton, Colorado, U.S.
- Bats: Right Throws: Left

MLB debut
- August 7, 2026, for the Los Angeles Angels

MLB statistics (through 2026 season)
- Win–loss record: 1–1
- Earned run average: 2.55
- Strikeouts: 16
- Stats at Baseball Reference

Teams
- Los Angeles Angels (2026–present)

Blake Gerald Weiman (born November 5, 1995) is an American professional pitcher for the Los Angeles Angels of Major League Baseball (MLB). He made his MLB debut in 2026.

== Amateur career ==
Weiman attended Columbine High School in Columbine, Colorado. He signed to play college baseball at the University of Kansas. During his high school career, he played in three Colorado Rockies Futures games. In 2014, as a senior, he went 7–0 with a 1.40 ERA and was named to the All-Colorado baseball team. Undrafted out of high school in the 2014 Major League Baseball draft, he enrolled at Kansas.

In 2015, as a freshman at Kansas, Weiman appeared in 21 games (seven starts), going 2–7 with a 6.75 ERA. As a sophomore in 2016, he became a full-time starter, appearing in 17 games in which he went 2–7 with a 6.82 ERA. In 2017, in Weiman's junior season, he moved to the bullpen where he greatly improved, pitching to a 5–1 record with a 2.80 ERA, striking out 55 batters in 45 relief innings pitched. After his junior year, he was drafted by the Pittsburgh Pirates in the eighth round of the 2017 Major League Baseball draft.

== Professional career ==
=== Pittsburgh Pirates ===
Weiman signed with Pittsburgh and made his professional debut with the West Virginia Black Bears of the Low–A New York–Penn League, going 4–3 with a 3.78 ERA in 21 relief appearances. He began the 2018 season with the West Virginia Power of the Single–A South Atlantic League and was promoted to the Bradenton Marauders of the High–A Florida State League and the Altoona Curve of the Double–A Eastern League during the year. In 67 relief innings pitched between the three clubs, he went 4–1 with a 2.42 ERA and 77 strikeouts. After the season, he played for the Surprise Saguaros of the Arizona Fall League and was named to the Fall Stars Game. Weiman was a non-roster invitee to 2019 spring training. He returned to Altoona to begin 2019 and was promoted to the Indianapolis Indians of the Triple–A International League in June after pitching to a 1.86 ERA over 19 1/3 relief innings. Over eight relief appearances with Indianapolis, Weiman went 0–1 with a 4.63 ERA. He missed nearly all of the last two months of the season due to injury.

Weiman did not play a minor league game in 2020 since the season was cancelled due to the COVID-19 pandemic. For the 2021 season, he returned to Indianapolis. He missed playing time in August due to injury. Over 35 relief appearances, Weiman went 5–0 with a 4.76 ERA and 45 strikeouts over 45 1/3 innings. He returned to the Indians to begin the 2022 season. On June 27, 2022, he was released.

=== Seattle Mariners ===
On July 6, 2022, the Seattle Mariners signed Weiman to a minor league contract and assigned him to the Double-A Arkansas Travelers. Over 33 relief appearances between the Indians and Travelers, he went 3–1 with a 4.47 ERA, 42 strikeouts, and six walks over 44 1/3 innings. Weiman elected free agency following the season on November 10.

On December 5, 2022, Weiman re-signed with the Mariners on a minor league contract. Weiman spent the 2023 season with the Triple–A Tacoma Rainiers, making 44 appearances out of the bullpen and recording a 5.17 ERA with 53 strikeouts across 54 innings of work. Weiman elected free agency following the season on November 6.

=== Chicago Cubs ===
On February 2, 2024, Weiman signed a minor league contract with the Chicago Cubs. He spent the season with the Double-A Tennessee Smokies, also making one appearance for the Triple-A Iowa Cubs. In 42 appearances out of the bullpen for Tennessee, Weiman compiled a 4–0 record and 2.77 ERA with 52 strikeouts and seven saves across 48 2/3 innings pitched. He elected free agency following the season on November 4.

=== Houston Astros ===
On January 6, 2025, Weiman signed a minor league contract with the Houston Astros. He made 26 appearances for the Triple-A Sugar Land Space Cowboys, struggling to a 7.94 ERA and 2–1 record with 28 strikeouts across 28 1/3 innings pitched. Weiman was released by the Astros organization on August 4.

=== Los Angeles Angels ===
On February 23, 2026, Weiman signed a minor league contract with the Los Angeles Angels. He began the season on the 60-day injured list before he participated in a rehab assignment with the Arizona Complex League Angels before he was assigned to the Double-A Rocket City Trash Pandas. Across 14 games with Rocket City, he had a 1–0 record, a 2.30 ERA, three walks and 19 strikeouts across 15 2/3 innings.

On August 4, 2026, Weiman was selected to the 40–man roster and promoted to the major leagues for the first time. He made his MLB debut on August 7, against the Miami Marlins. Weiman pitched one scoreless inning in relief in which he gave up two hits in a 4-3 Angels victory. For the Angels, he made 18 relief appearances and finished the season with a 1–1 record, a 2.55 ERA, and 16 strikeouts across 17 2/3 innings pitched.
