= Tyler Bremner =

Canadian-American baseball player (born 2004)

Los Angeles Angels
- Pitcher
- Born: April 20, 2004 (age 22); San Diego, California, U.S.
- Bats: Right Throws: Right
- Stats at Baseball Reference

Tyler Bremner (born April 20, 2004) is a Canadian-American professional baseball pitcher in the Los Angeles Angels organization.

== Amateur career ==
Bremner attended Scripps Ranch High School in San Diego, California. As a senior he had a 0.90 earned run average (ERA) with 87 strikeouts in 54 1/3 innings. He committed to the University of California, Santa Barbara to play college baseball. He was not selected in the 2022 Major League Baseball draft and attended UC Santa Barbara.

As a freshman at UC Santa Barbara in 2023, Bremner pitched in 17 games with eight starts and went 5–4 with a 5.37 ERA and 80 strikeouts in 55 1/3 innings. As a sophomore in 2024, he was named to three All-American teams after going 11–1 with a 2.54 ERA and 104 strikeouts over 88 2/3 innings in 19 games and nine starts. After the season, Bremner played for the United States collegiate national team during the summer. Bremner entered his junior season in 2025 as a top prospect for the upcoming MLB draft. Over 14 starts for the season, he went 5-4 with a 3.49 ERA and 111 strikeouts over 77 1/3 innings.

== Professional career ==
Bremner was selected as the second overall pick by the Los Angeles Angels in the 2025 Major League Baseball draft. On July 18, 2025, Bremner signed with the Angels on a $7.69 million bonus.

Bremner made his professional debut in 2026 with the High-A Tri-City Dust Devils.

== Personal life ==
Both of Bremner's parents are from Ontario, Canada, and he holds Canadian citizenship. His mother died from breast cancer a month before he was selected by the Los Angeles Angels in the 2025 MLB draft.
