= Ryan Johnson (baseball) =

American baseball player (born 2002)

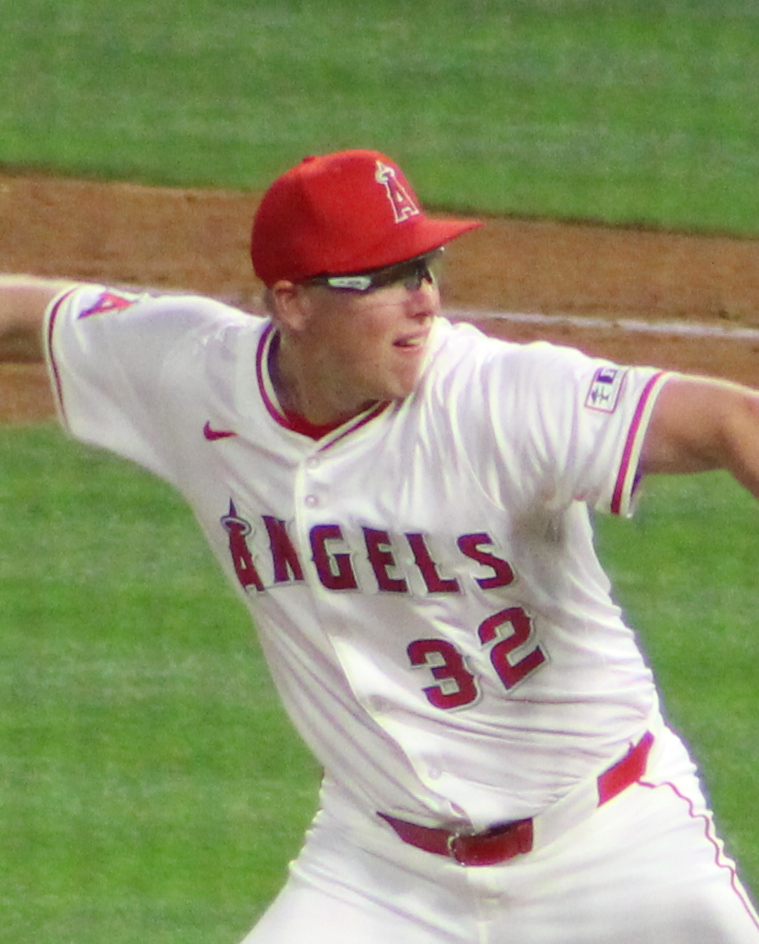
- Johnson with the Los Angeles Angels in 2025

Los Angeles Angels – No. 32
- Pitcher
- Born: August 5, 2002 (age 24); Dallas, Texas, U.S.
- Bats: Switch Throws: Right

MLB debut
- March 27, 2025, for the Los Angeles Angels

MLB statistics (through 2026 season)
- Win–loss record: 6–10
- Earned run average: 5.34
- Strikeouts: 95
- Stats at Baseball Reference

Teams
- Los Angeles Angels (2025–present)

Ryan Christopher Johnson (born August 5, 2002) is an American professional baseball pitcher for the Los Angeles Angels of Major League Baseball (MLB). He played college baseball for the Dallas Baptist Patriots. The Angels selected Johnson with the 74th pick, a compensatory pick, in the 2024 MLB draft. Johnson made his MLB debut in 2025, skipping the minor leagues.

== Early life ==
Ryan Christopher Johnson was born on August 5, 2002, in Dallas, Texas, to parents Jeff and Amy Johnson. Jeff pitched at Dallas Baptist from 1986 to 1990.

Johnson was homeschooled and played baseball for Christian Athletes Storm as part of the Home School Texas Alliance, where he was a four-year letterman. Perfect Game ranked Johnson as the tenth-best pitcher and fourth-best right-handed pitcher in Texas. He committed to play college baseball for the Dallas Baptist Patriots.

== College career ==
In his 2022 freshman season at Dallas Baptist, Johnson split time between the starting rotation and the bullpen. He earned his first career save on February 25 against the Sam Houston State Bearkats and his first career win on March 5 against the San Diego Toreros. On April 16, Johnson pitched five scoreless innings and earned a win against the Bradley Braves. On May 21, he worked 6 2/3 innings of shutout relief against the Indiana State Sycamores. He finished the season with a 3–2 record, 4.30 earned run average (ERA), and 47 strikeouts in 58 2/3 innings.

In 2023, Johnson began the season as the Patriots' Saturday starter. On March 15, he struck out nine batters and gave up two runs in six innings against the FIU Panthers. On March 24, Johnson became the team's Friday night starter, striking out 12 batters and allowing two runs in seven innings against the Charlotte 49ers. On the year, Johnson went 8–4 with a 4.43 ERA and a school-record 116 strikeouts in 87 1/3 innings.

== Professional career ==
The Los Angeles Angels selected Johnson 74th overall in the second round of the 2024 MLB draft, a compensatory pick awarded to the team due to the loss of Shohei Ohtani in free agency. He signed with the team for a $1.75 million bonus, above the league-recommended value of $1.06 million for the pick.

On March 25, 2025, Johnson made the Angels' Opening Day roster despite not playing in Minor League Baseball. He became the 24th player since the MLB draft was instituted in 1965, and the second Angel (the other being Jim Abbott), to be drafted and go directly to the major leagues without first playing in the minors. He was also tied with Cam Smith of the Houston Astros for the first player from the 2024 draft class to reach MLB. Johnson made his MLB debut for the Angels on March 27 versus the Chicago White Sox allowing five runs on four hits (including two home runs) in 1 2/3 innings.

== See also ==
- List of baseball players who went directly to Major League Baseball
