= Sam Bachman =

American baseball player (born 1999)

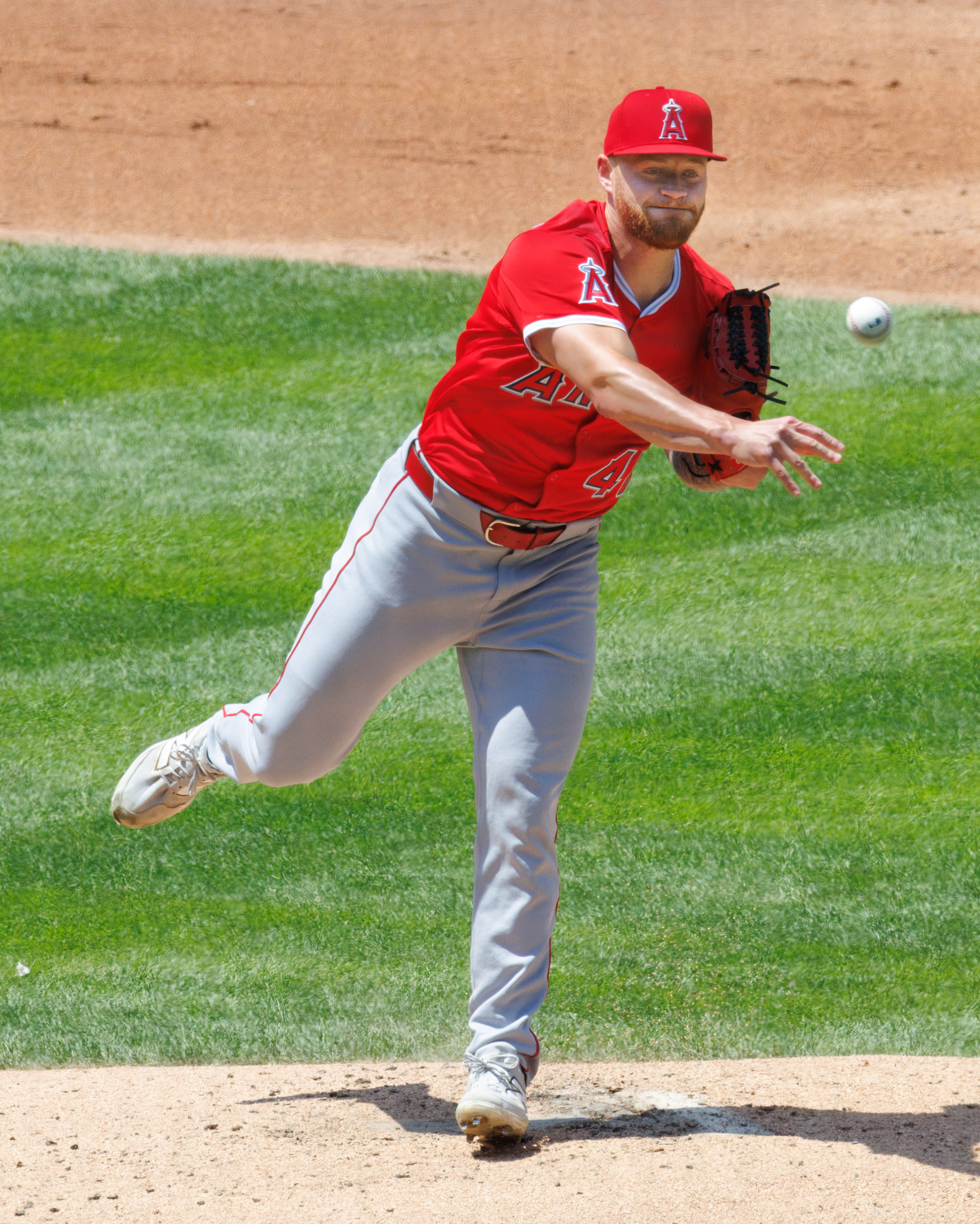
- Bachman with the Angels in 2025

Los Angeles Angels – No. 40
- Pitcher
- Born: September 30, 1999 (age 26); Indianapolis, Indiana, U.S.
- Bats: Right Throws: Right

MLB debut
- May 26, 2023, for the Los Angeles Angels

MLB statistics (through 2026 season)
- Win–loss record: 4–8
- Earned run average: 4.81
- Strikeouts: 81
- Stats at Baseball Reference

Teams
- Los Angeles Angels (2023, 2025–present)

Samuel Duane Bachman (born September 30, 1999) is an American professional baseball pitcher for the Los Angeles Angels of Major League Baseball (MLB). He played college baseball for the Miami RedHawks, and was selected by the Angels in the first round of the 2021 MLB draft. He made his MLB debut in 2023.

== Amateur career ==
Bachman grew up in Fishers, Indiana, and attended Hamilton Southeastern High School.

Bachman attended Miami University and played college baseball for the Miami RedHawks. He joined the RedHawks' starting rotation going into his freshman season and had a 7–1 win–loss record with 3.93 earned run average (ERA) and 75 strikeouts in 75 2/3 innings pitched. His average fastball increased during his college career from 91 to 100 miles per hour (146 to 161 km/h). Bachman had an 3.42 ERA with 31 strikeouts in 23 2/3 innings pitched before the season was cut short due to the coronavirus pandemic. Bachman was projected to be a first round selection in the 2021 Major League Baseball draft going into his junior season. Bachman went 4–4 in his junior season with a 1.81 ERA and 93 strikeouts in 59 2/3 innings pitched and was named first team All-Mid-American Conference.

== Professional career ==
The Los Angeles Angels selected Bachman in the first round, with the ninth overall pick, in the 2021 Major League Baseball draft. On July 21, 2021, he signed with the Angels for a $3.85 million bonus. Bachman was assigned to the High-A Tri-City Dust Devils to start his professional career. Over 14 1/3 innings, he went 0–2 with a 3.77 ERA and 15 strikeouts.

Bachman began the 2022 season on the injured list with back spasms. He was assigned to the Double-A Rocket City Trash Pandas upon being activated. After missing two months with a biceps issue, Bachman ended the year making 12 starts and registering a 3.92 ERA with 30 strikeouts in 43 2/3 innings pitched.

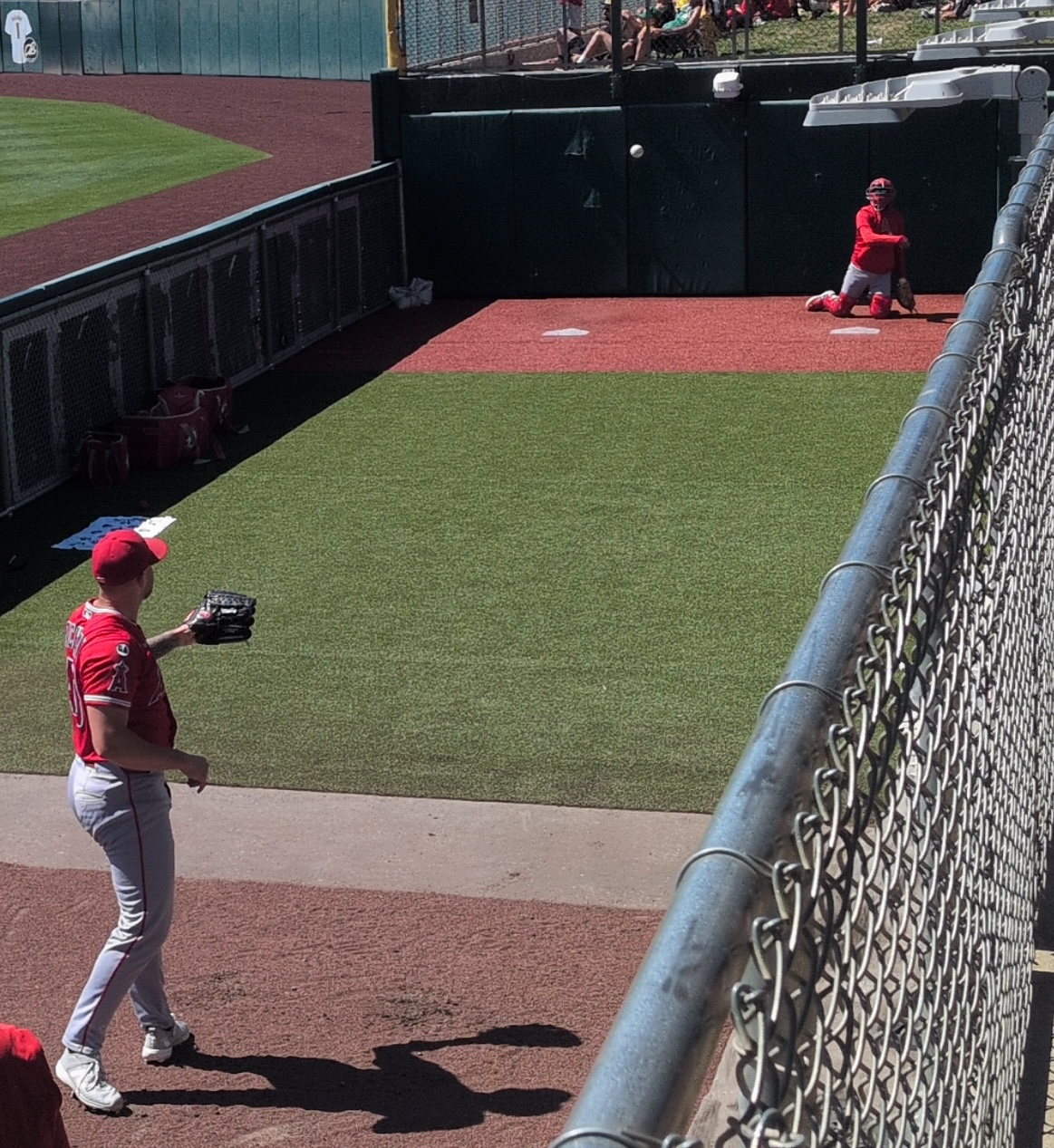
Sam Bachman practices in the dugout at Sutter Health Park (2026)

Bachman returned to Rocket City in 2023, making 6 starts and struggling to a 3–2 record and 5.81 ERA with 29 strikeouts in 26 1/3 innings pitched. On May 26, Bachman was promoted to the major leagues for the first time. He made his major league debut that night against the Miami Marlins, pitching two innings in relief. After 11 games for the Angels, he was placed on the injured list with right shoulder inflammation on July 14. Bachman was transferred to the 60–day injured list on August 1.

Bachman was placed on the 60–day injured list to begin the 2024 season as he recovered from offseason shoulder surgery. He was activated from the injured list and optioned to Double–A Rocket City on June 14, 2024.

Bachman was placed on the injured list to begin the 2025 season after being diagnosed with thoracic outlet syndrome. He was recalled to the team's active roster on June 13, 2025.
