= Logan O'Hoppe =

American baseball player (born 2000)

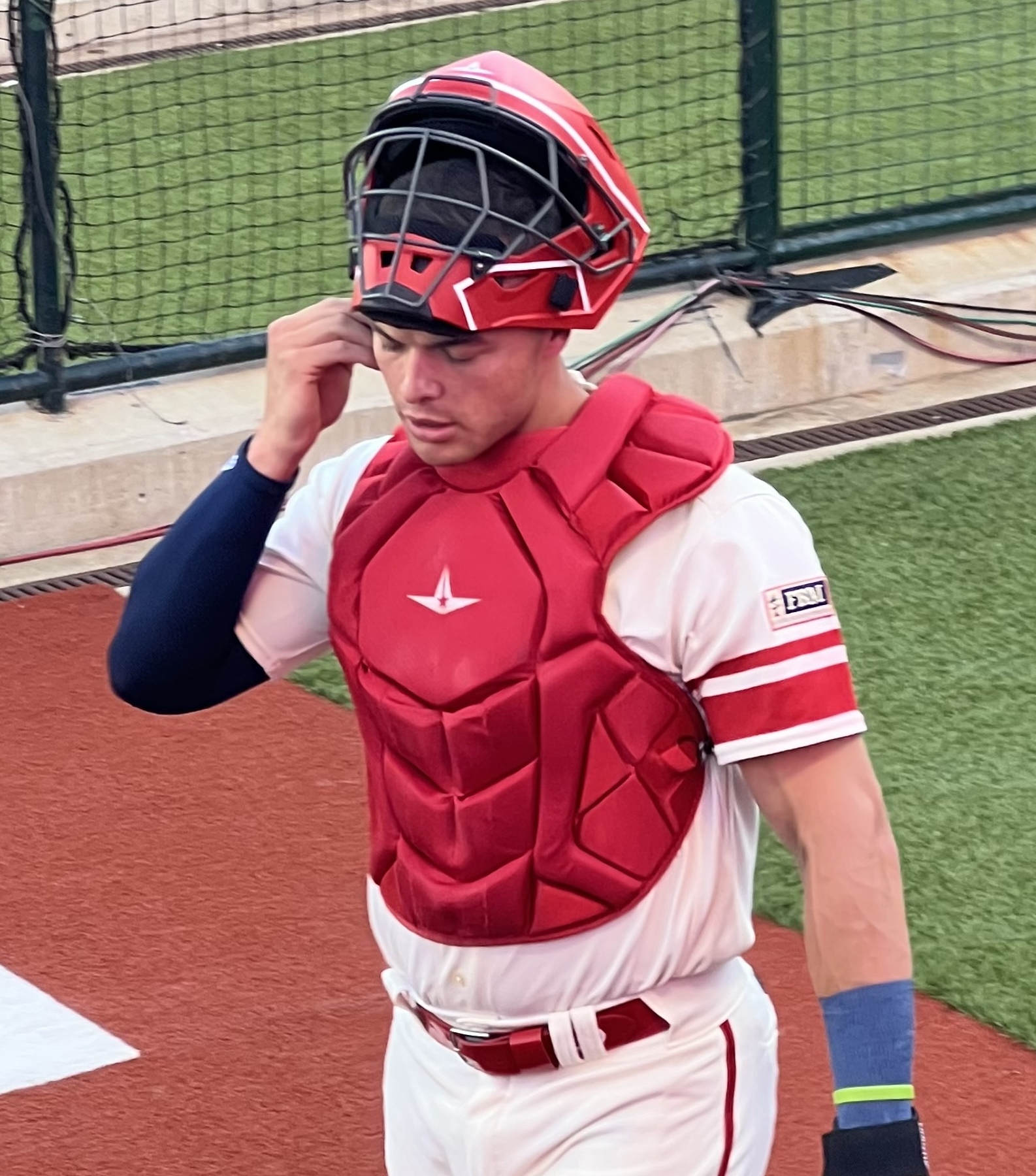
- O'Hoppe with the Los Angeles Angels in 2023

Texas Rangers – No. 4
- Catcher
- Born: February 9, 2000 (age 26); West Islip, New York, U.S.
- Bats: Right Throws: Right

MLB debut
- September 28, 2022, for the Los Angeles Angels

MLB statistics (through 2026 season)
- Batting average: .229
- Home runs: 57
- Runs batted in: 154
- Stats at Baseball Reference

Teams
- Los Angeles Angels (2022–2026); Texas Rangers (2026–present)

Logan O'Hoppe (/oʊˈhɒpiː/ oh-HOP-ee; born February 9, 2000) is an American professional baseball catcher for the Texas Rangers of Major League Baseball (MLB). He has previously played in MLB for the Los Angeles Angels.

O'Hoppe was born in West Islip, New York, and attended St. John the Baptist Diocesan High School, committing to play college baseball for East Carolina University. He forewent his college commitment when he was drafted by the Philadelphia Phillies in the 23rd round of the 2018 Major League Baseball draft. O'Hoppe spent his first five professional seasons in the Phillies farm system, garnering media consideration as one of the team's top prospects. In August 2022, O'Hoppe was traded to the Angels at the trade deadline and he made his MLB debut the next month. He was traded to the Rangers in July 2026.

== Early life ==
Logan O'Hoppe was born on February 9, 2000, in West Islip, New York, and grew up on Long Island in Sayville, New York. O'Hoppe was born into a baseball-oriented family; his childhood home had a batting cage in the backyard and he practiced there with his father from a young age. He played travel baseball in his youth and trained with his father. He grew up attending games at Yankee Stadium in nearby New York City and idolized Derek Jeter as his favorite player.

O'Hoppe attended St. John the Baptist Diocesan High School in West Islip. In 2018, O'Hoppe's senior season, he posted a .467 batting average with three home runs and 22 runs batted in (RBI) in 21 games. He was named the Catholic High School Athletic Association Player of the Year after winning the Triple Crown and leading St. John to its first league championship since 2014. He was later awarded a high-school-level Gold Glove Award, recognizing his defensive abilities behind the plate as the best in the country. After spending three years as the starting catcher for St. John, O'Hoppe finished his high school career batting .434 with five home runs and 43 RBIs. He committed to play college baseball for East Carolina University, his father's alma mater.

== Professional career ==
=== Philadelphia Phillies organization ===
The Philadelphia Phillies selected O'Hoppe in the 23rd round of the 2018 Major League Baseball draft, the 677th overall pick. He signed with the team for $215,000, forgoing his commitment to play for the East Carolina Pirates. O'Hoppe made his professional debut in the Rookie-level Gulf Coast League (GCL) with the GCL Phillies. In his first game, O'Hoppe went 1-for-2 with a walk and a run. He spent the rest of 2018 in the GCL, finishing with a .367 batting average, two home runs, and 21 RBIs in 34 games.

At the start of the 2019 season, O'Hoppe was promoted to the Low-A Williamsport Crosscutters of the New York–Penn League (NYPL). Midway through the season, he was selected to play in the NYPL All-Star game. During the game on August 21, he went 0-for-1 in a pinch hit appearance. He finished the season batting .216 with five home runs and 26 RBIs over 45 games. After the season, O'Hoppe played overseas for the Adelaide Giants of the Australian Baseball League, a non-MLB affiliate. In 28 games with the Giants, O'Hoppe batted .258 with five home runs and 18 RBIs.

In 2020, O'Hoppe did not play any official games due to the COVID-19-related cancellation of the minor league season. In lieu of minor league play, O'Hoppe was among a group of Phillies prospects invited to the team's alternate training site as a member of the 60-man player pool. Phillies farm director Josh Bonifay praised O'Hoppe's work at the site, saying that he had improved his bat-to-ball skills.

O'Hoppe started 2021 with the High-A Jersey Shore BlueClaws of the High-A East league. In 85 games with Jersey Shore, O'Hoppe batted .270 with 13 home runs and 48 RBIs. On August 25, he was promoted to the Double-A Reading Fightin Phils of the Double-A Northeast league. In 13 games with Reading, he batted .296 with three home runs and seven RBIs. On September 22, O'Hoppe was promoted to the Triple-A Lehigh Valley IronPigs of the Triple-A East league. He spent his final six games of the season with Lehigh Valley, going 4-for-21 (.191) with a home run and three RBIs. Between the three teams, O'Hoppe finished the 2021 season batting .270 with 17 home runs and 58 RBIs in 104 games. Following the season, O'Hoppe played for the Peoria Javelinas of the Arizona Fall League (AFL), batting .299 with three home runs and 17 RBIs in 22 games. He won the AFL's Dernell Stenson Award for sportsmanship.

O'Hoppe returned to Reading to open the 2022 season. During an MLB Pipeline re-rank of the Phillies farm system, O'Hoppe moved up from his #11 position in 2021 to #3 in 2022. In mid-June, O'Hoppe appeared on Pipeline's league-wide top 100 prospect ranking for the first time, moving in after Minnesota Twins infielder José Miranda graduated from his prospect status. On July 16, O'Hoppe played in the All-Star Futures Game at Dodger Stadium, going 0-for-1 at the plate. Through 75 games with Reading, O'Hoppe was batting .275 with 15 home runs and 45 RBIs.

=== Los Angeles Angels ===
On August 2, 2022, O'Hoppe was traded to the Los Angeles Angels in exchange for outfielder Brandon Marsh. After the trade, MLB Pipeline ranked O'Hoppe as the Angels' top prospect and promoted him to #67 on the league-wide ranking.

The Angels assigned O'Hoppe to the Double-A Rocket City Trash Pandas of the Southern League. In his first seven games with the team, he hit five home runs. In 29 total games, O'Hoppe batted .306 with 11 home runs, 33 RBIs, and a 1.147 on-base plus slugging (OPS), the highest in his time as a prospect. During the Southern League postseason, he went 2-for-10 (.200) with an RBI in three games. After the conclusion of the minor league season, Keith Law of The Athletic ranked O'Hoppe as the 2022 Prospect of the Year.

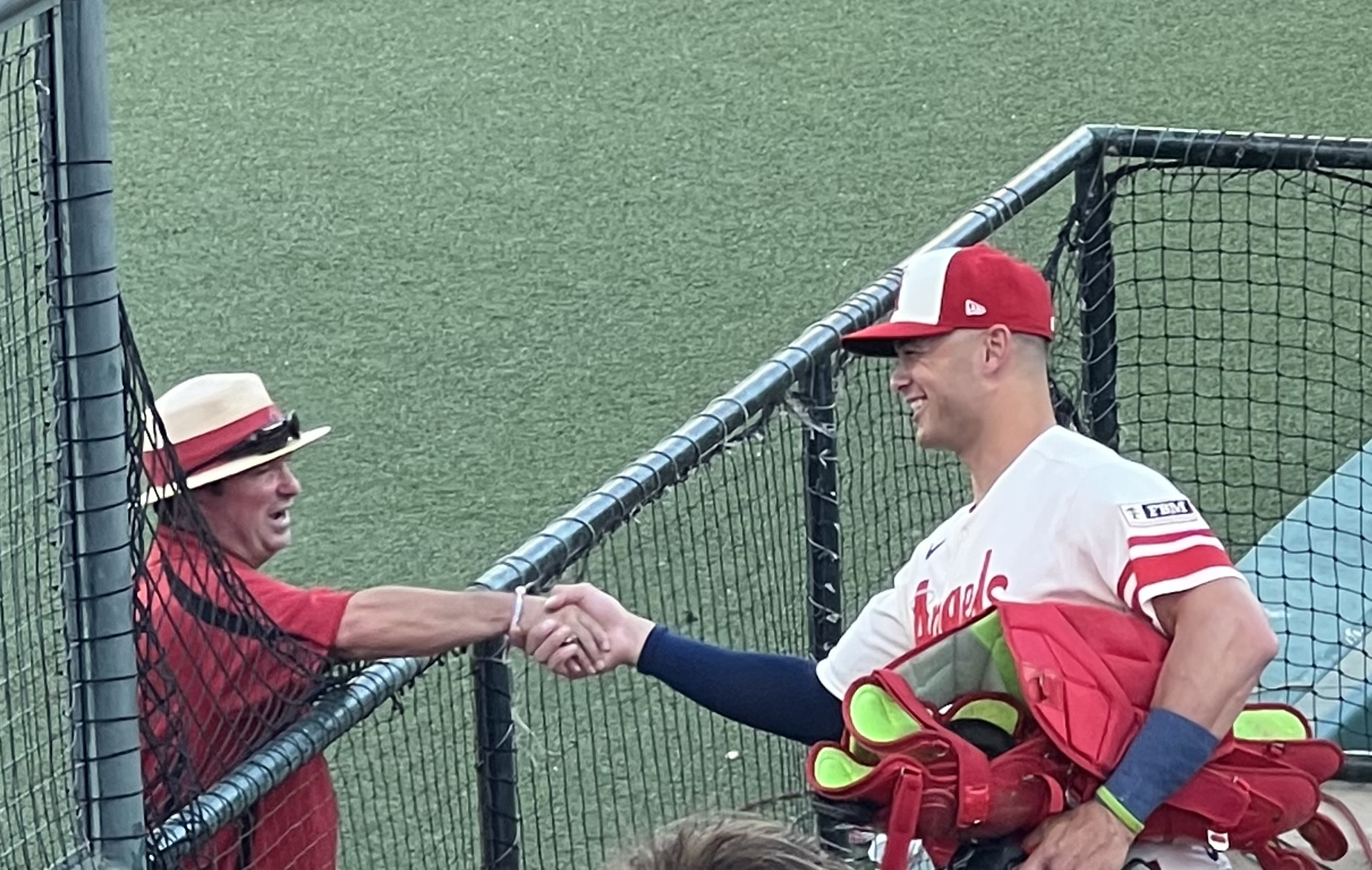
O'Hoppe shaking the hand of an Angel Stadium usher, 2023

On September 27, the Angels added O'Hoppe to their taxi squad and announced his promotion to the major leagues later that evening. He made his debut on September 28, starting at catcher and recording his first major league hit off of Oakland Athletics pitcher Adrián Martínez in his first career at bat. In his brief first season, he batted .286 with two RBIs in five games.

In March 2023, O'Hoppe was announced as the Opening Day starting catcher for the Angels, as veteran Max Stassi began the season on the injured list. On April 2, O'Hoppe hit his first major league home run, a three-run shot off Athletics pitcher Ken Waldichuk. On April 17, O'Hoppe injured his shoulder while swinging during an at-bat at Fenway Park but continued playing; he further injured it while swinging during an April 20 at-bat at Yankee Stadium, resulting in his placement on the 10-day injured list the following day. On April 23, it was announced that O'Hoppe had suffered a torn labrum in his left (non-throwing) shoulder that would require surgery and a 4-6 month recovery timetable. On August 18, he was activated from the injured list. O'Hoppe went 0-for-5 in his first game back from injury but tagged out Yandy Díaz at home plate to complete a triple play. It was the first 6–4–3–2 triple play in MLB since 1971 and the first triple play of any variety for the Angels since 1997. In September, O'Hoppe hit nine home runs. He finished his rookie season batting .236 with 14 home runs and 29 RBIs in 51 games. As a Major League catcher, O'Hoppe's 2.09-second pop time was ranked 81st among 81 MLB catchers in the 2023 season.

On June 9, 2024, O'Hoppe recorded five hits and three runs and hit the first walk-off home run of his career to aid the Angels in a comeback victory against the Houston Astros. (Note: The scorekeeper of the game initially credited O'Hoppe with four hits, but a scoring change at a later date gave him a fifth hit.) During a game against the Texas Rangers on July 9, O'Hoppe went 3-for-4 with two game-tying home runs off Max Scherzer; all three hits came on the first pitch of each at-bat.

=== Texas Rangers ===
On July 29, 2026, the Angels traded O'Hoppe to the Texas Rangers, along with Chase Silseth, in exchange for Angel Arredondo.

== Player profile ==
As a prospect in 2022, MLB.com rated O'Hoppe on its 20–80 scale with a 50 for hitting, 55 for power, 30 for baserunning, 55 for arm strength, 55 for fielding, and 55 overall. The report noted that he lowered his strikeout rate and increased his walk rate, allowing him to "tap into his raw power more consistently" and giving him the possibility of hitting "20 homers annually in the future." The report described him as a "very capable defender" and projected him to be a major league starter.

== Personal life ==
O'Hoppe attended a game at Yankee Stadium while still in high school in 2018 and was televised on YES Network catching a home run hit by Baltimore Orioles infielder Manny Machado. O'Hoppe threw the ball back onto the field from his second-deck seat, a common gesture among fans who catch visiting team home runs, and it landed near the infield.

O'Hoppe's father, Michael, was diagnosed with non-Hodgkin lymphoma in August 2021. After multiple rounds of chemotherapy, Michael was determined to be cancer-free in April 2022.

The O'Hoppe family was present at Angel Stadium for Logan's MLB debut in September 2022.
