= Frank Tanana =

American baseball player (born 1953)

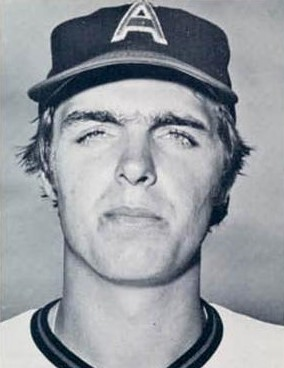
- Tanana with the California Angels in 1974
- Pitcher
- Born: July 3, 1953 (age 73); Detroit, Michigan, U.S.
- Batted: Left Threw: Left

MLB debut
- September 9, 1973, for the California Angels

Last MLB appearance
- October 1, 1993, for the New York Yankees

MLB statistics
- Win–loss record: 240–236
- Earned run average: 3.66
- Strikeouts: 2,773
- Stats at Baseball Reference

Teams
- California Angels (1973–1980); Boston Red Sox (1981); Texas Rangers (1982–1985); Detroit Tigers (1985–1992); New York Mets (1993); New York Yankees (1993)

Career highlights and awards
- 3× All-Star (1976–1978); AL ERA leader (1977); MLB strikeout leader (1975)

Frank Daryl Tanana (born July 3, 1953) is an American former professional baseball left-handed pitcher. In a Major League Baseball career that stretched from 1973 to 1993, he pitched for the California Angels, Boston Red Sox, Texas Rangers, Detroit Tigers, New York Mets, and New York Yankees. He struck out 2,773 batters in his career. He won playoff-clinching games for the teams he was on twice: once for the Angels in 1979, and once for the Tigers in 1987.

Raised in northwest Detroit, Tanana was a first-round draft pick by the Angels in 1971. He made his debut with the team in 1973 and won 14 games his rookie year. Tanana and fellow starter Nolan Ryan formed one of the toughest pairs of starting pitchers to hit against in baseball. Tanana led the American League (AL) in strikeouts in 1975, then made the AL All-Star team three years in a row. He won 19 games in 1976 and led the AL with a 2.54 earned run average (ERA) in 1977. In 1979, he won the game that clinched the Angels' first-ever playoff appearance. Injuries began to take their toll on him by the end of his tenure with the Angels, and he changed his style from relying on a hard fastball to throwing a repertoire of slower pitches, using deception to get hitters out instead.

Tanana was traded to Boston for the 1981 season; he went 4–10 with the Red Sox before becoming a free agent and signing with the Rangers. He tied for the AL lead in losses his first year with Texas, then failed to make their starting rotation at the beginning of the 1983 season, though he returned to it in June. In 1984, he had a 15–15 record for the team, his most wins since 1978. After getting off to a poor start with Texas in 1985, he was traded to Detroit, the team he rooted for growing up. Tanana would stay with the Tigers through 1992, pitching eight seasons with the club. He threw a shutout in the final game of the 1987 season to clinch a playoff spot for the team, winning 15 games that year. In 1988, he won 14 games; in 1989, he posted a 3.58 ERA. He was removed from the rotation for a time in 1990, only winning nine games that year, but the next season, he became the Tigers' first pitcher besides Jack Morris to start on Opening Day since 1979. This was the fifth Opening Day start of Tanana's career, as he had made four for the Angels in the 1970s. He won 13 games apiece in 1991 and 1992 before pitching one more season with the Mets and the Yankees in 1993.

After becoming a born-again Christian in November 1983, Tanana became a leader among baseball's Christian community. He has continued to serve in the ministry following his retirement, serving as an elder in his church, assisting the Tigers' chaplain, and performing Bible studies and marriage counseling. He lives in Farmington Hills, Michigan.

== Early life ==
Tanana grew up in the northwest part of Detroit, Michigan. His father, also named Frank, had played professional baseball in the 1950s and was on the 1955 Eastern League championship team, the Reading Indians, before he left baseball and joined the Detroit Police Department to support his family. After young Frank got done with homework, he and his friends would spend the rest of the afternoon playing various sports. He rooted for the hometown Detroit Tigers growing up, listing Al Kaline, Mickey Lolich, Willie Horton, and Mickey Stanley among his favorite players.

Tanana attended Detroit Catholic Central High School, an all-boys school; though it was seven miles from his home, he was attracted to it after seeing their basketball team featured on the front page of a newspaper sports section. He made all-state twice in basketball, but it was in baseball he excelled, as he had a 32–1 record in his high school career. In a cocky moment his senior year, he threw sidearm to a hitter and injured his shoulder. He pitched through the injury for the rest of the year until leaving the mound after the fourth inning of the championship game, when the pain got to be too much for him. Thinking the injury would hurt his baseball chances, he had just about decided to attend Duke University on a basketball scholarship when the California Angels made him their first-round draft pick in 1971.

== Minor league career ==
Tanana was assigned to the Idaho Falls Angels of the rookie-level Pioneer League in 1971, but tendinitis in his shoulder prevented him from pitching. Instead, he received cortisone treatments. "I tell you, I didn't have many friends on that team," Tanana said. "Here were guys being cut off the team, and I, who couldn't throw, was staying because I had this bonus." Arm feeling better in 1972, he pitched for the Single-A Quad Cities Angels, posting a 7–2 record. In 1973, he spent most of the season with the Double-A El Paso Sun Kings. "He struck out 14 in his first game for us," El Paso (and later Angel) manager Norm Sherry said. "Right then, I knew he could pitch." Tanana also pitched a couple games for the Triple-A Salt Lake City Angels before getting called up in September and added to the Angels starting rotation.

== Major league career ==
=== California Angels ===
Along with Nolan Ryan, Tanana anchored the pitching staff of the California Angels from 1973 to 1979. This led to the saying, "Tanana and Ryan and two days of cryin'", an indication of just how much the two meant to the rotation. (This was a variation on "Spahn and Sain, then pray for rain," referring to the pitchers of the Boston Braves of the late 1940s.) The duo were considered two of the toughest pitching teammates in history, drawing comparisons to Sandy Koufax and Don Drysdale of the Los Angeles Dodgers. Tanana described pitching with Ryan as "exciting," saying, "He was just an amazing athlete, and you know we both wanted to be the best pitcher on the team, so it was good for both of us—that good, healthy competition. We had a wonderful staff."

Tanana made four starts with the Angels in September 1973. His major league debut was September 9, in the second game of a doubleheader against the Kansas City Royals. Tanana only lasted four innings, giving up four runs and taking the loss. His next start, on September 14, also was against Kansas City—Tanana threw a complete game this time, only allowing two runs (one earned) to earn his first major league victory. He threw a complete game shutout in the Angels' last game of the year on September 30, allowing just two hits in a 3–0 win over the Minnesota Twins.

In his first full season, Tanana was named the Angels' number two starter, behind Ryan. An elbow injury during the season caused Tanana to lose seven games in a row at one point; Tanana could not remember losing more than two games in a row before in his career. "My confidence was taking a beating, but I knew it wouldn't last forever," he said. After losing his 19th game September 22, Tanana was in danger of losing 20 games his rookie season, as there were still seven games to go. In his next start, September 27, he gave up two runs and was losing until pinch-hitter Doug Howard drove in two runs in the seventh inning to give him and the Angels a 3–2 victory over the Minnesota Twins. Then, in the last game of the year against the Oakland Athletics, he threw a shutout in a 2–0 victory. In 39 games (35 starts) his rookie year, Tanana had a 14–19 record, a 3.12 earned run average (ERA), 12 complete games (four shutouts), and 180 strikeouts in 268 2/3 innings pitched. The 180 strikeouts were seventh in the American League (AL) (teammate Ryan led the league with 367), the four shutouts were tied for sixth (with five other pitchers), and Tanana did not lead the league in losses, as four other pitchers tied him for third behind Lolich (21) and Clyde Wright (20).

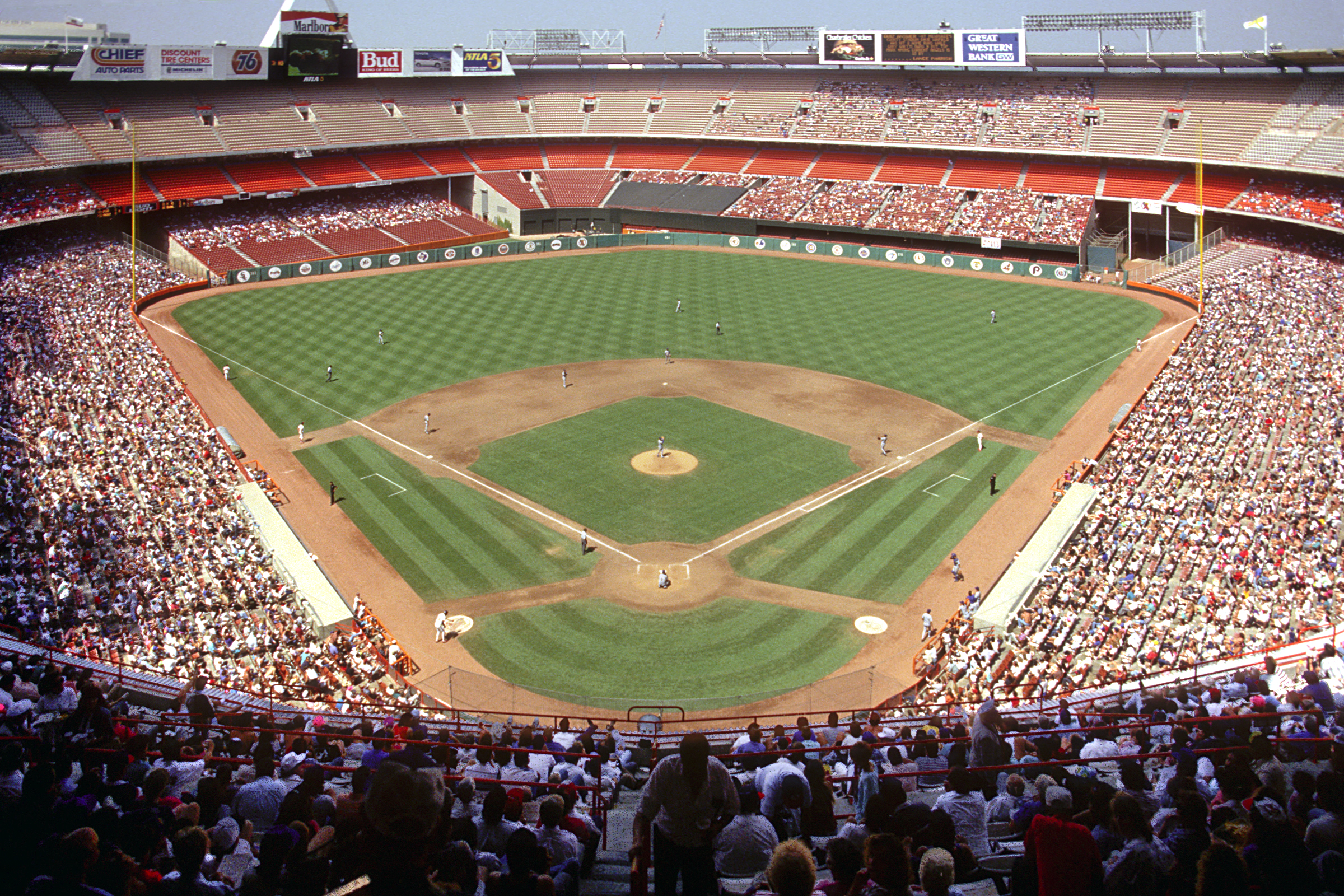
Anaheim Stadium was the site of Tanana's home games when he was with the Angels

In the first game of a doubleheader on June 21, 1975, Tanana struck out 17 batters in a 4–2 victory over the Texas Rangers, becoming the first left-hander in AL history to have that many strikeouts in a game. "Everybody stood up and applauded for me in the ninth inning," he remembered. "I felt invincible." He threw 13 shutout innings on September 22 against the Chicago White Sox, yet left with a no decision because neither Jim Kaat nor Rich Gossage had allowed a run thus far—the game would go to 16 innings before the Angels eventually won 3–0. Tanana struck out 13. At season's end, Tanana's 269 strikeouts led the American League; it would be the only time from 1972 to 1979 that anyone other than teammate Ryan, injured that year, led the AL in strikeouts. Tanana placed fourth in ERA (2.62), tied for third with three others with five shutouts, and had a 16–9 record on the season. He and Kaat tied for fourth in AL Cy Young Award voting after the season.

With Ryan coming off a year in which he had missed time with injury, Tanana was named the Angels' Opening Day starter for 1976. As it turned out, 1976 would be the first of four straight Opening Day starts for Tanana. He was named an All-Star for the first time in 1976. The Angels' offense did not always score a lot for him; on August 27, 1976, he and Catfish Hunter of the New York Yankees each pitched 13 scoreless innings in a game where both men received a no-decision. It was the second year in a row Tanana had thrown 13 scoreless innings without getting a decision, but the Angels would lose this one in 15, 5–0. At season's end, he was among the league leaders once again in wins (19, tied with Mark Fidrych and Ed Figueroa for fourth), ERA (2.43, behind Fidrych's 2.34 and Vida Blue's 2.35), strikeouts (261, second to a healthy Ryan's 327), and complete games (23, tied with Jim Palmer for second behind Fidrych's 24). With a 19–10 record, he came close to winning twenty games, missing the mark because of a midseason injury and also an August 22 outing against the Yankees where, having allowed only two hits going into the ninth, he started taking it easy, gave up six runs and was removed, and received a no decision, though the Angels eventually won 11–8 in eleven. As it turned out, 19 wins would be his career high. He came in third in Cy Young voting behind Palmer and Fidrych and also got votes for the AL Most Valuable Player (MVP) award.

For the second year in a row, Tanana made the All-Star Game in 1977. In July, Sports Illustrated forecasted that he might reach 25 wins on the season. From April 29 through July 3, he threw 14 straight complete games. Shortly after the streak, though, he got an inflamed tendon in his left arm and had to be shut down for almost two weeks. After he returned, his arm was still tired, and the Angels had to shut him down for the rest of the year after September 5. Still, United Press International called the 1977 season his best year. He led the AL in earned run average (ERA) (2.54) and shutouts (7) while posting a 15–9 record. His 205 strikeouts were good for third in the league, behind Ryan's 341 and Dennis Leonard's 244. He finished ninth in Cy Young voting after the season.

Tanana started the 1978 season strong, with a 1–0 shutout of Oakland on Opening Day. He was named to the All-Star Game for the third year in a row. Through the end of July, he had a 14–6 record and a 2.99 ERA. However, his numbers were not as good in his final 11 starts; though his record was 4–6, his ERA hopped up to 5.22. Still, Tanana finished the year with an 18–12 record, tying with Lary Sorensen and Fergie Jenkins for ninth in the AL in wins. He threw ten complete games and tied with four others for fifth in the league in shutouts, with four. His 3.65 ERA was the highest of his career at the time, though, and his strikeout total dropped to 137, even though he threw 239 innings.

By the end of 1978, Tanana had stopped throwing as hard, relying on changing speeds of his pitches to get hitters out instead of a devastating fastball. Though he had recovered from the tendinitis that had plagued him in 1977, fear of the pain coming back caused him to alter his delivery and go with a slower approach. After giving up six runs in two innings on June 10, 1979, against the Detroit Tigers, Tanana was shut down for a couple months with shoulder tendinitis. The injury kept him out two months of the 1979 season with a shoulder injury, but through intensive therapy, he was able to pitch in September. Limited to 18 games (17 starts), he had a 7–5 record, a 3.89 ERA, and 46 strikeouts in 90 1/3 innings.

For the first time in Tanana's career, as well as in California's history, the Angels made the playoffs, winning the AL West, with Tanana allowing one run in a complete game against the Royals on September 25 to clinch the division for the team. Tanana started Game 3 of the AL Championship Series (ALCS) against the Baltimore Orioles, limiting them to one run through five innings. He was taken out in the sixth, though, after giving up two straight singles and a walk to open the frame. Don Aase came in and got three straight outs, but the first was a sacrifice fly off the bat of Doug DeCinces that scored a run, tying the game for the Orioles and making Tanana ineligible for the win. The Angels ultimately prevailed 4–3, but that would be their only win of the series, as Baltimore beat them in four games.

Tanana slipped to fifth in the Angels' starting rotation in 1980. After going 2–6 through the month of May, he had his turn in the rotation skipped at the beginning of June. Through June 4, he had a 7.93 ERA. After that, he pitched better for the rest of the year, with his ERA going down to 3.33 in his last 23 starts. In 32 games (31 starts), Tanana had an 11–12 record, a 4.15 ERA, and 113 strikeouts in 204 innings pitched.

=== Boston Red Sox ===
On January 23, 1981, the Angels traded Tanana to the Boston Red Sox along with Jim Dorsey and Joe Rudi for Steve Renko and Fred Lynn (who the Red Sox worried they would lose to free agency because of paperwork errors). "I stunk," Tanana summarized his performance for Boston. He pitched for the Red Sox for a single season, earning only 4 victories against 10 losses (the 10 losses tied with five others for 8th in the AL in a strike-shortened season). While his 4.01 ERA was better than the previous season, he struggled to pitch at Fenway Park, where he had a 5.36 ERA. "Anything can happen in this ballpark, like in a pinball game," he later described Fenway. He would have finished 3–10, but he threw a shutout against the Cleveland Indians on October 3 in his last start of the year (at Cleveland Stadium, not Fenway). Despite the finish, he was granted free agency by the Red Sox on November 13, 1981.

=== Texas Rangers ===
Tanana signed as a free agent with Texas Rangers on January 6, 1982. His contract was for $375,000 a year for two years, plus a $75,000 signing bonus. His first season with the Rangers, his ERA went up to 4.21, only 0.20 higher than his previous season with the Red Sox. However, the Rangers lost 98 games, and Tanana was responsible for 18 of those, tying with Matt Keough for the AL lead in losses while only earning seven wins.

For the first time in his career in 1983, Tanana was not a part of his team's starting rotation, opening the season as a long reliever for the Rangers. He had a 1.57 ERA in eight games, though, and returned to the rotation June 10, allowing one run and three hits in six innings in a 4–2 victory over the Twins. Through August 22, he had a 7–4 record, but he went on a five-game losing streak to end the year, finishing 7–9. He appeared in 29 games (22 starts), had a 3.16 ERA, and struck out 108 in 159 1/3 innings.

Back in the rotation for good in 1984, Tanana had his best season since 1978 for a Rangers team that finished in last place in its division. He threw eight shutout innings April 21 in a 1–0 victory over the Yankees, then threw his first shutout since 1981 on June 13 in a 3–0 victory over the Twins. He finished the season with a 15–15 record, a 3.25 ERA, and 141 strikeouts in 246 1/3 innings pitched.

1985 did not start well for Tanana, as he posted a 2–7 record with a 5.91 ERA through his first 13 starts. Teammates were sympathetic—"He hasn't pitched the way he's capable of pitching, and we haven't played as well as we're capable of playing behind him," assessed fellow starter Charlie Hough. Tanana himself was more critical of his performance: "Awful. Absolutely awful." He was traded by the Rangers to the Detroit Tigers for minor-league pitcher Duane James on June 20, 1985.

While with the Rangers, Tanana served as the team's player representative.

=== Detroit Tigers ===
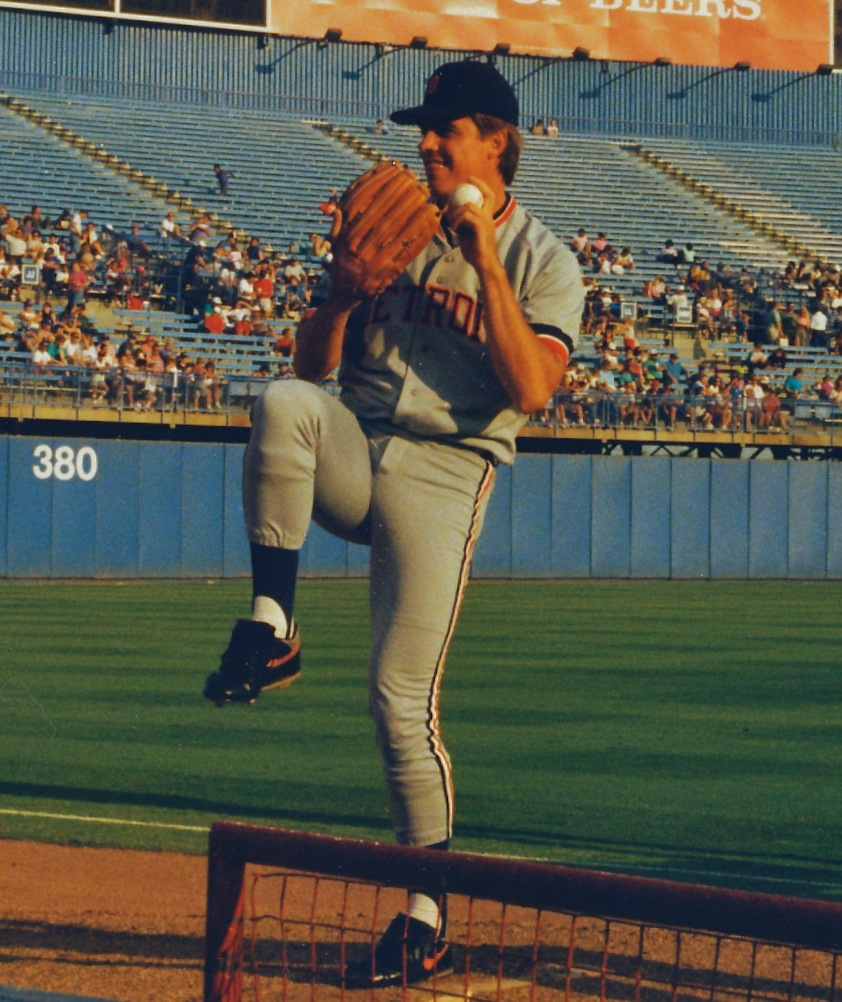
Tanana warms up at Arlington Stadium, 1992

"It was a wonderful gift from the Lord," Tanana said of getting to come play with the Tigers. "I was raised here and to have the opportunity to play for the Tigers was a dream come true."

Tanana threw seven shutout innings in his debut with the Tigers June 23, 1985, helping Detroit beat the Yankees 3–1. His ERA went down with Detroit, and he won each of his last five starts. In 20 starts for Detroit, Tanana had a 10–7 record, a 3.34 ERA, and 107 strikeouts in 130 1/3 innings pitched. In a combined 33 starts between Texas and Detroit, he had a 12–14 record, a 4.27 ERA, and 159 strikeouts in 215 innings.

On May 29, 1986, Tanana allowed one run against the Twins, coming within one out of a complete game before getting pulled in favor of Willie Hernández after allowing a double and a walk with two outs in the ninth. Twice that year, he had ten-strikeout games—the first in a 14–0 shutout of the Seattle Mariners on August 23, and the second in only seven innings on September 25, though Tanana allowed four runs and took the loss to the Toronto Blue Jays that day. In 32 games (31 starts), he had a 12–9 record, a 4.16 ERA, and 119 strikeouts in 188 1/3 innings.

In the last year of his contract in 1987, Tanana made $662,500. He picked up his 2,000th strikeout July 12 against the Angels, though the milestone came in a 5–4 loss. Through August 6, he had a 3.40 ERA, but he struggled after that, posting a 9.00 ERA in his next eight starts and prompting manager Sparky Anderson to take him out of the rotation in September. However, Tanana only missed one start before rejoining the rotation with the Tigers in the middle of a pennant race. On the final day of the 1987 season, Tanana pitched a 1–0 shutout over second-place Toronto to clinch the American League East title for the Tigers. As the final out was recorded, a jubilant Anderson rushed to the mound, embracing and kissing his pitcher. "That game was probably the highlight of my career,” Tanana said. He went 15–7 in 34 starts as he helped the Tigers win the division, posting a 3.91 ERA and striking out 146 in 218 2/3 innings pitched.

The Tigers faced the Twins in the ALCS; in Game 4, Tanana was matched up against Frank Viola. He allowed six hits over 5 1/3 innings, walking four batters and giving up four runs (three earned) in a 4–3 defeat. The Twins won the series in five games.

After the 1987 season, Tanana went to arbitration with the Tigers. Seeking a two-year contract initially, Tanana ultimately received a one-year, $1.1 million deal, $300,000 more than the Tigers had wanted to pay him. Tanana won eight of his first ten decisions in 1988, matching the best start of his career (he also won eight of his first ten decisions in 1977 and 1978). His only two complete games of the year came in back-to-back starts, a win against Texas on July 29 and a loss to Kansas City August 3 when he only went eight innings due to it being a road loss. In 32 starts, Tanana had a 14–11 record, a 4.21 ERA, and 127 strikeouts in 203 innings.

On June 9, 1989, Tanana struck out 10 in his first complete game of the year, but the two runs he allowed were the only runs of the game in a loss to Toronto. After Tanana beat the White Sox on August 6, 1989, Anderson praised his pitcher: "Tanana should have at least 15 wins this year. He is pitching the best for me this year since he came over here. He's a real pitcher. He knows what he's doing even when he makes a mistake." He struck out 10 in a two-hit shutout of the Orioles on August 16. Tanana's 3.58 ERA would be his lowest ever for the Tigers, save for the 20 starts he made for them in 1985. He had a 10–14 record, striking out 147 batters in 223 2/3 innings. He became a free agent after the season but re-signed with the club a week later.

Entering his 18th major league season in 1990, Tanana had won 198 games. He gave up five runs in seven innings on April 28, against the Milwaukee Brewers, but still picked up the win, the 200th of his career. The season saw him struggle, though—he had a 6.47 ERA through July 28, prompting the Tigers to bring back Walt Terrell, who had just been released by the Pittsburgh Pirates, to replace him in the rotation. It was during this time that Tanana got the only save of his career, inducing Oscar Azócar to hit a foul pop-up and stranding a runner on second in the 14th inning of a 6–5 triumph over the Yankees August 2. He rejoined the rotation August 25 and posted a 2.44 ERA for the remainder of the year. In 34 games (29 starts), he had a 9–8 record, a 5.31 ERA, and 114 strikeouts in 176 1/3 innings pitched.

Following Jack Morris's departure via free agency in 1991, Tanana became the first pitcher besides him to make an Opening Day start for the Tigers since 1979, also the last year Tanana had made an Opening Day start. He gave up four runs in five innings against the Yankees, leaving with the game tied, as the Tigers beat New York 6–4. He threw a shutout against the White Sox April 18, then threw another shutout against the Angels June 7. Also, June 18, he came within one out of throwing another shutout but left after giving up two straight singles in the ninth; Mike Henneman finished a 2–0 victory over Oakland. On September 27, he became the last player to throw a pitch in the history of Memorial Stadium, allowing one run in a complete game, 7–1 victory over the Orioles. He made 33 starts for the Tigers in 1991, posting a 13–12 record, a 3.77 ERA, and 107 strikeouts in 217 1/3 innings pitched.

Tanana posted a 7.07 ERA in his first six starts of the 1992 season, then had a start skipped after May 7. Used in relief May 12, he picked up the win against California, pitching two scoreless innings. He rejoined the rotation after that and posted a 3.96 ERA the rest of the way. There were no shutouts for Tanana in 1992, but he did throw eight scoreless innings for the win in a 6–0 victory over Texas on August 16. In 31 starts, he had a 13–11 record, a 4.39 ERA, and 91 strikeouts in 186 2/3 innings pitched. After the 1992 season, he became a free agent.

=== New York Mets and New York Yankees ===
Tanana signed as a free agent with the New York Mets for the 1993 season. The Mets were interested in him partly as a mentor for left-handed prospect Pete Schourek. Tanana's manager with the team, Jeff Torborg, was his catcher in his MLB debut in 1973. Tanana won seven games for the last-place team but lost 15 (tied for 6th in the National League (NL)) before being traded to the New York Yankees for Kenny Greer on September 17, as the Yankees sought pitching help in an attempt to capture the AL East pennant. Tanana lost two of his three starts for the Yankees, and they did not reach the post-season. In his last start of the season (and ultimately, his final major league appearance) on October 1, he held the Tigers to four runs (three earned) over 6 1/3 innings and left with the Yankees leading 5–4. Bobby Muñoz blew the lead, costing Tanana the chance for the win, as the Yankees prevailed 9–6. Tanana's combined totals for the season were a 7–17 record, a 4.35 ERA, and 116 strikeouts in 202 2/3 innings pitched. Following the year, he again became a free agent.

On February 15, 1994, Tanana signed a minor league contract with the Angels, hoping to pitch another year. He competed for a starting spot in their rotation but was released in favor of Mark Leiter after going 0–3 with a 13.50 ERA in spring training, marking the end of his professional career. In 21 seasons in the major leagues, Tanana had a 3.66 lifetime ERA.

== Pitching style ==
In his prime, Tanana was known for a hard fastball in the mid-to-upper nineties, to go along with a devastating curveball. Arm injuries in 1977 and 1979 made him realize that he would not be able to stick around the big leagues very long if he kept throwing so hard. As a result, he altered his style, throwing less hard and developing a mixture of off-speed pitches, such as the forkball and the screwball. He mixed his repertoire of off-speed pitches very effectively, using deception rather than speed to get hitters out. "I have to change speeds and try to get ahead of the hitters in any ballpark," he summarized his style. He and others quipped that he was "the guy who threw 90 in the 70s and 70 in the 90s." The new style extended his career, and he accumulated 34 shutouts, 4,188 1/3 innings pitched, and 2,773 strikeouts. He is one of only 26 major league pitchers to have struck out at least 2,700 batters in his career.

In a 21-year career, Tanana never had any sort of surgery on his arm. "I had sore arms, of course, that just goes right along with pitching. You're going to have sore arms on occasion." When his arm did get sore, Tanana treated it with physical therapy and strengthening exercises. In a 2019 interview, he speculated that young pitchers were having arm surgery more often because they threw too much when they were young, and they focused too much on baseball when they were young, instead of playing other sports as well during the year.

== Legacy ==
As a result of his 21-year career, Tanana is among the career leaders in baseball history in a number of categories. His 240 wins are 58th all-time, and the second-most by a pitcher who never won 20 games in a season (Dennis Martínez won 245). His 236 losses rank 17th all-time, and he holds the AL record for most home runs allowed (422). Tanana's 4,188 1/3 innings pitched are the 35th most in baseball history, his 1,704 earned runs allowed are 21st, and his 17,641 batters faced rank 37th.

In 1999, Tanana appeared on the Hall of Fame ballot for the first time but received no votes and thus was removed from future Baseball Writers' Association of America (BBWAA) consideration for election (although he could still be elected by the Veterans Committee). He has the most career WAR (57.1 according to Baseball Reference) of any player to appear on the BBWAA ballot and not receive any votes. As of 2024, Tanana's 2,773 strikeouts rank him at number 26 all-time. Also not in the Hall of Fame are Roger Clemens (#3 with 4,672 strikeouts), (Note: Clemens's nonelection is due to performance-enhancing drugs allegations.) Curt Schilling (#17 with 3,116), Lolich (#23 with 2,832), and David Cone (#27 with 2,668).

Tanana is in the top 10 among Angels in several categories. His 102 wins with the team are tied for fifth with John Lackey, his 3.08 ERA ranks fifth, and his 1,233 strikeouts rank fifth in franchise history. His 269 strikeouts in 1975 are still the most by a left-handed pitcher for the Angels. Tanana is one of only two pitchers in MLB history (along with Rick Reuschel) to give up a home run to both Hank Aaron and Barry Bonds, the top two players on MLB's all-time home run leaderboard.

== Personal life ==
When Tanana first reached the major leagues, he quickly earned a reputation as a partier and drinker. He told reporters his idol was himself, that he was already one of the greatest pitchers of all-time, and that "Nothing I do awes me." After his injury in 1979, though, Tanana realized his career could be over any day. He also found himself struggling for answers following the 1978 murder of his Angel teammate Lyman Bostock. On November 6, 1983, while at an Arizona hotel room, Tanana became a born again Christian. "I understood that I was dead in my sins," Tanana said. "I realized I had no chance of having a relationship with my Holy God. But His Son, Jesus, had lived a perfect life and paid the penalty for my sin. If I trusted my life in Him and asked Him for forgiveness and asked Him to come into my life, that I would be a brand new creature. I would be a brand new person. My sins would all be forgiven. On November 6, 1983, I made that commitment of trusting in Jesus. I have walked with Him ever since."

Since then, Tanana has been a leader in the Christian community within professional baseball. He credits God for the success of his marriage and the longevity of his career. While he was still playing, he joined the Fellowship of Christian Athletes. Since retiring, he has ministered to professional athletes in a number of ways. He and his wife, Cathy, serve on the Pro Athletes Outreach Board of Directors. As of 2002, Tanana was assisting Detroit Tiger chaplain Jeff Totten, and he would also participate in Home Plate events, where Tiger players would speak about their faith in Christ at Tiger Stadium before games. Tanana has spoken about his faith at different churches. He has participated in Bible studies and performed marriage counseling since retiring. Says Tanana, "I've been fortunate and blessed the way my life has turned out."

Tanana met his wife, Cathy Mull, at a Newport Beach disco in 1977, while she was a dance major at Long Beach State University. Five hundred guests showed up at their wedding in 1978. They have four daughters—Lauren, Jill and Kari (twins), and Erin—and several grandchildren. The couple now reside in Farmington Hills, Michigan, and he is an Elder at Highland Park Baptist Church in Southfield. Frank has coached young athletes at Southfield Christian School. In 1996, Tanana was inducted into the National Polish-American Sports Hall of Fame, and in 2006, Tanana was inducted into the Michigan Sports Hall of Fame.

== See also ==
- List of Major League Baseball career wins leaders
- List of Major League Baseball annual ERA leaders
- List of Major League Baseball annual strikeout leaders
- List of Major League Baseball career hit batsmen leaders
- Home runs allowed
- List of Major League Baseball career strikeout leaders
- List of Los Angeles Angels Opening Day starting pitchers
- List of Detroit Tigers Opening Day starting pitchers
