= Jered Weaver =

American baseball player (born 1982)

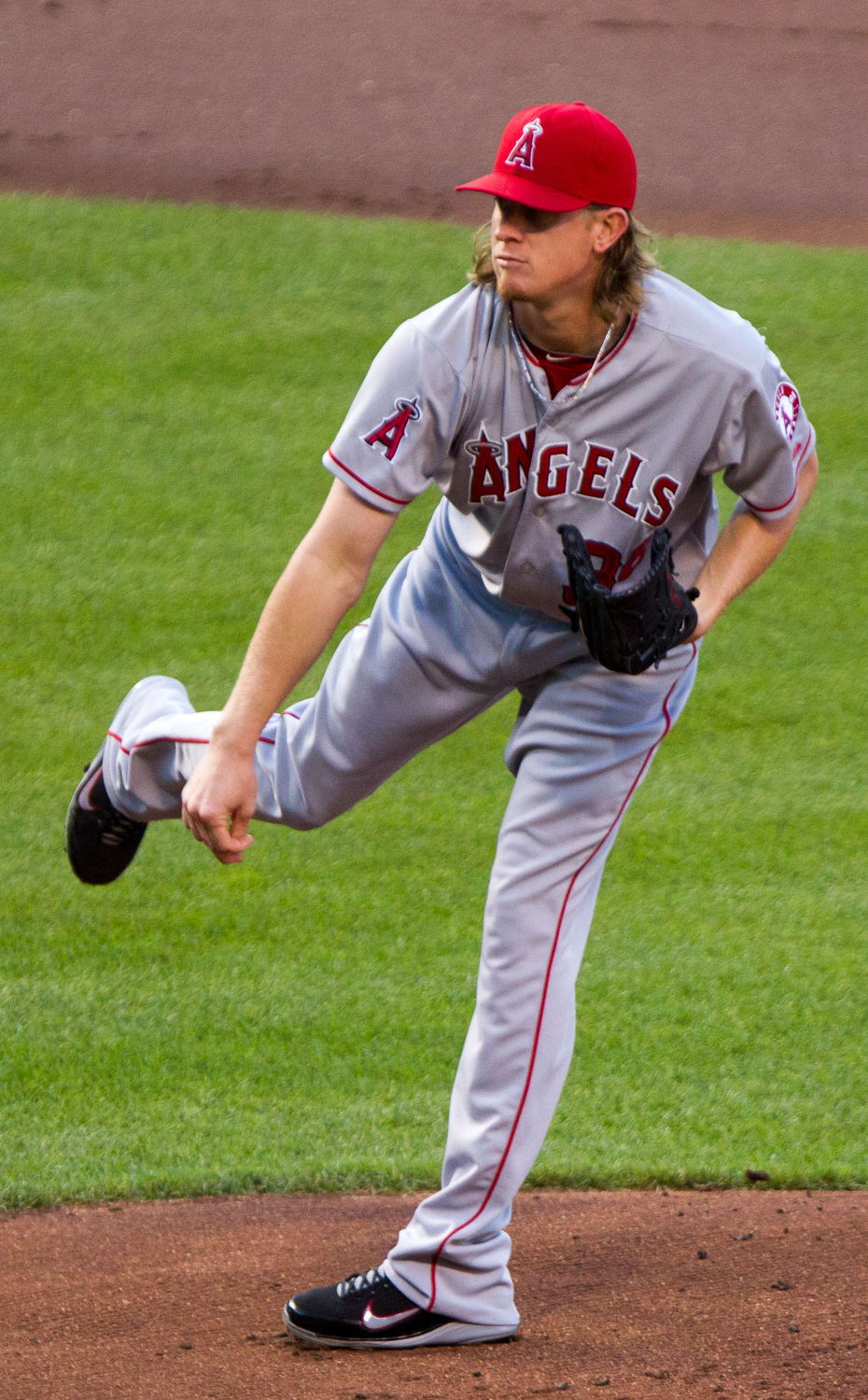
- Weaver with the Angels in 2012
- Pitcher
- Born: October 4, 1982 (age 43); Northridge, California, U.S.
- Batted: Right Threw: Right

MLB debut
- May 27, 2006, for the Los Angeles Angels of Anaheim

Last MLB appearance
- May 19, 2017, for the San Diego Padres

MLB statistics
- Win–loss record: 150–98
- Earned run average: 3.63
- Strikeouts: 1,621
- Stats at Baseball Reference

Teams
- Los Angeles Angels of Anaheim / Los Angeles Angels (2006–2016); San Diego Padres (2017)

Career highlights and awards
- 3× All-Star (2010–2012); 2× AL wins leader (2012, 2014); MLB strikeout leader (2010); Golden Spikes Award (2004); Dick Howser Trophy (2004); Pitched a no-hitter on May 2, 2012
Medals
Men's baseball
Representing United States
Pan American Games
Silver medal – second place	2003 Santo Domingo	National team

Jered David Weaver (born October 4, 1982) is an American former professional baseball starting pitcher. He played in Major League Baseball (MLB) for the Los Angeles Angels and San Diego Padres. Weaver was drafted in the first round (12th overall) in the 2004 Major League Baseball draft by the Angels out of Long Beach State. He was a three-time All Star, and twice led the American League in wins. He is the younger brother of former pitcher Jeff Weaver.

== Early life and college career ==
Weaver grew up in Simi Valley, California, and attended Simi Valley High School.

Weaver attended college at California State University, Long Beach. Weaver went 37–9 during his baseball career at Long Beach State. In his final season of 2004, he became the top pro pitching prospect in the country, going 15–1, with a 1.62 earned run average (ERA), 213 strikeouts and just 21 walks in 144 innings. After the 2004 season, he won the Golden Spikes Award as the top amateur baseball player in America, the Dick Howser Trophy as the national collegiate baseball player of the year, the Roger Clemens Award as college baseball's top pitcher, and was named starting pitcher on the All-American first team by Baseball America. A 2004 Los Angeles Times article called him dominant, describing his pitching as overwhelming "batters with a fastball between 89 and 94 mph, a sharp slider and an improving curveball all thrown with the same three-quarter arm delivery. He also has a fiery streak that is revealed with a fist pump or yell after a strikeout that ends an inning or a long at-bat." The article compared him to 2001 college pitching sensation Mark Prior.

In recognition of his college career, Weaver in his Long Beach uniform was the cover athlete of MVP 07: NCAA Baseball. Since it was released after he entered the major leagues, he and his likeness were not included in the game.

== Professional career ==
=== Los Angeles Angels of Anaheim / Los Angeles Angels ===
==== 2004 draft and minor leagues ====
Weaver was originally speculated to be one of the top three overall draft picks in 2004; however, the bonus demands of his agent, Scott Boras, turned off several teams. On draft day, Jim Callis at Baseball America asked "Where In The World Is Jered Weaver Going? That is the $10.5 million question. No team is claiming him as a possible first-round pick, and there's no sense that a club is lying in the weeds on him. He and adviser Scott Boras don't seem to be backing down from a reported desire for Mark Prior money, and he could slide through the entire first round altogether." Weaver was drafted in the first round (12th pick overall) by the Angels in the 2004 Major League Baseball draft. Angels scouting director Eddie Bane said he did not know until two minutes before the draft that he'd definitely get the opportunity to select Weaver. Bane told Baseball America about their scouting, "We did our homework. We started when Jered first got to Long Beach. I watched him in intrasquad games back in January. All our guys had seen him. We didn't back off because of reports in the paper. We do our stuff privately. We were prepared if he was there at 12 to take him." However, negotiations did not proceed smoothly. Talks broke down multiple times. Boras and client Weaver held out until the last minutes before the May 2005 deadline, becoming the longest holdout in draft history. Weaver received a $4 million signing bonus, less than the $10.5 million originally sought and also less than a $7–8 million range mentioned in the media just months before signing.

Weaver's ascent to the major leagues was quick. He made his MLB debut on May 27, 2006, just 361 days after signing with the club. He spent just over one month in Single-A before being promoted to Double-A where he would finish 2005 3–3 with a 3.98 ERA. In 2006, Weaver moved up to Triple-A Salt Lake where he dominated hitters. MiLB wrote of Weaver's success, "It's fairly common for prospects to struggle in their first exposure to Triple-A ball, but the 23-year-old Weaver dominated the Pacific Coast League almost immediately, posting a 6–1 record with a 2.10 ERA in 12 games for the Bees." Angels management were impressed enough to call Weaver up when ace Bartolo Colón was on the disabled list.

==== 2006–2007 ====
He made his MLB debut on May 27, 2006, starting against the Baltimore Orioles. He pitched seven shutout innings, striking out five, and earned the victory. This was followed with three more consecutive victories. Despite his success, when Bartolo Colón returned from the disabled list, Weaver was bumped out of the rotation and sent back down to the minors. He was recalled to the majors on June 30, when the Angels designated Weaver's brother Jeff for assignment.

Weaver continued his impressive performance, lowering his ERA to 1.12 after six starts. He won his first nine decisions at the start of his major league career, tying the American League record set by Whitey Ford in 1950. Weaver recorded his first loss on August 24, when he lost to the Boston Red Sox, despite allowing only one earned run in seven innings pitched, a home run to David Ortiz. He finished the season with an 11–2 record and a 2.56 ERA and placed fifth in the American League (AL) Rookie of the Year Award voting.

==== 2008 ====
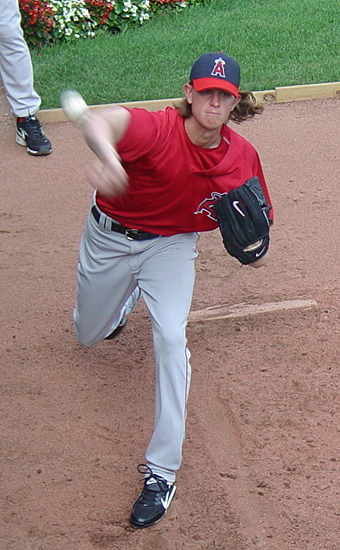
Weaver warming up in the bullpen in 2008.

On June 28, 2008, he and José Arredondo combined to no-hit the Los Angeles Dodgers over eight innings, but still lost the game 1–0. This was only the fourth time in major league history that a no-hit bid was unable to go nine innings because of the home team winning the game, and the first as a combined effort. Because they did not pitch nine innings, it is not officially considered a no-hitter.

Weaver made his first career relief appearance against the Red Sox at Fenway Park in Game 3 of the 2008 AL Division Series. He recorded the win in the bottom of the 12th inning in order to keep the Angels, who previously were down 2–0 in the series, hopes of winning the series alive.

==== 2009 ====
On June 14, 2009, Weaver had his first complete game shutout against the San Diego Padres.

On June 20, 2009, Weaver started for the Angels against the Los Angeles Dodgers. The opposing starter was his older brother Jeff Weaver. This was the first pitching matchup between brothers since 2002 when Andy and Alan Benes matched up and only the 15th such game since 1967. The Dodgers won 6–4, with Jeff getting the win and Jered taking the loss.

Weaver was awarded the inaugural Nick Adenhart Pitcher of the Year award, named after Jered's former teammate, for best pitcher on the Angels roster.

==== 2010 ====
Weaver reached a deal with Angels management for a $4.265 million salary for the 2010 season to avoid going into arbitration. During Spring Training, he added a two-seam fastball to his repertoire after instruction from teammates Scot Shields and Joel Piñeiro. After the departure of John Lackey to the Boston Red Sox through free agency, there was some uncertainty over who would assume the role of the club's ace. Many expected that position to be filled by Weaver, who said, "Sure, I'd love to have that role. But I really don't like to think about it. I just try to improve every year, and this year is no exception." Weaver was the Angels' Opening Day starter, beating the Minnesota Twins at Angel Stadium on an ESPN national broadcast.

On July 6, after not having been initially selected, Weaver replaced CC Sabathia on the AL roster for the 2010 All-Star Game due to the latter's ineligibility to pitch. Weaver joined Torii Hunter as the only Angels representing the host club for Angel Stadium's third Mid-Summer Classic, though he did not pitch in the game. The All-Star selection was well-deserved, as Weaver posted the best season of his short big league tenure thus far. Weaver was the major league strikeout champion with 233, besting Mariners ace Félix Hernández by one strikeout. He also posted career-bests in innings pitched (with 224.1), ERA (3.01), and WHIP (1.07). Weaver's success was not reflected in his win–loss record, however, as he went 13–12 due in part to poor run support. Despite the uncertainty over the role earlier in the season, Weaver embraced and ably fulfilled his new responsibility as the team's ace in 2010. He finished fifth in AL Cy Young award voting.

==== 2011 ====
Weaver picked up right where he left off the 2010 season, serving as a co-ace along with Dan Haren. Weaver posted a 6–0 record and a 0.99 ERA in his first six starts, setting a major league record for first pitcher to reach 6 wins by April 25, 2011. Weaver struck out a career-high 15 batters on April 10, in a game against the Toronto Blue Jays. Weaver became the second pitcher in major league history to win his sixth game in just his team's 23rd game, which tied him with Randy Johnson in 2002.

Through the All-Star break on July 10, Weaver had an 11–4 record and 1.86 ERA in 140.1 innings, complemented by 120 strikeouts, just 31 walks, and a WHIP of 0.91. In July, Weaver's fellow players elected him to his second All-Star Game. On July 11, manager Ron Washington announced that Weaver would start the All-Star Game for the AL. In his one scoreless inning of work at the All-Star Game, Weaver had one strikeout (Carlos Beltrán), one walk (Matt Kemp) and no hits.

On July 31, in a game against the Detroit Tigers, Weaver gave up a solo home-run to Carlos Guillén who watched the home-run and then stared at Weaver as he flipped his bat, upsetting Weaver. Weaver exchanged words with Guillen as he made his trot around the bags, and the home plate umpire issued warnings to both dugouts. The first pitch to the next batter, Alex Avila, was thrown just over Avila's head. Avila ducked, and Weaver was immediately ejected from the game by home-plate umpire Hunter Wendelstedt, along with Angels manager Mike Scioscia. Weaver was suspended for six games because of the incident.

In August, Jered Weaver signed a five-year, $85 million contract extension with the Angels. He finished the 2011 season with an 18–8 record and a 2.41 earned run average, which was edged out by Justin Verlander's 2.40 for the American League lead and was the lowest ERA by an Angel since Chuck Finley's 2.40 in 1990. He finished second in the AL Cy Young Voting.

==== 2012 ====
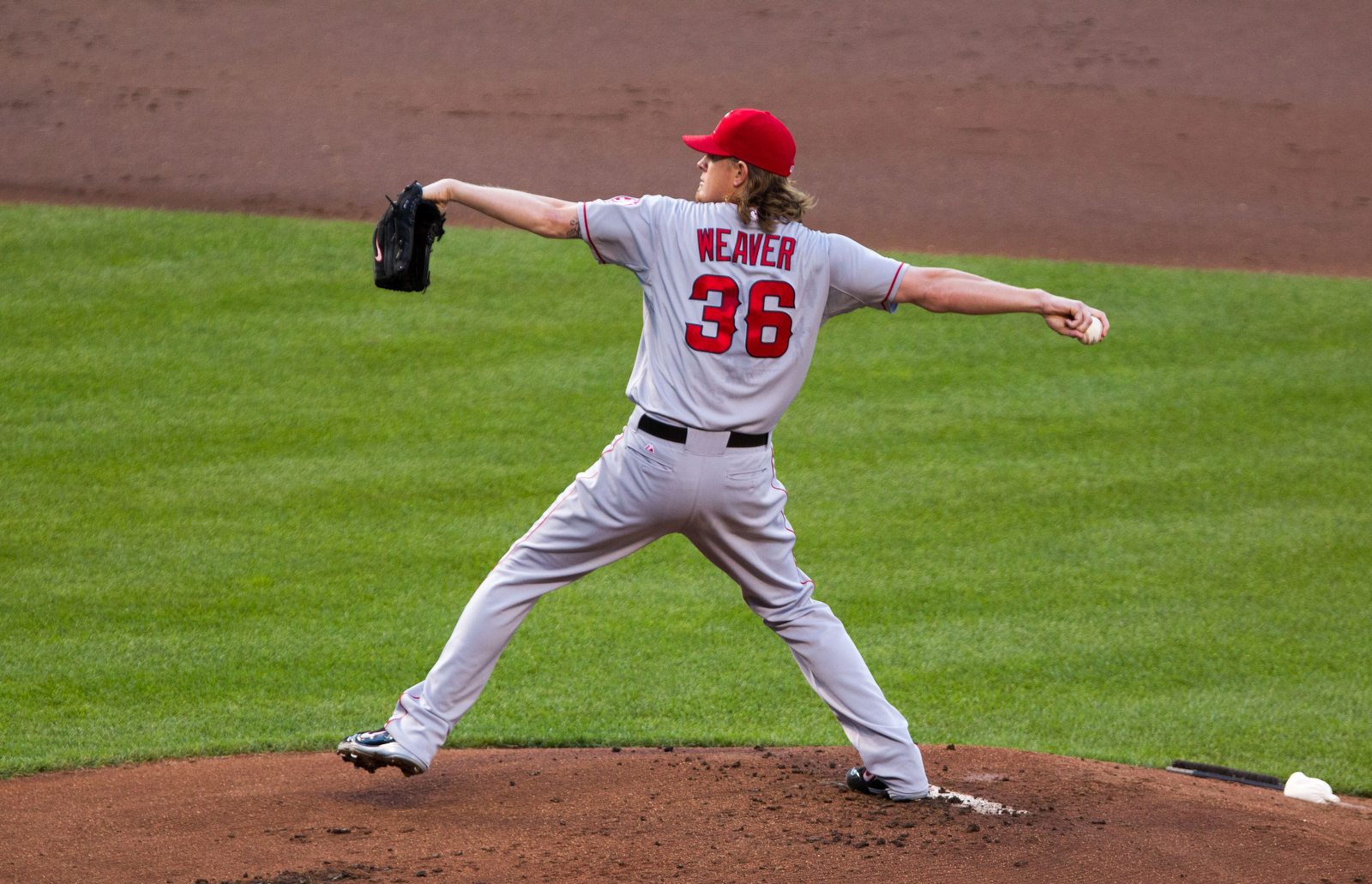
Weaver during a road game in 2012

Starting off the 2012 season, Weaver pitched a four-hit shutout against Kansas City Royals on April 6. Shortly thereafter, he recorded his first official career no-hitter on May 2 against the Minnesota Twins. Weaver allowed only two baserunners – Chris Parmelee reached on a passed ball after a strikeout in the second inning, and Josh Willingham walked in the seventh, he struck out nine and walked only the one batter. On May 28, Weaver sustained a lower back injury after following through on a pitch and was subsequently placed on the 15-day disabled list. Nearing the end of the season and with the Angels still in contention for a postseason spot, Weaver for the first time in his career won his 20th game, on September 28 against the Texas Rangers.

==== 2013–2014 ====
On April 7, 2013, Weaver suffered a fractured left elbow following a base hit by Mitch Moreland of the Texas Rangers. Weaver dodged the line drive by Moreland and ended up injuring the elbow as he rolled on the mound. He was placed on the 15-day disabled list the next day after he left the game. He returned on May 29, against the Los Angeles Dodgers pitching 6 innings with 7 strikeouts.

Weaver finished the 2014 season with a record of 18–9 while having a 3.59 ERA in 213.1 innings pitched.

==== 2015 ====
The 2015 season was a tough one for Weaver as he suffered his first losing season in his career (7–12 in 26 starts) while also registering a then career-high ERA (4.64). Throughout the season, Weaver suffered continued decrease in velocity, clocking in under 86 mph. He led the major leagues in bunt hits allowed, with seven.

==== 2016 ====
In his final season before free agency, Weaver continued to struggle with velocity and command, ending with the highest ERA of his career (5.06). He narrowly avoided another losing season, however, going 12-12. He had the lowest ground ball percentage among major league pitchers (28.8%).

=== San Diego Padres (2017) ===
On February 19, 2017, Weaver signed a one-year, $3 million contract with the San Diego Padres.

Weaver made his debut with the Padres on April 6, giving up four runs in five innings and taking a loss against the Los Angeles Dodgers. He later went on the disabled list with a hip injury. On August 16, Weaver announced his retirement. Weaver made nine starts in his final season, and went 0–5 with a 7.44 ERA and 23 strikeouts in 42 1/3 innings.

== Pitching style ==
Weaver began his windup standing on the extreme third base side of the pitcher's plate, and strode slightly toward the third base side. This, combined with his 6'7" height and long arms, created a pitch traveling at a sharp angle to home plate, making pitch detection more difficult, especially for right-handed batters.

Weaver's arsenal consisted of six pitches:

- Four-seam fastball (84-88 mph)
- Two-seam fastball (83-87 mph)
- Slider (78-81 mph)
- Curveball (67-72 mph)
- Changeup (75-80 mph)
- Cutter (83-87 mph)

His two-seamer was his most-commonly thrown pitch, especially to left-handed hitters. He used the two-seamer, his curveball, and his changeup to get ahead against left-handers. Weaver typically only threw his slider and four-seamer to lefties when there was a 2-strike count. He also used the changeup with two strikes, but not the curveball. Against right-handers, Weaver used the four-seamer and slider most of the time, and rarely used his curveball. His slider was effective in two-strike counts because of its high tendency to get swings and misses (42% of swings through the first two months of the 2012 season).

== Personal life ==
On February 9, 2007, Weaver and his brother had their jerseys retired by Simi Valley High School in a basketball game between Royal High School and Simi Valley.

Weaver and his girlfriend of nine years were married in November 2011. Both are active supporters of Special Olympics Southern California and Weaver serves as a Sports Ambassador for the organization. On July 5, 2013, she gave birth to their first child, a son named Aden in honor of Jered's late friend and teammate Nick Adenhart. Weaver's wife also gave birth to a daughter in 2014.

While playing for the Angels, Weaver would write the letters "NA" on the back of the pitcher's mound in memoriam of Adenhart after his death in 2009.

Preceded by David Price	American League All-Star Game Starting Pitcher; 2011	Succeeded by Justin Verlander
Preceded by Philip Humber	No-hitter pitcher May 2, 2012	Succeeded by Johan Santana
