= List of Los Angeles Angels Opening Day starting pitchers =

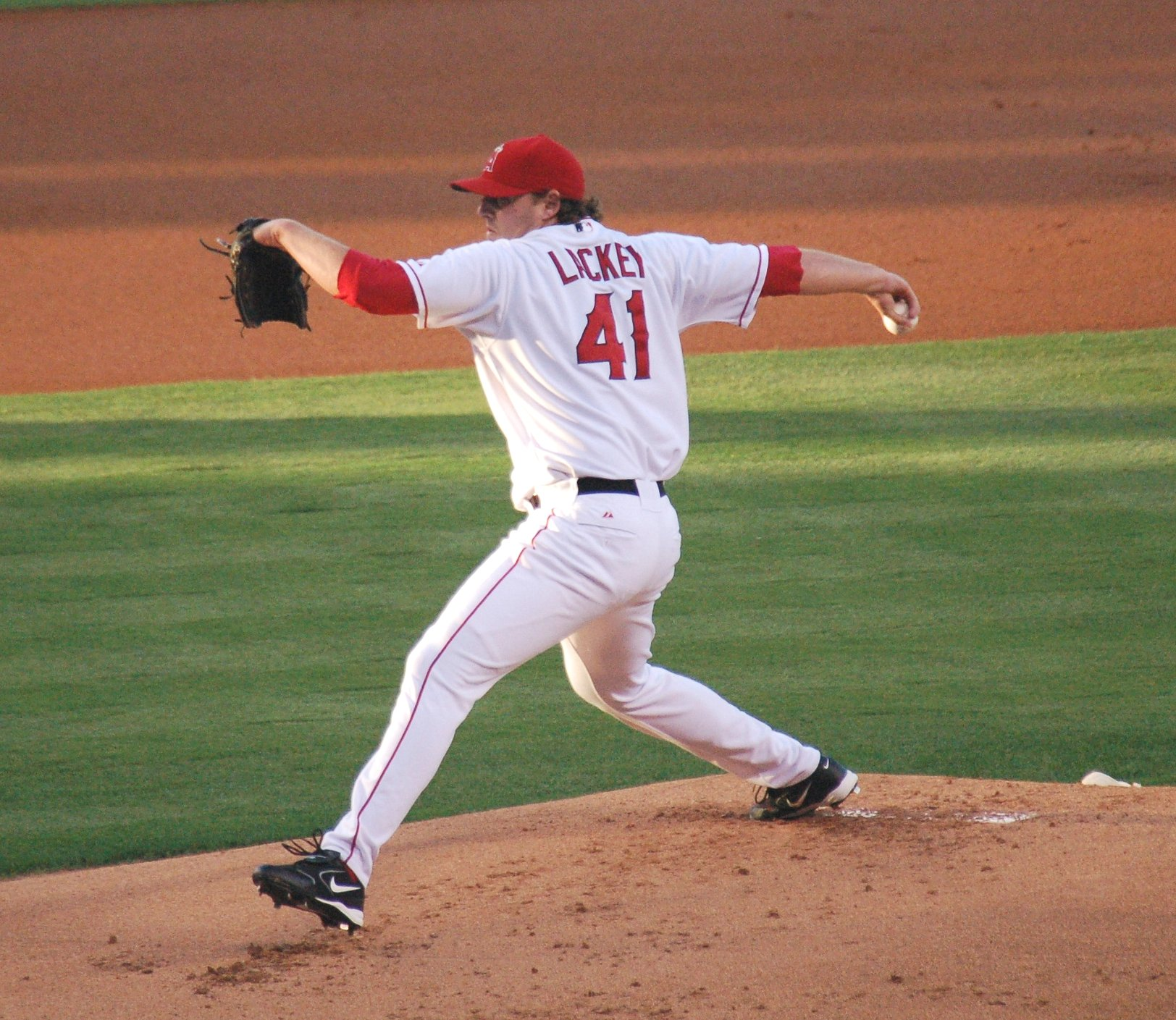
John Lackey was the Angels' Opening Day starting pitcher in 2003 and 2007.

The Los Angeles Angels are a Major League Baseball (MLB) franchise based in Anaheim, California. They play in the American League West division. The franchise has also gone by the names "Los Angeles Angels", "California Angels" and "Anaheim Angels" at various points in its history. The first game of the new baseball season for a team is played on Opening Day, and being named the Opening Day starter is an honor, which is often given to the player who is expected to lead the pitching staff that season, though there are various strategic reasons why a team's best pitcher might not start on Opening Day. The Angels have used 25 different Opening Day starting pitchers in their 51 seasons. The 25 starters have a combined Opening Day record of 26 wins, 18 losses and 7 no decisions. No decisions are awarded to the starting pitcher if the game is won or lost after the starting pitcher has left the game. It can also result if a starting pitcher does not pitch five full innings, even if his team retains the lead and wins.

Jered Weaver has the most Opening Day starts for the Angels, with seven, and had 6 consecutive opening day starts from 2010 to 2015. He has a record of three wins and two losses, with one no decision in those starts that resulted in a win. Mike Witt has the second most starts, with five, with one win, three losses, and one no decision that resulted in a loss. Frank Tanana, Mark Langston and Chuck Finley have all made four Opening Day starts for the Angels. Hall of Famer Nolan Ryan, Bartolo Colón and Jered Weaver have each made three such starts for the Angels.

Nolan Ryan has the Angels record for most wins in Opening Day starts with three. He also has the best win–loss record in Opening Day starts for the Angels, which is 3–0. The other Angels pitchers with multiple wins in Opening Day starts without a loss are Ken McBride and Andy Messersmith. Mike Witt has the record for most losses in Opening Day starts for the Angels with three. Frank Tanana and Chuck Finley each had two such losses.

The Angels have played in three home ball parks. They played their first season in Wrigley Field, which was designed to look like Wrigley Field in Chicago, but never played an Opening Day home game there. In 1962, they moved to Dodger Stadium, but only stayed there through 1965. They played two Opening Day games at Dodger Stadium, winning once and losing once. The Angels finally moved to Angel Stadium of Anaheim in 1966, which was first called Anaheim Stadium, then subsequently renamed Edison International Field of Anaheim later. They have played 29 Opening Day games there, and their starting pitchers have 15 wins and 12 losses with 2 no decisions. This makes their record at home in Opening Day games 15 wins and 13 losses with 2 no decisions. In Opening Day games on the road, their starting pitchers have a record of 10 wins and 5 losses with 5 no decisions.

The Angels have played in one World Series championship in their history, which they won in 2002. Jarrod Washburn was the Angels Opening Day starting pitcher that season. The Angels lost that Opening Day game to the Cleveland Indians. The winning pitcher for the Indians in that game was Bartolo Colón, who would make three Opening Day starts for the Angels later in his career.

== Key ==
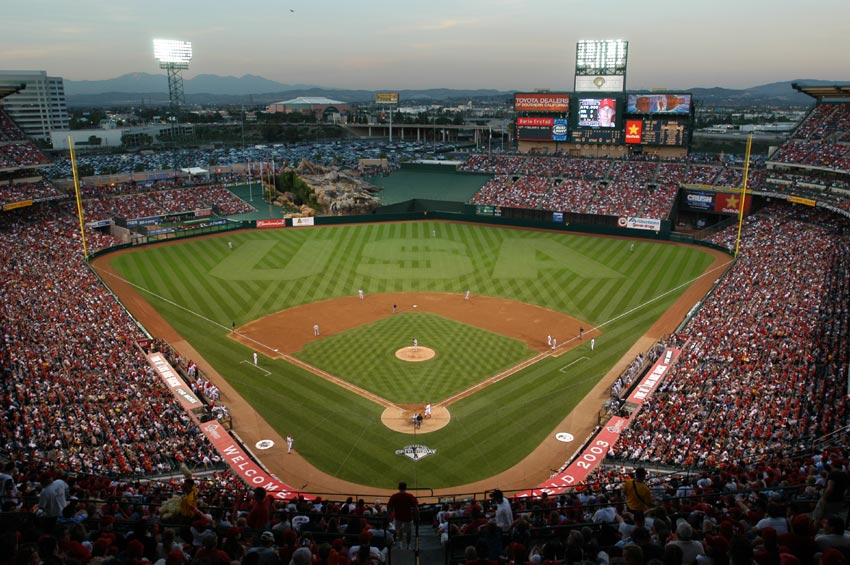
Angel Stadium of Anaheim, the Angels' home ball park under various names since 1966

Season	Each year is linked to an article about that particular Angels season.
W	Win
L	Loss
ND (W)	No decision by starting pitcher; Angels won game
ND (L)	No decision by starting pitcher; Angels lost game
Final score	Game score with Angels runs listed first
Location	Stadium in italics for home game
Pitcher (#)	Number of appearances as Opening Day starter with the Angels
*	Advanced to the post-season
**	Won American League Championship Series
†	Won World Series

== Pitchers ==
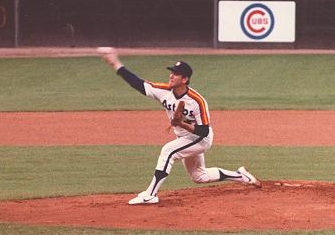
Nolan Ryan, shown with the Houston Astros, won three Opening Day starts for the Angels.

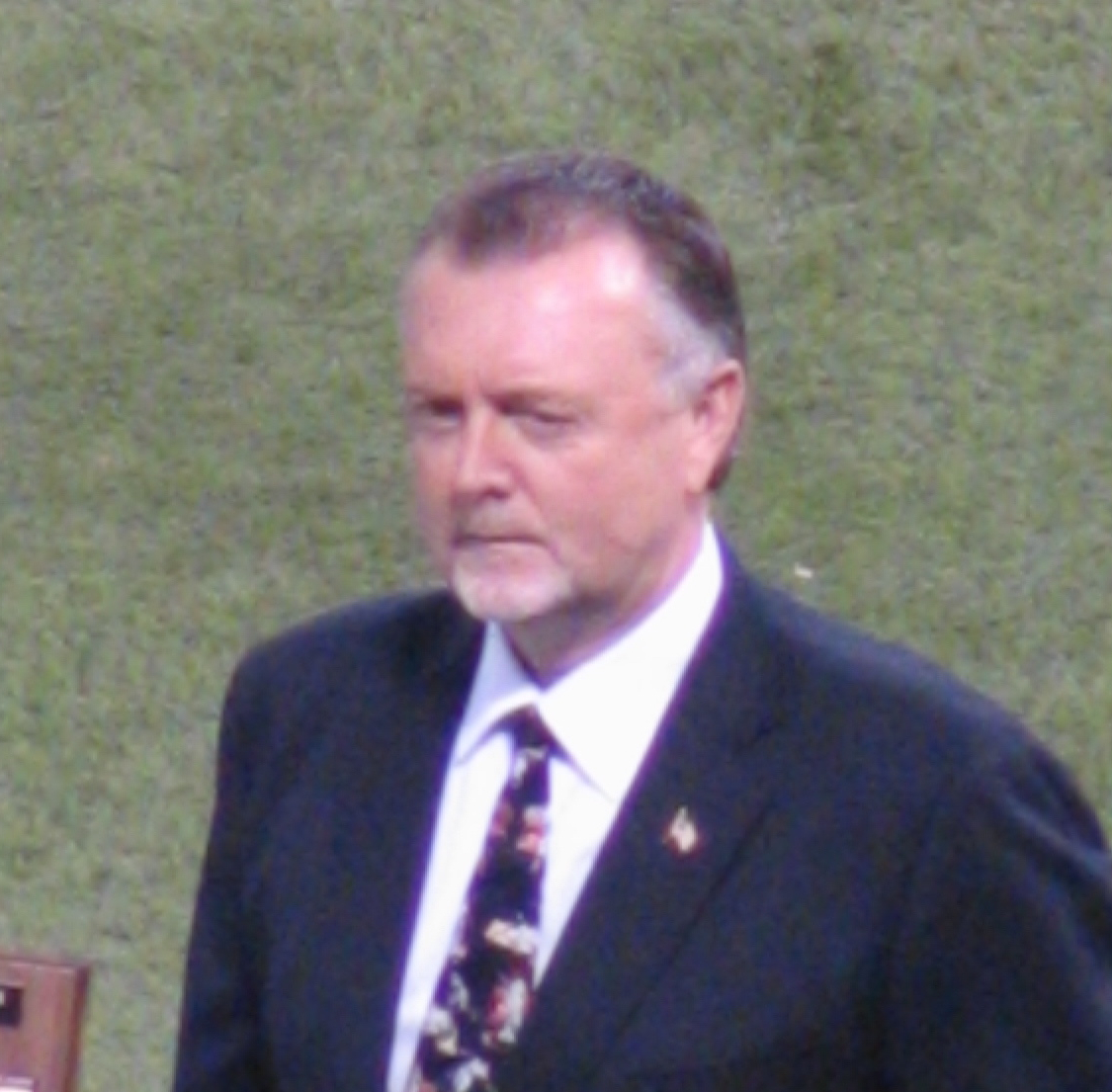
Bert Blyleven was the Angels' Opening Day starting pitcher in 1990.

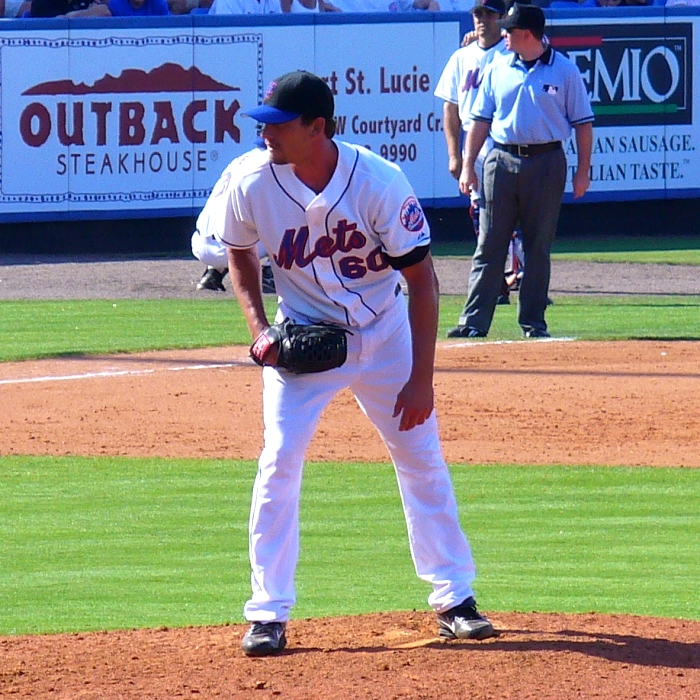
Scott Schoeneweis, shown with the New York Mets, was the Angels' Opening Day starting pitcher in 2001.

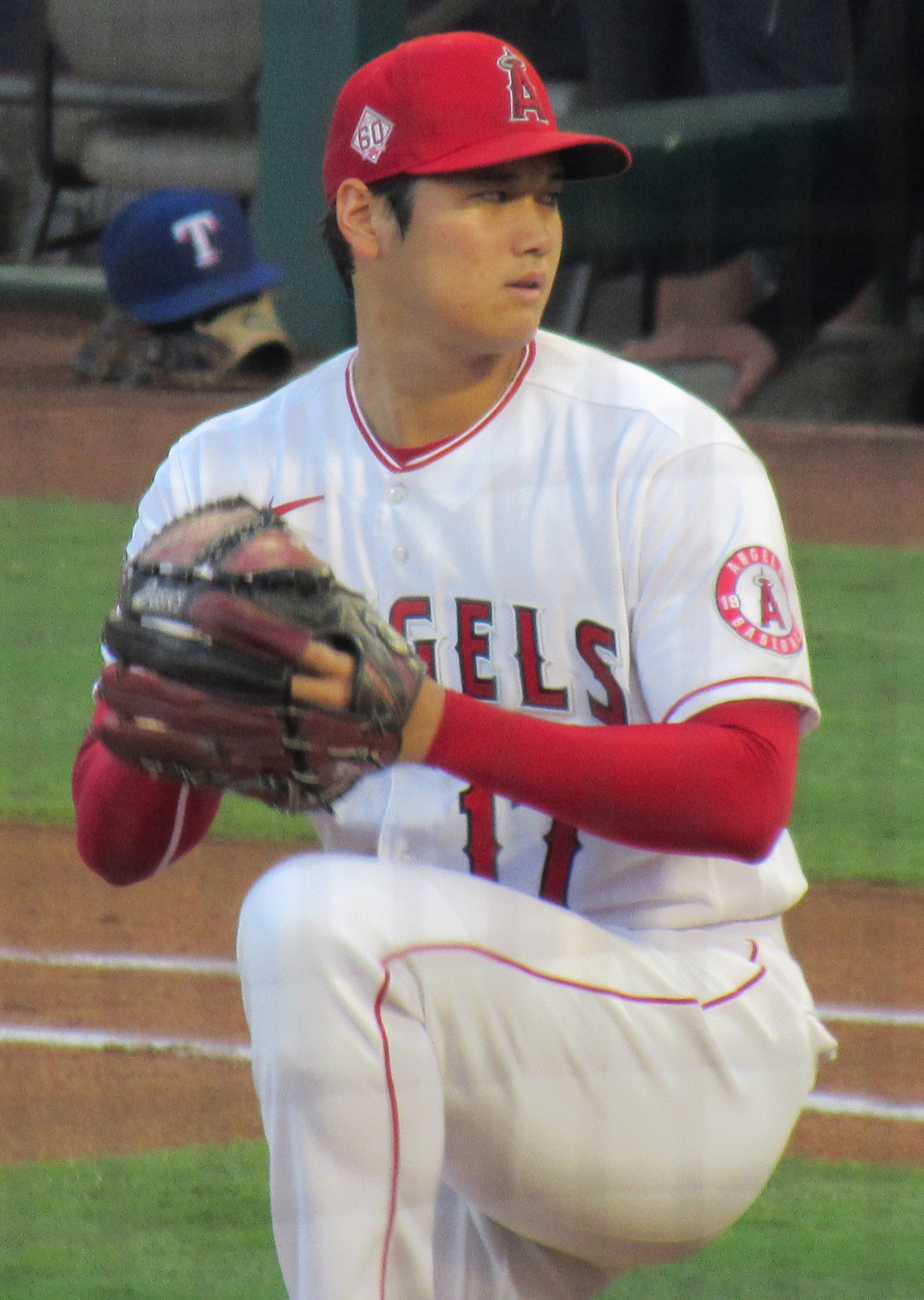
Two-way player Shohei Ohtani was the Angels' Opening Day starter in 2022.

Season	Pitcher	Decision	Final score	Opponent	Location	Ref(s)
1961	Eli Grba	W	7–2	Baltimore Orioles	Memorial Stadium	
1962	Eli Grba (2)	ND (L)	1–2	Chicago White Sox	White Sox Park	
1963	Ken McBride	W	4–1	Boston Red Sox	Dodger Stadium	
1964	Ken McBride (2)	W	4–0	Washington Senators	District of Columbia Stadium	
1965	Fred Newman	L	1–7	Cleveland Indians	Dodger Stadium	
1966	Dean Chance	ND (L)	2–3	Chicago White Sox	White Sox Park	
1967	George Brunet	W	4–2	Detroit Tigers	Anaheim Stadium	
1968	George Brunet (2)	L	0–1	New York Yankees	Yankee Stadium	
1969	Jim McGlothlin	L	3–4	Seattle Pilots	Anaheim Stadium	
1970	Andy Messersmith	W	12–0	Milwaukee Brewers	Milwaukee County Stadium	
1971	Clyde Wright	L	1–4	Kansas City Royals	Anaheim Stadium	
1972	Andy Messersmith (2)	W	1–0	Texas Rangers	Anaheim Stadium	
1973	Nolan Ryan	W	3–2	Kansas City Royals	Anaheim Stadium	
1974	Nolan Ryan (2)	W	8–2	Chicago White Sox	White Sox Park	
1975	Nolan Ryan (3)	W	3–2	Kansas City Royals	Anaheim Stadium	
1976	Frank Tanana	L	2–5	Oakland Athletics	Anaheim Stadium	
1977	Frank Tanana (2)	W	7–0	Seattle Mariners	Kingdome	
1978	Frank Tanana (3)	W	1–0	Oakland Athletics	Anaheim Stadium	
1979*	Frank Tanana (4)	L	4–5	Seattle Mariners	Kingdome	
1980	Dave Frost	W	10–2	Cleveland Indians	Anaheim Stadium	
1981	Geoff Zahn	W	6–2	Seattle Mariners	Kingdome	
1982*	Ken Forsch	ND (L)	2–3	Oakland Athletics	Oakland–Alameda County Coliseum	
1983	Bruce Kison	W	3–2	Milwaukee Brewers	Anaheim Stadium	
1984	Ken Forsch (2)	W	2–1	Boston Red Sox	Anaheim Stadium	
1985	Mike Witt	L	2–6	Minnesota Twins	Anaheim Stadium	
1986*	Mike Witt (2)	ND (L)	4–8	Seattle Mariners	Kingdome	
1987	Mike Witt (3)	W	7–1	Seattle Mariners	Anaheim Stadium	
1988	Mike Witt (4)	L	5–8	Chicago White Sox	Comiskey Park	
1989	Mike Witt (5)	L	2–9	Chicago White Sox	Anaheim Stadium	
1990	Bert Blyleven	L	4–7	Seattle Mariners	Anaheim Stadium	
1991	Chuck Finley	W	3–2	Seattle Mariners	Kingdome	
1992	Mark Langston	L	4–10	Chicago White Sox	Anaheim Stadium	
1993	Mark Langston (2)	W	3–1	Milwaukee Brewers	Anaheim Stadium	
1994	Mark Langston (3)	W	8–2	Minnesota Twins	Hubert H. Humphrey Metrodome	
1995	Chuck Finley (2)	L	4–5	Detroit Tigers	Anaheim Stadium	
1996	Chuck Finley (3)	L	9–15	Milwaukee Brewers	Anaheim Stadium	
1997	Mark Langston (4)	ND (L)	5–6	Boston Red Sox	Anaheim Stadium	
1998	Chuck Finley (4)	W	4–1	New York Yankees	Edison International Field of Anaheim	
1999	Tim Belcher	ND (W)	6–5	Cleveland Indians	Edison International Field of Anaheim	
2000	Ken Hill	L	2–3	New York Yankees	Edison International Field of Anaheim	
2001	Scott Schoeneweis	L	2–3	Texas Rangers	Rangers Ballpark in Arlington	
2002†	Jarrod Washburn	L	0–6	Cleveland Indians	Edison International Field of Anaheim	
2003	John Lackey	L	3–6	Texas Rangers	Edison International Field of Anaheim	
2004*	Bartolo Colón	W	10–5	Seattle Mariners	Safeco Field	
2005*	Bartolo Colón (2)	W	3–2	Texas Rangers	Angel Stadium of Anaheim	
2006	Bartolo Colón (3)	ND (W)	5–4	Seattle Mariners	Safeco Field	
2007*	John Lackey (2)	W	4–1	Texas Rangers	Angel Stadium of Anaheim	
2008*	Jered Weaver	L	2–3	Minnesota Twins	Hubert H. Humphrey Metrodome	
2009*	Joe Saunders	W	3–0	Oakland Athletics	Angel Stadium of Anaheim	
2010	Jered Weaver (2)	W	6–3	Minnesota Twins	Angel Stadium of Anaheim	
2011	Jered Weaver (3)	W	4–2	Kansas City Royals	Kauffman Stadium	
2012	Jered Weaver (4)	W	5–0	Kansas City Royals	Angel Stadium of Anaheim	
2013	Jered Weaver (5)	ND (W)	3–1	Cincinnati Reds	Great American Ball Park	
2014*	Jered Weaver (6)	L	3–10	Seattle Mariners	Angel Stadium of Anaheim	
2015	Jered Weaver (7)	L	1–4	Seattle Mariners	Safeco Field	
2016	Garrett Richards	L	0–9	Chicago Cubs	Angel Stadium of Anaheim	
2017	Ricky Nolasco	L	2–4	Oakland Athletics	Oakland Alameda Coliseum	
2018	Garrett Richards (2)	ND (L)	5–6	Oakland Athletics	Oakland Alameda Coliseum	
2019	Trevor Cahill	L	0–4	Oakland Athletics	Oakland Alameda Coliseum	
2020	Andrew Heaney	ND (L)	3–7	Oakland Athletics	Oakland Alameda Coliseum	
2021	Dylan Bundy	ND (W)	4–3	Chicago White Sox	Angel Stadium of Anaheim	
2022	Shohei Ohtani	L	1–3	Houston Astros	Angel Stadium of Anaheim	
2023	Shohei Ohtani (2)	ND (L)	1–2	Oakland Athletics	RingCentral Coliseum	
2024	Patrick Sandoval	L	3–11	Baltimore Orioles	Oriole Park at Camden Yards	
2025	Yusei Kikuchi	L	1–8	Chicago White Sox	Rate Field	
2026	José Soriano	W	3–0	Houston Astros	Daikin Park	
