= California Surplus Land Act =

The California Surplus Land Act (Gov. Code § 54220 et seq.) is a 1968 state law regulating the sale of surplus publicly-owned land to other entities.

== Amendments ==
- AB 1486, effective Januatry 1, 2020, broadened the SLA's definition of surplus land, reduces exemptions, and orders agencies to follow a process prior to the sale/lease of surplus property to prioritize sales for development of affordable housing.
- SB 747, AB 480, and AB 1734 (signed by Newsom in 2024) amended the SLA further to provide for exemptions.
