= Los Angeles Angels =

Major League Baseball franchise in Anaheim, California

- 2026 Los Angeles Angels season

Logo	Cap insignia
- Established in 1961; Based in Anaheim since 1966

Major league affiliations
- American League (1961–present); West Division (1969–present)

Current uniform
- Retired numbers: 11; 26; 29; 30; 50; 42

Colors
- Red, navy blue, silver

Name
- Los Angeles Angels (2005–present); Anaheim Angels (1997–2004); California Angels (1965–1996); Los Angeles Angels (1961–1965)

Nicknames
- The Halos; The A-Team

Ballpark
- Angel Stadium (1966–present) (Note: Previously known as Anaheim Stadium from 1966 to 1997 and Edison International Field from 1998 to 2003); Chavez Ravine Stadium (1962–1965) (Note: Dodger Stadium referred to as "Chavez Ravine Stadium" by the team); Wrigley Field (1961)

Major league titles
- World Series titles (1): 2002
- AL pennants (1): 2002
- AL West division titles (9): 1979; 1982; 1986; 2004; 2005; 2007; 2008; 2009; 2014
- Wild card berths (1): 2002

Front office
- Principal owner: Arte Moreno
- President: Molly Jolly
- General manager: Vacant
- Manager: Vacant
- Website: mlb.com/angels

The Los Angeles Angels are an American professional baseball team based in Anaheim, California, within the Greater Los Angeles area. The Angels compete in Major League Baseball (MLB) as a member club of the American League (AL) West Division. Since 1966, the team has played its home games at Angel Stadium.

The franchise was founded in Los Angeles in 1961 by Gene Autry as one of MLB's first two expansion teams and the first to originate in California. Deriving its name from an earlier Los Angeles Angels franchise that played in the Pacific Coast League (PCL), the team was based in Los Angeles until moving to Anaheim in 1966. Due to the move, the franchise was known as the California Angels from 1965 to 1996 and the Anaheim Angels from 1997 to 2004. "Los Angeles" was added back to the name in 2005, but because of a lease agreement with Anaheim that required the city to also be in the name, the franchise was known as the Los Angeles Angels of Anaheim until 2015. The current Los Angeles Angels name came into use the following season.

Throughout their first four decades of existence the Angels were a middling franchise, but did win three division titles during that span. Notable stars to have played for the Angels during that time include Hall of Fame players Nolan Ryan (1972-1979), who threw four of his seven no-hitters with California, Rod Carew (1979-1985), who collected his 3,000th hit with the team, and Reggie Jackson (1982-1986), who hit his 500th career home run with the team. The Angels came within one game of reaching the World Series in 1982 and 1986. Under manager Mike Scioscia, they would eventually achieve their first Wild Card spot in 2002 for their first postseason appearance since 1986 and used this momentum to win the 2002 World Series, their only championship appearance to date. The Angels and the Washington Nationals are the only two MLB franchises to win their sole appearance in the World Series. Over the next seven years under Scioscia's management, the Angels would then win five division titles, spearheaded by their lone Hall of Fame representative Vladimir Guerrero. They also saw an increase in fan attendance, consistently placing the franchise among the top draws in MLB. This notoriety has grown into international attention since 2012 with the signing of Albert Pujols and the emergence of superstars Mike Trout and Shohei Ohtani, who cumulatively won five AL Most Valuable Player (MVP) awards with the team. Despite this, they have not appeared in the postseason since 2014, the longest active playoff drought of any MLB team.

Through 2025, the Angels have a win–loss record of 5,093–5,205–3 (.495). They were the first expansion team to reach 5,000 total wins, doing so in 2024. As of 2026, they are one of only three MLB teams, and the only one in the American League, that have been undefeated in the World Series. The Angels also became the last active MLB franchise to lose 100 games in a season, doing so in 2026.

== History ==
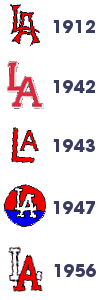
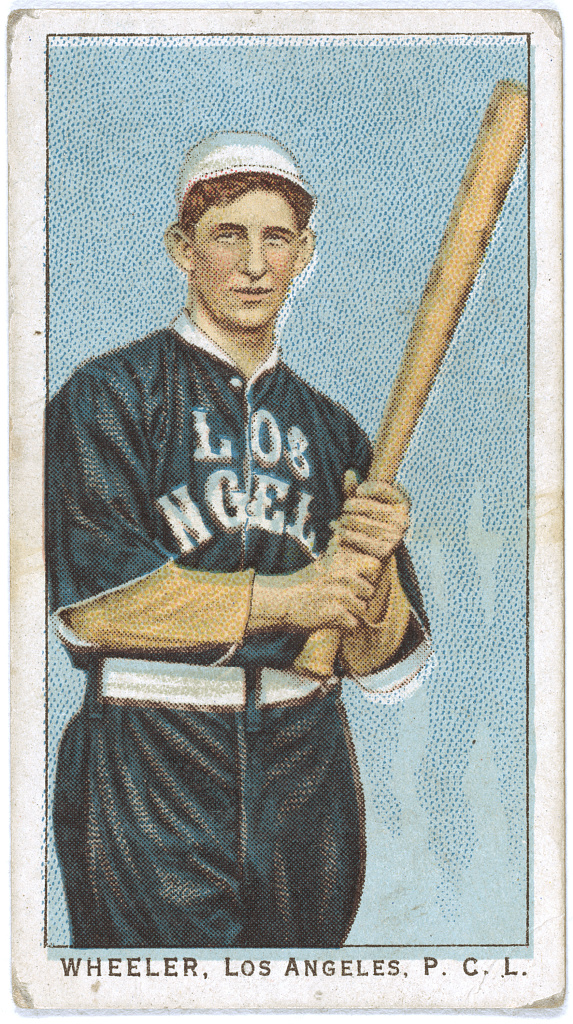
The PCL's Angels (1892–1957) played in L.A. at Wrigley Field until the arrival of the Dodgers in 1958. The Angels nickname originates from the PCL franchise.

The Los Angeles Angels name originates from the first Los Angeles–based sports team, the Los Angeles Angels of the California League, who took the name from the English translation of Los Angeles, which means 'The Angels' in Spanish. The team name started in 1892. In 1903, the team name continued through the Los Angeles Angels of the Pacific Coast League. The current Angels franchise was established by MLB in 1961 after original owner Gene Autry bought the rights to the franchise name from Walter O'Malley, the former Los Angeles Dodgers owner, who had acquired the franchise from Phil Wrigley, the owner of the Chicago Cubs at the time. As stated in the book Under the Halo: The Official History of Angels Baseball, "Autry agreed to buy the franchise name for $350,000, and continue the history of the previously popular Pacific Coast League team as his own expansion team in the MLB." After the Angels joined the MLB, some players from the Angels' PCL team joined the MLB Angels in 1961.

As an expansion franchise, the club continued in Los Angeles and played their home games at Los Angeles' Wrigley Field (not to be confused with Chicago's ballpark of the same name), which had formerly been the home of the PCL Angels. The Angels were one of two expansion teams established as a result of the 1961 Major League Baseball expansion, along with the second incarnation of the Washington Senators (now Texas Rangers). The team then moved in 1962 to newly built Dodger Stadium, which the Angels referred to as Chavez Ravine, where they were tenants of the Dodgers through 1965.

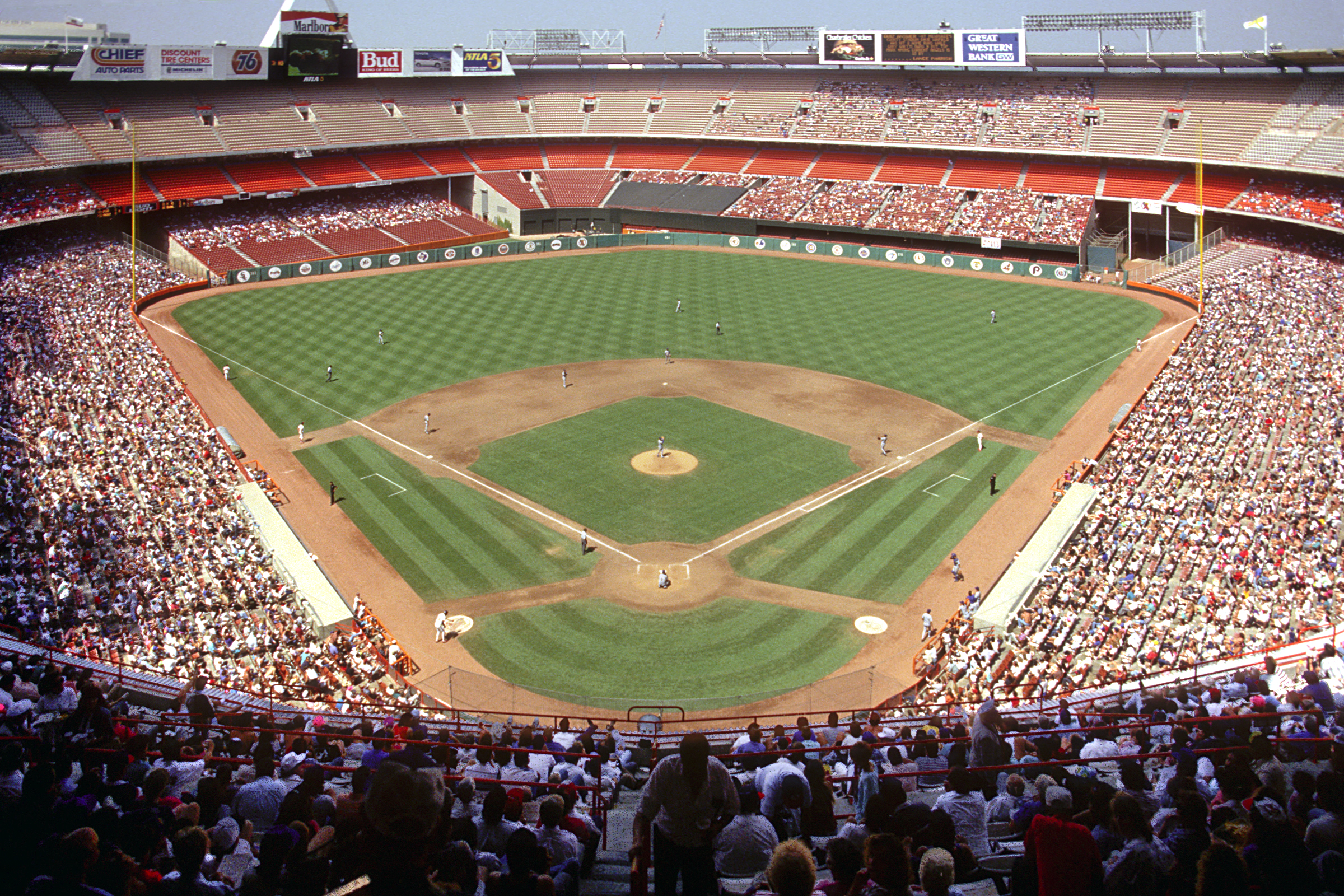
Angel Stadium (enclosed), 1991

The team's founder, entertainer Gene Autry, owned the franchise for its first 36 years. During Autry's ownership, the team made the postseason three times, but never won the pennant. The team has gone through several name changes in their history, first changing their name from Los Angeles Angels to California Angels on September 2, 1965, with a month still left in the season, in recognition of their upcoming move to the newly constructed Anaheim Stadium in Anaheim at the start of the 1966 season.

In 1997, The Walt Disney Company (already the owner of the then Mighty Ducks of Anaheim of the NHL) took control of the team in preparation for a plan to establish a rival cable channel that would've been called "ESPN West." The team extensively renovated Anaheim Stadium, which was then renamed Edison International Field of Anaheim. The City of Anaheim contributed $30 million to the $118 million renovation with a renegotiated lease providing that the names of both the stadium and team contain the word Anaheim. The team was renamed the Anaheim Angels and became a subsidiary of Disney Sports, Inc. (later renamed Anaheim Sports, Inc.). In 1998, the ESPN West plan fell through. On September 26, 2002, the Angels clinched their first playoff spot in 16 years and it was also reported that Disney hired Lehman Brothers, an investment bank, in preparation to sell the team. With just one All-Star (Garret Anderson, named as a reserve) under leadership of manager Mike Scioscia, the Angels won their first pennant and World Series championship in 2002.

In 2005, owner Arte Moreno added Los Angeles to the team's name. In compliance with the terms of its lease with the city of Anaheim, which required Anaheim be a part of the team's name, the team was officially renamed the Los Angeles Angels of Anaheim. Fans, residents, and the municipal governments of both Anaheim and Los Angeles objected to the change, with the City of Anaheim pursuing litigation; nevertheless, the change was eventually upheld in court and the city dropped its lawsuit in 2009. The team usually refers to itself as the Angels or Angels Baseball in its home media market, and the name Los Angeles never appears in the stadium, on the Angels' uniforms, nor on official team merchandise. However, throughout the team's history in Anaheim, the uniforms have traditionally said "Angels" instead of the city or state name, depending on the team's geographic identifier at the time. Local media in Southern California tend to omit a geographic identifier and refer to the team as the Angels or the Halos. Due to this agreement, Topps baseball cards have also omitted the geographic identifier from any of the team’s official trading cards. The Associated Press, the most prominent news service in the U.S., refers to the team as the Los Angeles Angels, the Angels, or Los Angeles. In 2013, the team officially planned to drop of Anaheim from its name and restore its original name Los Angeles Angels, as part of a new Angel Stadium lease negotiated with the Anaheim city government. Although the deal was never finalized, as of 2020, most official sources omit the of Anaheim suffix. In August 2026, the California State Legislature enacted the "Home Run for Anaheim Act" which would require that the Angels return to the Anaheim Angels name if the city of Anaheim were to grant an exception to the California Surplus Land Act so as to allow the Angels to develop the land around Angel Stadium without prioritizing public housing.

On December 20, 2019, the city of Anaheim voted to sell Angel Stadium and the land around it to a group led by the team owner Arte Moreno for $325 million. The deal would have included a new or refurbished stadium, 5,175 apartments and condominiums, 2.7 million square feet (251,000 square meters) of office space, and 1.1 million square feet (102,000 square meters) of retail stores, restaurants and hotels. The deal was later canceled by the city council due to bribery and corruption allegations by the FBI on the deal between an Angels Baseball employee and Anaheim mayor Harry Sidhu, allegedly in exchange for a $1 million campaign contribution toward the mayor's reelection. Mayor Sidhu resigned on May 24, 2022. In 2023 the Angels scored a franchise record 25 runs against the Rockies, scoring 13 runs in the third inning alone.

On September 1, 2026, Stan Kroenke, owner of the Los Angeles Rams, announced his intention to buy the Angels from the Moreno family. According to a joint statement released by Kroenke and Arte Moreno, the franchise sale process is expected to conclude in early 2027, although an exact sale price has yet to be revealed. On October 21, 2026, the Angels released a statement that manager Kurt Suzuki’s option would be declined and that, in coordination with Kroenke Sports and Entertainment, the team would be seeking a new manager and coaching staff for the 2027 season.

== Culture ==
The mantra "Win One for the Cowboy" is a staple that is deeply rooted in Angels history for fans. The saying refers to the Angels' founder and previous owner, Gene Autry, who never saw his Angels win a World Series in his 38 years as owner. Years went by as the team experienced many losses just strikes away from American League pennants. By the time the Angels won their first World Series in 2002, Autry had been dead for four years. After winning the World Series, Angels player Tim Salmon ran into the home dugout and brought out one of Autry's signature white Stetson hats in honor of the "singing cowboy." Autry's #26 was retired as the 26th man on the field for the Angels.

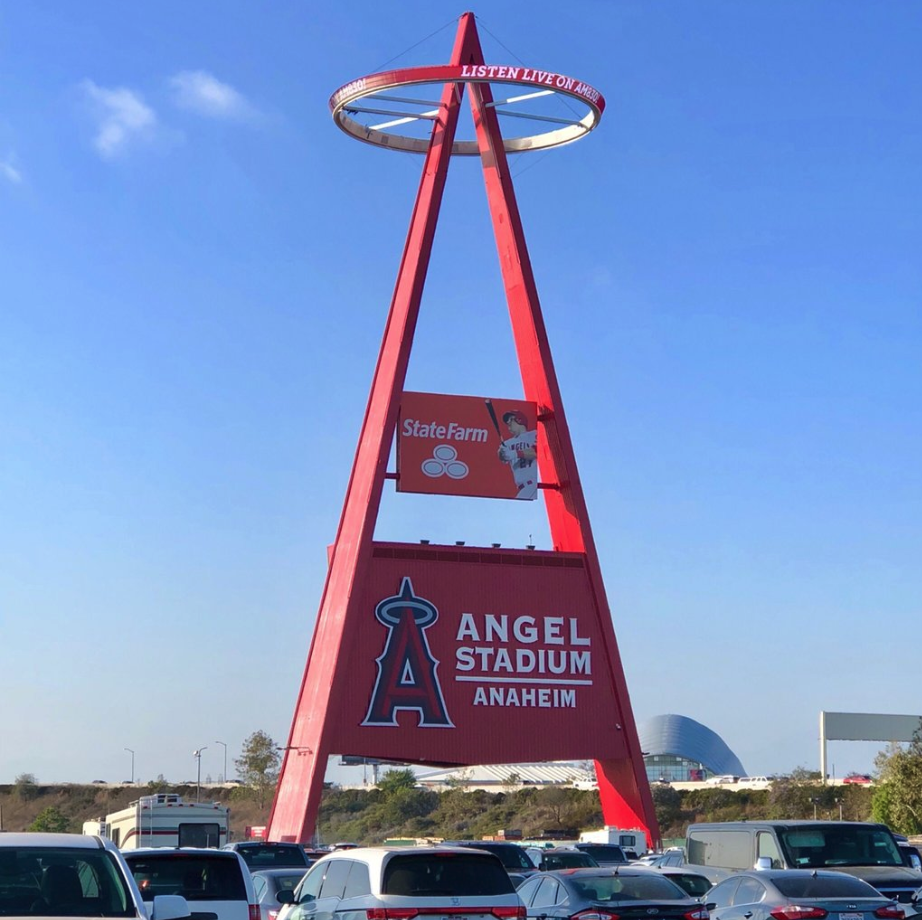
The "Big A" at Angel Stadium

Angel Stadium of Anaheim is nicknamed "The Big A." It has a section in center field nicknamed the "California Spectacular," a formation of artificial rocks made to look like a desert mountain in California. The California Spectacular has a running waterfall, and also shoots fireworks from the rocks before every game; anytime the Angels hit a home run or win a home game the fireworks shoot from the rocks as well.

Each game begins with the song "Calling All Angels" by Train being played accompanied by a video that shows historical moments in team history.

Since 2024, the Angels' home run song has been "Dance With Me" by Blink-182. Previous home run songs include "Song 2" by Blur, "Chelsea Dagger" by The Fratellis, "Kernkraft 400" by Zombie Nation, "Killin' It" by Krewella, and "Bro Hymn" by Pennywise

After an Angels home win, the phrase "Light That Baby Up!" is used in reference to Angel Stadium's landmark 230-foot (70 m) tall letter "A" with a halo surrounding the top, which lights up every time the Angels win a home game. Other phrases associated with Angel wins include "Just another Halo victory!", popularized by late Angels broadcaster Rory Markas; and before that: "And the Halo shines tonight!" used by legendary broadcaster Dick Enberg.

The Angels organization was the first North American team to employ the use of thundersticks.

=== The Rally Monkey ===
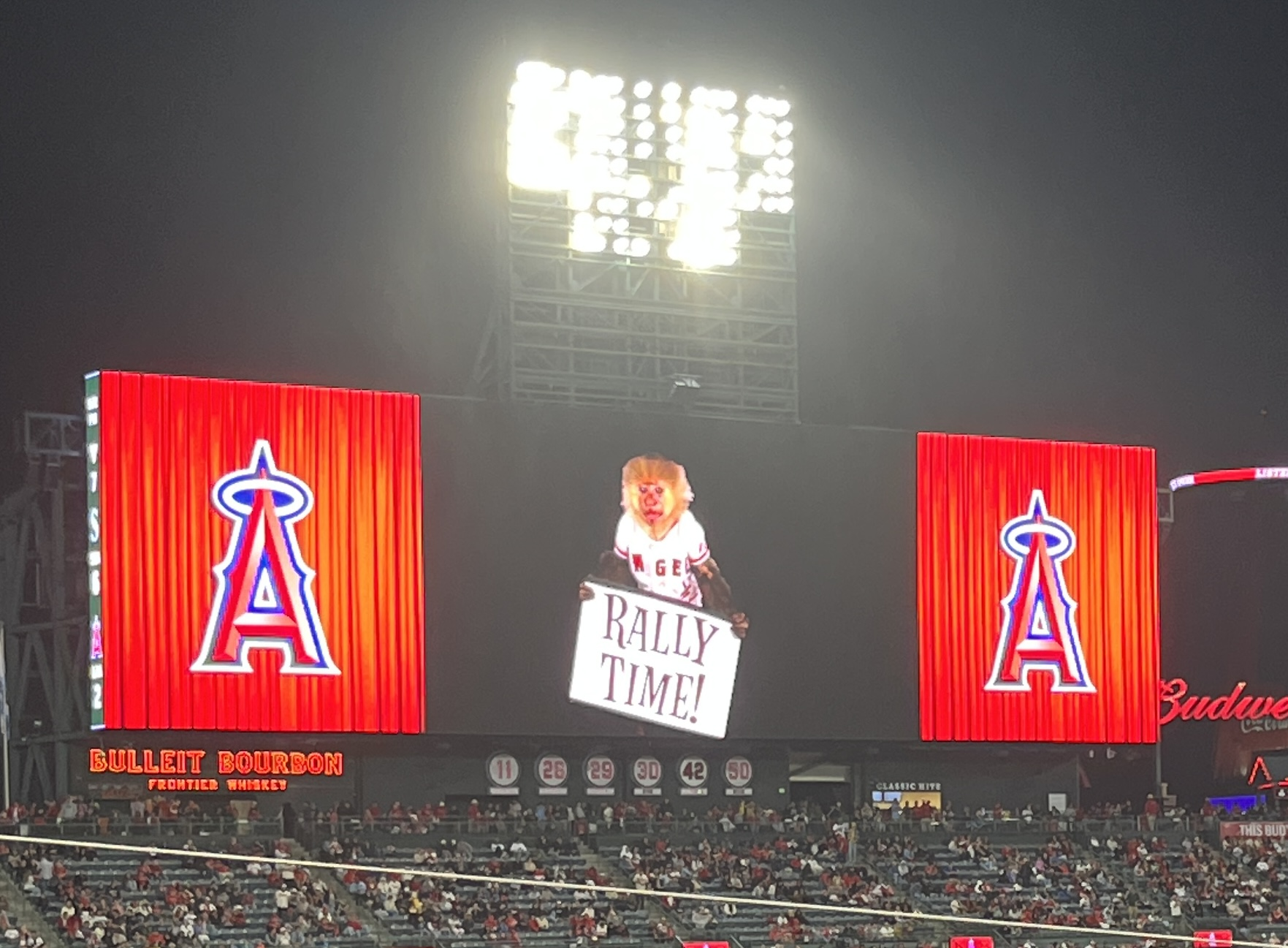
The Rally Monkey on the jumbotron at Angel Stadium - 2023

The Rally Monkey is a mascot for the Angels which appears if the Angels are losing a game or if the game is tied from the 7th inning on, but sometimes earlier depending on the situation. The Rally Monkey appears on the scoreboard in various movies or pop culture references that have been edited to include him.

The Rally Monkey was born in 2000 when the scoreboard showed a clip from Ace Ventura: Pet Detective, after which the Angels rallied to win the game. The clip proved to be so popular that the team hired Katie, a white-haired capuchin monkey, to star in original clips for later games. When seen, she jumps up and down to the House of Pain song "Jump Around" and holds a sign that says "RALLY TIME!"

The Rally Monkey came to national and worldwide attention during the Angels' appearance in the 2002 World Series against the San Francisco Giants. In the Game 6 of the series, the Angels were playing at home, but were trailing the series three games to two and facing elimination. They were down 5–0 as the game entered the bottom of the 7th inning. Amid fervid rally-monkey themed fan support, the Angels proceeded to score six unanswered runs over the next two innings, winning the game and turning the momentum of the series for good (they went on to clinch the championship in Game 7).

From 2004 to 2009, the Angels reached the postseason five times, sparking a renewal of the Rally Monkey's popularity.

== Popularity ==
The Angels drew more than 3 million fans per year to the stadium from 2003 to 2019, at least 2 million per year since 2002, and a game average in 2010, 2011, 2012, and 2013 of 40,000 fans at each game despite not making the playoffs all four years. This is 2nd in all of MLB, only trailing the New York Yankees. In 2019, the Angels were fifth in MLB in attendance, with a total of 3,019,012 people.

As of 2015, the Angels fans have set six Guinness World Records for the largest gatherings of people wearing blankets, wrestling masks, cowboy hats, wigs, Santa hats, superhero capes, and sombreros. They have also set the world record for largest gathering of people with selfie sticks. In 2009, the Angels were voted as the number one franchise in professional sports in Fan Value by ESPN magazine. In 2012, ESPN & Fan polls by ESPN ranked the Angels fifteenth in the best sports franchises, third best among MLB teams. The rankings were determined through a combination of sports analysts and fan votes ranking all sports franchises by a combination of average fan attendance, fan relations, "Bang for your Buck" or winning percentage over the past 3 years, ownership, affordability, stadium experience, players effort on the field and likability, coaching, and "Title Track."

Home attendance at Angel Stadium
Year	Total attendance	Game average	MLB rank
2005	3,404,686	42,033	4th
2006	3,406,790	42,059	5th
2007	3,365,632	41,551	5th
2008	3,336,744	41,194	6th
2009	3,240,374	40,004	5th
2010	3,250,816	40,133	5th
2011	3,166,321	39,090	5th
2012	3,061,770	37,799	7th
2013	3,019,505	37,277	7th
2014	3,095,935	38,221	5th
2015	3,012,765	37,194	5th
2016	3,016,142	37,236	7th
2017	3,019,583	37,278	7th
2018	3,020,216	37,286	6th
2019	3,023,010	37,321	5th
2020	0 (Note: No fans were allowed at games during the 2020 Major League Baseball regular season due to the COVID-19 pandemic.)	N/A	N/A
2021	1,512,033 (Note: Angel Stadium operated at 33% capacity From April to June 17 due to the COVID-19 pandemic.)	18,667	16th
2022	2,457,461	30,339	13th
2023	2,640,575	32,599	13th
2024	2,577,597	31,822	13th
2025	2,615,506	32,290	13th

== Logos, uniforms and colors ==
The Angels' current alternate wordmark

The Angels' current primary wordmark

The Los Angeles Angels have used ten different logos and three different color combinations throughout their history. Their first two logos depict a baseball with wings and a halo over a baseball diamond with the letters "L" and "A" over it in different styles. The original team colors were the predominantly blue with a red trim. This color scheme would be in effect for most of the franchise's history lasting from 1961 to 1996.

On September 2, 1965, with the team still playing in Los Angeles at Chavez Ravine, Autry changed its name from the "Los Angeles Angels" to the "California Angels" due to the club's impending move to Anaheim in 1966. During the 31 years of being known as the "California Angels," the team kept the previous color scheme, however, their logo did change six times during this period. The first logo under this name was very similar to the previous "LA" logo, the only difference was instead of an interlocking "LA," there was an interlocking "CA."

The Angels' original home white uniforms featured the team name and numbers in red trimmed in blue, while the road gray uniforms featured the city name and numbers in blue trimmed in red. The numbers featured the same McAuliffe font found on the Boston Red Sox uniforms; both the Angels and Red Sox uniforms at the time were manufactured by McAuliffe Sporting Goods. The team's cap is blue with a red bill, featuring an interlocking "LA" in red trimmed in white, with a white halo atop the blue crown. After rebranding as the California Angels, the road uniform was changed to feature only the team name, and the cap logo was changed to an interlocking "CA." In 1970, a sleeve patch depicting a gold halo atop the California outline and a gold star depicting Anaheim was added on the left sleeve.

It was in 1965, while the stadium was being finished, that Bud Furillo (of the Herald Examiner) coined its nickname, "the Big A" after the tall letter A that once stood beyond left-center field and served as the ballpark's primary scoreboard (it was relocated to a section of the parking lot southeast of the stadium in 1980 when the facility was enclosed and expanded for the NFL's Los Angeles Rams.).

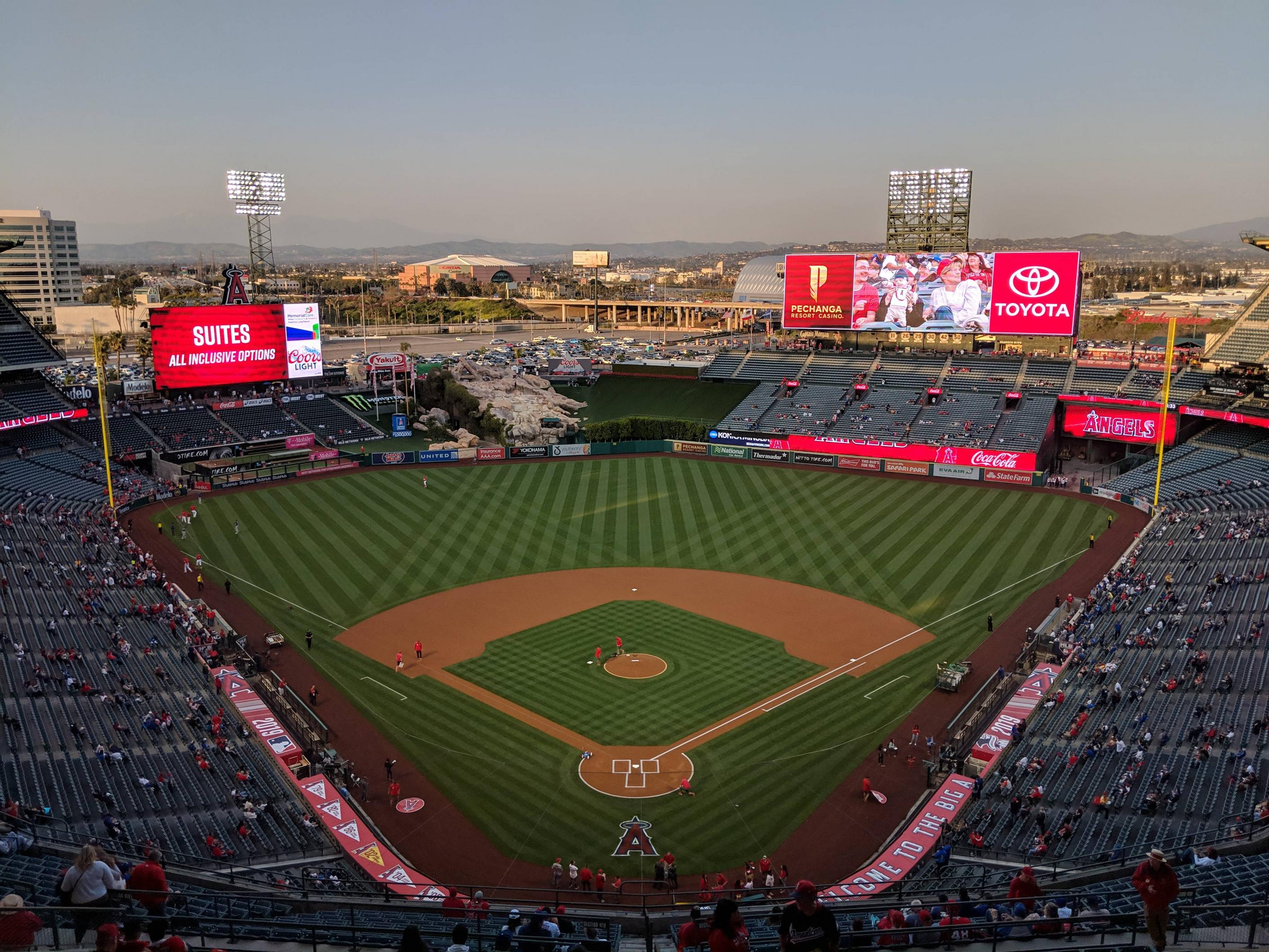
Angel Stadium

Directly after this from 1971 to 1985, the Angels adopted a logo that had the word "Angels" written on an outline of the State of California. The uniforms initially featured lowercase letters on the "Angels" wordmark, with a gold halo affixed atop the "a." An updated cap featured the lowercase "a" below a gold halo. For 1972, however, the cap logo was changed to "the Big A," while the road uniform lettering was updated to red trimmed in white. The following year saw "the Big A" integrated to the team's uniforms (replacing the lowercase "a"), which are now in a pullover style, and the road uniforms letters now incorporating blue trim. Player names were used on-and-off with this design, while the numbers were changed to a more basic block design by 1979. In 1986, the Angels adopted the "big A" in front of a baseball as their new logo, with the shadow of California in the background. This became the team's sleeve patch while keeping most of the uniform intact. The cap logo was also thickened to reflect this change. In 1989, the Angels reverted to wearing buttons with this uniform.

After the "big A" was done in 1992, the Angels returned to their roots and re-adopted the interlocking "CA" logo with some differences. The Angels used this logo from 1993 to 1996, during that time, the "CA" was either on top of a blue circle or with nothing else. The team's uniforms were largely influenced by the original 1960s uniforms, while also incorporating blue piping and the "CA" on the left sleeve. The blue cap with red bill remained as the home cap, while a new all-blue cap was used as a road cap. In 1995, the Angels added a blue alternate uniform with white piping, incorporating the "CA" on the left chest and the team name on the left sleeve.

After the renovations of then-Anaheim Stadium and the takeover by the Walt Disney Company, the Angels changed their name to the "Anaheim Angels" along with changing the logo and color scheme. The first logo under Disney removed the halo and had a rather cartoon-like "ANGELS" script with a wing on the "A" over a periwinkle plate and crossed bats. With this change, the Angels' color scheme changed to dark blue and periwinkle. The team's home and road uniforms incorporated a faux-vest style with dark blue pinstripes and sleeves; chest numbers and player names are in dark blue while back numbers are in red trimmed in white with dark blue drop shadows. A sleeve patch featuring "Anaheim" in metallic gold superimposed over a "big A" in periwinkle with a gold halo was also unveiled. A dark blue alternate featured the "winged A" on the left chest and red numbers trimmed in white with periwinkle drop shadows. This uniform initially had periwinkle sleeves and navy numbers before it was updated with periwinkle piping, white numbers and without the contrasting sleeves, and later on incorporated the "Angels" wordmark. The team primarily wore an all-dark blue cap along with a periwinkle-brimmed dark blue alternate cap; both caps featured the "winged A."

After a run with the "winged" logo from 1997 to 2001, Disney changed the Angels' logo back to a "Big A" with a silver halo over a dark blue baseball diamond. With this logo change, the colors changed to the team's current color scheme: predominantly red with some dark blue and white. The team's uniforms reflected this change, using red letters trimmed in dark blue and silver, and red caps with the updated "Big A." At one point the team wore two different home uniforms: one in a traditional style, and another in a vest style with red undershirts.

When the team's name changed from the "Anaheim Angels" to the "Los Angeles Angels of Anaheim" in 2005, the logo changed only slightly, the name "ANAHEIM ANGELS" and the blue baseball diamond were removed leaving only the "Big A." The road uniform was changed from the city name to the team name, and in 2007, a red alternate uniform was released, also incorporating red letters throughout. In 2010, a new sleeve patch was added, styled similarly to the 1986–1992 "baseball A" logo but with a red border incorporating "Angels Baseball" and the foundation year inside.

For the 2011 season, as part of the 50th anniversary of the Angels franchise, the halo on the 'Big A' logo temporarily changed colors from silver to old gold, paying tribute to the Angels logos of the past (and also the 50th Anniversary tradition of gold). The uniforms also reflected the change to the gold halo for this season, which was added on the right sleeve.

During the 50th Anniversary season the players wore throwback jerseys at each Friday home game reflecting all the different logos and uniforms previously worn by players. Also, Angels alumni from past seasons threw the ceremonial first pitch at every home game during the 50th Anniversary season.

A new patch was added on the uniforms before the 2012 season, similar to the 2010 left sleeve patch minus the baseball behind the "A." With this new patch, the Angels' A with the halo now appears on three different locations of the jersey: the right shoulder, the wordmark, and the left shoulder.

In 2022, the Angels unveiled a City Connect uniform, featuring a sand base and a script 'Angels" wordmark with an underline past the "s." Dark blue numbers on the left chest incorporated a red diamond outline, while a roundel sleeve patch featuring the team name surrounding the "A" was also added. On the left sleeve, red stripes were featured. The red cap featured a sand front panel with the "A" taken from the wordmark. This look was heavily inspired by the surfing culture of Southern California.

Los Angeles Angels logo from 1961–1965

California Angels logo from 1966–1970

California Angels logo from 1971–1972

California Angels logo from 1972–1988

California Angels logo from 1989–1992

California Angels logo from 1993–1996

Anaheim Angels logo from 1997–2001

== Rivalries ==
The Angels have historically developed rivalries with other AL West members: the Oakland Athletics, Seattle Mariners, Texas Rangers, and, to a lesser extent, the Houston Astros, who joined the division in 2013. The Angels also considered the New York Yankees and the Boston Red Sox rivals due to a total of seven postseason series against the two teams in the 2000s. The Los Angeles Dodgers are considered a geographical rival as the two teams share the Greater Los Angeles television market.

=== Athletics ===
The Angels have held a steady rivalry with the Athletics since their relocation to California and to the AL West in 1968 and 1969. Though not as intense as the Dodgers–Giants rivalry equivalent in the National League; the A's and Angels have often been competitive in their own battle for the division through the decades. The peak of the rivalry was during the early part of the millennium as both teams were stellar and perennial contenders. But even then, there were only two down-to-the-wire finishes between the Angels and the A's during that time. During the 2002 season; both teams were proving to be contenders as the A's famous Moneyball tactics led them to a league record 20 game winstreak; knocking the Angels out of 1st place in the division, finishing 4 games ahead while the Angels secured the Wild Card berth. Despite the 103 win season for Oakland; they would fall in a shocking upset to the Minnesota Twins in the ALDS. The Angels managed to pull off an underdog victory over both the New York Yankees and the Twins, and went all the way to the franchise's first and only World Series victory. During the 2004 season, both teams came down to the wire: tied for wins headed into the final week of September with the last three games being played in Oakland against the Angels. Both teams were battling to secure the division title; however, Oakland fell in 2 crushing losses to the Angels with only one victory in the series coming in the final game. Oakland would find themselves eliminated from the playoff hunt, though the Angels would go on to suffer a crushing sweep at the hands of the eventual champion Boston Red Sox. The Athletics lead the series 527-479; the two teams have yet to meet in the postseason.

=== Seattle Mariners ===
The Angels have maintained a steady rivalry with the Seattle Mariners as both teams have often fought for control of the division or a playoff berth. During 1995, the Angels held a season-high 13-game division lead over the Mariners on August 2, but by September 26, Seattle had taken over the division lead by three games with only five games remaining in the season. The 1995 season culminated in dramatic fashion with both teams tied for first place, resulting in a tie-breaker game to determine the division winner. Both teams continued to clash for playoff positions during the early 2000s as the Mariners boasted a 116 win team in 2001 while the Angels managed to win the World Series in 2002. Despite both teams encountering a decline through the decade, regular matchups often developed into clashes for relevance in the division. Recently; both teams have been fighting for their own respective position in search of the postseason as both sides have been bolstered with such talents as Julio Rodríguez and Ty France for Seattle or Shohei Ohtani and Mike Trout for the Angels The two teams have met 717 times with the Angels leading the series 388-329, both teams have yet to meet in the postseason.

=== Texas Rangers ===
The Angels' rivalry with the Texas Rangers has been said to have developed over a domination in the division between the two teams, and also in recent years more animosity between the two teams due to players who have played for both teams, including Nolan Ryan, Mike Napoli, Darren Oliver, Vladimir Guerrero, C. J. Wilson, and Josh Hamilton. In 2012, Wilson played a joke on Napoli, his former teammate, by tweeting his phone number, causing Napoli to exchange words with Wilson. The feuds go back to two incidents between Angels second baseman Adam Kennedy and Rangers catcher Gerald Laird which led to punches being thrown.

The Angels and Rangers have each pitched a perfect game against each other, making them the only pair of MLB teams to have done so. Mike Witt pitched a perfect game for the Angels against the Rangers in 1984 at Arlington Stadium and Kenny Rogers for the Rangers against the Angels in 1994.

=== Los Angeles Dodgers ===
The rivalry with the Los Angeles Dodgers has been referred to as the Freeway Series because of the freeway system (mostly via Interstate 5) linking the two teams' home fields. The Freeway Series is one of four MLB rivalries between two teams in the same metropolitan area.

From 1962 to 1965, the Angels played their home games at Dodger Stadium. Dodgers owner Walter O'Malley granted approval for an American League franchise in Los Angeles under the condition that they play at Dodger Stadium. As a result, Angels owner Gene Autry signed a three-year deal to rent the stadium with a subsequent four option years. On May 5, 1962, Angels pitcher Bo Belinsky pitched the first no-hitter in Dodger Stadium history in a game against the Baltimore Orioles.

With the introduction of interleague play in the 1997 season, the Angels and Dodgers played each other in the regular season for the first time with a two-game series beginning on June 17 at Dodger Stadium. A bench-clearing brawl occurred during a June 1999 series between the two teams when Angels pitcher Tim Belcher tagged out Dodgers pitcher Chan Ho Park after his at-bat, leading to an exchange of words that was followed by Park punching and kicking Belcher. Park was ejected from the game and subsequently suspended for seven games.

On December 9, 2023, Angels star pitcher and hitter Shohei Ohtani signed with the Dodgers in free agency, signing what was the largest contract in professional sports history until a year later.

== Radio and television ==
The flagship radio station of the Angels is Orange, California-licensed KLAA 830 AM, a station owned by the team. The broadcast features Terry Smith providing play-by-play commentary since 2002 and Mark Langston providing color commentary since 2012. KLAA replaced KSPN (710 AM), on which frequency had aired most Angels games since the team's inception in 1961. The station, then known as KMPC and owned by Gene Autry, aired games from 1961 to 1996. In 1997 and 1998, the flagship station was KRLA (1110 AM). In 1999, it was replaced by KLAC (570 AM) for five seasons, including the 2002 championship season. In 2003, the Angels returned to KSPN, a partnership that lasted until 2007. Spanish-language Angels broadcasts are hosted on KWKW (1330 AM) with José Tolentino providing play-by-play commentary.

Angels games are televised on cable channel Angels Broadcast Television (ABTV), formerly FanDuel Sports Network West (FDSNW). The broadcast booth features Wayne Randazzo as play-by-play announcer since 2023 and Mark Gubicza serving as color commentator since 2007. Trent Rush provides play-by-play commentary for select games when Randazzo is working the national Friday Night Baseball broadcast. As the Angels share the network with the Los Angeles Kings ice hockey team, sister channels FanDuel Sports Network SoCal and KCOP-TV may be used for broadcasts in the event of a scheduling conflict; in 2025, the relationship with KCOP expanded to include simulcasts of 12 games during the regular season.

The Angels had been affiliated with FDSNW since the 1993 season when the network was originally known as Prime Ticket. The network has changed names multiple times since, including Prime Sports West, Fox Sports Net West, Fox Sports West, and Bally Sports West. In March 2026, in the wake of financial uncertainties surrounding the ownership of FanDuel Sports Network West, the Angels would elect to purchase the channel outright. Over-the-air station KTLA carried Angels games from 1964 to 1995 as both entities were owned by Gene Autry. KCAL-TV has twice held Angels broadcast rights, originally from 1961 to 1963 under the name of KHJ-TV and again from 1996 to 2005. Dick Enberg served as the Angels play-by-play announcer for KTLA from 1969 to 1978 and later won the Ford C. Frick Award in 2015 for his work with the team. Enberg was known for his signature "And the halo shines tonight" call after Angels wins in reference to the Big A sign. Former play-by-play announcer Victor Rojas (2010–2020) followed every Angels win by saying "Light that baby up," also a reference to the sign.

== Awards and honors ==
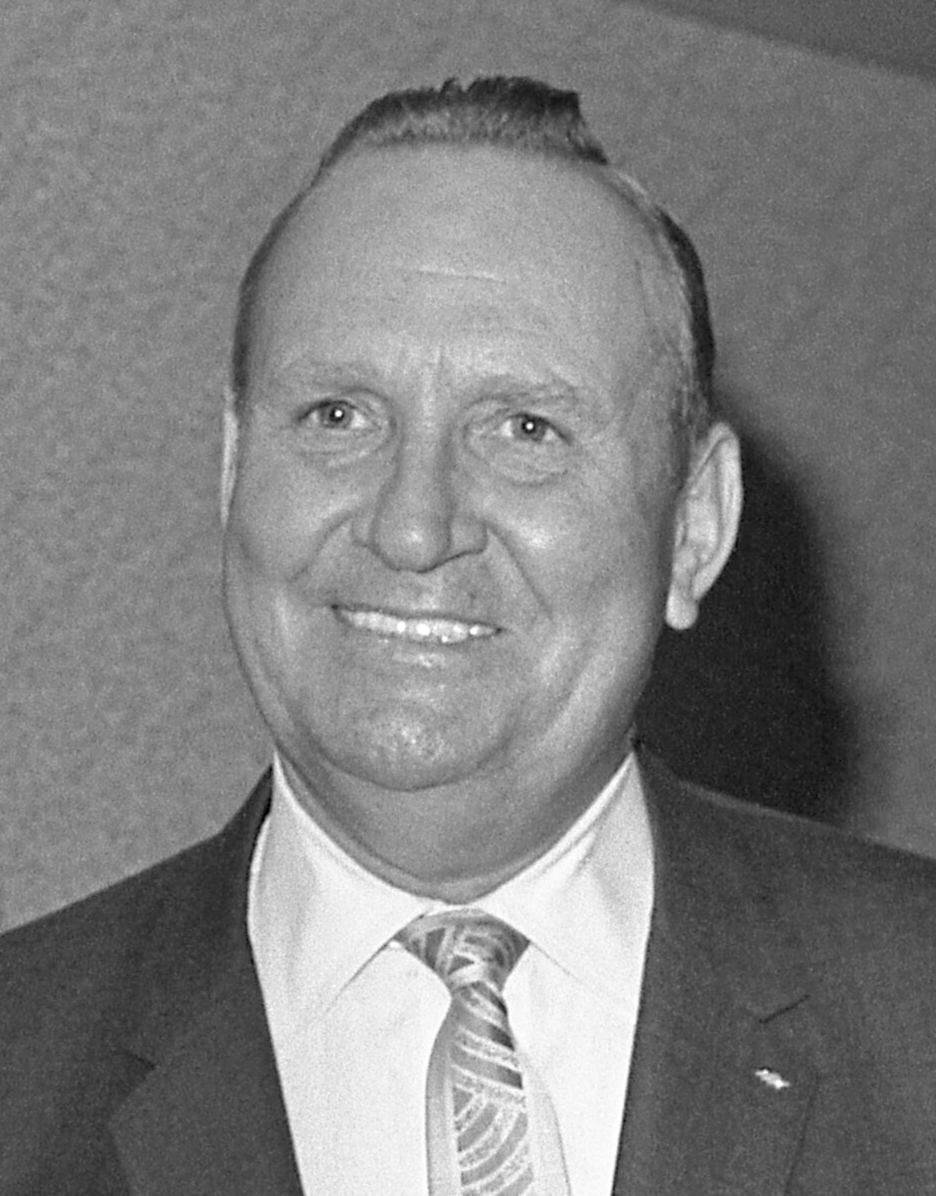
Gene Autry, team founder and owner (1960–1998)

=== Retired numbers ===
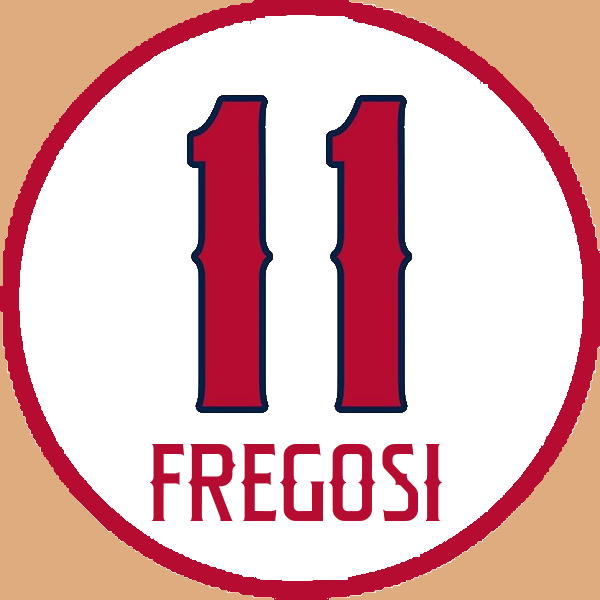
Jim
Fregosi
SS, Manager
Retired August 1, 1998
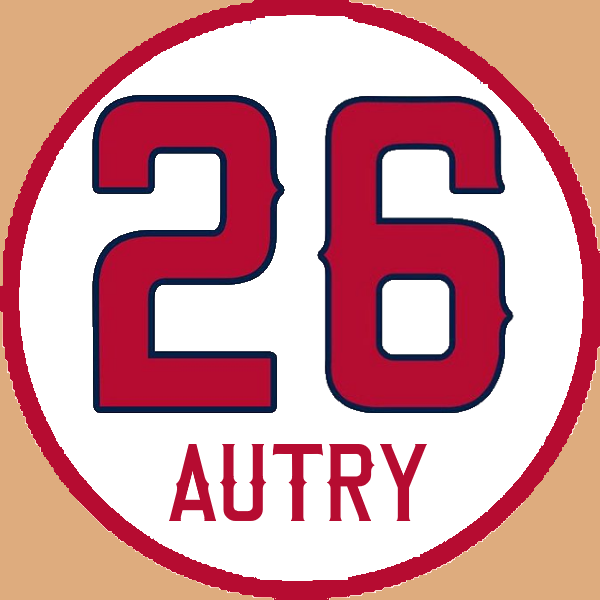
Gene
Autry
Team Founder
Retired October 3, 1982
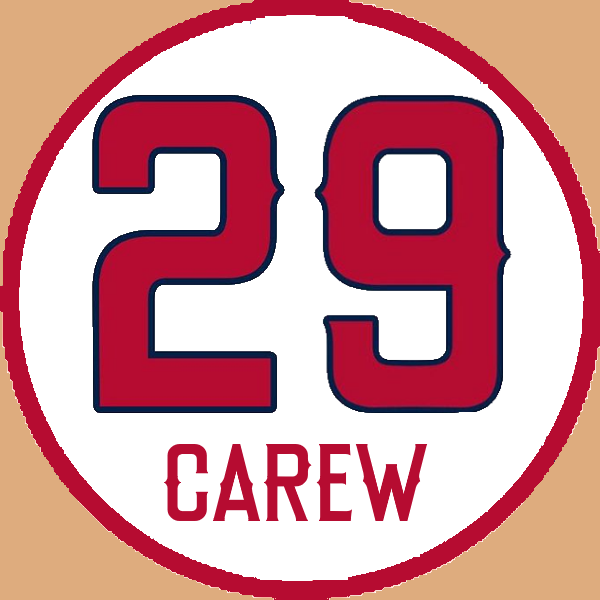
Rod
Carew
1B, Coach
Retired August 12, 1986
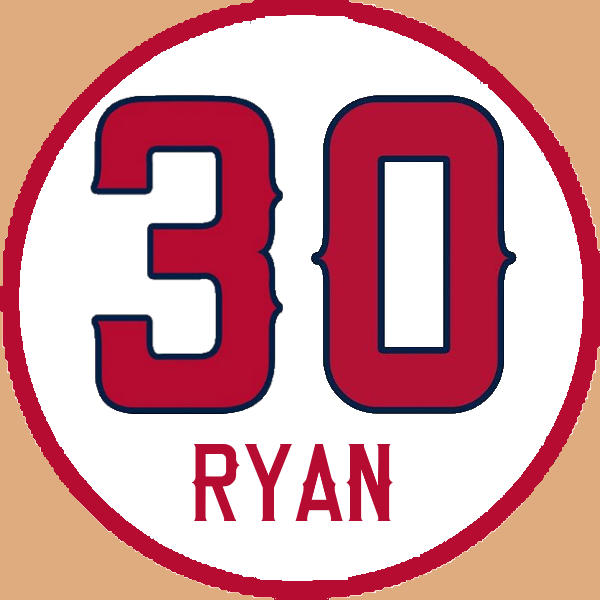
Nolan
Ryan
P
Retired June 16, 1992
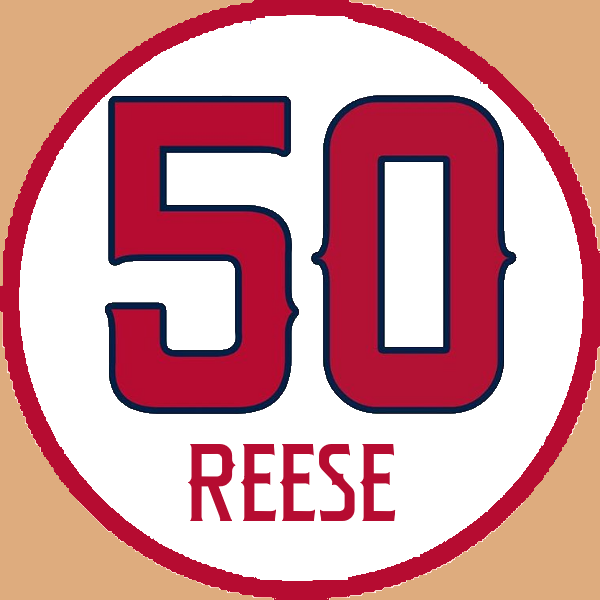
Jimmie
Reese
Coach
Retired August 2, 1995
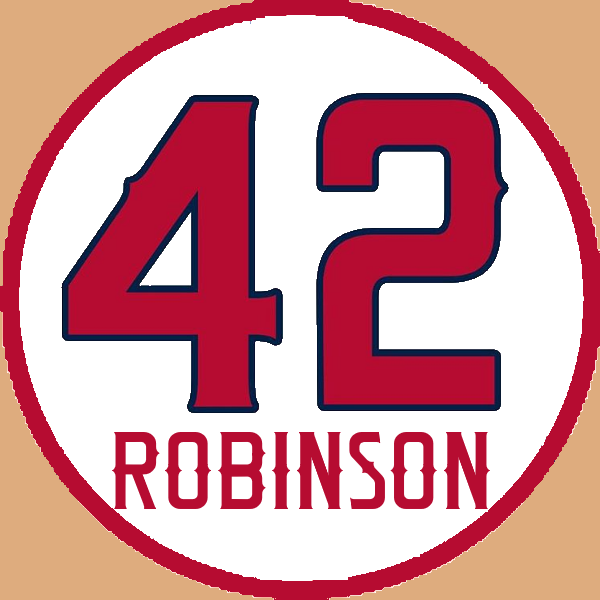
Jackie
Robinson
All MLB
Honored April 15, 1997
- No. 26 was retired for Gene Autry to indicate he was the team's "26th Man" (25 was, at the time, the player limit for any MLB team's active roster, except in September)
- No. 42 was retired throughout Major League Baseball in 1997 to honor Jackie Robinson.

==== Out of circulation, but not retired ====
- No. 0 has been out of circulation since the release of Yunel Escobar.
- No. 1 has been out of circulation since the retirement of Bengie Molina.
- No. 34 was out of circulation since the death of Nick Adenhart in 2009, until worn by Noah Syndergaard in 2022. In 2024, it was worn by Zach Plesac and Eric Wagaman. In 2026, it was briefly worn by Trey Mancini.
- No. 45 has been out of circulation since the death of Tyler Skaggs in 2019.

=== Angels Hall of Fame ===
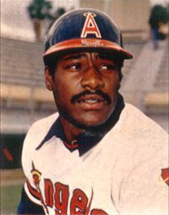
Don Baylor, the first Angels player to win the AL MVP award, was inducted into the team Hall of Fame in 1990.

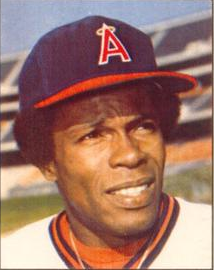
Angels infielder and coach Rod Carew was inducted into the team's Hall of Fame in 1991.

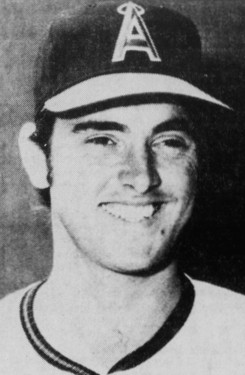
Pitcher Nolan Ryan threw four no-hitters with the Angels and was inducted into the franchise Hall of Fame in 1992.

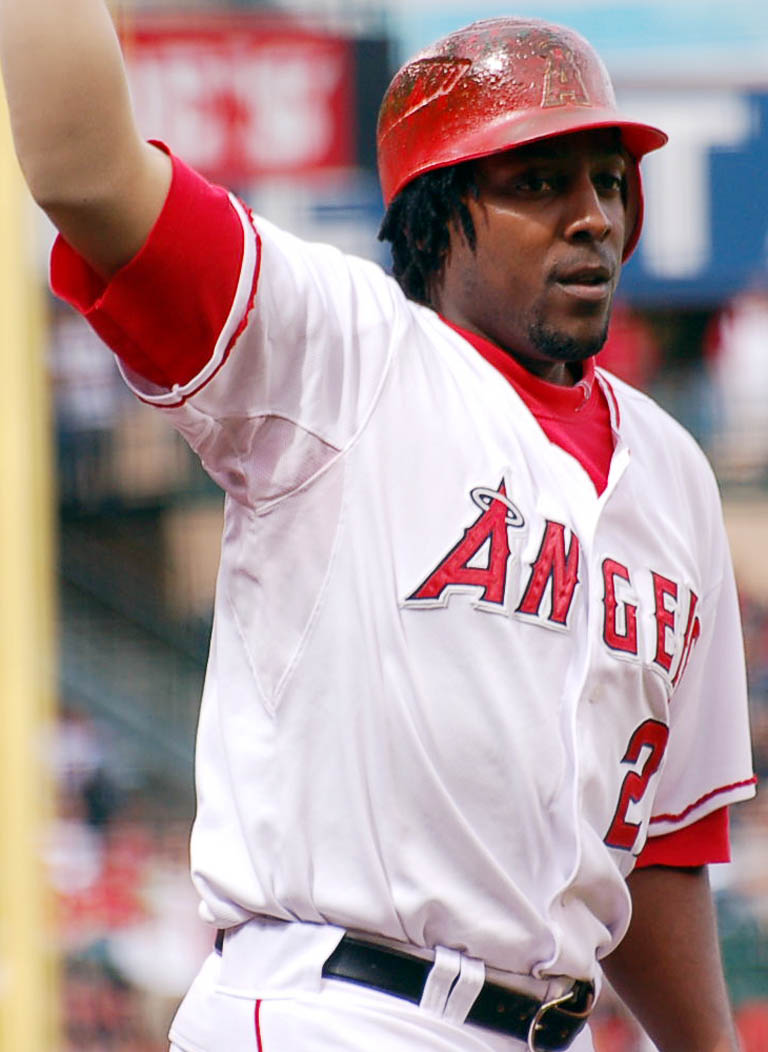
Angels outfielder Vladimir Guerrero won an MVP with the Angels in 2004 and was inducted to the team Hall of Fame in 2017.

The Angels established a team Hall of Fame in 1988. They have inducted fifteen individuals (fourteen players and one executive) along with members of the 2002 team.

Key
Year	Year inducted
**Bold**	Member of the Baseball Hall of Fame
†	Member of the Baseball Hall of Fame as an Angel

**Angels Hall of Fame**
Year	No.	Name	Position(s)	Tenure
1988	4	Bobby Grich	2B	1977–1986
1989	11	Jim Fregosi	SS; Manager	1961–1971; 1978–1981
1990	12, 25	Don Baylor	DH/LF	1977–1982
1991	29	**Rod Carew**	1B; Coach	1979–1985; 1992–1999
1992	30	**Nolan Ryan**	P	1972–1979
1995	50	Jimmie Reese	Coach	1972–1994
2009	5, 9	Brian Downing	DH/LF/C	1978–1990
2009	31	Chuck Finley	P	1986–1999
2011	26	Gene Autry	Owner/Founder	1961–1998
2012	2002 World Series Team			
2013	29	Bobby Knoop	2B; Coach	1964–1969; 1979–1996, 2013–2018
2015	31	Dean Chance	P	1961–1966
2015	15	Tim Salmon	RF	1992–2006
2015	39	Mike Witt	P	1981–1990
2016	16	Garret Anderson	LF	1994–2008
2017	27	**Vladimir Guerrero**†	RF/DH	2004–2009

=== Team captains ===
- Jerry Remy, 1977
- Don Baylor, 1978–1982

=== Baseball Hall of Fame ===
Several Hall of Famers have spent part of their careers with the Angels and the Hall lists the Angels as the "primary team" (Note: Since 2015, inductee biographies for players, managers, and many executives at the Hall of Fame's website include a "primary team". This listing does not necessarily match an inductee's cap logo.) of Nolan Ryan. Additionally, the Angels have one member in the Hall of Fame wearing an Angels cap insignia, Vladimir Guerrero, who was inducted in 2018.

Los Angeles Angels Hall of Famers
Affiliation according to the National Baseball Hall of Fame and Museum
California Angels

Bert Blyleven
Rod Carew

Whitey Herzog
Reggie Jackson
Dave Parker

Frank Robinson
Nolan Ryan *

Lee Smith
Don Sutton
Hoyt Wilhelm

Dick Williams
Dave Winfield

Anaheim Angels

Rickey Henderson

Eddie Murray

Los Angeles Angels of Anaheim

**Vladimir Guerrero**

- Players and managers listed in **bold** are depicted on their Hall of Fame plaques wearing a Angels cap insignia.
- * California / Los Angeles Angels listed as primary team according to the Hall of Fame

==== Ford C. Frick Award recipients ====
Los Angeles Angels Ford C. Frick Award recipients
Affiliation according to the National Baseball Hall of Fame and Museum

Jerry Coleman

Dave Niehaus

**Dick Enberg**

Joe Garagiola

- **Names in bold** received the award based primarily on their work as broadcasters for the Angels.

== Roster ==
Los Angeles Angels 2027 spring training roster
40-man roster		Non-roster invitees	Coaches / other
Pitchers: 61 Sam Aldegheri; 40 Sam Bachman; 36 Caden Dana; 48 Reid Detmers; 70 Mitch Farris; 65 José Fermín; 32 Ryan Johnson; 44 Ben Joyce; 71 Brett Kerry; 16 Yusei Kikuchi; 58 George Klassen; 41 Jack Kochanowicz; 54 Trevor Martin; 72 Luke Murphy; 52 Samy Natera Jr.; -- Nicolò Pinazzi; 21 Grayson Rodriguez; 55 Tayler Saucedo; 57 Walbert Ureña; 56 Ryan Watson; 68 Blake Weiman	Catchers: 31 Tyler Heineman; 33 Logan Porter; Infielders: -- Nacho Alvarez Jr.; 5 Vaughn Grissom; 23 Denzer Guzmán; 4 Christian Moore; 9 Zach Neto; 2 Oswald Peraza; 18 Nolan Schanuel; Outfielders: 51 Gustavo Campero; 3 Josh Lowe; 53 Wade Meckler; 28 Jose Siri; 22 Bryce Teodosio; 27 Mike Trout; Designated hitters: 13 Moisés Ballesteros		Manager: TBA TBA; Coaches: 99 Brady Anderson (hitting); 91 Mike Ashman (batting practice pitcher); 93 Jason Brown (bullpen catcher); 95 Tim Buss (staff assistant); 92 Adam Eaton (first base and outfield); 82 Derek Florko (assistant hitting); 85 John Gibbons (bench); 89 Keith Johnson (third base); -- Tim Leveque (interim pitching); 87 John Mabry (assistant hitting); 86 Andy Schatzley (infield); 83 Max Stassi (catching); -- Michael Wuertz (interim bullpen); 37 active, 0 inactive, 0 non-roster invitees; 7-, 10-, or 15-day injured list; * Not on active roster; ^{†} Suspended list; Roster, coaches, and NRIs updated November 1, 2026; Transactions • Depth chart; → All MLB rosters

== Minor league affiliations ==
The Los Angeles Angels farm system consists of six minor league affiliates.

Class	Team	League	Location	Ballpark	Affiliated
Triple-A	Salt Lake Bees	Pacific Coast League	South Jordan, Utah	Daybreak Field at America First Square	2001
Double-A	Rocket City Trash Pandas	Southern League	Madison, Alabama	Toyota Field	2020
High-A	Tri-City Dust Devils	Northwest League	Pasco, Washington	Gesa Stadium	2021
Single-A	Rancho Cucamonga Quakes	California League	Rancho Cucamonga, California	LoanMart Field	2026
Rookie	ACL Angels	Arizona Complex League	Tempe, Arizona	Tempe Diablo Stadium	2001
Rookie	DSL Angels	Dominican Summer League	Boca Chica, Santo Domingo	Academia de Abel Garcia	1999

== In popular culture ==
- A 1985 episode of The Jeffersons titled "The Unnatural" featured the Angels. George Jefferson is disheartened after dropping a foul ball hit by Reggie Jackson on live television. Brian Downing and Mike Witt also portrayed themselves in minor roles.
- The team is featured prominently in the 1988 comedy film The Naked Gun. Police lieutenant Frank Drebin (Leslie Nielsen) secretly umpires a game between the Angels and Seattle Mariners while Reggie Jackson portrays himself in the movie.
- The 1990 comedy Taking Care of Business features a fictional World Series matchup between the Angels and the Chicago Cubs. Angels pitcher Bert Blyleven was cast in the film.
- The 1994 Disney film Angels In The Outfield features foster kid Roger (Joseph Gordon-Levitt) who loves the California Angels, even though they're the worst team in the major leagues. His estranged dad promises to reunite the family if the Angels make it to the World Series, so Roger decides to ask for some divine help and prays that his favorite team will turn things around. Soon, a real angel named Al (Christopher Lloyd) shows up in response to Roger's prayers, and Anaheim's hopeless coach (Danny Glover) is shocked to see his team on a winning streak.
- In 2014, the Angels and Angel Stadium were featured in season eight of The Big Bang Theory in an episode titled "The First Pitch Insufficiency."

== See also ==
- List of Los Angeles Angels first-round draft picks
- List of Los Angeles Angels no-hitters
- List of Los Angeles Angels Opening Day starting pitchers
- List of Los Angeles Angels owners and executives
- List of Los Angeles Angels seasons

== Notes ==
Awards and achievements
Preceded by Arizona Diamondbacks; 2001	World Series champions Anaheim Angels; 2002	Succeeded by Florida Marlins; 2003
Preceded by New York Yankees; 1998–2001	American League champions Anaheim Angels; 2002	Succeeded by New York Yankees; 2003
