= West Islip High School =

Location
- 1 Lions Path; West Islip, New York; United States; 40.7014°N 73.3045°W

Information
- Type: Public high school
- Established: 1957
- School district: West Islip Union Free School District
- Superintendent: Paul Romanelli
- Principal: Andrew O'Farrell
- Teaching staff: 122.00 (2025-26) (on an FTE basis)
- Grades: 9-12
- Enrollment: 1,163 (2025–26)
- Student to teacher ratio: 9.53 (2025-26)
- Campus: Suburban
- Colors: Blue and Gold
- Mascot: Lions
- Accreditation: Blue Ribbon: 2020
- Newspaper: Paw Prints
- Website: West Islip High School

West Islip High School is a public high school in the town of West Islip, in Suffolk County, New York on the South Shore of Long Island. It is part of the West Islip Union Free School District.

== Curriculum ==
The curriculum at West Islip High School includes all academic areas, as well as art, business, music, and technology. Beginning in Grade 7, a sequential honors program is offered in English, social studies, mathematics, science, and world languages. Advanced Placement courses are offered in English Language and Composition, English Literature and Composition, US History, European History, Macroeconomics, Microeconomics, US Government and Politics, Calculus AB and Calculus BC, Statistics, Biology, Chemistry, Physics 1 and Physics 2, Environmental Studies, Computer Science, Studio in Art, as well as Italian and Spanish Languages. College courses in business, social studies, English, child development, and world languages are offered by arrangement with Adelphi University, Dowling College, Long Island University and Syracuse University. Beginning September 2010, the high school also offers the International Baccalaureate (IB) Diploma Program. In 2020 the high school was awarded the title of National Blue Ribbon School for its excellence in academics.

== Athletics ==
The West Islip High School boys lacrosse team has won the NYSPHSAA Boys Lacrosse Championship in 2006, 2007, 2009, 2010, and 2012.

The West Islip High School girls lacrosse team won the NYSPHSAA Girls Lacrosse Championship in 2015.

The West Islip High School girls soccer team won the NYSPHSAA Girls Soccer Championship in 1989.

== Arts ==
The high school offers various musical & theatre groups. Students can join or audition for multiple instrumental groups, include marching band, jazz band, orchestra, and others. The school's highest level of orchestras is the Chamber Ensemble, a highly selective string orchestra that requires a video audition. Choir groups include chorus, select chorus, cantante, and the school's select show choir, Vocal Motion. Some of the instrument and vocal groups require auditions. The school's theatre department produces annual plays, one-act plays and a senior play.

== Notable alumni ==
- Matt Anderson, NHL player
- A. J. Benza, gossip columnist and television host
- Sal Caccavale, soccer player and coach
- Thomas Downey, member of the U.S. House of Representatives
- Jarett Gandolfo, Member of the New York State Assembly
- Sean Henry, NHL administrator
- Rick Lazio, member of the U.S. House of Representatives
- Al Oerter, Olympic discus throw champion
- Doug Seegers, country musician
- Kris Statlander, AEW Pro Wrestler
- Gary Sullivan, soccer player
- Ken Marino, actor, comedian, director, and screenwriter
- Nick Tropeano, MLB pitcher
- Bob Wenzel, basketball coach and broadcaster

== Community ==
West Islip High School services all of West Islip and parts of Bay Shore. The hamlet, West Islip, is part of the Town of Islip in Suffolk County.
