= Sean Henry =

Sean Henry may refer to:

- Sean Henry (administrator) (born 1968), ice hockey administrator
- Sean Henry (artist) (born 1965), sculptor
- Sean Henry (musician), American musician
- Seán Henry (rugby union) (born 1987), rugby union player
