= Nolan Ryan =

American baseball player (born 1947)

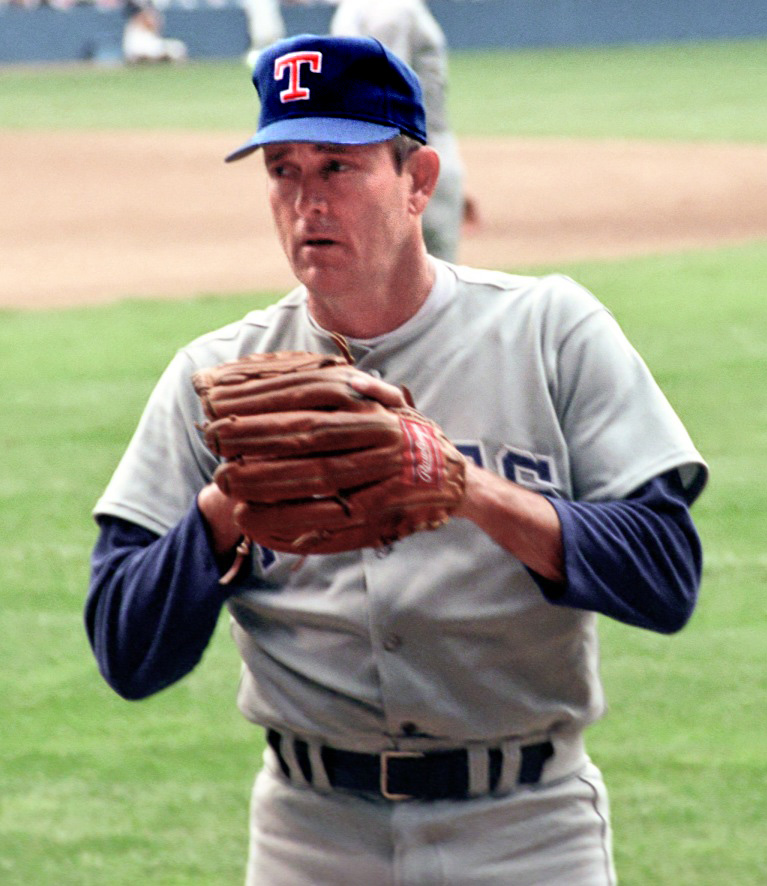
- Ryan with the Texas Rangers in 1990
- Pitcher
- Born: January 31, 1947 (age 79); Refugio, Texas, U.S.
- Batted: Right Threw: Right

MLB debut
- September 11, 1966, for the New York Mets

Last MLB appearance
- September 22, 1993, for the Texas Rangers

MLB statistics
- Win–loss record: 324–292
- Earned run average: 3.19
- Strikeouts: 5,714
- Stats at Baseball Reference

Teams
- New York Mets (1966, 1968–1971); California Angels (1972–1979); Houston Astros (1980–1988); Texas Rangers (1989–1993)

Career highlights and awards
- 8× All-Star (1972, 1973, 1975, 1977, 1979, 1981, 1985, 1989); World Series champion (1969); 2× NL ERA leader (1981, 1987); 11× Strikeout leader (1972–1974, 1976–1979, 1987–1990); Los Angeles Angels No. 30 retired; Houston Astros No. 34 retired; Texas Rangers No. 34 retired; Angels Hall of Fame; Houston Astros Hall of Fame; Texas Rangers Hall of Fame; Major League Baseball All-Century Team; MLB records: 5,714 career strikeouts; 7 career no-hitters

Member of the National

Baseball Hall of Fame
- Induction: 1999
- Vote: 98.8% (first ballot)

Lynn Nolan Ryan Jr. (born January 31, 1947), nicknamed "the Ryan Express", is an American former professional baseball pitcher and sports executive. Over a record 27-year playing career in Major League Baseball (MLB), Ryan pitched for the New York Mets, California Angels, Houston Astros, and Texas Rangers. After his retirement in 1993, Ryan was chief executive officer (CEO) of the Texas Rangers and an executive advisor to the Houston Astros. He was inducted into the Baseball Hall of Fame in 1999 in his first year of eligibility, and is widely considered to be one of the greatest pitchers of all time.

Ryan was a right-handed power pitcher who consistently threw pitches that were clocked above 100 miles per hour (161 km/h), being one of the first pitchers to officially be able to do so. He maintained this velocity throughout his pitching career, being known as one of the top pitchers in Major League Baseball into his mid-40s. Ryan was also known to throw a devastating 12–6 curveball at exceptional velocity for a breaking ball.

Ryan had a lifetime win–loss record of 324–292 (.526) and was an eight-time All-Star. He has 5,714 career strikeouts, an MLB record that is 839 more than runner-up Randy Johnson. Similarly, Ryan's 2,795 bases on balls lead second-place Steve Carlton by 962 – walking over 50% more hitters than any other pitcher in MLB history. Ryan's lifetime batting average against of .204 is also a major league record. He recorded 300 strikeouts in a season six different times, a Major League record, and 200 strikeouts in a season 15 times, also a Major League record. Ryan, Pedro Martínez, Johnson, Trevor Hoffman, Sandy Koufax, and Billy Wagner are the six pitchers inducted into the Baseball Hall of Fame who had more strikeouts than innings pitched. Ryan is one of three players in history to have his number retired by at least three teams, along with Jackie Robinson (whose number was retired by Major League Baseball) and Frank Robinson.

Ryan is the all-time leader in no-hitters with seven, three more than any other pitcher. He is tied with Bob Feller for the most one-hitters, with 12. Ryan also pitched 18 two-hitters. Despite this, he never pitched a perfect game, nor did he ever win a Cy Young Award; both were largely attributed to his high walk rate. Ryan is one of 31 players in baseball history to have appeared in MLB games in four different decades, and retired over 7 years later than the next longest-tenured player of the 1965 Major League Baseball draft, Tom Seaver.

== Early life ==
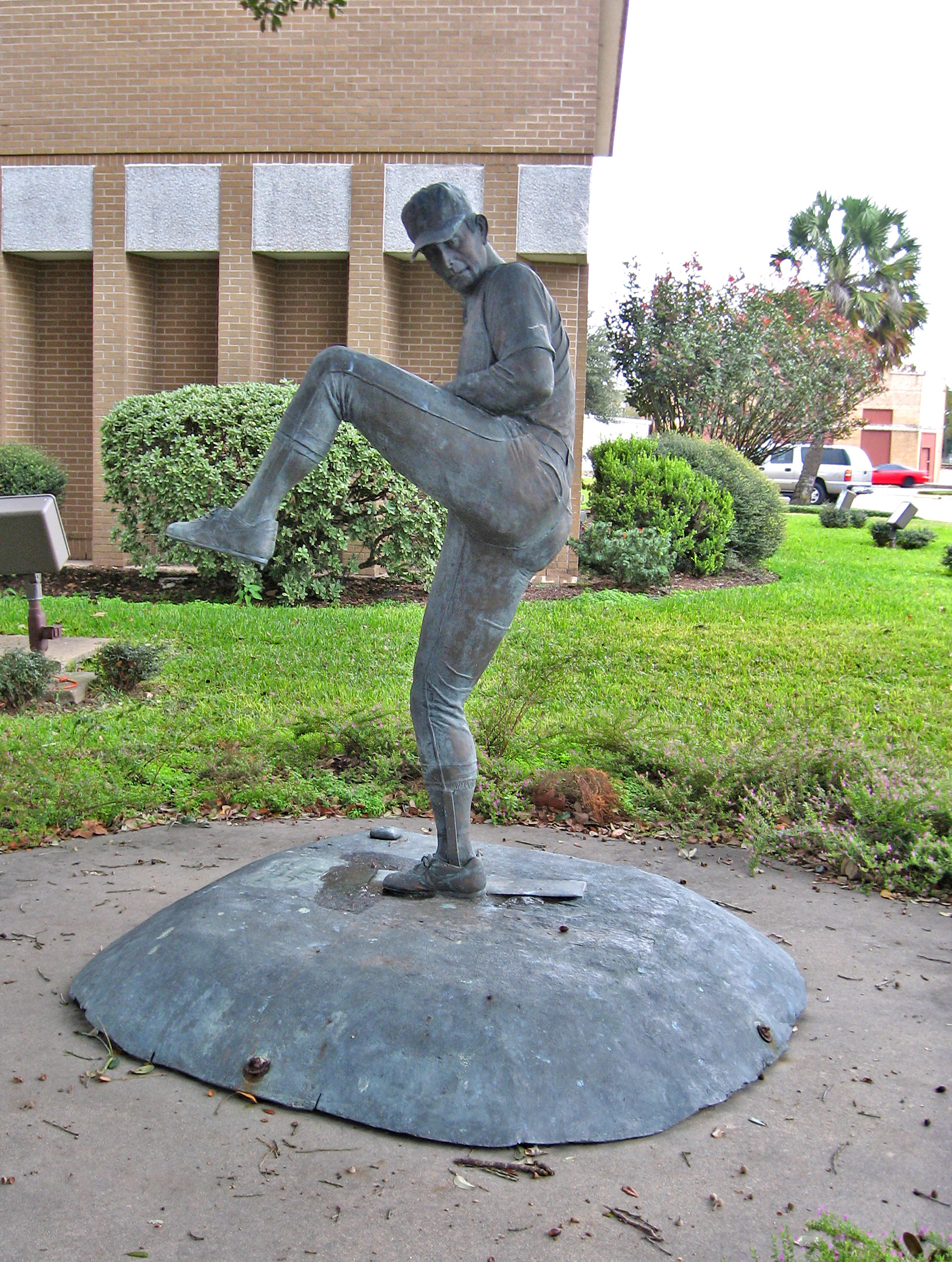
Nolan Ryan Statue – Alvin, Texas

Lynn Nolan Ryan Jr. was born on January 31, 1947, in Refugio, Texas, a small town located just south of Victoria in the southern part of the state. Ryan was the youngest of six children born to Martha Lee (née Hancock; 1913–1990) and Lynn Nolan Ryan Sr. (1907–1970). The senior Ryan operated a newspaper delivery service for the Houston Post that required him to rise in the early morning hours to prepare 1,500 newspapers for delivery over a 55-mile (89 km) route. The children were expected to help with the daily tasks. Ryan's family lived in nearby Woodsboro, Texas, in Refugio County, until they moved to Alvin, Texas, in Brazoria County, when Nolan was six weeks old. As a young boy, Nolan enjoyed throwing objects at any target. His father thought baseball was a better usage for his arm; therefore, he encouraged Nolan to play the game.

Ryan joined Alvin Little League Baseball when he was nine, made the all-star team when he was 11 and 12, and pitched the first no-hitter of his life a few years later. Ryan also played various positions besides pitcher. In junior high school, Ryan could throw a softball over 100 yards. After ninth grade, Ryan quit playing football after a tackle and fumble caused by future NFL running back Norm Bulaich made him decide to focus on baseball.

Ryan played baseball for Coach Jim Watson at Alvin High School for all of his high school career. Ryan held the school's single game strikeout record for 44 years, striking out 21 hitters in a seven-inning game. The record was tied by Alvin High School pitchers Aaron Stewart and Josh Land in the same week in 2009. In 1963, at an Alvin High School game at Clear Creek High School in League City, Texas, Red Murff, a scout for the New York Mets, first noticed sophomore pitcher Ryan. Coach Watson recounted to Murff that some opponents refused to bat against Ryan and how his hard pitches would sometimes break bones in his catchers' hands. In his subsequent report to the Mets, Murff stated that Ryan had "the best arm I've seen in my life." As a senior in 1965, Ryan had a 19–3 record and led the Alvin Yellow Jackets to the Texas high school state finals. Ryan pitched in 27 games, with 20 starts. He had 12 complete games, with 211 strikeouts and 61 walks.

== Professional career ==
=== Draft and minor leagues ===
After he graduated from Alvin, the New York Mets selected Ryan in the 12th round, with the 295th overall pick, of the 1965 Major League Baseball draft. Ryan signed with the Mets and pitched for the Marion Mets in the Appalachian League and for the Mets team in the Florida Instructional League. Overall, he was 6–9 in 1965 with a 4.33 earned run average (ERA) and 150 strikeouts in 120 innings. In 1966, Ryan pitched for the Class A Greenville Mets of the Western Carolinas League, where he went 17–2 with a 2.51 ERA and 272 strikeouts in 183 innings. He was then promoted to the Class AA Williamsport Mets of the Eastern League, where he was 0–2 with a 0.95 ERA, striking out 35 batters in 19 innings. Overall, Ryan had 307 strikeouts in 202 minor league innings in 1966, earning a late-season call-up to the New York Mets. In 1967, Ryan pitched three games in relief for the Class AAA Jacksonville Suns, started one game for the Class A Winter Haven Mets and pitched eight games for the Mets team in the Florida Instructional League. In 34 total innings, Ryan had 54 strikeouts in 1967.

=== New York Mets (1966, 1968–1971) ===
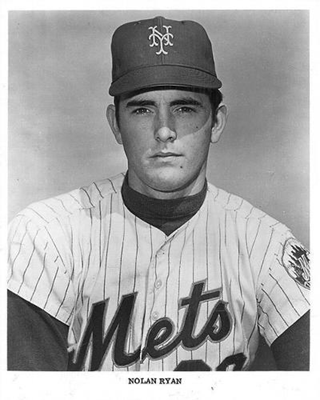
1969 photo of Ryan with the New York Mets

When Ryan was called up by the New York Mets in 1966, he was the second-youngest player in the league. Playing in two games, his first strikeout was Pat Jarvis, and he gave up his first major league home run to Joe Torre.

Ryan missed much of the 1967 season due to illness, an arm injury, and service with the Army Reserve; he pitched only seven innings for the Mets' minor league affiliate in Jacksonville. In the 1968 season, Ryan returned to the major leagues, where he stayed until his retirement in 1993. Ryan was unable to crack into the Mets' pitching rotation, led by Tom Seaver and Jerry Koosman. Ryan was used as a reliever and spot starter by the 1969 Mets. Ryan had frequent blisters on his throwing hand and tried several remedies including dipping his fingers in pickle brine.

Against the Atlanta Braves in the National League Championship Series (NLCS), Ryan completed a Mets sweep by throwing seven innings of relief in Game 3, getting his first playoff win (it took him 12 years to get another). Then in the 1969 World Series, Ryan saved Game 3, pitching 2 1/3 shutout innings against the Baltimore Orioles. The Game 3 victory gave the Mets a 2–1 lead in the Series, which they went on to win in five games. It was Ryan's only World Series appearance in his career.

On April 18, 1970, Ryan tied a Mets record by striking out 15 batters in one game. Four days later, Ryan's teammate Seaver topped it with a then-MLB record 19 against the San Diego Padres (Ryan tied this record four years later). Ryan has credited his time with Seaver and the Mets with turning him from just a flamethrower into a pitcher.

Ryan's performance declined sharply in the second half of his final season with the Mets. His ERA for the first half of the 1971 season was 2.24; in the second half, it was 7.74. As of 2021, this was the steepest second half increase in ERA for a starting pitcher in MLB history.

In five seasons with the Mets, 105 games and 74 starts, Ryan had a 29–38 record, with a 3.58 ERA, 1.39 WHIP, with 344 walks and 493 strikeouts in 511 innings.

=== California Angels (1972–1979) ===
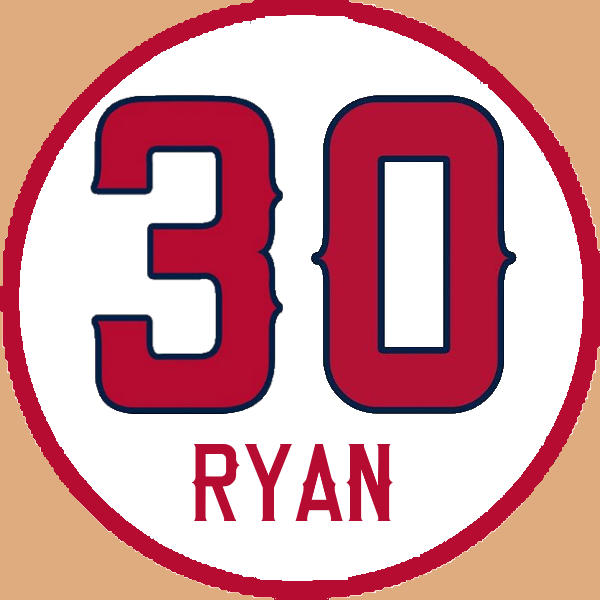
Nolan Ryan's number 30 was retired by the California Angels in 1992.

On December 10, 1971, the 24-year-old Ryan was traded to the California Angels along with pitcher Don Rose, catcher Francisco Estrada, and outfielder Leroy Stanton for shortstop Jim Fregosi (who later managed Ryan in Anaheim). The deal has been cited as one of the worst in Mets history, but was not viewed as unreasonable at the time given Ryan's relatively unremarkable numbers as a Met and Fregosi's good career to that point.

In his first season with the Angels, Ryan was given a chance to pitch regularly as a starter for the first time in his career, mainly because by then he had fulfilled his military obligation and no longer had to commute to Houston every other week. He had a league-leading 329 strikeouts—nearly a third more than the AL runner-up, and the fourth-highest total of the 20th century to that point. Within five seasons, the season was only Ryan's fourth-highest strikeout total. He also set a still-standing Major League record by allowing 5.26 hits per nine innings, breaking Luis Tiant's 5.30 in 1968, as well as posting a 2.28 earned run average that year, to date the second-lowest in franchise history, trailing only Dean Chance's 1.65 in 1964. Though Ryan's actual winning percentage hovered only slightly over .500, his strikeouts and no-hitters brought him media attention. Meanwhile, Fregosi failed to produce as a Met, making no significant contribution to the Mets' 1973 pennant-winning campaign; he was sold to the Texas Rangers mid-season.

Although the Angels were a sub-.500 team and remained one for much of Ryan's time with them, he managed to post some winning records, notably 19–16 in 1972, 21–16 in 1973, and 22–16 in 1974 (the 22 wins tied what remains the Angels franchise record, set by Clyde Wright in 1970). He finished second in the Cy Young Award balloting (losing to Jim Palmer 88–62) in 1973. It was the closest he ever came to winning the award. Ryan also led the league in losses in 1976 with a 17–18 record (one short of the franchise record for losses). In the early 1970s, many teams used a four-man rotation and expected the starter to complete the game; thus most of the games Ryan started ended in a decision.

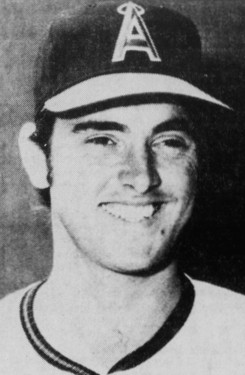
Ryan, circa 1972

On July 9, 1972, Ryan struck out three batters on nine pitches in the second inning of a 3–0 win over the Boston Red Sox; he became the seventh American League pitcher to accomplish the immaculate inning, and the first pitcher in Major League history to accomplish the feat in both leagues (on April 19, 1968, he had struck out three batters on nine pitches in the second inning of a 2–1 win over the St. Louis Cardinals, becoming the eighth National League pitcher and the 14th pitcher in Major League history to accomplish the feat).

Ryan threw a no-hitter against the Kansas City Royals on May 15, 1973. He threw a second no-hitter on July 15 against the Detroit Tigers, he struck out 17 batters – the most in a recorded no-hitter. (This record was later tied by Max Scherzer on October 3, 2015.) Ryan was so dominant in this game, it led to one of baseball's best-remembered pranks. Tigers first baseman and cleanup hitter Norm Cash came to the plate with two outs in the bottom of the ninth, having already struck out twice, and was carrying a clubhouse table leg instead of a bat. Plate umpire Ron Luciano ordered Cash to go back and get a regulation bat, to which Cash replied, "Why? I won't hit him anyway!" With a regulation bat in hand, Cash did finally make contact, but popped out to end the game. Cash's teammate Mickey Stanley commented on facing Ryan that day by saying, "Those were the best pitches I ever heard."

In 1973, Ryan set his first major record when he struck out 383 batters in one season, beating Sandy Koufax's old mark by one. Remarking on this feat, Koufax joked, "Yeah, and he also surpassed my total for bases on balls in a single season by 91. I suspect half of those guys he struck out swung rather than get hit." Ryan finished second in balloting for the Cy Young Award, behind Jim Palmer.

Pitching 13 innings against the Boston Red Sox on June 14, 1974, Ryan threw 235 pitches, striking out 19, walking 10 and getting a no-decision.

During a September 7, 1974, game against the Chicago White Sox at Anaheim Stadium, Ryan became the first Major League pitcher to have his pitch speed measured during a game. A primitive radar gun clocked a ninth-inning fastball at 100.8 miles per hour (162.2 km/h) when it was 10 feet (3.0 m) in front of home plate. This exceeded an earlier pitch by Bob Feller which was measured at 98.6 miles per hour (158.7 km/h) at home plate and previously thought to be the fastest pitch ever recorded.

Ryan added a third no-hitter in 1974 and a fourth in 1975, tying another of Koufax's records. In 1974 he twice struck out 19 batters, tying Tom Seaver and Steve Carlton for the single-game record for a nine-inning game. Roger Clemens became the first pitcher with a 20-strikeout game in 1986.

The Angels finally made the playoffs in Ryan's eighth and final year there in 1979. He started Game 1 of the ALCS against the Baltimore Orioles and threw seven innings against the Orioles' Jim Palmer, but neither man was involved in the decision as Baltimore won in the 10th inning. Ryan was scheduled to pitch Game 5, but the Angels were eliminated in four. The season complete, Ryan became a free agent.

Ryan led the American League in strikeouts seven times during his eight seasons with the Angels, but he also led the league in walks in six of those years, and finished second the other two seasons: 1975 and 1979. Aside from Bob Feller in 1938, Ryan is the only man since 1900 to walk 200 batters in a season, which he did twice: in 1974 and 1977. Emblematic of this, his 1974 no-hitter against the Minnesota Twins included eight walks.

Though Ryan's strikeouts and no-hitters got him considerable media attention, he did not persuade Angels general manager Buzzie Bavasi, who dismissed him as a flashy .500 pitcher (Ryan was 26–27 in the last two years he was with the Angels).

In his eight seasons with the Angels, Ryan was 138–121, a 3.07 ERA, 1.29 WHIP, with 1,302 walks and 2,416 strikeouts in 2181 innings over 288 starts and 156 complete games.

=== Houston Astros (1980–1988) ===
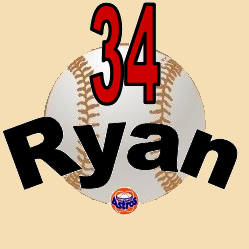
Nolan Ryan's number 34 was retired by the Houston Astros in 1996.

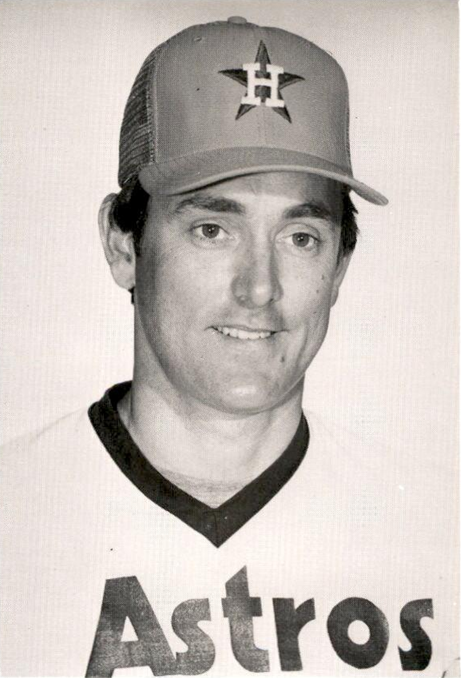
1982 postcard of Ryan for Houston Astros

On November 19, 1979, Ryan signed a four-year contract worth $4.5 million (equivalent to $20 million in 2025) with the Houston Astros, becoming MLB's first million-dollar player. The salary quadrupled what he had been making with the California Angels. It was with the Astros that Ryan who had previously wore #30 (which was already taken by teammate Jeffrey Leonard), switched to his more familiar #34 (Ryan had previously worn the number for two games in 1966 as a Met), a number he would wear for the rest of his career. In a nationally televised game against the Los Angeles Dodgers on April 12, 1980, Ryan hit a three-run home run off Don Sutton. It was the first of two homers in Ryan's career and produced half of the six RBIs he got that year. On July 4 at Riverfront Stadium, Ryan recorded his 3,000th career strikeout, the victim being César Gerónimo of the Cincinnati Reds. The Astros made the 1980 MLB postseason. In the 1980 NLCS versus the Philadelphia Phillies, Ryan pitched well in Game 2, leaving the game tied 2–2 in the seventh (having contributed to both Astros runs with a run scored following a walk, and a sacrifice bunt leading to a run) but again got a no-decision in a game that went extra innings. In the fifth and final game of the series, Ryan and the Astros held a 5–2 lead entering the 8th inning. But Ryan allowed three consecutive singles before walking in the third run. The Houston bullpen allowed the Phillies to take a 7–5 lead, and only a game-tying Astro rally permitted Ryan to escape the loss.

On September 26, 1981, Ryan threw his fifth no-hitter, breaking Koufax's mark while becoming the third pitcher to throw a no-hitter in each league. That season, his 1.69 ERA was the best in the National League.

Facing the Los Angeles Dodgers in the 1981 NLDS, Ryan threw a complete game two-hitter in the opener, outlasting the Dodgers' rookie sensation Fernando Valenzuela. It was Ryan's second and last career postseason win. In the fifth and final game of the series, Ryan left trailing 3–0 and took the loss.

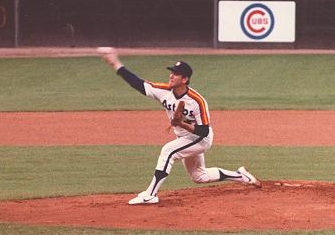
Ryan pitching for the Astros in 1983

By the end of the 1982 season, both Ryan and Steve Carlton were approaching Walter Johnson's all-time strikeout record, sometimes passing one another's career totals in successive starts. On April 27, 1983, Ryan won the race with his 3,509th whiff, against Brad Mills of the Montreal Expos. (Carlton reached the same mark two weeks after Ryan, and Gaylord Perry did so later that season.) On July 11, 1985, Ryan struck out Danny Heep for his 4,000th career strikeout.

In 1986, Ryan's Astros faced the New York Mets in the National League Championship Series. Ryan had a shaky start in Game 2, taking the loss. He returned in Game 5, throwing 9 innings of 2-hit, 1-run, 12-strikeout ball, but one of those hits was a Darryl Strawberry home run that tied the game at 1, as Dwight Gooden matched Ryan pitch for pitch. Ryan got a no-decision as his Astros lost in 12 innings.

In 1987, Ryan led the major leagues in both ERA (2.76) and strikeouts (270) at the age of 40, but finished 8–16 as the result of extremely poor run support; the Astros scored a total of 27 runs in his 16 losses–an average of 1.69 runs per game. Despite his .333 winning percentage, Ryan tied for 5th place in the 1987 Cy Young voting. Ryan hit his second and final career home run in a 12–3 win on May 1, 1987, against the Atlanta Braves.

In nine seasons as a pitcher with the Astros (his longest tenure with any team), Ryan compiled a 106–94 record in 282 starts, a 3.13 ERA, 1.20 WHIP, with 796 walks and 1,866 strikeouts in 1,854 innings.

=== Texas Rangers (1989–1993) ===
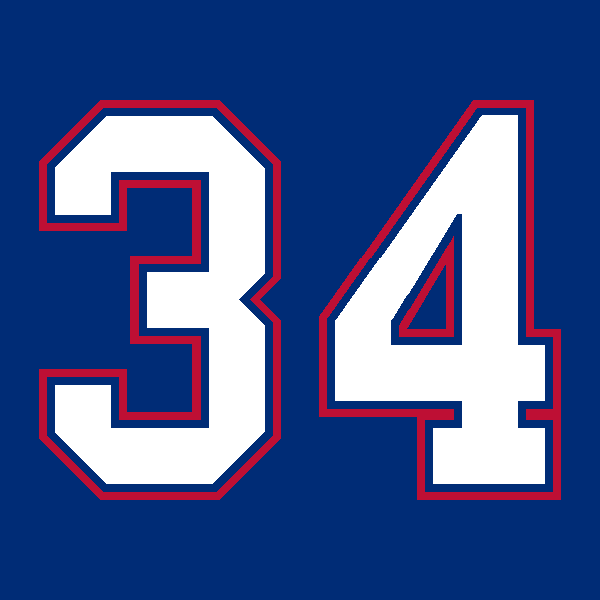
Nolan Ryan's number 34 was retired by the Texas Rangers in 1996.

Ryan left Houston after a contract dispute following the 1988 season and signed with the Texas Rangers at age 42. He became the first player to play for all four MLB original expansion teams: the Mets, Angels, Houston Colt .45s/ Astros and Washington Senators/Texas Rangers. (Ryan was joined in this category by Darren Oliver, who made his major league debut as Ryan's teammate in September 1993. Oliver's father Bob had also been a teammate of Ryan's, with the Angels from 1972 to 1974.) In 1989, he went 16–10 and led the league with 301 strikeouts. Against the Oakland Athletics on August 22, Ryan struck out Rickey Henderson, becoming the only pitcher to record 5,000 career strikeouts. Following the game, Henderson was quoted as saying, "If he ain't struck you out, then you ain't nobody." His 4,999th and 5,001st strikeouts were against the same man, Athletics catcher Ron Hassey. Two years later, at 44, Ryan finished fifth in the league in ERA (2.91) and third in strikeouts (203).

In 1990, Ryan threw his sixth no-hitter on June 11 against the Athletics, and earned his 300th win on July 31 against the Milwaukee Brewers, and was named The Sporting News Sportsman of the Year. On May 1, 1991, at age 44, Ryan extended his record by throwing the seventh no-hitter of his career, striking out Roberto Alomar of the Toronto Blue Jays for the final out. On August 6, 1992, Ryan had the only ejection of his career after engaging in a shouting match with Oakland Athletics outfielder Willie Wilson with two outs in the eighth inning.

Before the 1993 season began, Ryan announced that he would retire as a player at the end of that season. On August 4, Ryan hit Robin Ventura of the Chicago White Sox with a pitch, and Ventura charged the mound in order to fight Ryan, who was 20 years his senior. Ryan secured the 26-year-old Ventura in a headlock with his left arm, while pummeling Ventura's head with his right fist six times before catcher Iván Rodríguez was able to pull Ventura away from Ryan. Ryan stated afterwards that it was the same maneuver he used on steers he had to brand on his Texas ranch. Videos of the incident were played that evening throughout the country. While Ventura was ejected, Ryan–who had barely moved from his spot on the mound in the fracas–was allowed to remain in the game. White Sox manager Gene Lamont vehemently argued this, leading to his own ejection. Ryan pitched a hitless game the rest of the way. He had been determined to be more aggressive after coming out on the wrong side of an altercation with Dave Winfield in 1980.

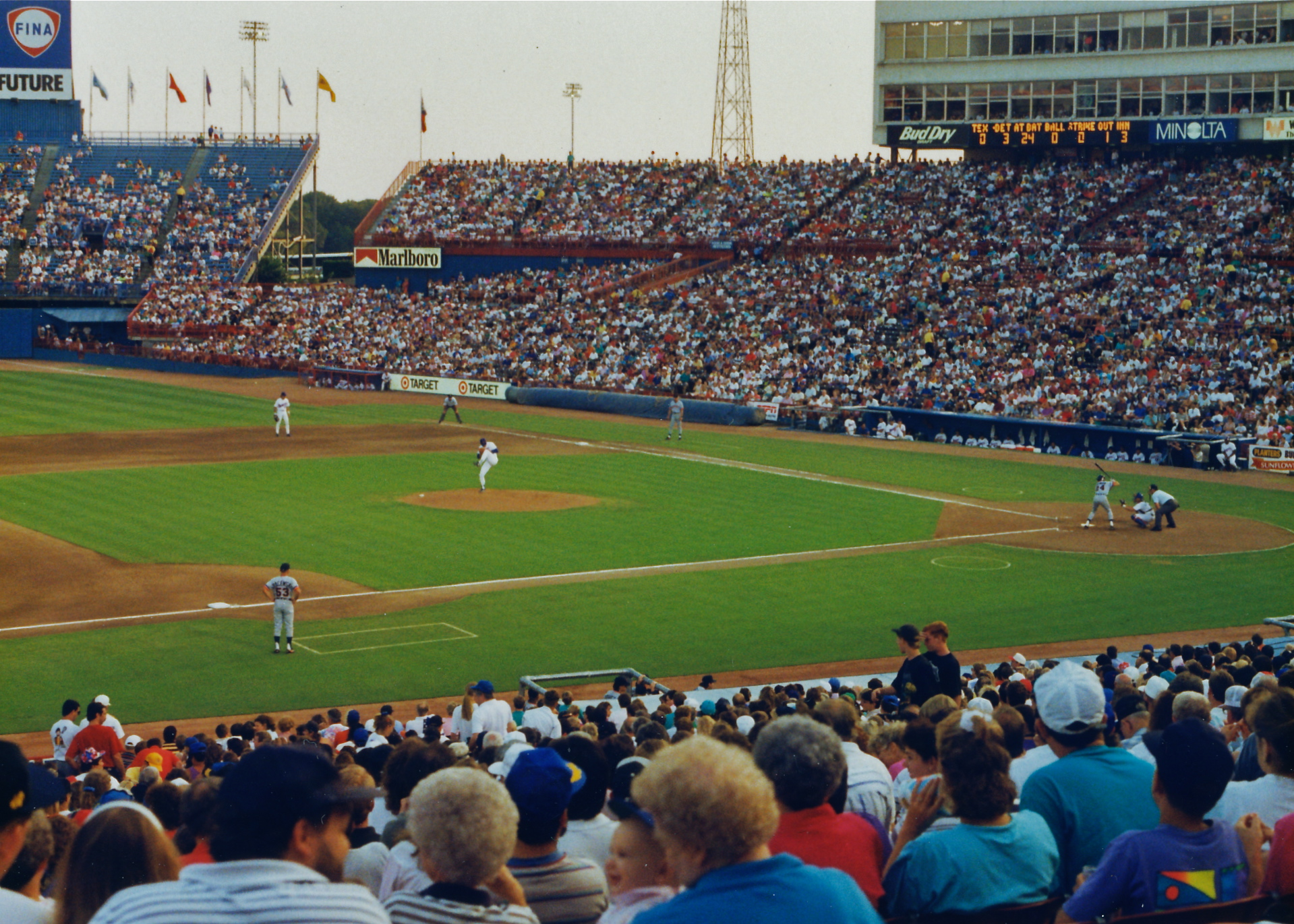
Ryan on the mound during a 1992 home game at Arlington Stadium

Ryan tore a ligament in his pitching arm in Seattle on September 22, 1993. The injury ended his career two starts earlier than planned, at age 46. Ryan briefly attempted to pitch past the injury, and he threw one additional pitch after tearing his ligament. Ryan's last start was his career-worst; he allowed a single, four walks, and a grand slam in the bottom of the first without recording an out. It was his record-setting 10th grand slam given up of his career. Ryan left trailing 5–0, and was eventually charged with the loss in a 7–4 defeat; Ryan's fourth walk was completed after his injury by reliever Steve Dreyer, but charged to Ryan. Greg Myers of the California Angels was the last strikeout victim of Nolan Ryan's career, on September 17, 1993.

Ryan finished his career having played in the major leagues a record of 27 seasons. He was the final active player from the 1960s to retire from Major League Baseball, outlasting Carlton Fisk (the final active position player) by three months.

In five seasons with the Rangers, Ryan had a 51–39 record, a 3.43 ERA, 1.12 WHIP, with 353 walks and 939 strikeouts in 840 innings over 129 starts.

=== Career statistics ===
W	L	PCT	ERA	G	GS	CG	SHO	SV	IP	H	ER	R	HR	BB	SO	WP	HBP
324	292	.526	3.19	807	773	222	61	3	5386.0	3923	1911	2178	321	2795	5714	277	158

=== Seven no-hitters ===
Ryan threw a record seven no-hitters during his major league career, three more than any other pitcher. The no-hitters spanned three decades of pitching. In those seven games, Ryan accumulated a total of 94 strikeouts and 26 walks; a ratio of 3.6 strikeouts per walk (his career K:BB was 2.0). Ryan struck out 17 in his no-hitter on July 15, 1973, versus Detroit and walked eight in his subsequent no-hitter against Minnesota, both respective highs for his no-hitters.

Date	Result	Venue	Attendance	Time	Catcher	Home plate umpire	Box score
May 15, 1973	California Angels 3 at Kansas City Royals 0	Royals Stadium	12,205	2:20	Jeff Torborg	Jim Evans	
July 15, 1973	California Angels 6 at Detroit Tigers 0	Tiger Stadium	41,411	2:21	Art Kusnyer	Ron Luciano	
September 28, 1974	Minnesota Twins 0 at California Angels 4	Anaheim Stadium	10,872	2:22	Tom Egan	Art Frantz	
June 1, 1975	Baltimore Orioles 0 at California Angels 1	Anaheim Stadium	18,492	2:01	Ellie Rodríguez	Hank Morgenweck	
September 26, 1981	Los Angeles Dodgers 0 at Houston Astros 5	Astrodome	32,115	2:46	Alan Ashby	Bruce Froemming	
June 11, 1990	Texas Rangers 5 at Oakland Athletics 0	Oakland–Alameda County Coliseum	33,436	2:49	John Russell	Don Denkinger	
May 1, 1991	Toronto Blue Jays 0 at Texas Rangers 3	Arlington Stadium	33,439	2:25	Mike Stanley	Tim Tschida	

== MLB records ==
Ryan holds 51 total MLB records, including:

- 5,714 career strikeouts (next-most is Randy Johnson with 4,875)
- 7 career no-hitters (next-most is Sandy Koufax with 4)
- Lowest career batting average allowed (minimum 1,500 innings pitched): .204
- 12 career 1-hitters, tied with Bob Feller
- 18 career 2-hitters
- 31 career 3-hitters
- 15 200-strikeout seasons
- 6 300-strikeout seasons
- 4 career 19+ strikeout games
- 5 career 18+ strikeout games
- 8 career 17+ strikeout games
- 16 career 16+ strikeout games
- 26 career 15+ strikeout games by a right-handed pitcher
- 36 career 14+ strikeout games by a right-handed pitcher
- 56 career 13+ strikeout games by a right-handed pitcher
- 95 career 12+ strikeout games by a right-handed pitcher
- 151 career 11+ strikeout games by a right-handed pitcher
- 215 career 10+ strikeout games
- 282 career 9+ strikeout games
- 358 career 8+ strikeout games
- 447 career 7+ strikeout games
- 517 career 6+ strikeout games
- 596 career 5+ strikeout games
- 654 career 4+ strikeout games
- 710 career 3+ strikeout games
- 752 career 2+ strikeouts games
- 3 19+ strikeout games, single season (1974)
- 3 18+ strikeout games, single season (1974)
- 3 17+ strikeout games, single season (1974)
- 3 16+ strikeout games by a right-handed pitcher, single season (1972, 1974)
- 6 15+ strikeout games, single season (1974 - tied with Pedro Martinez)
- 15 12+ strikeout games, single season (1973)
- 18 11+ strikeout games by a right-handed pitcher, single season (1973)
- 23 10+ strikeout games, single season (1973 - tied with Randy Johnson)
- 26 9+ strikeout games, single season (1973)
- 29 8+ strikeout games by a right-handed pitcher, single season (1973)
- 32 7+ strikeout games by a right-handed pitcher, single season (1973)
- 36 6+ strikeout games, single season (1974 - tied with Sandy Koufax)
- 6.55 hits per nine innings pitched, career, minimum 1,000 innings (next-fewest is Sandy Koufax at 6.79)
- 5.26 single-season hits per nine innings (1972)
- 26 seasons with at least one win
- Most strikeouts by a pitcher over the age of 40 (1,167)

== Later activity ==
Nolan Ryan's post-retirement business interests include being the principal owner of Ryan Sanders Sports and Entertainment, which is the ownership group for the Round Rock Express, the Triple-A affiliate of the Texas Rangers. When the Texas Rangers moved to The Ballpark in Arlington during the 1994 season, he threw the ceremonial first pitch for an exhibition game between the Rangers and the New York Mets for the stadium's soft opening day on April 1, 1994.

From 1994 to 1997, Ryan became a volunteer pitching coach for the TCU Horned Frogs whilst his two sons, Reid and Reese, played for them while they were enrolled at Texas Christian University.

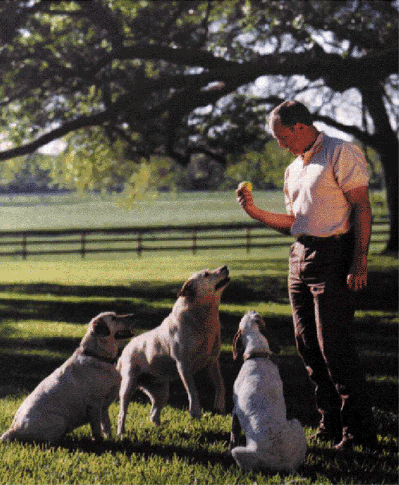
Ryan playing with some dogs

Ryan threw out the ceremonial first pitch before Game 3 of the 2005 World Series between the Astros and the White Sox, the first World Series game played in Texas. That game went 14 innings, equaling the longest in innings in World Series history (at 5 hours and 41 minutes, it was the longest in time). ESPN suggested the Astros might have needed to pull the 58-year-old Ryan out of retirement if the game had gone much longer.

Ryan has co-written six books: autobiographies Miracle Man (with Jerry Jenkins, 1992), Throwing Heat (with Harvey Frommer, 1988) and The Road to Cooperstown (with Mickey Herskowitz and T.R. Sullivan, 1999); Kings of the Hill (with Mickey Herskowitz, 1992), about contemporary pitchers; and instructional books Pitching and Hitting (with Joe Torre and Joel Cohen, 1977), and Nolan Ryan's Pitcher's Bible (with Tom House, 1991).

In addition to his baseball activities, Ryan was majority owner and chairman of Express Bank of Alvin but sold his interest in 2005. He also owned a restaurant in Three Rivers, Texas. He served on the Texas Parks and Wildlife Commission from 1995 to 2001. He appeared as a TV spokesman for Advil for several years. He also has appeared in various television commercials shown in the Texas market.

After retiring from baseball, Ryan teamed up with the federal government to promote physical fitness. His likeness was used in the "Nolan Ryan Fitness Guide", published by The President's Council on Physical Fitness and Sports in 1994.

Ryan suffered a heart attack on April 25, 2000, and had to receive a double coronary bypass.

Ryan owns Nolan Ryan Beef Company, operating out of Round Rock, Texas.

=== Texas Rangers president and CEO (2008–2013) ===
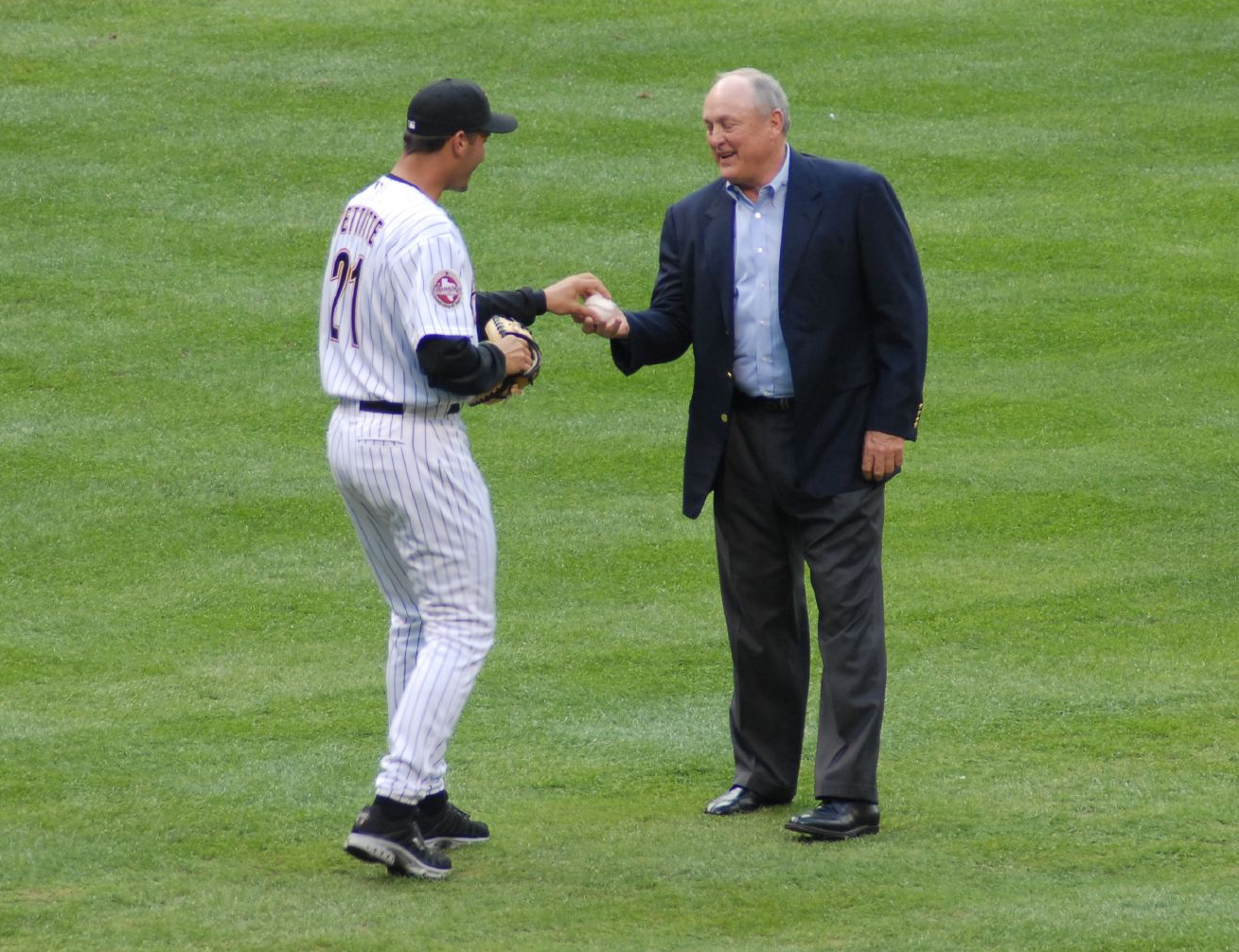
Andy Pettitte and Ryan in 2006

In February 2008, the Rangers hired Ryan as team president. After the 2009 season, Ryan and Chuck Greenberg submitted a bid to purchase the Rangers from owner Tom Hicks. At midnight on August 5, 2010, the Ryan/Greenberg group, Rangers Baseball Express, was announced as the winner of the final auction to purchase the Rangers, after final approval from Major League Baseball. The final cash bid to purchase the franchise was $385 million. The opposing high bidder was Dallas Mavericks owner Mark Cuban. Greenberg became managing general partner and CEO, while Ryan remained as team president.

Greenberg left the group in March 2011, reportedly due to a philosophical clash with Ryan. Ryan was immediately named as CEO while keeping the title of president. Although Texas oil magnates Ray Davis and Bob Simpson served as co-chairmen and held larger stakes, Ryan became the undisputed head of the franchise, with Davis and Simpson serving mostly as senior consultants.

Ryan was named the Dallas–Fort Worth's 2012 CEO of the Year by Southern Methodist University's Cox School of Business.

During the baseball owners' meetings in Scottsdale, Arizona, on March 1, 2013, the Rangers announced that general manager Jon Daniels would add president of baseball operations to his title. Rick George was promoted to president of business operations. Ryan's title was changed simply to CEO, but he remained operating head of the franchise; both Daniels and George reported to him. On October 17, 2013, Ryan announced that he was stepping down as Rangers CEO effective October 31, 2013.

=== Houston Astros special assistant (2014–2019) ===
On February 11, 2014, Ryan accepted a position as an executive adviser for the Houston Astros under owner Jim Crane. Ryan's son, Reid Ryan, was hired the previous year as president of business operations for the Astros. The Astros won the 2017 World Series and won the 2019 American League pennant. Reid Ryan was demoted by the Astros after the 2019 World Series, and shortly thereafter Nolan Ryan sent a text message to a reporter indicating that he would not return to the Astros front office for the 2020 season.

== Legacy ==
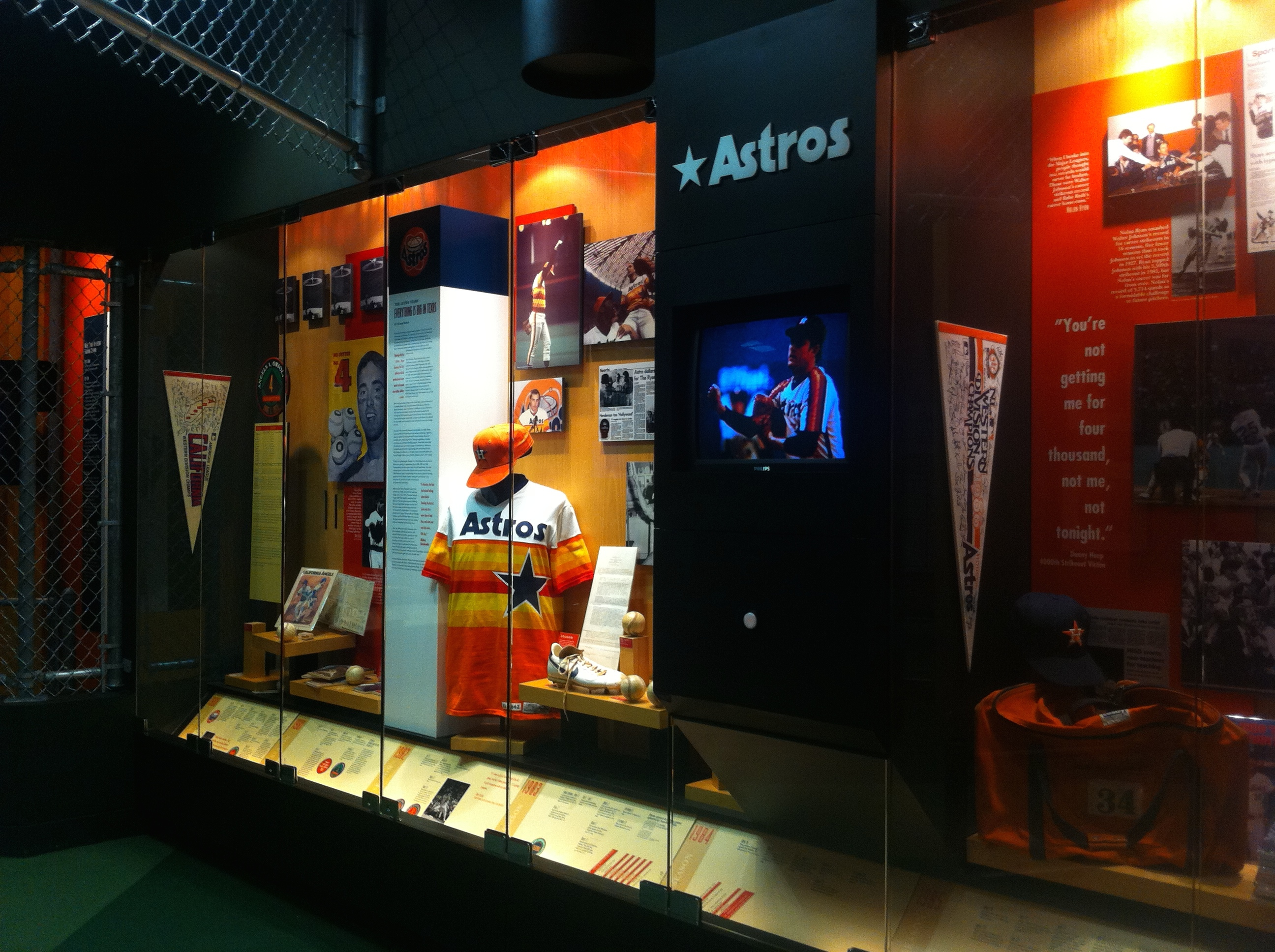
The Nolan Ryan Exhibit Center in Alvin, Texas

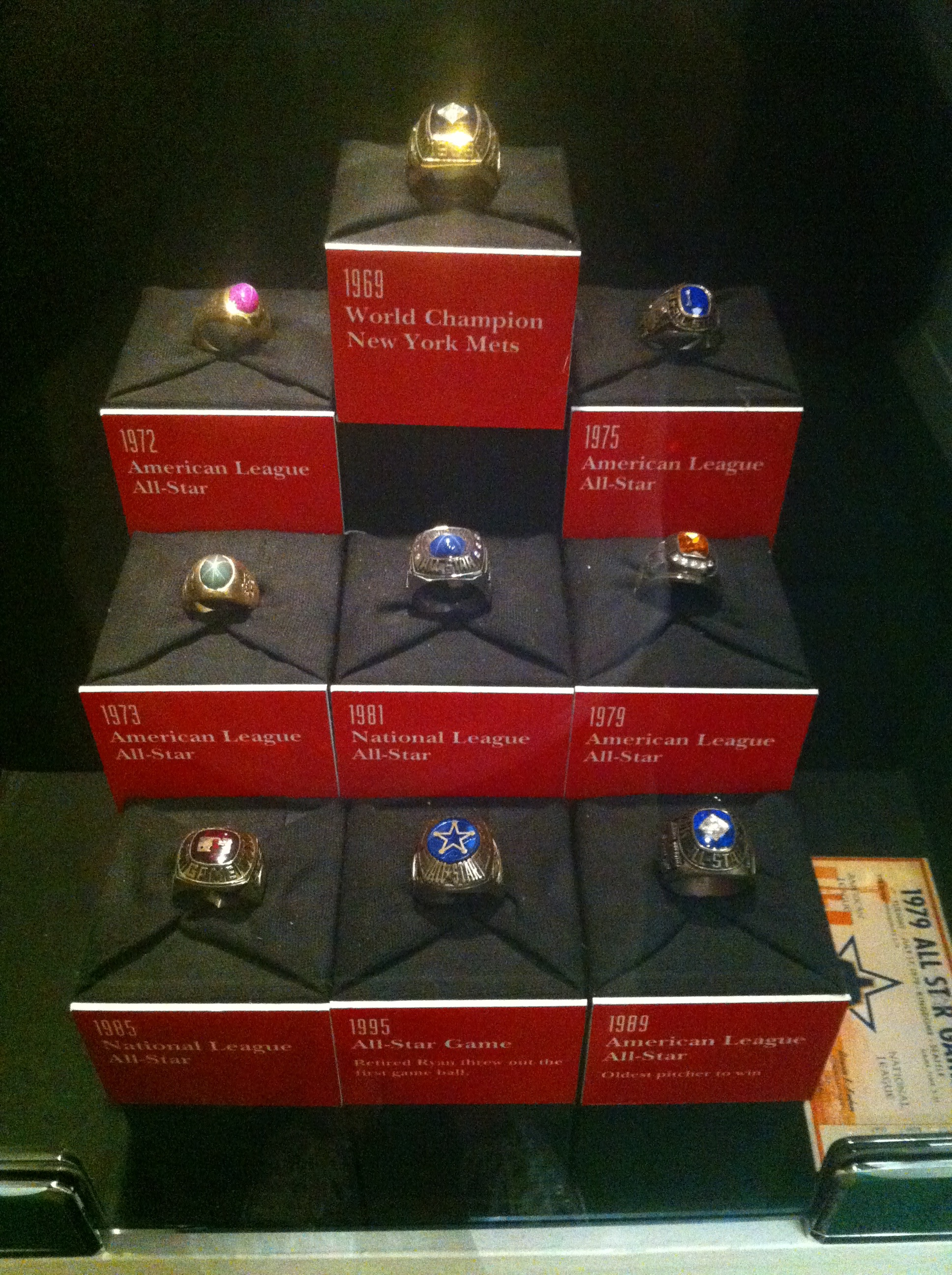
A collection of rings awarded to Nolan Ryan for appearances as an All-Star and as a member of the 1969 New York Mets World Champion team

Ryan played in more seasons (27) than any other major league player since 1900. (He is tied with Cap Anson for the most all time.) Ryan ranks first for all-time in strikeouts (5,714), fewest hits allowed per nine innings (6.56), and no-hitters (7). He is also fifth in innings pitched (5,386), second in games started (773), seventh in shutouts (61), is tied for 14th in wins (324), and is third in losses (292).

Opposing hitters hit .204 against Ryan during his career, although they had a .309 on-base percentage against him. He also limited hitters to a .298 slugging percentage. Ryan had 15 or more strikeouts in a game 26 times, second to Randy Johnson, who had 28. Ryan's lengthy career spanned generations as he struck out seven pairs of fathers and sons (for example, Bobby Bonds and Barry Bonds), another major league record. Ryan also played during the administrations of seven U.S. Presidents—Lyndon B. Johnson, Richard M. Nixon, Gerald Ford, Jimmy Carter, Ronald Reagan, George H. W. Bush, and Bill Clinton—equaling a 20th-century record that had been set by Jim Kaat.

Ryan also ranks high on the list for four "negative" records; he ranks first all-time in walks allowed (2,795), first in wild pitches (277), third in losses (292 – most in the post-1920 live-ball era), and ninth in batters hit (158). Ryan was the first pitcher in MLB history to give up ten grand slam home runs, including one to Dann Howitt, the next-to-last batter Ryan faced in his career; that record has since been surpassed.

Bill James focused on this dichotomy between Ryan's positive and negative statistics. While ranking him as the 24th best pitcher of all time, he noted, "Ryan has been retired almost ten years [as of 2001], in another ten perhaps we will begin to get a little bit of perspective on him. Ryan's log of spectacular accomplishments is as thick as Bill Clinton's little black book; his list of flaws and failures is lengthy but dry, and will never make for good reading."

Other writers have delved more into the specifics of James' general concerns. ESPN writer Rob Neyer stated in a 2003 column that while Ryan was among the 20 best pitchers since World War II, he "often had trouble throwing strikes, [and] he wasn't any good at fielding his position". In another column, Neyer, while stating that Ryan belonged in the Hall of Fame, pointed to Ryan's record-breaking walks total and noted that his .309 on-base percentage against "wasn't even close to being in the top 100".

Ryan and Frank Robinson are the only two major league players to have their number retired by three teams on which they played. The California Angels retired the number 30 on June 16, 1992; the Texas Rangers retired his number 34 on September 15, 1996; and the Houston Astros retired number 34 on September 29, 1996. His number was the first retired by the Rangers.

Ryan was elected to the Baseball Hall of Fame in 1999 in his first year of eligibility with 98.79% of the vote (491 out of 497 possible), six votes short of a unanimous election and the sixth-highest percentage in history, behind Mariano Rivera (100%, 425 out of 425 possible), Derek Jeter (99.75%, 396 out of 397 possible), Ichiro Suzuki (99.75%, 393 out of 394 possible), Ken Griffey Jr. (99.32%, 437 out of 440 possible), and Tom Seaver (98.84%, 425 out of 430 possible). He chose to wear a Rangers cap for his HOF plaque to reflect his Texas heritage, as well as the fact that his 300th win, 5000th strikeout, and last two no-hitters came as a Ranger. He was the first Hall of Famer inducted as a Ranger. However, the Hall of Fame recognizes the Los Angeles Angels as his primary team.

In 1999, he ranked 41st on The Sporting News list of the 100 Greatest Baseball Players and was elected to the Major League Baseball All-Century Team. He was inducted into the Texas Rangers Hall of Fame in 2003, and named the Rangers', and Astros' Hometown Hero in 2006—the only player to be so named by two franchises. In 2020, The Athletic ranked Ryan at number 50 on its "Baseball 100" list, complied by sportswriter Joe Posnanski.

In 2011, he was inducted into the Irish American Baseball Hall of Fame.

In 1992, the United States Mint produced a $1 commemorative coin honoring Olympic baseball depicting a pitcher in a USA Baseball uniform in a pose nearly identical to Ryan's photo on his 1991 Fleer baseball card. The numismatic community subsequently referred to the coin as the "Nolan Ryan dollar".

In 1995 the Texas State Legislature declared State Highway 288, which passes near Alvin, as the Nolan Ryan Expressway.

The Alvin Independent School District opened Nolan Ryan Junior High School, located at 11500 Shadow Creek Parkway (FM 2234) in Pearland, Texas, just a few hundred yards away from the Nolan Ryan Expressway.

The Nolan Ryan Foundation is a Texas nonprofit organization that supports youth, education, and community development and is headquartered in Round Rock, Texas.

The Texas Trail of Fame inducted Ryan in 2009. The Texas Cowboy Hall of Fame inducted Ryan in 2010.

A documentary, Facing Nolan, was released in 2022.

== Personal life ==
Ryan married his high school sweetheart, Ruth Holdorff, on June 26, 1967. Nolan and Ruth attended Alvin High School together. Ruth was a high school state tennis champion. They have three children: Reid, Reese, and Wendy. Reid and Reese were both pitchers for the TCU Horned Frogs. Reid also pitched briefly in the minor leagues. On May 17, 2013, Reid was announced as president of the Houston Astros.

Nolan frequently pitched in the off-seasons, with Ruth often donning catching gear and serving as his catcher. Ruth Ryan also coached their sons' little league teams for a few summers.

Nolan Ryan resides in Georgetown, Texas.

=== Political activity ===
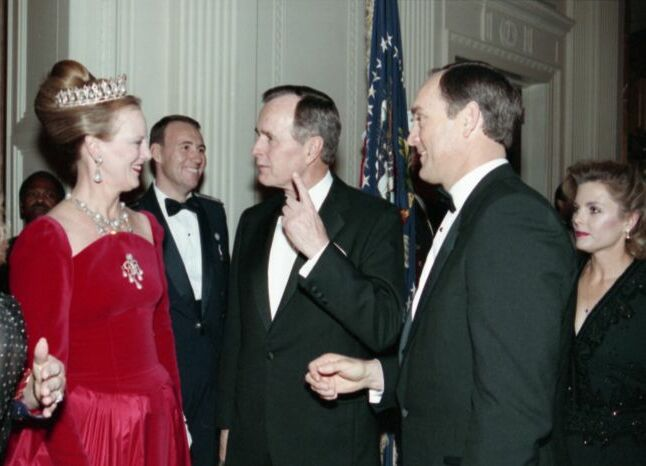
Ryan is introduced to Margrethe II of Denmark by George H. W. Bush in 1991. His wife, Ruth, is at right.

Ryan wrote in his 1992 autobiography Miracle Man that he voted for Jimmy Carter over Gerald Ford in 1976, but since then has generally identified as a Republican, though he does not automatically vote this way and looks at individual candidates, mentioning disgust at one particular election in which the two major parties were forcing a choice between "the racist or the criminal." He also crossed party lines in 2002 to headline a group of Republicans and Independents supporting a Democratic candidate for Lieutenant Governor of Texas. He has maintained a decades-long friendship with the Bush family, partially due to George W. Bush being a part-owner of the Rangers while Ryan played there. However, in his 1992 book Ryan expressed some criticisms of the elder Bush's (George H.W. Bush) management of domestic issues and said he wasn't "locked in" to voting for Bush that fall. In 1996 Ryan campaigned on behalf of Ron Paul in the election for Texas's 14th congressional district; his hometown of Alvin was located in the district.

On April 7, 2011, Todd Staples announced that Nolan Ryan would be his statewide chairman for his exploratory committee for lieutenant governor. Ryan is quoted as saying, "Todd Staples is the top prospect for the Texas Republican Party in 2014." Staples, however, lost that race to current Lieutenant Governor Dan Patrick of Houston.

== See also ==
- Nolan Ryan's Baseball, a 1991 video game
- DHL Hometown Heroes
- Major League Baseball titles leaders
- List of Major League Baseball annual ERA leaders
- List of Major League Baseball annual strikeout leaders
- List of Major League Baseball career wins leaders
- List of Major League Baseball career hit batsmen leaders
- List of Major League Baseball career wild pitches leaders
- List of Major League Baseball career strikeout leaders
- List of Major League Baseball career bases on balls allowed leaders
- List of Major League Baseball no-hitters
- List of Major League Baseball single-game strikeout leaders
- List of Major League Baseball pitchers who have thrown an immaculate inning
- List of Major League Baseball players who played in four decades

Awards and achievements
Preceded by Andy Messersmith	California Angels Opening Day; Starting pitcher 1973–1975	Succeeded by Frank Tanana
Preceded by Joe Niekro; Joe Niekro	Houston Astros Opening Day; Starting pitcher 1982; 1985–1986	Succeeded by Joe Niekro; Mike Scott
Preceded by Charlie Hough	Texas Rangers Opening Day; Starting pitcher 1990–1992	Succeeded by Craig Lefferts
Preceded by Steve Busby; Nolan Ryan; Dick Bosman; Nolan Ryan; Len Barker; Randy Johnson; Dave Stieb	No-hitter pitcher May 15, 1973; July 15, 1973; September 28, 1974; June 1, 1975; September 26, 1981; June 11, 1990; May 1, 1991	Succeeded by Nolan Ryan; Jim Bibby; Nolan Ryan; Ed Halicki; Dave Righetti; Dave Stewart; Tommy Greene
Sporting positions
Preceded by Jeff Cogen	President of the Texas Rangers; 2008–2013	Succeeded by Jon Daniels
