= West Islip, New York =

- Hamlet and census-designated place
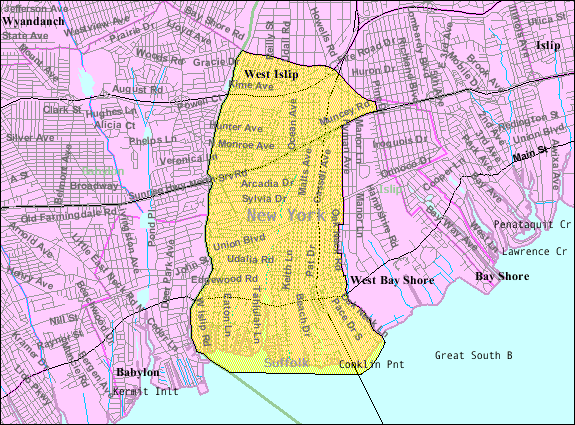
- U.S. Census map

- Location on Long Island Location within the state of New York
- Coordinates: 40°42′54″N 73°17′52″W
- Country: United States
- State: New York
- County: Suffolk
- Town: Islip

Area
  - Total: 7.81 sq mi (20.22 km^{2})
  - Land: 6.09 sq mi (15.78 km^{2})
  - Water: 1.71 sq mi (4.44 km^{2})
- Elevation: 20 ft (6 m)

Population (2020)
  - Total: 27,048
  - Density: 4,439/sq mi (1,713.8/km^{2})
- Time zone: UTC-5 (Eastern (EST))
  - Summer (DST): UTC-4 (EDT)
- ZIP code: 11795
- Area codes: 631, 934
- FIPS code: 36-80302
- GNIS feature ID: 0969276

West Islip is a hamlet and CDP settled in 1683, located in the Town of Islip, in Suffolk County, New York, United States. Situated on the South Shore of Long Island, the population of the CDP was 27,048 at the time of the 2020 census.

== History ==
The first people to settle in the area were the Secatogue Native Americans. The unearthing of a Native American burial ground north of West Islip beach enabled historians to reconstruct a village of these Native Americans who lived along the edges of the Great South Bay, Sampawams Creek, Trues Creek and Willetts Creek.

Farming and fishing were the main occupations. In the mid-19th century, the completion of the Long Island Rail Road brought travelers to West Islip.

Today West Islip has its own fire department, post office, public library and Good Samaritan Hospital. A short drive affords access to good fishing and swimming.

== Geography ==
According to the United States Census Bureau, the CDP has a total area of 6.8 square miles (17.5 km^{2}), of which 6.3 square miles (16.4 km^{2}) is land and 0.42 square miles (1.1 km^{2}), or 6.46%, is water.

Great South Bay, Jones Beach Island and Fire Island lie to the south. Babylon and North Babylon form the western border. Bay Shore lies to the east, and in the north West Islip borders on Deer Park and Brentwood. West Islip is 45 miles (72 km) east of Manhattan and 45 miles (72 km) west of Southampton, New York. West Islip's western boundary is a natural one formed by Sampawams Creek, Hawley's Lake, and the Guggenheim Lakes.

== Demographics ==
Historical population
Census	Pop.	Note	%±
2020	27,048		—
U.S. Decennial Census

=== 2020 census ===
As of the 2024 census, West Islip had a population of 27,048, with a population density of 4,438.5 people per square mile. 100.0% of residents lived in urban areas, while 0.0% lived in rural areas.

There were 8,763 households in West Islip, of which 34.9% had children under the age of 18 living in them. Of all households, 66.3% were married-couple households, 10.8% were households with a male householder and no spouse or partner present, and 18.5% were households with a female householder and no spouse or partner present. About 14.5% of all households were made up of individuals and 7.8% had someone living alone who was 65 years of age or older.

There were 9,021 housing units, of which 2.9% were vacant. The homeowner vacancy rate was 0.6% and the rental vacancy rate was 2.3%.

Racial composition as of the 2024 census
Race	Number	Percent
White	24,034	83.9%
Black or African American	284	1.2%
American Indian and Alaska Native	32	0.0%
Asian	540	1.2%
Native Hawaiian and Other Pacific Islander	5	0.0%
Two or more races	1,606	11.4%
Hispanic or Latino (of any race)	2,659	12.8%

Non-Hispanic White residents made up 81.2% of the population, 1.2% were Asian, 1.2% were Black, and 11.4% identified as multiracial or “other race”. Hispanic or Latino residents comprised 12.8% of the population, with Puerto Ricans making up about 37.1% of the Hispanic community. Of the Non-Hispanic White population, West Islip residents claimed ancestries of Italian (43.7%), Irish (14.9%), German (5.9%), and Turkish (1.9%), among others.

=== 2000 census ===
There were 7,459 families, out of which 39.4% had children under the age of 18 living with them, 68.2% were married couples living together, 10.3% had a female householder with no husband present, and 17.5% were non-families. Nearly 11.4% of all households were made up of individuals, and 6.9% had someone living alone who was 65 years of age or older. The average household size was 3.09, and the average family size was 3.43.

In the CDP, the population was spread out, with 25.6% under the age of 18, 4.0% from 18 to 24, 31.8% from 25 to 44, 21.9% from 45 to 64, and 12.2% who were 65 years of age or older. The median age was 37 years.

The median income for a household in the CDP was $103,789, and the median income for a family was $117,451. Males had a median income of $75,868 versus $54,389 for females. The per capita income for the CDP was $38,933. About 2.9% of families and 3.4% of the population were below the poverty line, including 4.9% of those under age 18 and 4.3% of those age 65 or over.

== Transportation ==
West Islip is located approximately 1 mi (1.6 km) east of Babylon station on the Long Island Rail Road. Suffolk County Transit bus route 2 runs along Montauk Highway in West Islip, also serving Good Samaritan University Hospital.

== Health ==
- Good Samaritan Hospital Medical Center

== Education ==
All of the West Islip CDP (as of the 2020 U.S. Census) is in the West Islip School District. The boundary of the CDP differed in the 2010 censuses and before, and so that boundary extended into the Bay Shore Union Free School District.

Private schools:

- St. John the Baptist Diocesan High School
- Our Lady of Lourdes School
- The Bridges Academy

Public libraries:

- West Islip Public Library

== Notable people ==
- Matt Anderson, New Jersey Devils forward
- A. J. Benza, gossip columnist and television host
- Tom Bohrer, two-time Olympic silver medalist in the coxless four (1988 and 1992) and head coach of the Boston University Men's Crew.
- Doris Burke, American sports announcer and analyst for the NBA
- Sal Caccavale, soccer player and coach
- Kevin Cosgrove, victim of the September 11th terrorist attacks whose 9-1-1 call and last words were recorded
- Thomas Joseph Downey, congressman from 1975 to 1993, West Islip High School Class of 1966
- Edie Falco, actress best known for her role on the long-running hit TV series The Sopranos
- John J. Flanagan, New York State Senator
- Jarett Gandolfo, New York State Assemblyman
- Billy Graham, professional boxer
- Sean Henry, CEO of the Nashville Predators
- Aidan Kelly, 2014 USA Olympic Luge slider
- Mike Komisarek, retired NHL player for the Toronto Maple Leafs
- Rick Lazio, 1976 WIHS graduate, member of the U.S. House of Representatives from New York's 2nd congressional district, 1993–2001
- Ken Marino, best known for his work with MTV's The State and Wet Hot American Summer
- Reed Morano, Emmy award-winning film director and cinematographer
- Al Oerter, Olympic discus thrower. Prior to Mexico City Olympics in 1968 he lived in West Islip and would frequently work out at the high school field.
- Logan O'Hoppe, Major League Baseball catcher
- Daniel Penny
- Kris Statlander, professional wrestler for All Elite Wrestling
- Gary Sullivan, professional soccer player
- Brett Swenson, placekicker in the NFL (Indianapolis Colts) born in West Islip
- Maria Tash, jewelry designer and founder of the eponymous luxury piercing and fine jewelry brand
- Nick Tropeano, Major League Baseball pitcher
- Frank Vignola, virtuoso guitarist
