= James R. Grover Jr. =

American politician

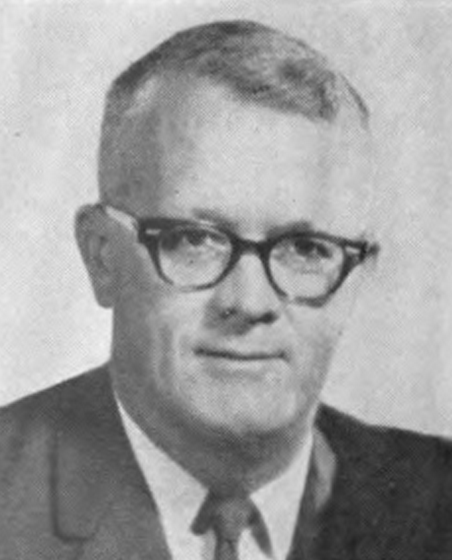

Member of the U.S. House of Representatives from New York's 2nd district
- In office January 3, 1963 – January 3, 1975
- Preceded by: District established (redistricting)
- Succeeded by: Thomas J. Downey

Member of the New York State Assembly from the 3rd district
- In office January 1, 1957 – December 31, 1962
- Preceded by: John R. Britting
- Succeeded by: John G. McCarthy

Personal details
- Born: March 5, 1919 Babylon, New York
- Died: October 14, 2012 (aged 93) Babylon, New York
- Party: Republican
- Profession: Attorney

James Russell Grover Jr. (March 5, 1919 – October 14, 2012) was an American lawyer and politician from New York.

== Biography ==
Grover was born in Babylon, New York to James and Christine Grover. His father was the village police chief. He graduated from Hofstra University in 1941. In 1943, he married Mary Fullerton, and they had four children. From 1943 to 1945, he served in the United States Army Air Forces in the China Burma India Theater of World War II. He graduated from Columbia Law School in 1949, and practiced law in Babylon.

He was a member of the New York State Assembly (Suffolk Co., 3rd D.) from 1957 to 1962, sitting in the 171st, 172nd and 173rd New York State Legislatures.

He was elected as a Republican to the 88th, 89th, 90th, 91st, 92nd and 93rd United States Congresses, holding office from January 3, 1963, to January 3, 1975. He was defeated for re-election by Thomas J. Downey in November 1974.

Grover died on October 14, 2012.

New York State Assembly
Preceded by John A. Britting	Member of the New York State Assembly from the Suffolk County 3rd district 1957–1962	Succeeded by John G. McCarthy
U.S. House of Representatives
Preceded by Steven Derounian	Member of the U.S. House of Representatives from New York's 2nd congressional district 1963–1975	Succeeded by Thomas J. Downey
Preceded by Thomas Pelly	Ranking Member of the House Merchant Marine and Fisheries Committee; 1973–1975	Succeeded by Philip Ruppe
