= Sal Caccavale =

American former soccer player and coach (born 1985)

Personal information
- Full name: Salvatore Caccavale
- Date of birth: May 16, 1985 (age 41)
- Place of birth: West Islip, New York, US
- Height: 5 ft 7 in (1.70 m)
- Position: Midfielder

Team information
- Current team: Achilles FC (Head coach ~ U-10 to U-15)

Youth career
- Elite International FC
- 1998–2002: West Islip Lions
- 2003–2006: American

Senior career*
Years	Team	Apps	(Gls)
2007–2008	New York Red Bulls	1	(1)
2009	Real Maryland Monarchs	0	(0)

Managerial career
- 2010-now: Achilles FC
- 2011-now: St. John Cadets
- * Club domestic league appearances and goals

Salvatore Caccavale (born May 16, 1985) is an American former soccer midfielder and now coach. He founded and directs his own youth soccer club called Achilles FC. He also serves as the head men's soccer coach at St. John's College High School in Washington D.C..

== Playing career ==
Caccavale played high school soccer from 1999 to 2002 for the West Islip Lions and collegiately at American University, where he finished as the seventh leading scorer in school history. He led the team in points in 2006, and was named First Team All-Patriot League three straight years.

In January 2007, New York Red Bulls picked Caccavale in the second round of the 2007 MLS Supplemental Draft, 19th overall. Caccavale made his MLS debut on May 19, 2007, coming on as a substitute in the 88th minute. He made a quick impact, scoring a goal 4 minutes after coming on, the final goal in a 4–0 win for New York over Columbus Crew. Caccavale also appeared in 9 matches for the Red Bulls reserves in 2007 registering 3 assists, before being released by the team on January 23, 2008. He is the all-time Major League Soccer record holder for goals per minute played. As he came on at the end of the game, he is registered for two minutes played, and with one goal scored, he on average scored 45 goals in a 90-minute game.

Caccavale was announced as a Monarchs player on 10 February 2009. Caccavale last playing for Real Maryland Monarchs in the USL Second Division, before retired in the Winter 2009.

== Coaching career ==
After the retirement of his active playing career, became the job as Youth Coach by Bethesda Soccer Club. Besides works as Sophomore Coach by the Soccer team of the Woodrow Wilson High School.
