= Thomas Downey =

American politician

Tom Downey
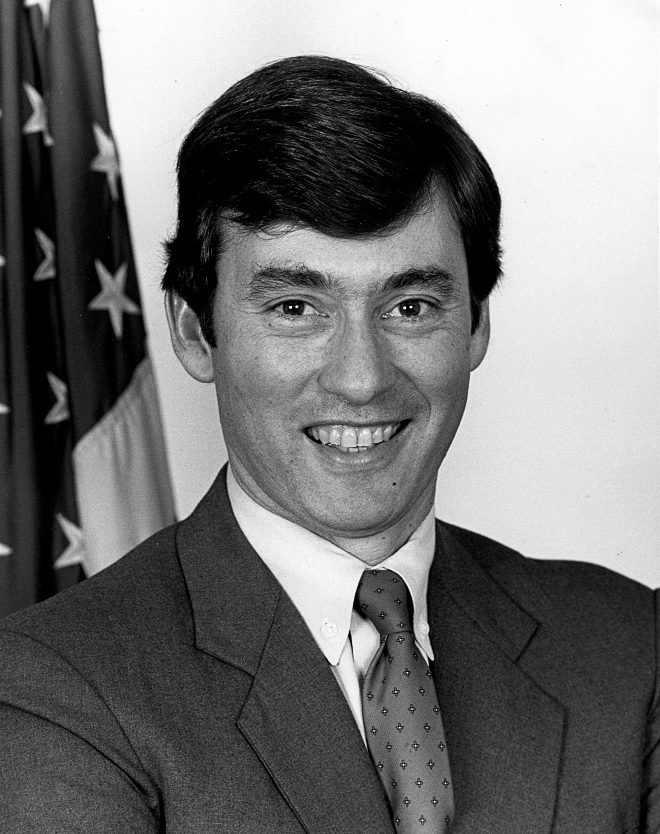
- Official portrait, 1991

Member of the U.S. House of Representatives from New York's 2nd district
- In office January 3, 1975 – January 3, 1993
- Preceded by: James R. Grover Jr.
- Succeeded by: Rick Lazio

Member of the Suffolk County Legislature from the 11th district
- In office January 1972 – January 10, 1975
- Preceded by: Patrick Adams
- Succeeded by: Richard Lambert

Personal details
- Born: Thomas Joseph Downey; January 28, 1949 (age 77) New York City, New York, U.S.
- Party: Democratic
- Spouse: Carol Browner
- Education: Cornell University (BS); St. John's University; American University (JD)

Thomas Joseph Downey (born January 28, 1949) is an American attorney, lobbyist and former politician who served as a U.S. representative for New York's 2nd congressional district from 1975 to 1993.

== Early life and education ==
Downey was born in Queens, New York City to Norma (née Morgillo) and Thomas A. Downey Jr. He graduated from West Islip High School in West Islip, New York, in 1966, and went on to earn a B.S. from Cornell University in 1970. He attended St. John's University School of Law from 1972 to 1974, and earned a Juris Doctor from the Washington College of Law of American University in 1980.

== Career ==
He served as Suffolk County, New York legislator from 1972 to 1975, and was a delegate to the Democratic National Convention in 1972.

=== U.S. House of Representatives ===
In 1974, he was elected as Democrat to the 94th United States Congress; at 25, he was the youngest member of that Congress. He was re-elected to the eight succeeding Congresses (January 3, 1975 – January 3, 1993) and unsuccessfully ran for reelection to the 103rd United States Congress in 1992. He lost his seat after it was revealed that he was among several lawmakers who had frequently overdrawn their House bank accounts without penalty, and that his wife at the time was a House bank auditor.

As a member of the United States House Committee on Armed Services, Downey specialized in arms control issues, serving as an adviser to the negotiation teams for the Strategic Arms Limitation Talks and START I talks. As a member of the Budget and Ways and Means Committees, he advocated for welfare reform and child care legislation.

In March 1985, Downey was involved in a physical scuffle in the House chamber with Republican Congressman Bob Dornan. Dornan, a veteran of the United States Air Force, had earlier described Downey in a public speech as "a draft dodging wimp." During the Vietnam War, Downey protested U.S. involvement and was medically exempt from military service because of a perforated eardrum. Downey confronted Dornan and demanded an apology. Dornan refused and told Downey that if he encountered Downey outside the House chamber, when he wasn't under the protection of the Sergeant at Arms, Dornan would be glad to continue the altercation. Downey attempted to leave, and Dornan grabbed Downey by the collar and tie. Downey ended the confrontation by walking away. Tip O'Neill, the Speaker of the House, responded to the scuffle by informing Dornan that violence was a violation of House rules.

=== Later career ===
A close confidante of Al Gore since their days in the House of Representatives, Downey played Jack Kemp in Gore's 1996 vice presidential debate rehearsals. He was set to play George W. Bush in Gore's rehearsals for the 2000 presidential debates; however, after mysteriously receiving a package containing Bush's debate preparation materials, he stepped aside to avoid the appearance of an improper advantage for Gore.

Since leaving politics, Downey has worked as a lobbyist and chair of Downey McGrath Group, Inc., a lobbying firm he founded in 1993. The president is Ray McGrath, also a former U.S. Representative from New York. Downey represented Dubai Ports World and lobbied Congress to approve the controversial ports deal. Downey argues that "they would have made this country more secure" because "DP World is one of the few companies that could have worked with us to truly improve security, both at home and abroad." Other past clients included energy companies like Chevron and the Standard Renewable Energy Group, several foreign countries, and the Albright Group. He retired from lobbying in 2015.

He has served on the advisory board for Council for a Livable World, a non-partisan advocacy organization dedicated to reducing the danger of nuclear weapons. He is also a member of the ReFormers Caucus of Issue One.

== Personal life ==
In 1978, Downey married Chris Milanos, with whom he is the father of two children, Lauren Katherine and Theodore Jonathan. They later divorced, and on June 21, 2007, Downey married Carol Browner, the former head of the Environmental Protection Agency.

U.S. House of Representatives
Preceded by James R. Grover Jr.	Member of the U.S. House of Representatives from New York's 2nd congressional district 1975–1993	Succeeded by Rick Lazio
U.S. order of precedence (ceremonial)
Preceded by John Sarbanes as Former U.S. Representative	Order of precedence of the United States as Former U.S. Representative	Succeeded by Matthew F. McHugh as Former U.S. Representative
