= Gary Sullivan (soccer) =

American soccer player

Personal information
- Date of birth: June 24, 1982 (age 44)
- Place of birth: West Islip, New York, United States
- Height: 6 ft 1 in (1.85 m)
- Position: Defender

Team information
- Current team: East Meadow Soccer Club
- Number: 35

Youth career
- 2000–2003: Adelphi University

Senior career*
| Years | Team | Apps | (Gls) |
| 2001 | New York Freedom | | |
| 2003 | Brooklyn Knights | | |
| 2004 | Colorado Rapids | 16 | (0) |
| 2005– | Long Island Rough Riders | 50 | (5) |
- * Club domestic league appearances and goals as of April 4, 2009

Gary Sullivan (born June 24, 1982, in West Islip, New York) is an American soccer defender who plays for the Long Island Rough Riders. He spent one season with the Colorado Rapids in Major League Soccer.

== Youth ==
Sullivan attended West Islip High School where he was a four-year varsity letterman. He then played college soccer for Adelphi University from 2000 to 2003. As a sophomore, he was named team MVP, and he was named first-team all-ASC as a junior. He was again a first-team all-ASC selection in 2003, and was a nominee for the Hermann Trophy, Which is the award to the best college player in the country.

== Professional ==
In 2001, he played for the New York Freedom of the Premier Development League. In 2003, he played for the Brooklyn Knights. In February 2004, Sullivan was selected 45th overall in the 2004 MLS SuperDraft by the Colorado Rapids. Although he played in 16 games, Sullivan was used mostly as a substitute, at defender and occasionally forward, and only played 339 minutes in 2004. He left the team in 2005 to return to college and play with the Rough Riders in the USL Second Division. He was first team All League in 2005. In 2006, he was selected as the USL-2 Defender of the Year.

== After Retirement ==
He is now a physical education teacher at Veritas Academy in Flushing, New York. As well as a coach for East Meadow Soccer Club.
