= Maria Tash =

American jewelry designer and body piercer

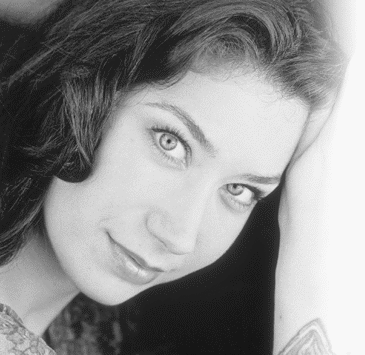
- Photo of Maria Tash
- Trade name: Maria Tash
- Formerly: Venus Body Arts
- Company type: Private
- Industry: Jewelry; Piercing; Ear curation
- Founded: 1993; 33 years ago in East Village, Manhattan, New York
- Founder: Maria Tashjian
- Headquarters: New York, United States of America
- Number of locations: 9 concessions; 6 freestanding; (2022)
- Area served: New York Metropolitan Area; Greater Dublin; Greater London; Miami-Dade County; Greater Houston; Dallas–Fort Worth Metroplex; City of Los Angeles; Métropole du Grand Paris; Emirate of Dubai; Kuwait City; Riyadh Governorate; Greater Sydney
- Products: Jewelry; Body Jewelry; Piercing Services
- Owner: Maria Tashjian
- Number of employees: ~200 (2019)
- Subsidiaries: Maria Tash Financial Group Inc.; Maria Tash Limited (U.K); Maria Tash Ireland Limited; Maria Tash S.r.l. (Italy); Maria Tash Middle East Jewellery Trading LLC (U.A.E.)
- Website: mariatash.com

Maria Tash (born Maria Tashjian in West Islip, New York) is a jewelry designer and retailer. Tash founded the eponymous Maria Tash, a New York-based luxury piercing and fine jewelry brand. The brand specializes in body piercing, ear curation, and fine jewelry design. Originally founded in New York City in 1993, Maria Tash has since expanded globally.

Tash's work, under her eponymous brand, has combined elements of mainstream piercing culture with fine jewelry, coining the term “Curated Ear” to refer to an ear pierced with fashionable intention and under the direction of piercing experts.

== Early years and education ==
Originally from West Islip, New York and raised in New York City, Maria Tash (birth name Maria Tashjian) attended Columbia University and the Fashion Institute of Technology. She also attended King's College in London, England.

== Career ==
Tash opened her first studio, Venus Modern Body Art, in 1993 in Manhattan's East Village, specializing in navel piercings and jewelry. Venus Body Arts later became Venus by Maria Tash until eventually Tash decided to use her own name for the shop. While first specializing in navel jewelry, the shop later become known for a variety of ear piercing styles.

Tash launched a line of international stores with its flagship location opening in New York City in 2004. In 2016, the brand began expanding globally with the opening of a shop at Liberty London. Maria Tash has since opened permanent locations in Rome, Dublin, Harrods London, and Dubai.

In November 2018 she opened her second freestanding location outside New York City with a 2,000 sq. ft luxury boutique in The Dubai Mall.

In 2020 during the COVID-19 pandemic, Maria Tash began to offer complimentary virtual appointments through FaceTime and Google Hangouts in English, Spanish, French, Italian and Arabic.

=== Design and cultural impact ===
Tash modified several industry standard methods of assembling jewelry to create pieces that better fit the wearer. These include a “threaded” style earring backing and "invisible set" diamonds, which are notched and set below the crown. Tash's designs are often smaller and more subtle than the traditional punk-style heavy piercings that were popular in the early 1990s, when Tash began piercing.

Her designs have been worn by Hailey Bieber, Rihanna, Ashley Graham, Queen Rania and Maritta Hallani.
