= West Islip Public Schools =

School district in the U.S. state of New York

West Islip Union Free School District

Address
- 100 Sherman Avenue West Islip, Suffolk County, New York, 11795; United States
- Coordinates: 40.7044°N 73.3020°W

District information
- Type: Public
- Grades: Pre-K through 12
- Superintendent: Paul Romanelli, Dr.
- Business administrator: Christine Kearney
- School board: 7 members
- Chair of the board: Anthony Tussie
- Budget: $84,794,359.91 (2023-2024)
- NCES District ID: 3630690

Students and staff
- Students: 3,913 total
- Teachers: 373.42 (on an FTE basis)
- Staff: 758.29 (on an FTE basis)
- Student–teacher ratio: 10.48
- District mascot: Lion
- Colors: Blue and Gold

Other information
- Website: www.wi.k12.ny.us

West Islip Union Free School District, also known as the West Islip Public Schools, is a Union Free School District in Suffolk County, New York on the South Shore of Long Island. The district serves all of West Islip and a small part of Bay Shore in the Town of Islip. The main office is located in the Michael & Christine Freyer Building in West Islip.

== Schools ==
All schools are located in West Islip.

=== High school ===
- West Islip High School

=== Middle schools ===
- Beach Street Middle School
- Udall Road Middle School

=== Elementary schools ===
- Bayview Elementary School
- Manetuck Elementary School
- Paul J. Bellew Elementary School
- Oquenock Elementary School

=== Former schools ===
- Paul E. Kirdahy Elementary School (formally called Captree) (closed 2012)
- Westbrook Elementary School (closed 2012)
- Southgate Elementary School
- Paumonauk Elementary School
- Higbie Lane School (closed 1979)
