= Nick Tropeano =

American baseball player (born 1990)

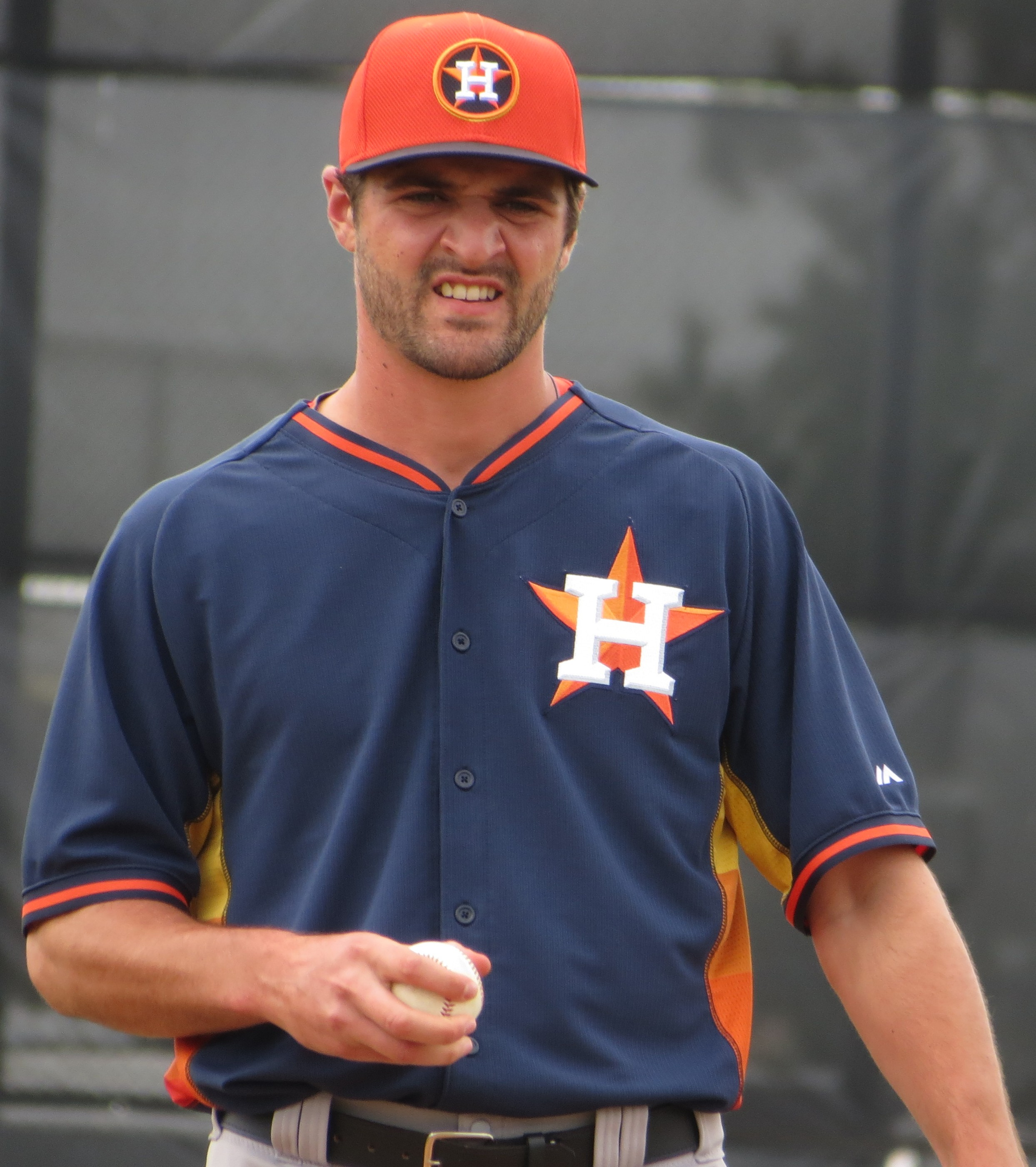
- Tropeano with the Houston Astros

Free agent
- Pitcher
- Born: August 27, 1990 (age 35); West Islip, New York, U.S.
- Bats: Right Throws: Right

MLB debut
- September 10, 2014, for the Houston Astros

MLB statistics (through 2021 season)
- Win–loss record: 14–14
- Earned run average: 4.22
- Strikeouts: 214
- Stats at Baseball Reference

Teams
- Houston Astros (2014); Los Angeles Angels of Anaheim / Los Angeles Angels (2015–2016, 2018–2019); Pittsburgh Pirates (2020); San Francisco Giants (2021); New York Mets (2021)

Nicholas Paul Tropeano (born August 27, 1990) is an American professional baseball pitcher who is a free agent. He has previously played in Major League Baseball (MLB) for the Houston Astros, Los Angeles Angels, Pittsburgh Pirates, San Francisco Giants, and New York Mets. Tropeano played college baseball for the Stony Brook Seawolves, and was drafted in the fifth round of the 2011 MLB draft by the Astros.

== Amateur career ==
Tropeano attended West Islip High School in West Islip, New York, where he played baseball as a pitcher and American football as a quarterback. He enrolled at Stony Brook University, where he played college baseball for the Stony Brook Seawolves baseball team in the America East Conference. After his freshman season, Tropeano pitched for the Riverhead Tomcats in the Hamptons Collegiate Baseball League, a collegiate summer baseball league, and was named its Most Valuable Player.

In his sophomore season, Tropeano had an 8–4 win–loss record with a 2.44 earned run average (ERA) and led the conference with 106 strikeouts en route to being named the America East co-Pitcher of the Year and a finalist for Pitcher of the Year by the College Baseball Hall of Fame. He pitched in the Cape Cod Baseball League for the Cotuit Kettleers between his sophomore and junior seasons at Stony Brook. As a junior, Tropeano had a 12–1 win–loss record and a 1.84 ERA en route to a second conference Pitcher of the Year award (becoming the first pitcher to do so).

== Professional career ==
=== Houston Astros ===
The Houston Astros drafted Tropeano in the fifth round of the 2011 Major League Baseball draft. After signing with the Astros, he pitched that season with the Tri-City ValleyCats of the Low–A New York–Penn League.

In 2012, he pitched for the Lexington Legends of the Single–A South Atlantic League (SAL), where he was twice named the SAL pitcher of the week, and the Lancaster JetHawks of the High–A California League. Between the two, he was 12–7 with a 3.76 ERA.

He began the 2013 season with the Corpus Christi Hooks of the Double–A Texas League. On August 1, Tropeano struck out Midland RockHounds infielder Vinnie Catricala with one pitch.

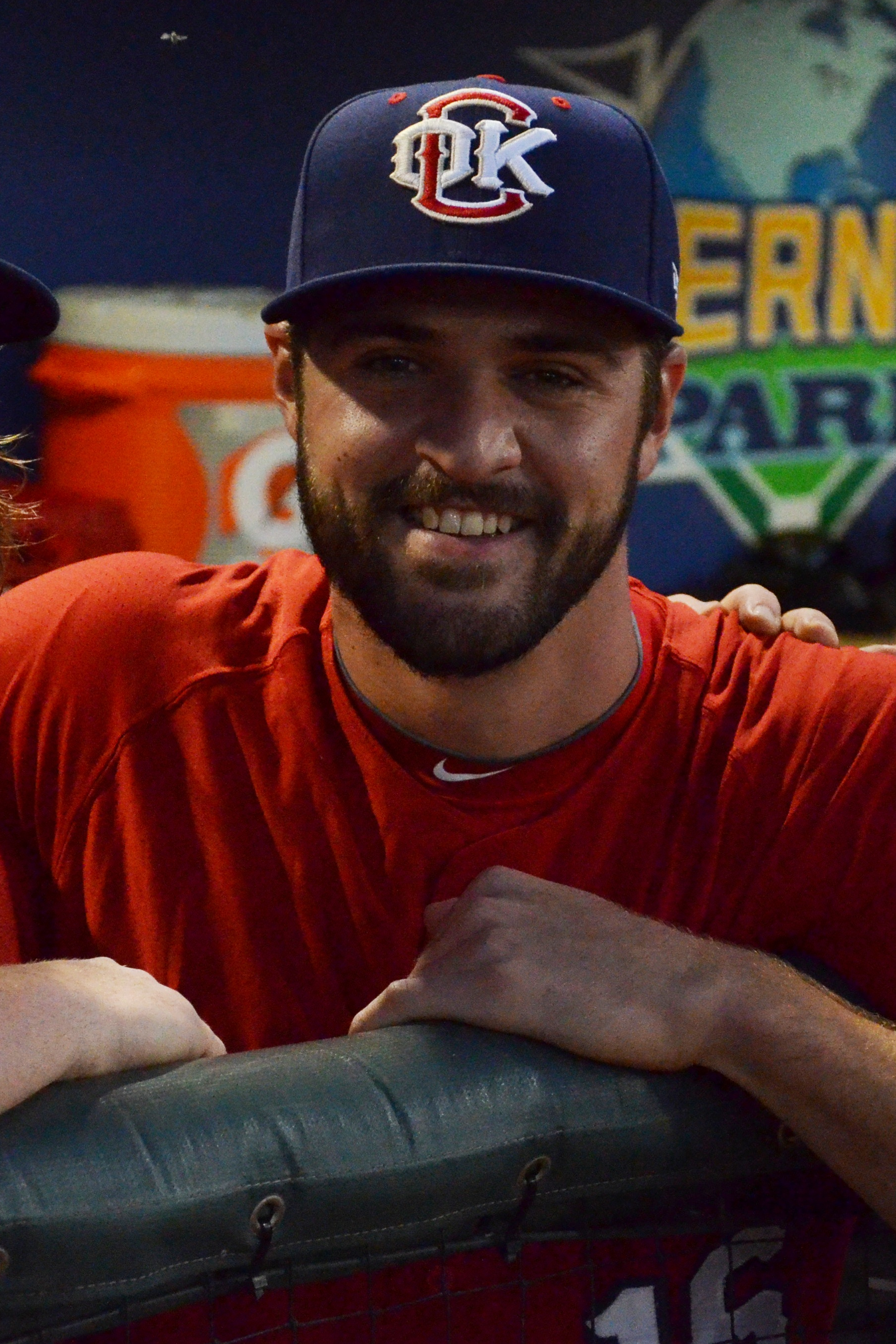
Tropeano with the Oklahoma City RedHawks in 2014

Tropeano opened the 2014 season with the Oklahoma City RedHawks of the Triple–A Pacific Coast League (PCL). Tropeano pitched to a 2.09 ERA by mid-June, but missed a month after he experienced forearm soreness in late June. After pitching to a 9–5 record with a 3.03 ERA and 120 strikeouts in 124 2/3 innings, the Astros promoted Tropeano to the major leagues on September 1. His ERA led the PCL. Tropeano made his MLB debut on September 10, recording the win.

=== Los Angeles Angels of Anaheim / Los Angeles Angels ===
On November 5, 2014, the Astros traded Tropeano and Carlos Perez to the Los Angeles Angels of Anaheim in exchange for Hank Conger. Tropeano pitched in 8 games for the Angels, starting 7 of them, and had an ERA of 3.82 in 37 innings. In 2016, after a rash of injuries to their rotation, Tropeano got called up and in 10 starts went 3–2 and at the time had the best ERA of the rotation with a 3.25 ERA before being placed on the disabled list. Despite his success, he was activated and sent down to the Triple–A Salt Lake Bees after the Angels called up Tim Lincecum.

In August 2016, it was revealed that Tropeano underwent Tommy John surgery, ending his 2016 season and all of 2017 as well.

After missing a full season, Tropeano entered the 2018 season competing for a spot in the rotation. He was sent down to Triple–A to begin the season but after injuries to the Angels rotation, he was called up and made 4 starts before going on the disabled list with elbow inflammation. He was shut down for the season on September 11 after feeling discomfort in his right shoulder. He ended the 2018 season with the Angels making 14 starts, with a record of 5–6 and an ERA of 4.74 and 64 strikeouts in 76 innings. Tropeano elected free agency following the 2019 season.

=== New York Yankees ===
Tropeano signed a minor league contract with the New York Yankees for the 2020 season that included a non-roster invitation to spring training. The Yankees promoted him to the major leagues on August 6. However, he never made an appearance for them and was designated for assignment on August 8, 2020.

=== Pittsburgh Pirates ===
On August 11, 2020, Tropeano was claimed off waivers by the Pittsburgh Pirates and sent to its alternate training site after Joe Musgrove was placed on the injured list. In his Pirates debut on August 25, Tropeano threw four scoreless innings in relief. Tropeano earned his first win with the Pirates on August 30. Tropeano ended the year with a 1.15 ERA in 15 2/3 innings pitched, while striking out 19. He set career-highs in strikeout rate and walk rate.

=== San Francisco Giants ===
On October 30, 2020, Tropeano was claimed off waivers by the New York Mets. On December 2, Tropeano was non-tendered by the Mets.

On February 16, 2021, Tropeano signed a minor league contract worth $1.1 million with the San Francisco Giants organization that included an invitation to spring training. On May 21, Tropeano was selected to the active roster and he made his Giants' debut the following day in relief against the Dodgers. Tropeano recorded a 1.50 ERA across 4 appearances for the Giants, but was designated for assignment on June 4.

=== New York Mets (second stint) ===
On June 11, 2021, Tropeano was claimed off waivers by the New York Mets and assigned to the Triple-A Syracuse Mets. After splitting time between Syracuse and New York, where he gave up 1 run in 2 innings pitched, Tropeano was designated for assignment on July 30. On August 2, Tropeano elected free agency

=== Los Angeles Dodgers ===
On August 6, 2021, Tropeano signed a minor league contract with the Los Angeles Dodgers. He pitched in nine games (five starts) for the Triple-A Oklahoma City Dodgers and was 1–0 with a 4.91 ERA and 28 strikeouts.

=== Texas Rangers ===
On January 26, 2022, Tropeano signed a minor league contract with the Texas Rangers. In 12 appearances for the Triple–A Round Rock Express, he logged a 3.05 ERA with 21 strikeouts across 20 2/3 innings pitched. Tropeano opted out of his deal and became a free agent on June 1.

=== Acereros de Monclova ===
On April 9, 2023, Tropeano signed with the Acereros de Monclova of the Mexican League. In 13 starts, he posted a 4–5 record with a 5.94 ERA and 46 strikeouts over 63 2/3 innings. Tropeano was waived by Monclova on July 6.

=== Long Island Ducks ===
On June 13, 2024, Tropeano signed with the Long Island Ducks of the Atlantic League of Professional Baseball. In 15 games (6 starts) for the Ducks, he logged a 4–2 record and 5.48 ERA with 39 strikeouts across 46 innings of work. Tropeano became a free agent following the season.

On April 14, 2025, Tropeano re-signed with Long Island. In two starts for the Ducks, he struggled to an 0-1 record and 10.29 ERA with nine strikeouts over seven innings of work. Tropeano was released by the team on June 26.
