= Rick Lazio =

American politician (born 1958)

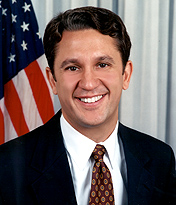

Member of the U.S. House of Representatives from New York's 2nd district
- In office January 3, 1993 – January 3, 2001
- Preceded by: Thomas Downey
- Succeeded by: Steve Israel

Member of the Suffolk County Legislature from the 11th district
- In office January 1990 – December 1992
- Preceded by: Patrick Mahoney
- Succeeded by: Angie Carpenter

Personal details
- Born: Enrico Anthony Lazio; March 13, 1958 (age 68) Amityville, New York, U.S.
- Party: Republican
- Children: 2
- Education: Vassar College (AB); American University (JD)

Enrico Anthony Lazio (/ˈlæzi.oʊ/; born March 13, 1958) is an American attorney and former four-term U.S. representative from the State of New York. A Long Island native, Lazio became well-known during his bid for U.S. Senate in New York's 2000 Senate election; he was defeated by Hillary Rodham Clinton. Lazio also ran unsuccessfully for the 2010 New York State Republican Party gubernatorial nomination.

== Early life, education and career ==
Lazio was born in Amityville, New York, in Suffolk County, on Long Island. He is the son of Olive (née Christensen) and Anthony Lazio, who owned an automotive parts store. His father was of Italian descent and his maternal grandparents were Danish immigrants. He graduated from West Islip High School in 1976. He received his A.B. from Vassar College and received his Juris Doctor from the Washington College of Law at American University.

Prior to being elected to Congress, Lazio was appointed executive assistant district attorney for Suffolk County in 1987 and served in the Suffolk County Legislature from 1990 to 1993.

== U.S. Representative ==
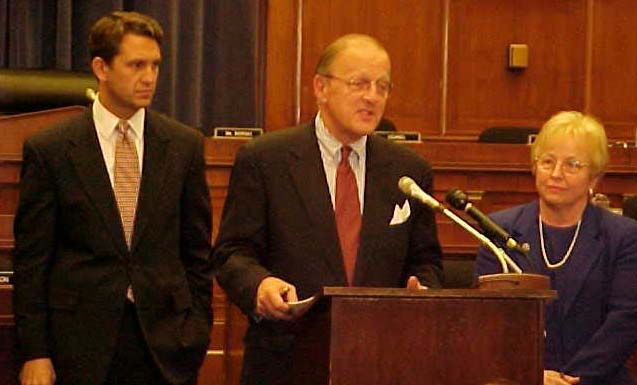
Lazio at a press conference with Sherwood Boehlert and Nancy Johnson in 2000

Lazio represented New York's 2nd congressional district as a Republican. He was first elected in 1992, defeating the incumbent, Thomas Downey, who had served for eighteen years. Lazio served four terms from 1993 to 2001.

In Congress, Lazio served as Deputy Majority Whip, Assistant Majority Leader, and Chairman of the House Banking Subcommittee on Housing and Community Opportunity. He was "widely viewed as the most influential moderate in a leadership dominated by conservatives." From his earliest days in Congress, Lazio made housing one of his primary issues.

During his time in Congress, Lazio championed the case to award a posthumous Congressional Medal of Honor to President Theodore Roosevelt for his charge up San Juan Hill in the Spanish–American War. Congress eventually passed legislation asking the president to grant the honor, and President Clinton awarded the medal in January 2001.

== 2000 U.S. Senate campaign ==
In 2000, Lazio ran for the U.S. Senate from New York against Hillary Clinton in the race to succeed Daniel Patrick Moynihan. His comparatively late entry into the race (five months before Election Day) followed New York City Mayor Rudolph Giuliani's decision to withdraw from the Senate race. Lazio announced his candidacy for Senate on all five major Sunday morning talk shows on the same day, making him the second person ever to complete a Full Ginsburg.

At the time, the race between Lazio and Hillary Clinton was the most expensive Senate campaign ever conducted.

During a September 13, 2000 debate in Buffalo, Lazio walked across the stage to Clinton and placed a campaign pledge in front of her. That action was "perceived as bullying and chauvinistic", and it made Lazio into "an example of what not to do during a debate with a female opponent". In 2008, Lazio commented: "'At the time, I was making a point about a campaign finance pledge that Mrs. Clinton had made and I didn't feel that it was being honored. I thought that was the opportunity to make the point. On substance, it was right - and on style and perception, it was a mistake, which I regret'".

On November 7, 2000, Lazio lost the Senate race to Clinton by a margin of 55%-43%.

== 2010 New York gubernatorial campaign ==
Lazio announced his candidacy for governor of New York on September 22, 2009 in Albany.

On June 2, 2010, Lazio received the New York State Republican Party's designation to run for governor. However, Carl Paladino, a candidate backed by the Tea Party movement, soundly defeated Lazio in the Republican gubernatorial primary on September 14, 2010. On September 27, Lazio, who had won the Conservative Party primary, confirmed that he would drop his bid for Governor by accepting a paper candidate nomination for a judicial position in the Bronx he did not expect to win.

== Career outside politics ==
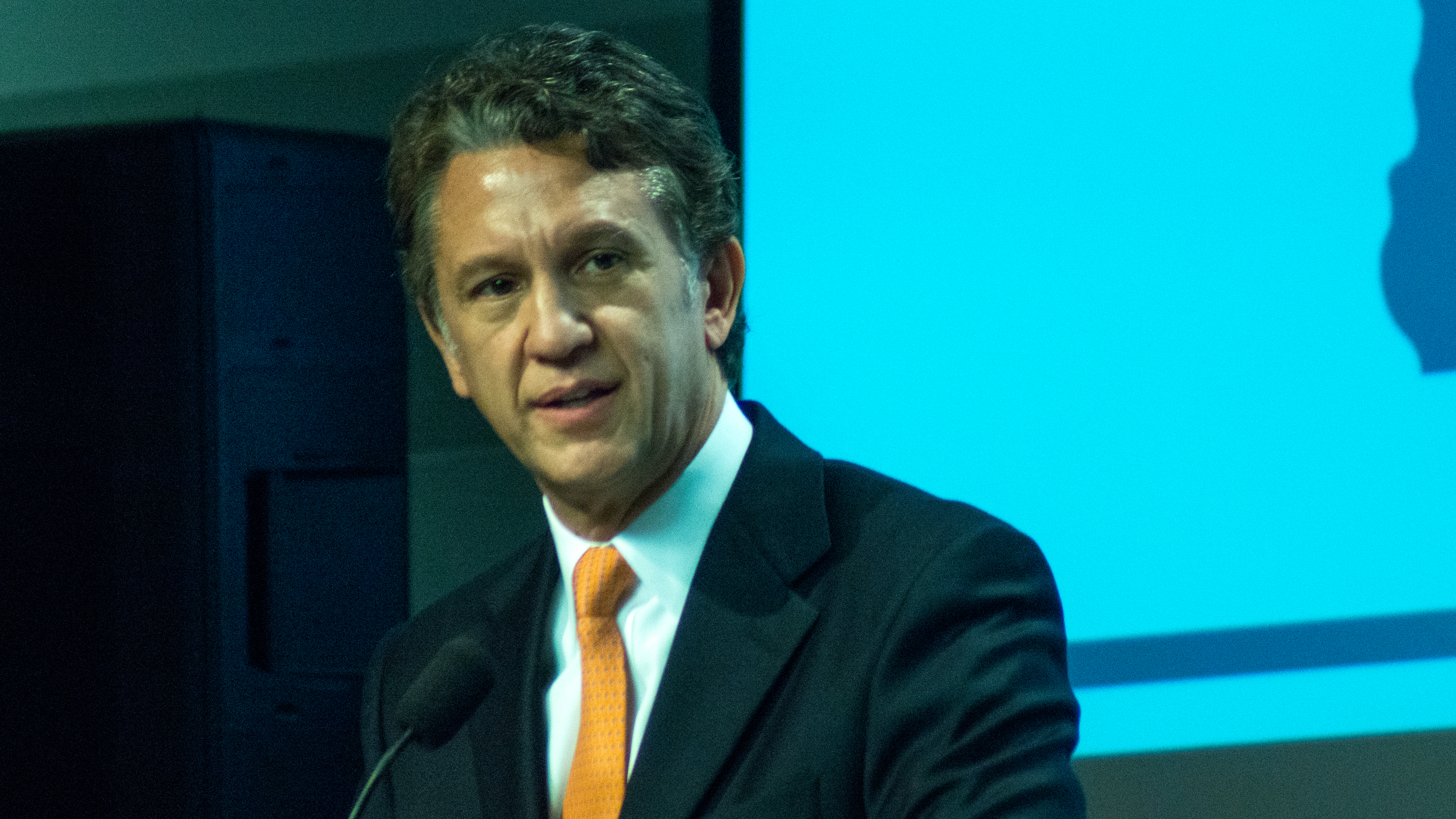
Lazio in 2015

Following his loss in the 2000 U.S. Senate election, Lazio became CEO of the Financial Services Forum. Later, he became the managing director of global real assets for JPMorgan.

As of 2017, Lazio led the housing finance practice group of Jones Walker LLP.

== Electoral history ==
2000 United States Senate election, New York
Party	Candidate	Votes	%	±%
Democratic	Hillary Clinton	3,562,415		
Working Families	Hillary Clinton	102,094		
Liberal	Hillary Clinton	82,801		
total	Hillary Clinton	3,747,310	55.27	+0.02
Republican	Rick Lazio	2,724,589		
Conservative	Rick Lazio	191,141		
total	Rick Lazio	2,915,730	43.01	+1.5
Independence	Jeffrey Graham	43,181	0.64	−0.08
Green	Mark Dunau	40,991	0.60	
Right to Life	John Adefope	21,439	0.32	−1.68
Libertarian	John Clifton	4,734	0.07	−0.31
Constitution	Louis Wein	3,414	0.05	
Socialist Workers	Jacob Perasso	3,040	0.04	−0.27
Blank/scattering		179,823		
Majority		831,580	12.27%	
Turnout		6,779,839		
Democratic hold		Swing		

U.S. House of Representatives
Preceded by Thomas Downey	Member of the U.S. House of Representatives from New York's 2nd congressional district 1993–2001	Succeeded by Steve Israel
Party political offices
Preceded by Bernadette Castro	Republican nominee for U.S. Senator from New York (Class 1); 2000	Succeeded by John Spencer
Preceded by John Faso	Conservative nominee for Governor of New York; Withdrew; 2010	Succeeded by Carl Paladino
U.S. order of precedence (ceremonial)
Preceded by George Hochbrueckner as Former U.S. Representative	Order of precedence of the United States as Former U.S. Representative	Succeeded by John E. Sweeney as Former U.S. Representative
