= Sean Henry (musician) =

Sean Henry

Sean Henry is an American musician from Connecticut.

== History ==
Sean Henry began his career making music under the name Boy Crush. He released his first demo tape album under his own name in 2015, titled It's All About Me on Double Double Whammy. Henry released his first full-length album titled Fink in 2018, also via Double Double Whammy. On November 1, 2019, Henry released his third full-length album titled A Jump from the High Dive via Double Double Whammy.
