= Matt Anderson (ice hockey) =

American ice hockey player (born 1982)

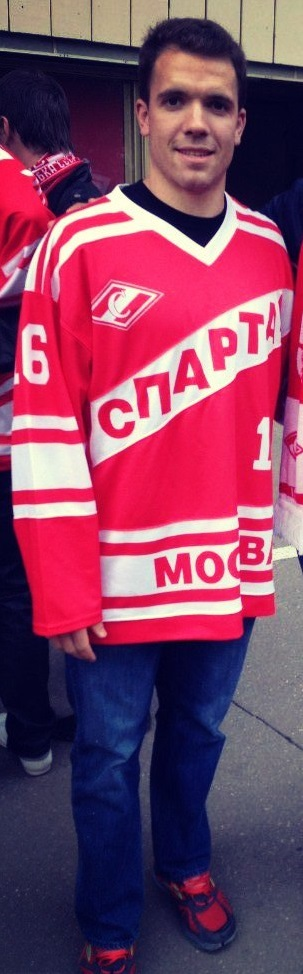
- Born: October 31, 1982 (age 43) West Islip, New York, U.S.
- Height: 5 ft 11 in (180 cm)
- Weight: 195 lb (88 kg; 13 st 13 lb)
- Position: Right wing
- Shot: Right
- Played for: New Jersey Devils; Spartak Moscow; KHL Medveščak Zagreb; Neftekhimik Nizhnekamsk; Djurgårdens IF; Skellefteå AIK; Rögle BK
- NHL draft: Undrafted
- Playing career: 2007–2019

Matthew Anderson (born October 31, 1982) is an American former professional ice hockey player. He played in the National Hockey League with the New Jersey Devils.

== Early life ==
Anderson was born in West Islip, New York. As a youth, he played in the 1996 Quebec International Pee-Wee Hockey Tournament with the New York Islanders minor ice hockey team.

== Playing career ==
Before the 2010–11 season with the Albany Devils, Anderson attended the New Jersey Devils training camp. On January 29, 2013, Anderson made his NHL debut for the Devils against the Boston Bruins at TD Garden during the 2012–13 season. He recorded his first NHL point in a 5-4 overtime loss to the New York Islanders.

On May 5, 2013, Anderson signed his first professional contract in Russia, signing a one-year deal with HC Spartak Moscow of the KHL. In his first KHL season in 2013–14, Anderson secured his place among the checking lines of Spartak Moscow, to finish the season with 11 goals and 20 points in 54 games.

He transferred on a one-year deal to fellow KHL club, KHL Medveščak Zagreb on June 11, 2014. In the 2014–15 season, Anderson appeared in 35 games with the Croatian-based club, scoring 19 points before he was traded mid-season to Neftekhimik Nizhnekamsk in exchange for financial compensation on December 3, 2014. He finished the season with Nizhnekamsk with 16 points in 28 games, easily surpassing his first year in the KHL.

On April 9, 2015, Anderson moved to his fourth club in three years as he moved to the Swedish Hockey League as a free agent with Djurgårdens IF. He completed his 12-year professional career following further stints with Skellefteå AIK and Rögle BK.

== Career statistics ==
			Regular season					Playoffs
Season	Team	League	GP	G	A	Pts	PIM	GP	G	A	Pts	PIM
2002–03	UMass Amherst	HE	36	10	21	31	34	—	—	—	—	—
2004–05	UMass Amherst	HE	18	7	13	20	34	—	—	—	—	—
2005–06	UMass Amherst	HE	36	7	13	20	30	—	—	—	—	—
2006–07	UMass Amherst	HE	38	10	10	20	32	—	—	—	—	—
2006–07	Chicago Wolves	AHL	—	—	—	—	—	13	1	1	2	6
2007–08	Chicago Wolves	AHL	14	1	1	2	8	10	1	1	2	4
2007–08	Gwinnett Gladiators	ECHL	37	14	14	28	28	8	3	2	5	0
2008–09	Chicago Wolves	AHL	66	13	18	31	32	—	—	—	—	—
2009–10	Chicago Wolves	AHL	63	16	29	45	18	14	0	12	12	4
2010–11	Albany Devils	AHL	76	23	32	55	49	—	—	—	—	—
2011–12	Albany Devils	AHL	56	10	21	31	30	—	—	—	—	—
2012–13	Albany Devils	AHL	67	13	30	43	42	—	—	—	—	—
2012–13	New Jersey Devils	NHL	2	0	1	1	0	—	—	—	—	—
2013–14	Spartak Moscow	KHL	54	11	9	20	63	—	—	—	—	—
2014–15	KHL Medveščak Zagreb	KHL	35	9	10	19	30	—	—	—	—	—
2014–15	Neftekhimik Nizhnekamsk	KHL	28	6	10	16	18	—	—	—	—	—
2015–16	Djurgårdens IF	SHL	52	18	22	40	30	8	2	5	7	0
2016–17	Djurgårdens IF	SHL	50	18	16	34	16	3	0	0	0	0
2017–18	Skellefteå AIK	SHL	23	3	5	8	18	—	—	—	—	—
2018–19	Rögle BK	SHL	1	0	0	0	2	—	—	—	—	—
NHL totals			2	0	1	1	0	—	—	—	—	—
KHL totals			117	26	29	55	111	—	—	—	—	—
SHL totals			126	39	43	82	66	11	2	5	7	0
