= M3 Technology =

Electronics organisation

- Company type: Private
- Industry: Aerospace, Defense, Electronics, Automotive
- Founded: 1998 as J&K Electronics Inc.
- Headquarters: Headquarters in Yaphank, NY.
- Key people: Janine Massa - President Ken Massa - CEO; Mike Caton - COO Paul Palumbo - CFO
- Revenue: ▲$20 million USD (2019).
- Owner: Janine Massa
- Number of employees: 20
- Website: www.m3-tec.com

M3 Technology was founded as J&K Electronics Inc in 1998 as a distributor of electronic components on Long Island. In 2004, the company was renamed M3 Technology and established a new focus. The supply of parts and components to the aerospace industry.

M3 Technology is an aerospace and defense company that also operates in the electronics industry.

Among the projects the company works on is the supply of parts and components to the MRAP program, logistical support of the New Iraqi Air Force and global supply services for the armed forces of Taiwan and Japan. M3 Technology is a supplier to defense contractors in Turkey.

The company provides components for platforms including:

- Bradley Fighting Vehicle
- Bell Huey
- Mil Mi-17
- F-35 Lightning II
- M1 Abrams
- B-52 Stratofortress
- Orion spacecraft

M3 Technology is certified to the AS 9120 International Standard for Quality Management. The certification is based on the ISO 9001 standard. In June 2011, the company received certification to the ANSI-ESD S20.20 Standard from QMI-SAI Global.

- The company is registered as both an Exporter and a broker of United States Munitions List items through the United States Department of State and The Department of Defense Trade Controls.

== Leadership ==
- Janine Massa, President
- Ken Massa, CEO
- Mike Caton, COO
- Paul Palumbo, CFO

== M3 Race Team ==
M3 Technology operates a racing team. Led by driver Justin Bonsignore, the team competes in the NASCAR Whelen Modified Tour.

In 2010, team driver Justin Bonsignore received the Sunoco Rookie of the Year award.
