= Sean Henry (administrator) =

American ice hockey executive

CEO of the Nashville Predators, Bridgestone Arena, The Nashville Predators Foundation and SS&E
- Incumbent
- Assumed office December 1, 2010
- Preceded by: Jeff Cogen

President and Alternate Governor of the Nashville Predators
- In office September 7, 2010 – July 14, 2023
- Succeeded by: Michelle Kennedy

Interim CEO of the Tampa Bay Lightning
- In office January 2009-September 2010

COO of the Tampa Bay Lightning
- In office May 1999-December 2008

SVP of Sales & Marketing Unity Motion
- In office July 1997-April 1999

General Manager Volume Services
- In office April 1989-July 1997
- Preceded by: Joe Ambrose
- Succeeded by: Eric Wooden

Personal details
- Born: 1968 (age 57–58) Long Island, New York, USA
- Spouse: Tracey Manning
- Children: 4 Steven, Matthew, Amy and Jessie
- Education: State University of New York

Sean Henry (born 1968 on Long Island) is the Chief Executive Officer (CEO) of the National Hockey League's Nashville Predators.

== Biography ==
Henry worked his way up from the concession stands at Jones Beach State Parks to executive-level positions within the NHL. In May 1999, he became the COO of the Tampa Bay Lightning, a role he held permanently until December 2008 and on a consulting basis from January 2009 to August 2010. In 2004, the Lightning won the Stanley Cup against the Calgary Flames and Henry was among those who had their name engraved on the Cup. He joined the Nashville Predators franchise in 2010, assuming his role of President and Alternate Governor on September 7 of that year. Michelle Kennedy became the new President and Alternate Governor on July 14, 2023, allowing Henry to focus on his role as CEO and the organization's growing sports and entertainment portfolio.

A Long Island native, Henry attended the State University of New York for his Bachelor's degree. He is the uncle of M3 Technology's COO Michael Caton. Henry and wife Tracey live in Franklin, Tennessee, have four children, and one grand daughter. They are active in their children's schools, activities and countless charities; The Weaver Center, The YWCA, Monroe Carrell Jr. Children's Hospital at Vanderbilt, College scholarships, Wings of Liberty among countless other initiatives.
