= Jeff Cogen (sports executive) =

American sports executive

- Born: United States
- Occupation: CBO
- Years active: 2015 - 2018
- Employer: Tampa Bay Rays
- Organization: Major League Baseball
- Spouse: Jill
- Children: 3

Jeff Cogen is a former American sports executive. He was the chief executive officer of the Nashville Predators of the National Hockey League (NHL) before taking a position with the Tampa Bay Rays in the Major League Baseball (MLB).

== Career ==
From 2001 until 2004, Cogen served as the Florida Panthers chief operating officer. He then spent three years as president of the Texas Rangers before joining the Dallas Stars as their president. In 2010, Cogen left the Stars to serve as CEO for the Nashville Predators. In 2015, Cogen left the Predators to take up a position with the Tampa Bay Rays in the Major League Baseball (MLB).
