= 2020 Chicago White Sox season =

2020 Chicago White Sox
- American League Wild Card
- League: American League
- Division: Central
- Ballpark: Guaranteed Rate Field
- City: Chicago
- Record: 35–25 (.583)
- Divisional place: 3rd
- Owners: Jerry Reinsdorf
- General managers: Rick Hahn
- Managers: Rick Renteria
- Television: NBC Sports Chicago; NBC Sports Chicago+ (Jason Benetti, Steve Stone, Tom Paciorek, Tony Graffanino)
- Radio: WGN-AM; Chicago White Sox Radio Network (Andy Masur, Darrin Jackson); WRTO-AM (Spanish) (Hector Molina, Billy Russo)
- Stats: ESPN.com; Baseball Reference

The 2020 season was the Chicago White Sox' 121st season in Chicago and 120th in the American League. The Sox played their home games at Guaranteed Rate Field.

On March 12, 2020, MLB announced that because of the ongoing COVID-19 pandemic, the start of the regular season would be delayed by at least two weeks in addition to the remainder of spring training being cancelled. Four days later, it was announced that the start of the season would be pushed back indefinitely due to the recommendation made by the CDC to restrict events of more than 50 people for eight weeks. On June 23, commissioner Rob Manfred unilaterally implemented a 60-game season. Players reported to training camps on July 1 in order to resume spring training and prepare for a July 24 Opening Day.

Due to the pandemic and the shortened season, Major League Baseball instituted certain rule changes which included the use of a universal designated hitter, a runner on second base to start extra innings, and a revised schedule. On July 30, the league and the union agreed that all remaining doubleheaders on the season would be seven innings.

On April 1, 2020, longtime White Sox radio broadcaster Ed Farmer died at the age of 70.

On September 17, with a win against the Minnesota Twins, the White Sox clinched their first playoff spot since 2008. This was their first winning season since 2012. They lost in three games to the Oakland Athletics in the 2020 American League Wild Card Series.

== Offseason ==
=== Rule changes ===
For the 2020 season, MLB instituted several new rule changes including the following:

- Single trade deadline – there will no longer be a waiver trade deadline later in the year.
- 26-man roster – rosters will expand from 25 players, but no team may carry more than 13 pitchers.
- Three-batter minimum for pitchers - a pitcher must face three batters in a game before they can be removed unless there is an injury or the end of an inning.

Further rule changes came into effect in response to the COVID-19 pandemic including the use of the DH in the National League, a shortened schedule, and starting extra innings with a runner at second base.

=== Transactions ===
- November 21, 2019: Catcher Yasmani Grandal signed as a free agent by the White Sox to a four-year, $73 million contract.
- November 22, 2019: 1st Baseman José Abreu signed a three-year contract extension worth $50 million with the White Sox.
- December 2, 2019: Catcher James McCann signed a one-year extension with the White Sox.
- December 10, 2019: White Sox trade outfielder Steele Walker to the Texas Rangers for outfielder Nomar Mazara.
- December 20, 2019: LHP Gio González signed as a free agent by the White Sox to a one-year, $5 million contract.
- December 30, 2019: LHP Dallas Keuchel signed as a free agent by the White Sox to a three-year, $55.5 million contract.
- January 2, 2020: Outfielder Luis Robert signed a six-year contract extension worth $50 million with the White Sox.
- January 9, 2020: 1B-DH Edwin Encarnación signed as a free agent by the White Sox to a one-year, $12 million contract.
- January 14, 2020: RHP Steve Cishek signed as a free agent by the White Sox to a one-year, $6 million contract.

== Regular season ==
On August 13, the White Sox were supposed to play the first ever MLB at Field of Dreams game against the New York Yankees at a temporary 8,000 seat ballpark in Dyersville, Iowa before the pandemic came. MLB then announced the shortened season and that the AL and NL will play against each other in the same division which took the Yankees off the matchup. Then on July 1, MLB announced that the St. Louis Cardinals would replace the Yankees for the game. Then in late July, a majority of Cardinals players and coaches tested positive for COVID-19. The MLB announced on August 3 that the Field of Dreams game would be rescheduled to August 12, 2021.

=== Game log ===
2020 regular season game log: 35–25 (Home: 18–12; Away: 17–13)
July: 3–4 (Home: 1–2; Away: 2–2)

#	Date	Opponent	Time (CT)	Score	Win	Loss	Save	Record	Streak
1	July 24	Twins	7:10 pm	5–10	May (1–0)	**Giolito** (0–1)	—	0–1	L1
2	July 25	Twins	1:10 pm	10–3	**Keuchel** (1–0)	Dobnak (0–1)	—	1–1	W1
3	July 26	Twins	1:10 pm	2–14	Maeda (1–0)	**López** (0–1)	—	1–2	L1
—	July 27	@ Indians	Postponed (inclement weather)						
4	July 28	@ Indians	3:40 pm	3–4	Civale (1–0)	**Cease** (0–1)	Hand (2)	1–3	L2
5	July 28	@ Indians	TBA	3–5	Plutko (1–0)	**Rodón** (0–1)	Hill (1)	1–4	L3
6	July 29	@ Indians	5:10 pm	4–0	**Bummer** (1–0)	Hand (0–1)	—	2–4	W1
7	July 31	@ Royals	7:05 pm	3–2	**Keuchel** (2–0)	Bubic (0–1)	**Colomé** (1)	3–4	W2

August: 19–9 (Home: 10–7; Away: 9–2)

#	Date	Opponent	Time (CT)	Score	Win	Loss	Save	Record	Streak
8	August 1	@ Royals	6:05 pm	11–5	**Foster** (1–0)	Bolaños (0–2)	**Heuer** (1)	4–4	W3
9	August 2	@ Royals	1:05 pm	9–2	**Cease** (1–1)	Barlow (1–1)	—	5–4	W4
10	August 3	@ Brewers	7:10 pm	6–4	**Detwiler** (1–0)	Phelps (1–1)	**Colomé** (2)	6–4	W5
11	August 4	@ Brewers	7:10 pm	3–2	**Giolito** (1–1)	Williams (0–1)	**Colomé** (3)	7–4	W6
12	August 5	Brewers	7:10 pm	0–1	Houser (1–0)	**Keuchel** (2–1)	Hader (2)	7–5	L1
13	August 6	Brewers	7:10 pm	3–8	Lindblom (1–0)	**González** (0–1)	—	7–6	L2
14	August 7	Indians	7:10 pm	2–0	**Cease** (2–1)	Civale (1–2)	**Colomé** (4)	8–6	W1
15	August 8	Indians	1:10 pm	1–7	Plesac (1–1)	**Anderson** (0–1)	—	8–7	L1
16	August 9	Indians	1:10 pm	4–5 (10)	Maton (1–0)	**Cordero** (0–1)	Pérez (1)	8–8	L2
17	August 10	@ Tigers	6:10 pm	1–5	Norris (1–1)	**Keuchel** (2–2)	—	8–9	L3
18	August 11	@ Tigers	6:10 pm	8–4	**Foster** (2–0)	Alexander (1–1)	—	9–9	W1
19	August 12	@ Tigers	12:10 pm	7–5	**Cease** (3–1)	Boyd (0–2)	**Colomé** (5)	10–9	W2
20	August 15	Cardinals	1:10 pm	1–5	Wainwright (2–0)	**Giolito** (1–2)	—	10–10	L1
21	August 15	Cardinals	3:15 pm	3–6	Cabrera (1–0)	**Marshall** (0–1)	Miller (1)	10–11	L2
22	August 16	Cardinals	1:10 pm	7–2	**Keuchel** (3–2)	Hudson (0–2)	—	11–11	W1
23	August 17	Tigers	7:10 pm	7–2	**Heuer** (1–0)	Boyd (0–3)	—	12–11	W2
24	August 18	Tigers	7:10 pm	10–4	**Cease** (4–1)	Skubal (0–1)	—	13–11	W3
25	August 19	Tigers	7:10 pm	5–3	**Marshall** (1–1)	Soto (0–1)	**Colomé** (6)	14–11	W4
26	August 20	Tigers	1:10 pm	9–0	**Giolito** (2–2)	Turnbull (2–2)	—	15–11	W5
27	August 21	@ Cubs	7:15 pm	10–1	**Keuchel** (4–2)	Lester (2–1)	—	16–11	W6
28	August 22	@ Cubs	7:15 pm	7–4	**González** (1–1)	Hendricks (3–3)	—	17–11	W7
29	August 23	@ Cubs	1:20 pm	1–2	Darvish (5–1)	**Cease** (4–2)	Jeffress (3)	17–12	L1
30	August 25	Pirates	7:10 pm	4–0	**Giolito** (3–2)	Brault (0–1)	—	18–12	W1
31	August 26	Pirates	1:10 pm	10–3	**Keuchel** (2–0)	Williams (1–5)	—	19–12	W2
32	August 28	Royals	7:10 pm	6–5	**Colomé** (1–0)	Kennedy (0–2)	—	20–12	W3
33	August 29	Royals	1:10 pm	6–9	Newberry (1–0)	**Burdi** (0–1)	Hahn (1)	20–13	L1
34	August 30	Royals	1:10 pm	5–2 (10)	**Foster** (3–0)	Zuber (1–2)	—	21–13	W1
35	August 31	@ Twins	7:10 pm	8–5	**Foster** (4–0)	Rogers (1–3)	**Colomé** (7)	22–13	W2

September: 13–12 (Home: 7–3; Away: 6–9)

#	Date	Opponent	Time (CT)	Score	Win	Loss	Save	Record	Streak
36	September 1	@ Twins	7:10 pm	2–3	Thielbar (1–0)	**Cordero** (0–2)	Wisler (1)	22–14	L1
37	September 2	@ Twins	7:10 pm	1–8	Berríos (3–3)	**López** (0–2)	—	22–15	L2
38	September 3	@ Royals	7:05 pm	11–6	**Cease** (5–2)	Duffy (2–3)	—	23–15	W1
39	September 4	@ Royals	7:05 pm	7–4	**Heuer** (2–0)	Singer (1–4)	**Colomé** (8)	24–15	W2
40	September 5	@ Royals	6:05 pm	5–3	**Giolito** (4–2)	Bubic (0–5)	**Colomé** (9)	25–15	W3
41	September 6	@ Royals	1:05 pm	8–2	**Keuchel** (6–2)	Harvey (0–3)	—	26–15	W4
42	September 8	@ Pirates	6:05 pm	4–5	Rodríguez (2–2)	**Detwiler** (1–1)	—	26–16	L1
43	September 9	@ Pirates	6:05 pm	8–1	**Dunning** (1–0)	Brubaker (1–1)	—	27–16	W1
44	September 11	Tigers	7:10 pm	4–3	**Marshall** (2–1)	Cisnero (2–3)	**Colomé** (10)	28–16	W2
45	September 12	Tigers	6:10 pm	14–0	**López** (1–2)	Fulmer (0–2)	—	29–16	W3
46	September 13	Tigers	1:10 pm	5–2	**Cordero** (1–2)	Turnbull (4–3)	**Colomé** (11)	30–16	W4
47	September 14	Twins	7:10 pm	3–1	**Colomé** (2–0)	Rogers (1–4)	—	31–16	W5
48	September 15	Twins	7:10 pm	6–2	**Dunning** (2–0)	Dobnak (6–4)	—	32–16	W6
49	September 16	Twins	7:10 pm	1–5	Stashak (1–0)	**Giolito** (4–3)	—	32–17	L1
50	September 17	Twins	1:10 pm	4–3	**Heuer** (3–0)	Clippard (1–1)	**Colomé** (12)	33–17	W1
51	September 18	@ Reds	6:10 pm	1–7	Mahle (2–2)	**Stiever** (0–1)	—	33–18	L1
52	September 19	@ Reds	5:10 pm	5–0	**Foster** (5–0)	Bauer (4–4)	—	34–18	W1
53	September 20	@ Reds	12:10 pm	3–7	Sims (3–0)	**Cease** (5–3)	—	34–19	L1
54	September 21	@ Indians	5:10 pm	4–7	Civale (4–5)	**Fry** (0–1)	Hand (14)	34–20	L2
55	September 22	@ Indians	5:10 pm	3–5 (10)	Maton (3–3)	**Foster** (5–1)	—	34–21	L3
56	September 23	@ Indians	5:10 pm	2–3	Hand (2–1)	**González** (1–2)	—	34–22	L4
57	September 24	@ Indians	5:10 pm	4–5	Hill (2–0)	**Rodón** (0–2)	Hand (15)	34–23	L5
58	September 25	Cubs	7:10 pm	0–10	Darvish (8–3)	**Cease** (5–4)	—	34–24	L6
59	September 26	Cubs	6:10 pm	9–5	**Foster** (6–1)	Lester (3–3)	—	35–24	W1
60	September 27	Cubs	2:10 pm	8–10	Alzolay (1–1)	**López** (1–3)	Chafin (1)	35–25	L1

Legend: = Win = Loss = Postponement
Bold = White Sox team member

=== Season standings ===
==== American League Central ====
AL Central
Team	W	L	Pct.	GB	Home	Road
Minnesota Twins	36	24	.600	—	24‍–‍7	12‍–‍17
Cleveland Indians	35	25	.583	1	18‍–‍12	17‍–‍13
Chicago White Sox	35	25	.583	1	18‍–‍12	17‍–‍13
Kansas City Royals	26	34	.433	10	15‍–‍15	11‍–‍19
Detroit Tigers	23	35	.397	12	12‍–‍15	11‍–‍20

==== American League Wild Card ====
Division leaders
Team	W	L	Pct.
Tampa Bay Rays	40	20	.667
Oakland Athletics	36	24	.600
Minnesota Twins	36	24	.600

Division 2nd place
Team	W	L	Pct.
Cleveland Indians	35	25	.583
New York Yankees	33	27	.550
Houston Astros	29	31	.483

Wild Card teams (Top 2 teams qualify for postseason)
Team	W	L	Pct.	GB
Chicago White Sox	35	25	.583	+3
Toronto Blue Jays	32	28	.533	—
Seattle Mariners	27	33	.450	5
Los Angeles Angels	26	34	.433	6
Kansas City Royals	26	34	.433	6
Baltimore Orioles	25	35	.417	7
Boston Red Sox	24	36	.400	8
Detroit Tigers	23	35	.397	8
Texas Rangers	22	38	.367	10

=== Record against opponents ===
2020 American League record Source: MLB Standings Grid – 2020
Team	**CWS**	**CLE**	**DET**	**KC**	**MIN**	NL
Chicago	—	2–8	9–1	9–1	5–5	10–10
Cleveland	8–2	—	7–3	5–5	3–7	12–8
Detroit	1–9	3–7	—	4–6	4–6	11–7
Kansas City	1–9	5–5	6–4	—	5–5	9–11
Minnesota	5–5	7–3	6–4	5–5	—	13–7

=== Detailed records ===
**American League Central**
Opponent	Total	Home	Away	RS	RA
**Chicago White Sox**	–	–	–	–	–
Cleveland Indians	2–8	1–2	1–6	30	41
Detroit Tigers	9–1	7–0	2–1	70	28
Kansas City Royals	9–1	2–1	7–0	71	40
Minnesota Twins	5–5	4–3	1–2	42	54
Total	25–15	14–6	11–9	212	163

**National League Central**
Opponent	Total	Home	Away	RS	RA
Chicago Cubs	3–3	1–2	2–1	35	32
Cincinnati Reds	1–2	–	1–2	9	14
Milwaukee Brewers	2–2	0–2	2–0	12	15
Pittsburgh Pirates	3–1	2–0	1–1	26	9
St. Louis Cardinals	1–2	1–2	–	11	13
Total	10–10	4–6	6–4	93	83

=== Achievements ===
- In the fifth inning of their August 16 game against the St. Louis Cardinals, the White Sox hit four consecutive home runs (Yoan Moncada, Yasmani Grandal, Jose Abreu, and Eloy Jimenez), becoming the tenth team in major league history to do so and only the 2nd time it has happened in franchise history.
- On August 22 and 23, José Abreu tied an MLB record by hitting a home run in 4 straight at-bats against the Chicago Cubs. Abreu hit three Home Runs in his 3 at-bats on August 22 off of pitchers Kyle Hendricks, Rowan Wick, and Duane Underwood Jr. then hit a Home Run on his first at-bat off of Yu Darvish the following day.
- On August 25 against the Pittsburgh Pirates, pitcher Lucas Giolito recorded his first career no-hitter in a 4–0 win. It was the first no-hitter of the MLB season. Giolito struck out 13 batters and threw 74 of 101 pitches for strikes. His only blemish was a lead off walk to Erik González in the fourth inning. It was the first no-hitter for a Sox pitcher since Philip Humber pitched a perfect game in 2012 and the 19th in White Sox History.
- In August, the Sox set a new franchise record for most home runs in a month (52).
- The Sox became the first team in Major League history to go undefeated against left-handed pitching with a record of 14–0.
- The White Sox led the American League in home runs (96), slugging percentage (.453) and total bases (928).

== Postseason ==
=== Game log ===
2020 White Sox postseason game log
American League Wild Card Series (1–2) (best of 3)

#	Date	Opponent	Score	Win	Loss	Save	Time (CT)	Record	Box
1	September 29	@ Athletics	4–1	Giolito (1–0)	Luzardo (0–1)	Colomé (1)	2:00 pm	1–0	W1
2	September 30	@ Athletics	3–5	Bassitt (1–0)	Keuchel (0–1)	Diekman (1)	2:00 pm	1–1	L1
3	October 1	@ Athletics	4–6	Montas (1–0)	Marshall (0–1)	Hendriks (1)	2:00 pm	1–2	L1

=== Postseason rosters ===
Playoff rosters
American League Wild Card Series

- Pitchers: 27 Lucas Giolito 39 Aaron Bummer 43 Evan Marshall 45 Garrett Crochet 48 Álex Colomé 50 Jimmy Cordero 51 Dane Dunning 55 Carlos Rodón 57 Jace Fry 60 Dallas Keuchel 63 Matt Foster 65 Codi Heuer 84 Dylan Cease
- Catchers: 24 Yasmani Grandal 33 James McCann 38 Zack Collins
- Infielders: 1 Nick Madrigal 5 Yolmer Sánchez 7 Tim Anderson 10 Yoán Moncada 79 José Abreu
- Outfielders: 15 Adam Engel 28 Leury García 30 Nomar Mazara 32 Jarrod Dyson 74 Eloy Jiménez 88 Luis Robert
- Designated hitters: 23 Edwin Encarnación

== Roster ==
2020 Chicago White Sox
Roster
Pitchers: 53 Drew Anderson; 39 Aaron Bummer; 62 Zack Burdi; 84 Dylan Cease; 31 Steve Cishek; 48 Álex Colomé; 50 Jimmy Cordero; 45 Garrett Crochet; 54 Ross Detwiler; 51 Dane Dunning; 67 Bernardo Flores; 63 Matt Foster; 57 Jace Fry; 27 Lucas Giolito; 47 Gio González; 52 Ian Hamilton; 41 Kelvin Herrera; 65 Codi Heuer; 60 Dallas Keuchel; 67 Brady Lail; 58 Jimmy Lambert; 40 Reynaldo López; 43 Evan Marshall; 64 Alex McRae; 55 Carlos Rodon; 66 José Ruiz; 53 Jonathan Stiever	Catchers: 38 Zack Collins; 24 Yasmani Grandal; 33 James McCann; Infielders: 79 José Abreu; 7 Tim Anderson; 36 Cheslor Cuthbert; 28 Leury García; 18 Ryan Goins; 1 Nick Madrigal; 20 Danny Mendick; 10 Yoan Moncada; 5 Yolmer Sánchez	Outfielders: 26 Nicky Delmonico; 32 Jarrod Dyson; 15 Adam Engel; 37 Luis González; 74 Eloy Jiménez; 30 Nomar Mazara; 88 Luis Robert; Other batters: 23 Edwin Encarnación; 49 Yermín Mercedes	Manager: 17 Rick Renteria; Coaches: 8 Daryl Boston (first base); 12 Nick Capra (third base); 46 Scott Coolbaugh (assistant hitting); 21 Don Cooper (pitching); 98 Miguel González (bullpen catcher); 29 Curt Hasler (bullpen); 82 Joe McEwing (bench/infield); 22 Frank Menechino (hitting); 96 Luis Sierra (bullpen catcher)

== Player stats ==
=== Batting ===
Note: G = Games played; AB = At bats; R = Runs; H = Hits; 2B = Doubles; 3B = Triples; HR = Home runs; RBI = Runs batted in; SB = Stolen bases; BB = Walks; AVG = Batting average; SLG = Slugging average

Player	G	AB	R	H	2B	3B	HR	RBI	SB	BB	AVG	SLG
José Abreu	60	240	43	76	15	0	19	60	0	18	.317	.617
Eloy Jiménez	55	213	26	63	14	0	14	41	0	12	.296	.559
Tim Anderson	49	208	45	67	11	1	10	21	5	10	.322	.529
Luis Robert Jr.	56	202	33	47	8	0	11	31	9	20	.233	.436
Yoán Moncada	52	200	28	45	8	3	6	24	0	28	.225	.385
Yasmani Grandal	46	161	27	37	7	0	8	27	0	30	.230	.422
Edwin Encarnación	44	159	19	25	5	0	10	19	0	16	.157	.377
Nomar Mazara	42	136	13	31	6	0	1	15	0	10	.228	.294
Danny Mendick	33	107	11	26	4	1	3	6	0	6	.243	.383
Nick Madrigal	29	103	8	35	3	0	0	11	2	4	.340	.369
James McCann	31	97	20	28	3	0	7	15	1	8	.289	.536
Adam Engel	36	88	11	26	5	1	3	12	1	3	.295	.477
Leury García	16	59	6	16	1	0	3	8	0	4	.271	.441
Nicky Delmonico	6	20	0	3	0	0	0	3	0	2	.150	.150
Yolmer Sánchez	11	16	7	5	3	0	1	1	0	5	.313	.688
Zack Collins	9	16	1	1	1	0	0	0	0	2	.063	.125
Jarrod Dyson	11	10	3	3	0	0	0	0	2	0	.300	.300
Ryan Goins	14	9	4	0	0	0	0	0	0	1	.000	.000
Luis González	3	1	1	0	0	0	0	0	0	0	.000	.000
Yermín Mercedes	1	1	0	0	0	0	0	0	0	0	.000	.000
Cheslor Cuthbert	1	1	0	0	0	0	0	0	0	0	.000	.000
Team totals	60	2047	306	534	94	6	96	294	20	179	.261	.453

=== Pitching ===
Note: W = Wins; L = Losses; ERA = Earned run average; G = Games pitched; GS = Games started; SV = Saves; IP = Innings pitched; H = Hits allowed; R = Runs allowed; ER = Earned runs allowed; BB = Walks allowed; SO = Strikeouts

Player	W	L	ERA	G	GS	SV	IP	H	R	ER	BB	SO
Lucas Giolito	4	3	3.48	12	12	0	72.1	47	31	28	28	97
Dallas Keuchel	6	2	1.99	11	11	0	63.1	52	15	14	17	42
Dylan Cease	5	4	4.01	12	12	0	58.1	50	30	26	34	44
Dane Dunning	2	0	3.97	7	7	0	34.0	25	17	15	13	35
Gio González	1	2	4.83	12	4	0	31.2	40	19	17	19	34
Matt Foster	6	1	2.20	23	2	0	28.2	16	8	7	9	31
Jimmy Cordero	1	2	6.08	30	0	0	26.2	33	21	18	9	22
Reynaldo López	1	3	6.49	8	8	0	26.1	28	21	19	15	24
Codi Heuer	3	0	1.52	21	0	1	23.2	12	4	4	9	25
Evan Marshall	2	1	2.38	23	0	0	22.2	17	6	6	7	30
Alex Colomé	2	0	0.81	21	0	12	22.1	13	3	2	8	16
Steve Cishek	0	0	5.40	22	0	0	20.0	21	12	12	9	21
Ross Detwiler	1	1	3.20	16	0	0	19.2	19	8	7	5	15
Jace Fry	0	1	3.66	18	0	0	19.2	16	9	8	12	24
Aaron Bummer	1	0	0.96	9	0	0	9.1	5	1	1	5	14
Carlos Rodón	0	2	8.22	4	2	0	7.2	9	7	7	3	6
Zack Burdi	0	1	11.05	8	0	0	7.1	11	11	9	3	11
Jonathan Stiever	0	1	9.95	2	2	0	6.1	7	7	7	4	3
Garrett Crochet	0	0	0.00	5	0	0	6.0	3	0	0	0	8
Ian Hamilton	0	0	4.50	4	0	0	4.0	4	2	2	5	4
José Ruiz	0	0	2.25	5	0	0	4.0	2	1	1	0	5
Alex McRae	0	0	0.00	2	0	0	3.0	1	0	0	0	2
Kelvin Herrera	0	0	15.43	2	0	0	2.1	3	4	4	1	3
Jimmy Lambert	0	0	0.00	2	0	0	2.0	2	0	0	0	2
Bernardo Flores Jr.	0	0	9.00	2	0	0	2.0	4	2	2	0	2
Drew Anderson	0	1	40.50	1	0	0	1.1	4	6	6	2	2
Brady Lail	0	0	0.00	1	0	0	1.1	2	0	0	0	1
Yolmer Sánchez	0	0	9.00	1	0	0	1.0	2	1	1	0	0
Team totals	35	25	3.81	60	60	13	527.0	448	246	223	217	523

== Awards and honors ==
José Abreu won the American League Player of the Month for July/August.

Luis Robert won the American League Rookie of the Month for July/August. Robert also won the American League Gold Glove for Center field becoming the second rookie in White Sox history to do so.

The White Sox had 3 players winning the Silver Slugger Award with Abreu winning his 3rd and Tim Anderson and Eloy Jiménez winning their first.

Abreu also won his first AL MVP Award becoming the 4th player in White Sox history to do so joining Nellie Fox (1959), Dick Allen (1972), and Frank Thomas (1993–94). Abreu in 2020 batted .317 with an OBP of .370 and lead the AL in Slugging percentage at .617 and hit 19 homers on the year. Abreu also lead the MLB with 60 RBIs and 148 total bases. Abreu also won the Hank Aaron Award, the Sporting News Player of the Year Award, and the All-MLB Second Team for first base.

White Sox General Manager Rick Hahn won the Sporting News Executive of the Year Award for 2020 becoming the third White Sox Executive to win the award joining Roland Hemond (1972) and Bill Veeck (1977).

== Farm system ==
Level	Team	League	Manager
AAA	Charlotte Knights	International League	
AA	Birmingham Barons	Southern League	
A-Advanced	Winston-Salem Dash	Carolina League	
A	Kannapolis Cannon Ballers	South Atlantic League	
Rookie	Great Falls Voyagers	Pioneer League	
Rookie	AZL White Sox	Arizona League	
Rookie	DSL White Sox	Dominican Summer League	
