= Zack Burdi =

American baseball player (born 1995)

- Pitcher
- Born: March 9, 1995 (age 31); Downers Grove, Illinois, U.S.
- Batted: Right Threw: Right

MLB debut
- August 8, 2020, for the Chicago White Sox

Last MLB appearance
- May 23, 2023, for the Tampa Bay Rays

MLB statistics
- Win–loss record: 0–1
- Earned run average: 8.44
- Strikeouts: 23
- Stats at Baseball Reference

Teams
- Chicago White Sox (2020–2021); Baltimore Orioles (2021); Tampa Bay Rays (2023)

Zachary M. Burdi (/ˈbɜːrdiː/ BUR-dee; born March 9, 1995) is an American former professional baseball pitcher. He played in Major League Baseball (MLB) for the Chicago White Sox, Baltimore Orioles, and Tampa Bay Rays.

== Career ==
=== Amateur career ===
Burdi attended Downers Grove South High School in Downers Grove, Illinois, where he played for the school's baseball team as a pitcher. He then enrolled at the University of Louisville, where he played college baseball for the Louisville Cardinals. In 2014, he played collegiate summer baseball with the Chatham Anglers of the Cape Cod Baseball League.

=== Chicago White Sox ===
The Chicago White Sox selected Burdi as the 26th pick in the first round of the 2016 Major League Baseball draft. After he signed with the White Sox, Burdi made one appearance with the Arizona White Sox of the Rookie-level Arizona League, four appearances with the Winston-Salem Dash of the High-A Carolina League, 12 appearances for the Birmingham Barons of the Double-A Southern League, and was then promoted to the Charlotte Knights of the Triple-A International League. He finished his first professional season with a 1–0 record and a 3.32 ERA, with 51 strikeouts in 38 innings pitched between the four clubs. Burdi spent all of 2017 with Charlotte, posting an 0–4 record with a 4.05 ERA.

In 2018, Burdi made 7 appearances for the AZL White Sox, posting a 2.84 ERA with 7 strikeouts across 6 1/3 innings pitched. He split the 2019 campaign between Birmingham and the Single-A Kannapolis Intimidators, accumulating a 1–4 record and 6.75 ERA with 30 strikeouts and 3 saves over 22 2/3 innings of work. The White Sox added Burdi to their 40-man roster following the season to protect him from the Rule 5 draft.

On August 8, 2020, Burdi was called up to the major leagues and made his major league debut that night, pitching a scoreless inning against the Cleveland Indians. With the 2020 Chicago White Sox, Burdi appeared in 8 games, compiling a 0–1 record with 11.05 ERA and 11 strikeouts in 17 1/3 innings pitched.

Burdi appeared in 6 games for the White Sox in 2021, posting an ERA of 6.00 with 6 strikeouts over 9 innings. On August 16, 2021, Burdi was designated for assignment by the White Sox.

=== Baltimore Orioles ===
On August 18, 2021, Burdi was claimed off of waivers by the Baltimore Orioles. He was assigned to the Triple-A Norfolk Tides. Burdi logged one scoreless appearance for Baltimore and posted a 2.25 ERA in 4 games for Norfolk to round out the year.

=== Washington Nationals ===
On October 15, 2021, Burdi was claimed off of waivers by the Arizona Diamondbacks. He was released on March 14, 2022.

On April 21, 2022, Burdi signed a minor league contract with the Washington Nationals. Burdi appeared in only eight games for the High-A Wilmington Blue Rocks, recording a 1.74 ERA with 10 strikeouts in 10 1/3 innings of work, making two scoreless appearances for the rookie-level Florida Complex League Nationals as well. He elected free agency following the season on November 10.

=== Tampa Bay Rays ===
On January 18, 2023, Burdi signed a minor league contract with the Tampa Bay Rays organization. He began the year with the Triple-A Durham Bulls, posting a 6.75 ERA with a 7:7 K:BB across 6 games. On April 26, Burdi had his contract selected to the active roster. He made two scoreless appearances for the Rays before being designated for assignment on May 3. He cleared waivers and was sent outright to Triple-A Durham on May 7.

On May 17, Burdi was selected back to the major league roster after Yonny Chirinos was optioned to Triple-A. After allowing 6 runs (5 earned) in an appearance against the Toronto Blue Jays, Burdi was again designated for assignment the following day on May 24.

=== Los Angeles Dodgers ===
On May 26, 2023, Burdi was claimed off waivers by the Los Angeles Dodgers. He was assigned to the Triple-A Oklahoma City Dodgers, where he made one appearance before he was designated for assignment on June 1. He cleared waivers and was sent outright to Triple–A on June 6. He pitched in three more games after being outrighted, with 4 2/3 scoreless innings overall. He elected free agency on October 13.

On April 1, 2025, Burdi announced his retirement from professional baseball.

== Personal life ==
His older brother, Nick Burdi, also pitched in Major League Baseball from 2018 to 2025.
