= Adam Engel =

American baseball player (born 1991)

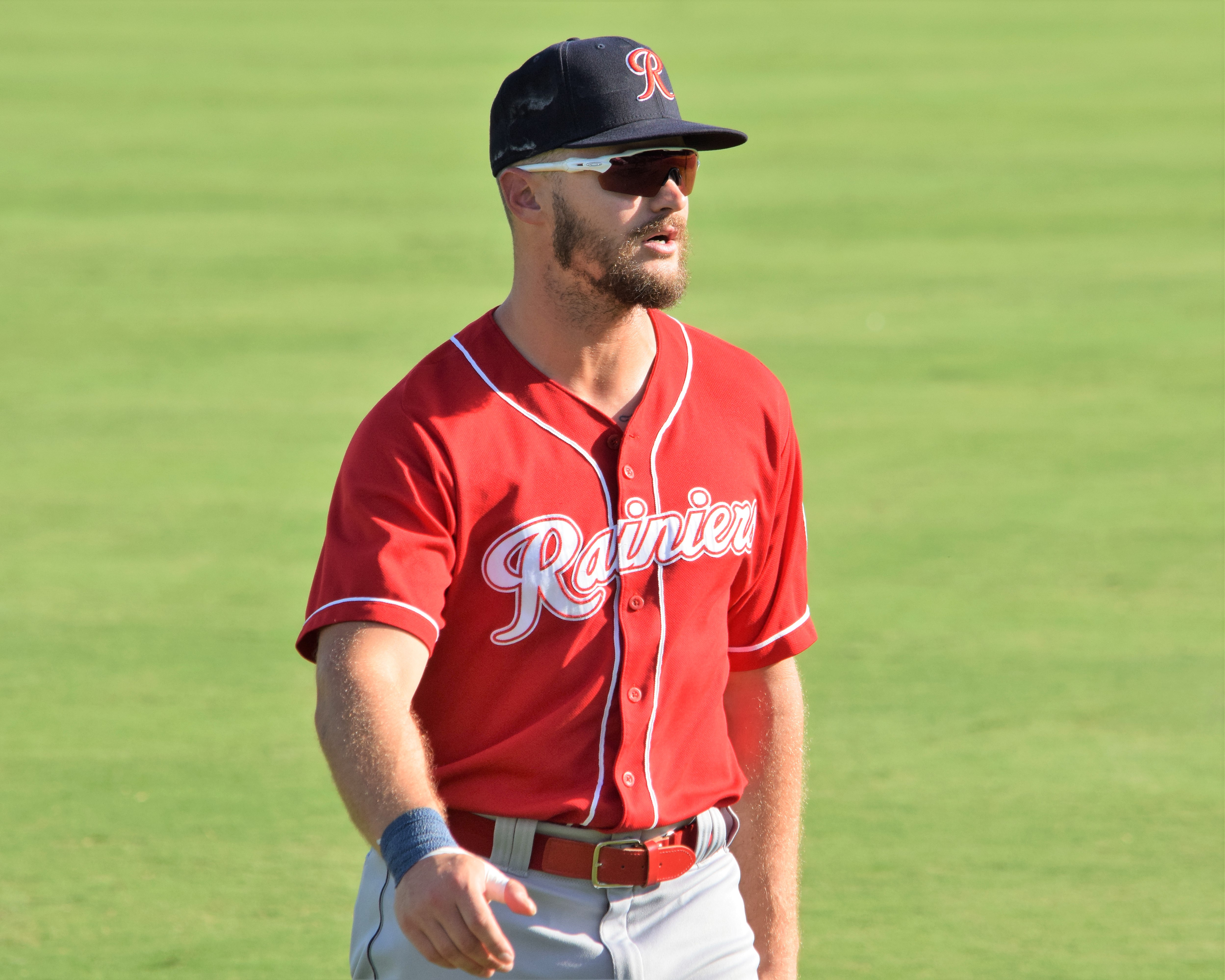
- Engel with the Tacoma Rainiers in 2023
- Center fielder
- Born: December 9, 1991 (age 34); Cincinnati, Ohio, U.S.
- Batted: Right Threw: Right

MLB debut
- May 27, 2017, for the Chicago White Sox

Last MLB appearance
- May 19, 2023, for the San Diego Padres

MLB statistics
- Batting average: .224
- Home runs: 30
- Runs batted in: 123
- Stats at Baseball Reference

Teams
- Chicago White Sox (2017–2022); San Diego Padres (2023)

Adam Trevor Engel (born December 9, 1991) is an American former professional baseball center fielder. He played in Major League Baseball (MLB) for the Chicago White Sox and San Diego Padres. He was drafted by the White Sox in the 19th round of the 2013 MLB draft, and made his MLB debut with them in 2017.

== Amateur career ==
Engel attended Loveland High School in Loveland, Ohio, and played college baseball at the University of Louisville. After the 2012 season, he played collegiate summer baseball with the Chatham Anglers of the Cape Cod Baseball League. After his junior year, he was drafted by the Chicago White Sox in the 19th round of the 2013 Major League Baseball draft.

== Professional career ==
=== Chicago White Sox ===
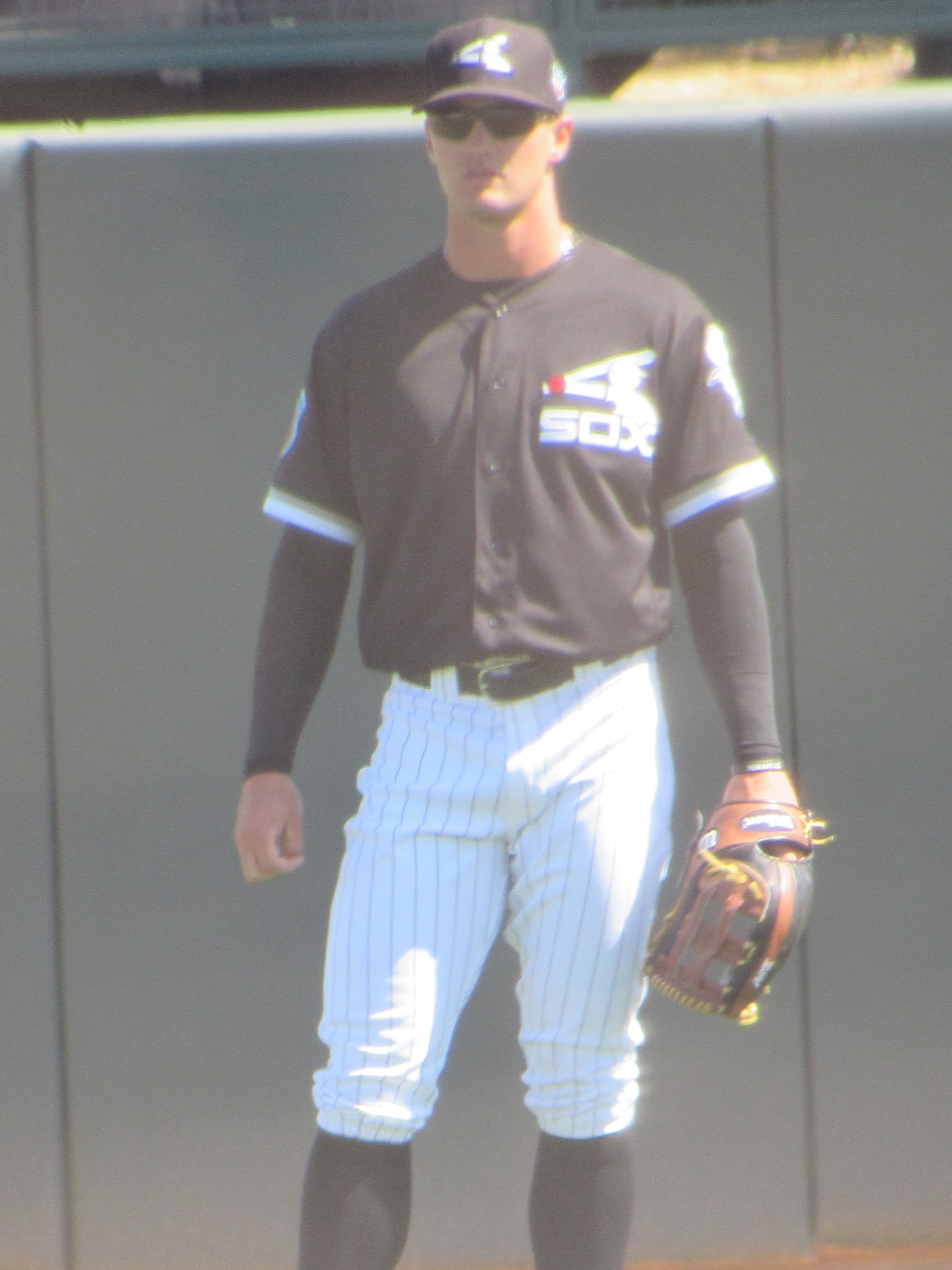
Engel with the 2016 Chicago White Sox

He signed with the White Sox and made his professional debut in 2013, with the Great Falls Voyagers, batting .301/.379/.414 with 31 stolen bases. He spent 2014 with the Arizona League White Sox, Kannapolis Intimidators and Winston-Salem Dash. After the season, he played in the Australian Baseball League for the Melbourne Aces, batting a combined .264/.335/.400 with 39 stolen bases.

Engel played for Winston-Salem in 2015, batting .251/.335/.369 with 65 stolen bases, for whom he as a Post-Season Carolina League All Star, and in the Arizona Fall League after the season. He was named the MVP of the Arizona Fall League after leading the league with a .403 batting average with 10 stolen bases.

In 2016, he played for three minor league teams, hitting a combined .259/.344/.406 with 45 stolen bases in 510 at bats. The White Sox added him to their 40-man roster after the 2016 season.

On May 27, 2017, Engel was recalled from Triple-A Charlotte Knights and made his Major League debut the same day recording his first MLB hit in his third at bat against the Detroit Tigers. In the majors, he batted .166/.235/.282 with 8 stolen bases in 301 at bats. He had the lowest batting average against right-handers among all MLB hitters (140 or more plate appearances), at .147.

On the week from August 6–12, 2018, Engel robbed 3 home runs from batters all in one week at Guaranteed Rate Field. He robbed Yankees batters Greg Bird on August 6 and Kyle Higashioka the next day. Then he robbed Indians batter Yonder Alonso on August 12. In 2018, he batted .235/.279/.336 with 16 stolen bases in 429 at bats. He had the lowest fielding percentage among major league center fielders, at .981.

Overall with the 2020 Chicago White Sox, Engel batted .295 with three home runs and 12 RBIs in 36 games.

In 2020, Engel was added to the White Sox' postseason roster. He made his postseason debut against the Oakland Athletics in game 1 of the Wild Card Series. He homered in his first postseason at bat off of Jesús Luzardo. In 2021, Engel started the year on the IL with a hamstring injury. He was activated and made his 2021 season debut on June 6 against the Detroit Tigers and even robbed a Home Run from Niko Goodrum in that same game. Overall, Engel hit .252 in 39 games hitting seven home runs and 18 RBIs.

On November 18, 2022, Engel was non-tendered by the White Sox and became a free agent.

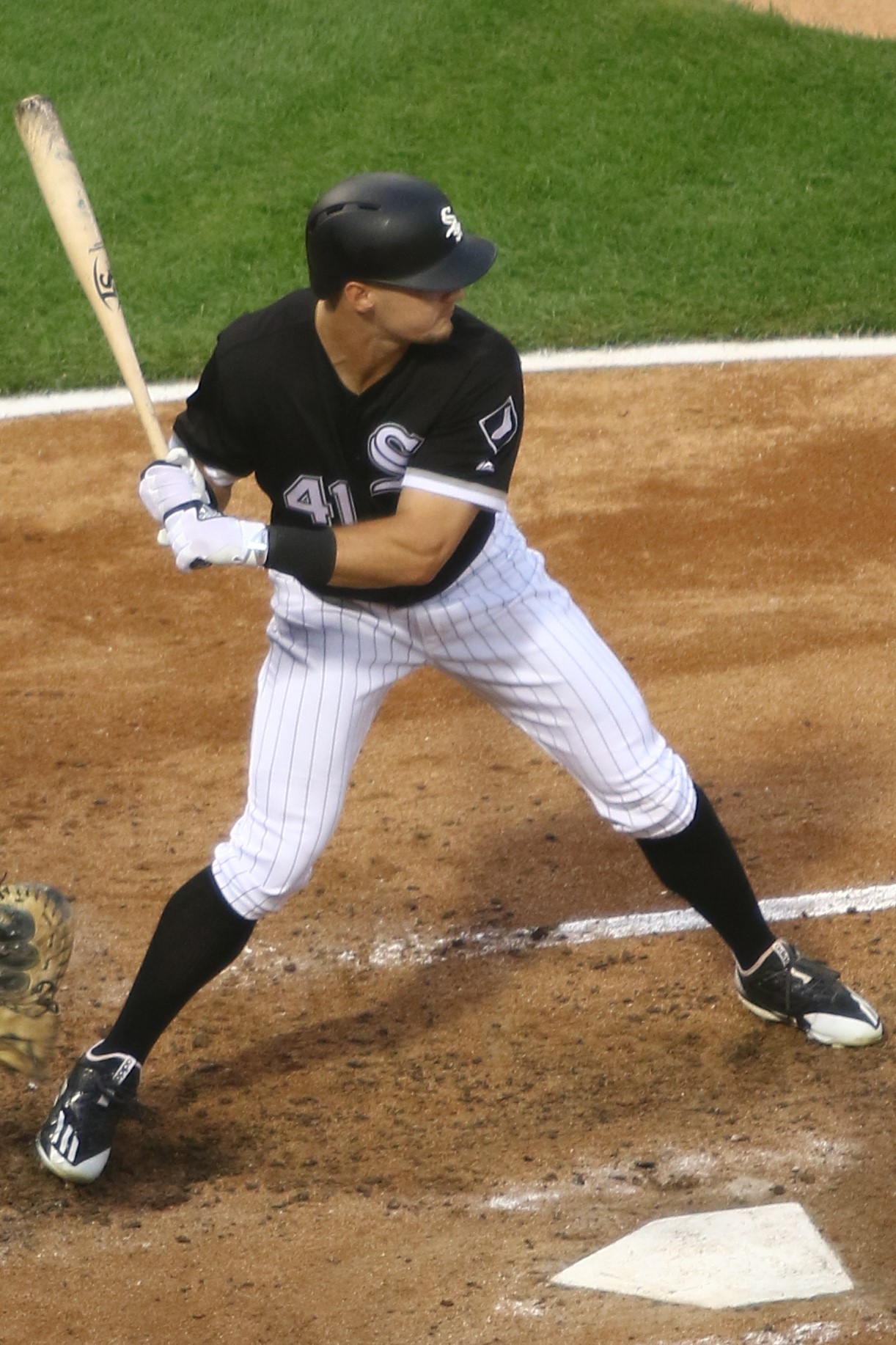
Engel with the Chicago White Sox

=== San Diego Padres ===
On January 6, 2023, Engel signed a one-year, major league contract with the San Diego Padres. Engel began the season on the injured list after suffering a left hamstring strain in spring training. He began a rehab assignment with the Triple-A El Paso Chihuahuas on April 15 and was activated off of the injured list on May 5. He played in 5 games for the Padres, appearing mainly as a pinch runner and going hitless in 6 at-bats. Engel was designated for assignment on May 20, when José Azócar was activated from the injured list. He was released by the Padres on May 24.

=== Seattle Mariners ===
On May 30, 2023, Engel signed a minor league contract with the Seattle Mariners organization. In 76 games for the Triple–A Tacoma Rainiers, he batted .250/.371/.451 with 12 home runs, 34 RBI, and 19 stolen bases. Engel elected free agency following the season on November 6.

Engel retired from professional baseball following the 2023 season and opened a fitness studio.
