= Nick Madrigal =

American baseball player (born 1997)

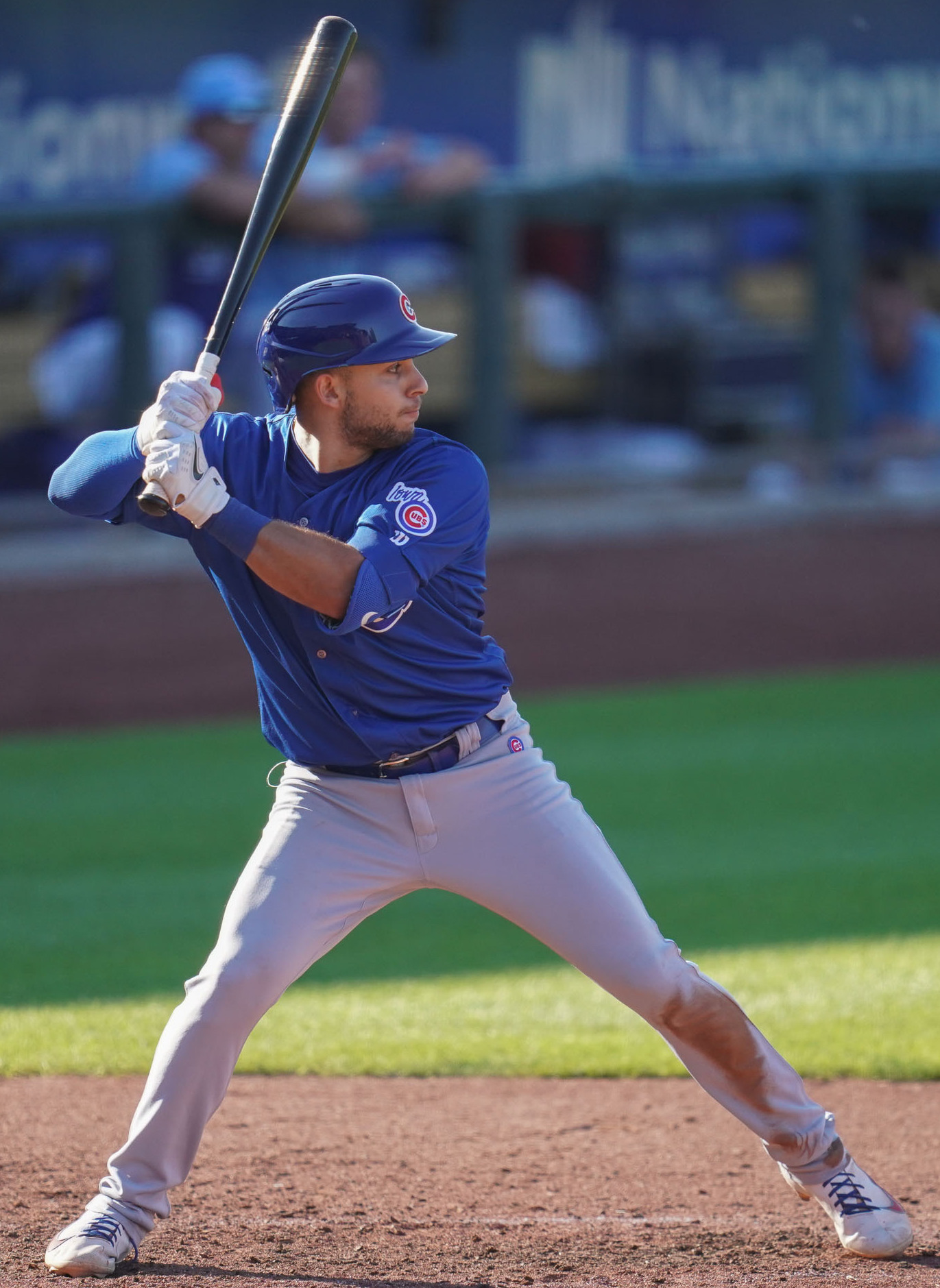
- Madrigal with the Iowa Cubs in 2022

Free agent
- Second baseman / Third baseman
- Born: March 5, 1997 (age 29); Sacramento, California, U.S.
- Bats: Right Throws: Right

MLB debut
- July 31, 2020, for the Chicago White Sox

MLB statistics (through 2026 season)
- Batting average: .274
- Home runs: 4
- Runs batted in: 80
- Stats at Baseball Reference

Teams
- Chicago White Sox (2020–2021); Chicago Cubs (2022–2024); Los Angeles Angels (2026); Tampa Bay Rays (2026)

Nicklaus Michael Madrigal (born March 5, 1997) is an American professional baseball second baseman who is a free agent. He has previously played in Major League Baseball (MLB) for the Chicago White Sox, Chicago Cubs, Los Angeles Angels, and Tampa Bay Rays. Madrigal played college baseball for the Oregon State Beavers and was selected by the White Sox in the first round of the 2018 MLB draft. He made his MLB debut in 2020 with the White Sox.

== Amateur career ==
Madrigal attended Elk Grove High School in Elk Grove, California, where he was teammates with Dylan Carlson. In 2015, his senior year, he batted .449 with 28 stolen bases. He was drafted by the Cleveland Indians in the 17th round of the 2015 Major League Baseball draft. He did not sign with the Indians and attended Oregon State University where he played college baseball for the Beavers.

As a freshman at Oregon State, Madrigal started in 49 games and hit .333/.380/.456 with one home run and 29 runs batted in (RBIs). He was named the Pac-12 Freshman of the Year and was a first team All-Pac-12 selection. In 2017, Madrigal's sophomore year, he batted .380 with four home runs and forty RBIs in sixty games and was named the Pac-12 Player of the Year. He was also named to the College World Series All-Tournament Team. In 2018, as a junior, he slashed .367/.428/.511 with three home runs and 34 RBIs in 42 games.

== Professional career ==
=== Chicago White Sox ===
==== Minor leagues ====
Madrigal was selected fourth overall by the Chicago White Sox in the 2018 Major League Baseball draft. He signed for $6,411,400, and was assigned to the rookie–level Arizona League White Sox before being promoted to the Single–A Kannapolis Intimidators in July and the High–A Winston-Salem Dash in August. In 43 games between the three affiliates, Madrigal slashed .303/.353/.348 with 16 RBI and eight stolen bases. He returned to Winston-Salem to begin 2019 and was promoted to the Double-A Birmingham Barons in June after slashing .272/.346/.377 with 52 hits, 20 runs scored, and 17 stolen bases in 49 games with the team. Madrigal was named to the 2019 All-Star Futures Game. After the 2019 MLB trade deadline, he was promoted to the Triple–A Charlotte Knights.

==== Major leagues ====
On July 31, 2020, Madrigal was promoted to the major leagues for the first time. He started at second base and batted ninth against the Kansas City Royals, and went 0–for–3. On August 4, Madrigal suffered a separated shoulder while sliding into third base during a game against the Milwaukee Brewers. The next day he was placed on the injured list. Overall with the 2020 Chicago White Sox, Madrigal batted .340 with no home runs and 11 RBI in 29 games. Madrigal underwent surgery to repair his separated shoulder following the 2020 season.

On April 24, 2021, Madrigal got his first walk–off hit in his major league career in the bottom of the ninth inning against the Texas Rangers off of pitcher John King, leading the White Sox to a 2–1 win. On May 17, Madrigal hit his first major league home run off of J. A. Happ of the Minnesota Twins. Madrigal hit .305/.349/.425 with two home runs and 21 RBI in 54 games. He was the team leader in hits with 61 until June 9, when he suffered a proximal tear of his right hamstring. Madrigal was placed on the 60-day injured list the following day. On June 15, the Chicago White Sox announced on Twitter that Madrigal had undergone surgery to repair the hamstring and would miss the remainder of the 2021 season.

=== Chicago Cubs ===
On July 30, 2021, Madrigal was traded along with Codi Heuer to the Chicago Cubs in exchange for Craig Kimbrel. Madrigal made his Cubs debut in 2022 and played 59 games in that season, hitting .249/.305/.282, producing 0.7 WAR while playing second base.

On January 13, 2023, Madrigal agreed to a one-year, $1.2 million contract with the Cubs, avoiding salary arbitration. Madrigal opened the 2023 season with the Cubs as their primary third baseman. In 92 games for Chicago, he slashed .263/.311/.352 with two home runs, 28 RBI, and 10 stolen bases.

In 51 games for the Cubs in 2024, Madrigal slashed .221/.280/.256 with no home runs and 10 RBI. While playing with the Triple–A Iowa Cubs, he suffered a fracture in his left hand after he was hit by a Trey Wingenter pitch. Madrigal was transferred to the 60–day injured list on September 1. On November 22, the Cubs non–tendered Madrigal, making him a free agent.

=== New York Mets ===
On January 31, 2025, Madrigal signed a one-year, split contract with the New York Mets. On February 28, it was announced that Madrigal was likely to miss the entirety of the 2025 season after suffering a fractured left shoulder that would require surgery.

=== Los Angeles Angels ===
On January 9, 2026, Madrigal signed a minor league contract with the Los Angeles Angels. He made 38 appearances for the Triple-A Salt Lake Bees, slashing .275/.353/.366 with two home runs, 23 RBI, and three stolen bases. On May 27, the Angels selected Madrigal's contract, adding him to their active roster. He made 15 appearances for Los Angeles, batting .273/.385/.295 with two RBI and one stolen base. Madrigal was designated for assignment by the Angels on June 22. He elected free agency after clearing waivers on June 25.

=== Tampa Bay Rays ===
On June 28, 2026, Madrigal signed a minor league contract with the Tampa Bay Rays. Madrigal played for the Triple-A Durham Bulls before he was promoted to the major leagues following an injury to Taylor Walls on September 8. He made four appearances for the Rays, going 3–for–10 (.300) with one RBI. On November 2, Madrigal was removed from the 40–man roster and sent outright to Durham, after which he elected free agency.

== Personal life ==
His twin brother, Ty, played college baseball at Saint Mary's College of California. He signed with the White Sox as an undrafted free agent on June 16, 2020.
