= Matt Foster =

American baseball player (born 1995)

Algodoneros de Unión Laguna – No. 80
- Pitcher
- Born: January 27, 1995 (age 31); Valley, Alabama, U.S.
- Bats: Right Throws: Right

MLB debut
- August 1, 2020, for the Chicago White Sox

MLB statistics (through 2024 season)
- Win–loss record: 9–5
- Earned run average: 4.30
- Strikeouts: 117
- Stats at Baseball Reference

Teams
- Chicago White Sox (2020–2022, 2024)

Matthew James Foster (born January 27, 1995) is an American professional baseball pitcher for the Algodoneros de Unión Laguna of the Mexican League. He has previously played in Major League Baseball (MLB) for the Chicago White Sox.

== Amateur career ==
Foster attended Valley High School in Valley, Alabama. He was drafted by the Arizona Diamondbacks in the 29th round of the 2013 MLB draft, but did not sign. He attended Gulf Coast State College for two years (2014-2015). He then transferred to the University of Alabama, and played for the Crimson Tide for the 2016 season. Foster was drafted by the Chicago White Sox in the 20th round of the 2016 MLB draft.

== Professional career ==
=== Chicago White Sox ===
Foster split the 2016 season between the Arizona League White Sox and the Great Falls Voyagers, going a combined 0–0 with a 0.61 ERA over 29 2/3 innings. He split the 2017 season between the Kannapolis Intimidators and the Winston-Salem Dash, going a combined 0–2 with a 1.30 ERA over 27 2/3 innings. He played for the Glendale Desert Dogs of the Arizona Fall League following the 2017 season. He split the 2018 season between Winston-Salem and the Birmingham Barons, going a combined 2–5 with a 3.30 ERA over 60 innings. He split the 2019 season between Birmingham and the Charlotte Knights, going a combined 4–1 with a 3.20 ERA over 64 2/3 innings.

On November 20, 2019, the White Sox added Foster to their 40-man roster to protect him from the Rule 5 draft. On July 29, 2020, Foster was called up to the major leagues. He made his MLB debut on August 1, pitching a scoreless inning of relief and earning a win in the process. With the 2020 Chicago White Sox, Foster appeared in 23 games, compiling a 6–1 record with 2.20 ERA and 31 strikeouts in 28 2/3 innings pitched.

Foster struggled in 2021 as he was in and out of Triple-A in that season. Foster appeared in 37 games in the major leagues compiling a 2–1 record with a 6.00 ERA in 39 innings while striking out 40 batters. In 2022, Foster made 48 appearances for Chicago, working to a 1–2 record and 4.40 ERA with 42 strikeouts in 45 innings pitched.

On March 20, 2023, Foster was shut down after it was revealed he had a forearm strain in his throwing arm. On April 21, it was announced that Foster had undergone Tommy John surgery and would miss the entire 2023 season.

On August 16, 2024, Foster was activated from the injured list to make his return from surgery. On November 4, he was sent outright to Triple-A, but he rejected the assignment and elected free agency.

=== Algodoneros de Unión Laguna ===
On April 30, 2025, Foster signed with the Algodoneros de Unión Laguna of the Mexican League. In 12 appearances for Unión Laguna, Foster compiled a 3–0 record and 0.66 ERA with 13 strikeouts across 13 2/3 innings pitched.

=== Arizona Diamondbacks ===
On June 14, 2025, Foster signed a minor league contract with the Arizona Diamondbacks. He made 31 appearances for the Triple-A Reno Aces, posting a 2–2 record and 3.89 ERA with 42 strikeouts and two saves across 34 2/3 innings pitched. Foster elected free agency following the season on November 6.

=== Algodoneros de Unión Laguna (second stint) ===
On March 26, 2026, Foster signed with the Algodoneros de Unión Laguna of the Mexican League.
