= Bernardo Flores =

American baseball player (born 1995)

Bernardo Flores Jr.

Piratas de Campeche – No. 30
- Pitcher
- Born: August 23, 1995 (age 31); Baldwin Park, California, U.S.
- Bats: Left Throws: Left

MLB debut
- September 3, 2020, for the Chicago White Sox

MLB statistics (through 2021 season)
- Win–loss record: 0–0
- Earned run average: 13.50
- Strikeouts: 2
- Stats at Baseball Reference

Teams
- Chicago White Sox (2020); St. Louis Cardinals (2021)

Bernardo Flores Jr. (born August 23, 1995) is an American professional baseball pitcher for the Piratas de Campeche of the Mexican League. He has previously played in Major League Baseball (MLB) for the Chicago White Sox and St. Louis Cardinals.

== Career ==
=== Amateur career ===
Flores attended Baldwin Park High School in Baldwin Park, California and played college baseball at the University of Southern California (USC). After the 2015 season, he played collegiate summer baseball with the Cotuit Kettleers of the Cape Cod Baseball League.

=== Chicago White Sox ===
Flores was drafted by the Chicago White Sox in the seventh round, with the 206th overall selection, of the 2016 Major League Baseball draft.

Flores made his professional debut in 2016 with the rookie-level Arizona League White Sox and Great Falls Voyagers, going 6–2 with a 3.46 ERA and 52 strikeouts over 65 innings. He split the 2017 season between the Single-A Kannapolis Intimidators and High-A Winston-Salem Dash, going 10–7 with a 3.42 ERA and 103 strikeouts over 118 1/3 innings. Flores split the 2018 season between Winston-Salem and the Double-A Birmingham Barons, going a combined 8–9 with a 2.65 ERA and 105 strikeouts over 156 innings.

Flores split the 2019 season between the AZL White Sox, Kannapolis, and Birmingham, combining to go 3–8 with a 3.57 ERA and 82 strikeouts over 93 1/3 innings. After the 2019 season, he played in the Arizona Fall League for the Glendale Desert Dogs. On November 20, 2019, the White Sox added Flores to their 40-man roster to protect him from the Rule 5 draft.

Flores made his MLB debut against the Kansas City Royals on September 3, 2020. With the White Sox during his rookie campaign, Flores appeared in 2 games, compiling a 9.00 ERA with 2 strikeouts in 2 innings pitched.

=== St. Louis Cardinals ===
On April 1, 2021, Flores was claimed off waivers by the St. Louis Cardinals. Flores made one appearance with the Cardinals, spending most of his time with the Triple-A Memphis Redbirds, before he was designated for assignment on June 22.

=== Colorado Rockies ===
On June 24, 2021, Flores was claimed off waivers by the Colorado Rockies. In 3 games (2 starts) for the Triple-A Albuquerque Isotopes, he logged an 0-2 record and 5.73 ERA with 9 strikeouts over 11 innings of work. Flores also made 2 starts for the rookie-level Arizona Complex League Rockies, recording a 2.57 ERA with 7 strikeouts across 7 innings pitched. He was designated for assignment by Colorado on September 18. Flores cleared waivers and was sent outright to Triple-A Albuquerque on September 20.

On April 1, 2022, Flores was released by the Rockies organization.

=== Cincinnati Reds ===
On April 1, 2022, Flores signed a minor league contract with the Cincinnati Reds. In 5 starts for the Triple-A Louisville Bats, he struggled to an 0-1 record and 7.13 ERA with 13 strikeouts across 17 2/3 innings pitched. Flores was released by the Reds organization on May 21.

=== Diablos Rojos del México ===
On June 3, 2022, Flores signed with the Diablos Rojos del México of the Mexican League. He appeared in 7 games, making 6 starts with a 1-0 record and 4.15 ERA with 27 strikeouts in 26 innings pitched.

=== Texas Rangers ===
On February 3, 2023, Flores signed a minor league contract with the Texas Rangers organization. He was assigned to the Triple-A Round Rock Express to begin the year, but struggled to an 0-1 record and 7.71 ERA with 4 strikeouts in 4 2/3 innings pitched across 3 games (1 start). Flores was released by the Rangers organization on April 25.

=== Diablos Rojos del México (second stint) ===
On May 6, 2023, Flores signed with the Diablos Rojos del México of the Mexican League. In 4 starts, Flores posted a 0–1 record with a 5.93 ERA and 7 strikeouts in 13 2/3 innings of work.

=== Guerreros de Oaxaca ===
On June 23, 2023, Flores was traded to the Guerreros de Oaxaca of the Mexican League. In 7 starts for the club, he compiled a 1–4 record and 6.35 ERA with 24 strikeouts across 34 innings pitched.

Flores made 8 relief outings for the Guerreros in 2024, struggling to a 14.73 ERA with 5 strikeouts across 7 1/3 innings of work. He was released by Oaxaca on May 10, 2024.

=== Tigres de Quintana Roo ===
On June 12, 2024, Flores signed with the Tigres de Quintana Roo of the Mexican League. He made 7 appearances (4 starts) for the Tigres, struggling to an 0–2 record and 8.38 ERA with 12 strikeouts across 19 1/3 innings pitched. Flores was released by Quintana Roo on December 17.

=== Long Island Ducks ===
On March 20, 2025, Flores signed with the Long Island Ducks of the Atlantic League of Professional Baseball. In 24 appearances (two starts) for Long Island, he pitched to a 2-2 record and 6.75 ERA with 21 strikeouts and one save across 37 1/3 innings pitched. Flores was released by the Ducks on August 19.

=== Piratas de Campeche ===
On January 29, 2026, Flores signed with the Piratas de Campeche of the Mexican League. In eight appearances for Campeche, Flores struggled to a 14.34 ERA with eight strikeouts across 10 2/3 innings pitched

=== Staten Island FerryHawks ===
On July 8, 2026, Flores signed with the Staten Island FerryHawks of the Atlantic League of Professional Baseball. In 5 starts he threw 16.1 innings struggling mightily going 0-5 with a 13.78 ERA with more walks (12) than strikeouts (9). He was released on August 7.
