= Centene Stadium =

Centene Stadium may refer to:

- Centene Stadium (Great Falls, Montana), the home stadium of the Great Falls Voyagers in Great Falls, Montana
- Energizer Park, the home stadium of St. Louis City SC in St. Louis, Missouri, briefly known as Centene Stadium in 2022
