= Jimmy Cordero =

Dominican baseball player (born 1991)

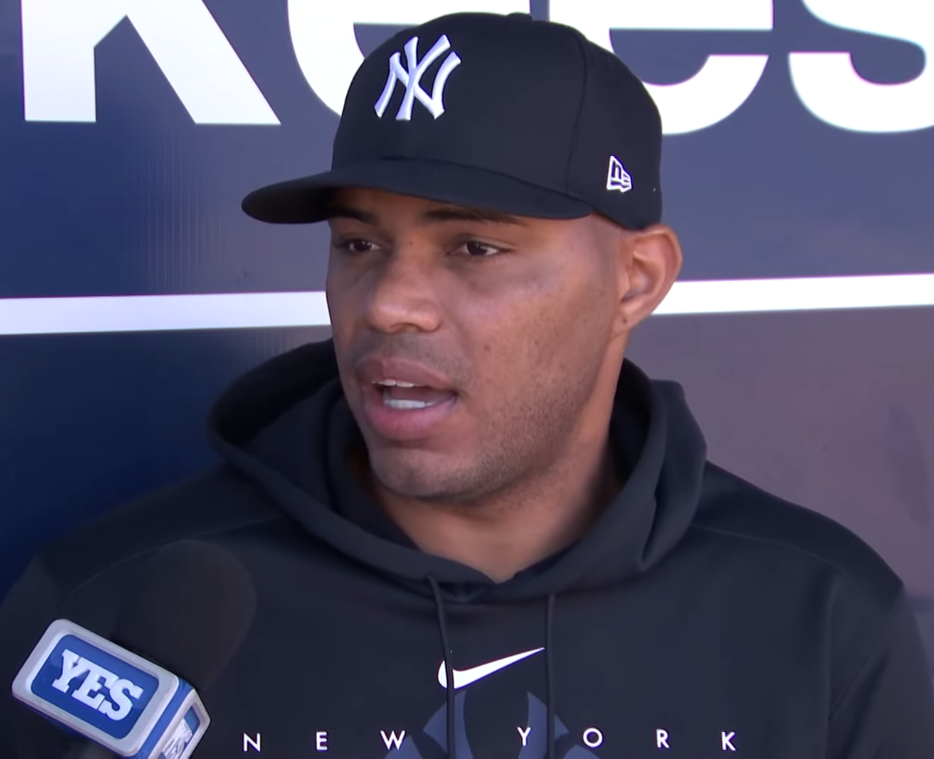
- Cordero with the New York Yankees in 2023

Olmecas de Tabasco – No. 94
- Pitcher
- Born: October 19, 1991 (age 34); San Cristóbal, Dominican Republic
- Bats: Right Throws: Right

Professional debut
- MLB: August 2, 2018, for the Washington Nationals
- NPB: July 4, 2024, for the Chiba Lotte Marines

MLB statistics (through 2023 season)
- Win–loss record: 6–7
- Earned run average: 4.36
- Strikeouts: 99

NPB statistics (through 2024 season)
- Win–loss record: 0–1
- Earned run average: 7.20
- Strikeouts: 1
- Stats at Baseball Reference

Teams
- Washington Nationals (2018); Toronto Blue Jays (2019); Chicago White Sox (2019–2020); New York Yankees (2023); Chiba Lotte Marines (2024)

Jimmy Gerard Cordero (born October 19, 1991) is a Dominican professional baseball pitcher for the Olmecas de Tabasco of the Mexican League. He has previously played in Major League Baseball (MLB) for the Washington Nationals, Toronto Blue Jays, Chicago White Sox, and New York Yankees, and in Nippon Professional Baseball (NPB) for the Chiba Lotte Marines.

== Career ==
=== Toronto Blue Jays ===
Cordero signed with the Toronto Blue Jays as an international free agent on January 6, 2012. He made his professional debut with the Dominican Summer League Blue Jays. In 2013, Cordero made 16 appearances split between the rookie-level Gulf Coast League Blue Jays and rookie-level Bluefield Blue Jays, accumulating a 4–2 record and 5.47 ERA with 31 strikeouts.

In 2014, Cordero made 25 appearances out of the bullpen for the Single-A Lansing Lugnuts, posting a 3–2 record and 3.06 ERA with 34 strikeouts across 32 1/3 innings pitched. He began the 2015 season with the High-A Dunedin Blue Jays, logging an 0–1 record and 2.49 ERA with 24 strikeouts. Cordero also appeared in 17 games for the Double-A New Hampshire Fisher Cats, where he pitched of an 0–1 record and 2.92 ERA with 22 strikeouts and one save across 24 2/3 innings of work.

=== Philadelphia Phillies ===
The Blue Jays traded Cordero along with Alberto Tirado to the Philadelphia Phillies in exchange for Ben Revere on July 31, 2015. He made 13 appearances for the Double-A Reading Fightin Phils, recording a 2.12 ERA with 18 strikeouts over 17 innings of work. On November 20, the Phillies added Cordero to their 40-man roster to protect him from the Rule 5 draft.

Cordero split the 2016 season between the rookie-level Gulf Coast League Phillies, High-A Clearwater Threshers, Reading, and the Triple-A Lehigh Valley IronPigs. In 22 appearances for the four affiliates, he logged a cumulative 2–3 record and 5.00 ERA with 19 strikeouts and two saves over 27 innings of work.

=== Washington Nationals ===
On December 12, 2016, the Phillies completed a trade with the Washington Nationals, sending Cordero in exchange for minor league pitcher Mario Sanchez. He started the 2017 season pitching for the Double–A Harrisburg Senators of the Eastern League. The Nationals designated him for assignment, removing him from their 40-man roster, on July 31, 2017, to make room for the acquisition of closer Brandon Kintzler. After being outrighted to Harrisburg, he finished his season with a 6.84 ERA over 51⅓ innings. He was invited to participate in the Nationals' 2018 spring training camp the following year.

Cordero was promoted to the major leagues on August 1, 2018, after the Nationals designated veteran reliever Shawn Kelley for assignment. He made his major league debut on August 2 against the Cincinnati Reds. He spent the early weeks of the 2019 season with the Nationals′ Triple–A affiliate, the Fresno Grizzlies of the Pacific Coast League, where he compiled a 6.00 ERA, 1.73 WHIP, and 17-to-9 strikeout-to-walk ratio in 15 innings of work. On May 9, 2019, the Nationals signed outfielder Gerardo Parra to a one-year deal and designated Cordero for assignment to make room for Parra on their 40-man roster.

=== Toronto Blue Jays (second stint) ===
The Toronto Blue Jays claimed Cordero off waivers on May 15, 2019, and assigned him to the Triple–A Buffalo Bisons of the International League. He was recalled on May 21, and designated for assignment on May 23.

=== Seattle Mariners ===
On May 27, 2019, Cordero was claimed off waivers by the Seattle Mariners and assigned to the Double-A Arkansas Travelers. He made one scoreless appearance for Arkansas, striking out one in 2/3 of an inning.

=== Chicago White Sox ===
Cordero was claimed by the Chicago White Sox on June 7. He registered an ERA of 2.75 in 30 games for Chicago. On September 26, 2020, Cordero received a 3-game suspension stemming from the night before in which he intentionally hit Chicago Cubs catcher Willson Contreras after Contreras had hit a home run and flipped his bat off of teammate Dylan Cease earlier in the game. With the 2020 Chicago White Sox, Cordero appeared in 30 games, compiling a 1–2 record with 6.08 ERA and 22 strikeouts in 26 2/3 innings pitched.

Cordero underwent Tommy John surgery on March 18, 2021. The surgery was performed by Dr. James Andrews. Cordero missed the entire 2021 season recovering from the surgery; he was placed on the 60-day injured list on March 21. On November 5, Cordero was outrighted off of the 40-man roster and elected free agency.

=== New York Yankees ===
On December 16, 2021, Cordero signed a minor league deal with the New York Yankees. He had a 2.09 ERA in 38 2/3 innings for the Scranton/Wilkes-Barre RailRiders in 2022. On November 10, 2022, the Yankees added Cordero to their 40-man roster.

Cordero made the Yankees' Opening Day roster for the 2023 season. On July 5, MLB suspended Cordero for the remainder of the season for violating the league's policy against domestic violence. In 31 appearances for the Yankees, he posted a 3.86 ERA with 34 strikeouts across 32 2/3 innings of work. Following the season on November 2, Cordero was removed from the 40–man roster and sent outright to Triple–A Scranton. He elected free agency on November 6.

=== Chiba Lotte Marines ===
On December 6, 2023, Cordero signed with the Chiba Lotte Marines of Nippon Professional Baseball. He made 5 appearances for Lotte in 2024, struggling to an 0–1 record and 7.20 ERA with one strikeout across five innings of work. Cordero became a free agent following the season.

=== Toros de Tijuana ===
On March 13, 2025, Cordero signed with the Toros de Tijuana of the Mexican League. In 20 appearances for Tijuana, Cordero posted a 2–2 record and 4.00 ERA with 15 strikeouts and six saves over 18 innings of work.

=== Caliente de Durango ===
On June 2, 2025, Cordero was traded to the Caliente de Durango of the Mexican League in exchange for Tyler Duffey. In 12 appearances for Durango, Cordero logged a 2–0 record and 9.00 ERA with 14 strikeouts over 12 innings of relief.

=== Olmecas de Tabasco ===
On July 2, 2025, Cordero was traded to the Olmecas de Tabasco of the Mexican League in exchange for Rubén Tejada. In 12 games 12 innings of relief he went 0–0 with a 2.25 ERA and 7 strikeouts.

== Pitching style ==
Cordero is known for a fastball that sits in the high 90s, can hit 100 mph, and has been clocked as fast as 104 mph. He also throws a slider and an occasional curveball. Throughout his career, scouts have noted Cordero's struggles to command his power pitches.
