= Evan Marshall (baseball) =

American baseball player (born 1990)

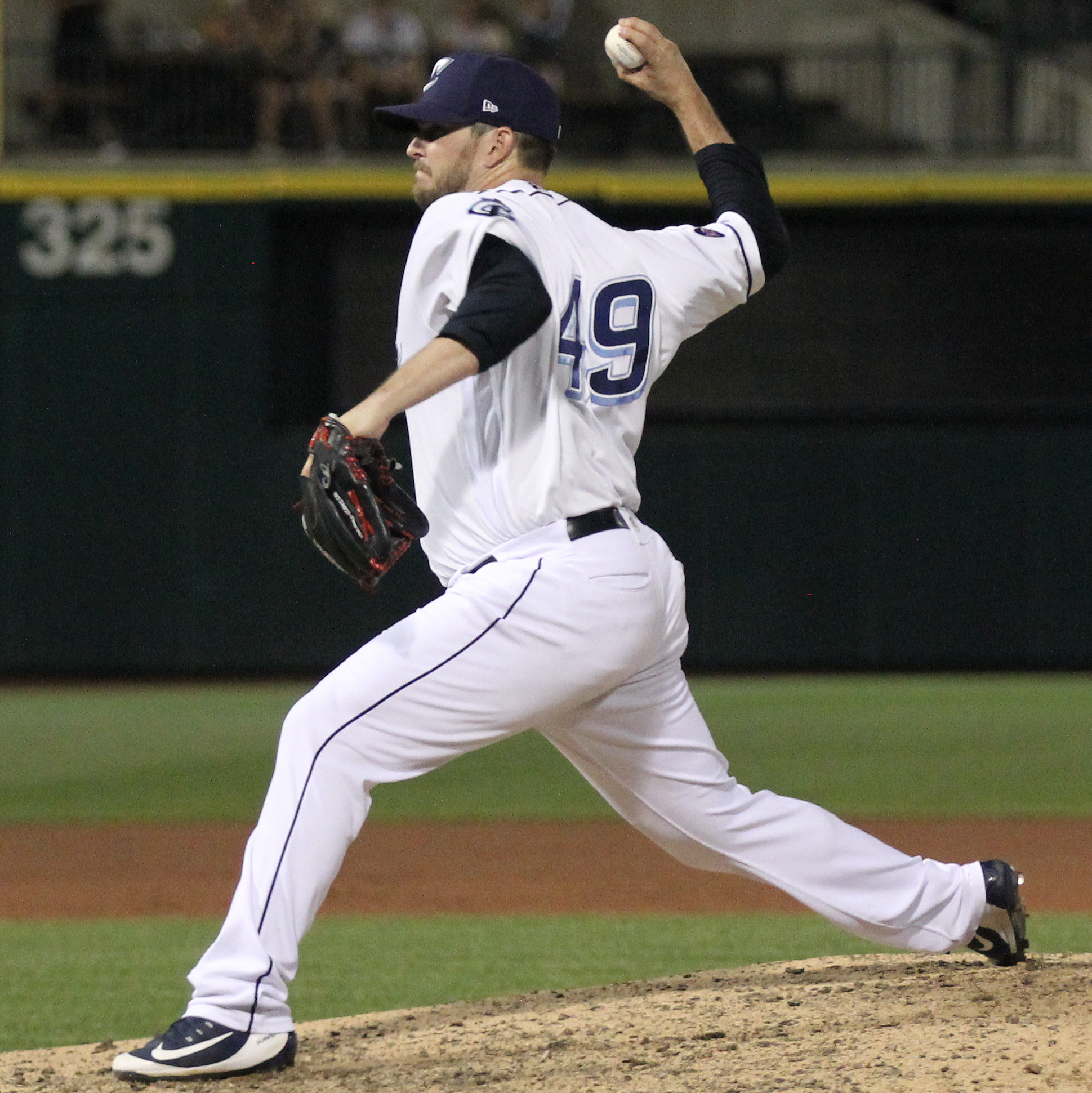
- Marshall with the Columbus Clippers in 2018
- Pitcher
- Born: April 18, 1990 (age 36); Sunnyvale, California, U.S.
- Batted: Right Threw: Right

MLB debut
- May 6, 2014, for the Arizona Diamondbacks

Last MLB appearance
- June 29, 2021, for the Chicago White Sox

MLB statistics
- Win–loss record: 10–12
- Earned run average: 4.19
- Strikeouts: 180
- Stats at Baseball Reference

Teams
- Arizona Diamondbacks (2014–2016); Seattle Mariners (2017); Cleveland Indians (2018); Chicago White Sox (2019–2021)

Evan Patrick Marshall (born April 18, 1990) is an American former professional baseball pitcher. He played in Major League Baseball (MLB) for the Arizona Diamondbacks, Seattle Mariners, Cleveland Indians, and Chicago White Sox.

== Career ==
=== Arizona Diamondbacks ===
Marshall graduated from Homestead High School in Cupertino, California in 2008. Marshall was drafted by the Arizona Diamondbacks in the fourth round, with the 124th overall selection, of the 2011 Major League Baseball draft out of Kansas State University. He split his first professional season between the Low-A Yakima Bears, High-A Visalia Rawhide, and Double-A Mobile BayBears.

Marshall spent the entire 2012 season with Mobile, posting a 6-3 record and 3.51 ERA with 27 strikeouts and 16 saves in 48 2/3 innings pitched across 42 games. Marshall spent the 2013 season with the Triple-A Reno Aces, registering a 3-6 record and 4.34 ERA with 59 strikeouts and three saves in 58 innings pitched across 54 relief appearances. He returned to Reno to begin the 2014 season.

On May 5, 2014, Marshall was selected to the 40-man roster and promoted to the major leagues for the first time. Marshall made 57 appearances for the Diamondbacks during his rookie campaign, compiling a 4-4 record and 2.74 ERA with 54 strikeouts across 49 1/3 innings pitched.

Marshall pitched in 13 games for Arizona during the 2015 season, but struggled to an 0-2 record and 6.08 ERA with seven strikeouts across 13 1/3 innings pitched. Marshall pitching for the minor league Reno Aces on August 7, 2015, he was hit in the head by a batted ball. He was diagnosed with a skull fracture and needed neurosurgical treatment to relieve the raised intra-cranial pressure.

Marshall made 15 appearances for the Diamondbacks during the 2016 season, tallying an 0-1 record and 8.80 ERA with nine strikeouts across 15 1/3 innings pitched.

=== Seattle Mariners ===
On April 4, 2017, Marshall was claimed off waivers by the Seattle Mariners. In six appearances for Seattle, he struggled to a 9.39 ERA with 4 strikeouts across 7 2/3 innings of work. On May 10, Marshall was placed on the 60–day injured list with a hamstring injury. Upon being activated on August 2, he was removed from the 40–man roster and sent outright to the Triple–A Tacoma Rainiers. In 13 games for Tacoma down the stretch, Marshall logged a 4.15 ERA with 26 strikeouts across 21 2/3 innings pitched. He elected free agency following the season on November 6.

=== Cleveland Indians ===
On November 30, 2017, Marshall signed a minor league deal with the Cleveland Indians. He had his contract purchased on May 3, 2018. The Indians designated Marshall for assignment on September 1. After clearing waivers, Marshall was outrighted to the minor leagues on September 4. He elected free agency on October 2.

=== Chicago White Sox ===
On October 31, 2018, Marshall signed a minor league deal with the Chicago White Sox. He was assigned to Triple-A to start the 2019 season. On May 1, 2019, the White Sox purchased his contract and he pitched in a game against the Baltimore Orioles that day, pitching 1 1/3 innings and retiring all 4 batters he faced. In his first season in Chicago, Marshall registered an ERA of 2.49 in 55 games. In the 2020 season, Marshall appeared in 23 games, compiling a 2–1 record with 2.38 ERA and 30 strikeouts in 22 2/3 innings pitched.

Marshall pitched 27 1/3 innings across 27 games for the White Sox in 2021, accumulating a 5.60 ERA, 4.63 FIP, and an 8.6 K/9 rate. The righty suffered a strained right flexor pronator in his elbow, which forced him to the 10-day injured list on June 29, 2021. The club then placed Marshall on the 60-day injured list on July 29. On November 5, Marshall was outrighted off of the 40-man roster and elected free agency.

On November 23, 2021, Marshall elected to undergo Tommy John surgery and missed the entire 2022 season.

=== Los Angeles Angels ===
On March 17, 2023, Marshall signed a minor league contract with the Los Angeles Angels. He did not appear in a game for the organization and elected free agency following the season on November 6.
