= Tim Anderson (baseball) =

American baseball player (born 1993)

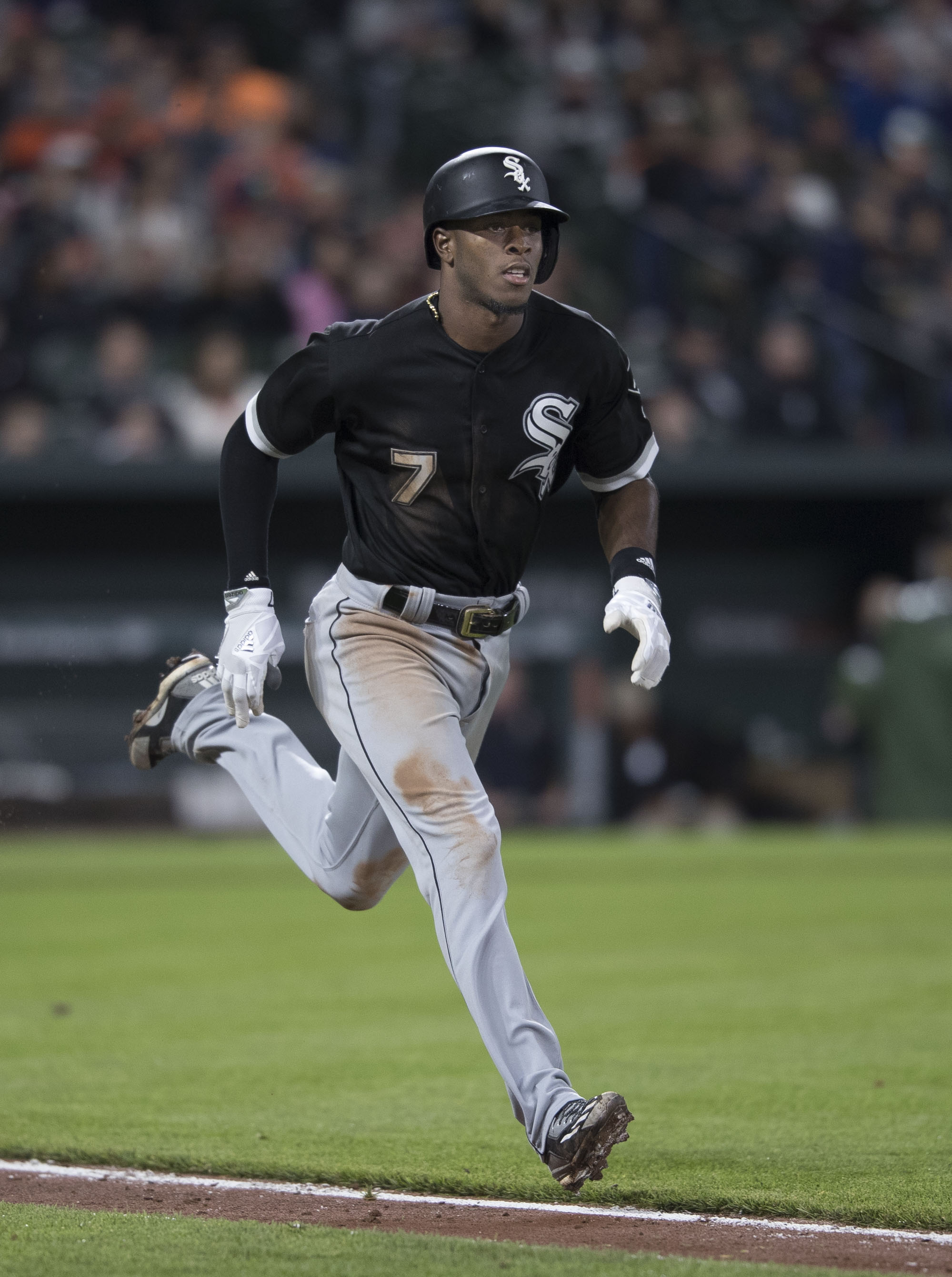
- Anderson with the Chicago White Sox in 2017
- Shortstop
- Born: June 23, 1993 (age 33); Tuscaloosa, Alabama, U.S.
- Batted: Right Threw: Right

MLB debut
- June 10, 2016, for the Chicago White Sox

Last MLB appearance
- May 25, 2025, for the Los Angeles Angels

MLB statistics
- Batting average: .276
- Home runs: 98
- Runs batted in: 350
- Stats at Baseball Reference

Teams
- Chicago White Sox (2016–2023); Miami Marlins (2024); Los Angeles Angels (2025)

Career highlights and awards
- 2× All-Star (2021, 2022); Silver Slugger Award (2020); AL batting champion (2019)
Medals
Men's baseball
Representing United States
World Baseball Classic
Silver medal – second place	2023 Miami	Team

Timothy Devon Anderson Jr. (born June 23, 1993) is an American former professional baseball shortstop. He played in Major League Baseball (MLB) for the Chicago White Sox, Miami Marlins, and Los Angeles Angels from 2016 to 2025.

Anderson played college baseball at East Central Community College, and was selected in the first round of the 2013 MLB draft by the White Sox. He made his MLB debut in 2016. Anderson led the American League in batting average in 2019, won the Silver Slugger Award in 2020, and was an All-Star in 2021 and 2022.

== Early life ==
Anderson was born in Tuscaloosa, Alabama. His father, Tim Sr., was arrested on drug trafficking charges before he was born and served the first 15 years of Tim Jr.'s life in prison. His birth mother was already raising four children and was unable to care for Anderson as well, so he was raised by his aunt and uncle along with their three children. His grandfather took him to visit his father often, so that they could have a relationship.

Anderson attended Hillcrest High School in Tuscaloosa, Alabama. Anderson played little league baseball as a kid but eventually cut the sport out of his life up until his junior year of high school. He focused on basketball in his first two years of high school, but broke both of his legs during his sophomore year. In his junior year, he played both baseball and basketball. As a junior, Anderson batted .333 as a left fielder. In his senior year, Anderson played as an infielder and batted .420. He was a part of the state basketball championship winning team in his senior year. Standing at 6 feet 1 inch (1.85 m), Anderson decided that he was likely too short to play professional basketball.

== College career ==
Anderson enrolled at East Central Community College in Decatur, Mississippi, to play college baseball. East Central was the only school to offer Anderson a baseball scholarship. In his freshman season, Anderson batted .360 with four home runs, 37 runs batted in (RBIs), and 30 stolen bases without being caught stealing. However, he received no interest from Major League Baseball (MLB) teams, and was not selected in the 2012 MLB draft. Returning to East Central for his sophomore year, Anderson had a breakout season, leading all junior college baseball players with a .495 batting average. He was named a first-team National Junior College Athletic Association Division II All-American. He committed to transfer to the University of Alabama at Birmingham (UAB).

== Professional career ==
=== Chicago White Sox ===
==== Draft and minor leagues ====
The Chicago White Sox selected Anderson in the first round, with the 17th overall selection, in the 2013 MLB draft. Anderson opted to sign with the White Sox, rather than enroll at UAB, for a signing bonus of $2,164,000. Though expected to make his professional debut with the Bristol White Sox of the Rookie-level Appalachian League, the White Sox assigned Anderson to the Kannapolis Intimidators of the Single–A South Atlantic League instead, a higher level than rookie ball. He batted .277 with one home run, 21 RBIs, and 24 stolen bases in 68 games for Kannapolis.

In 2014, Anderson began the season with the Winston-Salem Dash of the High–A Carolina League. He broke his wrist in late June, requiring surgery. In 68 games, Anderson had a .297 batting average, six home runs, and 10 stolen bases. He also committed 31 errors. When he returned in August, the White Sox promoted him to the Birmingham Barons of the Double–A Southern League, where he batted .364 in 10 games. The White Sox assigned Anderson to the Glendale Desert Dogs of the Arizona Fall League after the regular season.

The White Sox invited Anderson to spring training in 2015. He spent the season with Birmingham, batting .312 with five home runs and 49 stolen bases, while also committing 25 errors. Invited to spring training again in 2016, the White Sox assigned him to the Charlotte Knights of the Triple–A International League at the beginning of the season. In 55 games for Charlotte, Anderson batted .304 with four home runs, 20 RBIs, and 11 stolen bases.

==== 2016–2019 ====
On June 10, 2016, the White Sox designated Jimmy Rollins for assignment and promoted Anderson to the major leagues. Anderson made his MLB debut that day, hitting a double off of Ian Kennedy of the Kansas City Royals in his first at bat. In the 2016 season, Anderson batted .283 with nine home runs in 99 games for the White Sox.

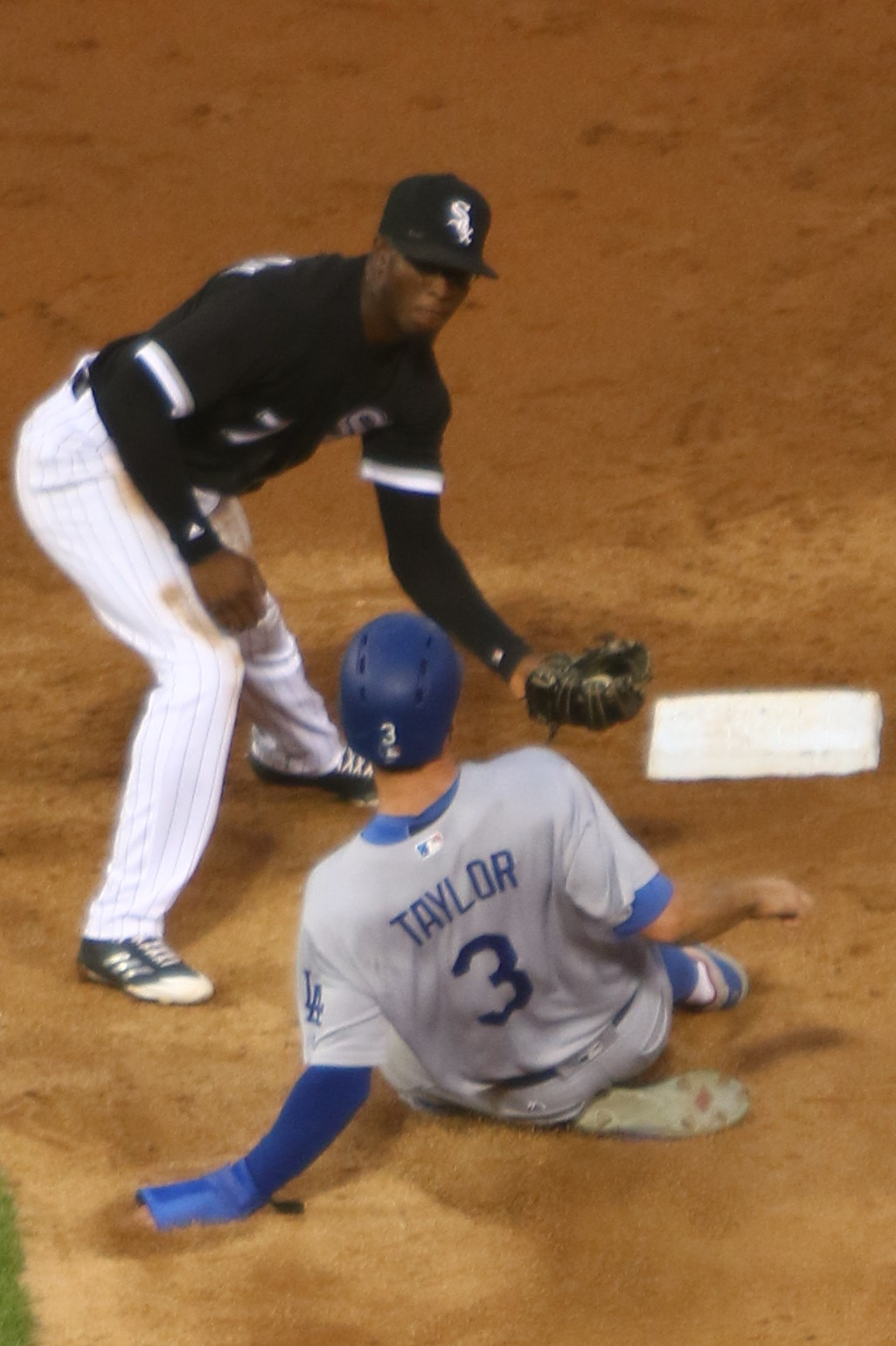
Anderson tagging out Chris Taylor

Before the 2017 season, Anderson signed a six-year contract worth $25 million, with club options for both the 2023 and 2024 seasons. He struggled in April 2017, batting .204 and striking out 24 times in 22 games. For the 2017 season, Anderson batted .257/.276/.402, walked in 2.1% of his at bats (the lowest percentage in the major leagues), and had the lowest walks-per-strikeout ratio in the majors (0.08). On defense, he led the major leagues in errors, with 28, and in fielding errors (with 16) and throwing errors (with 12).

In 2018, Anderson had a .240 batting average with 20 home runs and 26 stolen bases. On defense, he tied for the major league lead in throwing errors, with 12. In 2019, Anderson batted .335 (leading the major leagues)/.357/.508. He had the lowest walk percentage in the American League (2.9%). He had career highs in hits with 167, despite having 88 fewer plate appearances than in 2018. He also had a career high in doubles with 32, and runs with 81. On defense, he led all major league players in errors committed, with 26, and had the lowest fielding percentage of all major league shortstops (.951).

On April 17, 2019, Anderson was ejected after a bench-clearing incident in a game against the Kansas City Royals. After Anderson's fourth inning bat flip following a home run, he was hit by a pitch from Royals pitcher Brad Keller in his next at bat, causing both benches to clear. Two days later, Anderson was suspended one game by Major League Baseball for the use of a racial slur; ESPN's Jeff Passan reported that Anderson called Keller a "weak-ass f—ing n-word." Keller received a five game suspension.

==== 2020–22 ====
Overall with the 2020 Chicago White Sox, in the Covid-shortened season, Anderson batted .322/.357/.529 with 45 runs (tied for the AL lead), ten home runs, and 21 RBIs in 49 games. He won a Silver Slugger Award that season.

Anderson was the cover athlete for the 2021 installment of the R.B.I. Baseball video game series. On July 10, 2021, Anderson was named to the 2021 MLB All-Star Game as a replacement for Carlos Correa, who had decided not to attend. At the MLB Field of Dreams Game on August 12, 2021, Anderson hit a walk-off home run in the bottom of the ninth inning off of Zack Britton to win the game for the White Sox over the New York Yankees, 9–8. Overall in 2021, Anderson batted .309/.338/.469 in 123 games, with 17 home runs and 61 RBIs. He had the lowest walk percentage in the major leagues, at 4.0%.

During the White Sox game against the Cleveland Guardians on April 20, 2022, Anderson made three errors in the first two innings, then gave the finger to a fan who made a comment to him. Anderson apologized after the game. MLB suspended him for one game, but Anderson successfully appealed the suspension, which was replaced by a fine.

During a game against the New York Yankees on May 21, 2022, Yankees third baseman Josh Donaldson mockingly called Anderson "Jackie", which was in reference to a 2019 interview in which Anderson said that he felt like "today's Jackie Robinson" in reference to him wanting to change baseball. Later in the game, White Sox catcher Yasmani Grandal confronted Donaldson, leading to both teams clearing their benches. After the game, manager Tony La Russa called Donaldson's comment "racist" and Anderson agreed with him. Donaldson was suspended one game for "inappropriate comments" and apologized to both Anderson and Rachel Robinson, Robinson's widow.

Anderson made the All-Star team for the second year in a row. Anderson was named the starter at shortstop for the American League, becoming the first White Sox shortstop to start in the All-Star game since Luis Aparicio in 1970. In the game, Anderson went 1-for-2, with a single in the 4th.

On July 30, 2022, Anderson was thrown out of the game by umpire Nick Mahrley after arguing balls and strikes. Anderson became irate and seemingly bumped the umpire's cap with his own helmet. MLB suspended Anderson for three games and fined him an undisclosed amount for making illegal contact with an umpire. The suspension was reduced from three games to two on appeal. On August 9, Anderson was placed on the IL with a torn hand ligament, ending his season. Overall in 2022, Anderson appeared in just 79 games, albeit with a .301 batting average, as well as six home runs and 25 RBIs.

==== 2023 ====
In 2023, Anderson represented Team USA in the World Baseball Classic. In Team USA's third game of pool play against Canada, Anderson played at second base, the first time he had played the position in his professional career.

Anderson missed playing time in April due to a knee injury. He struggled in the first half of the season as he batted .223 by the All-Star break. Anderson also went homerless until July 29 against the Cleveland Guardians when he hit his first home run of the season and his first homer in 379 days off of Logan Allen.

On August 5, Anderson instigated a bench-clearing brawl with José Ramírez of the Cleveland Guardians after Anderson applied a tag to Ramírez during a game. They exchanged punches, with Ramirez knocking Anderson down to the ground. After the game, Ramírez said that Anderson had been "disrespecting the game for a while now". Anderson was ejected from the game and suspended for six games, Ramirez for three. On September 3, Anderson notched his 1,000th career hit with a lead off double off of Detroit Tigers starter Tarik Skubal.

In 2023, Anderson had the lowest isolated power in the AL (.051) and hit the highest percentage of ground balls in the league (61.1%), while batting .245/.286/.296 (the lowest slugging percentage in the AL), with an OPS of .582 (the lowest in the AL). On November 4, the White Sox declined their $14 million option on Anderson for the 2024 season, instead paying him a $1 million buyout, making him a free agent.

=== Miami Marlins ===
On February 24, 2024, Anderson signed a one-year, $5 million contract with the Miami Marlins. In 65 games for the Marlins, he batted .214/.237/.226 with no home runs, nine RBI, and four stolen bases. On July 2, Anderson was designated for assignment by Miami. He was released by the organization on July 5.

=== Los Angeles Angels ===
On February 4, 2025, Anderson finalized a minor league contract with the Los Angeles Angels. On March 25, the Angels selected Anderson's contract, putting him on the Opening Day roster. In 31 appearances, he batted .205/.258/.241 with three RBI and one stolen base. On May 28, Anderson was designated for assignment by the Angels. He was released by the team on May 30.

On August 10, 2026, Anderson announced his retirement from professional baseball. The White Sox announced that they would honor him before their game on September 17.

== Personal life ==
Anderson and his wife, Bria (née Evans), have two daughters and a son. As of 2020, the family resided in Chicago year-round. In 2023, he acknowledged that he fathered a son outside of his marriage.

In 2017, Anderson's best friend was shot and killed in Tuscaloosa; they were godfathers to each other's daughters. This inspired Anderson to create a charitable foundation, called Anderson's League of Leaders, with the goal of supporting children in school and at home. The foundation financially supports interventions in various causes, including bullying and gun violence. Anderson has been known for doing charity work around the south and west sides of Chicago, which he calls his "adopted hometown". In 2019, Anderson brought 75 kids from the south side of Chicago to the theater to watch the film 42 (2013), a biopic about baseball player Jackie Robinson.
