= Codi Heuer =

American baseball player (born 1996)

Free agent
- Pitcher
- Born: July 3, 1996 (age 30); Missoula, Montana, U.S.
- Bats: Right Throws: Right

MLB debut
- July 24, 2020, for the Chicago White Sox

MLB statistics (through 2026 season)
- Win–loss record: 10–5
- Earned run average: 3.76
- Strikeouts: 92
- Stats at Baseball Reference

Teams
- Chicago White Sox (2020–2021); Chicago Cubs (2021); Texas Rangers (2025); Detroit Tigers (2025); Cleveland Guardians (2026)

Codi Dalton Heuer (/ˈhɔɪər/ HOY-ər; born July 3, 1996) is an American professional baseball pitcher who is a free agent. He has previously played in MLB for the Chicago White Sox, Chicago Cubs, Texas Rangers, Detroit Tigers, and Cleveland Guardians. Heuer played college baseball at Wichita State University.

== Amateur career ==
Heuer was born and raised in Missoula, Montana, before moving to Fort Collins, Colorado before he began high school. Following the move, he attended Fossil Ridge High School in Fort Collins. In 2015, his senior year, he threw a complete game shutout in which he struck out 17 batters, a school record.

He went undrafted in the 2015 Major League Baseball draft, and enrolled at Wichita State University where he played college baseball for the Shockers. In 2016, his freshman season at Wichita State, he appeared in 21 games (making two starts) in which he went 1–1 with a 9.12 ERA in 24 2/3 innings, and as a sophomore in 2017, he pitched to a 2–2 record and 4.42 ERA in 38 2/3 innings. In 2018, his junior year, he was Wichita State's Friday night starter, going 6–5 with a 4.31 ERA over 16 games (15 starts).

== Professional career ==
=== Chicago White Sox ===
After his junior year, Heuer was selected by the Chicago White Sox in the sixth round of the 2018 Major League Baseball draft. He signed and made his professional debut with the Great Falls Voyagers. He made 14 starts, going 0–1 with a 4.74 ERA over 38 innings, as the Voyagers won the Pioneer League crown. In 2019, he moved to the bullpen, and began the year with the Winston-Salem Dash before being promoted to the Birmingham Barons in June. Over 42 relief appearances between the two clubs, Heuer went 6–4 with a 2.39 ERA, striking out 65 over 67 2/3 innings.

On July 23, 2020, it was announced that Heuer had been named to the White Sox 2020 Opening Day roster. He made his MLB debut the next night against the Minnesota Twins, striking out one and pitching a scoreless inning. With the 2020 Chicago White Sox, Heuer appeared in 21 games, compiling a 3-0 record with 1.52 ERA and 25 strikeouts in 23 2/3 innings pitched. For the 2021 White Sox, Heuer went 4-1 with a 5.12 ERA and 39 strikeouts over 38 2/3 innings.

=== Chicago Cubs ===
On July 30, 2021, Heuer was traded along with Nick Madrigal to the Chicago Cubs for Craig Kimbrel. Heuer appeared in 25 games for the Cubs in which he went 3-3 with a 3.14 ERA and 17 strikeouts over 28 2/3 innings. On March 8, 2022, Heuer underwent Tommy John surgery, ending his 2022 season before it began.

On January 13, 2023, Heuer agreed to a one-year, $785,000 contract with the Cubs, avoiding salary arbitration. After 15 rehab appearances for the Triple–A Iowa Cubs, it was announced on June 24 that Heuer would undergo season–ending surgery to address an elbow fracture he had suffered earlier in the week. He was non-tendered and became a free agent on November 17.

=== Texas Rangers ===
On April 6, 2024, Heuer signed a minor league contract with the Texas Rangers. He returned to action in 2025 with the Triple-A Round Rock Express, posting a 2-1 record and 3.27 ERA with 25 strikeouts across 19 appearances.

On June 1, 2025, Texas selected Heuer’s contract and added him to their major league roster. He made one appearance for the Rangers, allowing one run across 1 1/3 innings against the Tampa Bay Rays.

=== Detroit Tigers ===
On July 31, 2025, Heuer was traded to the Detroit Tigers in exchange for cash considerations. In two appearances for Detroit, he recorded a 5.40 ERA with four strikeouts across 3 1/3 innings pitched. On September 18, Heuer was released by the Tigers.

=== Cleveland Guardians ===
On December 22, 2025, Heuer signed a minor league contract with the Cleveland Guardians. On March 22, 2026, the Guardians selected Heuer's contract and subsequently optioned him to the Triple-A Columbus Clippers. He made eight appearances for Cleveland, recording a 4.66 ERA with six strikeouts across 9 2/3 innings pitched.

=== Baltimore Orioles ===
On August 1, 2026, the Guardians traded Heuer and Bo Naylor to the Milwaukee Brewers in exchange for Craig Yoho and Blake Perkins. Two days later, he was traded to the Baltimore Orioles in exchange for cash considerations. The Orioles assigned Heuer to the Triple-A Norfolk Tides with whom he made 12 relief appearances and did not give up a run. On October 31, he was sent outright to Triple-A Norfolk Tides. He elected free agency on November 2.

== Personal life ==
Heuer is a cousin of National Football League linebacker Troy Andersen.
