= Steele Walker =

American baseball player (born 1996)

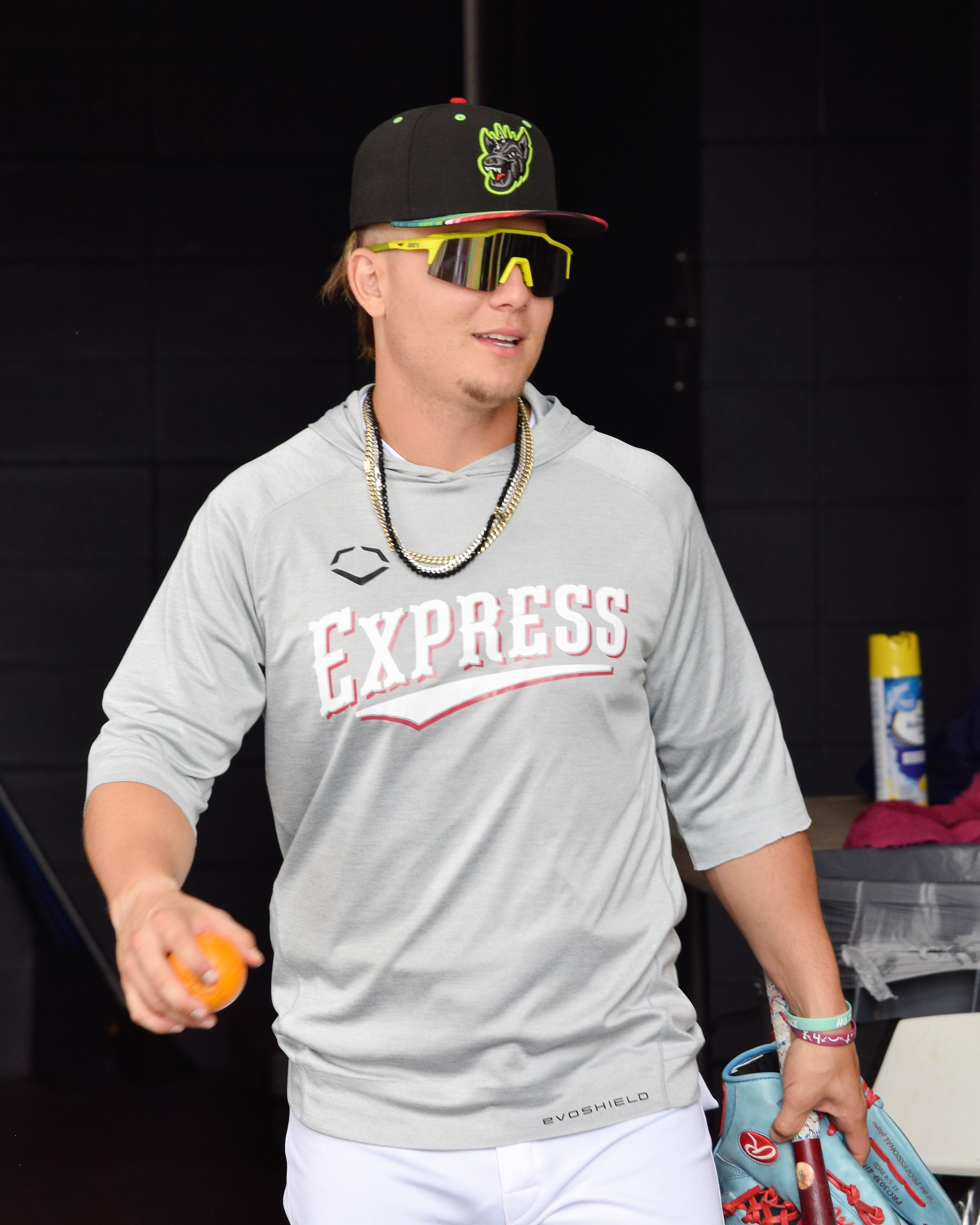
- Walker with the Round Rock Express in 2022
- Outfielder
- Born: July 30, 1996 (age 30); Mount Pleasant, Texas, U.S.
- Batted: Left Threw: Left

MLB debut
- June 5, 2022, for the Texas Rangers

Last MLB appearance
- June 10, 2022, for the Texas Rangers

MLB statistics
- Batting average: .071
- Home runs: 1
- Runs batted in: 1
- Stats at Baseball Reference

Teams
- Texas Rangers (2022)

Steele Simons Walker (born July 30, 1996) is an American former professional baseball outfielder. He played college baseball at the University of Oklahoma, and was selected in the second round of the 2018 Major League Baseball draft. He played in Major League Baseball (MLB) for the Texas Rangers.

== Amateur career ==
Walker attended Prosper High School in Prosper, Texas. He played college baseball at the University of Oklahoma for the Oklahoma Sooners. As a freshman at Oklahoma in 2016, Walker played in 57 games, hitting .290/.352/.414 with three home runs and 32 runs batted in (RBI). After the season, he played for the Wisconsin Woodchucks of the Northwoods League. As a sophomore in 2017, he started 59 games, batting .333/.413/.541 with eight home runs and 51 RBI. After the season, he played for the United States collegiate national team and for the Brewster Whitecaps of the Cape Cod League. As a junior in 2018, Walker finished with a .352 batting average with 13 home runs and 53 RBI; a strained right oblique muscle kept him out of the team's final eight games. He was a semi-finalist for the Golden Spikes Award and was named to the All-Big 12 Conference's First Team.

== Professional career ==
=== Chicago White Sox ===
Considered one of the top prospects for the 2018 Major League Baseball draft, he was selected in the second round, 46th overall by the Chicago White Sox. Walker signed with the White Sox for $2 million and made his professional debut with the AZL White Sox. He was promoted to the Great Falls Voyagers and the Kannapolis Intimidators during the season. In 44 games between the three clubs, Walker hit .209/.271/.342 with five home runs and 21 RBIs.

Walker returned to Kannapolis to begin the 2019 season. In late April, Walker was promoted to the Winston-Salem Dash of the High–A Carolina League after batting .365 in 20 games. On June 14, Steele hit for the cycle. He spent the remainder of the season with the Dash, slashing .269/.346/.426 with ten home runs and 51 RBIs over 100 games.

=== Texas Rangers ===
On December 11, 2019, Walker was traded to the Texas Rangers in for outfielder Nomar Mazara. Walker did not play in 2020 due to the cancellation of the Minor League Baseball season because of the COVID-19 pandemic.

Walker opened the 2021 season with the Frisco RoughRiders of the Double-A Central league. He was promoted to the Round Rock Express of the Triple-A West league on August 5. Between the two levels, he hit a combined .241/.308/.400 with 15 home runs (none against left-handers) and 61 RBI. Walker returned to Round Rock to open the 2022 season.

On June 5, 2022, Texas selected Walker's contract to the active roster and promoted him to the major leagues for the first time. He made his MLB debut that day versus the Seattle Mariners. On June 7, Walker hit his first career home run as his first major league hit off of Cal Quantrill of the Cleveland Guardians.

In 14 at bats with the Rangers, he hit .071/.188/.286. On August 4, 2022, Walker was designated for assignment.

In the minor leagues to that point, on defense he had played 147 games in center field, 71 games in right field, and 55 games in left field.

=== San Francisco Giants ===
On August 7, 2022, Walker was claimed off waivers by the San Francisco Giants. The Giants assigned him to the Triple-A upon acquiring him. Walker was designated for assignment on August 17. He cleared waivers and was sent outright to the Triple-A Sacramento River Cats.

=== Detroit Tigers ===
On November 15, 2022, Walker was traded to the Detroit Tigers for cash considerations. He split the 2023 season between the rookie–level Florida Complex League Tigers, High–A West Michigan Whitecaps, and Triple–A Toledo Mud Hens. In 28 total games, he accumulated a .202/.288/.317 batting line with 2 home runs and 14 RBI. On July 10, 2023, Walker was released by the Tigers organization.
