= Yolmer Sánchez =

Venezuelan baseball player (born 1992)

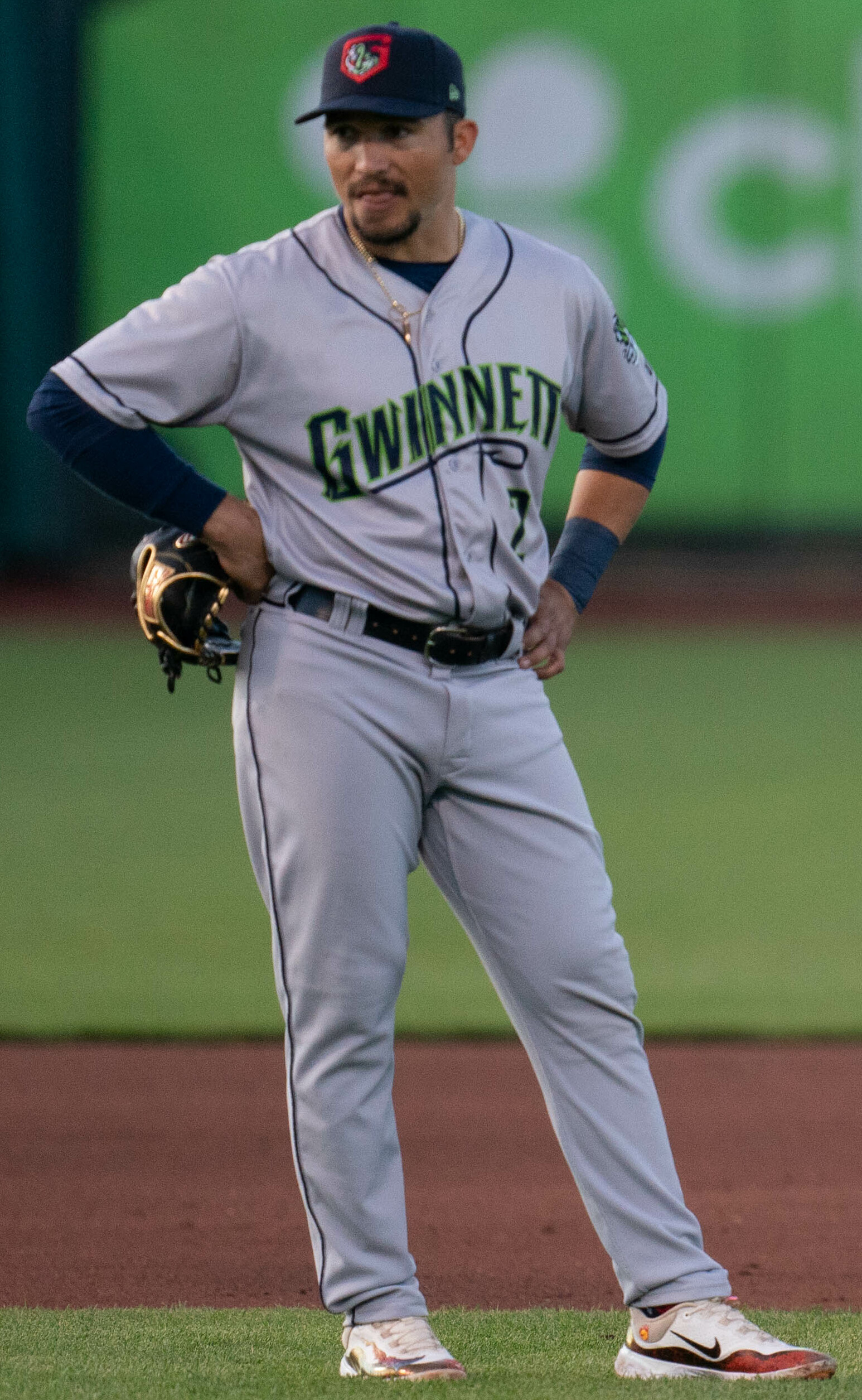
- Sánchez with the Gwinnett Stripers in 2023

Free agent
- Infielder
- Born: June 29, 1992 (age 34); Maracay, Venezuela
- Bats: Switch Throws: Right

MLB debut
- July 13, 2014, for the Chicago White Sox

MLB statistics (through 2022 season)
- Batting average: .243
- Home runs: 32
- Runs batted in: 217
- Stats at Baseball Reference

Teams
- Chicago White Sox (2014–2020); Boston Red Sox (2022); New York Mets (2022)

Career highlights and awards
- Gold Glove Award (2019)

Yolmer Carlos Javier Sánchez (born June 29, 1992) is a Venezuelan professional baseball infielder who is a free agent. He made his Major League Baseball (MLB) debut in 2014 with the Chicago White Sox, and has also played in MLB for the Boston Red Sox and New York Mets. Prior to the 2017 season, he was known as Carlos Sánchez. He led the American League in triples in 2018, and won a Gold Glove Award in 2019 at second base.

== Career ==
=== Chicago White Sox ===
Sánchez signed with the Chicago White Sox as an international free agent in 2009. He played in the Dominican Summer League (DSL) for the DSL White Sox in 2009 (playing shortstop primarily) and 2010 (playing third base primarily). The next season, playing second base primarily, he split the year between the Bristol White Sox of the Rookie-level Appalachian League and the Kannapolis Intimidators of the Single-A South Atlantic League, finishing the year batting.286/.354/.343 batting average with 30 runs batted in and 48 runs scored in 68 games.

During the 2012 season, Sánchez moved quickly through the White Sox system. He started the season with the High-A Winston-Salem Dash, then moved to the Double-A Birmingham Barons, and eventually the Triple-A Charlotte Knights. He was named to appear in the 2012 All-Star Futures Game while playing for the Winston-Salem in the High-A Carolina League, and was named a Carolina League Post-Season All Star. Sánchez hit a combined.323/.378/.403, 169 hits, 1 home run, 25 doubles, 7 triples, 79 runs, 56 RBI, 26 stolen bases in 133 games. He was named an MILB.com Organization All Star.

The White Sox invited Sánchez to spring training as a non-roster invitee in 2013, and he ranked as the White Sox' number four prospect. Sánchez spent the entire 2013 season at Triple-A Charlotte, where he batted.241/.293/.296 in 432 at bats, 50 runs, 20 doubles, 2 triples, no home runs, 28 runs batted in, 29 walks, 76 strikeouts and 16 SBs.

Sánchez was added to the 40-man roster on November 20, 2013. On July 13, 2014, the White Sox promoted Sánchez to the MLB roster and he made his MLB debut that same day going 0-for-5 with two strikeouts. Sanchez was sent down to Charlotte after the game, but was recalled to Chicago on August 22, after the White Sox traded Gordon Beckham. In 2014 with the White Sox, he batted.250/.269/.300 in 100 at bats. He was named an MILB.com Organization All Star.

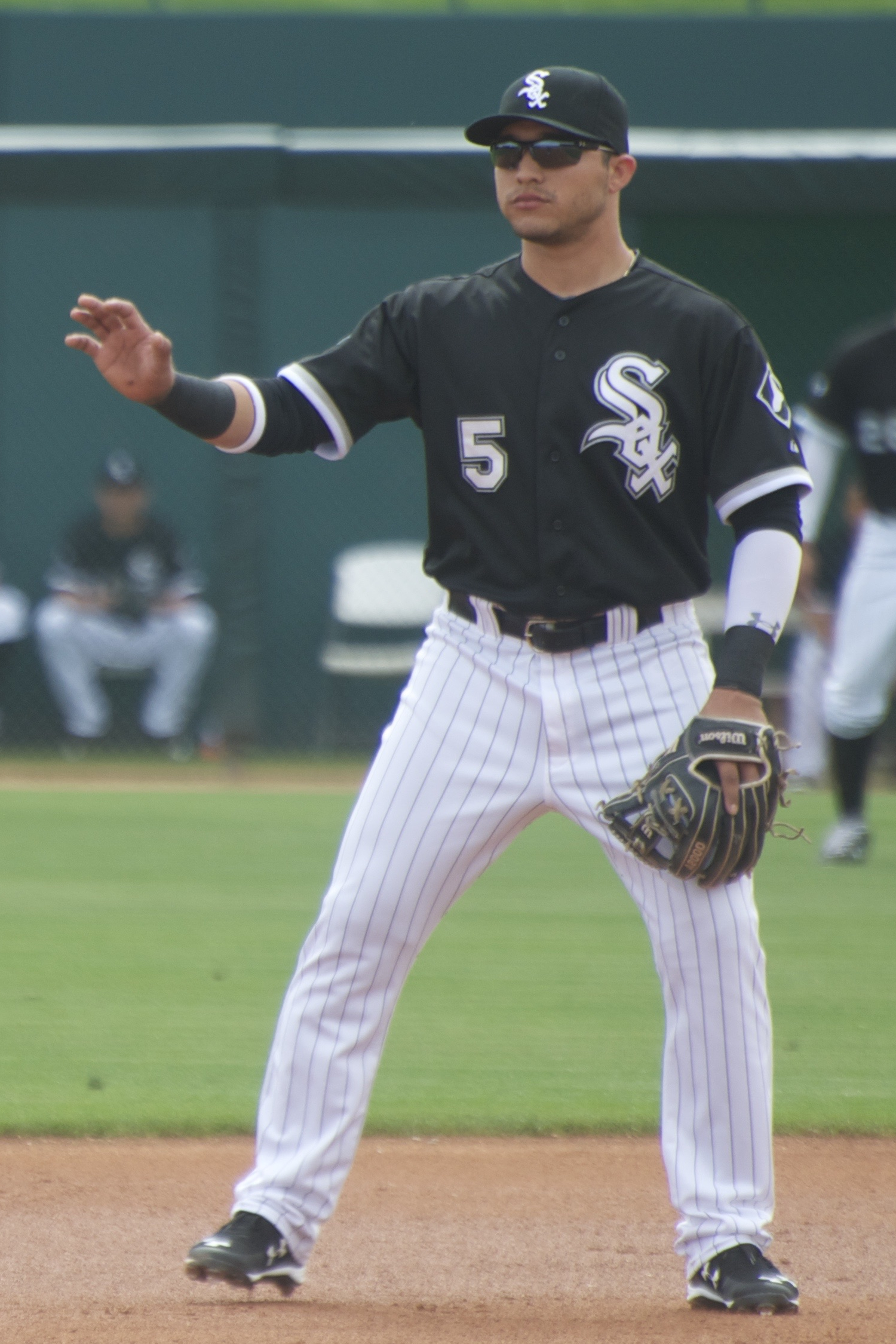
Sánchez with the White Sox in 2015

In 2015 with the White Sox, he batted .224/.268/.326 in 389 at bats, and in 2016 he batted .208/.236/.357 in 154 at bats.

Sánchez announced that he would go by his first name, Yolmer, starting from the 2017 season, rather than his middle name of Carlos. In doing so, he became the first player named Yolmer in MLB history. In 2017, he batted .267/.319/.413 with a career-high 12 home runs in 484 at bats, and was second in the AL with 8 triples.

In 2018, playing third base primarily, he batted .242/.306/.372 in 600 at bats with a career-high 14 stolen bases, and led the AL with 10 triples. He received the MLBPAA White Sox Heart and Hustle Award.

In 2019, playing second base primarily, Sánchez batted .252/.318/.321 in 496 at bats with two home runs and 42 RBIs, with the lowest slugging percentage and isolated power (0.69) in the major leagues, and the highest opposite field percentage of all major league batters (34.2%). On defense, he made 416 assists, turned 108 double plays and had an 11 Defensive Runs Saved (DRS) rating, all best in the American League among second basemen. He won a Gold Glove Award at second base.

Sánchez was released on November 25, 2019.

=== San Francisco Giants ===
Sánchez signed a minor league contract with the San Francisco Giants on January 31, 2020. He did not play in their farm system due to cancelation of the 2020 minor-league season. He was released by the Giants organization on August 21, 2020.

=== Chicago White Sox (second stint) ===
On August 25, 2020, Sánchez signed a minor league contract with the Chicago White Sox organization. On August 31, he was added to the White Sox' 40-man roster. Overall with the 2020 Chicago White Sox, Sánchez batted .313 with one home run and one RBI in 11 games.

=== Baltimore Orioles ===
On October 30, 2020, Sánchez was claimed off waivers by the Baltimore Orioles. On March 27, 2021, he was designated for assignment following the acquisition of Adam Plutko. On March 30, Sánchez was granted his release by the Orioles.

=== Atlanta Braves ===
On March 31, 2021, Sánchez signed a minor league contract with the Atlanta Braves organization. In 102 games with the Triple-A Gwinnett Braves, he batted .216 with nine home runs and 35 RBIs. He elected free agency on November 7, 2021.

=== Boston Red Sox ===
On February 9, 2022, Sánchez signed a minor league contract with the Boston Red Sox that included an invitation to spring training. He began the season in Triple-A with the Worcester Red Sox. Sánchez was added to Boston's active roster on June 27 for a series in Toronto, and appeared in one game for Boston. He was returned to Worcester on June 30 and removed from the 40-man roster. He was re-added to Boston's active roster on July 22, then was designated for assignment on August 16. In 14 games for Boston, Sánchez batted .108 (4-for-37) with two RBIs.

=== New York Mets ===
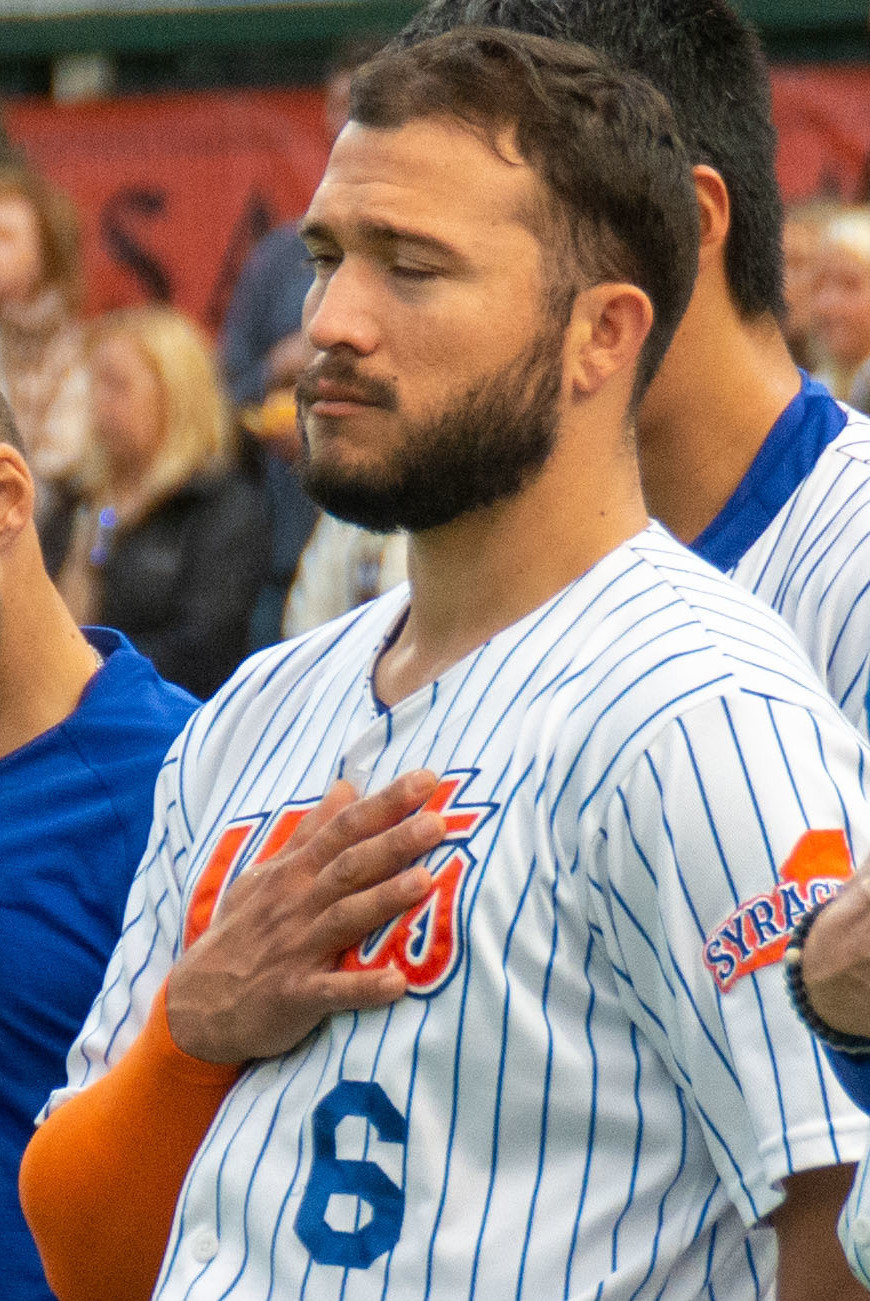
Sánchez with the Syracuse Mets in 2022

On August 18, 2022, Sánchez was claimed off waivers by the New York Mets. On August 27, Sánchez was designated for assignment. With the Mets, he appeared defensively in three games but did not have a plate appearance. He cleared waivers and was sent outright to the Triple–A Syracuse Mets on August 30.

=== Atlanta Braves (second stint) ===
On January 24, 2023, Sánchez signed a minor league contract with the Atlanta Braves organization. He participated in major league spring training activities, and was assigned to minor league camp before the regular season began. In 117 games for the Triple–A Gwinnett Stripers, Sánchez hit .236/.381/.350 with 8 home runs and 62 RBI. He elected free agency following the season on November 6.

=== New York Mets (second stint) ===
On January 16, 2024, Sánchez signed a minor league contract with the New York Mets organization. In 111 appearances for the Triple-A Syracuse Mets, he batted .226/.346/.393 with nine home runs, 52 RBI, and nine stolen bases. Sánchez elected free agency following the season on November 4.

=== Los Angeles Angels ===
On February 4, 2025, Sánchez signed a minor league contract with the Los Angeles Angels. He made 120 appearances for the Triple-A Salt Lake Bees, slashing .246/.357/.329 with four home runs, 36 RBI, and nine stolen bases. Sánchez elected free agency following the season on November 6.

On December 8, 2025, Sánchez re-signed with the Angels on a new minor league contract. In 125 games with Triple-A Salt Lake Bees he batted .274/.375/.407 with 8 home runs, 78 RBIs and 20 stolen bases. He elected free agency on November 2.

== See also ==
- List of Major League Baseball players from Venezuela
