= Great Falls Voyagers =

American minor-league professional baseball team

- Founded in 1969; Great Falls, Montana
Team logo
Cap insignia

Minor league affiliations
- Class: Independent (from 2021)
- Previous classes: Rookie Advanced (1991–2020); Rookie (1969–1990)
- League: Pioneer League (1969–present)

Major league affiliations
- Team: Independent (from 2021)
- Previous teams: Chicago White Sox (2003–2020); Los Angeles Dodgers (1984–2002); San Francisco Giants (1969–1983)

Minor league titles
- League titles (10): 1971; 1975; 1976; 1988; 1989; 1990; 2002; 2008; 2011; 2018
- Division titles (13): 1985; 1988; 1989; 1990; 1991; 1997; 2000; 2002; 2004; 2007; 2008; 2017; 2018

Team data
- Name: Great Falls Voyagers (2008–present)
- Previous names: Great Falls White Sox (2003–2007); Great Falls Dodgers (1984–2002); Great Falls Giants (1969–1983)
- Colors: Black, red, green, gray, white
- Mascots: Orbit
- Ballpark: Centene Stadium (1969–present)
- Owner(s)/ Operator(s): Enbar, Inc.
- General manager: Colin McGuinn
- Manager: Sean Repay
- Website: gfvoyagers.com

The Great Falls Voyagers are an independent baseball team of the Pioneer League, which is not affiliated with Major League Baseball (MLB) but is an MLB Partner League. They are located in Great Falls, Montana, and play their home games at Centene Stadium.

The team has played continuously in the Pioneer League since 1969, and a Great Falls team previously played in the league from 1948 to 1963. In conjunction with a contraction of Minor League Baseball in 2021, the Pioneer League was converted from an MLB-affiliated Rookie Advanced league to an independent baseball league and granted status as an MLB Partner League, with Great Falls continuing as members. Prior to this, the Voyagers had been affiliated with the San Francisco Giants (1969–1983), Los Angeles Dodgers (1984–2002), and Chicago White Sox (2003–2020).

== Voyagers ==
The Voyagers name refers to the Mariana UFO incident in August 1950 when Nicholas "Nick" Mariana, the general manager of the Great Falls Electrics, saw two spinning objects approaching at a seemingly high speed. Mariana recorded 16 seconds of footage of the unidentified flying objects at Legion Park.

== Playoffs ==
- 2018: Defeated Billings 2-0 in semifinals; defeated Grand Junction 2-0 to win league championship.
- 2017: Defeated Missoula 2-0 in semifinals; lost to Ogden 2-1 in league championship.
- 2016: Lost to Billings 2-0 in semifinals.
- 2014: Lost to Billings 2-0 in semifinals.
- 2013: Lost to Helena 2-0 in semifinals.
- 2012: Lost to Missoula 2-1 in semifinals.
- 2011: Defeated Missoula 2-1 in semifinals; defeated Ogden 2-1 to win league championship.
- 2010: Lost to Helena 2-1 in semifinals.
- 2009: Lost to Missoula 2-1 in semifinals.
- 2008: Defeated Orem 2-1 to win league championship.
- 2007: Lost to Orem 2-0 in finals.
- 2002: Defeated Provo 2-1 to win league championship.
- 2000: Lost to Idaho Falls 2-0 in finals.
- 1997: Lost to Billings 2-0 in finals.

== Pete Rose Jr. ==
On December 18, 2012, Pete Rose Jr., the son of major league career hits leader Pete Rose, was named the Voyagers' manager. He replaced Ryan Newman. Under Rose Jr. the Voyagers held a 48-28 record and made it to the Pioneer League playoffs where they were eliminated by the Helena Brewers. On January 20, 2014, it was announced that then hitting coach Charlie Poe would manage the Voyagers for the 2014 season, ending Rose Jr.'s tenure as manager.

== Great Falls players with MLB experience ==
=== Hall of Fame members ===
- Pedro Martinez 1990

=== Notable alumni ===
1969
Gary Thomasson, Elías Sosa, Ed Goodson, Horace Speed, Skip Pitlock, Steve Ontiveros, Mike Phillips
1970
Butch Metzger, Doug Capilla, John D'Acquisto
1971
Frank Riccelli, Willie Prall, Steven Stroughter, Gregg Thayer
1972
Ed Halicki, Bob Knepper, Gary Alexander, Rob Dressler, Reggie Walton, Fred Kuhaulua, Terry Cornutt
1973
Tommy Toms, Johnnie LeMaster, Jack Clark, Pete Falcone, Jeff Little, Ed Plank
1974
John Henry Johnson, Guy Sularz
1975
Alan Wirth, Jeff Yurak, Mike Rowland, Jose Barrios, Rick Murray
1976
Joe Strain Jr, Bob Brenly, Casey Parsons
1977
Phil Huffman, DeWayne Buice, Bob Kearney, Tom Runnells, Jeff Stember, Bob Tufts
1978
John Rabb, Rob Deer
1979
Scott Garrelts, Tom O'Malley, Frank Williams, Chris Brown, Randy Kutcher
1980
Alan Fowlkes, Randy Gomez, Jessie Reid, Mark Dempsey
1981
Matt Nokes, Mark Grant, Phil Ouellette
1982
Randy Bockus, Pat Larkin
1983
Eric King, Mike Aldrete, Charlie Hayes, John Burkett, Alonzo Powell, Ángel Escobar
1984
Darren Holmes, Tim Scott, Wayne Kirby, Luis Lopez, Jeff Nelson
1985
Mike Devereaux, Jack Savage, Mike Huff, John Wetteland
1986
Kevin Campbell, Dave Hansen, Mike Munoz
1987
Rafael Bournigal, Dennis Springer, Tony Barron, Zak Shinall
1988
Eric Karros, José Offerman, Mike James, Jeff Hartsock, Jerry Brooks, Eddie Pye
1989
Jamie McAndrew, Matt Howard, Tom Goodwin
1990
Pedro Martínez, Raúl Mondesí, Mike Mimbs, Garey Ingram
1991
Henry Blanco, Roberto Mejía, Juan Castro, José Parra, Rick Gorecki, Todd Williams, Ken Huckaby, Willis Otáñez
1992
Roger Cedeño, Félix Rodríguez, Chad Zerbe, Chris Latham
1993
Wilton Guerrero
1994
Dennys Reyes, Adam Riggs, Nate Bland, Ricky Stone
1995
Pedro Feliciano, Luke Prokopec, Ángel Peña
1996
Brad Thomas
1997
Víctor Álvarez, Luke Allen
1998
Jorge Piedra
1999
Shane Victorino, Jason Repko
2000
Ricardo Rodríguez, Willy Aybar, Reggie Abercrombie, Joel Hanrahan, Agustín Montero
2002
Jonathan Broxton, James Loney, Joel Guzmán, Eric Stults, Delwyn Young, Eric Hull, Arturo López
2003
Brandon McCarthy, Brian Anderson, Boone Logan, Sean Tracey, Chris Young, Ryan Sweeney, Fernando Hernández, Tom Jacquez
2004
Donny Lucy, Adam Russell, Jack Egbert, Jay Marshall
2005
Brandon Allen, Chris Getz, Clayton Richard, Carlos Torres
2006
Chris Carter
2007
John Ely, Aaron Poreda
2008
Eduardo Escobar, Daniel Hudson, Brent Morel
2009
Trayce Thompson
2010
David Holmberg, Addison Reed, Taylor Thompson, Andy Wilkins
2011
Chris Devenski, Erik Johnson, Kevan Smith, Scott Snodgress
2012
Chris Beck, Micah Johnson, Mike Marjama
2013
Adam Engel, Brad Goldberg, Jacob May
2014
Brandon Brennan, Aaron Bummer, Jace Fry, Zach Thompson
2016
Bernardo Flores Jr, Matt Foster
2017
Luis Gonzalez, Carlos Pérez
2018
Romy González, Codi Heuer, Davis Martin, Konnor Pilkington, Lenyn Sosa, Bennett Sousa, Jonathan Stiever, Steele Walker
2019
McKinley Moore, Sammy Peralta

== Roster ==
Great Falls Voyagers roster
Active (25-man) roster	Coaching staff
Pitchers: 13 Daniel Batcher; 8 Wyatt Cameron; 36 Josh Collett; 30 CJ Czerwinski; 17 Danny Galvan; 38 Luke Helton; 24 Robert Kelley; 18 Sam Lavin; 12 Nick Marshall; 39 Brendan Moody; 28 Nolan Pender; 25 Kelvin Perez; 11 Zach Voelker; Utility players: 4 Jordan Hamberg; Catchers: 7 Jeff Nicol; 37 Jedier Hernandez; Infielders: 5 Armando Albert; 10 Trey Cruz; 9 AJ Fritz; 26 Roman Kuntz; 1 Luis Carlos Moreno; 34 Frank Podkul; 6 Kody Putman; 27 Anthony Swenda; Outfielders: 2 Emilio Corona; 23 Freddy Rojas Jr.; 21 Tommy Specht	Manager: -- Sean Repay; Coaches: -- Mark Ossanna (hitting); -- Tyler Pollock (bench); -- Chuck Shirley (pitching); Disabled list; ‡ Inactive list; § Suspended list; updated July 7, 2025 Transactions
