= Centene Stadium (Great Falls, Montana) =

Baseball park in Great Falls, Montana

- Location in the United States Location in Montana
- Interactive map of Centene Stadium
- Former names: Legion Park (1940-2007)
- Address: 1015 25th St. N
- Location: Great Falls, Montana, United States
- Coordinates: 47°31′0.91″N 111°15′34.08″W
- Owner: City of Great Falls
- Operator: Great Falls Baseball Club, Inc.
- Capacity: 4,000
- Surface: Natural grass
- Field size: Left field: 328 feet (100 m); Center field: 415 feet (126 m); Right field: 335 feet (102 m)

Construction
- Opened: 1940; 86 years ago
- Renovated: 2005
- Expanded: 1945

Tenants
- Great Falls Voyagers (1969–present); Great Falls Electrics (1940–1963); Great Falls Chargers AA; Great Falls Chargers A Great Falls Chargers B

Centene Stadium is a stadium located in Great Falls, Montana. It is named for the Centene Corporation. which paid for the naming rights to the stadium. Primarily a baseball park, it is the home field of the Great Falls Voyagers independent minor league baseball team.

Built 86 years ago in 1940, it has a seating capacity of 4,000, a picnic area, and a barbecue area. Field dimensions are 335 feet (102 m) to right field, 328 feet (100 m) to left field, 415 feet (126 m) to center field, and 368 feet (112 m) to each power alley. Aligned northeast (home plate to second base), the elevation of the natural grass field is approximately 3,400 feet (1,035 m) above sea level.

Just southeast of the Black Eagle Dam on the Missouri River, the baseball park is owned by the city and leased to the Great Falls Baseball Club, Inc., a non-profit organization. In exchange for maintaining the park and updates, the city requires that the three local high school (American Legion affiliated) teams be allowed to practice and play in the stadium as long as it does not interfere with the operations of the Voyagers.

The three American Legion teams that play in the park are the Great Falls Chargers AA, Chargers A, and Chargers B. The previous names of these teams where the Stallions, Electrics, and Chargers; the programs merged into one organization, thus the new name.
