= Jonathan Stiever =

American baseball player (born 1997)

- Pitcher
- Born: May 12, 1997 (age 29); Cedarburg, Wisconsin, U.S.
- Batted: Right Threw: Right

MLB debut
- September 13, 2020, for the Chicago White Sox

Last MLB appearance
- April 25, 2021, for the Chicago White Sox

MLB statistics
- Win–loss record: 0–1
- Earned run average: 14.21
- Strikeouts: 3
- Stats at Baseball Reference

Teams
- Chicago White Sox (2020–2021)

Jonathan Stiever (born May 12, 1997) is an American former professional baseball pitcher. He played college baseball at Indiana University and was selected by the Chicago White Sox in the fifth round of the 2018 Major League Baseball draft. He made his Major League Baseball (MLB) debut in 2020.

== Amateur career ==
Stiever attended Cedarburg High School in Cedarburg, Wisconsin, where he played football and baseball, earning All-State honors in both sports for his senior year. In 2015, his senior baseball season, he went 7–1 with a 1.90 ERA. Undrafted in the 2015 Major League Baseball draft, he enrolled at Indiana University where he played college baseball.

In 2016, Stiever's freshman year at Indiana, he made 18 appearances (four starts), going 1–1 with a 2.47 ERA while striking out thirty over forty innings of work. That summer, he played in the New England Collegiate Baseball League with the Vermont Mountaineers. As a sophomore at Indiana in 2017, he started 14 games, pitching to a 4–4 record and a 4.13 ERA over 77 innings. Following the year, he played in the Cape Cod Baseball League with the Brewster Whitecaps. In 2018, Stiever's junior season, he went 5–6 with a 3.41 ERA over 16 starts, striking out 97 over 100 innings. After the season, he was selected by the Chicago White Sox in the fifth round of the 2018 Major League Baseball draft.

== Professional career ==
Stiever signed with the White Sox and made his professional debut with the Great Falls Voyagers, going 0–1 with a 4.18 ERA over 13 starts. In 2019, he began the year with the Kannapolis Intimidators before earning a promotion to the Winston-Salem Dash in June. Over 26 starts between both clubs, Stiever went 10–10 with a 3.48 ERA, striking out 154 batters over 145 innings. He was named MLB Pipeline's White Sox Pitching Prospect of the Year.

Stiever was called up to the major leagues on September 13, 2020, and started against the Detroit Tigers that same day. He pitched 3 2/3 innings, gave up two hits, walked two, gave up one run, and struck out three.

To begin the 2021 season, Stiever was assigned to the Charlotte Knights. He was recalled by the White Sox on April 25, appeared in that night's game and gave up three earned runs without recording an out, and was optioned back to Charlotte the next day; he did not make another appearance for the White Sox that season. Over 17 starts with Charlotte, Stiever went 5–5 with a 5.84 ERA and 88 strikeouts over 74 innings; he underwent surgery on his latissimus dorsi muscle in August, ending his season prematurely.

Stiever was placed on the 60-day IL to begin the season on March 24, 2022, and did not make an appearance for the major league club as he continued to rehab throughout the season. On April 10, 2023, Stiever was removed from the 40-man roster and sent outright to Triple-A Charlotte. He made two starts for Charlotte, posting a 6.75 ERA with two strikeouts over four innings pitched. Stiever underwent lat surgery in April, and missed the remainder of the season as a result.

Stiever did not make an appearance for the White Sox organization in 2024 due to injury. Stiever retired from professional baseball on December 16, 2024.
