= Arizona Complex League White Sox =

- (1998–2002, 2014–present); Phoenix, Arizona; previously in Tucson, Arizona (1998–2000)

Minor league affiliations
- Class: Rookie
- League: Arizona Complex League
- Division: Central Division
- Previous leagues: Arizona League (1998–2002, 2014–2020)

Major league affiliations
- Team: Chicago White Sox

Team data
- Name: ACL White Sox
- Previous names: AZL White Sox (1998–2002, 2014–2020)
- Ballpark: Camelback Ranch
- Previous parks: Tucson Electric Park (1998–2000)
- Manager: Danny Gonzalez

The Arizona Complex League White Sox are a Rookie-level affiliate of the Chicago White Sox, competing in the Arizona Complex League of Minor League Baseball. The team plays its home games at Camelback Ranch in Phoenix, Arizona. The team is composed mainly of players who are in their first year of professional baseball either as draftees or non-drafted free agents from the United States, Canada, Dominican Republic, Venezuela, and other countries.

== History ==
The team first competed in the Arizona League (AZL) from 1998 to 2002. The team played at facilities in Tucson from 1998 to 2000, and Phoenix from 2001 to 2002. The team was formed after the major-league Chicago White Sox moved their spring training headquarters from Sarasota, Florida, to Tucson Electric Park after the 1997 season. The move effectively transplanted their Rookie-level Gulf Coast League White Sox across the country to the Arizona League. The AZL White Sox compiled a record of 115–161 (.417) during their first incarnation, never posting a winning mark.

The team departed the Arizona League in 2003, and was absent from the league for 11 seasons.

At the close of the 2013 season, the major-league White Sox announced their intention to sever their 19-year-long relationship with the Bristol White Sox of the Appalachian League, to be replaced with an AZL team operating from the team's spring training base at Camelback Ranch in Glendale, Arizona. The Pittsburgh Pirates replaced the White Sox in Bristol, Virginia, and in the Appalachian League as the new owners and operators of the Bristol Pirates.

The White Sox' Rookie-level team has competed in Arizona since 2014. The team shares the Camelback Ranch stadium with the Arizona League Dodgers, whose parent team, the Los Angeles Dodgers, also train at the Glendale facility. Prior to the 2021 season, the Arizona League was renamed as the Arizona Complex League (ACL).

== Roster ==
Arizona Complex League White Sox roster
Players		Coaches/Other
Pitchers: -- Kyle Casteel; -- Luke Craytor; 37 Reudis Diaz; -- Choyce Diffey; -- Justin Feld; 72 Justin Fuson; 36 Reinder Gomez; -- Darin Horn; -- Cameron Johnson; -- Nathan Leininger; 46 Cesar Nunez; 64 Diego Perez; -- Cal Scolari; -- Eric Segura; -- Michael Sharman; 52 Orlando Suarez; 48 Marcelo Valladares; -- Joey Volchko; -- Isaac Yeager	Catchers: -- Colin Barczi; 44 Jose M. Mendoza; Infielders: 1 Alejandro Cruz; 15 Eduardo Herrera; -- Jayson Jones; -- Luke Lawrence; -- Cole Prosek; 25 Jefrank Silva; 60 Yordani Soto; -- Landon Thome; Outfielders: 22 Marcelo Alcala; -- Matthew Bucciero; 7 Osniel Castillo; 61 Alan Escobar; 18 Frank Mieses; 6 Jordan Rich; -- Alex Weingartner	Manager: 26 Danny Gonzalez; Coaches: 21 Anders Dzurak (pitching); 73 Mike Gellinger (bench); 54 Miguel Gonzalez (performance); 13 Gerardo Olivares (hitting); 60-day injured list: 58 Angel Bello; -- Jackson Bergman (full season); 32 Jordany Chirinos; 28 Blake Larson; 29 Denny Lima (full season); -- Yobal Rodriguez (full season); -- Andrew Sentlinger; 57 Blake Shephardson (full season); 7-day injured list; * On Chicago White Sox 40-man roster; ~ Development list; # Rehab assignment; ∞ Reserve list; ‡ Restricted list; § Suspended list; † Temporarily inactive list; Roster updated September 6, 2026; Transactions; → More rosters: MiLB • Arizona Complex League; → Chicago White Sox minor league players

== Notable alumni (1998–2002) ==
- Edwin Almonte
- Lorenzo Barceló
- Rocky Biddle
- Joe Borchard
- Josh Fogg
- Matt Ginter
- Andy González
- Charlie Haeger
- Brandon McCarthy
- Gustavo Molina
- Michael Morse
- Arnie Muñoz
- Humberto Quintero
- David Sanders
- Joe Valentine
- Chris Young

Former Major League All-Star catcher Tony Peña began his career as a manager with the 1998 AZL White Sox. He later managed the MLB Kansas City Royals (2003–2005) and was a coach for the New York Yankees (2006–2017).
