= 2022 Chicago White Sox season =

2022 Chicago White Sox
- League: American League
- Division: Central
- Ballpark: Guaranteed Rate Field
- City: Chicago
- Record: 81–81 (.500)
- Divisional place: 2nd
- Owners: Jerry Reinsdorf
- General managers: Rick Hahn
- Managers: Tony La Russa (retired after being out for the rest of the season due to medical issues on August 31); Miguel Cairo (August 31–end of season)
- Television: NBC Sports Chicago; NBC Sports Chicago+ (Jason Benetti, Steve Stone, Len Kasper, Gordon Beckham, Adam Amin, Connor McKnight)
- Radio: ESPN Chicago; Chicago White Sox Radio Network (Len Kasper, Darrin Jackson, Connor McKnight); WRTO-AM (Spanish) (Hector Molina, Billy Russo)
- Stats: ESPN.com; Baseball Reference

The 2022 Chicago White Sox season was the club's 123rd season in Chicago, their 122nd in the American League and their 32nd at Guaranteed Rate Field.

On December 2, 2021, Commissioner of Baseball Rob Manfred announced a lockout of players, following expiration of the collective bargaining agreement (CBA) between the league and the Major League Baseball Players Association (MLBPA). On March 10, 2022, MLB and the MLBPA agreed to a new collective bargaining agreement, thus ending the lockout. Opening Day was played on April 7. Although MLB previously announced that several series would be cancelled due to the lockout, the agreement provided for a 162-game season, with originally canceled games to be made up via doubleheaders.

The White Sox failed to repeat as division champions and finished in second in the American League Central with a record of .500 at 81–81.

== Offseason ==
=== Lockout ===
The expiration of the league's collective bargaining agreement (CBA) with the Major League Baseball Players Association occurred on December 1, 2021, with no new agreement in place. As a result, the team owners voted unanimously to lockout the players stopping all free agency and trades.

The parties came to an agreement on a new CBA on March 10, 2022. The scheduled 162-game regular season was agreed to be played in its entirety, with no games cancelled. However, the delayed start to spring training meant that the regular season was postponed from its original March 31 Opening Day to April 7. For the White Sox, this meant that six games scheduled between March 31 and April 6 were moved to a later date: a three-game home series with the Minnesota Twins that was rescheduled for October 3 through October 5, and a three-game road series with the Kansas City Royals that was made up on three separate dates (May 17, August 10, and August 22nd).

=== Rule changes ===
Pursuant to the new CBA, several new rules were instituted for the 2022 season. The National League adopted the designated hitter full-time, a draft lottery was implemented, the postseason expanded from ten teams to twelve, and advertising patches was allowed to appear on player uniforms and helmets for the first time.

=== Transactions ===
- November 30, 2021: Pitcher Kendall Graveman signed a 3-year, $24M contract.
- December 1, 2021: Utility player Leury García signed a 3-year, $16.5M contract extension.
- January 26, 2022: Cuban outfielder Oscar Colas agreed to a contract with the White Sox that included a $2.7 million signing bonus.
- March 14, 2022: White Sox sign pitcher Joe Kelly to a 2-year, $17M contract as well as pitcher Vince Velasquez to a one-year, $3M contract.
- March 15, 2022: Second baseman Josh Harrison signed a one-year, $5.5M contract.
- April 1, 2022: White Sox trade pitcher Craig Kimbrel to the Los Angeles Dodgers for outfielder A. J. Pollock.
- April 3, 2022: White Sox trade catcher Zack Collins to the Toronto Blue Jays for catcher Reese McGuire
- April 5, 2022: White Sox sign pitcher Johnny Cueto to a 1-year, $4.2 million minor-league deal.

== Roster ==
2022 Chicago White Sox
Roster
Pitchers: 57 Tanner Banks; 39 Aaron Bummer; 61 Ryan Burr; 84 Dylan Cease; 59 Kyle Crick; 47 Johnny Cueto; 55 Jake Diekman; 63 Matt Foster; 27 Lucas Giolito; 49 Kendall Graveman; 31 Liam Hendriks; 17 Joe Kelly; 60 Dallas Keuchel; 34 Michael Kopech; 58 Jimmy Lambert; 40 Reynaldo López; 33 Lance Lynn; 65 Davis Martin; 66 José Ruiz; 62 Anderson Severino; 67 Bennett Sousa; 23 Vince Velasquez	Catchers: 24 Yasmani Grandal; 21 Reese McGuire; 21 Carlos Pérez; 44 Seby Zavala; Infielders: 79 José Abreu; 7 Tim Anderson; 1,21 Elvis Andrus; 30 Jake Burger; 28 Leury García; 12 Romy González; 5 Josh Harrison; 20 Danny Mendick; 10 Yoán Moncada; 50 Lenyn Sosa	Outfielders: 15 Adam Engel; 51 Adam Haseley; 74 Eloy Jiménez; 46 Mark Payton; 18 A. J. Pollock; 88 Luis Robert; 32 Gavin Sheets; 25 Andrew Vaughn	Manager: 41 Miguel Cairo; 22 Tony La Russa; Coaches: 8 Daryl Boston (first base); 41 Miguel Cairo (bench); 37 Howie Clark (assistant hitting); 36 Shelley Duncan (analytics coordinator); 98 Miguel González (bullpen catcher); 29 Curt Hasler (bullpen); 52 Ethan Katz (pitching); 47,99 Joe McEwing (third base/bench); 26 Frank Menechino (hitting); 38 Jerry Narron (major league instructor); 96 Luis Sierra (bullpen catcher)

== Regular season ==
=== American League Central ===
AL Central
Team	W	L	Pct.	GB	Home	Road
Cleveland Guardians	92	70	.568	—	46‍–‍35	46‍–‍35
Chicago White Sox	81	81	.500	11	37‍–‍44	44‍–‍37
Minnesota Twins	78	84	.481	14	46‍–‍35	32‍–‍49
Detroit Tigers	66	96	.407	26	36‍–‍46	30‍–‍50
Kansas City Royals	65	97	.401	27	39‍–‍42	26‍–‍55

=== American League Wild Card ===
Division leaders
Team	W	L	Pct.
Houston Astros	106	56	.654
New York Yankees	99	63	.611
Cleveland Guardians	92	70	.568

Wild Card teams (Top 3 teams qualify for postseason)
Team	W	L	Pct.	GB
Toronto Blue Jays	92	70	.568	+6
Seattle Mariners	90	72	.556	+4
Tampa Bay Rays	86	76	.531	—
Baltimore Orioles	83	79	.512	3
Chicago White Sox	81	81	.500	5
Minnesota Twins	78	84	.481	8
Boston Red Sox	78	84	.481	8
Los Angeles Angels	73	89	.451	13
Texas Rangers	68	94	.420	18
Detroit Tigers	66	96	.407	20
Kansas City Royals	65	97	.401	21
Oakland Athletics	60	102	.370	26

=== Records vs. opponents ===
2022 American League record Source: MLB Standings Grid – 2022
Team	BAL	BOS	CWS	CLE	DET	HOU	KC	LAA	MIN	NYY	OAK	SEA	TB	TEX	TOR	NL
Baltimore	—	9–10	5–2	3–3	1–5	4–3	4–3	6–1	3–4	7–12	3–4	2–4	9–10	6–0	9–10	12–8
Boston	10–9	—	2–4	5–2	5–1	4–2	3–4	4–3	3–4	6–13	5–1	6–1	7–12	6–1	3–16	9–11
Chicago	2–5	4–2	—	7–12	12–7	3–4	9–10	3–4	9–10	3–4	5–2	4–2	4–2	3–4	2–4	11–9
Cleveland	3–3	2–5	12–7	—	10–9	3–4	12–7	3–4	13–6	1–5	6–1	1–6	4–2	5–1	5–2	12–8
Detroit	5–1	1–5	7–12	9–10	—	0–7	10–9	3–3	8–11	1–5	2–5	1–6	2–5	4–3	2–5	11–9
Houston	3–4	2–4	4–3	4–3	7–0	—	5–2	13–6	6–0	5–2	12–7	12–7	5–1	14–5	2–4	12–8
Kansas City	3–4	4–3	10–9	7–12	9–10	2–5	—	3–3	7–12	1–6	3–3	2–4	3–4	2–4	2–5	7–13
Los Angeles	1–6	3–4	4–3	4–3	3–3	6–13	3–3	—	4–2	2–4	12–7	10–9	2–5	9–10	3–4	7–13
Minnesota	4–3	4–3	10–9	6–13	11–8	0–6	12–7	2–4	—	2–5	5–1	4–3	4–2	2–5	4–3	8–12
New York	12–7	13–6	4–3	5–1	5–1	2–5	6–1	4–2	5–2	—	5–2	2–4	11–8	4–3	11–8	10–10
Oakland	4–3	1–5	2–5	1–6	5–2	7–12	3–3	7–12	1–5	2–5	—	8–11	3–4	8–11	3–3	5–15
Seattle	4–2	1–6	2–4	6–1	6–1	7–12	4–2	9–10	3–4	4–2	11–8	—	2–5	14–5	5–2	12–8
Tampa Bay	10–9	12–7	2–4	2–4	5–2	1–5	4–3	5–2	2–4	8–11	4–3	5–2	—	4–3	10–9	12–8
Texas	0–6	1–6	4–3	1–5	3–4	5–14	4–2	10–9	5–2	3–4	11–8	5–14	3–4	—	2–4	11–9
Toronto	10–9	16–3	4–2	2–5	5–2	4–2	5–2	4–3	3–4	8–11	3–3	2–5	9–10	4–2	—	13–7

Updated with the results of all games through October 5, 2022.

=== Detailed records ===
American League
Opponent	Total	Home	Away	RS	RA
American League Central
Chicago White Sox	–	–	–	–	–
Cleveland Guardians	7–12	3–6	4–6	72	96
Detroit Tigers	12–7	5–5	7–2	100	59
Kansas City Royals	9–10	5–4	4–6	74	71
Minnesota Twins	9–10	5–4	4–6	91	87
Total	37–39	18–19	19–20	337	313
American League East
Opponent	Total	Home	Away	RS	RA
Baltimore Orioles	2–5	1–3	1–2	18	29
Boston Red Sox	4–2	1–2	3–0	23	38
New York Yankees	3–4	1–3	2–1	28	40
Tampa Bay Rays	4–2	2–1	2–1	21	26
Toronto Blue Jays	2–4	2–1	0–3	31	43
Total	15–17	7–10	8–7	122	176
American League West
Opponent	Total	Home	Away	RS	RA
Houston Astros	3–4	2–2	1–2	28	46
Los Angeles Angels	3–4	2–2	1–2	28	23
Oakland Athletics	5–2	2–1	3–1	42	27
Seattle Mariners	4–2	2–1	2–1	22	22
Texas Rangers	3–4	1–2	2–2	31	43
Total	16–15	9–8	7–7	133	146

National League
Opponent	Total	Home	Away	RS	RA
Arizona Diamondbacks	0–3	0–3	–	9	20
Chicago Cubs	3–1	1–1	2–0	13	13
Colorado Rockies	2–2	1–1	1–1	11	12
Los Angeles Dodgers	1–2	1–2	–	14	15
San Diego Padres	2–1	–	2–1	7	7
San Francisco Giants	3–0	–	3–0	19	7
Total	11–9	3–7	8–2	73	74

=== Notable transactions ===
- May 28, 2022: White Sox designated pitcher Dallas Keuchel for assignment.
- June 12, 2022: As part of a series of roster moves that included the selecting of catcher Seby Zavala's contract, White Sox designated infielder Yermín Mercedes for assignment.
- August 1, 2022: White Sox trade catcher Reese McGuire to the Boston Red Sox for pitcher Jake Diekman.
- August 18, 2022: White Sox sign shortstop Elvis Andrus.

=== Achievements ===
- On April 13, Dallas Keuchel earned his 100th career win in the major leagues as a result of the White Sox's 6–4 victory over the Seattle Mariners. Keuchel pitched five innings in the ball game, giving up six hits and three earned runs while striking out five batters.
- On June 27, Tim Anderson recorded his 100th career stolen base during the team's 4–3 loss to the Los Angeles Angels.
- Josh Harrison recorded his 1000th career hit during the team's 8–2 loss to the Minnesota Twins on July 5. During the game, he also became the first major league ballplayer in history to pitch on the same day he had his 1000th career hit, throwing a scoreless ninth inning in relief.
- The White Sox had two players selected to the 2022 MLB All-Star Game in Dodger Stadium: shortstop Tim Anderson, who started for the American League and went 1-for-2 with a single in the fourth inning, and closer Liam Hendriks, who pitched a third-of-an-inning of relief in the eighth inning. Both players also participated in the prior season's All-Star Game, making them the first White Sox teammates to play together in two consecutive "Midsummer Classics" since Mark Buehrle and Paul Konerko did it in 2005 and 2006.
- On August 6, Liam Hendriks became the first Australian-born reliever to throw 100 career saves, tossing a scoreless ninth inning against the Texas Rangers to secure the team's 2–1 victory in that night's ballgame.
- Beginning with his May 29 start against the Chicago Cubs, Dylan Cease went on a historic stretch in which he had 14 consecutive starts giving up 1 or fewer earned runs. That was the first time ever a starting pitcher went on such a streak since the earned run became a statistic in 1913, breaking the previous mark of 13 consecutive starts set by Jacob deGrom in 2021. Cease's streak was finally broken on August 16 against the Houston Astros, in which he gave up 3 earned runs on six hits in five innings of work.
- Yoán Moncada became the first player in American League history to have 5 or more hits and 5 or more RBIs in a game twice in the same season. The first game occurred June 15 at the Detroit Tigers (5-for-6 with 1 home run and 5 RBIs), while the second game occurred September 8 at the Oakland Athletics (5-for-6 with 2 home runs and 5 RBIs).

=== Tony La Russa medical leave ===
Just before the White Sox were set to face off against the Kansas City Royals on August 30, it was announced by the team that manager Tony La Russa had to miss the game under the direction of his doctors, in order to get further medical testing. The team's bench coach, Miguel Cairo, took over for La Russa as acting manager. It was later revealed that La Russa had a pacemaker installed and had to undergo a procedure to avoid any further health complications. Though there was some speculation as to La Russa returning to the dugout by late September, the White Sox officially put any rumors to rest on September 24 when they announced that he would miss the remainder of the 2022 season. La Russa's doctors never gave him permission to return to managing, though he was given permission to travel with the White Sox to Oakland on September 11 for the Athletics' jersey retirement ceremony of former pitcher Dave Stewart, who La Russa managed for several seasons.

Prior to La Russa's departure from the White Sox, the team's record was an underachieving 63-65 and they were five games behind the Cleveland Guardians for first place in the American League Central. At the start of Cairo's role as acting manager, the White Sox went on an initial hot streak, winning 10 of 13 games and climbing to as close as 1.5 games back of Cleveland on September 8. However, the late-season resurgence did not last long. Beginning on September 11, the White Sox would lose 11 of 15 games, including getting swept by the Guardians in a pivotal three-game home series from September 20–22. The Guardians would officially clinch the American League Central on September 25, ending the White Sox's dreams of repeating as division champions. The White Sox were officially eliminated from the playoffs on September 28 after a loss against the Twins which was their 8th straight loss.

== Game log ==
2022 regular season game log: 81–81 (Home: 37–44; Away: 44–37)
April: 8–12 (Home: 6–5; Away: 2–7)

#	Date	Opponent	Time (CT)	Score	Win	Loss	Save	Attendance	Record	Streak
1	April 8	@ Tigers	12:10 pm	4–5	Soto (1–0)	**Hendriks** (0–1)	—	43,480	0–1	L1
2	April 9	@ Tigers	12:10 pm	5–2	**Cease** (1–0)	Mize (0–1)	**Bummer** (1)	17,469	1–1	W1
3	April 10	@ Tigers	12:10 pm	10–1	**Crick** (1–0)	Skubal (0–1)	—	15,712	2–1	W2
4	April 12	Mariners	3:10 pm	3–2	**López** (1–0)	Brash (0–1)	**Hendriks** (1)	36,948	3–1	W3
5	April 13	Mariners	6:10 pm	6–4	**Keuchel** (1–0)	Ray (1–1)	**Hendriks** (2)	12,291	4–1	W4
6	April 14	Mariners	1:10 pm	1–5	Gilbert (1–0)	**Lambert** (0–1)	—	13,391	4–2	L1
7	April 15	Rays	6:10 pm	3–2	**Cease** (2–0)	Rasmussen (0–1)	**Hendriks** (3)	19,009	5–2	W1
8	April 16	Rays	1:10 pm	3–2	**López** (2–0)	Thompson (1–1)	**Hendriks** (4)	27,113	6–2	W2
9	April 17	Rays	1:10 pm	3–9	Mazza (1–0)	**Velasquez** (0–1)	—	17,798	6–3	L1
—	April 18	@ Guardians	5:10 pm	Postponed (Inclement weather, Makeup July 12)						
—	April 19	@ Guardians	5:10 pm	Postponed (Inclement weather, Makeup April 20)						
10	April 20 (1)	@ Guardians	2:10 pm	1–11	Bieber (1–0)	**Keuchel** (1–1)	—	see 2nd game	6–4	L2
11	April 20 (2)	@ Guardians	4:40 pm	1–2	Gose (1–0)	**Lambert** (0–2)	Clase (1)	9,196	6–5	L3
12	April 21	@ Guardians	12:10 pm	3–6	Plesac (1–1)	**Cease** (2–1)	Clase (2)	8,345	6–6	L4
13	April 22	@ Twins	7:10 pm	1–2	Duffey (1–2)	**Graveman** (0–1)	Pagán (2)	14,257	6–7	L5
14	April 23	@ Twins	3:05 pm	2–9	Bundy (3–0)	**Velasquez** (0–2)	—	16,686	6–8	L6
15	April 24	@ Twins	1:10 pm	4–6 (10)	Smith (1–0)	**Hendriks** (0–2)	—	16,197	6–9	L7
16	April 26	Royals	6:10 pm	0–6	Lynch (2–1)	**Keuchel** (1–2)	—	12,031	6–10	L8
17	April 27	Royals	1:10 pm	7–3	**Sousa** (1–0)	Snider (2–1)	**Graveman** (1)	12,363	7–10	W1
18	April 28	Royals	1:10 pm	2–5 (10)	Barlow (2–0)	**Bummer** (0–1)	Clarke (1)	11,242	7–11	L1
19	April 29	Angels	6:10 pm	1–5	Warren (2–0)	**Giolito** (0–1)	Iglesias (6)	23,709	7–12	L2
20	April 30	Angels	3:05 pm	4–0	**Velasquez** (1–2)	Suárez (0–2)	—	33,762	8–12	W1

May: 15–12 (Home: 5–8; Away: 10–4)

#	Date	Opponent	Time (CT)	Score	Win	Loss	Save	Attendance	Record	Streak
21	May 1	Angels	1:10 pm	5–6	Lorenzen (3–1)	**Keuchel** (1–3)	Tepera (1)	27,664	8–13	L1
22	May 2	Angels	1:10 pm	3–0	**Cease** (3–1)	Sandoval (1–1)	**Hendriks** (5)	13,112	9–13	W1
23	May 3	@ Cubs	6:40 pm	3–1	**López** (3–0)	Effross (0–1)	**Hendriks** (6)	34,206	10–13	W2
24	May 4	@ Cubs	6:40 pm	4–3	**Giolito** (1–1)	Hendricks (1–3)	**Hendriks** (7)	36,755	11–13	W3
25	May 6	@ Red Sox	6:10 pm	4–2	**Velasquez** (2–2)	Eovaldi (1–1)	**Hendriks** (8)	30,944	12–13	W4
26	May 7	@ Red Sox	3:10 pm	3–1 (10)	**López** (4–0)	Barnes (0–3)	**Hendriks** (9)	33,026	13–13	W5
27	May 8	@ Red Sox	10:35 am	3–2	**Keuchel** (2–3)	Houck (2–3)	**Sousa** (1)	28,602	14–13	W6
28	May 9	Guardians	7:10 pm	9–12 (11)	Clase (1–2)	**Burr** (0–1)	Stephan (1)	17,168	14–14	L1
29	May 10	Guardians	7:10 pm	4–1	**Giolito** (2–1)	Quantrill (1–2)	**Graveman** (2)	16,025	15–14	W1
—	May 11	Guardians	1:10 pm	Postponed (COVID–19 positive tests, Makeup July 23)						
30	May 12	Yankees	7:10 pm	7–15	Loáisiga (1–1)	**Kelly** (0–1)	—	20,050	15–15	L1
31	May 13	Yankees	7:10 pm	4–10	Cole (3–0)	**Velasquez** (2–3)	—	28,877	15–16	L2
32	May 14	Yankees	6:10 pm	3–2	**Hendriks** (1–2)	Chapman (0–1)	—	32,830	16–16	W1
33	May 15	Yankees	1:10 pm	1–5	Cortés Jr. (2–1)	**Kopech** (0–1)	—	29,500	16–17	L1
34	May 16	@ Royals	7:10 pm	5–3 (10)	**Burr** (1–1)	Barlow (2–1)	**Hendriks** (10)	12,441	17–17	W1
35	May 17 (1)	@ Royals	1:10 pm	3–0	**Cease** (4–1)	Heasley (0–2)	**Hendriks** (11)	9,168	18–17	W2
36	May 17 (2)	@ Royals	6:10 pm	1–2	Singer (1–0)	**Martin** (0–1)	Staumont (3)	11,684	18–18	L1
37	May 18	@ Royals	7:10 pm	2–6	Snider (3–1)	**López** (4–1)	—	13,504	18–19	L2
38	May 19	@ Royals	1:10 pm	7–4	**Sousa** (2–0)	Speier (0–1)	**Hendriks** (12)	11,784	19–19	W1
—	May 20	@ Yankees	6:05 pm	Postponed (Inclement weather, Makeup May 22)						
39	May 21	@ Yankees	12:05 pm	5–7	Cortés Jr. (3–1)	**Keuchel** (2–4)	Holmes (4)	44,001	19–20	L1
40	May 22 (1)	@ Yankees	2:05 pm	3–1	**Graveman** (1–1)	Chapman (0–2)	**Hendriks** (13)	see 2nd game	20–20	W1
41	May 22 (2)	@ Yankees	6:08 pm	5–0	**Kopech** (1–1)	Loáisiga (1–2)	—	36,167	21–20	W2
42	May 24	Red Sox	7:10 pm	3–16	Pivetta (3–4)	**Cease** (4–2)	—	21,835	21–21	L1
43	May 25	Red Sox	7:10 pm	3–1	**Giolito** (3–1)	Hill (1–2)	**Hendriks** (14)	21,075	22–21	W1
44	May 26	Red Sox	7:10 pm	7–16	Schreiber (2–0)	**Keuchel** (2–5)	—	24,896	22–22	L1
45	May 28	Cubs	6:15 pm	1–5	Thompson (5–0)	**Cueto** (0–1)	—	37,820	22–23	L2
46	May 29	Cubs	1:10 pm	5–4 (12)	**Foster** (1–0)	Gsellman (0–2)	—	38,080	23–23	W1
47	May 31	@ Blue Jays	6:07 pm	5–6	Gausman (5–3)	**Giolito** (3–2)	Romano (16)	25,424	23–24	L1

June: 12–15 (Home: 5–8; Away: 7–7)

#	Date	Opponent	Time (CT)	Score	Win	Loss	Save	Attendance	Record	Streak
48	June 1	@ Blue Jays	6:07 pm	3–7	Stripling (1–1)	**Kopech** (1–2)	—	23,312	23–25	L2
49	June 2	@ Blue Jays	2:07 pm	3–8	Manoah (6–1)	**Cueto** (0–2)	—	25,250	23–26	L3
50	June 3	@ Rays	6:10 pm	3–6	McClanahan (6–2)	**Martin** (0–2)	Poche (3)	8,930	23–27	L4
51	June 4	@ Rays	3:10 pm	3–2	**Crick** (2–0)	Beeks (1–1)	**Hendriks** (15)	19,452	24–27	W1
52	June 5	@ Rays	12:40 pm	6–5	**Giolito** (4–2)	Yarbrough (0–3)	**Hendriks** (16)	11,162	25–27	W2
53	June 7	Dodgers	7:10 pm	4–0	**Kopech** (2–2)	Bickford (0–1)	—	25,625	26–27	W3
54	June 8	Dodgers	7:10 pm	1–4	Gonsolin (7–0)	**Cueto** (0–3)	Hudson (5)	25,078	26–28	L1
55	June 9	Dodgers	1:10 pm	9–11	Graterol (2–2)	**Cease** (4–3)	—	25,482	26–29	L2
56	June 10	Rangers	7:10 pm	8–3	**Graveman** (2–1)	King (1–2)	—	24,270	27–29	W1
57	June 11	Rangers	1:10 pm	9–11 (10)	Moore (3–0)	**Foster** (1–1)	—	30,221	27–30	L1
58	June 12	Rangers	1:10 pm	6–8 (12)	Barlow (2–1)	**Foster** (1–2)	Allard (1)	31,096	27–31	L2
59	June 13	@ Tigers	6:10 pm	9–5	**Sousa** (3–0)	García (0–2)	—	16,634	28–31	W1
60	June 14	@ Tigers	6:10 pm	5–1	**Cease** (5–3)	Hutchison (0–4)	—	16,450	29–31	W2
61	June 15	@ Tigers	12:10 pm	13–0	**Martin** (1–2)	Faedo (1–3)	—	20,726	30–31	W3
62	June 17	@ Astros	7:10 pm	3–13	Valdez (7–3)	**Giolito** (4–3)	—	35,467	30–32	L1
63	June 18	@ Astros	3:10 pm	7–0	**Cueto** (1–3)	Verlander (8–3)	—	36,747	31–32	W1
64	June 19	@ Astros	6:08 pm	3–4	Javier (4–3)	**Kopech** (2–3)	Pressly (13)	37,709	31–33	L1
65	June 20	Blue Jays	7:10 pm	8–7	**Lynn** (1–0)	Berríos (5–3)	**Kelly** (1)	22,842	32–33	W1
66	June 21	Blue Jays	7:10 pm	7–6 (12)	**Velasquez** (3–3)	Gage (0–1)	—	20,529	33–33	W2
67	June 22	Blue Jays	1:10 pm	5–9	Stripling (4–2)	**Giolito** (4–4)	—	19,406	33–34	L1
68	June 23	Orioles	7:10 pm	0–4	Kremer (2–1)	**Cueto** (1–4)	López (12)	22,431	33–35	L2
69	June 24	Orioles	7:10 pm	1–4	Krehbiel (3–3)	**Kopech** (2–4)	López (13)	27,943	33–36	L3
70	June 25	Orioles	1:10 pm	2–6	Watkins (1–1)	**Lynn** (1–1)	—	29,282	33–37	L4
71	June 26	Orioles	1:10 pm	4–3	**Cease** (6–3)	Lyles (4–7)	**Graveman** (3)	29,191	34–37	W1
72	June 27	@ Angels	8:38 pm	3–4	Syndergaard (5–6)	**López** (4–2)	Iglesias (14)	21,973	34–38	L1
73	June 28	@ Angels	8:38 pm	11–4	**Cueto** (2–4)	Ortega (1–3)	—	23,979	35–38	W1
74	June 29	@ Angels	8:38 pm	1–4	Ohtani (7–4)	**Kopech** (2–5)	Iglesias (15)	27,612	35–39	L1

July: 16–11 (Home: 7–7; Away: 9–4)

#	Date	Opponent	Time (CT)	Score	Win	Loss	Save	Attendance	Record	Streak
75	July 1	@ Giants	9:15 pm	1–0	**Banks** (1–0)	Doval (2–4)	**Graveman** (4)	35,266	36–39	W1
76	July 2	@ Giants	3:05 pm	5–3	**Cease** (7–3)	Webb (7–3)	**Graveman** (5)	30,804	37–39	W2
77	July 3	@ Giants	3:05 pm	13–4	**Giolito** (5–4)	Hjelle (0–1)	—	30,155	38–39	W3
78	July 4	Twins	7:10 pm	3–6 (10)	Pagán (3–3)	**Kelly** (0–2)	—	32,483	38–40	L1
79	July 5	Twins	7:10 pm	2–8	Winder (4–2)	**Kopech** (2–6)	—	18,566	38–41	L2
80	July 6	Twins	1:10 pm	9–8 (10)	**Ruiz** (1–0)	Morán (0–1)	—	18,393	39–41	W1
81	July 7	Tigers	7:10 pm	1–2	Brieske (2–6)	**Cease** (7–4)	Soto (17)	21,876	39–42	L1
82	July 8	Tigers	7:10 pm	5–7	Skubal (6–7)	**Giolito** (5–5)	Fulmer (2)	29,215	39–43	L2
83	July 9	Tigers	1:10 pm	8–0	**Cueto** (3–4)	Hill (1–1)	—	29,215	40–43	W1
84	July 10	Tigers	1:10 pm	4–2	**Graveman** (3–1)	Fulmer (2–3)	**Hendriks** (17)	31,072	41–43	W2
85	July 11	@ Guardians	6:10 pm	4–8	Quantrill (5–5)	**Lynn** (1–2)	—	13,655	41–44	L1
86	July 12 (1)	@ Guardians	1:10 pm	1–4	Bieber (4–5)	**Martin** (1–3)	—	11,342	41–45	L2
87	July 12 (2)	@ Guardians	6:10 pm	7–0	**Cease** (8–4)	Pilkington (1–2)	—	11,750	42–45	W1
88	July 13	@ Guardians	6:10 pm	2–1	**Giolito** (6–5)	Hentges (2–2)	**Hendriks** (18)	13,987	43–45	W2
89	July 14	@ Twins	6:40 pm	12–2	**Cueto** (4–4)	Gray (4–3)	—	26,907	44–45	W3
90	July 15	@ Twins	7:10 pm	6–2	**Kopech** (3–6)	Pagán (3–4)	—	27,021	45–45	W4
91	July 16	@ Twins	1:10 pm	3–6	Bundy (6–4)	**Lynn** (1–3)	Durán (6)	28,514	45–46	L1
92	July 17	@ Twins	1:10 pm	11–0	**Cease** (9–4)	Archer (2–4)	—	23,225	46–46	W1
—	July 19	**92nd All-Star Game in Los Angeles, CA**								
93	July 22	Guardians	7:10 pm	2–8	Quantrill (7–5)	**Giolito** (6–6)	—	31,379	46–47	L1
94	July 23 (1)	Guardians	12:10 pm	4–7	Stephan (4–3)	**Hendriks** (1–3)	Clase (20)	18,518	46–48	L2
95	July 23 (2)	Guardians	6:15 pm	5–4	**Kelly** (1–2)	Shaw (4–2)	**Foster** (1)	26,329	47–48	W1
96	July 24	Guardians	1:10 pm	6–3	**Cease** (10–4)	Bieber (4–6)	—	30,831	48–48	W2
97	July 26	@ Rockies	7:40 pm	2–1	**Kopech** (4–6)	Márquez (6–8)	**Hendriks** (19)	40,233	49–48	W3
98	July 27	@ Rockies	2:10 pm	5–6	Stephenson (2–1)	**Graveman** (3–2)	—	30,731	49–49	L1
99	July 29	Athletics	7:10 pm	3–7	Kaprielian (2–5)	**Lynn** (1–4)	—	28,503	49–50	L2
100	July 30	Athletics	6:15 pm	3–2	**Hendriks** (2–3)	Jackson (2–3)	—	28,142	50–50	W1
101	July 31	Athletics	1:10 pm	4–1	**Cease** (11–4)	Oller (1–4)	**Hendriks** (20)	30,028	51–50	W2

August: 13–16 (Home: 8–7; Away: 5–9)

#	Date	Opponent	Time (CT)	Score	Win	Loss	Save	Attendance	Record	Streak
102	August 1	Royals	7:10 pm	1–2	Lynch (4–7)	**Kopech** (4–7)	Barlow (17)	17,500	51–51	L1
103	August 2	Royals	7:10 pm	9–2	**Giolito** (7–6)	Keller (5–12)	—	24,361	52–51	W1
104	August 3	Royals	1:10 pm	4–1	**Lynn** (2–4)	Singer (4–4)	**Hendriks** (21)	19,753	53–51	W2
105	August 4	@ Rangers	7:05 pm	2–3	Burke (6–2)	**Cueto** (4–5)	Hernández (2)	20,972	53–52	L1
106	August 5	@ Rangers	7:05 pm	2–1	**Cease** (12–4)	Otto (4–8)	**Hendriks** (22)	25,470	54–52	W1
107	August 6	@ Rangers	6:05 pm	0–8	Dunning (2–6)	**Kopech** (4–8)	—	38,275	54–53	L1
108	August 7	@ Rangers	1:35 pm	8–2	**Giolito** (8–6)	Howard (2–4)	—	29,579	55–53	W1
109	August 9 (1)	@ Royals	4:10 pm	2–4	Singer (5–4)	**Lynn** (2–5)	Cuas (1)	see 2nd game	55–54	L1
110	August 9 (2)	@ Royals	6:30 pm	3–2	**Martin** (2–3)	Heasley (1–7)	**Hendriks** (23)	12,700	56–54	W1
111	August 10	@ Royals	7:10 pm	3–8	Staumont (3–1)	**Diekman** (5–2)	—	15,463	56–55	L1
112	August 11	@ Royals	1:10 pm	3–5	Greinke (4–7)	**Cease** (12–5)	Barlow (18)	10,009	56–56	L2
113	August 12	Tigers	6:10 pm	2–0	**López** (5–2)	Lange (4–3)	**Hendriks** (24)	33,015	57–56	W1
114	August 13	Tigers	6:10 pm	6–4	**Giolito** (9–6)	Jiménez (3–2)	**Hendriks** (25)	29,458	58–56	W2
115	August 14	Tigers	1:10 pm	5–3	**Lynn** (3–5)	Alexander (2–7)	**Graveman** (6)	32,154	59–56	W3
116	August 15	Astros	7:10 pm	4–2	**Cueto** (5–5)	Montero (4–2)	**Hendriks** (26)	18,205	60–56	W4
117	August 16	Astros	7:10 pm	4–3	**Lambert** (1–2)	Neris (4–4)	**Hendriks** (27)	23,476	61–56	W5
118	August 17	Astros	7:10 pm	2–3	Valdez (12–4)	**Kopech** (4–9)	Pressly (24)	24,671	61–57	L1
119	August 18	Astros	1:10 pm	5–21	García (10–8)	**Giolito** (9–7)	—	24,407	61–58	L2
120	August 19	@ Guardians	6:10 pm	2–5	McKenzie (9–9)	**López** (5–3)	Clase (28)	25,521	61–59	L3
121	August 20	@ Guardians	6:10 pm	2–0	**Cueto** (6–5)	Bieber (8–7)	**Hendriks** (28)	26,179	62–59	W1
—	August 21	@ Guardians	12:40 pm	Postponed (Inclement weather, Makeup September 15)						
122	August 22	@ Royals	7:10 pm	4–6	Garrett (3–1)	**Kelly** (1–3)	Barlow (20)	8,471	62–60	L1
123	August 23	@ Orioles	6:05 pm	3–5	Voth (4–1)	**Cease** (12–6)	Bautista (9)	12,954	62–61	L2
124	August 24	@ Orioles	6:05 pm	5–3	**Giolito** (10–7)	Watkins (4–4)	—	12,565	63–61	W1
125	August 25	@ Orioles	6:05 pm	3–4 (11)	Bautista (4–3)	**Diekman** (5–3)	—	13,905	63–62	L1
126	August 26	Diamondbacks	7:10 pm	2–7	Henry (3–2)	**Cueto** (6–6)	—	33,054	63–63	L2
127	August 27	Diamondbacks	6:10 pm	5–10	Kelly (11–5)	**Martin** (2–4)	—	25,837	63–64	L3
128	August 28	Diamondbacks	1:10 pm	2–3	Ramirez (5–4)	**Graveman** (3–3)	Kennedy (9)	29,781	63–65	L4
129	August 30	Royals	7:10 pm	7–9	Cuas (3–2)	**Giolito** (10–8)	—	17,130	63–66	L5
130	August 31	Royals	7:10 pm	4–2	**Lynn** (4–5)	Bubic (2–10)	**Hendriks** (29)	17,168	64–66	W1

September: 14–13 (Home: 4–8; Away: 10–5)

#	Date	Opponent	Time (CT)	Score	Win	Loss	Save	Attendance	Record	Streak
131	September 1	Royals	1:10 pm	7–1	**Cueto** (7–6)	Mengden (0–1)	—	15,257	65–66	W2
132	September 2	Twins	7:10 pm	4–3	**Hendriks** (3–3)	López (4–7)	—	24,818	66–66	W3
133	September 3	Twins	6:10 pm	13–0	**Cease** (13–6)	Mahle (6–8)	—	31,655	67–66	W4
134	September 4	Twins	1:10 pm	1–5	Bundy (8–6)	**Giolito** (10–9)	—	32,305	67–67	L1
135	September 5	@ Mariners	5:40 pm	3–2	**Lynn** (5–5)	Gonzales (10–13)	**Hendriks** (30)	37,109	68–67	W1
136	September 6	@ Mariners	8:40 pm	0–3	Gilbert (12–5)	**Cueto** (7–7)	Sewald (18)	17,958	68–68	L1
137	September 7	@ Mariners	3:10 pm	9–6	**Bummer** (1–1)	Castillo (7–3)	**Hendriks** (31)	15,264	69–68	W1
138	September 8	@ Athletics	8:40 pm	14–2	**Cease** (14–6)	Sears (5–2)	—	4,591	70–68	W2
139	September 9	@ Athletics	8:40 pm	5–3	**Bummer** (2–1)	Puk (3–2)	**Hendriks** (32)	11,494	71–68	W3
140	September 10	@ Athletics	3:07 pm	10–2	**Lynn** (6–5)	Martínez (4–4)	—	11,107	72–68	W4
141	September 11	@ Athletics	3:07 pm	3–10	Irvin (8–11)	**Cueto** (7–8)	—	11,701	72–69	L1
142	September 13	Rockies	7:10 pm	4–2	**Kopech** (5–9)	Kuhl (6–9)	**Hendriks** (33)	23,606	73–69	W1
143	September 14	Rockies	1:10 pm	0–3	Freeland (9–9)	**Cease** (14–7)	Bard (30)	16,654	73–70	L1
144	September 15	@ Guardians	12:10 pm	8–2	**Lynn** (7–5)	Gaddis (0–2)	—	11,186	74–70	W1
145	September 16	@ Tigers	6:10 pm	2–3 (10)	Lange (5–4)	**Hendriks** (3–4)	—	16,335	74–71	L1
146	September 17	@ Tigers	5:10 pm	4–3 (11)	**Hendriks** (4–4)	Soto (2–9)	**Bummer** (2)	17,579	75–71	W1
147	September 18	@ Tigers	12:10 pm	11–5	**Banks** (2–0)	Hutchison (2–9)	—	14,435	76–71	W2
148	September 20	Guardians	7:10 pm	7–10 (11)	Clase (3–4)	**Diekman** (5–4)	—	23,242	76–72	L1
149	September 21	Guardians	7:10 pm	2–8	McKenzie (11–11)	**Lynn** (7–6)	—	22,606	76–73	L2
150	September 22	Guardians	7:10 pm	2–4	Bieber (12–8)	**Cueto** (7–9)	Clase (37)	23,395	76–74	L3
151	September 23	Tigers	7:10 pm	3–5	Rodríguez (4–5)	**López** (5–4)	Soto (27)	33.257	76–75	L4
152	September 24	Tigers	6:10 pm	2–7	Hutchison (3–9)	**Martin** (2–5)	—	36,177	76–76	L5
153	September 25	Tigers	1:10 pm	1–4	Chafin (2–3)	**Graveman** (3–4)	Soto (28)	33,549	76–77	L6
154	September 27	@ Twins	6:40 pm	0–4	Ober (2–3)	**Lynn** (7–7)	—	23,647	76–78	L7
155	September 28	@ Twins	6:40 pm	4–8	Thielbar (4–2)	**Cueto** (7–10)	—	22,332	76–79	L8
156	September 29	@ Twins	12:10 pm	4–3	**López** (6–4)	Thielbar (4–3)	**Hendriks** (34)	23,397	77–79	W1
157	September 30	@ Padres	8:40 pm	3–1	**Martin** (3–5)	Darvish (16–8)	**Hendriks** (35)	37,490	78–79	W2

October: 3–2 (Home: 2–1; Away: 1–1)

#	Date	Opponent	Time (CT)	Score	Win	Loss	Save	Attendance	Record	Streak
158	October 1	@ Padres	7:40 pm	2–5	Clevinger (7–7)	**Cease** (14–8)	Hader (35)	38,114	78–80	L1
159	October 2	@ Padres	3:10 pm	2–1	**Lynn** (8–7)	Snell (8–10)	**Hendriks** (36)	41,407	79–80	W1
160	October 3	Twins	7:10 pm	3–2	**Cueto** (8–10)	Jax (7–4)	**Hendriks** (37)	22,891	80–80	W2
161	October 4	Twins	7:10 pm	8–3	**Giolito** (11–9)	Winder (4–6)	—	24,884	81–80	W3
162	October 5	Twins	3:10 pm	1–10	Varland (1–2)	**Martin** (3–5)	Sands (1)	18,918	81–81	L1

Legend: = Win = Loss = Postponement
Bold = White Sox team member

== Statistics ==
=== Batting ===
(Final statistics)
(Team leaders in BOLD)
Note: G = Games played; AB = At bats; R = Runs; H = Hits; 2B = Doubles; 3B = Triples; HR = Home runs; RBI = Runs batted in; SB = Stolen bases; BB = Walks; K = Strikeouts; Avg. = Batting average; OBP = On Base Percentage; SLG = Slugging Percentage; TB = Total Bases

Player	G	AB	R	H	2B	3B	HR	RBI	SB	BB	K	AVG	OBP	SLG	TB
José Abreu	**157**	**601**	**85**	**183**	**40**	0	15	75	0	**62**	110	**.304**	**.378**	**.446**	**268**
Tim Anderson	79	332	50	100	13	0	6	25	**13**	14	55	.301	.339	.395	131
Elvis Andrus	43	181	25	49	8	0	9	28	11	9	30	.271	.309	.464	84
Jake Burger	51	168	20	42	9	1	8	26	0	10	56	.250	.302	.458	77
Adam Engel	119	245	32	55	13	1	2	17	12	11	76	.224	.269	.310	76
Leury García	97	300	38	63	8	0	3	20	2	7	65	.210	.233	.267	80
Romy González	32	105	15	25	4	1	2	11	0	2	39	.238	.257	.352	37
Yasmani Grandal	99	327	15	66	7	0	5	27	1	45	79	.202	.301	.269	88
Josh Harrison	119	386	50	99	19	**2**	7	27	2	21	71	.256	.317	.370	143
Adam Haseley	14	21	4	5	0	0	0	2	0	3	7	.238	.333	.238	5
Eloy Jiménez	84	292	40	86	12	0	16	54	0	28	72	.295	.358	.500	146
Reese McGuire	53	151	12	34	9	0	0	10	0	6	33	.225	.261	.285	43
Danny Mendick	31	97	22	28	4	1	3	15	1	7	23	.289	.343	.443	43
Yoán Moncada	104	397	41	84	18	1	12	51	2	32	**114**	.212	.273	.353	140
Mark Payton	8	21	3	3	0	0	0	1	0	4	4	.143	.280	.143	3
Carlos Pérez	7	18	0	4	2	0	0	2	0	0	2	.222	.222	.333	6
A. J. Pollock	138	489	61	120	26	1	14	56	3	32	98	.245	.292	.389	190
Luis Robert	98	380	54	108	18	0	12	56	11	17	77	.284	.319	.426	162
Gavin Sheets	124	377	34	91	19	0	15	53	0	27	86	.241	.295	.411	155
Lenyn Sosa	11	35	3	4	1	0	1	1	0	1	12	.114	.139	.229	8
Andrew Vaughn	134	510	60	138	28	1	**17**	**76**	0	31	96	.271	.321	.429	219
Seby Zavala	61	178	22	48	14	0	2	21	0	19	64	.270	.347	.382	68
**TEAM TOTALS**	162	5611	686	1435	272	9	149	654	58	388	1269	.256	.310	.387	2172

=== Pitching ===
Team leaders in BOLD

- Indicates league leader.

Note: W = Wins; L = Losses; ERA = Earned run average; WHIP = Walks plus hits per inning pitched; G = Games pitched; GS = Games started; SV = Saves; IP = Innings pitched; H = Hits allowed; R = Runs allowed; ER = Earned runs allowed; BB = Walks allowed; K = Strikeouts

Player	W	L	ERA	WHIP	G	GS	SV	IP	H	R	ER	BB	K
Tanner Banks	2	0	3.06	1.13	35	0	0	53.0	42	25	18	18	49
Aaron Bummer	2	1	2.36	1.50	32	0	2	26.2	30	11	7	10	30
Ryan Burr	1	1	6.00	1.33	8	0	0	9.0	8	7	6	4	7
Dylan Cease	**14**	8	**2.20**	**1.11**	32	**32**	0	**184.0**	126	55	45	**78***	**227**
Kyle Crick	2	0	4.02	1.34	14	0	0	15.2	10	7	7	11	19
Johnny Cueto	8	**10**	3.35	1.23	25	24	0	158.1	161	66	59	33	102
Jake Diekman	0	3	6.52	1.91	26	0	0	19.1	25	18	14	12	28
Matt Foster	1	2	4.40	1.33	48	0	1	45.0	43	25	22	17	42
Lucas Giolito	11	9	4.90	1.44	30	30	0	161.2	**171**	**92**	**88**	61	177
Kendall Graveman	3	4	3.18	1.40	**65**	0	6	65.0	65	29	23	26	66
Josh Harrison	0	0	18.00	3.67	3	0	0	3.0	9	6	6	2	2
Liam Hendriks	4	4	2.81	1.04	58	0	**37**	57.2	44	22	18	16	85
Joe Kelly	1	3	6.08	1.60	43	1	1	37.0	36	26	25	23	53
Dallas Keuchel	2	5	7.88	2.16	8	8	0	32.0	49	33	28	20	20
Michael Kopech	5	9	3.54	1.19	25	25	0	119.1	85	53	47	57	105
Jimmy Lambert	1	2	3.26	1.29	42	2	0	47.0	40	18	17	24	45
Reynaldo López	6	4	2.76	0.95	61	1	0	65.1	51	24	20	11	63
Lance Lynn	8	7	3.99	1.14	21	21	0	121.2	120	65	54	19	124
Davis Martin	3	6	4.83	1.30	14	9	0	63.1	63	36	34	19	48
José Ruiz	1	0	4.60	1.42	63	0	0	60.2	53	32	31	33	68
Anderson Severino	0	0	6.14	1.50	6	0	0	7.1	7	5	5	4	9
Bennett Sousa	3	0	8.41	1.72	25	0	1	20.1	25	20	19	10	12
Vince Velasquez	3	3	4.78	1.24	27	9	0	75.1	68	42	40	25	69
**TEAM TOTALS**	81	81	3.92	1.29	162	162	48	1447.2	1331	717	631	533	1450

== Farm system ==
Level	Team	League	Manager
AAA	Charlotte Knights	International League	Julio Mosquera (acting)
AA	Birmingham Barons	Southern League	Justin Jirschele
High-A	Winston-Salem Dash	South Atlantic League	Lorenzo Bundy
A	Kannapolis Cannon Ballers	Carolina League	Guillermo Quiróz
Rookie	ACL White Sox	Arizona Complex League	Pat Leyland
Rookie	DSL White Sox	Dominican Summer League	Angel Rosario

== Awards and honors ==
Dylan Cease was the recipient of the American League Pitcher of the Month Award for the month of June. Cease posted a 2–1 record in the month of June as a starter, with a 0.33 ERA in 27.1 innings pitched, 45 strikeouts, and an opponent batting average of .192. Cease became the first White Sox pitcher to earn the honor since Lucas Giolito back in May 2019. Cease would then go on to win Pitcher of the Month again in the month of July after recording a 5–1 record, striking out 40 batters in 35.2 innings pitched, and allowing only three earned runs. It was the first time ever a White Sox pitcher won the award in back-to-back months, and the first time any pitcher in Major League Baseball accomplished such a feat since Jack Flaherty in August and September 2019. At the end of the season, Cease was named as a Cy Young Award finalist after Cease posted a 14–8 record in 32 starts with an ERA of 2.20 in 184 innings while striking out a career high 227 batters.

Johnny Cueto earned American League Player of the Week honors for the period of August 15 to August 21. Cueto went 2–0 as a starter that week while posting a 0.54 ERA in 16 2/3 innings of work.

On June 30, Tim Anderson was announced as one of the two finalists for the starting American League shortstop position in Major League Baseball's 2022 All-Star Game fan voting. Anderson finished as one of the two top vote-getters in that position, alongside Bo Bichette of the Toronto Blue Jays. Anderson defeated Bichette in the final voting on July 8, becoming the first White Sox shortstop to earn a starting spot at the All-Star Game since Luis Aparicio in 1970.

At the end of the season, José Abreu was named a finalist for the American League Silver Slugger Award. Abreu posted a .304 batting average in 2022, which was better than all the other first basemen finalists from the American League. Dylan Cease finished second in the American League Cy Young Award voting, behind only Justin Verlander of the Houston Astros. It was the highest finish in the Cy Young voting by a White Sox pitcher since Esteban Loaiza finished second place in 2003.
