= 1994 in baseball =

The following are the baseball events of the year 1994 throughout the world.

== Headline events of the year ==
As a result of a players' strike, the MLB season ended prematurely on August 11, 1994. No postseason (including the World Series) was played. Minor League Baseball was not affected. During the shortened Major League Baseball season, the league adorned uniforms and stadiums to announce the 125th anniversary of baseball's first professional team, the Cincinnati Red Stockings. The Yomiuri Giants also celebrated their sixtieth anniversary with their eighteenth championship in the Japan Series.

Considered by some to be among history's greatest athletes, Michael Jordan suited up for the Birmingham Barons, the Class AA affiliate of the Chicago White Sox. He played in his first game on April 9, going 0-for-3.

== Champions ==
=== Nippon Professional Baseball ===
- Japan Series: Yomiuri Giants over Seibu Lions (4-2).
- Series Most Valuable Player: Hiromi Makihara
- Series Fighting Spirit Award: Kazuhiro Kiyohara

=== Minor League Baseball – AAA Leagues ===
- American Association: Indianapolis Indians
- International League: Richmond Braves
- Mexican League: Mexico City Red Devils
- Pacific Coast League: Albuquerque Dukes

=== Other champions ===
- Baseball World Cup: Cuba
- Caribbean World Series: Tigres del Licey (Dominican Republic)
- College World Series: Oklahoma
- Cuban National Series: Villa Clara over Industriales
- Japan Series: Yomiuri Giants over Seibu Lions (4-2)
- Korean Series: LG Twins over Pacific Dolphins
- Big League World Series: Taipei, Taiwan
- Junior League World Series: Thousand Oaks, California
- Little League World Series: Coquivacoa, Maracaibo, Venezuela
- Senior League World Series: Brandon, Florida
- Taiwan Series: Brother Elephants

== Awards and honors ==
- Baseball Hall of Fame
  - Steve Carlton
  - Leo Durocher
  - Phil Rizzuto
- Most Valuable Player
  - Frank Thomas (AL) Chicago White Sox
  - Jeff Bagwell (NL) Houston Astros
- Cy Young Award
  - David Cone (AL) Kansas City Royals
  - Greg Maddux (NL) Atlanta Braves
- Rookie of the Year
  - Bob Hamelin (AL) Kansas City Royals
  - Raúl Mondesí (NL) Los Angeles Dodgers
- Manager of the Year Award
  - Buck Showalter (AL) New York Yankees
  - Felipe Alou (NL) Montreal Expos
- Woman Executive of the Year (major or minor league): Naomi Silver, Rochester Red Wings, International League
- Gold Glove Award
  - Don Mattingly (1B) (AL)
  - Roberto Alomar (2B) (AL)
  - Wade Boggs (3B) (AL)
  - Omar Vizquel (SS) (AL)
  - Ken Griffey Jr. (OF) (AL)
  - Kenny Lofton (OF) (AL)
  - Devon White (OF) (AL)
  - Iván Rodríguez (C) (AL)
  - Mark Langston (P) (AL)
  - Jeff Bagwell (1B) (NL)
  - Craig Biggio (2B) (NL)
  - Matt Williams (3B) (NL)
  - Barry Larkin (SS) (NL)
  - Barry Bonds (OF) (NL)
  - Marquis Grissom (OF) (NL)
  - Darren Lewis (OF) (NL)
  - Tom Pagnozzi (C) (NL)
  - Greg Maddux (P) (NL)

== Statistical leaders ==
| | American League | | National League |
| Type | Name | Stat | Name | Stat |
| AVG | Paul O'Neill NYY | .359 | Tony Gwynn SD | .394 |
| HR | Ken Griffey Jr. SEA | 40 | Matt Williams SF | 43 |
| RBI | Kirby Puckett MIN | 112 | Jeff Bagwell HOU | 116 |
| Wins | Jimmy Key NYY | 17 | Ken Hill MON; Greg Maddux ATL | 16 |
| ERA | Steve Ontiveros OAK | 2.65 | Greg Maddux ATL | 1.56 |
| Ks | Randy Johnson SEA | 204 | Andy Benes SD | 189 |

== Major League Baseball final standings ==
American League
| Rank | Club | Wins | Losses | Win % | GB |
East Division
| 1st | New York Yankees | 70 | 43 | .619 | -- |
| 2nd | Baltimore Orioles | 63 | 49 | .562 | 6.5 |
| 3rd | Toronto Blue Jays | 55 | 60 | .478 | 16.0 |
| 4th | Boston Red Sox | 54 | 61 | .470 | 17.0 |
| 5th | Detroit Tigers | 53 | 62 | .461 | 18.0 |
Central Division
| 1st | Chicago White Sox | 67 | 46 | .593 | -- |
| 2nd | Cleveland Indians | 66 | 47 | .584 | 1.0 |
| 3rd | Kansas City Royals | 64 | 51 | .557 | 4.0 |
| 4th | Minnesota Twins | 53 | 60 | .469 | 14.0 |
| 5th | Milwaukee Brewers | 53 | 62 | .461 | 15.0 |
West Division
| 1st | Texas Rangers | 52 | 62 | .456 | -- |
| 2nd | Oakland Athletics | 51 | 63 | .447 | 1.0 |
| 3rd | Seattle Mariners | 49 | 63 | .438 | 2.0 |
| 4th | California Angels | 47 | 68 | .409 | 5.5 |

National League
| Rank | Club | Wins | Losses | Win % | GB |
East Division
| 1st | Montreal Expos | 74 | 40 | .649 | -- |
| 2nd | Atlanta Braves | 68 | 46 | .596 | 6.0 |
| 3rd | New York Mets | 55 | 58 | .487 | 18.5 |
| 4th | Philadelphia Phillies | 54 | 61 | .470 | 20.5 |
| 5th | Florida Marlins | 51 | 64 | .443 | 23.5 |
Central Division
| 1st | Cincinnati Reds | 66 | 48 | .579 | -- |
| 2nd | Houston Astros | 66 | 49 | .574 | 0.5 |
| 3rd | Pittsburgh Pirates | 53 | 61 | .465 | 13.0 |
| 3rd | St. Louis Cardinals | 53 | 61 | .465 | 13.0 |
| 5th | Chicago Cubs | 49 | 64 | .434 | 16.5 |
West Division
| 1st | Los Angeles Dodgers | 58 | 56 | .509 | -- |
| 2nd | San Francisco Giants | 55 | 60 | .478 | 3.5 |
| 3rd | Colorado Rockies | 53 | 64 | .453 | 6.5 |
| 4th | San Diego Padres | 47 | 70 | .402 | 12.5 |

- On September 14, the remainder of the major league season was cancelled by acting commissioner Bud Selig after 34 days of the players' strike.

== American League ==
| Team | Manager | Comments |
|---|---|---|
| Baltimore Orioles | Johnny Oates | |
| Boston Red Sox | Butch Hobson | |
| California Angels | Buck Rodgers | Replaced during the season by Marcel Lachemann |
| Chicago White Sox | Gene Lamont | |
| Cleveland Indians | Mike Hargrove | |
| Detroit Tigers | Sparky Anderson | |
| Kansas City Royals | Hal McRae | |
| Milwaukee Brewers | Phil Garner | |
| Minnesota Twins | Tom Kelly | |
| New York Yankees | Buck Showalter | Was awarded the 1995 All-Star Game managerial role as unofficial league champions. |
| Oakland Athletics | Tony La Russa | |
| Seattle Mariners | Lou Piniella | |
| Texas Rangers | Kevin Kennedy | |
| Toronto Blue Jays | Cito Gaston | |

== National League ==
| Team | Manager | Comments |
|---|---|---|
| Atlanta Braves | Bobby Cox | |
| Chicago Cubs | Tom Trebelhorn | |
| Cincinnati Reds | Davey Johnson | |
| Colorado Rockies | Don Baylor | |
| Florida Marlins | Rene Lachemann | |
| Houston Astros | Terry Collins | |
| Los Angeles Dodgers | Tommy Lasorda | |
| Montreal Expos | Felipe Alou | Was awarded the 1995 All-Star Game managerial role as unofficial league champions. |
| New York Mets | Dallas Green | |
| Philadelphia Phillies | Jim Fregosi | |
| Pittsburgh Pirates | Jim Leyland | |
| St. Louis Cardinals | Joe Torre | |
| San Diego Padres | Jim Riggleman | |
| San Francisco Giants | Dusty Baker | |

== Events ==
=== January ===
- January 12 – Steve Carlton is elected to the Baseball Hall of Fame by the Baseball Writers' Association of America, receiving almost 96% of the vote. Orlando Cepeda falls seven votes short of the 75% required for election.

=== February ===
- February 7 – Basketball superstar Michael Jordan signs a minor league contract with the Chicago White Sox. He is invited to spring training with the team as a non-roster invitee.
- February 15 – Ila Borders becomes the first woman to pitch in a college game. Appearing for Southern California College of Cosa Mesa, Borders throws a five-hit, 12–1 victory against Claremont-Mudd-Scripps.
- February 25 – The Veterans Committee elects Phil Rizzuto and Leo Durocher to the Baseball Hall of Fame.

=== April ===
- April 3 – The Cincinnati Reds host an opening night game on Easter Sunday against the St. Louis Cardinals. It is the first time in Major League history that a season opens with a night game instead of a day game. Only 32,803 attend the game, which is criticized by many Reds fans at the time as breaking tradition.
- April 4 – At Wrigley Field, Chicago Cubs outfielder Tuffy Rhodes blasts three home runs on Opening Day, victimizing New York Mets pitcher Dwight Gooden. Rhodes becomes the first player in Major League history to hit home runs in his first three at-bats of the season. In spite of Rhodes' unexpected home run barrage, the Cubs lose the game, 12–8.
- April 8 – Kent Mercker of the Atlanta Braves pitches a 6–0 no-hitter against the Los Angeles Dodgers at Dodger Stadium, striking out 10 in the process. For Mercker, it is his first complete game in the Major Leagues. In the first half of the ninth inning, Chan Ho Park comes on to pitch for the Dodgers, becoming the first Korean player to appear in a Major League game. It is still the Braves most recent no-hitter as of 2022.
- April 27 – In a first for the Hubert H. Humphrey Metrodome, Scott Erickson of the Minnesota Twins no-hits the Milwaukee Brewers 6–0.

=== June ===
- June 13 – Ryne Sandberg announces his first retirement from the Chicago Cubs; he would return for two more seasons in 1996.

=== July ===
- July 8 – In a game against the Seattle Mariners, shortstop John Valentin of the Boston Red Sox records the tenth unassisted triple play in Major League history. It is the first unassisted triple play for a player in the American League since 1968, which is also the last time it is accomplished by a shortstop. Boston wins, 4–3. In addition, it is the debut game for Alex Rodriguez in the Major Leagues.
- July 12 – Moisés Alou's double in the 10th inning gives the National League an 8–7 victory over the American League in the All-Star Game. The NL is now a perfect 9–0 in extra-inning contests. John Hudek of the Houston Astros becomes the first pitcher in Major League history to appear in an All-Star Game before recording a victory in the regular season. Fred McGriff, whose two-run home run in the ninth inning ties the score, takes MVP honors.
- July 14 – Ozzie Smith of the St. Louis Cardinals records his 8,017th assist, breaking Luis Aparicio's MLB record for shortstops.
- July 18 – Trailing 11–0 to the St. Louis Cardinals, the Houston Astros come back to win 15–12 in Houston.
- July 19 – Two hours before the Seattle Mariners are scheduled to play the Baltimore Orioles, four tiles fall from the ceiling of the Kingdome, causing that night's game to be canceled and forcing the Mariners to play their final 20 games of the season on the road before the season is cut short by the players' strike.
- July 28:
  - The Major League Baseball Players Association executive board sets August 12 as a strike date.
  - Kenny Rogers of the Texas Rangers throws the fourteenth perfect game in Major League history against the California Angels.

=== August ===
- August 5 – Atlanta Braves first baseman Fred McGriff hit his 30th home run of the season in the Braves' 16–6 victory over the Cincinnati Reds, making him only the 9th player in Major League Baseball history to hit 30 or more homers in seven consecutive seasons.
- August 11:
  - The final games of the Major League Baseball season are played on this date. The next day, the players' strike begins. Minor League Baseball games are not affected.
  - The Colorado Rockies unknowingly play their last game at Mile High Stadium, losing 13–0 to the Atlanta Braves. Greg Maddux throws a 3-hit shutout for Atlanta.

=== September ===
- September 14 – The owners of the Major League clubs vote 26–2 to officially cancel the remainder of the 1994 season, including the playoffs and World Series. There is no World Series for the first time since 1904.
- September 20 – The Albuquerque Dukes end the professional baseball season in the United States, winning the Pacific Coast League championship.

=== October ===
- October 18 – Buck Showalter of the New York Yankees was named American League Manager of the Year.
- October 22 – The Japan Series begins as baseball's professional championship. Reporters from major American newspapers arrive in Japan for their Fall Classic coverage. Ken Harrelson, the play-by-play announcer for the Chicago White Sox, calls the Japan Series for US audiences on regional sports networks under the Prime SportsChannel banner.
- October 26 – Frank Thomas of the Chicago White Sox repeated as American League MVP as he got 24 of the 28 first-place votes.
- October 27 – Jeff Bagwell of the Houston Astros unanimously wins the National League MVP Award after getting all 28 first-place votes, becoming only the fourth unanimous MVP winner in NL history, and the first Astros player to win the award in franchise history.
- October 29 – The Yomiuri Giants win Game 6 of the Japan Series to become professional baseball's World Champions. Legend says this is the luckiest of all championship years, as it is the team's sixtieth anniversary, as they are deemed world champions by some baseball media.

=== November ===
- November 4 – Free agent pitcher Dwight Gooden is suspended for the entire 1995 season after testing positive for cocaine while already serving a 60-day suspension for a previous positive cocaine test.

=== December ===
- December 27 – The Chiba Lotte Marines announce they have signed major league players Julio Franco, Pete Incaviglia and Eric Hillman to contracts, and named Bobby Valentine as their manager, making Valentine the first American born manager in professional baseball in Japan.

== Movies ==
- Angels in the Outfield
- Baseball: A Film by Ken Burns (TV)
- Cobb
- Home Run: Baseball in the Movies (TV)
- Little Big League
- Major League II
- Scout, The

== Births ==
=== January ===
- January 1 – LaMonte Wade
- January 2 – Félix Jorge
- January 4 – Reynaldo López
- January 10 – Rico Garcia
- January 15 – Skye Bolt
- January 16 – Austin Allen
- January 17 – Colin Poche
- January 18 – Diego Castillo
- January 18 – Max Fried
- January 20 – Ricardo Pinto
- January 21 – Jake Cronenworth
- January 22 – Tyrone Taylor
- January 23 – Humberto Arteaga
- January 23 – Addison Russell
- January 24 – Jared Koenig
- January 31 – Cole Irvin
- January 31 – Jake Thompson
- January 31 – Rob Whalen

=== February ===
- February 3 – Brooks Kriske
- February 3 – Rougned Odor
- February 4 – Chris Gittens
- February 4 – Raimel Tapia
- February 6 – David Paulino
- February 6 – Naoyuki Uwasawa
- February 11 – Dansby Swanson
- February 15 – Tzu-Wei Lin
- February 20 – Luis Severino
- February 21 – Sam Hilliard
- February 21 – Zach Remillard
- February 22 – Brett Sullivan
- February 23 – Joe McCarthy
- February 27 – Matt Peacock
- February 28 – Yonathan Daza

=== March ===
- March 2 – James Kaprielian
- March 3 – Dilson Herrera
- March 3 – José Rondón
- March 5 – John Schreiber
- March 6 – Domingo Acevedo
- March 7 – Zach Green
- March 7 – Jairo Labourt
- March 8 – Jake Noll
- March 9 – Yennier Canó
- March 15 – Mike Brosseau
- March 15 – Sean Poppen
- March 15 – Norge Ruiz
- March 16 – Kyle Funkhouser
- March 20 – Justin Garza
- March 22 – Drew Anderson
- March 22 – Edwin Díaz
- March 22 – Daniel Robertson
- March 24 – Kevin Ginkel
- March 29 – Matt Olson
- March 30 – Alex Bregman
- March 31 – Ryan Borucki

=== April ===
- April 1 – David Dahl
- April 4 – Renato Núñez
- April 6 – Ralph Garza Jr.
- April 6 – Jesse Scholtens
- April 7 – Josh Hader
- April 7 – Joel Payamps
- April 8 – Zach Eflin
- April 9 – Caleb Baragar
- April 12 – Shintaro Fujinami
- April 12 – Tomas Nido
- April 15 – Trey Wingenter
- April 16 – Albert Almora
- April 19 – Tyler Jay
- April 21 – Ryan Hartman
- April 21 – Edwin Ríos
- April 22 – Aristides Aquino
- April 23 – Garrett Cleavinger
- April 25 – Cody Ponce
- April 26 – Trevor Lane
- April 27 – Michael Rucker
- April 27 – Corey Seager
- April 28 – Ben Braymer
- April 28 – Thomas Pannone
- April 29 – Scott Kingery
- April 30 – José Peraza

=== May ===
- May 1 – Dillon Tate
- May 2 – Penn Murfee
- May 3 – Walker Lockett
- May 4 – Ryan Meisinger
- May 5 – Beau Sulser
- May 7 – Ángel Perdomo
- May 8 – Lewis Brinson
- May 10 – Lucas Sims
- May 10 – Andy Young
- May 11 – Jackson Stephens
- May 12 – Jesmuel Valentín
- May 14 – Tony Gonsolin
- May 16 – Heath Fillmyer
- May 16 – Michael Petersen
- May 18 – Randy Rosario
- May 22 – Rio Ruiz
- May 24 – Cam Hill
- May 25 – Kyle Holder
- May 25 – Donnie Walton
- May 26 – Sam Haggerty
- May 27 – José Berríos
- May 27 – Josh Guyer
- May 27 – Danny Young
- May 28 – Ryan Burr
- May 29 – Robbie Perkins
- May 29 – Ka'ai Tom
- May 30 – Brett Phillips
- May 30 – Collin Wiles
- May 31 – Dylan Cozens
- May 31 – David Fletcher

=== June ===
- June 1 – Andrew Stevenson
- June 2 – Andrew Moore
- June 3 – Harrison Bader
- June 3 – Ramón Urías
- June 3 – Brandon Waddell
- June 4 – Yency Almonte
- June 4 – Cody Stashak
- June 6 – Brandyn Sittinger
- June 7 – Ryder Jones
- June 17 – Ryan Fitzgerald
- June 20 – Tom Eshelman
- June 21 – Brian Keller
- June 22 – Engelb Vielma
- June 24 – Tim Lopes
- June 26 – Eli White
- June 28 – Spencer Bivens
- June 28 – José Cuas
- June 29 – Travis Lakins
- June 30 – Rogelio Armenteros
- June 30 – Joshua Rojas

=== July ===
- July 1 – Jaylin Davis
- July 1 – Chris Flexen
- July 5 – Shohei Ohtani
- July 6 – Andrew Benintendi
- July 6 – Brandon Lowe
- July 8 – Stephen Gonsalves
- July 8 – Patrick Weigel
- July 10 – Josh Rogers
- July 11 – Jon Duplantier
- July 12 – JD Hammer
- July 12 – Nathan Lukes
- July 13 – Ty France
- July 14 – Tyler Alexander
- July 14 – Armando Alvarez
- July 14 – Jake Cousins
- July 14 – Lucas Giolito
- July 14 – Carson Kelly
- July 14 – Andrew Velazquez
- July 15 – Ramón Laureano
- July 15 – Emmanuel Ramírez
- July 16 – Phil Diehl
- July 17 – Josh Lester
- July 18 – Ryan Helsley
- July 19 – Mauricio Dubón
- July 20 – Anthony Alford
- July 20 – Taylor Kohlwey
- July 20 – Duane Underwood Jr.
- July 22 – Tanner Scott
- July 28 – Walker Buehler
- July 30 – Cody Poteet

=== August ===
- August 1 – Dylan Lee
- August 2 – Mark Mathias
- August 4 – Orlando Arcia
- August 4 – Brett Kennedy
- August 8 – Kazuki Tanaka
- August 9 – Kyle Cody
- August 9 – Ben DeLuzio
- August 10 – Chance Adams
- August 12 – Ian Happ
- August 18 – Seiya Suzuki
- August 19 – Alex De Goti
- August 23 – Billy McKinney
- August 24 – Jamie Callahan
- August 24 – Steven Wilson
- August 25 – Johan Quezada
- August 26 – Tyler Wells
- August 28 – Kelvin Gutiérrez
- August 29 – Seth Martinez
- August 29 – Alex Reyes
- August 30 – Taylor Hearn
- August 30 – Daniel Robert

=== September ===
- September 2 – Franchy Cordero
- September 2 – Rob Kaminsky
- September 6 – Clint Frazier
- September 6 – Harold Ramírez
- September 9 – Wil Crowe
- September 10 – Ray Kerr
- September 10 – Dustin Peterson
- September 11 – Ryan Aguilar
- September 11 – Evan Phillips
- September 11 – Weston Wilson
- September 12 – Tyler Danish
- September 14 – Jake Brentz
- September 14 – John King
- September 15 – Tres Barrera
- September 15 – Dakota Hudson
- September 17 – Daniel Castano
- September 17 – Anderson Severino
- September 17 – Mike Shawaryn
- September 19 – Luke Raley
- September 20 – Kramer Robertson
- September 21 – Devin Williams
- September 22 – Carlos Correa
- September 22 – Corey Ray
- September 27 – Alex Call
- September 27 – Luis Guillorme
- September 27 – Pedro Payano
- September 28 – Manuel Margot
- September 29 – Thomas Hatch
- September 29 – Tyler Mahle
- September 30 – Travis Demeritte
- September 30 – Damon Jones

=== October ===
- October 1 – Cedric Mullins
- October 3 – Jen-Ho Tseng
- October 4 – Shea Spitzbarth
- October 5 – Víctor Reyes
- October 7 – Kirby Snead
- October 7 – Kohl Stewart
- October 8 – Gosuke Katoh
- October 8 – Cody Thomas
- October 10 – David Bednar
- October 10 – Garrett Hampson
- October 10 – Sean Murphy
- October 12 – Max Schrock
- October 13 – José Godoy
- October 17 – Adam Oller
- October 17 – Myles Straw
- October 19 – Brandon Bailey
- October 19 – Anthony Santander
- October 20 – Ronald Guzmán
- October 21 – Ben Bowden
- October 21 – Matt Krook
- October 21 – José Ruiz
- October 22 – Corbin Burnes
- October 24 – Trey Amburgey
- October 24 – Peter Strzelecki
- October 24 – Taylor Widener
- October 26 – Jack Kruger
- October 26 – Joe Palumbo
- October 29 – Shaun Anderson

=== November ===
- November 1 – Braden Bristo
- November 1 – Anthony Misiewicz
- November 1 – Brent Rooker
- November 2 – Jonathan Loáisiga
- November 4 – Willie Calhoun
- November 9 – Erick Mejia
- November 13 – Santiago Espinal
- November 16 – Will Craig
- November 17 – Adonis Rosa
- November 18 – Jimmy Lambert
- November 20 – Jake Newberry
- November 20 – Jacob Robson
- November 21 – Elier Hernández
- November 22 – Griffin Jax
- November 23 – Tyler Wade
- November 25 – Seranthony Domínguez
- November 25 – Justin Lawrence
- November 27 – Brennon Lund
- November 28 – Miguel Díaz
- November 28 – Cooper Hummel
- November 30 – Tanner Tully

=== December ===
- December 1 – Josh Walker
- December 2 – Bryan Baker
- December 7 – Pete Alonso
- December 9 – Hunter Harvey
- December 10 – Nestor Cortés Jr.
- December 10 – Sheldon Neuse
- December 14 – Ryan McMahon
- December 14 – Chuckie Robinson
- December 15 – Johneshwy Fargas
- December 15 – David MacKinnon
- December 16 – Ryan Hendrix
- December 16 – Oscar Mercado
- December 20 – Dane Dunning
- December 22 – C. J. Chatham
- December 22 – Richie Martin
- December 24 – Miguel Castro
- December 24 – Fernando Romero
- December 25 – Nabil Crismatt
- December 25 – Zach Jackson
- December 28 – Darío Agrazal
- December 28 – Mitch White
- December 29 – Dustin Fowler
- December 29 – Brian Navarreto
- December 29 – Chris Okey
- December 30 – Nick Hernandez
- December 31 – Dawel Lugo

== Deaths ==
=== January ===
- January 2 – Eddie Smith, 80, two-time All-Star pitcher for the Philadelphia Athletics, Chicago White Sox and Boston Red Sox in a span of ten seasons from 1936 to 1947, also known as the pitcher whom Joe DiMaggio started his legendary 56-game hitting streak on May 15, 1941.
- January 4 – Billy Sullivan Jr., 83, catcher who played 962 games over 12 seasons spanning 1931 to 1947 for seven MLB teams; his father, Billy Sr., was top-flight catcher during first two decades of the 20th century.
- January 5 – Jack Brittin, 69, pitcher who appeared briefly for the Philadelphia Phillies in the 1950 and 1951 seasons.
- January 8 – Harvey Haddix, 68, three-time All-Star and two-time Gold Glove pitcher for the St. Louis Cardinals, Philadelphia Phillies, Cincinnati Redlegs, Pittsburgh Pirates and Baltimore Orioles from 1952 through 1965, who will always be remembered for throwing a perfect game over 12 full innings while pitching for Pittsburgh against the Milwaukee Braves on May 26, 1959; he lost the perfecto, the no-hitter, the shutout, and the game in the 13th inning after a fielding error, one-out intentional walk, and a double by Joe Adcock (which would have been a home run had he not passed Hank Aaron on the bases), saddling Haddix with a one-hit, 1–0 defeat; later a pitching coach for five MLB clubs between 1966 and 1984.
- January 9 – Johnny Temple, 66, six-time All-Star second baseman who played for the Cincinnati Reds/Redlegs, Cleveland Indians, Baltimore Orioles and Houston Colt .45s from 1952 to 1964, hitting .300 or better three times and tying for the National League lead in walks in 1957 with 94, while receiving 648 walks and striking out only 338 times in 6,035 plate appearances.
- January 10 – Chub Feeney, 72, National League president from 1970 to 1986, then briefly club president of the San Diego Padres (1987–1988); previously vice president and de facto general manager of the New York/San Francisco Giants from 1946 through 1969; grandson of Charles Stoneham and nephew of Horace Stoneham.
- January 11 – Joe Sprinz, 91, backup catcher who played with the Cleveland Indians from 1930 to 1931 and for the St. Louis Cardinals in 1933.
- January 11 – Lucas Turk, 95, pitcher who hurled in five games for the 1922 Washington Senators.
- January 14 – Sam Vico, 70, first baseman who played from 1948 to 1949 for the Detroit Tigers.
- January 22 – Rudy Miller, 93, backup infielder for the 1929 Philadelphia Athletics.
- January 23 – Stan Landes, 70, National League umpire (1955–1972) who worked 2,874 NL games, three World Series and three All-Star games.
- January 24 – Pat Crawford, 91, infielder for three different National League teams from 1929 to 1934, including the 1934 World Champions St. Louis Cardinals.
- January 27 – Sherm Feller, 75, Boston radio personality who was the public address announcer at Fenway Park from 1967 through 1993; also a composer of popular songs.

=== February ===
- February 6 – Bill Chamberlain, 84, pitcher for the 1932 Chicago White Sox.
- February 6 – Ross Grimsley, 71, pitcher who played for the Chicago White Sox in 1951, also the father of pitcher Ross Grimsley Jr.
- February 6 – Frank Whitman, 69, shortstop who played for the Chicago White Sox in a span of two seasons from 1946 to 1948.
- February 8 – Robert O. Reynolds, 79, broadcasting executive who, with business partner Gene Autry, was a founding co-owner of the Los Angeles Angels when they entered the American League in 1961; served as president of the Angels through 1975; star tackle for Stanford University's gridiron team who became member of the College Football of Fame.
- February 9 – Ray Lamanno, 74, All-Star (1946) catcher for the Cincinnati Reds who appeared in 442 career games over five seasons spanning 1941 and 1948.
- February 9 – Joe Mowry, 85, backup outfielder for the 1933 Boston Braves.
- February 9 – Sam Parrilla, 50, Puerto Rican left fielder who played in 11 games for the 1970 Philadelphia Phillies.
- February 12 – Ray Dandridge, 80, Hall of Fame third baseman of the Negro leagues and Minor League Baseball, who posted a career average of .355, appeared in three East–West All-Star Games, and earned American Association MVP Award honors in 1951.
- February 15 – Ray Blemker, 56, pitcher who appeared in just one game for the Kansas City Athletics in 1960.
- February 24 – Bill Clemensen, 74, pitcher for the Pittsburgh Pirates during three World War II-interrupted seasons spanning 1939–1946.
- February 24 – Jim McKnight, 57, third baseman whose career lasted for 19 years from 1955 to 1972, including stints for the Chicago Cubs in 1960 and 1962; managed Class A Decatur Commodores in 1972, while appearing in 1,954 minor league games; father of Jeff McKnight.

=== March ===
- March 1 – Joe Tipton, 72, backup catcher who appeared in 417 games from 1948 to 1954 for four American League teams; in a one-sided trade, swapped by the White Sox to the Philadelphia Athletics even up for eventual Hall of Famer Nellie Fox on October 19, 1949; in 1959, as a minor leaguer, embroiled in a gambling controversy that resulted in banishment from Organized Ball.
- March 2 – Butch Sutcliffe, 78, catcher for the 1938 Boston Bees.
- March 4 – Louis Brower, 93, shortstop who played with the Detroit Tigers in 1931.
- March 7 – Stew Hofferth, 81, catcher who played in 136 games from 1944 through 1946 for the Boston Braves.
- March 9 – Elbie Fletcher, 77, All-Star first baseman who played for the Boston Braves/Bees and Pittsburgh Pirates in a span of 12 seasons from 1934 to 1949.
- March 10 – Jim Brenneman, 53, pitcher who made three appearances for the New York Yankees in 1965, and also was the winning pitcher of their 1965 Hall of Fame exhibition game against the Philadelphia Phillies at Doubleday Field in Cooperstown, New York.
- March 10 – Jim Honochick, 76, American League umpire (1949 to 1973) who worked in 3,815 regular-season games, six World Series and four All-Star games.
- March 12 – Gordy Coleman, 59, first baseman who played from 1959 through 1967 for the Cleveland Indians and Cincinnati Reds and helped the Reds capture the 1961 National League pennant.
- March 13 – Buddy Rosar, 79, solid defensive catcher for the New York Yankees, Cleveland Indians, Philadelphia Athletics and Boston Red Sox in 13 seasons from 1939 through 1951, also a five-time All-Star and member of the 1941 World Series champion Yankees, who is one of only three catchers in Major League history to catch at least 100 games in a single season without committing an error, while setting a record for consecutive games without an error by a catcher.
- March 14 – Tony Freitas, 85, pitcher in 107 games for the Philadelphia Athletics and Cincinnati Reds for five seasons (1932–1936); veteran minor-league hurler who earned the most career wins by a left-hander with 342, while tying for first with twenty or more wins over nine seasons; his active career encompassed 23 seasons between 1928 and 1953, with three years lost to World War II service.
- March 16 – Eric Show, 37, pitcher for the San Diego Padres and Oakland Athletics over eleven seasons from 1981 to 1991, who gained notoriety for giving up Pete Rose his 4,192nd hit, which surpassed the long-standing record for most career hits held by Ty Cobb.
- March 23 – Roger Wolff, 82, knuckleball pitcher who played for the Philadelphia Athletics, Washington Senators, Cleveland Indians and Pittsburgh Pirates during seven seasons spanning 1941–1947.
- March 25 – Bob Fontaine Sr., 70, general manager of the San Diego Padres from September 23, 1977 to July 6, 1980; former minor-league pitcher who also served as a scout and scouting/player development director between 1951 and 1992.
- March 29 – Ray Bare, 44, pitcher who made 88 appearances for the St. Louis Cardinals and Detroit Tigers over five seasons spanning 1972 to 1977.

=== April ===
- April 2 − Gil Paulsen, 91, who made a pitching appearance with the St. Louis Cardinals in its 1925 season.
- April 5 − Bobby Hofman, 68, backup infielder who played for the New York Giants during seven seasons between 1949 and 1957, including their 1954 World Series champions, and later coached for three American League clubs from 1966 through 1978.
- April 6 − William Ford, 80, pitcher for the Detroit Tigers in the 1945 season.
- April 6 – Goody Rosen, 81, Canadian All-Star center fielder who played for the Brooklyn Dodgers and New York Giants over six seasons spanning 1937–1946; member of the Canadian Baseball Hall of Fame.
- April 17 – Walter Wilson, 80, pitcher for the 1945 Detroit Tigers.
- April 19 – Virginia Bell, 66, All-American Girls Professional Baseball League pitcher and outfielder, who also served for the Women's Army Corps in Japan during World War II.
- April 24 – Martinez Jackson, 89, Negro leagues second baseman who played for the Newark Eagles in the 1930s, best known for being the father of Hall of Famer Reggie Jackson.
- April 25 – Gordon Jones, 64, pitcher who spent all or parts of ten seasons in the majors between 1954 and 1965 for the St. Louis Cardinals, New York/San Francisco Giants, Baltimore Orioles, Kansas City Athletics and Houston Colt .45s/Astros; briefly the Astros' pitching coach.
- April 25 – Mike Kreevich, 85, All-Star center fielder who played for the Chicago Cubs, Chicago White Sox, Philadelphia Athletics, St. Louis Browns and Washington Senators in a span of twelve seasons from 1931 to 1945, hitting .300 or better four times and leading the American League in triples with 16 in 1937.

=== May ===
- May 2 – Buck Fausett, 86, 19-year minor league veteran who played in 13 games as a third baseman and pitcher as a 36-year-old rookie for the Cincinnati Reds during the wartime 1944 season.
- May 5 – Tony DePhillips, 81, backup catcher who played in 1943 for the Cincinnati Reds.
- May 9 – Ralph Brickner, 69, pitcher for the 1952 Boston Red Sox.
- May 8 – Jim Finks, 66, player and longtime executive in professional football (Calgary Stampeders, Minnesota Vikings, Chicago Bears) who served two seasons (1983–1984) as president of the Chicago Cubs.
- May 11 – Bennie Warren, 82, catcher who played for the Philadelphia and the New York Giants in a span of six seasons from 1939 to 1947.
- May 12 – Si Johnson, 87, pitcher who went 101–165 (4.09) in 492 mound appearances with the Cincinnati Reds, St. Louis Cardinals, Philadelphia Phillies and Boston Braves in all or part of 17 seasons spanning 1928–1947.
- May 15 – Showboat Fisher, 95, outfielder who played for the Washington Senators, St. Louis Cardinals and St. Louis Browns over during four seasons between 1923 and 1932, as well as the last surviving member of the 1924 Senators, the first MLB club based in Washington, D.C. to win a World Series title.
- May 26 – Red Treadway, 74, backup outfielder who played from 1944 to 1945 for the New York Giants.

=== June ===
- June 1 – Bill Webb, 80, pitcher for the 1943 Philadelphia Phillies.
- June 2 – Mort Flohr, 82, pitcher who played for the Philadelphia Athletics during the 1934 season.
- June 10 – Vic Bradford, 79, outfielder for the New York Giants in 1943
- June 12 – Jim Brock, 57, coach at Arizona State since 1972 who led the school to two College World Series titles.
- June 14 – Monte Weaver, 87, pitcher who posted a 71–50 record in 201 games between 1931 and 1939 for the Washington Senators and Boston Red Sox; went 22–10 for 1932 Senators and was a member of their AL champions the following season.
- June 16 – Marlin Stuart, 75, pitcher for the Detroit Tigers, St. Louis Browns, Baltimore Orioles and New York Yankees in a span of six seasons from 1949 to 1954.
- June 20 – Norm Wallen, 76, third baseman for the Boston Braves during the 1945 season.
- June 23 – Joe Dobson, 77, All-Star pitcher who posted a 137–103 record in 14 seasons between 1939 and 1954, playing his first two years with the Cleveland Indians, nine with the Boston Red Sox and three with the Chicago White Sox; helped lead Red Sox to the 1946 American League pennant with a 13-7 record and followed with a career-best 18-8 season in 1947; threw a four-hitter to give Boston a 3-2 lead in the 1946 World Series over the St. Louis Cardinals, and pitched in relief in two other games of the Series.
- June 23 – Marv Throneberry, 62, backup first baseman for the New York Yankees, Kansas City Athletics and Baltimore Orioles over part of five seasons before joining the expansion New York Mets in 1962, with whom he became a starter for the first time; the 1962 club, dubbed the Amazin' Mets, posted a 40–120 record in its inaugural season; older brother Faye was an MLB outfielder.
- June 27 – Alan Strange, 87, backup shortstop for the St. Louis Browns and Washington Senators during five seasons spanning 1934–1942.
- June 29 – Ray Mueller, 82, All-Star catcher—nicknamed Iron Man—for the Boston Braves/Bees, Cincinnati Reds, New York Giants and Pittsburgh Pirates in 14 seasons between 1935 and 1951; set a National League record with 233 consecutive games caught between 1943 and 1946; started every one of Cincinnati's 155 regular-season games and caught 1,355 of the club's 1,3981/3 defensive innings played in 1944.
- June 30 – Don Kolloway, 75, second baseman and first baseman who played all or parts of a dozen seasons between 1940 and 1953 for the Chicago White Sox, Detroit Tigers and Philadelphia Athletics.

=== July ===
- July 4 – Cal Cooper, 71, pitcher for the Washington Senators in the 1948 season.
- July 4 – Tex Hoyle, 72, relief pitcher for the Philadelphia Athletics during the 1952 season.
- July 5 – Bernie DeViveiros, 93, shortstop who played with the Chicago White Sox in 1924 and for the Detroit Tigers in 1927; longtime scout and base-running instructor.
- July 5 – Ron Law, 48, Canadian relief pitcher for the Cleveland Indians during the 1969 season.
- July 13 – Jimmie Reese, 93, infielder for the New York Yankees (when his roommate was Babe Ruth) and St. Louis Cardinals from 1930 to 1932; later a longtime coach in the Pacific Coast League and, in the majors, for the California Angels (1973 until his death).
- July 14 – César Tovar, 54, infield/outfield utility player who spent a dozen seasons in the majors, notably with the Minnesota Twins from 1965 to 1972; second major leaguer (after Bert Campaneris) to play all nine positions in a game (September 22, 1968); once slugged a walk-off home run to hit for the cycle (September 19, 1972); regarded as the all-time leader in breaking up no-hit attempts (five); led the American League in doubles, triples, and hits at different points in his career.
- July 19 – Idona Crigler, 72, All-American Girls Professional Baseball League player.
- July 26 – Roland Gladu, 83, Canadian third baseman for the 1944 Boston Braves.
- July 26 – Herm Holshouser, 87, pitcher who played in 25 games for the 1930 St. Louis Browns.
- July 31 – Hy Vandenberg, 88, pitcher for the Boston Red Sox, New York Giants and Chicago Cubs in a span of seven seasons between 1935 and 1945, and also a member of the Giants and Cubs teams that clinched the National League pennant in 1937 and 1945, respectively.

=== August ===
- August 1 – Bernie James, 88, middle infielder in 114 career games for 1929–1930 Boston Braves and 1933 New York Giants; member of 1933 World Series champions.
- August 2 – Dick Jones, 92, pitcher who played for the Washington Senators in the 1926 and 1927 seasons.
- August 7 – Nev Chandler, 47, Cleveland sportscaster who teamed with ex-pitcher Herb Score on Indians' radio broadcasts from 1980 to 1984.
- August 15 – Joe Brovia, 72, who made 21 appearances as a pinch-hitter with the 1955 Cincinnati Redlegs, previously a prolific hitter and long time All-Star outfielder at Triple-A Pacific Coast League between 1941 and 1955, while collecting a lifetime .311 average with 214 home runs, 1,846 hits and 1,144 RBIs in 1,805 games.
- August 23 – Jim Prendergast, 77, pitcher who played for the Boston Braves in 1948.
- August 25 – Cliff Garrison, 88, pitcher for the 1928 Boston Red Sox.
- August 27 – Sig Gryska, 79, shortstop who played from 1938 to 1939 with the St. Louis Browns.
- August 28 – Dain Clay, 74, outfielder for the Cincinnati Reds in a span of four seasons from 1943 to 1946.
- August 31 – Mike Garbark, 78, backup catcher for the New York Yankees over two seasons between 1944 and 1945.

=== September ===
- September 1 – Bob Greenwood, 66, Mexican pitcher for the Philadelphia Phillies during two seasons from 1954 to 1955.
- September 5 – Hank Aguirre, 63, three-time All-Star pitcher who played for four teams in 16 seasons from 1955 to 1970; spent most of his career with the 1958–1967 Detroit Tigers; his best season came in 1962, when he went 16–8 and led the American League with a 2.21 ERA; after briefly coaching for the Chicago Cubs, became a successful entrepreneur in auto parts industry.
- September 6 – Rita Briggs, 65, AAGPBL All-Star catcher.
- September 12 – Hunter Lane, 94, third baseman for the 1924 Boston Braves .
- September 16 – Harry Chozen, 78, catcher who appeared in just a game for the Cincinnati Reds in 1937.
- September 16 – Shirley Stovroff, 63, AAGPBL catcher and a member of two championship teams.
- September 28 – Owen Scheetz, 80, pitcher who appeared in six games for the Washington Senators in 1943.

=== October ===
- October 5 – Lee Gamble, 84, backup left fielder for the Cincinnati Reds over parts of four seasons from 1935 to 1940, including the team that won the National League pennant in 1939.
- October 7 – Stan Ferens, 79, left-handed pitcher who played in 53 total games for the St. Louis Browns during the 1942 and 1946 seasons.
- October 11 – Bobby Brooks, 48, backup outfielder who played from 1969 through 1972 for the Oakland Athletics and California Angels.
- October 11 – Charlie Cuellar, 77, pitcher for the 1950 Chicago White Sox.
- October 17 – Joe Paparella, 85, American League umpire for 20 years (1946–1965) who worked in four World Series, four All-Star contests, and 3,143 league games.
- October 25 – George Fallon, 80, middle infielder who played with the Brooklyn Dodgers in 1937 and for the St. Louis Cardinals from 1943 to 1945.
- October 30 – Frank Coggins, 50, backup second baseman for the Washington Senators and Chicago Cubs in a span of three seasons from 1967 to 1972.

=== November ===
- November 4 – George Bradshaw, 70, catcher for the 1952 Washington Senators.
- November 5 – Gene Desautels, 87, light-hitting catcher with a good glove and strong arm, who spent 19 years in baseball, including 13 major league seasons with the Detroit Tigers, Boston Red Sox, Cleveland Indians and Philadelphia Athletics between 1930 and 1946.
- November 5 – Joe Hague, 50, first baseman and right fielder who played from 1968 through 1973 for the St. Louis Cardinals and Cincinnati Reds.
- November 5 – Tim McNamara, 95, pitcher for the Boston Braves and New York Giants during five seasons from 1922 to 1926.
- November 6 – Erv Dusak, 74, two-way player who pitched and played at first base and outfield for the St. Louis Cardinals and the Pittsburgh Pirates, appearing in ten seasons spanning 1941–1952 and helping St. Louis win the 1946 World Series, while going 0–3 with a 5.33 ERA in 23 pitching appearances, and hitting a slash line of .243 / .334 / .355 with 24 home runs and 106 RBI in 413 career games.
- November 11 – Ed Madjeski, 86, catcher who played for the Philadelphia Athletics, Chicago White Sox and New York Giants over part of four seasons from 1932 to 1937.
- November 16 – Russ Meers, 75, pitcher for the Chicago Cubs during three seasons between 1941 and 1947.
- November 27 – Glen Moulder, 77, pitcher who played with the Brooklyn Dodgers, St. Louis Browns and Chicago White Sox over three seasons from 1946 to 1948.
- November 29 – Charley Smith, 57, solid defensive third baseman who hit .239 with 69 home runs and 281 RBI in ten seasons for seven teams from 1960 to 1969, perhaps best known for being involved in some of the most significant trades of the 1960s, as a key component in deals that included All-Stars such as Ken Boyer, Turk Farrell, Roger Maris and Roy Sievers.

=== December ===
- December 3 – Woody Abernathy, 79, pitcher who worked in 16 games, 15 in relief, for the New York Giants (1946–1947).
- December 3 – Earl Johnson, 75, pitcher whose career spanned seven seasons from 1941 to 1951, playing with the Boston Red Sox and Detroit Tigers, who was also notable for being a World War II hero, as his actions earned him a Silver and Bronze Star for his meritorious service in a hazardous mission.
- December 4 – Russ Scarritt, 91, left fielder who played from 1929 through 1932 for the Boston Red Sox and Philadelphia Phillies, who in 1929 set a still-standing record for a Red Sox rookie with 17 triples in a season.
- December 7 – Frank Sacka, 70, catcher who played for the Washington Senators in the 1951 and 1953 seasons.
- December 20 – Larry Crawford, 80, pitcher for the 1937 Philadelphia Phillies.
- December 20 – Bob Wellman, 69, outfielder and first baseman for the Philadelphia Athletics in 1948 and 1950; managed for a quarter-century in the Minor Leagues, winning more than 1,600 games, with his 1966 Spartanburg Phillies setting a Western Carolinas League record by ripping off a 25-game winning streak.
- December 26 – Allie Reynolds, 77, six-time All-Star pitcher for the Cleveland Indians and New York Yankees over 13 seasons spanning 1942–1954, who became the first MLB pitcher to throw two no-hitters in a single season and led the American League in shutouts and strikeouts two times and in ERA once, being also an MVP Award runner-up in 1952 and a part of six Yankees World Series Champion teams between 1947 and 1953.
- December 26 – Tony Robello, 81, second baseman who played in 16 games for 1933–1934 Cincinnati Reds; spent almost 50 years as a scout for four teams, including the Reds, for whom he signed Hall-of-Fame catcher Johnny Bench and other stars.
- December 31 – Mona Denton, 78, pitcher for the South Bend Blue Sox and Kenosha Comets of the All-American Girls Professional Baseball League.
- December 31 – Jack Shepard, 63, catcher for the Pittsburgh Pirates over all or part of four seasons spanning 1953–1956; the Stanford graduate left baseball in the prime of his career and became a successful business executive and philanthropist.
