= 1994 Senior League World Series =

American youth baseball tournament

Tournament information
- Location: Kissimmee, Florida
- Dates: August 14–20, 1994

Final positions
- Champions: Brandon, Florida
- Runner-up: Midland, Michigan

The 1994 Senior League World Series took place from August 14–20 in Kissimmee, Florida, United States. Brandon, Florida defeated Midland, Michigan in the championship game.

== Teams ==
United States	International
(Florida) Union Park, Florida; District 3 Host	Calgary, Alberta Canada
Midland, Michigan Central	Dhahran, Saudi Arabia Europe
(New Jersey) Ringwood, New Jersey East	(Taiwan) Taichung, Taiwan Far East
(Florida) Brandon, Florida South	Maracaibo, Venezuela Latin America
(Nevada) Henderson, Nevada West	

== Results ==
=== Winner's Bracket ===
Opening Game
—	Florida	4
—	(Florida) Host	3

—
1–0	Florida	5
—	New Jersey	1
—	Michigan	5
—	Nevada	4
—	Taiwan	6
—	Venezuela	5
—	Saudi Arabia	14
—	Canada	10

—
2–0	Florida (F/8)	5
1–0	Michigan	4
1–0	Taiwan	13
1–0	Saudi Arabia	0

Bracket Final
3–0	Florida	2
2–0	Taiwan	1

=== Loser's Bracket ===
—
0–1	Canada	3
0–1	Nevada	4
0–1	Venezuela	3
0–1	(Florida) Host	11

—
0–1	New Jersey	7
1–1	(Florida) Host	11
1–1	Saudi Arabia	1
1–1	Nevada	15

—
1–1	Michigan	8
2–1	(Florida) Host	7
2–1	Taiwan	2
2–1	Nevada	4

Bracket Final
2–1	Michigan	5
3–1	Nevada	2

=== Placement Bracket ===
—
0–2	Venezuela	7
0–2	Canada	2

—
1–2	Saudi Arabia	4
1–2	Venezuela	20
2–2	(Florida) Host	7
0–2	New Jersey	1

—
2–2	Taiwan	8
2–2	Venezuela	4
3–2	Nevada	10
3–2	(Florida) Host	6

Third-place game
3–2	Taiwan	7
4–2	Nevada	2

=== Elimination Round ===
Semifinals
3–0	Florida	2
2–0	Taiwan	1
2–1	Michigan	5
3–1	Nevada	2

World championship
4–0	Florida	13
3–1	Michigan	5
Third-place game
3–2	Taiwan	7
4–2	Nevada	2

1994 Senior League World Series Champions
Brandon, Florida
