= C. J. Chatham =

American baseball player (born 1994)

- Shortstop
- Born: December 22, 1994 (age 30); Fort Lauderdale, Florida, U.S.
- Bats: Right Throws: Right

Connor James Chatham (born December 22, 1994) is an American former professional baseball shortstop. He was drafted by the Boston Red Sox in the second round of the 2016 Major League Baseball draft.

== Career ==
=== Boston Red Sox ===
Chatham attended American Heritage High School in Plantation, Florida, and Florida Atlantic University, where he played college baseball for the Florida Atlantic Owls. In 2015, he played collegiate summer baseball with the Bourne Braves of the Cape Cod Baseball League. He was drafted 51st overall in the 2016 Major League Baseball (MLB) draft by the Boston Red Sox. He made his professional debut for the rookie-level Gulf Coast League Red Sox and was later promoted to the Lowell Spinners, where he hit .259/.319/.426 with four home runs in 108 at bats.

In 2017, Chatham missed a majority of the season due to injury and only had 19 at bats all season. He started the 2018 season with the Single-A Greenville Drive, where he batted .307 in 19 games, and was promoted to the High-A Salem Red Sox in May. Overall during 2018, Chatham appeared in 95 games, batting .314 with three home runs and 52 RBI.

Chatham started the 2019 season with the Double-A Portland Sea Dogs, and was promoted to the Triple-A Pawtucket Red Sox on August 13. Overall during the 2019 season with both teams, Chatham batted .298/.333/.408 with five home runs and 46 RBI in 110 games. After the season, on October 10, 2019, he was selected for the United States national baseball team in the 2019 WBSC Premier 12. On November 20, 2019, the Red Sox added Chatham to their 40-man roster.

On March 8, 2020, Chatham was optioned to Triple-A Pawtucket. Chatham did not play in a game in 2020 due to the cancellation of the minor league season because of the COVID-19 pandemic.

=== Philadelphia Phillies ===
On January 18, 2021, Chatham was traded to the Philadelphia Phillies in exchange for a player to be named later (Victor Santos was sent to the Red Sox on July 17). On March 28, Chatham was released by the Phillies. On April 2, Chatham re-signed with the Phillies on a new minor league contract. He was assigned to the Triple-A Lehigh Valley IronPigs to begin the year. Chatham played in 50 games in 2021 for Lehigh Valley, hitting .271 with 3 home runs and 23 RBI's. He elected free agency following the season.

=== Arizona Diamondbacks ===
On November 21, 2021, Chatham signed a minor league contract with the Arizona Diamondbacks. Chatham played in 3 games for the Triple-A Reno Aces, going 2-for-12 before he was released by the Diamondbacks on April 12, 2022.
