= Bennett Sousa =

American baseball player (born 1995)

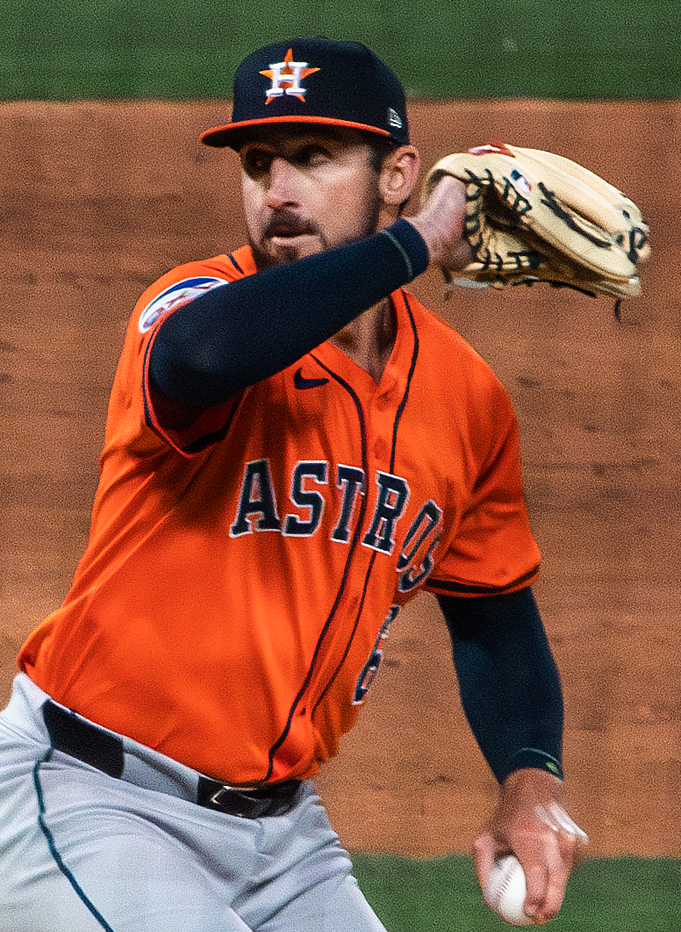
- Sousa in 2025

Houston Astros – No. 62
- Pitcher
- Born: April 6, 1995 (age 31); North Palm Beach, Florida, U.S.
- Bats: Left Throws: Left

MLB debut
- April 8, 2022, for the Chicago White Sox

MLB statistics (through September 19, 2026)
- Win–loss record: 9–4
- Earned run average: 4.61
- Strikeouts: 108
- Stats at Baseball Reference

Teams
- Chicago White Sox (2022); Milwaukee Brewers (2023); Houston Astros (2023, 2025–present)

John Bennett Sousa (born April 6, 1995) is an American professional baseball pitcher for the Houston Astros of Major League Baseball (MLB). He has previously played in MLB for the Chicago White Sox and Milwaukee Brewers.

== Professional career ==
=== Amateur career ===
Sousa attended The Benjamin School in Palm Beach Gardens, Florida, and the University of Virginia, where he played college baseball for the Virginia Cavaliers. In 2015, he played collegiate summer baseball with the Orleans Firebirds of the Cape Cod Baseball League. The Washington Nationals selected Sousa in the 34th round of the 2017 Major League Baseball draft, but he did not sign and returned to Virginia.

=== Chicago White Sox ===
The Chicago White Sox selected Sousa in the 10th round of the 2018 MLB draft. In 20 games, Sousa posted a 2–0 win–loss record and a 1.27 earned run average (ERA). In 2019, Sousa posted an ERA of 2.49 in 43 games with Kannapolis, Winston-Salem, and Birmingham. Sousa was added to the Glendale Desert Dogs roster for 2019 where he posted a 5.59 ERA in 9 games. Sousa did not play in a game in 2020 due to the cancellation of the minor league season because of the COVID-19 pandemic. In 2021, Sousa posted a 3.61 ERA in 41 games while striking out 71 batters in 47 1/3 innings.

The White Sox added Sousa to their 40-man roster after the 2021 season. He was named to the Opening Day roster for the 2022 season. Sousa made his MLB debut on April 8, 2022, pitching a scoreless inning out of the bullpen. Despite having a 3–0 record, after appearing in 25 games and having an ERA of 8.41, Sousa was sent back to Triple-A on June 14.

On February 20, 2023, Sousa was designated for assignment after the signing of Elvis Andrus was made official.

=== Cincinnati Reds ===
On February 22, 2023, Sousa was claimed off waivers by the Cincinnati Reds. Sousa was optioned to the Triple-A Louisville Bats to begin the 2023 season. On April 5, Sousa was designated for assignment following the promotion of Kevin Herget.

=== Milwaukee Brewers ===
On April 9, 2023, Sousa was traded to the Milwaukee Brewers in exchange for cash considerations and international bonus pool space. He made two appearances for Milwaukee before he was placed on the injured list with left shoulder nerve irritation on June 9. Sousa was transferred to the 60–day injured list on July 28. He was activated on August 7, and optioned to the Triple–A Nashville Sounds.

=== Houston Astros ===
On August 29, 2023, the Detroit Tigers claimed Sousa off of waivers. He was designated for assignment by the Tigers on September 1.

On September 3, 2023, Sousa was claimed off waivers by the Houston Astros. He made five scoreless appearances for Houston, registering 8 strikeouts across 6 1/3 innings pitched. On April 4, 2024, Sousa underwent surgery to address thoracic outlet syndrome, ruling him out for the entirety of the season.

Sousa was optioned to the Triple-A Sugar Land Space Cowboys to begin the 2025 season. He got a strikeout on June 7, 2025 with runners on first and second in the bottom of the tenth, sealing a 5–3 win over the Cleveland Guardians and earning his first save of the season. Sousa made 44 appearances for the Astros, compiling a 5–1 record and 2.84 ERA with 59 strikeouts and four saves across 50 2/3 innings pitched. On September 8, it was announced that Sousa would likely miss the remainder of the season due to a mild flexor/pronator strain.

Sousa began the 2026 regular season on the injured list due to an oblique strain. On April 25, 2026, Sousa was removed from the injured list. He returned to the injured list on May 6 with elbow inflammation, and was transferred to the 60-day injured list on July 3. Sousa was activated on July 20. Over 35 appearances in 2026, Sousa went 1–3 and yielded a 6.00 ERA and 1.800 WHIP, striking out 32 in 30 innings pitched. He then made his playoff debut, including one appearances in the 2026 American League Wild Card Series. Sousa allowed one run in one inning of work prior to a sweep of the Astros by the Chicago White Sox.
