= Anderson Severino =

Dominican baseball player (born 1994)

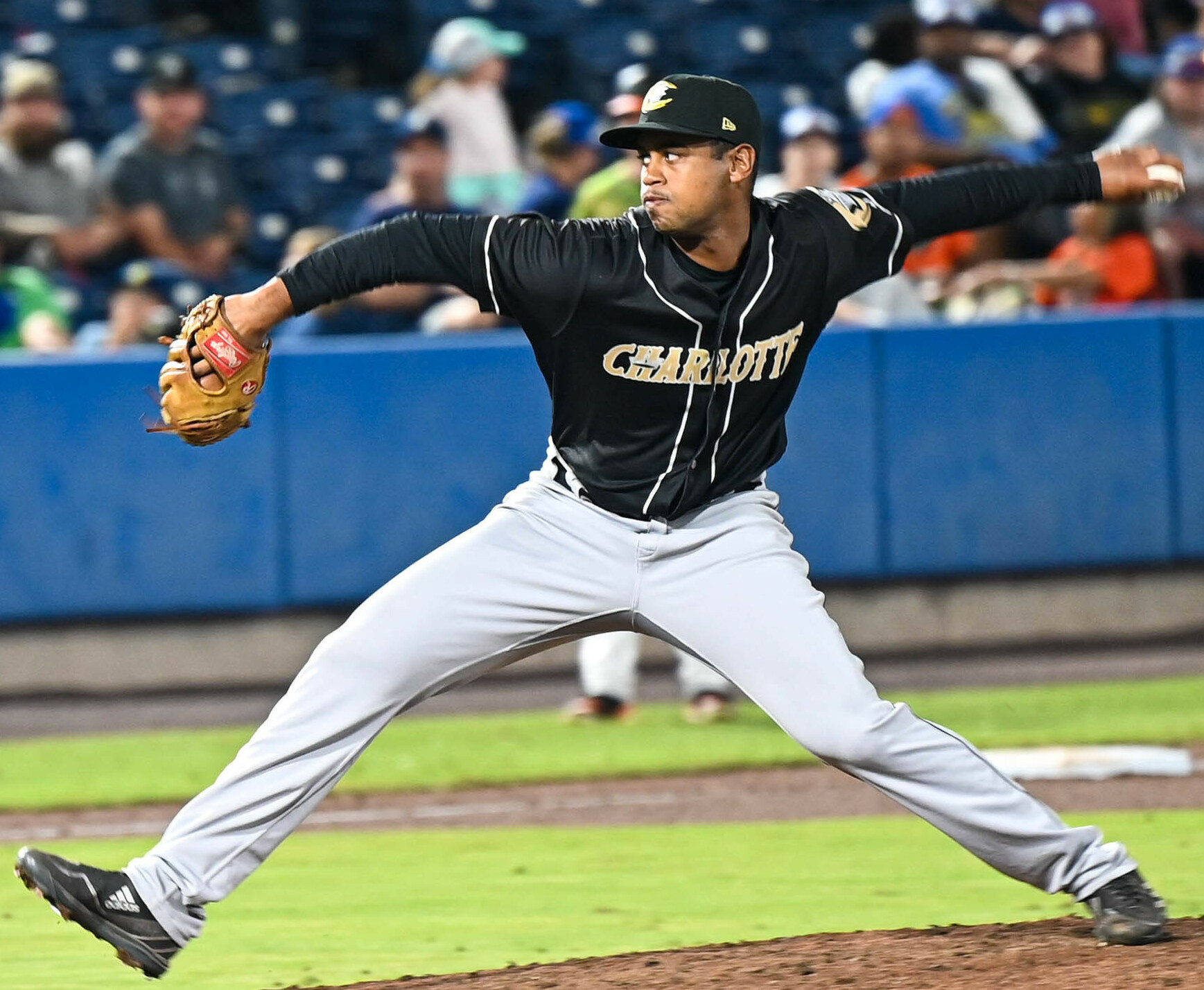
- Severino with the Charlotte Knights in 2022

Hanshin Tigers – No. 97
- Pitcher
- Born: September 17, 1994 (age 32); Santo Domingo, Dominican Republic
- Bats: Left Throws: Left

Professional debut
- MLB: April 14, 2022, for the Chicago White Sox
- NPB: July 15, 2026, for the Hanshin Tigers

MLB statistics (through 2022 season)
- Win–loss record: 0–0
- Earned run average: 6.14
- Strikeouts: 9

NPB statistics (through August 19, 2026)
- Win–loss record: 0–0
- Earned run average: 5.14
- Strikeouts: 8
- Stats at Baseball Reference

Teams
- Chicago White Sox (2022); Hanshin Tigers (2026–present)

Anderson Severino (born September 17, 1994) is a Dominican professional baseball pitcher for the Hanshin Tigers of Nippon Professional Baseball (NPB). He previously played in Major League Baseball (MLB) for the Chicago White Sox.

== Career ==
=== New York Yankees ===
On June 1, 2013, Severino signed a minor league contract with the New York Yankees organization. Severino made his professional debut in 2014 with the Dominican Summer League Yankees, posting an ERA of 3.97 in 4 games, 2 of them starts. In 2015, Severino played for the Gulf Coast Yankees, pitching to a 2.61 ERA in 11 appearances. He returned to team the following season, but struggled to a 6.29 ERA in 48 2/3 innings pitched across another 11 appearances. In 2017, Severino was moved to the bullpen and split the year between the DSL Yankees, GCL Yankees, and the rookie–level Pulaski Yankees. In 15 appearances between the three affiliates, Severino accumulated a stellar 1.59 ERA with 24 strikeouts in 22 2/3 innings of work. In 2018, Severino split the season between the Single–A Charleston RiverDogs and the High–A Tampa Tarpons, pitching to a cumulative 3.74 ERA with 39 strikeouts in 30 contests.

In 2019, Severino split the year between Tampa and the GCL Yankees, recording a 4.71 ERA with 31 strikeouts in 28 2/3 innings of work across 16 games. Severino did not play in a game in 2020 due to the cancellation of the minor league season because of the COVID-19 pandemic. He elected minor league free agency on November 2, 2020.

=== Chicago White Sox ===
On November 17, 2020, Severino signed a minor league contract with the Chicago White Sox organization. In 2021, Severino played for the Triple-A Charlotte Knights and Double-A Birmingham Barons, posting a 2.36 ERA with 53 strikeouts in 45 2/3 innings pitched across 40 appearances. The White Sox added Severino to their 40-man roster on November 4, 2021. He was assigned to Triple–A Charlotte to begin the 2022 season.

On April 12, 2022, Severino was promoted to the major leagues for the first time. He made his MLB debut on April 14, pitching in relief of José Ruiz against the Seattle Mariners. Severino got out of Ruiz's bases loaded jam by striking out Adam Frazier, the first batter he faced. In a games during his debut campaign, Severino logged a 6.14 ERA with 9 strikeouts over 7 1/3 innings pitched. On September 9, 2022, Severino was designated for assignment. He cleared waivers and was sent outright to Triple–A Charlotte the next day. He elected free agency following the season on November 10.

=== Guerreros de Oaxaca ===
On November 27, 2023, Severino signed with the Guerreros de Oaxaca of the Mexican League. In 20 games (one start) for Oaxaca in 2024, he struggled to an 0–1 record and 7.56 ERA with 27 strikeouts across 16 2/3 innings pitched. Severino was released by the Guerreros on February 11, 2025.

=== Acereros de Monclova ===
On April 16, 2025, Severino signed with the Acereros de Monclova of the Mexican League. He led the team with 43 relief appearances, posting a 3–1 record and 2.68 ERA with 46 strikeouts in 37 innings.

=== New York Mets ===
On November 25, 2025, Severino signed a minor league contract with the New York Mets. On May 19, 2026, the Mets selected Severino's contract and optioned him to the Triple-A Syracuse Mets. He made 18 total appearances for Syracuse, compiling a 2–0 record and 1.31 ERA with 20 strikeouts and five saves across 20 2/3 innings pitched. On May 30, Severino was designated for assignment by New York. He was released by the Mets on June 6, in order to pursue an opportunity in Japan.

=== Hanshin Tigers ===
On June 29, 2026, Severino signed with the Hanshin Tigers of Nippon Professional Baseball.

== See also ==
- List of Major League Baseball players from the Dominican Republic
