= Trey Amburgey =

American baseball player (born 1994)

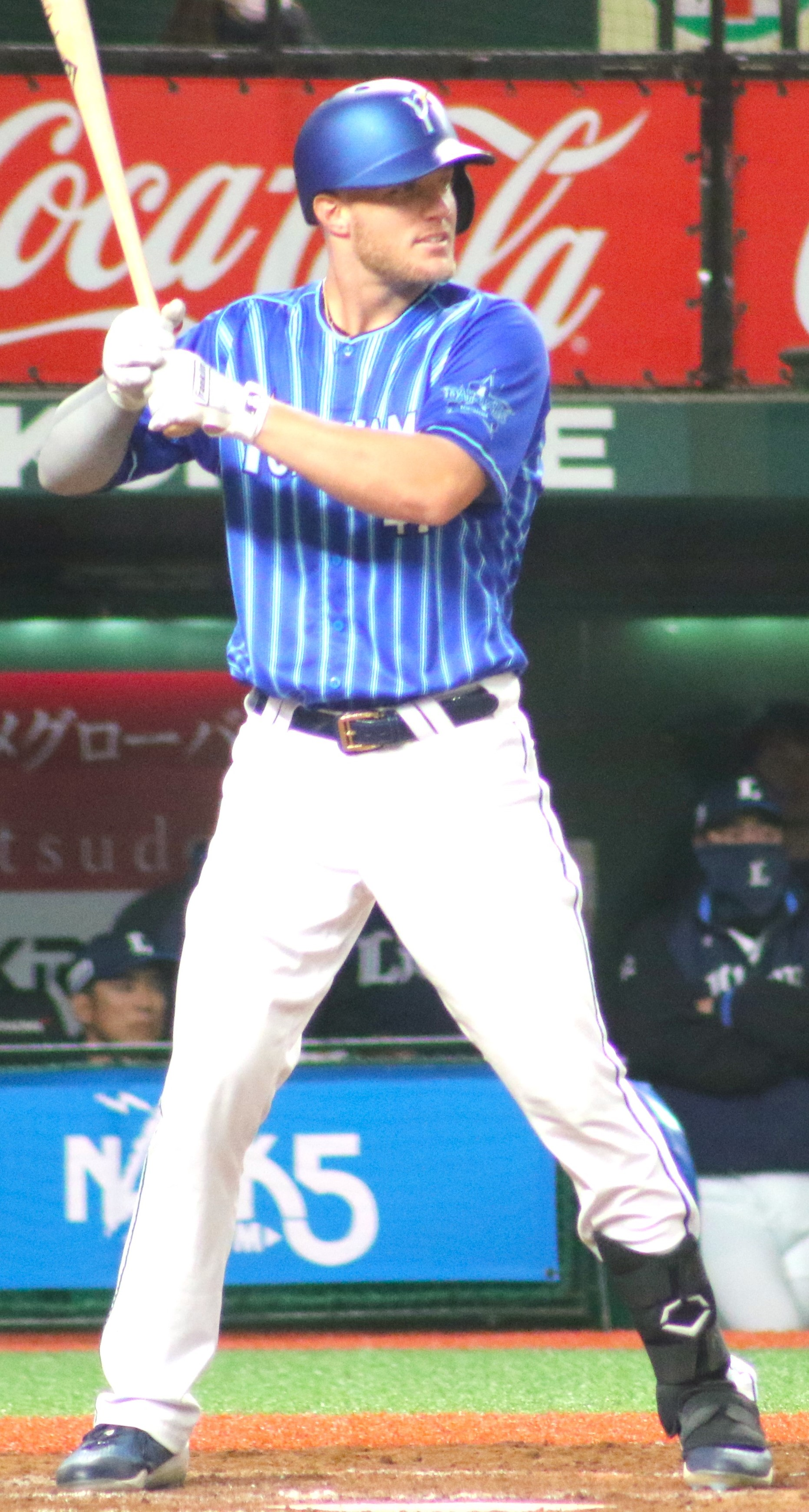
- Amburgey with the Yokohama DeNA BayStars
- Outfielder
- Born: October 24, 1994 (age 31); Lake Worth, Florida, U.S.
- Batted: Right Threw: Right

Professional debut
- MLB: July 16, 2021, for the New York Yankees
- NPB: September 5, 2023, for the Yokohama DeNA BayStars

Last appearance
- MLB: July 18, 2021, for the New York Yankees
- NPB: September 9, 2023, for the Yokohama DeNA BayStars

MLB statistics
- Batting average: .000
- Home runs: 0
- Runs batted in: 0

NPB statistics
- Batting average: .125
- Home runs: 0
- Runs batted in: 0
- Stats at Baseball Reference

Teams
- New York Yankees (2021); Yokohama DeNA BayStars (2023)

Tommy Wayne "Trey" Amburgey III (born October 24, 1994) is an American former professional baseball outfielder. He played in Major League Baseball (MLB) for the New York Yankees and in Nippon Professional Baseball (NPB) for the Yokohama DeNA BayStars.

== Early life and amateur career ==
Amburgey was born and grew up in Lake Worth, Florida and attended Park Vista Community High School. Amburgey was lightly recruited coming out of high school and played college baseball at St. Petersburg College. He had committed to continue his college baseball career at High Point University prior to being drafted.

== Professional career ==
=== New York Yankees ===
The New York Yankees selected Amburgey in the 13th round, 393rd overall, of the 2015 Major League Baseball draft. After signing with the team he was initially assigned to the Gulf Coast League Yankees, where he batted .333 with 14 stolen bases in 37 games before being promoted to the Low-A Staten Island Yankees. Amburgey split the 2016 season between the GCL Yankees, the Single-A Charleston RiverDogs, and the High-A Tampa Yankees, accumulating a .274/.313/.381 slash line in 68 games between the three teams. In 2017, Amburgey returned to Tampa and hit .236/.296/.382 with career-highs in home runs (14) and runs batted in (RBIs) (57).

Amburgey spent the 2018 season with the Double-A Trenton Thunder, batting .258/.300/.418 with 16 home runs and 74 RBIs in 125 games. He was assigned to the Triple-A Scranton/Wilkes-Barre RailRiders in 2019 and finished the season with a .274 batting average with 22 home runs, 31 doubles and an .822 OPS. Amburgey did not play in a game in 2020 due to the cancellation of the minor league season because of the COVID-19 pandemic.

He was assigned to Triple-A Scranton/Wilkes-Barre RailRiders to begin the 2021 season. On July 15, 2021, Amburgey's contract was selected to the Yankees' 40-man roster and he was promoted to the major leagues for the first time. He made his MLB debut the following day as the starting right fielder against the Boston Red Sox, going 0-for-2. On August 18, after playing in two games and not recording a hit, Amburgey was returned to the minors.

=== Cincinnati Reds ===
On December 1, 2021, Amburgey signed a minor league contract with the Cincinnati Reds. He played in 39 games for the Louisville Bats, hitting .226/.302/.429 with seven home runs and 12 RBI.

=== Seattle Mariners ===
On June 25, 2022, Amburgey was traded to the Seattle Mariners. In 20 games for the Triple–A Tacoma Rainiers, he batted .172/.232/.281 with two home runs and seven RBI. Amburgey was released by the Mariners organization on August 11.

=== Yokohama DeNA BayStars ===
On December 22, 2022, Amburgey signed with the Yokohama DeNA BayStars of Nippon Professional Baseball. He played in only 4 games for the team, collecting one hit. Following the season on November 7, 2023, the BayStars announced that Amburgey would not be given a contract for the 2024 season, and he became a free agent.

Amburgey announced his retirement from professional baseball with an Instagram post on July 17, 2024.

== Coaching career ==
Amburgey signed with Athletes Untapped as a private baseball coach on August 20, 2024.
