= Carlos Pérez (catcher, born 1996) =

Venezuelan baseball player (born 1996)

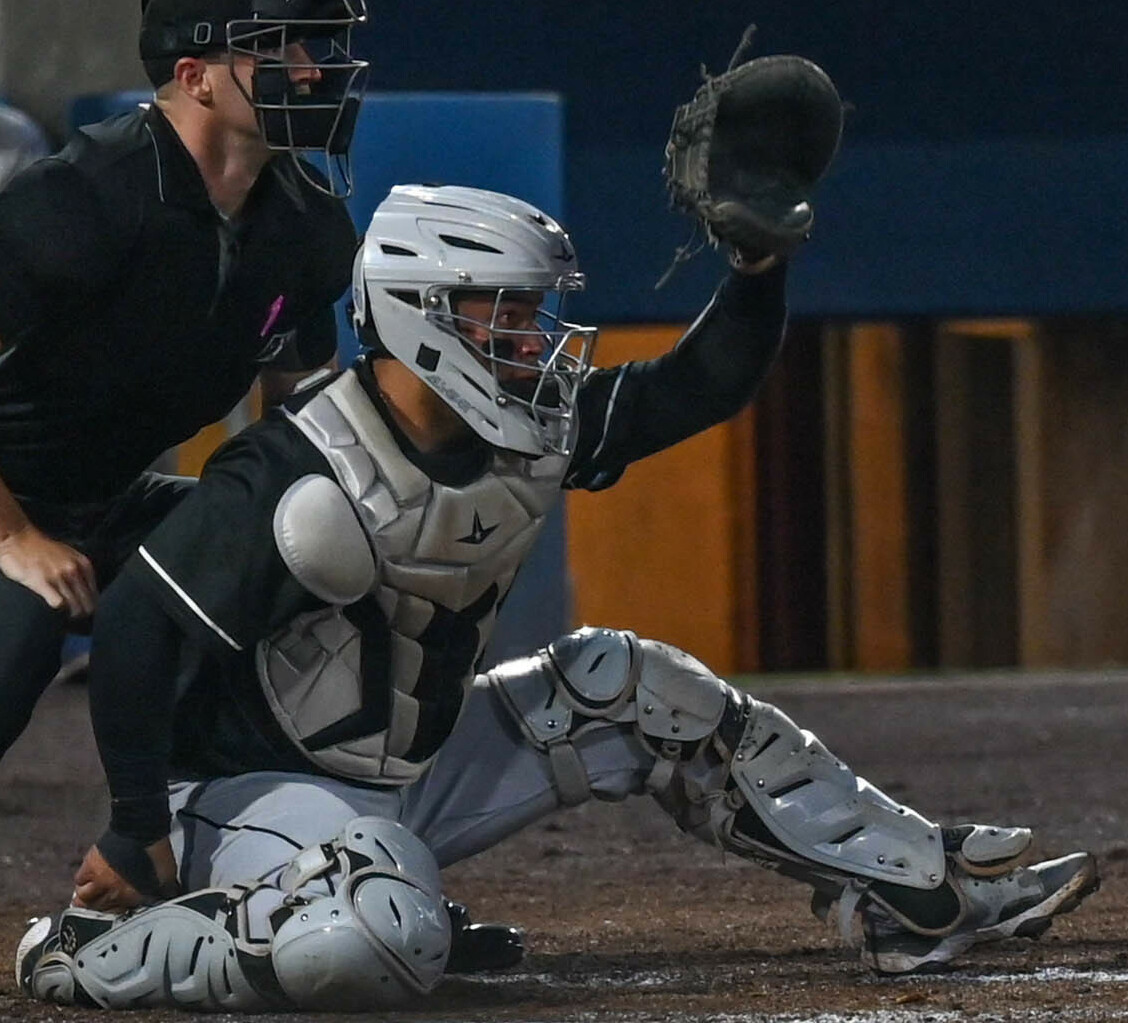
- Pérez with the Charlotte Knights in 2022

Diablos Rojos del México – No. 36
- Catcher
- Born: September 10, 1996 (age 30); Valencia, Venezuela
- Bats: Right Throws: Right

MLB debut
- August 26, 2022, for the Chicago White Sox

MLB statistics (through 2023 season)
- Batting average: .209
- Home runs: 1
- Runs batted in: 5
- Stats at Baseball Reference

Teams
- Chicago White Sox (2022–2023)

Carlos Jesús Pérez (born September 10, 1996) is a Venezuelan professional baseball catcher for the Diablos Rojos del México of the Mexican League. He played in Major League Baseball (MLB) for the Chicago White Sox in 2022 and 2023.

== Career ==
=== Chicago White Sox ===
Pérez signed with the Chicago White Sox as an international free agent in March 2014. He made his professional debut that season with the Dominican Summer League White Sox and also played with the team in 2015. Pérez spent 2016 with the Arizona League White Sox, Great Falls Voyagers and Kannapolis Intimidators. He played 2017 with Great Falls, 2018 with Kannapolis and 2019 with the Winston-Salem Dash.

Pérez did not play in a game in 2020 due to the cancellation of the minor league season because of the COVID-19 pandemic. In 2021, he played for the Birmingham Barons and Charlotte Knights. He returned to Charlotte to start 2022.

On August 21, 2022, Pérez was selected to the 40-man roster and promoted to the major leagues for the first time after Yasmani Grandal was placed on the 10-day injured list. On August 27, Pérez collected his first career hit, a single off of Arizona Diamondbacks starter Merrill Kelly.

Pérez was optioned to Triple-A Charlotte to begin the 2023 season after losing the backup catcher job to Seby Zavala. In 27 games for the White Sox, he hit .204/.264/.347 with one home run and three RBI. On December 30, he was designated for assignment by Chicago to make room on the active roster for the signing of Chris Flexen. Pérez cleared waivers and was outrighted to Triple-A on January 4, 2024. He spent the 2024 season with Charlotte, playing in 100 games and batting .273/.312/.430 with 12 home runs and 56 RBI. He elected free agency following the season on November 4.

=== Rieleros de Aguascalientes ===
On January 20, 2025, Pérez signed with the Rieleros de Aguascalientes of the Mexican Baseball League. He made 79 appearances for Aguascalientes, slashing .357/.412/.590 with 18 home runs, 71 RBI, and two stolen bases.

=== Diablos Rojos del México ===
On July 28, 2025, Pérez was traded to the Diablos Rojos del México of the Mexican League. In four appearances for the team, he went 4-for-16 (.250) with three RBI and two stolen bases. With the team, Pérez won the Serie del Rey. He returned to the Mexico City team in 2026.

== International career ==
Pérez was named to the Venezuela national baseball team for the 2024 WBSC Premier12. He was named to the All-World Team as the best first baseman.

== Personal life ==
Pérez's brother, Carlos Eduardo Pérez, also played in MLB for the Los Angeles Angels, Atlanta Braves, Texas Rangers, and Oakland Athletics.
