= Ryan Burr (baseball) =

American baseball player (born 1994)

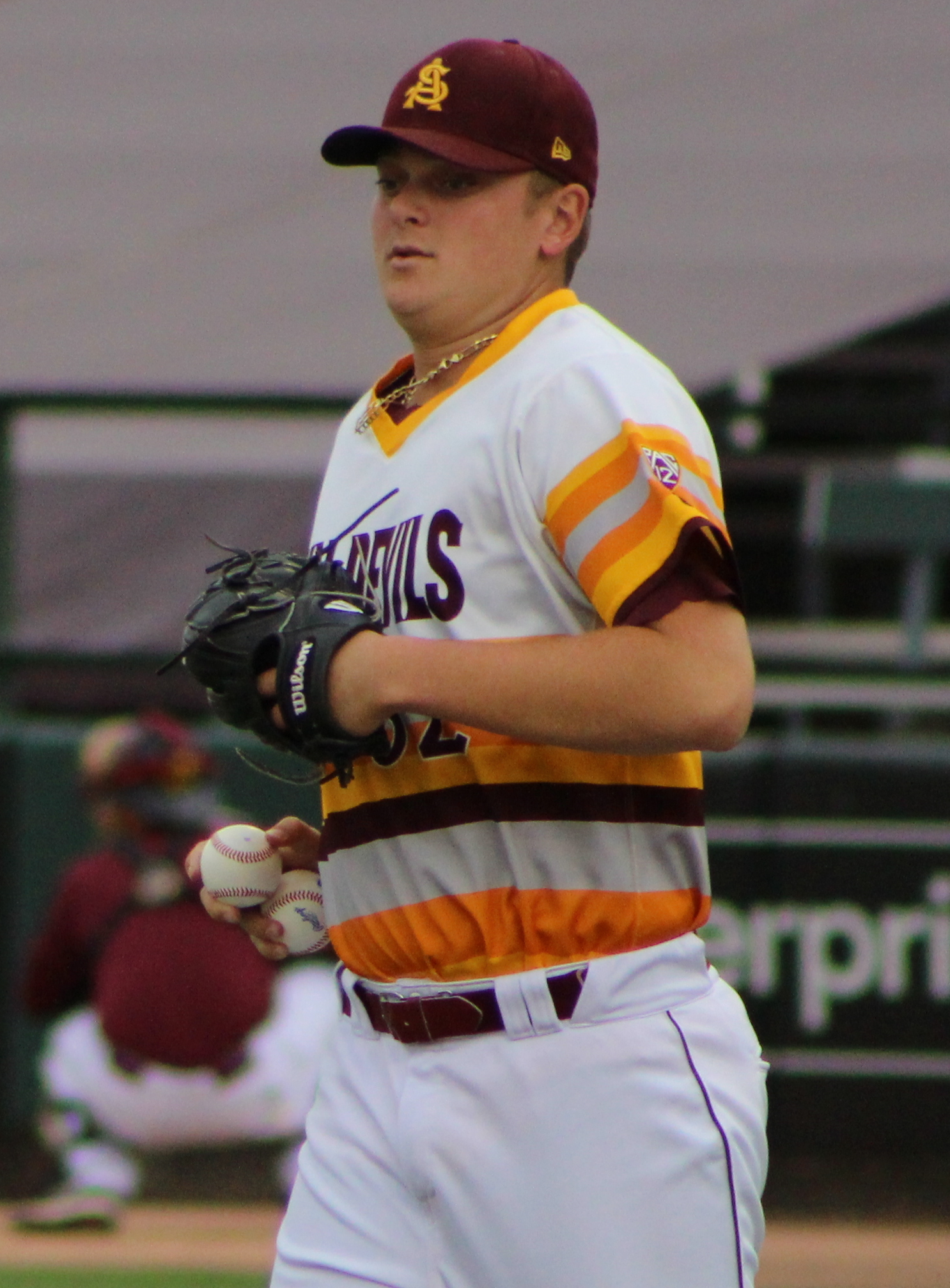
- Burr at Arizona State in 2015

Free agent
- Pitcher
- Born: May 28, 1994 (age 32); Highlands Ranch, Colorado, U.S.
- Bats: Right Throws: Right

MLB debut
- August 23, 2018, for the Chicago White Sox

MLB statistics (through 2025 season)
- Win–loss record: 5–5
- Earned run average: 4.02
- Strikeouts: 116
- Stats at Baseball Reference

Teams
- Chicago White Sox (2018–2019, 2021–2022); Toronto Blue Jays (2024–2025)

Ryan Matthew Burr (born May 28, 1994) is an American professional baseball pitcher who is a free agent. He has previously played in Major League Baseball (MLB) for the Chicago White Sox and Toronto Blue Jays.

== Amateur career ==
Burr attended Highlands Ranch High School in Highlands Ranch, Colorado. The Texas Rangers selected Burr in the 33rd round of the 2012 Major League Baseball draft. He did not sign with the Rangers and attended Arizona State University, where he played college baseball for the Arizona State Sun Devils. He finished his career with a school record 38 career saves.

== Professional career ==
=== Arizona Diamondbacks ===
After his junior year, Burr was drafted by the Arizona Diamondbacks in the fifth round of the 2015 MLB draft. He made his professional debut with the Hillsboro Hops and ended the year with the Kane County Cougars, posting a combined 4–1 record and 1.06 ERA in 34 innings pitched between both clubs. Burr returned to Kane County in 2016 and posted a 1–2 record and 3.86 ERA in only 23 innings pitched. He began 2017 with Kane County and was later promoted to the Visalia Rawhide.

=== Chicago White Sox ===
On August 11, 2017, the Chicago White Sox acquired Burr from Arizona for international signing bonus pool money. Chicago assigned him to the Winston-Salem Dash. In 65 1/3 total innings pitched between Kane County, Visalia, and Winston-Salem, Burr pitched to a 2–2 record, 1.65 ERA, and a 1.12 WHIP.

Burr began the 2018 season with the Birmingham Barons and was promoted to the Triple-A Charlotte Knights in late July, appearing in 7 games out of the bullpen and posting a 1.08 ERA over 8 1/3 innings pitched. He was promoted to the major leagues on August 22, 2018, and made his major league debut on August 24 out of the bullpen, retiring all four batters he faced and striking out two in the team's 7–2 loss to the Detroit Tigers. Burr underwent Tommy John surgery in June 2019 ending his 2019 season and causing him to miss a sizable portion of the 2020 season. Burr was non-tendered by Chicago on December 2, 2019, and became a free agent. On December 3, he re-signed with Chicago on a minor league contract. Burr did not play in a game in 2020 due to the cancellation of the minor league season because of the COVID-19 pandemic. He re-signed with Chicago on a new minor league deal on November 2, 2020.

On May 27, 2021, Burr was selected to the active roster. In 34 appearances for Chicago, he registered a 2.45 ERA with 33 strikeouts across 36 2/3 innings of work. The following year, Burr posted a 6.00 ERA across 8 appearances before the White Sox released him on June 13, 2022.

=== Tampa Bay Rays ===
On August 30, 2022, Burr signed a minor league deal with the Tampa Bay Rays organization. He spent the ensuing season with the Triple–A Durham Bulls, recording a 3.09 ERA with 23 strikeouts across 23 1/3 innings of work. Burr elected free agency following the season on November 6, 2023.

=== Philadelphia Phillies ===
On December 12, 2023, Burr signed a minor league deal with the Philadelphia Phillies. In 15 games for the Triple–A Lehigh Valley IronPigs, he logged a 2.16 ERA with 29 strikeouts across 16 2/3 innings pitched.

=== Toronto Blue Jays ===
On May 30, 2024, Burr was traded to the Toronto Blue Jays in exchange for cash considerations. The following day, Toronto selected his contract, adding him to their active roster. In 34 appearances (4 starts) for Toronto, Burr compiled an 0-2 record and 4.13 ERA with 47 strikeouts across 32 2/3 innings pitched.

Burr began the 2025 campaign on the injured list due to right shoulder fatigue. He was transferred to the 60-day injured list on April 27, 2025. Burr was activated for his season debut on July 6. He made two scoreless appearances for Toronto, recording one win and three strikeouts over two innings of work. On July 11, Burr was placed directly on the 60-day injured list due to a right rotator cuff strain. On July 18, it was announced that Burr would undergo season-ending surgery to address a capsule injury in his throwing shoulder.
