= José Ruiz (baseball) =

Venezuelan baseball player (born 1994)

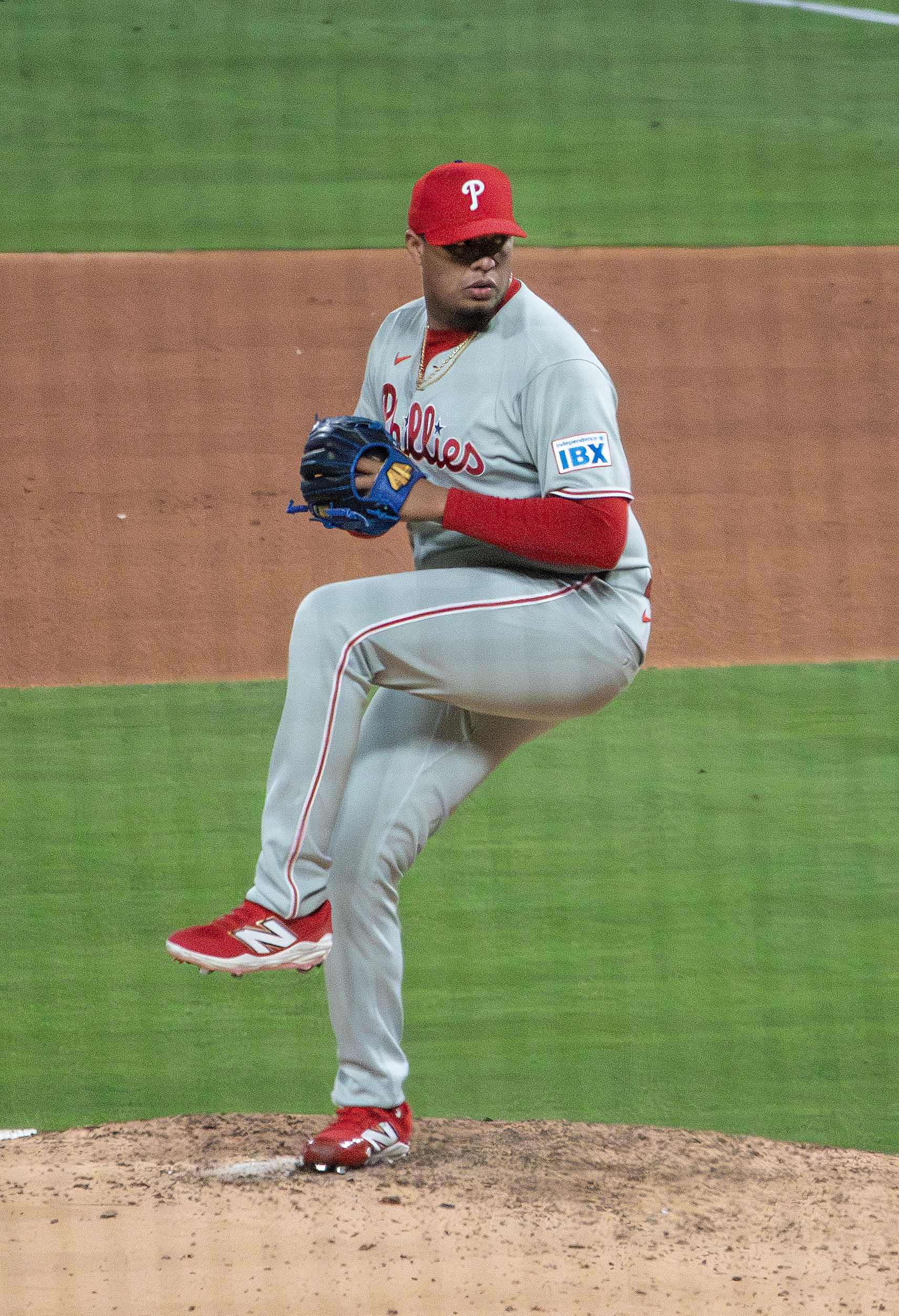
- Ruiz with the Philadelphia Phillies in 2025

Yokohama DeNA BayStars – No. 49
- Pitcher
- Born: October 21, 1994 (age 31); Guacara, Carabobo, Venezuela
- Bats: Right Throws: Right

Professional debut
- MLB: July 24, 2017, for the San Diego Padres
- NPB: March 27, 2026, for the Yokohama DeNA BayStars

MLB statistics (through 2025 season)
- Win–loss record: 11–9
- Earned run average: 4.62
- Strikeouts: 284

NPB statistics (through August 18, 2026)
- Win–loss record: 1–0
- Earned run average: 3.48
- Strikeouts: 27
- Stats at Baseball Reference

Teams
- San Diego Padres (2017); Chicago White Sox (2018–2023); Arizona Diamondbacks (2023); Philadelphia Phillies (2024–2025); Atlanta Braves (2025); Yokohama DeNA BayStars (2026–present)

José Rafael Ruiz Aparicio (born October 21, 1994) is a Venezuelan professional baseball pitcher for the Yokohama DeNA BayStars of Nippon Professional Baseball (NPB). He has previously played in Major League Baseball (MLB) for the San Diego Padres, Chicago White Sox, Arizona Diamondbacks, Philadelphia Phillies, and Atlanta Braves. He made his MLB debut in 2017.

== Career ==
=== San Diego Padres ===
Ruiz signed with the San Diego Padres as an international free agent on July 2, 2011. He started his career as a catcher, and made his professional debut in 2012 with the Dominican Summer League Padres, hitting .177 in 55 games. Ruiz played 2013 with the rookie–level Arizona League Padres, batting .224/.257/.318 with no home runs and 16 RBI.

He spent the 2014 campaign with the Low–A Eugene Emeralds, hitting .187/.201/.232 with seven RBI across 43 games. In 2015, Ruiz played in 90 games for the Single–A Fort Wayne TinCaps, slashing .214/.269/.248 with no home runs and 24 RBI.

Ruiz began the 2016 season with the High–A Lake Elsinore Storm, and worked to a .215/.245/.266 batting line with nine RBI. He was converted into a pitcher midway through the season. He made 11 scoreless appearances split between the AZL Padres, Low–A Tri-City Dust Devils, and Lake Elsinore. On November 18, 2016, the Padres added Ruiz to their 40-man roster to protect him from the Rule 5 draft.

Ruiz started 2017 with the Lake Elsinore Storm and was called up to the Padres on July 24. In his major league debut, Ruiz pitched a scoreless inning, striking out one and walking one. He struck out Yoenis Céspedes for his first strikeout. Ruiz was sent back down to Lake Elsinore the following day. On December 15, 2017, Ruiz was designated for assignment by the Padres.

=== Chicago White Sox ===
He was claimed off waivers by the Chicago White Sox on December 22, 2017. He began 2018 with the Winston-Salem Dash. On September 4, 2018, he was called up to the major leagues. He made 6 appearances for the White Sox in 2018 with a 4.15 ERA. In 2019, he had a 5.63 ERA across 40 games for the White Sox.

With the 2020 Chicago White Sox, Ruiz appeared in five games, compiling a 0–0 record with 2.25 ERA and five strikeouts in four innings pitched. In 2021, Ruiz had a 1–3 record and an ERA of 3.05 in 59 games while pitching in 65 innings and striking out 63 batters. In 2022, Ruiz had a 4.60 ERA in 63 appearances with the White Sox.

On January 13, 2023, Ruiz agreed to a one-year, $925,000 contract with the White Sox, avoiding salary arbitration. He struggled to start the season, allowing nine earned runs in 3 2/3 innings pitched, for a 22.09 ERA. Ruiz was designated for assignment on April 7.

=== Arizona Diamondbacks ===
On April 9, 2023, the White Sox traded Ruiz to the Arizona Diamondbacks in exchange for cash considerations. In 34 appearances for the Diamondbacks, he registered a 4.43 ERA with 36 strikeouts in 40 2/3 innings pitched. On July 25, Ruiz was designated for assignment by Arizona. He cleared waivers and was sent outright to the Triple–A Reno Aces on July 30. Following the season, Ruiz elected free agency on November 2.

=== Philadelphia Phillies ===
On November 28, 2023, Ruiz signed a minor league contract with the Philadelphia Phillies that included an invitation to spring training. He began the year with the Triple–A Lehigh Valley IronPigs, logging a 1.64 ERA with 13 strikeouts and 3 saves across 10 appearances. On May 3, 2024, the Phillies selected Ruiz's contract, adding him to the major league roster. He made 52 appearances for Philadelphia over the course of the regular season, compiling a 5-1 record and 3.71 ERA with 52 strikeouts and one save across 51 innings.

In November 2024, Ruiz and the Phillies agreed to a contract worth $1.2 million. He made 16 appearances for Philadelphia in 2025, but struggled to an 8.16 ERA with 12 strikeouts across 14 1/3 innings pitched. Ruiz was designated for assignment by the Phillies on June 1, 2025.

=== Atlanta Braves ===
On June 7, 2025, Ruiz was claimed off waivers by the Atlanta Braves. He made two appearances for Atlanta, allowing three earned runs with three strikeouts over two innings of work. On June 20, Ruiz was designated for assignment. He cleared waivers and was sent outright to the Triple-A Gwinnett Stripers on June 22.

=== Texas Rangers ===
On July 17, 2025, Ruiz was traded to the Texas Rangers, alongside cash considerations, in exchange for Dane Dunning. In 20 appearances for the Triple-A Round Rock Express, he posted a 1-0 record and 2.31 ERA with 24 strikeouts and seven saves across 23 1/3 innings pitched. Ruiz elected free agency on September 29.

=== Yokohama DeNA BayStars ===
On December 3, 2025, Ruiz signed a one-year, $1.2 million contract with the Yokohama DeNA BayStars of Nippon Professional Baseball.
