= List of Washington Nationals first-round draft picks =

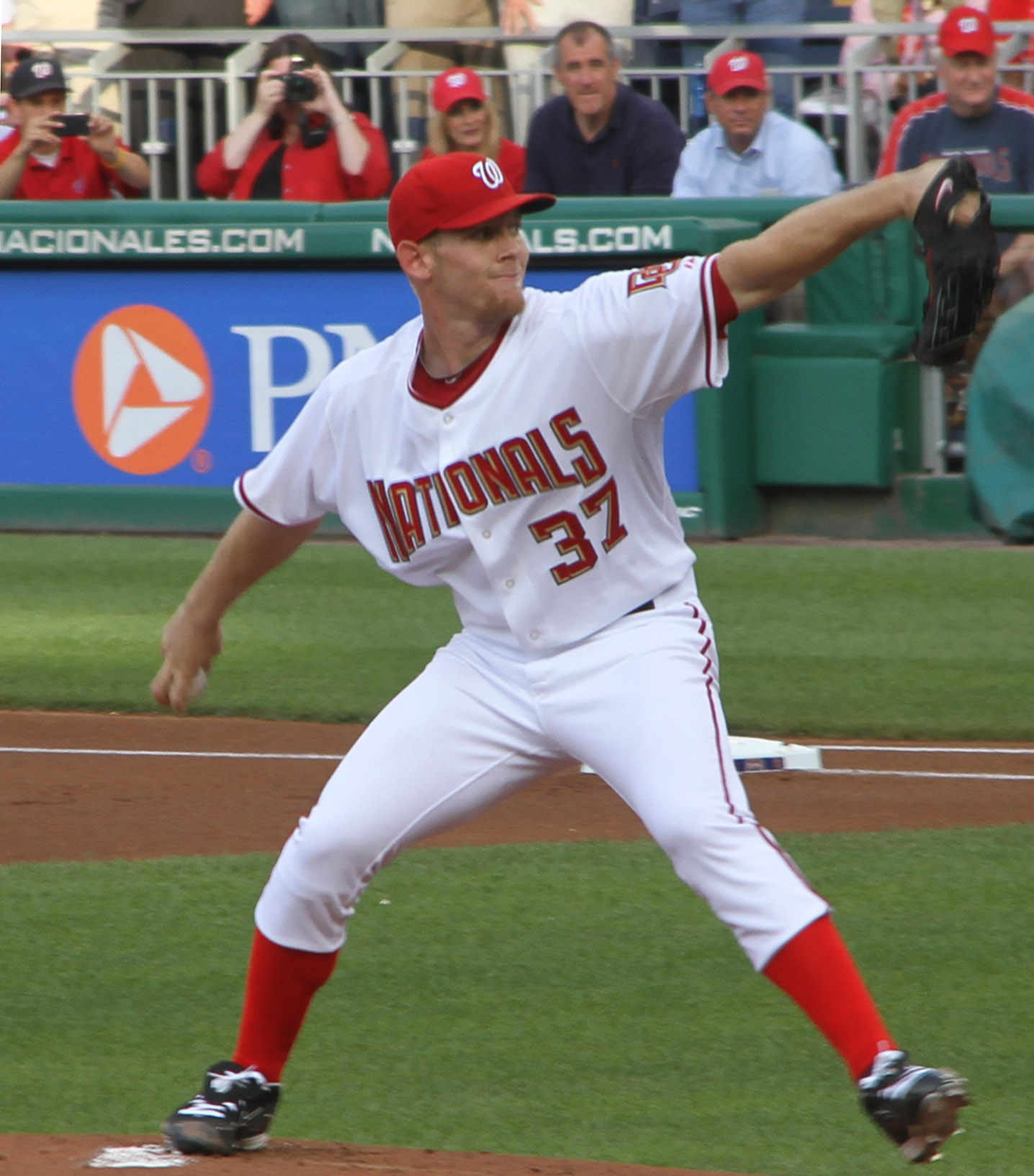
Stephen Strasburg (2009) is considered to be one of the greatest pitching prospects in the history of the draft, and won the 2019 World Series MVP with the Nationals.

The Washington Nationals are a Major League Baseball (MLB) franchise based in Washington, D.C. Prior to 2005, they were known as the Montreal Expos and based in Montreal, Quebec, Canada. The Nationals play in the National League East division. Since the institution of MLB's Rule 4 Draft, the Expos/Nationals have selected 73 players in the first round. Officially known as the "First-Year Player Draft", the Rule 4 Draft is MLB's primary mechanism for assigning amateur baseball players from high schools, colleges, and other amateur baseball clubs to its teams. The draft order is determined based on the previous season's standings, with the team possessing the worst record receiving the first pick. In addition, teams which lost free agents in the previous off-season may be awarded compensatory or supplementary picks. The First-Year Player Draft is unrelated to the 1968 expansion draft in which the Expos initially filled their roster.

Of the 73 players picked in the first round by Montreal or Washington, 38 have been pitchers, the most of any position; 27 of them were right-handed, while 11 were left-handed. Thirteen outfielders, ten shortstops, five third basemen, four catchers, and three first basemen were also taken. The team has never drafted a player at second base. In all, 40 of the players were drafted from high school, 27 from four-year colleges, and four from junior colleges. Eleven of the players came from high schools, universities, or junior colleges in the state of California, and Florida follows with 10 players. They have also drafted two players from Puerto Rico: Josue Estrada (1993) and Hiram Bocachica (1994).

No pick has been elected to the Hall of Fame. One first-round pick, Bryce Harper (2010), has been named Rookie of the Year and Most Valuable Player in his career, earning National League rookie honors in 2012 and National League MVP honors in 2015, both with the Nationals. Harper is the second of the Nationals' two overall #1 selections; the first was Stephen Strasburg in 2009. Condredge Holloway (1971) was drafted as a shortstop, but ended up becoming a quarterback in the Canadian Football League, and was inducted into the Canadian Football Hall of Fame in 1999.

The Expos/Nationals have made 19 selections in the supplemental round of the draft and six compensatory picks since their entry into the league in 1969. These additional picks are provided when a team loses a particularly valuable free agent in the previous off-season,^{[V]} or, more recently, if a team fails to sign a draft pick from the previous year. The Expos/Nationals have failed to sign four of their first-round picks: Condredge Holloway (1971), Charles Johnson (1989), John Patterson (1996), and Aaron Crow (2008). The Expos received no compensation for failing to sign Holloway, but received the 40th pick in 1990, the 52nd pick in 1997, and the 10th pick in 2009 for failing to sign Johnson, Patterson, and Crow, respectively.

== Key ==
Year	Each year links to an article about that year's Major League Baseball draft.
Position	Indicates the secondary/collegiate position at which the player was drafted, rather than the professional position the player may have gone on to play
Pick	Indicates the number of the pick
*	Player did not sign with the Expos/Nationals
§	Indicates a supplemental pick
'19	Player was a member of the Nationals' 2019 championship team

== Picks ==
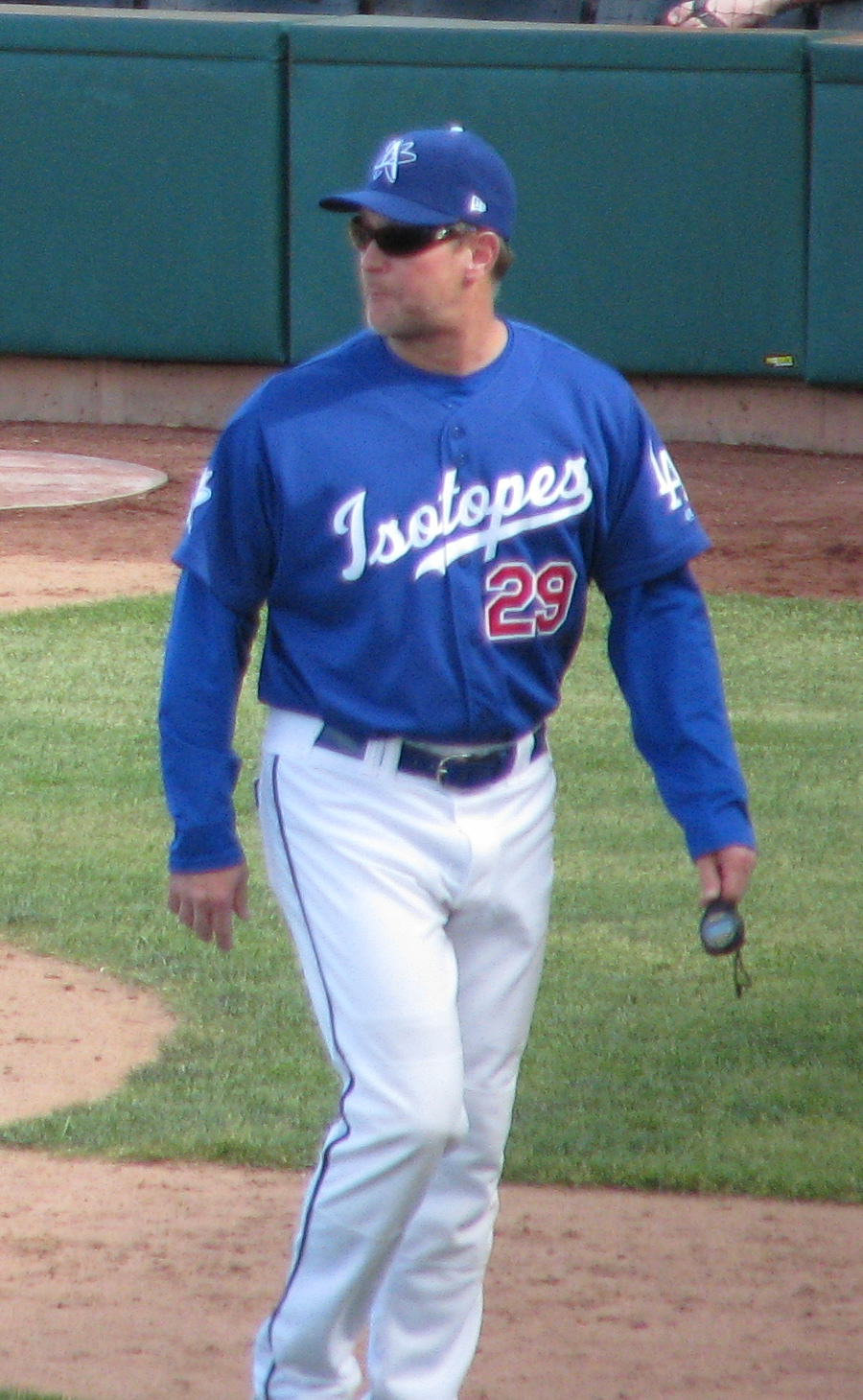
Tim Wallach (1979) was one of two players drafted by the Expos/Nationals from California State University, Fullerton.

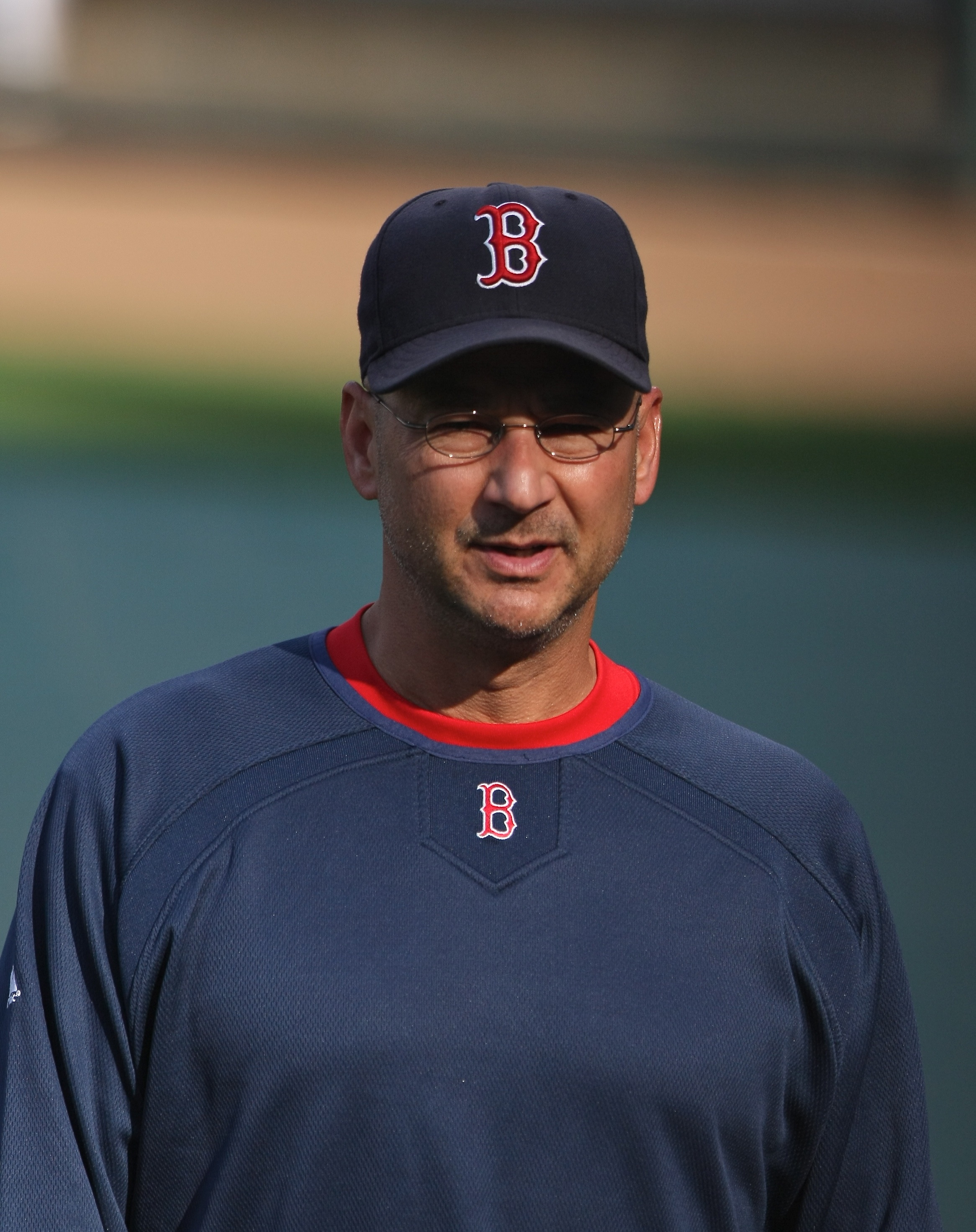
Terry Francona (1980) was the Expos/Nationals' first compensatory first-round draft selection.

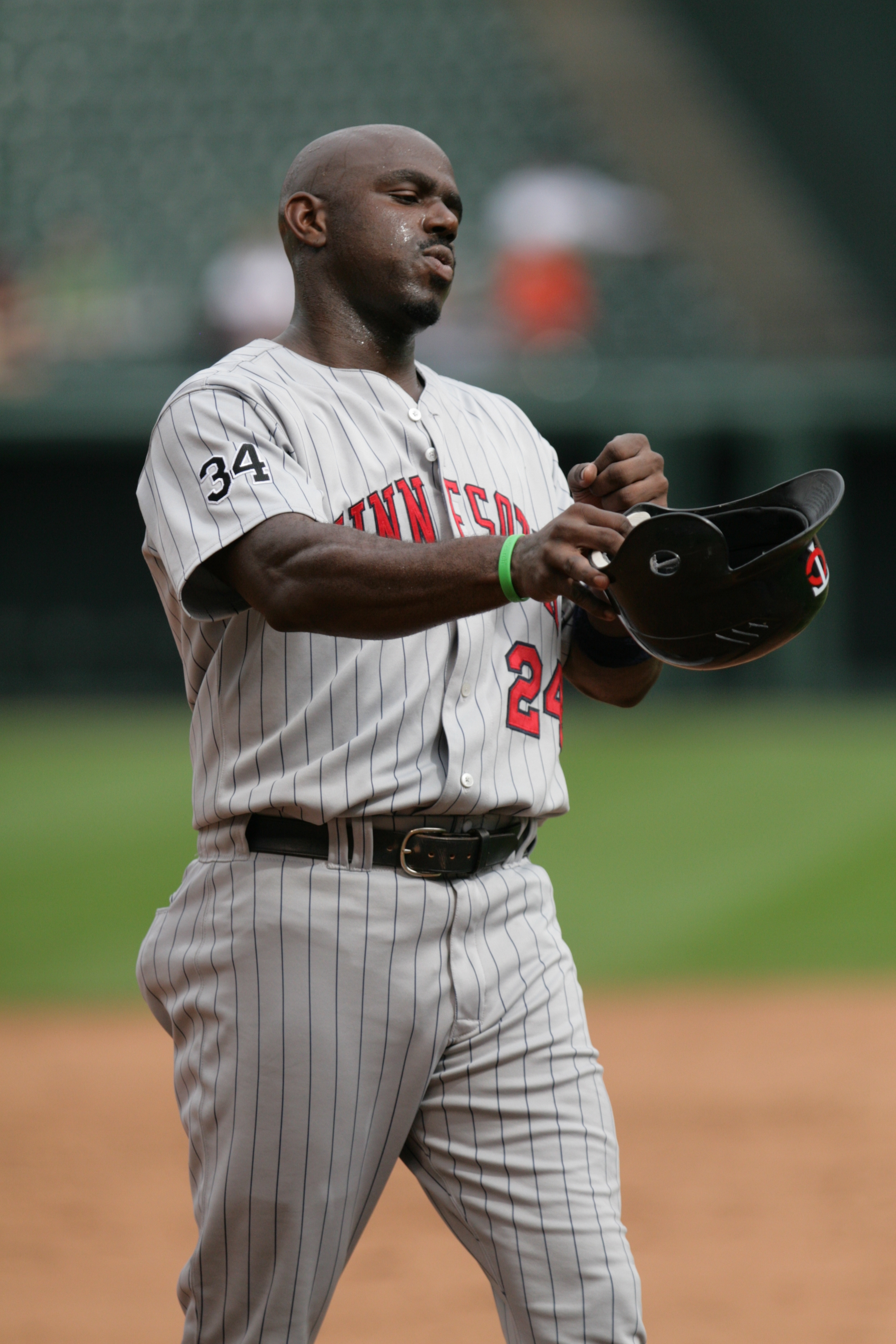
Rondell White (1990) was one of six players drafted by the Expos in the first round in 1990.

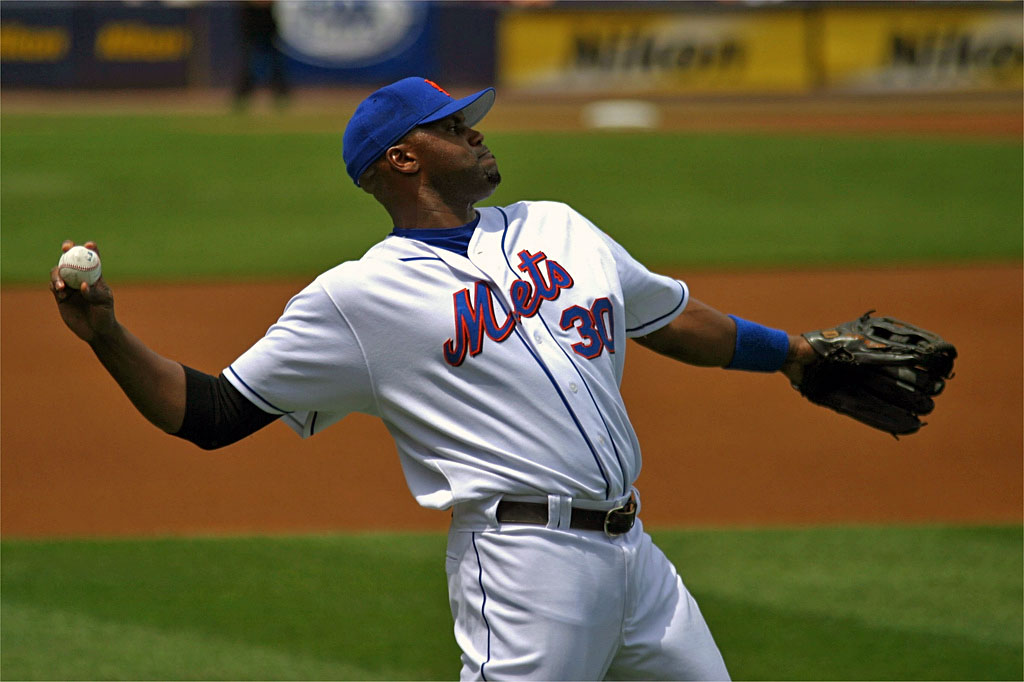
Cliff Floyd (1991) was one of three first basemen drafted by the Expos/Nationals.

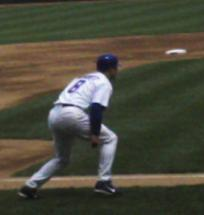
Michael Barrett (1995) was drafted as a shortstop, but spent most of his professional career as a catcher.

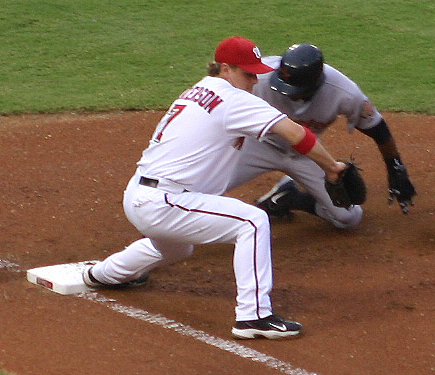
Brad Wilkerson (1998) was one of eight players drafted by the Expos/Nationals from the state of Florida.

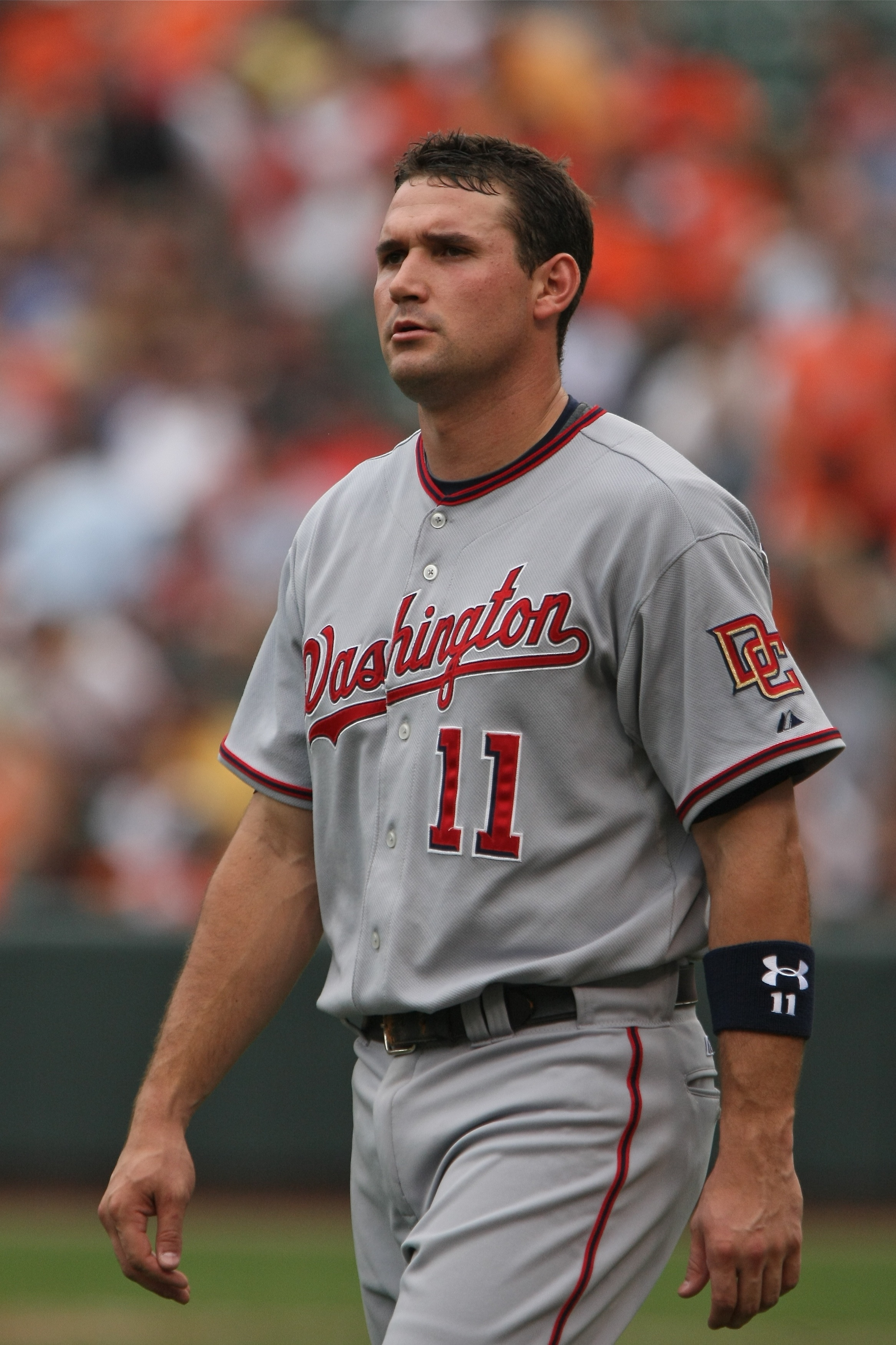
Ryan Zimmerman (2005) was one of eleven players the Expos/Nationals selected with a top five draft pick.

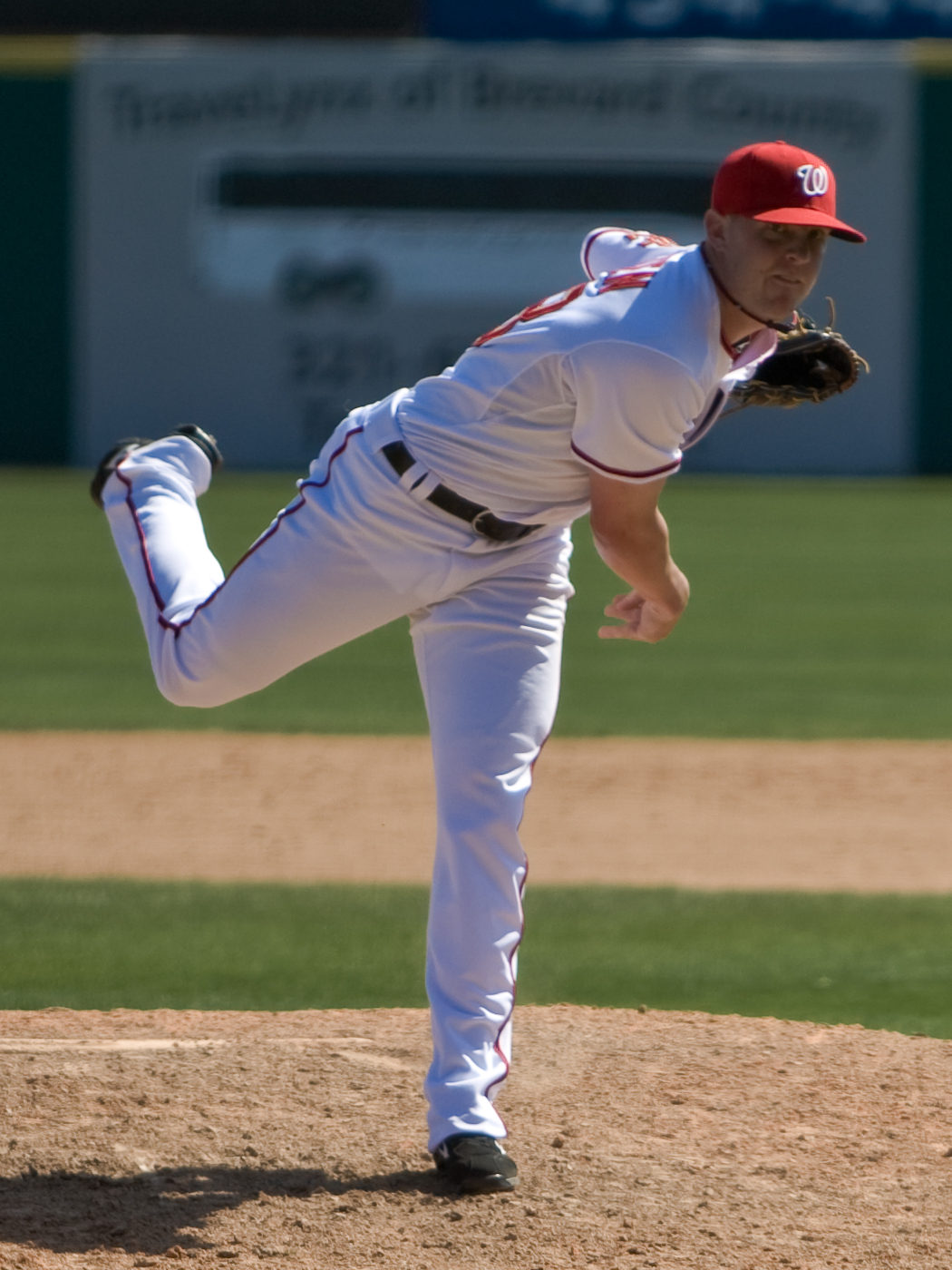
Drew Storen (2009) was one of three players drafted by the Expos/Nationals from Stanford University.

Year	Name	Position	School (location)	Pick	Ref
1968	no first-round pick^{[a]}				
1969	Balor Moore	Left-handed pitcher	Deer Park High School (Deer Park, Texas)	22	
1970	Barry Foote	Catcher	Smithfield-Selma High School (Selma, North Carolina)	3	
1971	Condredge Holloway*	Shortstop	Lee High School (Huntsville, Alabama)	4	
1972	Bobby Goodman	Catcher	Bishop Byrne High School (Memphis, Tennessee)	5	
1973	Gary Roenicke	Shortstop	Edgewood High School (West Covina, California)	8	
1974	Ron Sorey	Third baseman	Stebbins High School (Dayton, Ohio)	9	
1975	Art Miles	Shortstop	Crockett High School (Austin, Texas)	10	
1976	Bob James	Right-handed pitcher	Verdugo Hills High School (Sunland, California)	9	
1977	Bill Gullickson	Right-handed pitcher	Joliet Catholic Academy (Joliet, Illinois)	2	
1978	Glenn Franklin	Shortstop	Chipola Junior College (Marianna, Florida)	9	
1979	Tim Wallach	First baseman	California State University, Fullerton (Fullerton, California)	10	
1980	Terry Francona	Outfielder	University of Arizona (Tucson, Arizona)	22^{[b]}	
1981	Darren Dilks	Left-handed pitcher	Oklahoma State University–Stillwater (Stillwater, Oklahoma)	18	
1982	no first-round pick^{[c]}				
1983	Rich Stoll	Right-handed pitcher	University of Michigan (Ann Arbor, Michigan)	14	
1983	Brian Holman	Right-handed pitcher	Wichita North High School (Wichita, Kansas)	16^{[d]}	
1984	Bob Caffrey	Catcher	California State University, Fullerton (Fullerton, California)	13	
1984	Norm Charlton	Left-handed pitcher	Rice University (Houston, Texas)	28§^{[e]}	
1985	Pete Incaviglia	Third baseman	Oklahoma State University–Stillwater (Stillwater, Oklahoma)	8	
1986	Kevin Dean	Outfielder	Hogan High School (Vallejo, California)	15	
1987	Delino DeShields	Shortstop	Seaford Senior High School (Seaford, Delaware)	12	
1987	Tyrone Kingwood	Outfielder	Imperial Valley College (Imperial, California)	28§^{[f]}	
1988	Dave Wainhouse	Right-handed pitcher	Washington State University (Pullman, Washington)	19	
1989	Charles Johnson*	Catcher	Fort Pierce Westwood High School (Fort Pierce, Florida)	10	
1990	Shane Andrews	Third baseman	Carlsbad High School (Carlsbad, New Mexico)	11	
1990	Rondell White	Outfielder	Jones County High School (Gray, Georgia)	24^{[g]}	
1990	Gabe White	Left-handed pitcher	Sebring High School (Sebring, Florida)	28§^{[h]}	
1990	Stan Spencer	Right-handed pitcher	Stanford University (Stanford, California)	35§^{[i]}	
1990	Ben Van Ryn	Left-handed pitcher	East Noble High School (Kendallville, Indiana)	37§^{[j]}	
1990	Stan Robertson	Outfielder	Plainview High School (Plainview, Texas)	40§^{[k]}	
1991	Cliff Floyd	First baseman	Thornwood High School (South Holland, Illinois)	14	
1992	B. J. Wallace	Left-handed pitcher	Mississippi State University (Mississippi State, Mississippi)	3	
1993	Chris Schwab	Outfielder	Cretin High School (St. Paul, Minnesota)	18	
1993	Josue Estrada	Outfielder	Medardo Carazo High School (Trujillo Alto, Puerto Rico)	31§^{[l]}	
1994	Hiram Bocachica	Shortstop	Rexville High School (Bayamon, Puerto Rico)	21	
1994	Mike Thurman	Right-handed pitcher	Oregon State University (Corvallis, Oregon)	31§^{[m]}	
1995	Michael Barrett	Shortstop	Pace Academy (Atlanta, Georgia)	28	
1996	John Patterson*	Right-handed pitcher	West Orange-Stark High School (West Orange, Texas)	5	
1997	Donnie Bridges	Right-handed pitcher	Oak Grove High School (Hattiesburg, Mississippi)	23	
1997	Chris Stowe	Right-handed pitcher	Chancellor High School (Fredericksburg, Virginia)	37§^{[n]}	
1997	Scott Hodges	Shortstop	Henry Clay High School (Lexington, Kentucky)	38§^{[o]}	
1997	Bryan Hebson	Right-handed pitcher	Auburn University (Auburn, Alabama)	44§^{[p]}	
1997	Thomas Pittman	First baseman	East St. John High School (Garyville, Louisiana)	45§^{[q]}	
1997	T. J. Tucker	Right-handed pitcher	River Ridge High School (New Port Richey, Florida)	47§^{[r]}	
1997	Shane Arthurs	Right-handed pitcher	Westmoore High School (Oklahoma City, Oklahoma)	48§^{[s]}	
1997	Tootie Myers	Outfielder	Petal High School (Petal, Mississippi)	52§^{[t]}	
1998	Josh McKinley	Shortstop	Malvern Preparatory School (Malvern, Pennsylvania)	11	
1998	Brad Wilkerson	Outfielder	University of Florida (Gainesville, Florida)	33§^{[u]}	
1999	Josh Girdley	Left-handed pitcher	Jasper High School (Jasper, Texas)	6	
2000	Justin Wayne	Right-handed pitcher	Stanford University (Stanford, California)	5	
2001	Josh Karp	Right-handed pitcher	University of California, Los Angeles (Los Angeles, California)	6	
2002	Clint Everts	Right-handed pitcher	Cypress Falls High School (Houston, Texas)	5	
2003	Chad Cordero	Right-handed pitcher	California State University, Fullerton (Fullerton, California)	20	
2004	Bill Bray	Left-handed pitcher	College of William & Mary (Williamsburg, Virginia)	13	
2005	Ryan Zimmerman '19	Third baseman	University of Virginia (Charlottesville, Virginia)	4	
2006	Chris Marrero	Outfielder	Monsignor Edward Pace High School (Miami Gardens, Florida)	15	
2006	Colton Willems	Right-handed pitcher	John Carroll Catholic High School (Fort Pierce, Florida)	22^{[v]}	
2007	Ross Detwiler	Left-handed pitcher	Missouri State University (Springfield, Missouri)	6	
2007	Josh Smoker	Left-handed pitcher	Calhoun High School (Calhoun, Georgia)	31§^{[w]}	
2007	Michael Burgess	Outfielder	Hillsborough High School (Tampa, Florida)	49§^{[x]}	
2008	Aaron Crow*	Right-handed pitcher	University of Missouri (Columbia, Missouri)	9	
2009	Stephen Strasburg '19	Right-handed pitcher	San Diego State University (San Diego, California)	1	
2009	Drew Storen	Right-handed pitcher	Stanford University (Stanford, California)	10§^{[y]}	
2010	Bryce Harper	Outfielder	College of Southern Nevada (Henderson, Nevada)	1	
2011	Anthony Rendon '19	Third baseman	Rice University (Houston, Texas)	6	
2011	Alex Meyer	Right-handed pitcher	University of Kentucky (Lexington, Kentucky)	23^{[z]}	
2011	Brian Goodwin	Outfielder	Miami Dade College (Miami, Florida)	34§^{[aa]}	
2012	Lucas Giolito	Right-handed pitcher	Harvard-Westlake High School (Los Angeles, California)	16	
2013	no first-round pick				
2014	Erick Fedde '19	Right-handed pitcher	University of Nevada, Las Vegas (Las Vegas, Nevada)	18	
2015	no first-round pick				
2016	Carter Kieboom '19	Shortstop	Walton High School (Marietta, Georgia)	28	
2016	Dane Dunning	Right-handed pitcher	University of Florida (Gainesville, Florida)	34§^{[ab]}	
2017	Seth Romero	Left-handed pitcher	University of Houston (Houston, Texas)	25	
2018	Mason Denaburg	Right-handed pitcher	Merritt Island High School (Merritt Island, Florida)	27	
2019	Jackson Rutledge	Right-handed pitcher	San Jacinto College (Houston, Texas)	17	
2020	Cade Cavalli	Right-handed pitcher	University of Oklahoma (Norman, Oklahoma)	22	
2021	Brady House	Shortstop	Winder-Barrow High School (Winder, Georgia)	11	
2022	Elijah Green	Outfielder	IMG Academy (Bradenton, Florida)	5	
2023	Dylan Crews	Outfielder	LSU (Baton Rouge, Louisiana)	2	
2024	Seaver King	Shortstop	Wake Forest University (Winston-Salem, North Carolina)	10	
2025	Eli Willits	Shortstop	Fort Cobb-Broxton High School (Fort Cobb, Oklahoma)	1	
2026	Chris Hacopian	Second baseman	Texas A&M University (College Station, Texas)	11	

== See also ==
- Washington Nationals minor league players

== Footnotes ==
- ^{V} Through the 2012 draft, free agents were evaluated by the Elias Sports Bureau and rated "Type A", "Type B", or not compensation-eligible. If a team offered arbitration to a player but that player refused and subsequently signed with another team, the original team was able to receive additional draft picks. If a "Type A" free agent left in this way, his previous team received a supplemental pick and a compensatory pick from the team with which he signed. If a "Type B" free agent left in this way, his previous team received only a supplemental pick. Since the 2013 draft, free agents are no longer classified by type; instead, compensatory picks are only awarded if the team offered its free agent a contract worth at least the average of the 125 current richest MLB contracts. However, if the free agent's last team acquired the player in a trade during the last year of his contract, it is ineligible to receive compensatory picks for that player.
- ^{a} The Expos and other expansion teams (Seattle Pilots, Kansas City Royals, and San Diego Padres) did not receive first-round picks in 1968. They began the selection process at the end of the fourth round of the regular phase.
- ^{b} The Expos gained a compensatory first-round pick in 1980 from the New York Yankees for losing free agent Rudy May.
- ^{c} The Expos lost their first-round pick in 1982 to the Chicago Cubs as compensation for signing free agent Tim Blackwell.
- ^{d} The Expos gained a compensatory first-round pick in 1983 from the San Francisco Giants for losing free agent Joel Youngblood.
- ^{e} The Expos gained a supplemental first-round pick in 1984 for losing free agent Manny Trillo.
- ^{f} The Expos gained a supplemental first-round pick in 1987 for losing free agent Andre Dawson.
- ^{g} The Expos gained a compensatory first-round pick in 1990 from the California Angels for losing free agent Mark Langston.
- ^{h} The Expos gained a supplemental first-round pick in 1990 for losing free agent Mark Langston.
- ^{i} The Expos gained a supplemental first-round pick in 1990 for losing free agent Hubie Brooks.
- ^{j} The Expos gained a supplemental first-round pick in 1990 for losing free agent Pascual Perez.
- ^{k} The Expos gained a supplemental first-round pick in 1990 for failing to sign draft pick Charles Johnson.
- ^{l} The Expos gained a supplemental first-round pick in 1993 for losing free agent Spike Owen.
- ^{m} The Expos gained a supplemental first-round pick in 1994 for losing free agent Dennis Martínez.
- ^{n} The Expos gained a supplemental first-round pick in 1997 for losing free agent Mel Rojas.
- ^{o} The Expos gained a supplemental first-round pick in 1997 for losing free agent Moisés Alou.
- ^{p} The Expos gained a supplemental first-round pick in 1997 for losing free agent Mel Rojas.
- ^{q} The Expos gained a supplemental first-round pick in 1997 for losing free agent Moisés Alou.
- ^{r} The Expos gained a supplemental first-round pick in 1997 for losing free agent Mel Rojas.
- ^{s} The Expos gained a supplemental first-round pick in 1997 for losing free agent Moisés Alou.
- ^{t} The Expos gained a supplemental first-round pick in 1997 for failing to sign draft pick John Patterson.
- ^{u} The Expos gained a supplemental first-round pick in 1998 for losing free agent Darrin Fletcher.
- ^{v} The Nationals gained a compensatory first-round pick in 2006 from the Oakland Athletics for losing free agent Esteban Loaiza.
- ^{w} The Nationals gained a supplemental first-round pick in 2007 for losing free agent Alfonso Soriano.
- ^{x} The Nationals gained a supplemental first-round pick in 2007 for losing free agent José Guillén.
- ^{y} The Nationals gained a supplemental first-round pick in 2009 for failing to sign draft pick Aaron Crow.
- ^{z} The Nationals gained a compensatory first-round pick in 2011 from the Chicago White Sox for losing free agent Adam Dunn.
- ^{aa} The Nationals gained a supplemental first-round pick in 2011 for losing free agent Adam Dunn.
- ^{ab} The Nationals gained a supplemental first-round pick in 2016 for losing free agent Jordan Zimmerman.
