= 2018 Major League Baseball draft =

Major League Baseball draft

General information
- Date: June 4–6, 2018
- Location: Secaucus, New Jersey
- Network: MLB Network

Overview
- 1,214 total selections
- First selection: Casey Mize; Detroit Tigers
- First round selections: 43

The 2018 Major League Baseball draft began on June 4, 2018. The draft assigned amateur baseball players to MLB teams. The draft order was determined based on the reverse order of the 2017 MLB season final standings. In addition, compensation picks were distributed for players who did not sign from the 2017 MLB draft and for teams who lost qualifying free agents. The first 43 picks, including the first round and compensatory picks, were broadcast by MLB Network on June 4. The remainder of the draft was streamed on MLB.com on June 5 and 6.

With a tie for the worst record in the 2017 MLB season at 64–98, the Detroit Tigers received the first overall pick ahead of the San Francisco Giants via a tiebreaker. The Detroit Tigers selected Casey Mize with the first overall pick in the draft. There were a total of 40 rounds in the draft, with 1,214 players selected.

On September 9, 2019, the Chicago Cubs promoted Nico Hoerner to the big leagues, making him the first player to reach MLB in this draft.

== First round selections ==
Key
	All-Star
*	Player did not sign

Pick	Player	Team	Position	School
1	Casey Mize	Detroit Tigers	Pitcher	Auburn
2	Joey Bart	San Francisco Giants	Catcher	Georgia Tech
3	Alec Bohm	Philadelphia Phillies	Third baseman	Wichita State
4	Nick Madrigal	Chicago White Sox	Shortstop	Oregon State
5	Jonathan India	Cincinnati Reds	Third baseman	Florida
6	Jarred Kelenic	New York Mets	Outfielder	Waukesha West High School (WI)
7	Ryan Weathers	San Diego Padres	Pitcher	Loretto High School (TN)
8	Carter Stewart*	Atlanta Braves	Pitcher	Eau Gallie High School (FL)
9	Kyler Murray	Oakland Athletics	Outfielder	Oklahoma
10	Travis Swaggerty	Pittsburgh Pirates	Outfielder	South Alabama
11	Grayson Rodriguez	Baltimore Orioles	Pitcher	Central Heights High School (TX)
12	Jordan Groshans	Toronto Blue Jays	Shortstop	Magnolia High School (TX)
13	Connor Scott	Miami Marlins	Outfielder	Plant High School (FL)
14	Logan Gilbert	Seattle Mariners	Pitcher	Stetson
15	Cole Winn	Texas Rangers	Pitcher	Orange Lutheran High School (CA)
16	Matthew Liberatore	Tampa Bay Rays	Pitcher	Mountain Ridge High School (AZ)
17	Jordyn Adams	Los Angeles Angels	Outfielder	Green Hope High School (NC)
18	Brady Singer	Kansas City Royals	Pitcher	Florida
19	Nolan Gorman	St. Louis Cardinals	Third baseman	Sandra Day O'Connor High School (AZ)
20	Trevor Larnach	Minnesota Twins	Outfielder	Oregon State
21	Brice Turang	Milwaukee Brewers	Shortstop	Santiago High School (CA)
22	Ryan Rolison	Colorado Rockies	Pitcher	Ole Miss
23	Anthony Seigler	New York Yankees	Catcher	Cartersville High School (GA)
24	Nico Hoerner	Chicago Cubs	Shortstop	Stanford
25	Matt McLain*	Arizona Diamondbacks	Shortstop	Beckman High School (CA)
26	Triston Casas	Boston Red Sox	Infielder	American Heritage School (FL)
27	Mason Denaburg	Washington Nationals	Pitcher	Merritt Island High School (FL)
28	Seth Beer	Houston Astros	Outfielder	Clemson
29	Bo Naylor	Cleveland Indians	Catcher	St. Joan of Arc Catholic Secondary School (ON)
30	J. T. Ginn*	Los Angeles Dodgers	Pitcher	Brandon High School (MS)

=== Compensatory round ===
Pick	Player	Team	Position	School
31	Shane McClanahan	Tampa Bay Rays (Note: Compensation pick for the Baltimore Orioles signing Alex Cobb)	Pitcher	South Florida
32	Nick Schnell	Tampa Bay Rays (Note: Compensation pick for failing to sign Drew Rasmussen in the 2017 draft)	Outfielder	Roncalli High School (IN)
33	Jackson Kowar	Kansas City Royals (Note: Compensation pick for the Milwaukee Brewers signing Lorenzo Cain)	Pitcher	Florida
34	Daniel Lynch	Kansas City Royals (Note: Compensation pick for the San Diego Padres signing Eric Hosmer)	Pitcher	Virginia
35	Ethan Hankins	Cleveland Indians (Note: Compensation pick for the Philadelphia Phillies signing Carlos Santana)	Pitcher	Forsyth Central High School (GA)

=== Competitive balance round A ===
Pick	Player	Team	Position	School
36	Gunnar Hoglund*	Pittsburgh Pirates	Pitcher	Fivay High School (FL)
37	Cadyn Grenier	Baltimore Orioles	Shortstop	Oregon State
38	Xavier Edwards	San Diego Padres	Shortstop	North Broward Preparatory School (FL)
39	Jake McCarthy	Arizona Diamondbacks	Outfielder	Virginia
40	Kris Bubic	Kansas City Royals	Pitcher	Stanford
41	Lenny Torres	Cleveland Indians	Pitcher	Beacon High School (NY)
42	Grant Lavigne	Colorado Rockies	First baseman	Bedford High School (NH)
43	Griffin Roberts	St. Louis Cardinals	Pitcher	Wake Forest

== Other notable selections ==
Round	Pick	Player	Team	Position	School
2	44	Parker Meadows	Detroit Tigers	Outfielder	Grayson High School (GA)
2	45	Sean Hjelle	San Francisco Giants	Pitcher	Kentucky
2	46	Steele Walker	Chicago White Sox	Outfielder	Oklahoma
2	47	Lyon Richardson	Cincinnati Reds	Pitcher	Jensen Beach High School (FL)
2	48	Simeon Woods Richardson	New York Mets	Pitcher	Kempner High School (TX)
2	49	Greyson Jenista	Atlanta Braves	Outfielder	Wichita State
2	51	Braxton Ashcraft	Pittsburgh Pirates	Pitcher	Robinson High School (TX)
2	52	Griffin Conine	Toronto Blue Jays	Outfielder	Duke
2	54	Josh Stowers	Seattle Mariners	Outfielder	Louisville
2	55	Owen White	Texas Rangers	Pitcher	Jesse C. Carson High School (NC)
2	56	Tyler Frank	Tampa Bay Rays	Second baseman	FAU
2	57	Jeremiah Jackson	Los Angeles Angels	Shortstop	St. Luke's Episcopal School (AL)
2	58	Jonathan Bowlan	Kansas City Royals	Pitcher	Memphis
2	59	Ryan Jeffers	Minnesota Twins	Catcher	UNC Wilmington
2	61	Josh Breaux	New York Yankees	Catcher	McLennan CC
2	62	Brennen Davis	Chicago Cubs	Outfielder·	Basha High School (AZ)
2	63	Alek Thomas	Arizona Diamondbacks	Outfielder	Mount Carmel High School (IL)
2	65	Tim Cate	Washington Nationals	Pitcher	Connecticut
2	67	Nick Sandlin	Cleveland Indians	Pitcher	Southern Miss
2	68	Michael Grove	Los Angeles Dodgers	Pitcher	West Virginia
B	70	Jeremy Eierman	Oakland Athletics	Shortstop	Missouri State
B	71	Tanner Dodson	Tampa Bay Rays	Outfielder	California
B	72	Josiah Gray	Cincinnati Reds	Pitcher	Le Moyne
2C	75	Luken Baker	St. Louis Cardinals (Note: Compensation pick for the Minnesota Twins signing Lance Lynn)	First baseman	Texas Christian
2C	77	Cole Roederer	Chicago Cubs	Outfielder	William S. Hart High School (CA)
C	78	Paul Richan	Chicago Cubs	Pitcher	San Diego
3	79	Kody Clemens	Detroit Tigers	Second baseman	Texas
3	80	Jake Wong	San Francisco Giants	Pitcher	Grand Canyon
3	81	Konnor Pilkington	Chicago White Sox	Pitcher	Mississippi State
3	82	Bren Spillane	Cincinnati Reds	Outfielder	Illinois
3	83	Carlos Cortes	New York Mets	Second baseman	South Carolina
3	84	Owen Miller	San Diego Padres	Shortstop	Illinois State
3	85	Hogan Harris	Oakland Athletics	Pitcher	Louisiana
3	87	Blaine Knight	Baltimore Orioles	Pitcher	Arkansas
3	88	Adam Kloffenstein	Toronto Blue Jays	Pitcher	Magnolia High School (TX)
3	89	Tristan Pompey	Miami Marlins	Outfielder	Kentucky
3	90	Cal Raleigh	Seattle Mariners	Catcher	Florida State
3	91	Jonathan Ornelas	Texas Rangers	Infielder	Raymond S. Kellis High School (AZ)
3	92	Ford Proctor	Tampa Bay Rays	Catcher	Rice
3	94	Kyle Isbel	Kansas City Royals	Center fielder	UNLV
3	95	Mateo Gil	St. Louis Cardinals	Shortstop	Timber Creek High School (TX)
3	96	Terrin Vavra	Colorado Rockies	Second baseman	Minnesota
3	100	Durbin Feltman	Boston Red Sox	Pitcher	TCU
3	101	Reid Schaller	Washington Nationals	Pitcher	Vanderbilt
3	102	Jeremy Peña	Houston Astros	Shortstop	Maine
3	103	Richie Palacios	Cleveland Indians	Second baseman	Towson
3	104	John Rooney	Los Angeles Dodgers	Pitcher	Hofstra
4	109	Michael Siani	Cincinnati Reds	Center fielder	William Penn Charter School (PA)
4	110	Adam Hill	New York Mets	Pitcher	South Carolina
4	111	Dylan Coleman	San Diego Padres	Pitcher	Missouri State
4	112	Tristan Beck	Atlanta Braves	Pitcher	Stanford
4	113	Alfonso Rivas	Oakland Athletics	First baseman	Arizona
4	115	Drew Rom	Baltimore Orioles	Pitcher	Highlands High School (KY)
4	117	Nick Fortes	Miami Marlins	Catcher	Ole Miss
4	118	Michael Plassmeyer	Seattle Mariners	Pitcher	Missouri
4	119	Mason Englert	Texas Rangers	Pitcher	Forney High School (TX)
4	120	Grant Witherspoon	Tampa Bay Rays	Outfielder	Tulane
4	121	Kyle Bradish	Los Angeles Angels	Pitcher	New Mexico State
4	123	Steven Gingery	St. Louis Cardinals	Pitcher	Texas Tech
4	124	DaShawn Keirsey Jr.	Minnesota Twins	Outfielder	Utah
4	125	Aaron Ashby	Milwaukee Brewers	Pitcher	Crowder College
4	126	Ryan Feltner	Colorado Rockies	Pitcher	Ohio State
4	127	Frank German	New York Yankees	Pitcher	North Florida
4	128	Ethan Roberts	Chicago Cubs	Pitcher	Tennessee Tech
4	129	Ryan Weiss	Arizona Diamondbacks	Pitcher	Wright State
4	131	Jake Irvin	Washington Nationals	Pitcher	Oklahoma
4	132	Alex McKenna	Houston Astros	Outfielder	Cal Poly
4	134	Braydon Fisher	Los Angeles Dodgers	Pitcher	Clear Falls High School (TX)
5	137	Matt Vierling	Philadelphia Phillies	Outfielder	Notre Dame
5	138	Jonathan Stiever	Chicago White Sox	Pitcher	Indiana
5	144	Grant Koch	Pittsburgh Pirates	Catcher	Arkansas
5	145	Robert Neustrom	Baltimore Orioles	Outfielder	Iowa
5	147	Chris Vallimont	Miami Marlins	Pitcher	Mercyhurst
5	150	Taj Bradley	Tampa Bay Rays	Pitcher	Redan High School (GA)
5	152	Austin Cox	Kansas City Royals	Pitcher	Mercer
5	154	Cole Sands	Minnesota Twins	Pitcher	Florida State
5	156	Jake Bird	Colorado Rockies	Pitcher	UCLA
5	157	Brandon Lockridge	New York Yankees	Outfielder	Troy
5	160	Thad Ward	Boston Red Sox	Pitcher	UCF
5	163	Steven Kwan	Cleveland Indians	Outfielder	Oregon State
5	164	Devin Mann	Los Angeles Dodgers	Second baseman	Louisville
6	168	Codi Heuer	Chicago White Sox	Pitcher	Wichita State
6	170	Nick Meyer	New York Mets	Catcher	Cal Poly
6	173	Lawrence Butler	Oakland Athletics	Outfielder	Westlake High School (GA)
6	176	Addison Barger	Toronto Blue Jays	Shortstop	C. Leon King High School (FL)
6	181	Austin Warren	Los Angeles Angels	Pitcher	UNC Wilmington
6	185	Drew Rasmussen	Milwaukee Brewers	Pitcher	Oregon State
6	186	Niko Decolati	Colorado Rockies	Outfielder	Loyola Marymount
6	188	Kohl Franklin	Chicago Cubs	Pitcher	Broken Arrow High School (OK)
6	189	Ryan Miller	Arizona Diamondbacks	Pitcher	Clemson
7	200	Kevin Smith	New York Mets	Pitcher	Georgia
7	202	Brooks Wilson	Atlanta Braves	Pitcher	Stetson
7	210	Joe Ryan	Tampa Bay Rays	Pitcher	Stanislaus State
7	211	Andrew Wantz	Los Angeles Angels	Pitcher	UNC Wilmington
7	213	Brendan Donovan	St. Louis Cardinals	Second baseman	South Alabama
7	214	Josh Winder	Minnesota Twins	Pitcher	Virginia Military Institute
7	215	David Fry	Milwaukee Brewers	Catcher	Northwestern State
7	220	Jarren Duran	Boston Red Sox	Outfielder	Long Beach State
7	222	César Salazar	Houston Astros	Catcher	Arizona
7	223	Cody Morris	Cleveland Indians	Pitcher	South Carolina
7	224	James Outman	Los Angeles Dodgers	Outfielder	Sacramento State
8	230	Tylor Megill	New York Mets	Pitcher	Arizona
8	231	Steven Wilson	San Diego Padres	Pitcher	Santa Clara
8	233	J. J. Schwarz	Oakland Athletics	Catcher	Florida
8	236	Joey Murray	Toronto Blue Jays	Pitcher	Kent State
8	238	Joey Gerber	Seattle Mariners	Pitcher	Illinois
8	243	Lars Nootbaar	St. Louis Cardinals	Outfielder	USC
8	249	Levi Kelly	Arizona Diamondbacks	Pitcher	IMG Academy (FL)
8	251	Tyler Cropley	Washington Nationals	Catcher	Iowa
9	255	Tarik Skubal	Detroit Tigers	Pitcher	Seattle
9	276	Willie MacIver	Colorado Rockies	Catcher	Washington
10	288	Bennett Sousa	Chicago White Sox	Pitcher	Virginia
10	296	Cal Stevenson	Toronto Blue Jays	Center fielder	Arizona
10	297	Tanner Andrews	Miami Marlins	Pitcher	Purdue
10	307	Josh Maciejewski	New York Yankees	Pitcher	Charlotte
11	316	David Villar	San Francisco Giants	Third baseman	South Florida
11	319	Noah Davis	Cincinnati Reds	Pitcher	UC Santa Barbara
11	324	Mike Burrows	Pittsburgh Pirates	Pitcher	Waterford High School (CT)
11	331	Connor Van Scoyoc	Los Angeles Angels	Pitcher	Jefferson High School (IA)
11	334	Michael Helman	Minnesota Twins	Second baseman	Texas A&M
11	335	Davis Daniel*	Milwaukee Brewers	Pitcher	Auburn
11	336	PJ Poulin	Colorado Rockies	Pitcher	UConn
11	339	Blaze Alexander	Arizona Diamondbacks	Shortstop	IMG Academy (FL)
11	342	Brett Conine	Houston Astros	Pitcher	Cal State Fullerton
11	344	Stephen Kolek	Los Angeles Dodgers	Pitcher	Texas A&M
12	352	Nolan Kingham	Atlanta Braves	Pitcher	Texas
12	365	Korry Howell	Milwaukee Brewers	Outfielder	Kirkwood CC
12	368	Cam Sanders	Chicago Cubs	Pitcher	LSU
12	370	Chase Shugart	Boston Red Sox	Pitcher	Texas
13	378	Jason Bilous	Chicago White Sox	Pitcher	Coastal Carolina
13	381	Antoine Kelly*	San Diego Padres	Pitcher	Maine East High School (IL)
13	391	Cooper Criswell	Los Angeles Angels	Pitcher	North Carolina
13	392	Jon Heasley	Kansas City Royals	Pitcher	Oklahoma State
13	395	Reese Olson	Milwaukee Brewers	Pitcher	North Hall High School (GA)
13	402	Shawn Dubin	Houston Astros	Pitcher	Georgetown (KY)
13	408	Davis Martin	Chicago White Sox	Pitcher	Texas Tech
14	409	Michael Byrne	Cincinnati Reds	Pitcher	Florida
14	411	Erik Sabrowski	San Diego Padres	Pitcher	Cloud County CC
14	412	Victor Vodnik	Atlanta Braves	Pitcher	Rialto High School (CA)
14	413	Gus Varland	Oakland Athletics	Pitcher	Concordia–St. Paul
14	417	Eli Villalobos	Florida Marlins	Pitcher	Long Beach State
14	429	Josh Green	Arizona Diamondbacks	Pitcher	Southeastern Louisiana
14	431	Aaron Fletcher	Washington Nationals	Pitcher	Houston
14	432	J. P. France	Houston Astros	Pitcher	Mississippi State
15	436	Matt Frisbee	San Francisco Giants	Pitcher	UNC Greensboro
15	447	Zach Greene*	Miami Marlins	Pitcher	St. Johns River State College
15	461	Evan Lee	Washington Nationals	Pitcher	Arkansas
15	463	Bryan Lavastida	Cleveland Indians	Catcher	Hillsborough CC
16	474	Colin Selby	Pittsburgh Pirates	Pitcher	Randolph–Macon
16	483	Evan Sisk	St. Louis Cardinals	Pitcher	College of Charleston
16	493	Ruben Cardenas	Cleveland Indians	Outfielder	Cal State Fullerton
17	500	Allan Winans	New York Mets	Pitcher	Campbell
17	502	Justin Dean	Atlanta Braves	Outfielder	Lenoir–Rhyne
17	507	Alex Vesia	Miami Marlins	Pitcher	Cal State East Bay
17	505	Clayton Andrews	Milwaukee Brewers	Pitcher	Long Beach State
17	513	Kyle Leahy	St. Louis Cardinals	Pitcher	Colorado Mesa
18	528	Romy González	Chicago White Sox	Third baseman	Miami (FL)
18	531	Dylan Smith*	San Diego Padres	Pitcher	Stafford High School (TX)
18	538	Noah Zavolas	Seattle Mariners	Pitcher	Harvard
18	539	Grant Wolfram	Texas Rangers	Pitcher	Davenport
18	542	R.J. Dabovich*	Kansas City Royals	Pitcher	Central Arizona College
20	591	Reiss Knehr	San Diego Padres	Pitcher	Fordham
20	592	CJ Alexander	Atlanta Braves	Third Baseman	State College of Florida, Manatee-Sarasota
20	593	Max Schuemann	Oakland Athletics	Second baseman	Eastern Michigan
20	595	Caleb Kilian*	Baltimore Orioles	Pitcher	Texas Tech
20	596	Vinny Capra	Toronto Blue Jays	Shortstop	Richmond
20	601	Kyle Tyler	Los Angeles Angels	Pitcher	Oklahoma
21	628	Grant Anderson	Seattle Mariners	Pitcher	McNeese State
21	632	Nate Eaton	Kansas City Royals	Third baseman	Virginia Military Institute
23	677	Logan O'Hoppe	Philadelphia Phillies	Catcher	St. John the Baptist Diocesan High School (NY)
23	682	William Woods	Atlanta Braves	Pitcher	Dyersburg State CC
23	683	Jonah Bride	Oakland Athletics	First baseman	South Carolina
23	692	Josh Dye	Kansas City Royals	Pitcher	Florida Gulf Coast
24	721	Isaiah Campbell*	Los Angeles Angels	Pitcher	Arkansas
26	789	Ethan Small*	Arizona Diamondbacks	Pitcher	Mississippi State
26	792	David Hensley	Houston Astros	Infielder	San Diego State
27	817	Mickey Gasper	New York Yankees	Catcher	Bryant
29	878	Levi Jordan	Chicago Cubs	Shortstop	Washington
29	882	Lyle Lin*	Houston Astros	Catcher	Arizona State
29	883	Tim Herrin	Cleveland Indians	Pitcher	Indiana
30	899	Evan Reifert*	Texas Rangers	Pitcher	North Iowa Area CC
30	904	Seth Halvorsen*	Minnesota Twins	Pitcher	Heritage Christian Academy (MN)
30	910	Ryan Bliss*	Boston Red Sox	Shortstop	Troup County High School (GA)
32	950	Jake Mangum*	New York Mets	Outfielder	Mississippi State
32	952	Trey Harris	Atlanta Braves	Outfielder	Missouri
32	955	Jayvien Sandridge	Baltimore Orioles	Pitcher	Mercersburg Academy (PA)
32	969	Austin Bergner*	Arizona Diamondbacks	Pitcher	North Carolina
33	988	Penn Murfee	Seattle Mariners	Pitcher	Santa Clara
33	1004	Drew Avans	Los Angeles Dodgers	Outfielder	Southeastern Louisiana
34	1022	Ty Madden*	Kansas City Royals	Pitcher	Cypress Ranch High School (TX)
34	1033	Spencer Schwellenbach*	Cleveland Indians	Pitcher	Heritage High School (MI)
35	1040	Ian Mejia*	New York Mets	Pitcher	Sahuarita High School (AZ)
35	1052	Kody Hoese*	Kansas City Royals	Third baseman	Tulane
35	1057	Austin Wells*	New York Yankees	Catcher	Bishop Gorman High School (NV)
36	1061	Alex Binelas*	Washington Nationals	Third baseman	Oak Creek High School (WI)
35	1063	Casey Legumina*	Cleveland Indians	Pitcher	Gonzaga
36	1068	Adrian Del Castillo*	Chicago White Sox	Catcher	Gulliver Preparatory School (FL)
36	1070	Denzel Clarke*	New York Mets	Outfielder	Everest Academy (ON)
36	1078	Justin Wrobleski*	Seattle Mariners	Pitcher	Sequoyah High School (GA)
36	1085	Brandon Williamson*	Milwaukee Brewers	Pitcher	North Iowa Area CC
37	1107	Robby Martin*	Miami Marlins	Outfielder	Thomas Jefferson High School (FL)
37	1117	Landon Marceaux*	New York Yankees	Pitcher	Destrehan High School (LA)
37	1120	Davis Wendzel*	Boston Red Sox	Third baseman	Baylor
37	1121	Cole Wilcox*	Washington Nationals	Pitcher	Heritage High School (GA)
37	1125	Cole Henry*	Detroit Tigers	Pitcher	Florence High School (AL)
38	1132	Franco Alemán*	Atlanta Braves	Pitcher	Braulio Alonso High School (FL)
38	1135	Slade Cecconi*	Baltimore Orioles	Pitcher	Trinity Preparatory School (FL)
38	1137	Bryce Miller*	Miami Marlins	Pitcher	Blinn College
38	1143	Jaden Hill*	St. Louis Cardinals	Pitcher	Ashdown High School (AR)
38	1146	Kumar Rocker*	Colorado Rockies	Pitcher	North Oconee High School (GA)
38	1153	Zack Gelof*	Cleveland Indians	Shortstop	Cape Henlopen High School (DE)
39	1157	Matheu Nelson*	Philadelphia Phillies	Catcher	Calvary Christian High School (FL)
39	1158	Mason Montgomery*	Chicago White Sox	Pitcher	Leander High School (TX)
39	1162	Jack Perkins*	Atlanta Braves	Pitcher	Kokomo High School (IN)
39	1163	Hudson Haskin*	Oakland Athletics	Outfielder	Avon Old Farms (CT)
39	1169	Shea Patterson	Texas Rangers	Third baseman	Michigan
40	1189	Ryan Cusick*	Cincinnati Reds	Pitcher	Avon Old Farms (CT)
40	1191	Michael Knorr*	San Diego Padres	Pitcher	Carlsbad High School (CA)
40	1199	Cole Uvila	Texas Rangers	Pitcher	Georgia Gwinnett College
40	1202	Ky Bush*	Kansas City Royals	Pitcher	Fremont High School (UT)
40	1210	Zach Watson*	Boston Red Sox	Outfielder	LSU

== Notes ==
Compensation picks
