= Grant Witherspoon =

American baseball player (born 1996)

- Outfielder
- Born: September 27, 1996 (age 28); Littleton, Colorado, U.S.
- Bats: Left Throws: Left

Grant Lee Witherspoon (born September 27, 1996) is an American former professional baseball outfielder.

== Career ==
=== Amateur ===
Witherspoon attended D'Evelyn Junior/Senior High School in Denver, Colorado where he played baseball, basketball, and golf. As a senior in 2015, he batted .364 alongside pitching to a 1.19 ERA. He went unselected in the 2016 Major League Baseball draft and enrolled at Tulane University where he played three years of college baseball. In 2017, he played collegiate summer baseball with the Bourne Braves of the Cape Cod Baseball League. As a junior in 2018, he batted .330 with 12 home runs and 53 RBIs over 58 starts for Tulane.

=== Tampa Bay Rays ===
After the season, the Tampa Bay Rays selected Witherspoon in the fourth round of the 2018 Major League Baseball draft. He signed with the Rays and made his professional debut with the Princeton Rays, batting .245 with five home runs and 31 RBIs over 56 games. He spent the 2019 season with the Bowling Green Hot Rods with whom he appeared in 119 games and hit .248 with ten home runs, 54 RBIs, and 22 stolen bases. He did not play a minor league game in 2020 due to the cancellation of the minor league season. He did, however, play for the Perth Heat of the Australian Baseball League that winter. Witherspoon returned to Bowling Green in 2021, slashing .269/.331/.503 with 22 home runs and seventy RBI over 99 games. He opened the 2022 season with the Montgomery Biscuits and was promoted to the Durham Bulls in late June. Over 115 games, he slashed .266/.343/.467 with 17 home runs, 61 RBI, and 15 stolen bases.

=== Detroit Tigers ===
On March 29, 2023, Witherspoon was traded to the Detroit Tigers. To open the 2023 season, he was assigned to the Double–A Erie SeaWolves. On May 22, Witherspoon was promoted to the Triple–A Toledo Mud Hens. In 73 games split between Erie and Toledo, he hit .238/.350/.410 with 10 home runs, 29 RBI, and 9 stolen bases. Witherspoon was released by the Tigers organization on August 9.

=== Seattle Mariners ===
On March 21, 2024, Witherspoon signed a minor league contract with the Seattle Mariners. In 41 games for the Double–A Arkansas Travelers, he batted .153/.250/.256 with three home runs and 16 RBI. Witherspoon was released by the Mariners organization on June 25.
