= Josh Green (baseball) =

American baseball player (born 1995)

Cleburne Railroaders
- Pitcher
- Born: August 31, 1995 (age 31); Baton Rouge, Louisiana, U.S.
- Bats: Right Throws: Right

Joshua Taylor Green (born August 31, 1995) is an American professional baseball pitcher for the Cleburne Railroaders of the American Association of Professional Baseball.

== Amateur career ==
Green attended Parkview Baptist High School in Baton Rouge, Louisiana. In 2013, his junior year, he helped lead them to a Class 3A State Championship. As a senior in 2014, Green was named second team All-District. Unselected in the 2014 Major League Baseball draft, he enrolled at Southeastern Louisiana University where he played college baseball.

Green pitched only one inning as a freshman at Southeastern Louisiana in 2015. As a sophomore, he appeared in 17 games, pitching to a 2.04 ERA with 29 strikeouts over 35 1/3 innings. In 2017, he made 25 relief appearances, going 5–0 with a 4.14 ERA in 37 innings. That summer, he played in the Alaska Baseball League for the Mat-Su Miners, and was named an All-Star as well as to the All League team after not giving up a run over 22 1/3 innings and registering seven saves. As a senior in 2018, Green moved into the starting rotation, compiling a 6–6 record and a 3.14 ERA over 15 starts, striking out 59 batters over 91 2/3 innings.

== Professional career ==
=== Arizona Diamondbacks ===
Green was drafted by the Arizona Diamondbacks in the 14th round, with the 429th overall selection, of the 2018 Major League Baseball draft.

Green signed with the Diamondbacks and made his professional debut with the Hillsboro Hops of the Low–A Northwest League, going 3–1 with a 1.09 ERA over 25 relief appearances, earning All-Star honors. To begin the 2019 season, he was assigned to the Visalia Rawhide of the High–A California League before being promoted to the Jackson Generals of the Double–A Southern League in July. Over 22 starts between the two clubs, Green pitched to an 11–5 record and a 2.71 ERA over 126 1/3 innings. The Diamondbacks named him their Minor League Pitcher of the Year. Green did not play in a game in 2020 due to the cancellation of the minor league season because of the COVID-19 pandemic, and spent the summer at Arizona's alternate site, where he refined a cutter that he developed during quarantine.

For the 2021 season, Green was assigned to the Reno Aces of the Triple-A West, appearing in 26 games (making 15 starts) in which he went 8–4 with a 7.34 ERA and 62 strikeouts over 99 1/3 innings. He returned to Reno to begin the 2022 season, but was demoted to the Amarillo Sod Poodles of the Double-A Texas League in early May. Over 38 games (two starts) between the two teams, Green went 1–3 with a 7.02 ERA, 44 strikeouts, and 29 walks over 59 innings pitched. Green also split the 2023 season between Amarillo and Reno, going 7–1 with a 4.55 ERA and 52 strikeouts over 65 1/3 innings.

Green began the 2024 campaign with Reno, also making four appearances for Amarillo and the rookie–level Arizona Complex League Diamondbacks. In 13 games for Reno, he struggled to a 6.35 ERA with eight strikeouts across 17 innings. Green was released by the Diamondbacks organization on July 25, 2024.

=== Charros de Jalisco ===
On March 4, 2025, Green signed with the Charros de Jalisco of the Mexican League. In 35 relief appearances, he went 2-5 with a 4.78 ERA and 13 saves.

Green made 19 relief appearances for the Charros in 2026, posting a 1–2 record and 7.88 ERA with 13 strikeouts over 16 innings of work. On July 17, 2026, Green was released by Jalisco.

=== Cleburne Railroaders ===
On August 3, 2026, Green signed with the Cleburne Railroaders of the American Association of Professional Baseball.
