= Tim Cate =

American baseball player (born 1997)

- Pitcher
- Born: September 30, 1997 (age 29); Manchester, Connecticut, U.S.
- Bats: Left Throws: Left

Timothy Alexander Cate (born September 30, 1997) is an American former professional baseball pitcher.

Cate pitched in college for the University of Connecticut Huskies. He was a second-round draft 65th pick of the Washington Nationals in the 2018 Major League Baseball draft.

== Amateur career ==
Cate grew up in Manchester, Connecticut and attended Howell Cheney Technical High School, where he was a pitcher and outfielder. Despite having a damaged ulnar collateral ligament of the elbow in his dominant left arm, Cate participated in a December 2013 showcase for the University of Connecticut as a junior and was invited to pitch for the program after high school. After undergoing Tommy John surgery, Cate elected not to take the 2014 spring season at Cheney Tech off, simply batting and throwing right-handed.

While at Connecticut, Cate pitched for USA Baseball's collegiate team in 2016 and 2017. In 2017, he briefly played collegiate summer baseball with the Bourne Braves of the Cape Cod Baseball League. In 2018, his season was interrupted by discomfort in his left arm that led the Huskies to shut him down before he returned at the end of the spring. Across three seasons as a Huskie, Cate pitched to a 2.99 ERA in 37 games, starting 32.

== Professional career ==
Originally projected to be drafted by a Major League Baseball team in the first round or toward the beginning of the second round of the 2018 draft as a college junior, Cate fell to 65th overall after the forearm injury. The Washington Nationals, which drafted him, declared confidence in his health in spite of the time missed during Cate's season. Cate told his hometown newspaper, the Journal Inquirer, that he was glad to be drafted by a National League team because he likes to hit (a reference to the American League's designated hitter rule). He signed a professional contract with Washington on June 12, 2018, for $986,200. Cate made his professional debut with the Auburn Doubledays, the Nationals' Low-A affiliate, on June 28, 2018. He was promoted to the Single-A Hagerstown Suns in August. In 13 games (12 starts) between the two clubs, Cate went 2-6 with a 5.02 ERA and 45 strikeouts.

Cate returned to Hagerstown to begin the 2019 season. In 13 starts for the team, he went 4-5 with a 2.82 ERA and 73 strikeouts across 70 1/3 innings pitched. Care was promoted to the High-A Potomac Nationals at the season midway point. He also made 13 starts with Potomac and tallied a 7-4 record and 3.31 ERA with 73 strikeouts across 73 1/3 innings pitched. Over the full season, his stat line totaled 11-9, 3.07 ERA, 143 2/3 innings pitched, 139 strikeouts, 32 walks and a 1.14 WHIP. This season earned him the National's Minor League Pitcher of the Year as voted on by both MLB Pipeline and the Nationals.

Cate did not play in a game in 2020 due to the cancellation of the minor league season because of the COVID-19 pandemic. He returned to action with the Double-A Harrisburg Senators in 2021, working to a 2-10 record and 5.31 ERA with 81 strikeouts across 21 starts. Cate split the 2022 campaign between Harrisburg and the High-A Wilmington Blue Rocks. In 23 games (21 starts) for the two affiliates, he compiled an aggregate 6-8 record and 4.61 ERA with 103 strikeouts across 109 1/3 innings pitched.

Cate split the 2023 season between Harrisburg and the Triple-A Rochester Red Wings. In 42 appearances out of the bullpen for the two affiliates, he accumulated a 4-3 record and 4.01 ERA with 42 strikeouts across 42 2/3 innings pitched. Cate returned to Rochester in 2024, logging a 7-3 record and 5.86 ERA with 61 strikeouts and 3 saves in 55 1/3 innings pitched across 53 appearances. He elected free agency following the season on November 4, 2024.

== Pitching style ==
Though his left hand is dominant, Cate has good enough control and strength in his right arm that his college coach at the University of Connecticut, Jim Penders, described him as "ambidextrous". In his junior season at Connecticut in 2018, Cate threw a fastball topping out at 94 miles per hour (151 km/h), along with a 12–6 curveball considered his best pitch and a less frequently used changeup. Washington Nationals scouting director Kris Kline described his curveball as one of the best left-handed curves in the 2018 draft class. At 6 feet (1.8 m) tall, Cate is considered on the smaller side for a starting pitcher, although his stature and repertoire have elicited comparisons to Nationals left-hander Gio González.
