= Cimarron-Memorial High School =

Public high school in Las Vegas, Nevada, US

Location
- 2301 N. Tenaya Way; Las Vegas, Nevada, 89128; 36.20151°N 115.2528°W

Information
- School type: Public high school
- Motto: C-Commitment M-Motivation H-Honor S-Success
- Established: 1991
- School district: Clark County School District
- Principal: Colin McNaught
- Teaching staff: 114.00 (FTE)
- Grades: 9–12
- Enrollment: 2,483 (2024–2025)
- Student to teacher ratio: 21.78
- Colours: Maroon, Silver and white
- Athletics conference: Sunset 4A Region
- Team name: Spartan
- Publication: Spartan Sentinel
- Website: cimarronmemorialhs.ccsd.net

Cimarron-Memorial High School is a public high school in Las Vegas, Nevada, and part of the Clark County School District.

== Extracurricular activities ==
=== Robotics ===
Cimarron-Memorial houses FIRST Robotics Competition Team 987, The HIGHROLLERS.

Founded in October 2001 by two teachers at Cimarron-Memorial High School, Marc Rogers and Joe Barry, team 987 was formed. The team had only nine students and two mentors at the time, had little funding, and no prior robotics experience. The team, which was initially called "Ultimus Acumen," persevered in spite of many obstacles such as a lack of funding and experience. They progressively gained the support of sponsors and the school through trial and error and early successes allowing the program to expand to host many teams from the area in workshops and create numerous STEM programs at Cimarron. They have built "The Shop" at Cimarron-Memorial where they have a field for that year's game and offer students hands on experiences with CNCs, Lathes, Mills, and much more. They celebrated their 20th anniversary in 2022.

The HIGHROLLERS, winning the World Championship in 2007, and being inducted into the FIRST Hall of Fame in 2016, rank in the top 10% of FIRST robotics teams worldwide.

Awards

- 1x World Championship Winner
- 2x World Championship Finalist
- 7x Einstein Appearances
- 27x Regional Wins
- 45x Blue Banners

=== Athletics ===
The athletic program that represents Cimarron-Memorial is known as the Spartans and competes in the Northwest Division of the Sky 4A Region.

==== Nevada Interscholastic Activities Association State Championships ====
- Basketball (Boys) - 1994, 1999
- Football - 1998, 1999
- Wrestling - 1996, 1997, 1998, 1999, 2000, 2003, 2004, 2005, 2006, 2009, 2010, 2011
- Cheerleading - 2008, 2009, 2010
- Track and Field (Boys)- 2004
- Flag Football - 2017

== Notable alumni ==
- Marcus Banks - NBA Memphis Grizzlies
- Niko Decolati - baseball player
- Brandon Marshall - NFL player (currently with Denver Broncos, Jacksonville Jaguars)
- Michael Dunn - Current MLB player (currently with Colorado Rockies, New York Yankees, Atlanta Braves)
- Vernon Fox - American football player, Denver Broncos, current head football coach at Faith Lutheran in Las Vegas, NV.
- Brad Thompson - baseball player, currently with the St. Louis Cardinals
- Mike Esposito - MLB player (Colorado Rockies pitcher)
- Beth Riesgraf - Hollywood actress
- Roy Nelson - professional mixed martial artist, was competing in the UFC, currently in Bellator MMA
- Zach Walters - baseball player
- Amy Purdy - Paralympic snowboarder and public speaker

== Feeder schools ==
- Richard H. Bryan Elementary School
- Marc Kahre Elementary School
- Dorothy Eisenberg Elementary School
- James B. McMillian Elementary School
- Edythe & Lloyd Katz Elementary School
- Berkeley L. Bunker Elementary School
- Doris M. Reed Elementary School
- Bertha Ronzone Elementary School
- R.E. Tobler Elementary School
- Ernest Becker Middle School
- Irwin & Susan Molasky Junior High School
- J. Harold Brinley Middle School
