= Miguel Castro =

Dominican baseball player (born 1994)

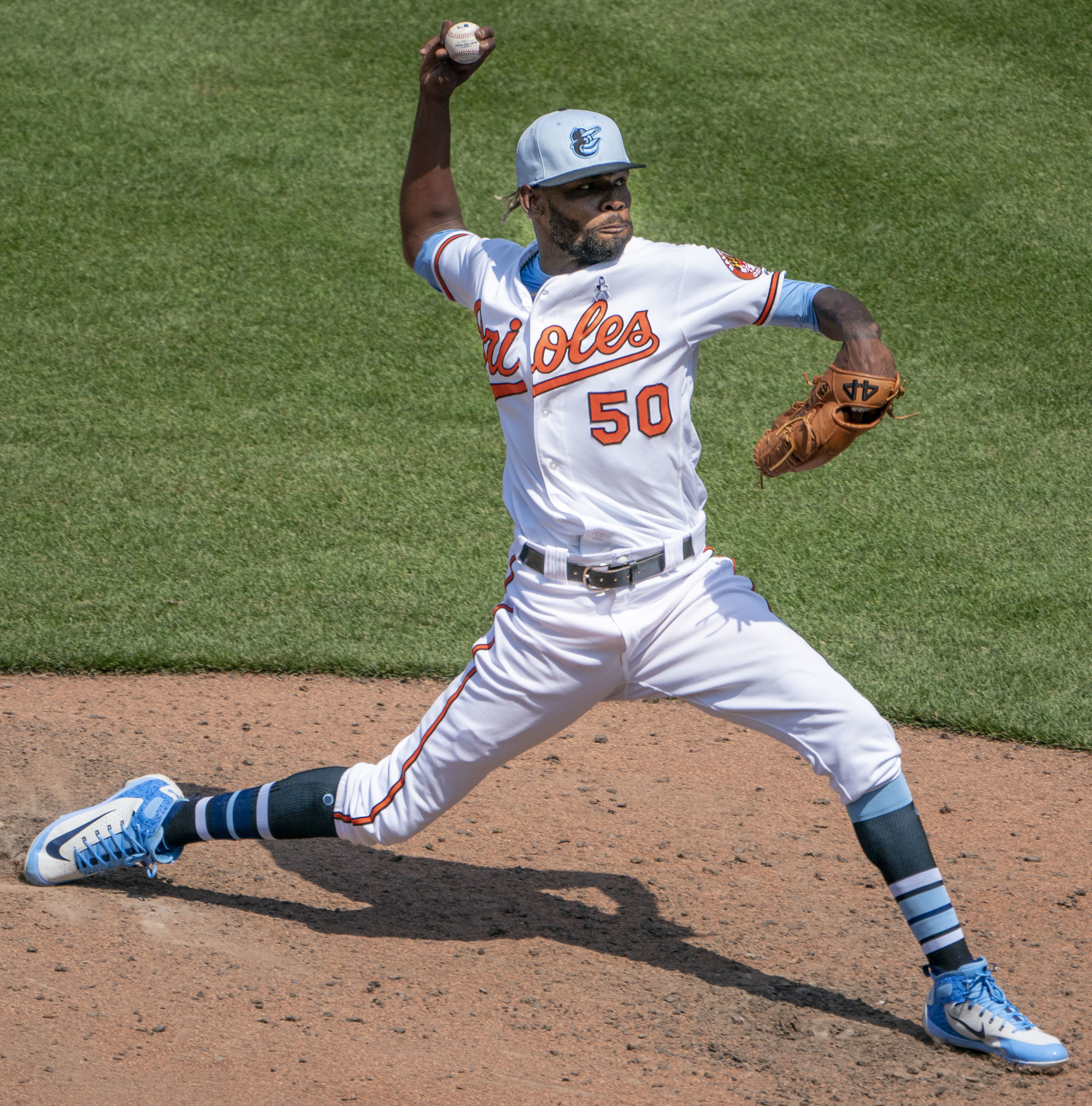
- Castro pitching for the Baltimore Orioles in 2018

Sultanes de Monterrey – No. 10
- Pitcher
- Born: December 24, 1994 (age 31); La Romana, Dominican Republic
- Bats: Right Throws: Right

MLB debut
- April 6, 2015, for the Toronto Blue Jays

MLB statistics (through 2025 season)
- Win–loss record: 22–28
- Earned run average: 4.24
- Strikeouts: 414
- Stats at Baseball Reference

Teams
- Toronto Blue Jays (2015); Colorado Rockies (2015–2016); Baltimore Orioles (2017–2020); New York Mets (2020–2021); New York Yankees (2022); Arizona Diamondbacks (2023–2024); Chicago White Sox (2025)

Miguel Ángel Castro (born December 24, 1994) is a Dominican professional baseball pitcher for the Sultanes de Monterrey of the Mexican League. He has previously played in MLB for the Toronto Blue Jays, Colorado Rockies, Baltimore Orioles, New York Mets, New York Yankees, Arizona Diamondbacks and Chicago White Sox. Castro signed with the Blue Jays as an international free agent in 2012, and made his MLB debut in 2015.

== Professional career ==
=== Toronto Blue Jays ===
Castro signed with the Toronto Blue Jays as an international free agent in 2012, and received a $43,000 signing bonus. He made his professional debut in 2012 with the Dominican Summer League Blue Jays, and earned a 3–2 record, 4.73 earned run average, and 20 strikeouts in 20 1/3 innings. Castro began the 2013 season with the Dominican Summer League Blue Jays, and was later promoted to the Gulf Coast League Blue Jays and Bluefield Blue Jays. In total, he posted a 6–2 record, 1.54 ERA, and 88 strikeouts in 70 innings pitched. His performance in the DSL earned him the Webster Award, given to the best Blue Jays prospect at each minor league level. In 2014, Castro continued his progression through the minor league system, earning promotions to the Vancouver Canadians, Lansing Lugnuts, and Dunedin Blue Jays. He earned an 8–3 record, a 2.69 ERA, and 78 strikeouts in 80 1/3 innings spread across three minor league levels.

Castro was invited to 2015 spring training but was considered to be a long-shot to make the team, and General Manager Alex Anthopoulos stated before camp began that Castro would likely begin the 2015 season in Dunedin. However, after pitching 6 2/3 scoreless innings over 4 appearances, with 4 strikeouts and no walks, many believed that Castro had earned a spot on the roster. After Steve Delabar was optioned to minor league camp on March 26, it was reported that Castro would likely make the Opening Day roster as a reliever. His role in the bullpen was confirmed on March 31.

Castro made his MLB debut on April 6, 2015, against the New York Yankees. He pitched 1 1/3 innings and closed out the game as the Blue Jays won 6–1. At 20 years, 103 days old, Castro became the youngest pitcher to appear for the Blue Jays, breaking a nearly 38-year-old record held by Víctor Cruz. His record was short-lived, however, as it was broken only two days later by teammate Roberto Osuna. After a poor season debut by Brett Cecil, Castro was temporarily moved to the closer role on April 9. He earned his first MLB save that night, closing out a 6–3 win over the Yankees. Castro was moved back into a regular relief role in the bullpen on April 28, after recording 4 saves in 6 opportunities. On May 3, Castro was optioned to the Triple-A Buffalo Bisons.

=== Colorado Rockies ===
On July 28, 2015, Castro was traded to the Colorado Rockies, along with José Reyes, Jeff Hoffman, and Jesús Tinoco, in exchange for Troy Tulowitzki and LaTroy Hawkins. The Rockies optioned him to the Triple-A Albuquerque Isotopes. He was called up by the Rockies on September 1 and made his Rockies debut that day. On April 2, 2017, Castro was designated for assignment.

=== Baltimore Orioles ===
On April 7, 2017, Castro was traded to the Baltimore Orioles for cash considerations or a player to be named later (Jon Keller). He debuted for the Orioles on May 17 against the Detroit Tigers, striking out one batter in one scoreless inning of relief. He pitched two scoreless innings the following day as well. In his first season with Baltimore, he posted an ERA of 3.53 in 39 games.

The following season, he appeared in 63 appearances, posting an ERA of 3.96 in 86 1/3 innings. He shared the major league lead in balks, with three. In 2019 for the Orioles, Castro appeared in 65 games, allowing a career-high 10 home runs in 73 1/3 innings of work, registering a 4.66 ERA.

=== New York Mets ===
On August 31, 2020, the Orioles traded Castro to the New York Mets for pitcher Kevin Smith and a player to be named later. In 2020, Castro pitched in 26 games between the Orioles and Mets, recording a 4.01 ERA with 38 strikeouts in 24 2/3 innings pitched. In 2021, Castro recorded a career-low 3.45 ERA along with 77 strikeouts and 43 walks in 70 1/3 innings.

On March 22, 2022, Castro signed a $2.62 million contract with the Mets, avoiding salary arbitration.

=== New York Yankees ===
On April 3, 2022, the Mets traded Castro to the New York Yankees for Joely Rodríguez. On August 1, he was placed on the 60-day injured list with a right shoulder strain. He was activated on October 3. In 34 games for New York, Castro registered a 4.03 ERA with 31 strikeouts in 29.0 innings pitched.

=== Arizona Diamondbacks ===
On December 2, 2022, Castro signed a one-year contract with an option for 2024 with the Arizona Diamondbacks. He made a league–high 75 appearances for Arizona in 2023, recording a 4.31 ERA with 60 strikeouts and 7 saves across 64 2/3 innings pitched.

Castro made 11 appearances for the Diamondbacks in 2024, struggling to a 5.93 ERA with 8 strikeouts over 13 2/3 innings of work. Castro was designated for assignment by Arizona on July 30, 2024. He was released the following day.

=== Houston Astros ===
On December 30, 2024, Castro signed a minor league contract with the Houston Astros that included an invitation to spring training. Castro was assigned to the Triple-A Sugar Land Space Cowboys to begin the 2025 season, where he logged a 3–0 record and 2.29 ERA with 20 strikeouts and five saves across 17 appearances.

=== Chicago White Sox ===
On May 15, 2025, Castro was traded to the Chicago White Sox in exchange for international bonus pool space. The next day, the White Sox selected Castro's contract, adding him to their active roster. In six appearances for Chicago, he struggled to a 7.50 ERA with four strikeouts over six innings of work. On May 28, Castro suffered a season-ending knee injury after slipping on first base while covering on a ground ball during a game against the New York Mets. The injury was later revealed to be a torn patellar tendon.

On January 15, 2026, Castro signed a minor league contract with the Los Angeles Angels. However, it was revealed on February 11, that the deal had fallen through and he would not join the Angels.

=== Leones de Yucatán ===
On February 13, 2026, Castro signed with the Leones de Yucatán of the Mexican League. In 40 relief appearances for Yucatán, he posted a 2–3 record with a 4.89 ERA and 43 strikeouts across 38 2/3 innings pitched.

=== Sultanes de Monterrey ===
On August 4, 2026, Castro was traded to the Sultanes de Monterrey of the Mexican League in exchange for Stephen Tarpley.

== Personal life ==
Castro was born in La Romana, Dominican Republic. His father was a boxer. Castro spent his $43,000 signing bonus on a prostate operation for his father, as well as a surgery to remove his mother's fibrous tumour.
