= Cole Uvila =

American baseball player (born 1994)

- Pitcher
- Born: January 30, 1994 (age 32); Port Angeles, Washington, U.S.
- Bats: Right Throws: Right
- Stats at Baseball Reference

Cole Baker Uvila (born January 30, 1994) is an American former professional baseball pitcher.

== Amateur career ==
Uvila attended Port Angeles High School in Port Angeles, Washington. Undrafted out of high school, Uvila attended Pierce College in Lakewood, Washington, for two years (2013–2014). He posted a 5–2 record with a 1.77 ERA and 74 strikeouts over 64 innings in 2014. Uvila then transferred to Georgia State University to play for the Georgia State Panthers for two seasons (2015–2016). He posted a 1–6 record with a 4.24 ERA and 46 strikeouts over 54 innings in 2015. Uvila entered 2016 as the Friday night starter, but suffered a torn ulnar collateral ligament during his third game of the season, resulting in Tommy John surgery that ended his season. Uvila transferred to Georgia Gwinnett College for his final season of college baseball. He posted a 4–2 record with a 4.75 ERA and 80 strikeouts over 55 innings in 2018.

== Professional career ==
=== Texas Rangers ===
Uvila was drafted by the Texas Rangers in the 40th round, with the 1199th overall selection, of the 2018 MLB draft. He signed with Texas for a $1,000 signing bonus. He spent his debut season of 2018 with the Spokane Indians of the Low-A Northwest League, going 1–0 with a 1.42 ERA and 48 strikeouts over 31 2/3 innings. Uvila opened the 2019 season with the Hickory Crawdads of the Single-A South Atlantic League, and threw seven scoreless innings for them before being promoted to the Down East Wood Ducks of the High–A Carolina League. He finished the 2019 season going a combined 7–3 with a 2.23 ERA and 95 strikeouts over 64 2/3 innings. Uvila played for the Surprise Saguaros of the Arizona Fall League following the 2019 season, and was named a Fall League All-Star.

Uvila did not play in a game in 2020 due to the cancellation of the Minor League Baseball season because of the COVID-19 pandemic. Uvila opened the 2021 season with the Frisco RoughRiders of the Double-A Central. He was promoted to the Round Rock Express of the Triple-A West on July 31, after going 2–2 with a 2.90 ERA and 42 strikeouts over 31 innings for Frisco. Uvila struggled to an 8.74 ERA with 18 strikeouts over 22 2/3 innings for Round Rock.

=== Baltimore Orioles ===
On December 8, 2021, the Baltimore Orioles selected Uvila from the Rangers in the minor league phase of the Rule 5 draft. Uvila spent the 2022 season with the Triple-A Norfolk Tides, making 42 appearances and recording a 3.48 ERA with 45 strikeouts and 12 saves in 44 innings pitched. Uvila returned to Norfolk to begin the 2023 season, pitching in three games and logging a 2.25 ERA with three strikeouts in four innings of work. He was released by the Orioles organization on May 19, 2023.
