= Niko Decolati =

American baseball player (born 1997)

- Right fielder
- Born: August 12, 1997 (age 29); Boulder, Colorado, U.S.
- Bats: Right Throws: Right

Nicholas Quinn Decolati (born August 12, 1997) is an American former professional baseball right fielder.

== Amateur career ==
Decolati was born in Boulder, Colorado, before moving to Las Vegas due to his father's job; he attended Cimarron-Memorial High School in Las Vegas. As a junior in 2014, he batted .414 with eight home runs. In 2015, Decolati senior year, he hit .411 with ten home runs, 25 RBI, and 39 runs, and was named the Southern Nevada Player of the Year.

After graduating high school in 2015, Decolati enrolled at Loyola Marymount University where he played college baseball. As a freshman in 2016, he played in 47 games (making forty starts) in which he hit .306 with four home runs and 33 RBI, earning a spot on the All-West Coast Conference Freshman Team. In 2017, Decolati played in 56 games, slashing .320/.426/.432 with four home runs and 24 RBI. That summer, he played collegiate summer baseball for the Orleans Firebirds of the Cape Cod Baseball League, where he was named a league all-star. As a junior in 2018, Decolati started 54-of-55 games and batted .271 with six home runs and 21 RBI.

== Professional career ==
After his junior year, he was selected by the Colorado Rockies in the sixth round, with the 186th overall selection, of the 2018 Major League Baseball draft.

Decolati signed with the Rockies and was assigned to the Grand Junction Rockies of the Rookie-level Pioneer League. After being a third baseman all through high school and college, the Rockies immediately moved him to right field, where he was subsequently named an All-Star. Over 69 games in Grand Junction, Decolati batted .327 with 11 home runs and 56 RBI. In 2019, he missed time at the beginning of the year after suffering a broken wrist, but returned to play in June with the Asheville Tourists of the Single-A South Atlantic League, hitting .265 with six home runs and 38 RBI over 77 appearances. Decolati did not play in a game in 2020 due to the cancellation of the minor league season because of the COVID-19 pandemic.

Decolati was assigned to the Spokane Indians of the High-A West for the 2021 season, slashing .264/.341/.402 with 11 home runs, 56 RBI, and 26 stolen bases over 100 games. He spent the 2022 season with the Hartford Yard Goats of the Double-A Eastern League but missed time due to injury. Over 44 appearances for Hartford, Decolati slashed .199/.327/.277 with one home run and 17 RBI. He returned to Hartford for the 2023 season, slashing .225/.380/.313 with three home runs, 16 RBI, and 12 stolen bases.

In 2024, Decolati played in only 10 games for the rookie-level Arizona Complex League Rockies, hitting .143/.333/.143 with three RBI and one stolen base. He elected free agency following the season on November 4, 2024.
