= Zach Greene =

American baseball player (born 1996)

Free agent
- Pitcher
- Born: August 29, 1996 (age 29); Jacksonville, Florida, U.S.
- Bats: Right Throws: Right
- Stats at Baseball Reference

Zachary Blue Greene (born August 29, 1996) is an American professional baseball pitcher who is a free agent.

== Career ==
Greene attended Atlantic Coast High School and St. Johns River State College. He was selected by the Miami Marlins in the 15th round of the 2018 MLB draft. Instead of signing, he transferred to the University of South Alabama, where he was named a second-team All-American.

=== New York Yankees ===
The New York Yankees selected Greene in the eighth round, 255th overall, in the 2019 Major League Baseball draft. He split his first professional season between the rookie-level Gulf Coast League Yankees and Low-A Staten Island Yankees. Greene did not play in a game in 2020 due to the cancellation of the minor league season because of the COVID-19 pandemic.

Greene returned to action in 2021 with the High-A Hudson Valley Renegades and Double-A Somerset Patriots. In 34 appearances split between the two affiliates, he accumulated a 4-7 record and 3.17 ERA with 91 strikeouts and three saves across 59 2/3 innings pitched. Greene made 48 appearances for the Triple-A Scranton/Wilkes-Barre RailRiders during the 2022 season, posting a 9-0 record and 3.42 ERA with 96 strikeouts across 68 1/3 innings pitched.

On December 7, 2022, the New York Mets selected Greene from the Yankees in the Rule 5 draft. On March 12, 2023, Greene was removed from the 40-man roster and placed on outright waivers. Greene was returned to the Yankees organization on March 14. He would spend the season with Scranton and the rookie-level Florida Complex League Yankees, registering a combined 2-1 record and 5.51 ERA with 31 strikeouts and two saves across 32 2/3 innings pitched.

Greene missed the entirety of the 2024 campaign due to an injury. He made two scoreless appearances for Double-A Somerset in 2025, logging two strikeouts over 1 2/3 innings. Greene was released by the Yankees organization on April 18, 2025.

=== Piratas de Campeche ===
On May 20, 2025, Greene signed with the Piratas de Campeche of the Mexican League. In six appearances for Campeche, he struggled to a 22.09 ERA with four strikeouts across 3 2/3 innings pitched. Greene was released by the Piratas on June 6.
