= Nick Schnell =

American baseball player (born 2000)

Free agent
- Center fielder
- Born: March 27, 2000 (age 26); Indianapolis, Indiana, U.S.
- Bats: Left Throws: Right
- Stats at Baseball Reference

Nicholas David Schnell (born March 27, 2000) is an American professional baseball outfielder who is a free agent.

== Amateur career ==
Schnell graduated from Roncalli High School in Indianapolis, Indiana. As a senior he batted .535 with 15 home runs and 37 RBIs and was named Indiana's Gatorade Baseball Player of the Year. For his high school career, he hit .473 with 25 home runs and 109 RBI. He signed to play college baseball at the University of Louisville.

== Professional career ==
=== Tampa Bay Rays ===
Schnell was selected 32nd overall by the Tampa Bay Rays in the 2018 Major League Baseball draft, and he signed for $2.3 million. Schnell was assigned to the Rookie-level Gulf Coast League Rays where he homered in his first professional at-bat. Over 19 games for the Rays, he batted .239 with one home run and four RBI. Schnell returned to the GCL to begin 2019 before earning promotions to the Princeton Rays of the rookie-level Appalachian League and the Bowling Green Hot Rods of the Single-A Midwest League during the year. Over 55 games between the three clubs, he slashed .265/.325/.448 with five home runs and 31 RBI.

Schnell did not play in a game in 2020 due to the cancellation of the minor league season because of the COVID-19 pandemic. To begin the 2021 season, Schnell was assigned to the Charleston RiverDogs of the Low-A East. He was placed on the injured list in mid-July and missed the rest of the season. Over 52 games prior to the injury, Schnell slashed .174/.300/.321 with eight home runs, 29 RBI, and 13 stolen bases. He returned to Charleston to open the 2022 season and batted .257 with three home runs and 19 RBI over 38 games before missing the rest of the season with an injury.

Schnell spent the 2023 campaign with the High-A Bowling Green Hot Rods, playing in 103 games and slashing .227/.308/.440 with 16 home runs and 55 RBI. He split the 2024 season between the Double-A Montgomery Biscuits and Triple-A Durham Bulls. In 107 appearances for the two affiliates, Schnell batted .251/.314/.405 with 12 home runs, 49 RBI, and 11 stolen bases. He elected free agency following the season on November 4, 2024.

=== Washington Nationals ===
On December 23, 2024, Schnell signed a minor league contract with the Washington Nationals. He opened the 2025 season with the Harrisburg Senators and was promoted to the Rochester Red Wings in May. In 129 total appearances for the two affiliates, Schnell slashed .257/.321/.478 with 23 home runs, 84 RBI, and 18 stolen bases. He elected free agency following the season on November 6.

=== San Diego Padres ===
On November 30, 2025, Schnell signed a minor league contract with the San Diego Padres. In 59 appearances for the Triple–A El Paso Chihuahuas, he batted .239/.320/.479 with 12 home runs, 38 RBI, and five stolen bases. Schnell was released by the Padres organization on July 15, 2026.
