= Kevin Smith (pitcher) =

American baseball player (born 1997)

Free agent
- Pitcher
- Born: May 13, 1997 (age 29); Dunwoody, Georgia, U.S.
- Bats: Right Throws: Left

Kevin Patrick Smith (born May 13, 1997) is an American professional baseball pitcher who is a free agent. He was drafted by the New York Mets in the seventh round of the 2018 Major League Baseball draft.

== Career ==
Smith attended Dunwoody High School in Dunwoody, Georgia, and played college baseball at the University of Georgia. In 2016 and 2017, he played collegiate summer baseball with the Orleans Firebirds of the Cape Cod Baseball League.

=== New York Mets ===
Smith was drafted by the New York Mets in the seventh round, with the 200th overall selection, of the 2018 Major League Baseball draft.

Smith made his professional debut with the Low–A Brooklyn Cyclones, going 4–1 with a 0.76 ERA over 23 2/3 innings. He started 2019 with the High–A St. Lucie Mets before being promoted to the Double–A Binghamton Rumble Ponies. Over 23 starts between the two clubs, Smith went 8–7 with a 3.15 ERA, striking out 130 over 117 innings.

=== Baltimore Orioles ===
On August 31, 2020, the Mets traded Smith to the Baltimore Orioles in exchange for Miguel Castro. He did not play in a game in 2020 due to the cancellation of the minor league season because of the COVID-19 pandemic. Smith spent the 2021 season with the Double-A Bowie Baysox and the Triple-A Norfolk Tides, pitching 82 1/3 innings and going 3–7 with a 4.59 ERA over 22 games (twenty starts).

The Orioles added Smith to their 40-man roster on November 19, 2021, in order to protect him from the Rule 5 draft. He was outrighted off the roster on April 15, 2022. Smith made 19 appearances (6 starts) for Norfolk in 2022, recording an 0-5 record and 4.66 ERA with 44 strikeouts in 48 1/3 innings pitched. He was released by the Orioles organization on March 26, 2023.

=== Charleston Dirty Birds ===
On June 9, 2024, Smith signed with the Charleston Dirty Birds of the Atlantic League of Professional Baseball. In 12 starts for Charleston, he compiled a 4–4 record and 5.79 ERA with 64 strikeouts across 56 innings of work. Smith became a free agent following the season.

=== Gastonia Ghost Peppers ===
On April 11, 2025, Smith signed with the Gastonia Ghost Peppers of the Atlantic League of Professional Baseball. In 5 starts 20.2 innings he went 0-2 with a 6.97 ERA with 19 walks and 19 strikeouts. He became a free agent following the season.
