= Vernon Fox =

American football player and coach (born 1979)

No. 36, 39
- Position: Safety

Personal information
- Born: October 9, 1979 (age 47); Las Vegas, Nevada, U.S.
- Listed height: 5 ft 10 in (1.78 m)
- Listed weight: 203 lb (92 kg)

Career information
- High school: Cimarron-Memorial (Las Vegas)
- College: Fresno State
- NFL draft: 2002: undrafted

Career history

Playing
- San Diego Chargers (2002–2003); Detroit Lions (2004–2005); Washington Redskins (2006–2007); Denver Broncos (2008–2009)

Coaching
- Faith Lutheran (2013–2019) Head coach

Awards and highlights
- 2× First-team All-WAC (2000-2001)

Career NFL statistics
- Total tackles: 148
- Fumble recoveries: 1
- Pass deflections: 6
- Interceptions: 2
- Defensive touchdowns: 1
- Stats at Pro Football Reference

Vernon Lee Fox, III (born October 9, 1979) is an American former professional football player who was a safety in the National Football League (NFL). He played college football for the Fresno State Bulldogs and was signed by the San Diego Chargers as an undrafted free agent after the 2002 NFL Draft. Fox is currently an ordained minister and is an associate pastor in Las Vegas. He is a lead pastor at Salt Church International in Las Vegas, Nevada. In February 2013, he was hired to be head football coach and admissions counselor at Faith Lutheran Middle School and High School in Las Vegas.

Fox also played for the Detroit Lions, Denver Broncos, and Washington Commanders.

== Early life ==
Vernon Fox was born in Las Vegas, Nevada to Willette Fox and Vernon Fox II. He attended high school at Cimarron-Memorial in Las Vegas.

== Personal life ==
Fox is married to Tai Fox. They have two children together. Fox is a Christian.
