= Parkview Baptist High School =

Coordinates: 30°23′53″N 91°3′0″W

Parkview Baptist School

Location
- 5750 Parkview Church Road; Baton Rouge, Louisiana 70816; United States

Information
- Type: Private
- Motto: Education With an Eternal Foundation
- Religious affiliation: Baptist
- Established: 1981
- Grades: K-12
- Colors: Red, white, and blue
- Mascot: Eagle
- Nickname: Eagles
- Yearbook: Eagle
- Website: www.parkviewbaptist.com

Parkview Baptist School (PBS) is a private K-12 Christian school located in Baton Rouge, Louisiana, United States.

== Overview ==
With 1,260 students, Parkview Baptist School is the largest private school in Louisiana. The school began with students from kindergarten to sixth grade in 1981, adding grades 7–12 in 1983. PBS is now divided into three administrative units: Parkview Baptist Elementary School (K-4), Parkview Baptist Middle School (5-8), and Parkview Baptist High School (9-12). Grade 5 was moved to be part of the middle school in fall 2008.

In 1981, the school was founded by members of the Parkview Baptist Church. The school and church were integrated into one core entity, but both maintain control of individual issues.

Parkview is governed by a school board of appointed members from the school, church, and community.

== Racial history ==
Following the rise of non-accreted Christian academies in the 1980s due to desegregation pushback, Parkview Baptist High School opened due to parental fears of public funding allowing legal integration. The school has signaled changes in recent advertising and enrollment practices. However, despite these signals, PBS remains 89.9% white.

== Accreditation ==
Parkview Baptist High School is certified by the Louisiana State Board of Elementary and Secondary Education as an approved K-12 education program. It is also accredited by the Southern Association of Colleges and Schools (SACS). It is one of only 345 independent schools in 11 states with this dual accreditation. The school has also been approved to receive foreign students by the United States Immigration and Naturalization Services.

== Athletics ==
Parkview Baptist High athletics competes in the LHSAA.

=== Championships ===
Football championships

- (5) State Championships: 2001, 2007, 2010, 2012, 2015

== Notable alumni ==
- Darry Beckwith, former NFL and CFL linebacker, graduated in 2005
- Josh Green, baseball player, graduated in 2014
- Shelley Regner, actress, Pitch Perfect and Pitch Perfect 2
- Brad Wing, NFL punter for the New York Giants, graduated in 2010
