= Darry Beckwith =

American gridiron football player (born 1987)

No. 46, 48
- Position: Linebacker

Personal information
- Born: May 15, 1987 (age 39); Baton Rouge, Louisiana, U.S.
- Listed height: 6 ft 0 in (1.83 m)
- Listed weight: 242 lb (110 kg)

Career information
- High school: Parkview Baptist (Baton Rouge)
- College: LSU
- NFL draft: 2009: undrafted

Career history
- San Diego Chargers (2009–2010); Indianapolis Colts (2011)*; New Orleans Saints (2011)*; Toronto Argonauts (2013)*
- * Offseason or practice squad member only

Awards and highlights
- BCS national champion (2008); 2× Second-team All-SEC (2007, 2008)

Career NFL statistics
- Tackles: 1
- Stats at Pro Football Reference

Darry Douglas Beckwith, Jr. (born May 15, 1987) is an American former professional football player who was a linebacker in the National Football League (NFL). He was signed by the San Diego Chargers as an undrafted free agent in 2009. He played college football for the LSU Tigers.

He was also a member of the Indianapolis Colts, New Orleans Saints, and Toronto Argonauts. His cousin Kendell Beckwith also played in the NFL.

== Early life ==
Beckwith played high school football at Parkview Baptist High School in Baton Rouge, LA.

== Professional career ==
=== Pre-draft ===
Leading up to the 2009 NFL draft, Beckwith was considered a second-round prospect at one point.

=== San Diego Chargers ===
After not being selected in the 2009 NFL draft, Beckwith was signed as an undrafted free agent by the San Diego Chargers. He was waived on September 5 during final roster cuts, and subsequently re-signed to the practice squad on September 6. His practice squad contract expired at the end of the 2009 season. Beckwith signed a future contract with the team on February 10, 2010.

=== Indianapolis Colts ===
Beckwith spent two seasons in San Diego before signing with the Indianapolis Colts on August 1, 2011. He was waived the following day.

=== New Orleans Saints ===
Beckwith spent time on the New Orleans Saints practice team in 2012.

=== Toronto Argonauts ===
On March 20, 2013, Beckwith signed with the Toronto Argonauts of the Canadian Football League. He was released by the Argonauts on May 2, 2013.
