= Derek Brown (tight end) =

American football player (born 1970)

No. 86, 83
- Position: Tight end

Personal information
- Born: March 31, 1970 (age 56); Falls Church, Virginia, U.S.
- Listed height: 6 ft 6 in (1.98 m)
- Listed weight: 271 lb (123 kg)

Career information
- High school: Merritt Island (Merritt Island, Florida)
- College: Notre Dame
- NFL draft: 1992: 1st round, 14th overall pick
- Expansion draft: 1995: 24th round, 47th overall pick

Career history
- New York Giants (1992–1994); Jacksonville Jaguars (1995–1997); Oakland Raiders (1998); Arizona Cardinals (1999–2000)

Awards and highlights
- First-team All-American (1991)

Career NFL statistics
- Receptions: 43
- Receiving yards: 401
- Touchdowns: 1
- Stats at Pro Football Reference

Derek Vernon Brown (born March 31, 1970) is an American former professional football player who was a tight end in the National Football League (NFL).

== College career ==
Brown attended high school at Merritt Island High School and played college football for the Notre Dame Fighting Irish. In his final two seasons at Notre Dame, he recorded 37 catches for 545 yards and five touchdowns.

== Professional career ==
Pre-draft measurables
Height	Weight	Arm length	Hand span	40-yard dash	10-yard split	20-yard split	20-yard shuttle	Vertical jump	Broad jump	Bench press
6 ft 5 5/8 in (1.97 m)	252 lb (114 kg)	34 in (0.86 m)	10 1/2 in (0.27 m)	4.98 s	1.73 s	2.83 s	4.36 s	31.0 in (0.79 m)	9 ft 6 in (2.90 m)	16 reps

Brown was selected in the first round with the 14th overall pick in the 1992 NFL draft by the New York Giants. As a rookie, he recorded four catches for 31 yards, and in his second season, he made seven catches for 56 yards. In 1994, Brown mostly played on special teams.

Brown was selected by the Jacksonville Jaguars in the 1995 NFL expansion draft. He missed the entire 1995 season after a hit by Denver Broncos safety Tim Hauck during a preseason game. Brown suffered bruised ribs, a collapsed lung and damage to his spleen and kidney. He spent 10 days in the hospital and recovered in a wheelchair. Despite the injuries, Brown's best season came in 1996 with the Jacksonville Jaguars when he recorded 17 catches for 141 yards. In 1997, he caught eight passes for 84 yards and one touchdown. In 1998, Brown joined the Oakland Raiders, with whom he started four games and recorded seven catches for 89 yards.In 1999 he signed with the Arizona Cardinals. He played there for 2 years, ending his career in 2000 after playing for 9 years.
