= Josh Dye =

American baseball player (born 1996)

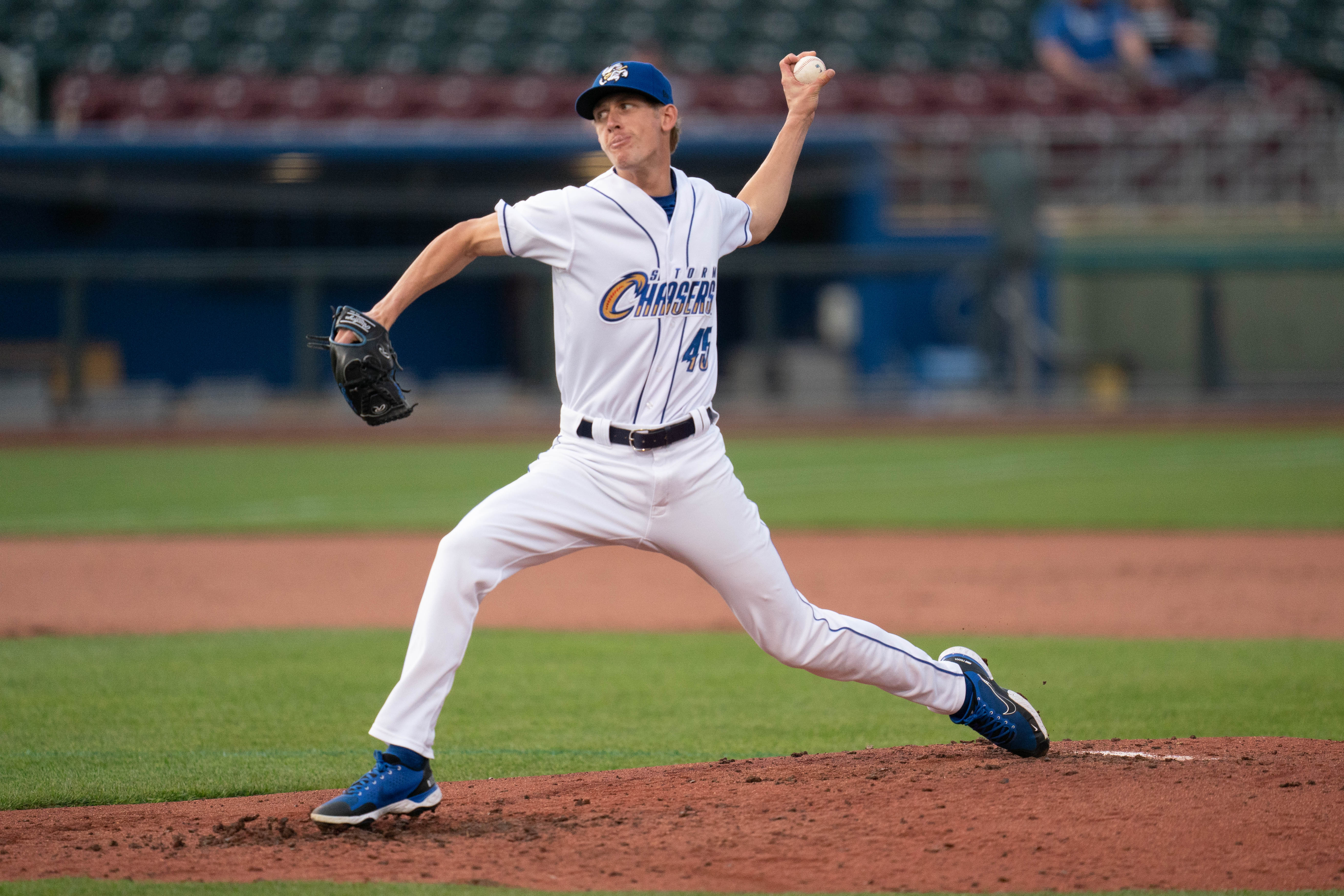
- Dye with the Omaha Storm Chasers in 2022
- Pitcher
- Born: September 14, 1996 (age 30); DeLand, Florida, U.S.
- Bats: Left Throws: Left

Joshua Dye (born September 14, 1996) is an American former professional baseball pitcher.

== Amateur career ==
Dye attended DeLand High School in DeLand, Florida, where he helps guide the Bulldogs to the Class 8A semifinals as a senior in 2014. He went unselected in the 2014 Major League Baseball draft and enrolled at Florida Gulf Coast University where he played college baseball. He underwent elbow surgery after his freshman year in 2015, where he posted a 3.70 ERA over 41 1/3 innings. After not pitching in 2016, he returned from the injury in 2017, starting 16 games and going 8–5 with a 3.23 ERA and 76 strikeouts over 94 2/3 innings. For the 2018 season, he started 14 games and went 8–4 with a 2.40 ERA. Following the season's end, he was selected by the Kansas City Royals in the 23rd round of the 2018 Major League Baseball draft.

== Professional career ==
=== Kansas City Royals ===
Dye signed with the Royals for $60,000, and made his professional debut with the rookie–level Burlington Royals before he was promoted to the High–A Wilmington Blue Rocks. Over 12 games (eight starts) between the two teams, he went 2–3 with a 4.20 ERA and 40 strikeouts over 40 2/3 innings. Dye split the 2019 season between the Single–A Lexington Legends and Wilmington and went 5–3 with a 2.15 ERA and 81 strikeouts over 62 2/3 innings pitched in relief. He did not play in a game in 2020 due to the cancellation of the minor league season because of the COVID-19 pandemic. He split the 2021 season between the Double–A Northwest Arkansas Naturals and Triple–A Omaha Storm Chasers, making 40 relief appearances and compiling a 4–2 record, a 2.60 ERA, and 73 strikeouts over 65 2/3 innings between the two teams. He returned to Omaha for the 2022 season. Over 48 games (six starts), he went 5–3 with a 4.48 ERA and 58 strikeouts over 62 1/3 innings.

Dye began the 2023 season with Triple-A Omaha, and had a 1.80 ERA across three relief appearances before he was released on May 2.

=== Texas Rangers ===
On May 11, 2023, Dye signed a minor league contract with the Texas Rangers organization and was assigned to the Triple-A Round Rock Express. In seven appearances for Round Rock, he posted a 7.50 ERA with five strikeouts across 12 innings pitched. Dye elected free agency following the season on November 6.
