= Reid Schaller =

American baseball player (born 1997)

Free agent
- Pitcher
- Born: April 2, 1997 (age 29); Indianapolis, Indiana, U.S.
- Bats: Right Throws: Right
- Stats at Baseball Reference

Roland Reid Schaller (born April 2, 1997) is an American professional baseball pitcher who is a free agent.

== Career ==
As a redshirt freshman at Vanderbilt University, Schaller was draft-eligible in 2018. The Washington Nationals selected him in the third round (101st overall) of the 2018 Major League Baseball draft, also taking his Commodore teammate, Chandler Day, in the seventh round. Schaller signed with Washington and made his professional debut with the Low-A Auburn Doubledays. In 12 starts split between Auburn and the rookie-level Gulf Coast League Nationals, he accumulated an aggregate 2–3 record and 4.65 ERA with 32 strikeouts across 40 2/3 innings pitched. Slowed by an injury, Schaller progressed in 2019, pitching in the rotation for the Single-A Hagerstown Suns, where he posted a 4–3 record and 3.29 ERA with 47 strikeouts over 12 starts.

Schaller did not play in a game in 2020 due to the cancellation of the minor league season because of the COVID-19 pandemic. Schaller appeared at the Nationals' instructional league in Florida later that year. He made his 2021 debut out of the bullpen with the High-A Wilmington Blue Rocks, to which he was assigned along with several other top Nationals prospects. In 33 appearances out of the bullpen split between Wilmington and the Double-A Harrisburg Senators, Schaller compiled a 2–4 record and 4.06 ERA with 48 strikeouts and four saves across 44 1/3 innings pitched.

Schaller returned to Harrisburg for the 2022 season, posting a 4–7 record and 5.70 ERA with 47 strikeouts and three saves in 42 2/3 innings pitched across 38 relief outings. He made 32 appearances for Harrisburg in 2023, compiling a 1–4 record and 3.83 ERA with 57 strikeouts and one save over 47 innings of work.

Schaller was placed on the 60-day injured list prior to the beginning of the 2024 season, ultimately missing the entirety of the year. He elected free agency following the season on November 4, 2024.

== Pitching style ==
Schaller's primary pitch is a fastball that has hit 97 miles per hour (156 km/h) in relief appearances. He offsets it with a slider and a nascent changeup.
