= Darryl Spencer =

American football player (born 1970)

No. 84
- Position: Wide receiver

Personal information
- Born: March 21, 1970 (age 56); Merritt Island, Florida, U.S.
- Listed height: 5 ft 8 in (1.73 m)
- Listed weight: 172 lb (78 kg)

Career information
- High school: Merritt Island
- College: Miami (FL)
- NFL draft: 1993: undrafted

Career history
- Atlanta Falcons (1993–1995)

Career NFL statistics
- Receptions: 7
- Receiving yards: 111
- Stats at Pro Football Reference

Darryl Eugene Spencer (born March 21, 1970) is an American former professional football player who was a wide receiver for the Atlanta Falcons of the National Football League (NFL). He played college football for the Miami Hurricanes. Darryl Spencer now resides in Palm Bay, Fl and is a supervisor at United Parcel Service (UPS).
