= Mason Denaburg =

American baseball player (born 1999)

- Pitcher
- Born: August 8, 1999 (age 27); Cape Canaveral, Florida, U.S.
- Bats: Right Throws: Right
Medals
Men's baseball
Representing United States
U-18 Baseball World Cup
Gold medal – first place	2017 Thunder Bay	Team

Mason Alan Denaburg (born August 8, 1999) is an American former professional baseball pitcher and current punter for the UCF Knights. He was drafted by the Washington Nationals in the 1st round of the 2018 MLB draft.

== Baseball career ==
=== Amateur ===
Denaburg attended Merritt Island High School in Merritt Island, Florida. As a senior, he pitched to a 0.99 ERA in 35 1/3 innings along with batting .410 with five home runs and 21 RBIs. He committed to play college baseball at the University of Florida.

=== Washington Nationals ===
Denaburg was drafted 27th overall by the Washington Nationals in the 2018 Major League Baseball draft. He signed with the organization on July 3. Denaburg did not appear in a game during the 2018 season, and made his professional debut for the rookie-level Gulf Coast League Nationals on June 24, 2019. Over 20 1/3 innings, he pitched to a 7.52 ERA, walking 14 while striking out 19. Denaburg did not play in a game in 2020 due to the cancellation of the minor league season because of the COVID-19 pandemic.

On April 4, 2021, it was announced that Denaburg had undergone Tommy John surgery and would miss the entirety of the 2021 season. Denaburg returned to action in 2022, and spent the next two seasons with the Single-A Fredericksburg Nationals. He posted a 4.15 ERA with 38 strikeouts over 13 starts in 2022, and struggled to an 11.64 ERA with 33 strikeouts across 28 games in 2023.

Denaburg split 2024 between Fredericksburg and the High-A Wilmington Blue Rocks, accumulating a 6-3 record and 4.38 ERA with 49 strikeouts in 61 2/3 innings pitched across 40 appearances out of the bullpen. He elected free agency following the season on November 4, 2024.

== Football career ==
Mason Denaburg
UCF Knights
- Position: Punter
- Class: Freshman

Personal information
- Born: August 8, 1999 (age 27); Cape Canaveral, Florida, U.S.
- Listed height: 6 ft 4 in (1.93 m)
- Listed weight: 195 lb (88 kg)

Career information
- High school: Merritt Island (Merritt Island, Florida)
- College: UCF (2025–present)

On May 8, 2025, Denaburg announced his retirement from professional baseball; he subsequently announced that he would be joining the University of Central Florida football team as a punter.
