= Roncalli High School (Indiana) =

Location
- 3300 Prague Road; Indianapolis, Indiana 46227; United States; 39°41′25″N 86°06′29″W

Information
- Type: Private, Coeducational
- Religious affiliation: Roman Catholic
- Established: 1969
- Oversight: Archdiocese of Indianapolis
- President: Chuck Weisenbach
- Principal: Kevin Banich
- Chaplain: Douglas Hunter
- Teaching staff: 75 (FTE)
- Grades: 9–12
- Enrollment: 1,082 (2023–24)
- Color
- Athletics conference: Circle City Conference
- Nickname: Royals
- Tuition: $10,000
- Website: www.roncalli.org

Roncalli High School is a Catholic high school located in Indianapolis, Indiana, United States. It is located on the south side of Indianapolis and run by Archdiocese of Indianapolis. Roncalli is named for Pope John XXIII, Angelo Giuseppe Roncalli.

== Athletics ==
Team State Championships (25):

- Football (10): 1985, 1988, 1993, 1994, 1999, 2002, 2003, 2004, 2016, 2020
- Girls' Volleyball (4): 1981, 1998, 2006, 2024, 2025
- Softball (5): 1999, 2001, 2011, 2021, 2022
- Baseball (1): 2016
- Boys' Volleyball (5): 2018, 2022, 2023, 2024, 2025

Individual State Championships (14):

- Wrestling
  - 106 Weight Class (1): 2024
  - 113 Weight Class (1): 2017
  - 126 Weight Class (1): 2020
  - 145 Weight Class (2): 1976, 2020
  - 152 Weight Class (1): 2023
  - 167 Weight Class (1): 1985
  - 185 Weight Class (1): 1980
- Boys' Tennis
  - Singles (1): 1991
- Boys' Swimming and Diving
  - 50 Yard Freestyle (1): 2002
- Girls' Track & Field
  - Shot Put (1): 2004
  - Long Jump (1): 2017
- Gymnastics
  - Beam (1): 2010
  - All-Around (1): 2010

== Notable alumni ==
- Jordan Donica - Broadway stage actor and Tony Award nominee
- Jim Gibbons - Former CEO of Goodwill Industries
- Perry Kitchen - Former soccer player for the Columbus Crew, LA Galaxy, Randers, Heart of Midlothian, D.C. United and Chicago Fire Premier.
- Trevor Lauck - college football offensive tackle for the Iowa Hawkeyes
- Nate Lawrie - Former NFL Tight End for Tampa Bay Buccaneers, New Orleans Saints, and Cincinnati Bengals and 2004 NFL draft selection.
- Dick Nalley - Olympic bobsledder in 1980 Winter Olympics
- Logan Neidlinger - Pro soccer player in the USL Championship
- Kyle O'Gara - Former Indy Lights driver
- Michael A. Perry - is an American Franciscan friar who is a former General Minister of the Order of Friars Minor.
- Jim Prestel - Former NFL defensive lineman (1960–67), class of 1955 (SHHS)
- Keagan Rothrock - Softball player for Florida
- Nick Schnell - Current outfielder in the Washington Nationals
- Cole Toner - Former NFL offensive guard for Los Angeles Chargers and 2016 NFL draft selection by the Arizona Cardinals

== See also ==
- List of schools in Indianapolis
- List of high schools in Indiana
