= Merritt Island High School =

Public high school in Merritt Island, Florida, United States

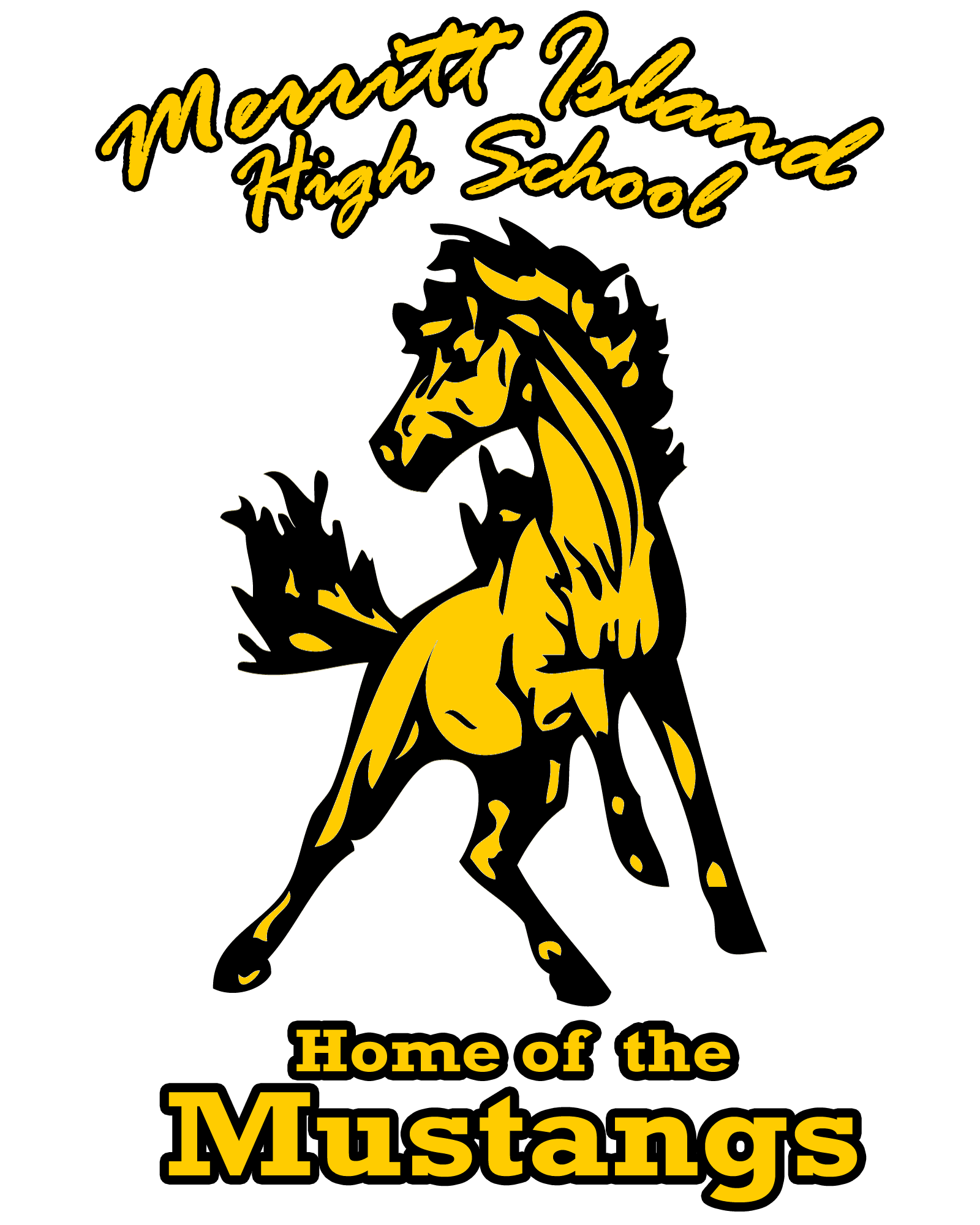

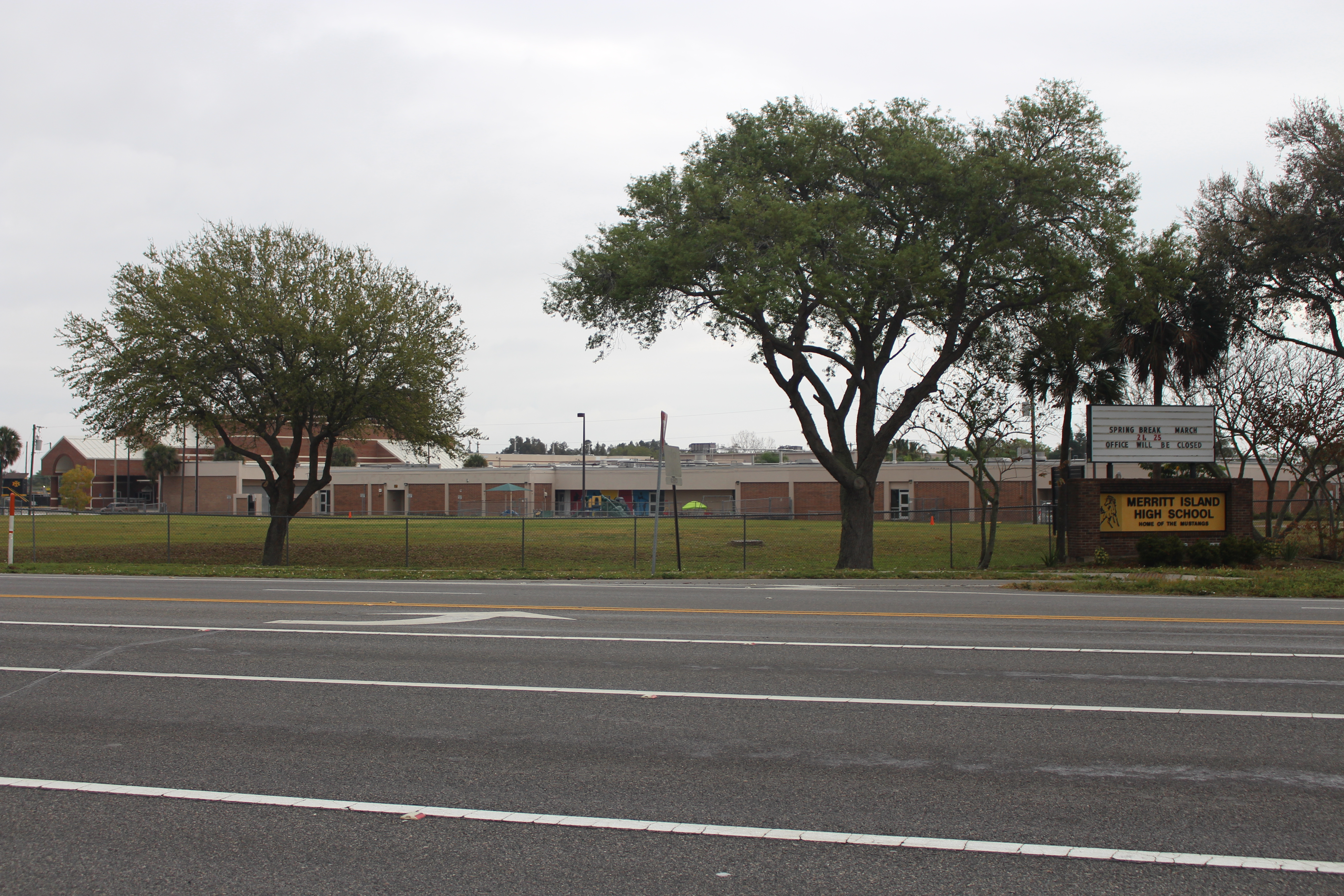

Location
- 100 East Mustang Way; Merritt Island, Florida; United States; 28.3772271°N 80.6986643°W

Information
- Type: Public
- Motto: Once a Mustang, Always a Mustang, Pride Tradition Family
- Established: 1965
- School district: Brevard Public Schools
- Principal: Debbie Lubbers
- Teaching staff: 72.50 (on an FTE basis)
- Grades: 9-12
- Student to teacher ratio: 20.46
- Colors: Black and Gold
- Song: The Horse
- Mascot: Mustang
- Nickname: Merritt Island, MIHS
- Website: www.brevardschools.org/MerrittIslandHS

Merritt Island High School is a public high school located in Merritt Island, Florida. It was built in 1965.

== Principals ==
1. Robert Bruton: 1965 - 1983
2. Hank Smith: 1983 - 1999
3. David M. Piccolo: 2000 - 2002
4. Gary Shiffrin: 2002 - 2013
5. Dr. Karyle Green: 2013 - 2014
6. Mollie Vega: 2014 - 2018
7. James Rehmer: 2018–2023
8. Debbie Lubbers: 2023–present

== Academics ==
Merritt Island High School is accredited. The school offers classes for grades 9-12, including Honors courses, Advanced Placement courses, and courses with the Dual Enrollment program at Eastern Florida State College.

To graduate, students must earn a minimum of 26 credits. Each semester-course is equal to a half credit. There is also a variety of academies available for students to enroll in. Including the Advance Placement academy, Fame academy for the performing arts, and Davinci.

== Athletics ==
=== Teams ===
- Wrestling
- Basketball
- Bowling
- Cheerleading
- Cross country
- Dance Team
- Football
- Golf
- Lacrosse
- Soccer
- Softball
- Swim and Diving
- Tennis
- Track
- Indoor Volleyball
- Beach Volleyball
- Baseball

=== State championships ===
- Boys Soccer 4A championship - 2009. 3A championship - 2014.
- Girls Soccer 4A championship - 2010. 3A championship - 2017 and 2018.
- American football 4A championship - 1972, 1978 & 1979.
- Baseball 5A championship - 1999 & 2000.
- Volleyball 5A championship- 2011 & 2018
- Beach Volleyball AA championship - 2019

== Clubs and extracurricular activities ==
Extracurricular activities offered include:

- Academic Games team
- Art club
- Anime club
- Auto club
- Book club
- Beta Club
- Chess club
- Marine Science Club
- Chorus
- Chamber Orchestra, Symphonic Orchestra, Concert Orchestra, & Beginning Orchestra
- DECA
- Drama/Theater
- Earth club
- Ethics club
- Fellowship of Christian Athletes
- FIRST Robotics Competition team
- Future Business Leaders of America
- Future Educators of America
- Future Problem Solvers
- Gay Straight Alliance
- German club
- Guitar Club
- Inline hockey team
- Intramural athletics
- Jazz ensemble
- JROTC (including the Raider Team, Rifle Team, Drill Team, Color Guard and Command and Staff leadership positions)
- Key Club
- Literary magazine
- Magic club
- Marching, Concert and Symphonic Bands
- Marine Science Club
- Multicultural club
- Mustang Round-Up Leaders
- Straight Up G (vocal acapella group)
- National Art Honor Society
- National Honor Society
- Newspaper
- Quiz bowl team
- Rugby team
- Science Research
- SECME
- Spanish club
- Spanish National Honor Society
- Speech and debate club
- Student ministers
- Student council
- StangSat Club
- Student Government
- Student Venture
- Yearbook
- Video Game club
- DND (Dungeons and Dragons) club
- Welcoming diversity team
- Young Republicans Club
- Young Democrats Club

== Notable alumni ==
- Leon "Pop" Bright 1974 – professional football player
- Derek Brown 1988 – professional football player
- Mason Denaburg 2018 – Punter for UCF and former baseball pitcher
- Cal Dixon 1987 – professional football player
- Joe Gayton 1974 - writer of television and film
- Tony Gayton 1977 – film producer
- Derrick Ham 1995 – Professional football player
- Clint Hurdle 1975 – Professional baseball player and manager
- Mathew Martoma 1992 – former S.A.C. Capital Advisors trader, convicted of insider trading
- Bubba McDowell 1984 – professional football player and current head coach for the Prairie View A&M Panthers football team
- Will Perdue 1983 – professional basketball player and television sports announcer
- Darryl Spencer 1988 – professional football player
- Danny Verpaele 2004 – professional football player and current defensive coordinator for the Kennesaw State Owls football team
- Kevin Whitaker 1975 – US ambassador to Colombia
- Jeff Wickersham – professional football player

== See also ==
- Brevard Public Schools
