= 1929 Campeonato de Portugal final =

- Event: 1928–29 Campeonato de Portugal
Belenenses	União de Lisboa
2	1
- Date: 16 June 1929
- Venue: Campo de Palhavã, Lisbon
- Referee: Carlos Canuto (Lisbon)

The 1929 Campeonato de Portugal Final was the final match of the 1928–29 Campeonato de Portugal, the 8th season of the Campeonato de Portugal, the Portuguese football knockout tournament, organized by the Portuguese Football Federation (FPF). The match was played on 16 June 1929 at the Campo de Palhavã in Lisbon between Belenenses and União de Lisboa. Belenenses defeated União de Lisboa 2–1 to claim their second Campeonato de Portugal.

== Match ==
=== Details ===
16 June 1929

Belenenses	2–1	União de Lisboa
José Luís 15', 73'		L. Silva 70'

Campo de Palhavã, Lisbon
Referee: Carlos Canuto (Lisbon)

Belenenses	União de Lisboa

GK	(Portugal) João Tomás
DF	(Portugal) Júlio Morais
DF	(Portugal) João Belo
MF	(Portugal) Carlos Rodrigues
MF	(Portugal) Joaquim d’Almeida
MF	(Portugal) Augusto Silva
FW	(Portugal) José Luís
FW	(Portugal) Rodolfo Faroleiro
FW	(Portugal) Silva Marques
FW	(Portugal) Alfredo Ramos
FW	(Portugal) Pepe
Substitutes:
Manager:
(Portugal) Artur José Pereira

GK	(Portugal) Carlos Silva
DF	(Portugal) Manuel da Silva I
DF	(Portugal) Constante Santos
DF	(Portugal) José da Silva
DF	(Portugal) Jaime Rodrigues
MF	(Portugal) Manuel Martinho
MF	(Portugal) Liberto dos Santos
FW	(Portugal) Valentim Machado
FW	(Portugal) Luís Silva
FW	(Portugal) Manuel Ramos
FW	(Portugal) Armando Silva
Substitutes:
Manager:

1928–29 Campeonato de Portugal Winners
Belenenses
1st Title

Match officials

- Assistant referees:
- Fourth official:

Match rules

- 90 minutes.
