= Carlos Rodríguez =

Carlos Rodríguez may refer to:

- Carlos A. Rodriguez (born 1965), Cuban-born American business executive
- Carlos Alfredo Rodríguez (born 1947), Argentine economist
- Carlos Manuel Rodríguez Santiago (1918–1963), beatified Puerto Rican Roman Catholic layman
- Carlos Rodríguez Braun (born 1948), Argentine academic
- Carlos Páez Rodríguez (born 1953), Andes plane crash survivor

== Entertainment ==
- Carlos Rodríguez Cárdenas (born 1962), Cuban artist
- Carlos Rodríguez (film director) (born 1966), Spanish film director
- Carlos Rodríguez (musician) (born 1972), Argentine singer

== Politics ==
- Carlos Rodríguez Erdoíza (1782–1839), Chilean lawyer and independence activist
- Carlos Rafael Rodríguez (1913–1997), Cuban politician
- Carlos Rodriguez (CUT), president of the Central Union of Workers, Colombia
- Carlos Rodríguez Mateo (born 1965), Puerto Rican politician and former mayor of Salinas
- Carlos Rodríguez Guevara (born 1969), Mexican politician from Guanajuato
- Carlos Sosa Rodríguez (1912–1997), Venezuelan jurist and diplomat, president of the United Nations General Assembly in 1963

== Sports ==
=== Association football ===
- Carlos Rodríguez (footballer, born 1980), Spanish football midfielder
- Carlos Gerardo Rodríguez (born 1985), Mexican football manager and former left-back
- Carlos Rodríguez (footballer, born 1988), Spanish football forward
- Carlos Felipe Rodríguez (born 1989), Mexican football goalkeeper
- Carlos Rodríguez (Argentine footballer) (born 1990), Argentine football midfielder
- Carlos Rodríguez (Uruguayan footballer) (born 1990), Uruguayan football defender for Barcelona SC
- Carlos Rodríguez (Panamanian footballer) (born 1990), Panamanian football left-back
- Carlos Rodríguez (footballer, born 1994), Mexican football forward
- Carlos Rodríguez (Chilean footballer) (born 1995), Chilean football forward
- Carlos Rodríguez (Colombian footballer) (born 1995), Colombian football midfielder for Unión Magdalena
- Carlos Rodríguez (footballer, born 1996), Mexican football defender
- Carlos Rodríguez (footballer, born 1997), Mexican football midfielder for Cruz Azul
- Carlos Eduardo Rodríguez (footballer) (born 2000), Venezuelan football midfielder
- Carlos Andrés Rodríguez, player for Ecuador at the 2007 South American U-20 Championship

=== Other sports ===
- Carlos Rodríguez (infielder) (born 1967), Mexican baseball player
- Carlos Rodríguez (pitcher, born 2001) (born 2001), Nicaraguan baseball player
- Carlos Rodríguez (outfielder) (born 2000), Venezuelan baseball player
- Petaca Rodríguez, (1915–1990), Colombian baseball player
- Carlos Rodríguez (boxer) (born 1939), Venezuelan Olympic boxer
- Carlos Rodríguez (cyclist) (born 2001), Spanish road cyclist
- Carlos Rodríguez (darts player) (born 1979), Spanish darts player
- Carlos Rodríguez (fencer) (born 1978), Venezuelan fencer
- Carlos Rodríguez (sport shooter) (1909–1986), Mexican Olympic shooter
- Carlos Rodríguez (tennis coach), Argentinian-Belgian tennis coach
- Carlos Rodríguez Lafora (1884–1966), Spanish chess player

== See also ==
- Carlos Rodrigues (disambiguation)
- Carlos Rodriguez, fictional character from Nightmare on Elm Street franchise
