= 2020 Minnesota Twins season =

2020 Minnesota Twins
- American League Central champions
- League: American League
- Division: Central
- Ballpark: Target Field
- City: Minneapolis, Minnesota
- Record: 36–24 (.600)
- Divisional place: 1st
- Owners: Jim Pohlad
- President of baseball operations: Derek Falvey
- General managers: Thad Levine
- Managers: Rocco Baldelli
- Television: Fox Sports North (Dick Bremer, Bert Blyleven, Justin Morneau) (Marney Gellner) (Audra Martin)
- Radio: WCCO, KMNB (Cory Provus, Dan Gladden)
- Stats: ESPN.com; Baseball Reference

The 2020 Minnesota Twins season was the 60th season for the Minnesota Twins franchise in the Twin Cities of Minnesota, their 11th season at Target Field and the 120th overall in the American League. It was the team's second year under manager Rocco Baldelli.

On March 12, 2020, MLB announced that because of the ongoing COVID-19 pandemic, the start of the regular season would be delayed by at least two weeks in addition to the remainder of spring training being cancelled. Four days later, it was announced that the start of the season would be pushed back indefinitely due to the recommendation made by the CDC to restrict events of more than 50 people for eight weeks. On June 23, Commissioner Rob Manfred unilaterally implemented a 60-game season. Players reported to training camps on July 1 in order to resume spring training and prepare for a July 24 Opening Day. On the last day of the shortened 2020 season, the Twins clinched the American League Central division title for the second year in a row thanks to a loss by the Chicago White Sox. On September 29, the Twins lost Game One of the ALWCS to the Houston Astros. The game was their seventeenth consecutive postseason loss, which broke the record for the longest postseason losing streak in North American sports, passing the 1975–79 Chicago Blackhawks. The Twins were ultimately swept two games to zero in the best-of-three series, extending their record-breaking losing streak to eighteen games.

== Season standings ==
AL Central
Team	W	L	Pct.	GB	Home	Road
Minnesota Twins	36	24	.600	—	24‍–‍7	12‍–‍17
Cleveland Indians	35	25	.583	1	18‍–‍12	17‍–‍13
Chicago White Sox	35	25	.583	1	18‍–‍12	17‍–‍13
Kansas City Royals	26	34	.433	10	15‍–‍15	11‍–‍19
Detroit Tigers	23	35	.397	12	12‍–‍15	11‍–‍20

Division leaders
Team	W	L	Pct.
Tampa Bay Rays	40	20	.667
Oakland Athletics	36	24	.600
Minnesota Twins	36	24	.600

Division 2nd place
Team	W	L	Pct.
Cleveland Indians	35	25	.583
New York Yankees	33	27	.550
Houston Astros	29	31	.483

Wild Card teams (Top 2 teams qualify for postseason)
Team	W	L	Pct.	GB
Chicago White Sox	35	25	.583	+3
Toronto Blue Jays	32	28	.533	—
Seattle Mariners	27	33	.450	5
Los Angeles Angels	26	34	.433	6
Kansas City Royals	26	34	.433	6
Baltimore Orioles	25	35	.417	7
Boston Red Sox	24	36	.400	8
Detroit Tigers	23	35	.397	8
Texas Rangers	22	38	.367	10

== Records vs. opponents ==
2020 American League record Source: MLB Standings Grid – 2020
Team	CWS	CLE	DET	KC	MIN	NL
Chicago	—	2–8	9–1	9–1	5–5	10–10
Cleveland	8–2	—	7–3	5–5	3–7	12–8
Detroit	1–9	3–7	—	4–6	4–6	11–7
Kansas City	1–9	5–5	6–4	—	5–5	9–11
Minnesota	5–5	7–3	6–4	5–5	—	13–7

== Game log ==
=== Regular season ===
2020 game log: 36–24 (Home: 24–7; Away: 12–17)
July: 5–2 (Home: 3–1; Away: 2–1)

#	Date	Opponent	Score	Win	Loss	Save	Record	Streak
1	July 24	@ White Sox	10–5	**May** (1–0)	Giolito (0–1)	—	1–0	W1
2	July 25	@ White Sox	3–10	Keuchel (1–0)	**Dobnak** (0–1)	—	1–1	L1
3	July 26	@ White Sox	14–2	**Maeda** (1–0)	López (0–1)	—	2–1	W1
4	July 28	Cardinals	6–3	**Bailey** (1–0)	Martínez (0–1)	**Romo** (1)	3–1	W2
5	July 29	Cardinals	3–0	**Hill** (1–0)	Ponce de Leon (0–1)	**Rogers** (1)	4–1	W3
6	July 30	Indians	0–2	Bieber (2–0)	**Berríos** (0–1)	Karinchak (1)	4–2	L1
7	July 31	Indians	4–1	**Dobnak** (1–1)	Clevinger (0–1)	**Rogers** (2)	5–2	W1

August: 15–14 (Home: 9–3; Away: 6–11)

#	Date	Opponent	Score	Win	Loss	Save	Record	Streak
8	August 1	Indians	3–0	**Maeda** (2–0)	Carrasco (1–1)	**Rogers** (3)	6–2	W2
9	August 2	Indians	3–1	**Smeltzer** (1–0)	Civale (1–1)	**Romo** (2)	7–2	W3
10	August 3	Pirates	5–4	**Rogers** (1–0)	Burdi (0–1)	—	8–2	W4
11	August 4	Pirates	7–3	**Berríos** (1–1)	Musgrove (0–3)	**May** (1)	9–2	W5
12	August 5	@ Pirates	5–2	**Dobnak** (2–1)	Williams (0–3)	—	10–2	W6
13	August 6	@ Pirates	5–6	Howard (1–0)	**Rogers** (1–1)	—	10–3	L1
14	August 7	@ Royals	2–3	Holland (2–0)	**Wisler** (0–1)	Rosenthal (2)	10–4	L2
15	August 8	@ Royals	6–9	Zuber (1–1)	**Thorpe** (0–1)	Rosenthal (3)	10–5	L3
16	August 9	@ Royals	2–4	Singer (1–1)	**Berríos** (1–2)	Barlow (1)	10–6	L4
17	August 10	@ Brewers	4–2	**Dobnak** (3–1)	Houser (1–1)	**Rogers** (4)	11–6	W1
18	August 11	@ Brewers	4–6	Williams (1–1)	**Rogers** (1–2)	Hader (3)	11–7	L1
19	August 12	@ Brewers	12–2	**Maeda** (3–0)	Lauer (0–2)	—	12–7	W1
20	August 15 (1)	Royals	4–2 (7)	**Duffey** (1–0)	Speier (0–1)	**Rogers** (5)	13–7	W2
21	August 15 (2)	Royals	2–4 (7)	Duffy (1–2)	**Berríos** (1–3)	Rosenthal (5)	13–8	L1
22	August 16	Royals	4–2	**Dobnak** (4–1)	Singer (1–2)	**Romo** (3)	14–8	W1
23	August 17	Royals	4–1	**Smeltzer** (2–0)	Bubic (0–3)	—	15–8	W2
24	August 18	Brewers	4–3 (12)	**Alcalá** (1–0)	Phelps (2–2)	—	16–8	W3
25	August 19	Brewers	3–9	Anderson (1–2)	**Hill** (1–1)	—	16–9	L1
26	August 20	Brewers	7–1	**Berríos** (2–3)	Woodruff (1–2)	—	17–9	W1
27	August 21	@ Royals	2–7	Duffy (2–2)	**Odorizzi** (0–1)	—	17–10	L1
28	August 22	@ Royals	7–2	**Dobnak** (5–1)	Singer (1–3)	—	18–10	W1
29	August 23	@ Royals	5–4	**Clippard** (1–0)	Bubic (0–4)	**Rogers** (6)	19–10	W2
30	August 24	@ Indians	3–2	**Maeda** (4–0)	Civale (3–3)	**Rogers** (7)	20–10	W3
31	August 25	@ Indians	2–4	Bieber (6–0)	**Alcalá** (1–1)	Hand (8)	20–11	L1
32	August 26	@ Indians	3–6	Maton (2–0)	**Romo** (0–1)	Hand (9)	20–12	L2
—	August 27	@ Tigers	Postponed (strikes due to shooting of Jacob Blake); Rescheduled to August 28					
—	August 28 (1)	@ Tigers	Postponed (rain); Rescheduled to August 29					
—	August 28 (2)	@ Tigers	Postponed (rain); Rescheduled to September 4					
33	August 29 (1)	@ Tigers	2–8 (7)	Boyd (1–4)	**Dobnak** (5–2)	—	20–13	L3
34	August 29 (2)	@ Tigers	2–4 (7)	Skubal (1–1)	**Duffey** (1–1)	Soto (1)	20–14	L4
35	August 30	@ Tigers	2–3	Alexander (2–1)	**Maeda** (4–1)	Soto (2)	20–15	L5
36	August 31	White Sox	5–8	Foster (4–0)	**Rogers** (1–3)	Colomé (7)	20–16	L6

September: 16–8 (Home: 12–3; Away: 4–5)

#	Date	Opponent	Score	Win	Loss	Save	Record	Streak
37	September 1	White Sox	3–2	**Thielbar** (1–0)	Cordero (0–2)	**Wisler** (1)	21–16	W1
38	September 2	White Sox	8–1	**Berríos** (3–3)	López (0–2)	—	22–16	W2
39	September 4 (1)	Tigers	2–0 (7)	**Dobnak** (6–2)	Boyd (1–5)	**Rogers** (8)	23–16	W3
40	September 4 (2)	Tigers ^{[a]}	3–2 (8)	**Romo** (1–1)	Jiménez (1–3)	**May** (2)	24–16	W4
41	September 5	Tigers	4–3	**Alcalá** (2–1)	Cisnero (1–2)	—	25–16	W5
42	September 6	Tigers	8–10	Funkhouser (1–1)	**Romo** (1–2)	Garcia (1)	25–17	L1
43	September 7	Tigers	6–2	**Pineda** (1–0)	Fulmer (0–1)	—	26–17	W1
44	September 8 (1)	@ Cardinals	7–3 (7)	**Berríos** (4–3)	Martínez (0–2)	—	27–17	W2
45	September 8 (2)	@ Cardinals	4–6 (7)	Cabrera (3–1)	**Dobnak** (6–3)	Gallegos (4)	27–18	L1
46	September 11	Indians	3–1	**Maeda** (5–1)	Bieber (7–1)	**Rogers** (9)	28–18	W1
47	September 12	Indians	8–4	**Hill** (2–1)	Plesac (3–2)	—	29–18	W2
48	September 13	Indians	7–5	**Thielbar** (2–0)	McKenzie (2–1)	**Romo** (4)	30–18	W3
49	September 14	@ White Sox	1–3	Colomé (2–0)	**Rogers** (1–4)	—	30–19	L1
50	September 15	@ White Sox	2–6	Dunning (2–0)	**Dobnak** (6–4)	—	30–20	L2
51	September 16	@ White Sox	5–1	**Stashak** (1–0)	Giolito (4–3)	—	31–20	W1
52	September 17	@ White Sox	3–4	Heuer (3–0)	**Clippard** (1–1)	Colomé (12)	31–21	L1
53	September 18	@ Cubs	0–1	Hendricks (6–4)	**Hill** (2–2)	Jeffress (8)	31–22	L2
54	September 19	@ Cubs	8–1	**Pineda** (2–0)	Mills (5–4)	—	32–22	W1
55	September 20	@ Cubs	4–0	**Berríos** (5–3)	Darvish (7–3)	—	33–22	W2
56	September 22	Tigers	5–4 (10)	**Rogers** (2–4)	Garcia (2–1)	—	34–22	W3
57	September 23	Tigers	7–6	**Maeda** (6–1)	Mize (0–3)	—	35–22	W4
58	September 25	Reds	2–7	Lorenzen (3–1)	**Berríos** (5–4)	—	35–23	L1
59	September 26	Reds	7–3	**Clippard** (2–1)	Castillo (4–6)	—	36–23	W1
60	September 27	Reds	3–5	Iglesias (4–3)	**Thielbar** (2–1)	—	36–24	L1

Legend: = Win = Loss = Postponement
Bold = Twins team member

Notes:

- **^{a}** The Tigers are designated the home team for the makeup game from August 28.

=== Postseason ===
2020 Postseason: 0–2 (Home 0–2; Away 0–0)
American League Wild Card Series: 0−2 (Home 0–2; Away 0–0)

#	Date	Opponent	Score	Win	Loss	Save	Record	Streak
1	September 29	Astros	1–4	Valdez (1–0)	**Romo** (0–1)	—	0–1	L1
2	September 30	Astros	1–3	Javier (1–0)	**Stashak** (0–2)	Pressly (1)	0–2	L2

== Postseason rosters ==
Playoff rosters
American League Wild Card Series

- Pitchers: 12 Jake Odorizzi 17 José Berríos 18 Kenta Maeda 21 Tyler Duffey 35 Michael Pineda 36 Tyler Clippard 37 Matt Wisler 54 Sergio Romo 55 Taylor Rogers 61 Cody Stashak 65 Trevor May 68 Randy Dobnak 72 Caleb Thielbar
- Catchers: 8 Mitch Garver 16 Alex Avila 39 Ryan Jeffers 64 Willians Astudillo
- Infielders: 2 Luis Arráez 9 Marwin González 11 Jorge Polanco 13 Ehire Adrianza 22 Miguel Sanó
- Outfielders: 20 Eddie Rosario 25 Byron Buxton 26 Max Kepler 76 Alex Kirilloff
- Designated hitters: 23 Nelson Cruz

== Roster ==
2020 Minnesota Twins
Roster
Pitchers: 66 Jorge Alcalá; 15 Homer Bailey; 17 José Berríos; 36 Tyler Clippard; 86 Edwar Colina; 53 Danny Coulombe; 68 Randy Dobnak; 21 Tyler Duffey; 38 Cory Gearrin; 44 Rich Hill; 52 Zack Littell; 18 Kenta Maeda; 65 Trevor May; 12 Jake Odorizzi; 35 Michael Pineda; 71 Sean Poppen; 55 Taylor Rogers; 54 Sergio Romo; 31 Devin Smeltzer; 61 Cody Stashak; 72 Caleb Thielbar; 43 Lewis Thorpe; 37 Matt Wisler	Catchers: 64 Willians Astudillo; 16 Alex Avila; 8 Mitch Garver; 39 Ryan Jeffers; Infielders: 13 Ehire Adrianza; 2 Luis Arráez; 74 Travis Blankenhorn; 24 Josh Donaldson; 9 Marwin González; 11 Jorge Polanco; 22 Miguel Sanó; 4 Ildemaro Vargas	Outfielders: 25 Byron Buxton; 60 Jake Cave; 26 Max Kepler; 50 Brent Rooker; 20 Eddie Rosario; 30 LaMonte Wade Jr.; 58 Aaron Whitefield; Other batters: 23 Nelson Cruz	Manager: 5 Rocco Baldelli; Coaches: 27 Mike Bell (bench); 75 Nate Dammann (quality control); 46 Tony Diaz (third base); 67 Bill Evers (catching); 63 Rudy Hernandez (assistant hitting); 47 Wes Johnson (pitching); 97 Garrett Kennedy (bullpen catcher); 33 Bob McClure (bullpen); 98 Connor Olson (bullpen catcher); 84 Edgar Varela (hitting); 40 Tommy Watkins (first base)

== Player stats ==
=== Batting ===
Note: G = Games played; AB = At bats; R = Runs; H = Hits; 2B = Doubles; 3B = Triples; HR = Home runs; RBI = Runs batted in; SB = Stolen bases; BB = Walks; AVG = Batting average; SLG = Slugging average

Player	G	AB	R	H	2B	3B	HR	RBI	SB	BB	AVG	SLG
Eddie Rosario	57	210	31	54	7	0	13	42	3	19	.257	.476
Jorge Polanco	55	209	22	54	8	0	4	19	4	13	.258	.354
Miguel Sanó	53	186	31	38	12	0	13	25	0	18	.204	.478
Nelson Cruz	53	185	33	56	6	0	16	33	0	25	.303	.595
Marwin González	53	175	15	37	4	0	5	22	0	17	.211	.320
Max Kepler	48	171	27	39	9	0	9	23	3	22	.228	.439
Byron Buxton	39	130	19	33	3	0	13	27	2	2	.254	.577
Jake Cave	42	113	17	25	3	2	4	15	0	5	.221	.389
Luis Arráez	32	112	16	36	9	0	0	13	0	8	.321	.402
Ehire Adrianza	44	89	10	17	7	0	0	3	1	11	.191	.270
Josh Donaldson	28	81	14	18	2	0	6	11	0	18	.222	.469
Mitch Garver	23	72	8	12	1	0	2	5	0	7	.167	.264
Ryan Jeffers	26	55	5	15	0	0	3	7	0	5	.273	.436
Alex Avila	23	49	6	9	2	0	1	2	0	11	.184	.286
LaMonte Wade Jr.	16	39	3	9	3	0	0	1	1	4	.231	.308
Ildemaro Vargas	10	22	3	5	1	1	0	2	0	1	.227	.364
Brent Rooker	7	19	4	6	2	0	1	5	0	0	.316	.579
Willians Astudillo	8	16	4	4	1	0	1	3	0	0	.250	.500
Travis Blankenhorn	1	3	0	1	1	0	0	0	0	0	.333	.667
Aaron Whitefield	3	1	1	0	0	0	0	0	0	0	.000	.000
Team totals	60	1937	269	468	81	3	91	258	14	186	.242	.427

=== Pitching ===
Note: W = Wins; L = Losses; ERA = Earned run average; G = Games pitched; GS = Games started; SV = Saves; IP = Innings pitched; H = Hits allowed; R = Runs allowed; ER = Earned runs allowed; BB = Walks allowed; SO = Strikeouts

Player	W	L	ERA	G	GS	SV	IP	H	R	ER	BB	SO
Kenta Maeda	6	1	2.70	11	11	0	66.2	40	20	20	10	80
José Berríos	5	4	4.00	12	12	0	63.0	57	28	28	26	68
Randy Dobnak	6	4	4.05	10	10	0	46.2	50	21	21	13	27
Rich Hill	2	2	3.03	8	8	0	38.2	28	13	13	17	31
Michael Pineda	2	0	3.38	5	5	0	26.2	25	10	10	7	25
Tyler Clippard	2	1	2.77	26	2	0	26.0	19	9	8	4	26
Matt Wisler	0	1	1.07	18	4	1	25.1	15	3	3	14	35
Tyler Duffey	1	1	1.88	22	0	0	24.0	13	6	5	6	31
Jorge Alcalá	2	1	2.63	16	0	0	24.0	21	8	7	8	27
Trevor May	1	0	3.86	24	0	2	23.1	20	11	10	7	38
Taylor Rogers	2	4	4.05	21	0	9	20.0	26	14	9	4	24
Sergio Romo	1	2	4.05	24	0	5	20.0	16	9	9	7	23
Caleb Thielbar	2	1	2.25	17	0	0	20.0	14	6	5	9	22
Lewis Thorpe	0	1	6.06	7	1	0	16.1	24	12	11	10	10
Devin Smeltzer	2	0	6.75	7	1	0	16.0	19	12	12	5	15
Cody Stashak	1	0	3.00	11	0	0	15.0	11	5	5	3	17
Jake Odorizzi	0	1	6.59	4	4	0	13.2	16	10	10	3	12
Homer Bailey	1	0	3.38	2	2	0	8.0	6	3	3	3	7
Sean Poppen	0	0	4.70	6	0	0	7.2	9	4	4	4	10
Zack Littell	0	0	9.95	6	0	0	6.1	12	7	7	3	3
Danny Coulombe	0	0	0.00	2	0	0	2.2	2	0	0	3	3
Cory Gearrin	0	0	0.00	1	0	0	2.0	0	0	0	2	1
Ehire Adrianza	0	0	9.00	1	0	0	1.0	1	1	1	0	0
Edwar Colina	0	0	81.00	1	0	0	0.1	4	3	3	2	0
Team totals	36	24	3.58	60	60	17	513.1	448	215	204	170	535

== Farm system ==
Level	Team	League	Manager
AAA	Rochester Red Wings	International League	Toby Gardenhire
AA	Pensacola Blue Wahoos	Southern League	Ramon Borrego
A-Advanced	Fort Myers Mighty Mussels	Florida State League	
A	Cedar Rapids Kernels	Midwest League	Brian Dinkelmam
Rookie	Elizabethton Twins	Appalachian League	Ray Smith
Rookie	GCL Twins	Gulf Coast League	
Rookie	DSL Twins	Dominican Summer League	
