= 2020 American League Wild Card Series =

Professional baseball postseason series

- September 29–October 1, 2020
- Tampa Bay Rays 2–0 Toronto Blue Jays
- Oakland Athletics 2–1 Chicago White Sox
- Minnesota Twins 0–2 Houston Astros
- Cleveland Indians 0–2 New York Yankees
- ← 2019 ALWC 2021 →

The 2020 American League Wild Card Series were four best-of-three series in Major League Baseball’s (MLB) 2020 postseason to determine participating teams in the 2020 American League Division Series. Due to the COVID-19 pandemic, MLB expanded the postseason from 10 to 16 teams (8 for each league) with all teams starting in the wild card round instead of holding the regular Wild Card Game for each league. All games for each series were played at the higher seeded team's home ballpark and were a best-of-three series.

The matchups were:

- (1) Tampa Bay Rays (AL East champions) vs. (8) Toronto Blue Jays (second Wild Card): Rays won the series, 2–0.
- (2) Oakland Athletics (AL West champions) vs. (7) Chicago White Sox (first Wild Card): Athletics won the series, 2–1.
- (3) Minnesota Twins (AL Central champions) vs. (6) Houston Astros (AL West 2nd place): Astros won the series, 2–0.
- (4) Cleveland Indians (AL Central 2nd place) vs. (5) New York Yankees (AL East 2nd place): Yankees won the series, 2–0.

== Background ==
On September 15, 2020, MLB announced the playoff bracket for the 2020 season, which was shortened to 60 regular season games due to the COVID-19 pandemic. The postseason consisted of eight teams from each league: the top two teams from each division, plus the teams from each division with the next two best records. The Wild Card Series were best-of-three series, as opposed to the play-in game format of the Wild Card Game from previous seasons, while the Division Series, League Championship Series, and World Series were their normal lengths. All Wild Card Series games were played at the home field of the higher seeded team.

== Matchups ==
=== Tampa Bay Rays vs. Toronto Blue Jays ===
Tampa Bay won the series, 2–0.

Game	Date	Score	Location	Time	Attendance
1	September 29	Toronto Blue Jays – 1, Tampa Bay Rays – 3	Tropicana Field	3:06	N/A
2	September 30	Toronto Blue Jays – 2, Tampa Bay Rays – 8	Tropicana Field	3:05	N/A

=== Oakland Athletics vs. Chicago White Sox ===
Oakland won the series, 2–1.

Game	Date	Score	Location	Time	Attendance
1	September 29	Chicago White Sox – 4, Oakland Athletics – 1	Oakland Coliseum	2:53	N/A
2	September 30	Chicago White Sox – 3, Oakland Athletics – 5	Oakland Coliseum	3:05	N/A
3	October 1	Chicago White Sox – 4, Oakland Athletics – 6	Oakland Coliseum	4:09	N/A

=== Minnesota Twins vs. Houston Astros ===
Houston won the series, 2–0.

Game	Date	Score	Location	Time	Attendance
1	September 29	Houston Astros – 4, Minnesota Twins – 1	Target Field	3:49	N/A
2	September 30	Houston Astros – 3, Minnesota Twins – 1	Target Field	3:32	N/A

=== Cleveland Indians vs. New York Yankees ===
New York won the series, 2–0.

Game	Date	Score	Location	Time	Attendance
1	September 29	New York Yankees – 12, Cleveland Indians – 3	Progressive Field	3:17	N/A
2	September 30	New York Yankees – 10, Cleveland Indians – 9	Progressive Field	4:50	N/A

== Tampa Bay vs. Toronto ==
This is the first postseason series between the Rays and Blue Jays.

=== Game 1 ===
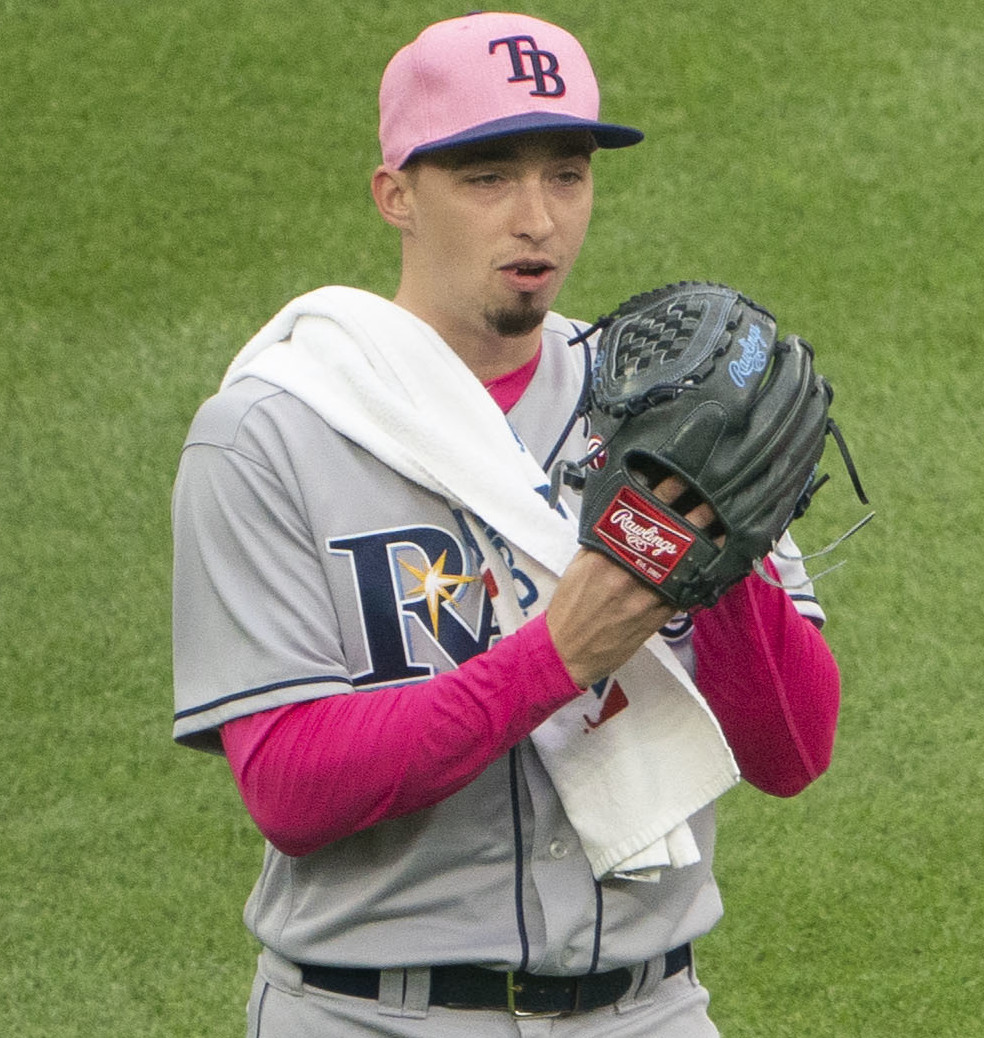
Blake Snell got the win in Game 1.

September 29, 2020 5:07 pm (EDT) at Tropicana Field in St. Petersburg, Florida
Team	1	2	3	4	5	6	7	8	9	R	H	E
Toronto	0	0	0	0	0	0	0	1	0	1	5	0
Tampa Bay	0	0	0	1	0	0	2	0	X	3	4	0
WP: Blake Snell (1–0) LP: Robbie Ray (0–1) Sv: Pete Fairbanks (1); Home runs: TOR: None; TB: Manuel Margot (1); Attendance: N/A; Boxscore

Game 1 was a low-scoring affair as both teams were held scoreless through the first three innings by Matt Shoemaker and Blake Snell. The Rays put the first run on the board after Randy Arozarena scored from third on a wild pitch from Robbie Ray in the fourth. Snell would pitch into the sixth, getting lifted for reliever Diego Castillo after 5 2/3 scoreless innings and nine strikeouts. Manuel Margot padded the Rays' lead in the seventh with a two-run homer and the bullpen limited the Blue Jays to a Bo Bichette sac fly to win the game and take a 1-0 series lead.

=== Game 2 ===
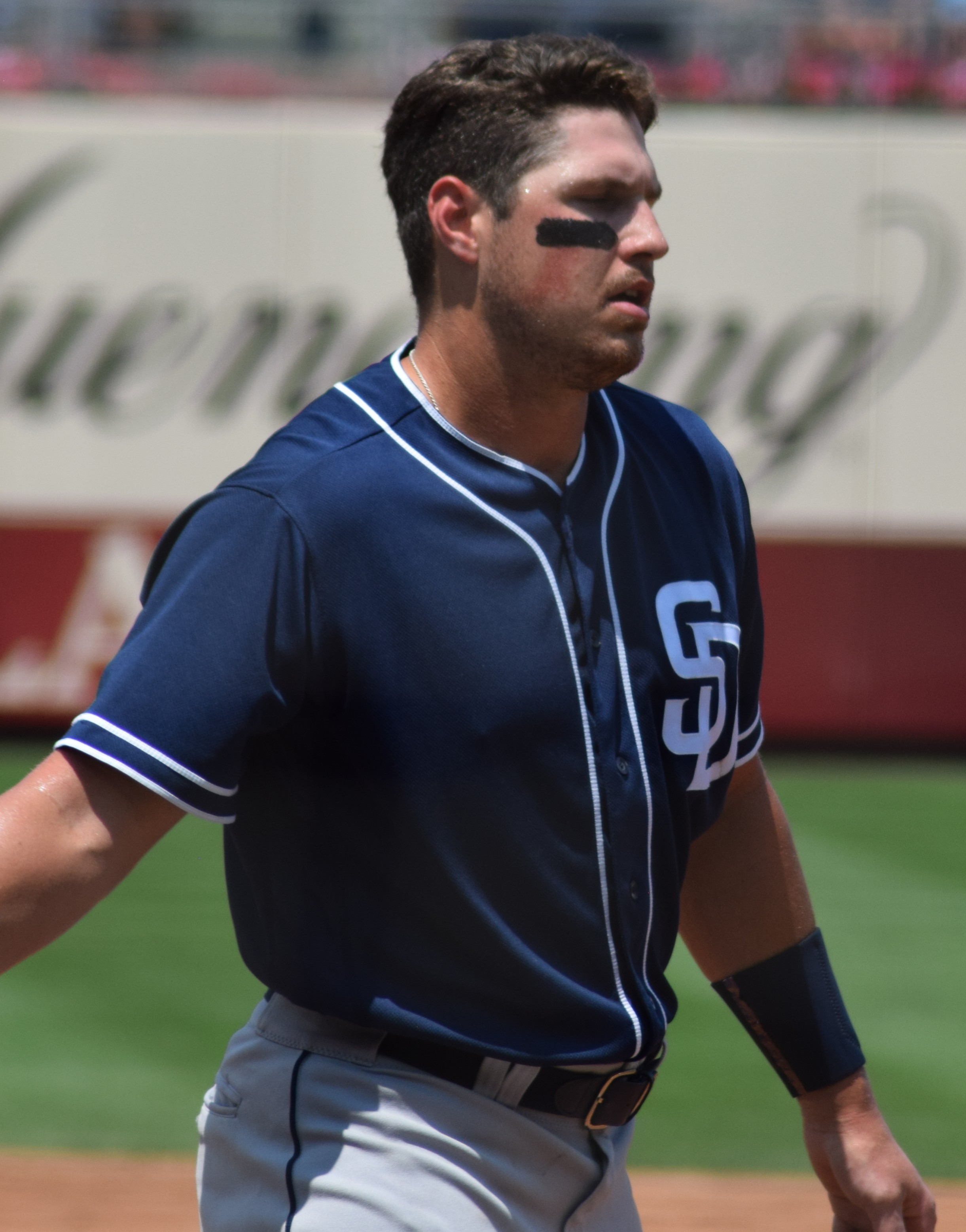
Hunter Renfroe (pictured here with the Padres) hit a grand slam in Game 2.

September 30, 2020 4:07 pm (EDT) at Tropicana Field in St. Petersburg, Florida
Team	1	2	3	4	5	6	7	8	9	R	H	E
Toronto	0	0	1	0	1	0	0	0	0	2	7	2
Tampa Bay	1	6	1	0	0	0	0	0	X	8	12	0
WP: Tyler Glasnow (1–0) LP: Hyun-jin Ryu (0–1); Home runs: TOR: Danny Jansen 2 (2); TB: Mike Zunino (1), Hunter Renfroe (1); Attendance: N/A; Boxscore

Facing elimination, the Blue Jays tasked Hyun-jin Ryu with keeping their season alive while the Rays turned to Tyler Glasnow to send them to the ALDS. The Rays jumped on Ryu early, starting off the game with three consecutive singles before Manuel Margot drove in the game's first run with an RBI single. The Rays then knocked Ryu out of the game in the second after a Mike Zunino two run homer and a Hunter Renfroe grand slam put up a six spot in the inning. Glasnow shut down the Blue Jays offense, striking out eight over six innings. Danny Jansen would provide the only offense for the Blue Jays with two solo home runs in the third and fifth, but the Rays bullpen would keep the game well out of reach for an 8–2 win and a 2–0 series win.

=== Composite line score ===
2020 ALWC (2–0): Tampa Bay Rays beat Toronto Blue Jays

Team	1	2	3	4	5	6	7	8	9	R	H	E
Toronto Blue Jays	0	0	1	0	1	0	0	1	0	3	12	2
Tampa Bay Rays	1	6	1	1	0	0	2	0	X	11	16	0
Total attendance: N/A Average attendance: N/A

== Oakland vs. Chicago ==
This is the first postseason series between the Athletics and White Sox.

=== Game 1 ===
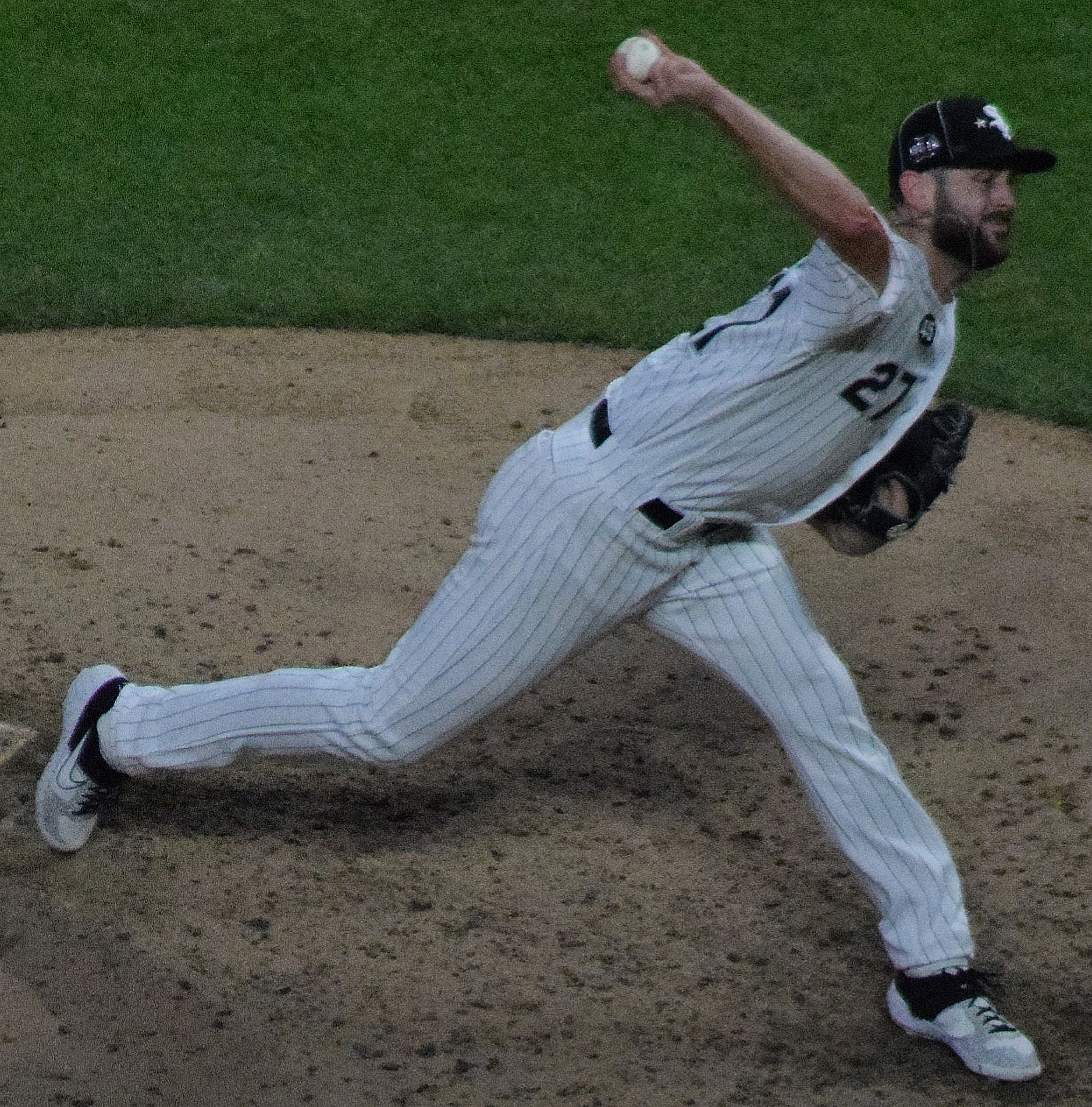
Lucas Giolito threw seven innings and got the win in Game 1.

September 29, 2020 12:08 pm (PDT) at Oakland Coliseum in Oakland, California
Team	1	2	3	4	5	6	7	8	9	R	H	E
Chicago	0	1	2	0	0	0	0	1	0	4	9	0
Oakland	0	0	0	0	0	0	0	1	0	1	3	0
WP: Lucas Giolito (1–0) LP: Jesús Luzardo (0–1) Sv: Álex Colomé (1); Home runs: CWS: Adam Engel (1), Jose Abreu (1), Yasmani Grandal (1); OAK: None; Attendance: N/A; Boxscore

Lucas Giolito was tabbed as the Game 1 starter in the White Sox' first postseason game since 2008 while Jesús Luzardo started for the A's. The White Sox struck first with an Adam Engel solo shot in the second inning and a two-run shot by José Abreu in the third. Luzardo was lifted in the fourth for J.B. Wendelken finishing his day with three runs and five strikeouts over 3 1/3 innings pitched. Yasmani Grandal padded the lead with a solo shot in the eighth while Giolito cruised through seven innings, striking out eight, before allowing two baserunners to lead off the bottom of the inning. Evan Marshall came on in relief and gave up one run on a Ramón Laureano fielder's choice before closing out the inning. Álex Colomé pitched a perfect ninth to close out the game and give the White Sox a 1-0 series lead. This was the White Sox' first postseason win since Game 3 of the 2008 ALDS.

=== Game 2 ===
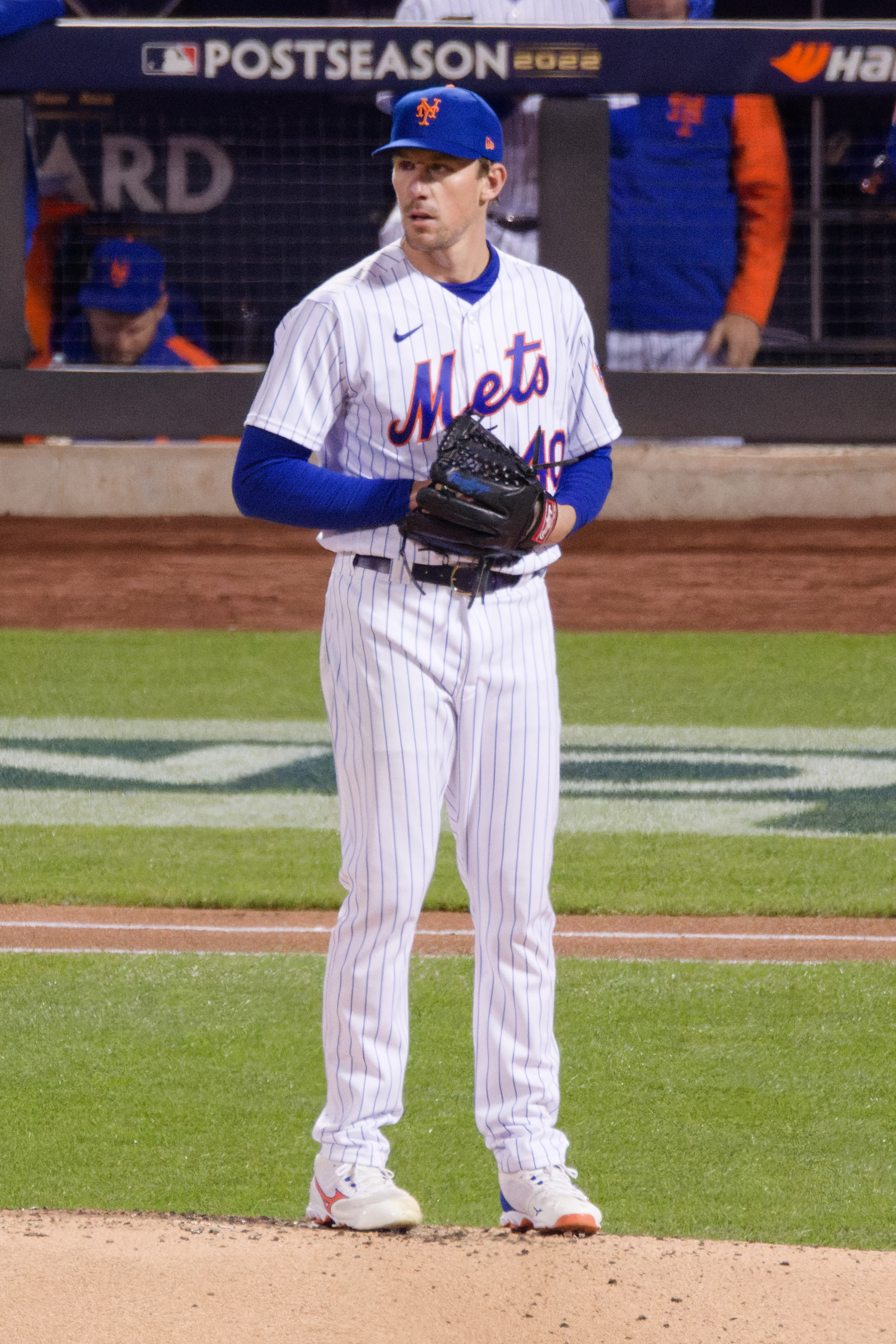
Chris Bassitt (pictured here with the Mets) got the win in Game 2.

September 30, 2020 12:10 pm (PDT) at Oakland Coliseum in Oakland, California
Team	1	2	3	4	5	6	7	8	9	R	H	E
Chicago	0	0	0	0	0	0	0	2	1	3	10	2
Oakland	2	2	0	1	0	0	0	0	X	5	7	0
WP: Chris Bassitt (1–0) LP: Dallas Keuchel (0–1) Sv: Jake Diekman (1); Home runs: CWS: Yasmani Grandal (2); OAK: Marcus Semien (1), Khris Davis (1); Attendance: N/A; Boxscore

Dallas Keuchel and Chris Bassitt squared off in Game 2. The Athletics struck first in the bottom of the first when Nick Madrigal mishandled a Matt Olson grounder that allowed two runs to score in the first inning. It was the first time Keuchel had been scored on in the first inning all season. Marcus Semien launched a two run home run in the second and Khris Davis followed up with a solo shot in the fourth to bring the A's lead to 5–0. Keuchel finished with four strikeouts, six hits, and three earned runs over 4 1/3 innings. Bassitt shut down the White Sox through seven innings striking out five on six hits before Yasmani Grandal hit a two run homer in the eighth to chip into the lead. The White Sox threatened again in the ninth when Grandal drew a bases loaded walk to bring the game within two, but Jake Diekman got José Abreu to ground out to end the game and hang on for a series-tying victory.

=== Game 3 ===
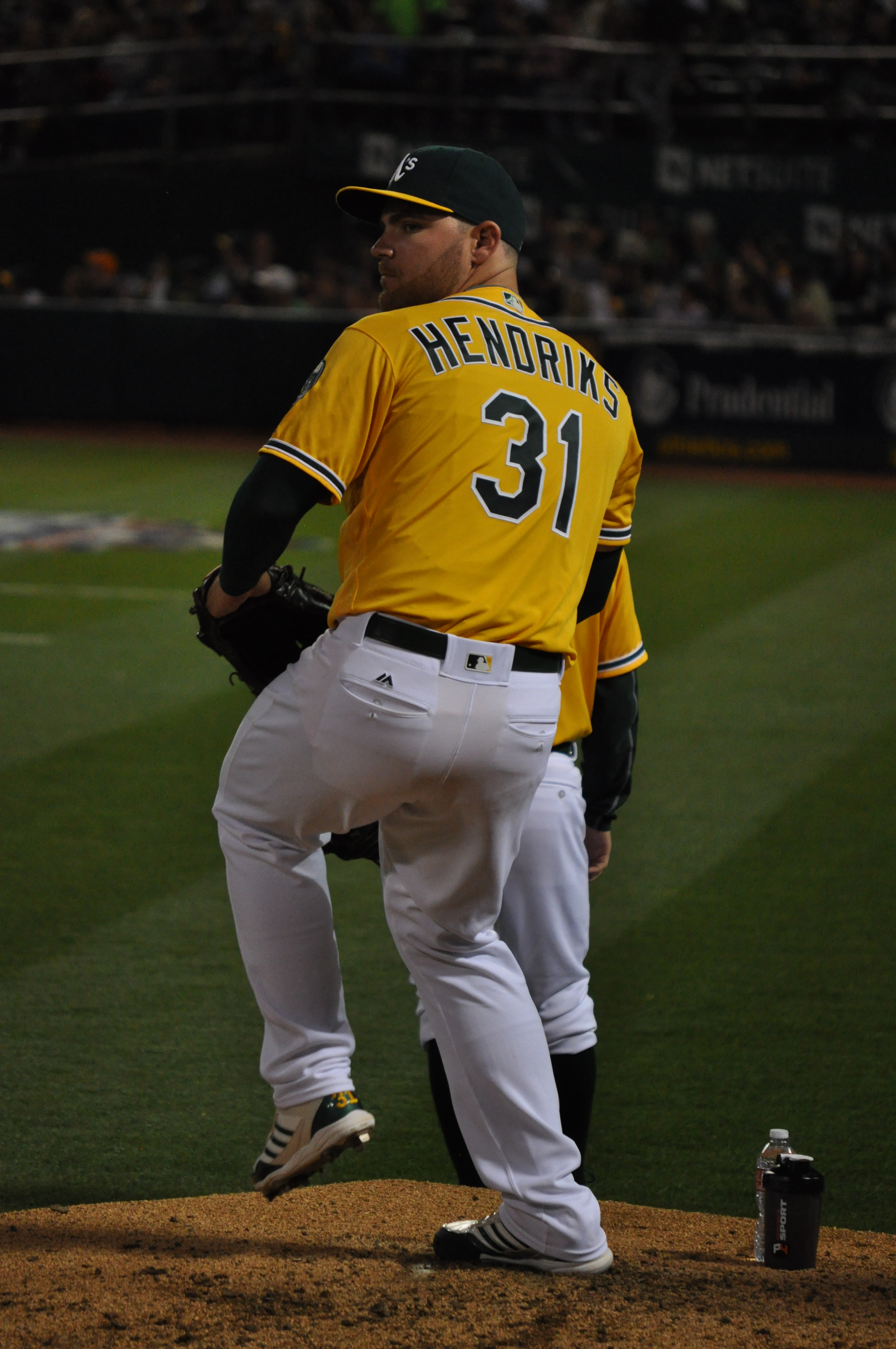
Liam Hendriks closed out the series in Game 3.

October 1, 2020 12:10 pm (PDT) at Oakland Coliseum in Oakland, California
Team	1	2	3	4	5	6	7	8	9	R	H	E
Chicago	0	1	2	0	1	0	0	0	0	4	12	1
Oakland	0	0	0	4	2	0	0	0	X	6	8	1
WP: Frankie Montas (1–0) LP: Evan Marshall (0–1) Sv: Liam Hendriks (1); Home runs: CWS: Luis Robert (1); OAK: Sean Murphy (1); Attendance: N/A; Boxscore

Game 3 was the first winner-take-all elimination game in the White Sox' 119-year history. On the other side, the Athletics had lost nine straight winner-take-all elimination games up to that point. Both clubs opted for a bullpen game as it was all hands-on deck with Dane Dunning starting for the White Sox and Mike Fiers starting for the A's. After an eventful first inning with no runs scored, Luis Robert pummeled a 487 foot solo shot to get the scoring started. In the third, Robert would drive in another with an RBI single and Nomar Mazara followed up with an RBI double to bring the score to 3–0. After getting two outs, Sean Murphy got the A's on the board with two run home run off of Codi Heuer in the fourth. Carlos Rodón came in try to close out the inning, but he failed to record an out after loading the bases. Matt Foster relieved Rodón and walked the next two batters with the bases loaded to give the A's the lead. The White Sox tied the game in the fifth on a Mazara RBI single, but the A's responded with a two-run single from Chad Pinder in the bottom of the frame. The A's bullpen bent but did not break for the next three innings, stranding five White Sox baserunners. Liam Hendriks struck out the side in the ninth to end the game and seal a 2–1 series win for the Athletics. It was Oakland's first postseason series win since 2006. This was the final MLB postseason game in Oakland before the Athletics relocated to Sacramento in 2025 and Las Vegas in 2028.

=== Composite line score ===
2020 ALWC (2–1): Oakland Athletics beat Chicago White Sox

Team	1	2	3	4	5	6	7	8	9	R	H	E
Chicago White Sox	0	2	4	0	1	0	0	3	1	11	31	3
Oakland Athletics	2	2	0	5	2	0	0	1	0	12	18	1
Total attendance: N/A Average attendance: N/A

== Minnesota vs. Houston ==
This is the first postseason meeting between the Twins and Astros.

=== Game 1 ===
September 29, 2020 1:08 pm (CDT) at Target Field in Minneapolis, Minnesota
Team	1	2	3	4	5	6	7	8	9	R	H	E
Houston	0	0	0	0	0	0	1	0	3	4	8	0
Minnesota	0	0	1	0	0	0	0	0	0	1	4	1
WP: Framber Valdez (1–0) LP: Sergio Romo (0–1); Attendance: N/A; Boxscore

Game 1, the first time the two teams had faced each other in the postseason, featured Zack Greinke for the Astros against Kenta Maeda for the Twins. Nelson Cruz opened the scoring with an RBI double in the third. Greinke was lifted in the fifth and finished his day with two hits and three walks over four innings pitched. Maeda turned in a strong performance, only allowing two hits over five innings while striking out five; however, George Springer laced an RBI double off of Tyler Duffey in the seventh to tie the game. The game remained tied into the ninth inning until the Twins defense fell apart. Sergio Romo got the first two outs of the inning after giving up consecutive singles, but Jorge Polanco overthrew second baseman Luis Arráez on what should have been an inning ending force out, allowing the Astros to load the bases. Romo then walked Jose Altuve with the bases loaded to drive in the go-ahead run. Caleb Thielbar came on in relief and promptly gave up a 2-run single to Michael Brantley to pad the Astros' lead at 4-1. Framber Valdez, who had taken over for Greinke in the fifth, would allow two singles in the ninth, but induced a double play to end the game and give the Astros a 1–0 lead in the series. This was the Twins’ 17th straight postseason loss, setting a team record for major professional sports in North America.

=== Game 2 ===
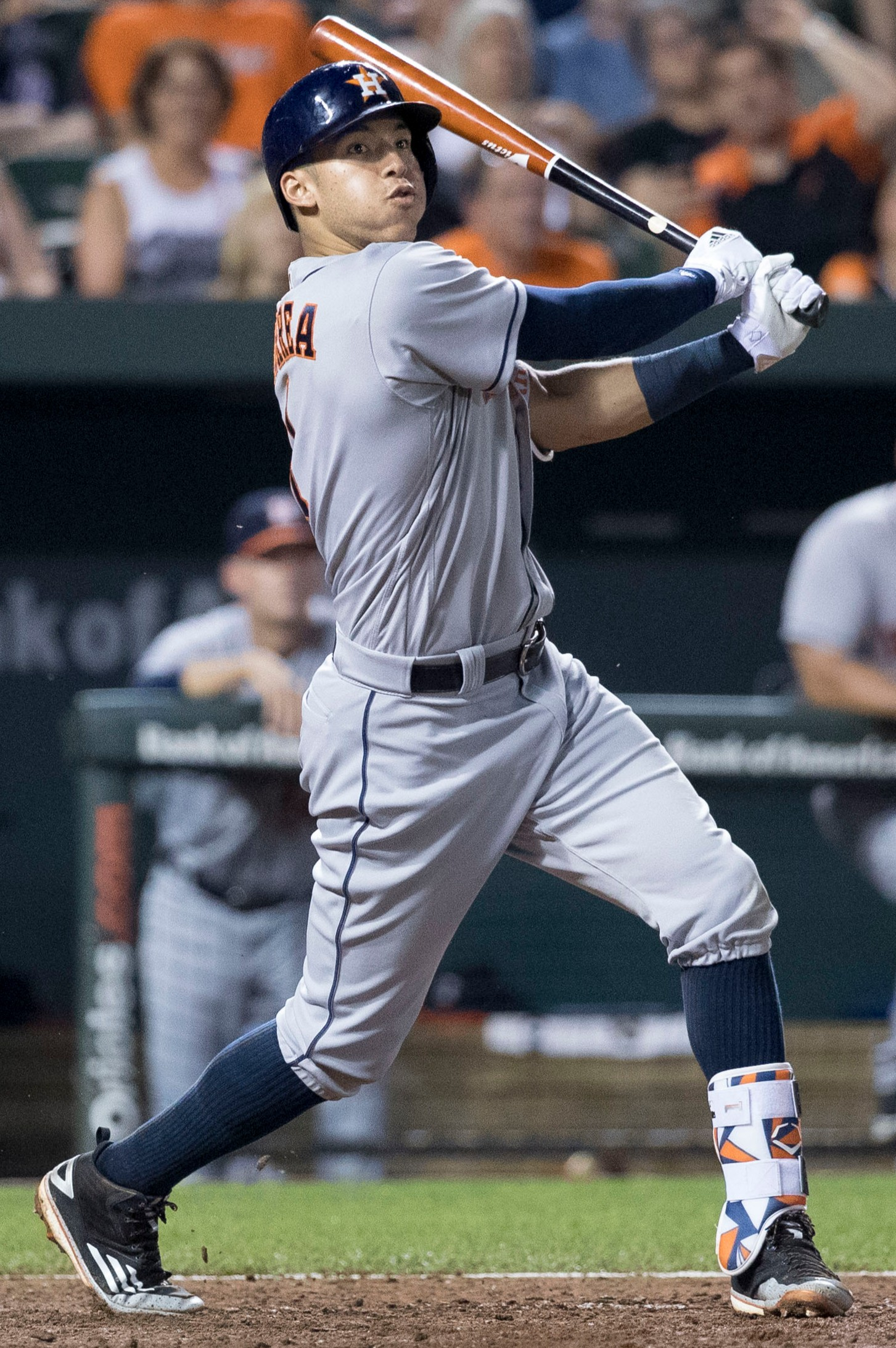
Carlos Correa hit the series winning home run in Game 2.

September 30, 2020 12:08 pm (CDT) at Target Field in Minneapolis, Minnesota
Team	1	2	3	4	5	6	7	8	9	R	H	E
Houston	0	0	0	1	0	0	1	0	1	3	5	1
Minnesota	0	0	0	0	1	0	0	0	0	1	3	0
WP: Cristian Javier (1–0) LP: Cody Stashak (0–1) Sv: Ryan Pressly (1); Home runs: HOU: Carlos Correa (1); MIN: None; Attendance: N/A; Boxscore

José Berríos and José Urquidy squared off in Game 2. Both pitchers kept the game scoreless through three before Kyle Tucker drove in the game's first run on an RBI single in the fourth. Berríos would pitch five innings, giving up only the one run and striking out four. Urquidy threw four scoreless innings before giving up a lead off single to Marwin Gonzalez in the fifth. Nelson Cruz would tie the game on an RBI double off of Brooks Raley and finishing Urquidy's line at 4 1/3 innings pitched of one-run ball.who pitched 4 2/3 scoreless innings while allowing just one hit. Carlos Correa hit a go-ahead home run in the seventh off of Cody Stashak in the seventh and Tucker tacked on an insurance run in the ninth with another RBI single before the Astros' bullpen closed out the game and the series. The Astros bullpen would finish the series with 9 2/3 scoreless innings, giving up only three hits while striking out ten across the two games. This was the Twins' 18th straight postseason loss, extending their record. This was Dusty Baker's first playoff series win since the 2003 National League Division Series while he was manager of the Chicago Cubs.

=== Composite line score ===
2020 ALWC (2–0): Houston Astros beat Minnesota Twins

Team	1	2	3	4	5	6	7	8	9	R	H	E
Houston Astros	0	0	0	1	0	0	2	0	4	7	13	1
Minnesota Twins	0	0	1	0	1	0	0	0	0	2	7	1
Total attendance: N/A Average attendance: N/A

== Cleveland vs. New York ==
This is the fifth postseason meeting between the Indians and Yankees, with both teams splitting their first four postseason meetings. The Indians previously won the 1997 American League Division Series 3–2 and the 2007 American League Division Series 3–1, while the Yankees previously won the 1998 American League Championship Series 4–2 and the 2017 American League Division Series 3–2.

=== Game 1 ===
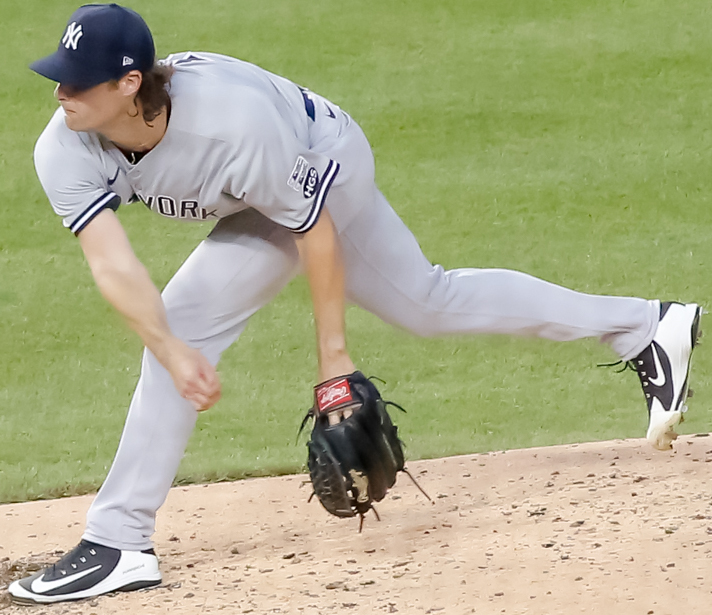
Gerrit Cole got the win in Game 1.

September 29, 2020 7:08 pm (EDT) at Progressive Field in Cleveland, Ohio
Team	1	2	3	4	5	6	7	8	9	R	H	E
New York	2	0	1	2	2	0	4	0	1	12	15	0
Cleveland	0	0	1	1	0	0	0	0	1	3	8	0
WP: Gerrit Cole (1–0) LP: Shane Bieber (0–1); Home runs: NYY: Aaron Judge (1), Gleyber Torres (1), Brett Gardner (1), Giancarlo Stanton (1); CLE: Josh Naylor (1); Attendance: N/A; Boxscore

The first game matched the prime stars for both squads in Gerrit Cole and Shane Bieber, with the latter having won the pitching Triple Crown for the 2020 season. The Yankees took an early lead when Aaron Judge hit a home run on the first pitch he saw from Bieber, who had allowed the leadoff hitter in DJ LeMahieu to get on base with a single. Luke Voit increased the lead to three in the third inning on a double. The Indians countered with a run on a José Ramírez double that made it 3–1, but a Carlos Santana strike out culled the chance for more with runners on the corner. The Yankees responded with a Brett Gardner RBI double and a subsequent LeMahieu RBI single to make it 5–1. Josh Naylor made it 5–2 on a home run, while Gleyber Torres responded with a home run of his own to make it 7–2. The Yankees blew the game further open with runs driven in by Urshela, Torres, and Gardner to make for four runs in the seventh before finishing with a Giancarlo Stanton home run. The Indians closed the scoring with a Tyler Naquin RBI single that made the final score 12–3. Cole struck out thirteen batters in seven innings while allowing two runs on six hits. He was the second pitcher to throw thirteen strikeouts with zero walks and the first since Tom Seaver did so in Game 1 of the 1973 National League Championship Series. Bieber allowed seven runs on nine hits while striking out seven with two walks that saw him last 4 2/3 innings.

=== Game 2 ===
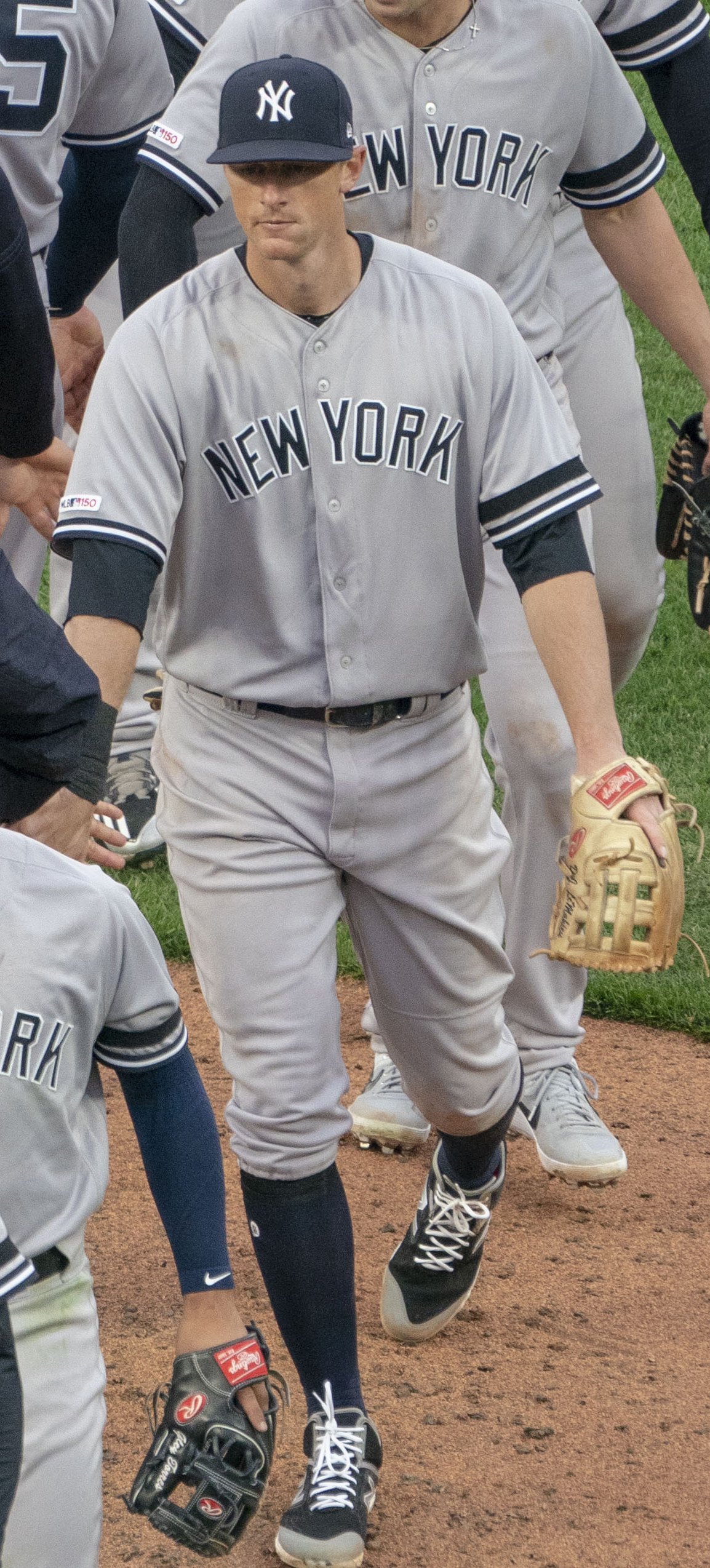
DJ LeMahieu drove in the series winning run in Game 2.

September 30, 2020 7:08 pm (EDT) at Progressive Field in Cleveland, Ohio
Team	1	2	3	4	5	6	7	8	9	R	H	E
New York	0	1	0	4	1	2	0	0	2	10	8	0
Cleveland	4	0	0	0	2	0	2	1	0	9	10	2
WP: Aroldis Chapman (1–0) LP: Brad Hand (0–1); Home runs: NYY: Giancarlo Stanton (2), Gio Urshela (1), Gary Sanchez (1); CLE: None; Attendance: N/A; Boxscore

Masahiro Tanaka was matched against Carlos Carrasco, but neither starter would factor into the final result. Tanaka pitched four innings but allowed six runs on five hits with three strikeouts and walks, while Carrasco allowed four runs on two hits with three walks to six strikeouts on three innings. The Indians led 4–0 on RBI doubles by José Ramírez and Josh Naylor and a Roberto Perez RBI single in the first inning. Giancarlo Stanton made it 4–1 with a home run in the second inning. The fourth inning saw the Yankees take the lead after driving Carrasco from the game on a triple and two walks. Gio Urshela, facing James Karinchak, hit a grand slam on a full count to take the lead. Phil Maton took over after two walks and managed to strand the runners to alleviate further damage. In the next inning, he allowed a run to score on a sacrifice fly by Stanton. Tanaka was driven out of the game in the fifth after allowing a double and a walk to be replaced by Chad Green. Ramirez would tie the game on a two-run double. Triston McKenzie took over for the sixth to pitch for Cleveland. A walk followed by a home run by Gary Sanchez meant an 8–6 lead for New York. Zack Britton managed to garner the first two outs of the seventh before being taken out for Jonathan Loaisiga after walking two batters. Jordan Luplow would tie the game on a two-run double. Loaisiga would allow the first two batters to reach on walks in the eighth and was replaced by Aroldis Chapman. On the first pitch he saw, César Hernández hit a single that would break the tie at eight and give them the lead. Brad Hand was sent out to save the ninth inning for the Indians. He allowed a walk and two singles to load the bases. This would be followed by a strikeout before a sacrifice fly by Sanchez to tie the game at nine. With two outs, LeMahieu would break the tie on an RBI single to make it 10–9. Chapman would strike out three of the four batters he saw to finish the game for the Yankees.

This extended the Indians consecutive playoff losing streak to eight games. This was the fourth time in the last five years that the Indians were eliminated from the postseason at home. At four hours and 50 minutes, this set a record as the longest nine-inning game in MLB history. This was also Francisco Lindor's last game with the Cleveland Indians, as he was traded along with Carlos Carrasco to the New York Mets in the off-season. This was Cleveland’s final playoff game as the Indians before they changed names to the Guardians in 2022.

=== Composite line score ===
2020 ALWC (2–0): New York Yankees beat Cleveland Indians

Team	1	2	3	4	5	6	7	8	9	R	H	E
New York Yankees	2	1	1	6	3	2	4	0	3	22	23	0
Cleveland Indians	4	0	1	1	2	0	2	1	1	12	18	2
Total attendance: N/A Average attendance: N/A

== Broadcasting ==
The games were televised on ESPN and TBS in the United States, with ABC showing the first game of the Twins–Astros series and ESPN2 showing the second game. TBS aired the entirety of the Rays–Blue Jays series. Sportsnet, a property of Toronto Blue Jays owner Rogers Communications, broadcast games in Canada but it was not allowed to produce its own Blue Jays telecast.

== See also ==
- 2020 National League Wild Card Series
- Guardians–Yankees rivalry
