= Venezuelan Professional Baseball League rosters =

Baseball team

Below are the rosters for the Liga Venezolana de Beisbol Profesional (LVBP), an off-season baseball league owned and operated by Major League Baseball in Venezuela.

== LVBP rosters ==
=== Navegantes del Magallanes ===
Navegantes del Magallanes roster – 2024-25 LVBP season
Players		Coaches
Pitchers: 65 (Venezuela) Alfred Gutierrez; -- (Venezuela) Amilcar Chirinos; 50 (Venezuela) Angel Acevedo; 85 (Venezuela) Angel Hernandez; 76 (Venezuela) Anthony Vizcaya; 89 (Venezuela) Brayan Palencia; 42 (Venezuela) Bryan Mata; -- (United States) Bubby Rossman; 94 (Dominican Republic) Cristofer Ogando; 22 (Venezuela) Deolis Guerra; 32 (United States) Derek West; 83 (Venezuela) Eduard Bazardo; 86 (Venezuela) Edwar Colina; 67 (Venezuela) Enderson Franco; 99 (Venezuela) Felipe Vázquez; 34 (Nicaragua) J. C. Ramírez; 71 (Venezuela) Jesus Paricaguan; 38 (Venezuela) Jesús Tinoco; 72 (Venezuela) Jhan Zambrano; 43 (Venezuela) Jose Martinez; 41 (Venezuela) Junior Guerra; 95 (Venezuela) Luis Martinez; -- (Japan) Masahiro Fukuda; 58 (Venezuela) Nivaldo Rodríguez; 69 (United States) Stevie Ledesma; 92 (United States) Tyler Alexander; 96 (Venezuela) Wilker Palma; 56 (Venezuela) Wilking Rodríguez; updated on 13 March 2025	Catchers: 63 (Venezuela) Arturo Nieto; 87 (Venezuela) Eliézer Alfonzo; 40 (Venezuela) Luis Torrens; -- (Venezuela) Pablo Aliendo; 31 (Venezuela) Manuel Boscan; 17 (Venezuela) Ramón Cabrera; 53 (Venezuela) Rusber Estrada; Infielders: 77 (Venezuela) Aeverson Arteaga; -- (Venezuela) Angelo Castellano; 30 (Venezuela) Diego Castillo; o6 (Venezuela) Edgardo Fermin; 68 (Venezuela) Gabriel Arias; 07 (Venezuela) Jose Gomez; 18 (Venezuela) José Peraza; 78 (Venezuela) Luis Marquez; 82 (Venezuela) Luis Suisbel; 39 (Venezuela) Renato Núñez; 14 (Venezuela) Tucupita Marcano; 26 (Venezuela) Yangervis Solarte; Outfielders: 75 (Venezuela) Alberth Martinez; 36 (Venezuela) Carlos D. Rodriguez; 08 (Venezuela) Diego Rincones; 60 (Venezuela) Jose Cordoba; 62 (Venezuela) Leandro Pineda; 52 (Venezuela) Miguel Aparicio; 90 (Colombia) Tito Polo	Manager: (Venezuela) Eddie Pérez; Coaches: 53 (Venezuela) Félix Escalona (First Base); 74 (Mexico) Cesar Hernandez (Bullpen Catcher); 25 (Venezuela) Victor Oramas (Third Base); 46 (Venezuela) Robert Pérez (Hitting); 16 (Mexico) Luis Rivera (Pitching); 89 (Venezuela) Nestor Rojas (Bench); -- (Venezuela) Jose Villa (Bullpen)

2022 Caribbean Series roster

Venezuela 2022 Caribbean Series Roster
Players		Coaches
Pitchers: 37 (Venezuela) Henderson Álvarez; 99 (Venezuela) Silvino Bracho; 34 (Venezuela) Vicente Campos; 0 (Venezuela) Henry Centeno; 67 (Venezuela) Enderson Franco; 61 (Venezuela) Yapson Gómez; 27 (Venezuela) Junior Guerra; 39 (Venezuela) César Jiménez; 83 (Venezuela) José Martínez; 65 (Venezuela) Yohander Méndez; 56 (Venezuela) Wilking Rodríguez; 95 (Venezuela) Danny Rondón; 80 (Venezuela) Bruce Rondón; 35 (Venezuela) Erick Leal; 76 (Venezuela) Anthony Vizcaya; 66 (Venezuela) Robert Zarate; updated on 31 January 2020	Catchers: 98 (Venezuela) Francisco Arcia; 87 (Venezuela) Anderson De La Rosa; 63 (Venezuela) Arturo Nieto; Infielders: 17 (Venezuela) Rayder Ascanio; 28 (Venezuela) Balbino Fuenmayor; 16 (Venezuela) Gabriel Noriega; 4 (Venezuela) Niuman Romero; 48 (Venezuela) Pablo Sandoval; 5 (Brazil) Leonardo Reginatto; 14 (Venezuela) Engelb Vielma; Outfielders: 96 (Venezuela) Willians Astudillo; 33 (Dominican Republic) Alejandro De Aza; 32 (United States) Cade Gotta; 75 (Venezuela) Alberth Martínez; 31 (Venezuela) Ángel Reyes; 6 (Venezuela) Danry Vásquez	Manager: -- (Venezuela) Willie Romero; Coaches

=== Leones del Caracas ===
Leones del Caracas 2020-2021 Roster
Players		Coaches
Pitchers: 22 (Venezuela) Luis Amaya; 82 (Venezuela) Edwuin Bencomo; 74 (Venezuela) Yoimer Camacho; 61 (Venezuela) Francisco Carrillo; 40 (Venezuela) Felix Carvallo; -- (Venezuela) Anthony Castro; 77 (Venezuela) Alejandro Chacín; 68 (Venezuela) Jervic Chávez; 81 (Venezuela) Luis Chirinos; 71 (Venezuela) Franklin Dacosta; 52 (Venezuela) Edgmer Escalona; 00 (Venezuela) Juan Gonzalez; 39 (Venezuela) Norwith Gudino; 83 (Venezuela) Anjul Hernandez; -- (Venezuela) Wilkel Hernandez; 65 (Dominican Republic) Alsis Herrera; 36 (Venezuela) Ronald Herrera; 75 (Venezuela) Daniel Hurtado; -- (Venezuela) Jhaner Linares; 67 (Venezuela) Frank López; 86 (Mexico) Jaime Lugo; 34 (Venezuela) Loiger Padrón; 63 (Venezuela) Carlos Quevedo; 87 (Dominican Republic) Eduard Reyes; 79 (Venezuela) Jesus Rodriguez; 55 (Venezuela) Miguel Socolovich; -- (Venezuela) Albert Suárez; 76 (Venezuela) José Torres; 48 (Venezuela) Jesus Zambrano; updated on 11 May 2021	Catchers: 85 (Venezuela) Gabriel Bracamonte; -- (Venezuela) Albert Cordero; 78 (Venezuela) Alfredo González; 89 (Venezuela) Jhonny Pereda; 58 (Venezuela) Keibert Ruiz; Infielders: 28 (Venezuela) Luis Alejandro Basabe; -- (Venezuela) Harold Castro; 05 (Venezuela) Ronny Cedeño; 66 (Dominican Republic) Andretty Cordero; 37 (Venezuela) Aldrem Corredor; 27 (Venezuela) Leonardo Ferrini; 04 (Venezuela) Jose Garcia; 15 (Venezuela) Jesús Guzmán; 07 (Venezuela) Wilfredo Tovar; Outfielders: 32 (Venezuela) Romer Cuadrado; 62 (Venezuela) Ericson Leonora; 73 (Venezuela) Alexander Palma; 29 (Venezuela) Eduard Pinto; -- (Venezuela) Víctor Reyes; 09 (Venezuela) José Rondón; 22 (Venezuela) Jesus Solorzano	Manager: -- (Venezuela) José Alguacil; Coaches: -- (Venezuela) Wilson Álvarez (Pitching); -- (Venezuela) Ramón Castro (Hitting); -- (Nicaragua) Juan Muñoz (First Base); -- (Venezuela) Lipso Nava (Bench); -- (Venezuela) Oscar Salazar (Third Base); -- (Venezuela) Mauro Zárate (Bullpen); (Coaching staff for 2021-22 season)

=== Tigres de Aragua ===
Tigres de Aragua 2020-21 Roster
Players		Coaches
Pitchers: 54 (Venezuela) Ronald Belisario; 39 (Dominican Republic) Wander Beras; 21 (Venezuela) Luis Carrasco; 60 (Mexico) Marco Carrillo; 32 (Venezuela) Enrique Castillo; 50 (Dominican Republic) Logan Duran; 90 (Cuba) Noelvis Entenza; 52 (Venezuela) Eduardo Figueroa; 59 (Venezuela) Ramon García; 48 (Cuba) Pablo Guillén; 57 (Venezuela) Ismael Guillòn; 98 (Venezuela) Dedgar Jimenez; 55 (Venezuela) Jose Martinez; 33 (Venezuela) Jhondaniel Medina; 31 (Venezuela) Yoervis Medina; 73 (Venezuela) Osmar Morales; 70 (Venezuela) Guillermo Moscoso; 64 (Venezuela) Ángel Nesbitt; 21 (Dominican Republic) Wirfin Obispo; 22 (Venezuela) Anthony Ortega; 65 (Venezuela) Angel Padron; -- (Venezuela) Jesus Parra; -- (Venezuela) Jesus Pirela; 46 (Venezuela) Henry Rodríguez; 75 (Venezuela) Rómulo Sánchez; 27 (Venezuela) Elio Silva; 45 (Venezuela) Alexis Tapia; 66 (Venezuela) Luis Ysla; updated on 14 June 2021	Catchers: 38 (Venezuela) Ramón Cabrera; 56 (Venezuela) Wilfredo Gimenez; 28 (Venezuela) Alex Monsalve; 30 (Venezuela) Gersel Pitre; Infielders: 02 (Venezuela) Alexi Amarista; 10 (Venezuela) Jose R. Flores; 35 (Venezuela) Carlos Garcia; 06 (Venezuela) Edwin Garcia; 12 (Venezuela) Alberto González; 00 (Cuba) Yosmany Guerra; 15 (Venezuela) Hernán Pérez; 07 (Venezuela) Leobaldo Piña; 09 (Venezuela) Henry Rodríguez; Outfielders: 53 (Venezuela) Carlos Arroyo; 77 (Dominican Republic) Yeison Asencio; 12 (Venezuela) Ramón Flores; 41 (Venezuela) Anthony Jimenez; 16 (Venezuela) Jose Rangel; 01 (Cuba) Roel Santos	Manager: 08 (Venezuela) Luis Ugueto; Coaches: 37 (Venezuela) Clemente Álvarez (Bullpen); 29 (Venezuela) Aarom Baldiris (Hitting); -- (Venezuela) Jorge González (First Base); -- (Venezuela) Gustavo Molina (Bench); 42 (Venezuela) Orber Moreno (Pitching); -- (Venezuela) Silverio Navas (Third Base); (Coaching staff for 2021-2022 season)
