= Alfredo Ramos =

Alfredo Ramos may refer to:

- Alfredo Ramos (Portuguese footballer) (1906–deceased)
- Alfredo Ramos (Brazilian footballer) (1924–2012)
- Alfredo Ramos Martínez (1871–1946), Mexican painter, muralist, and educator
- Alfredo Ramos (politician), Venezuelan politician, candidate in the 1998 presidential elections
