= João Belo (disambiguation) =

João Belo (1878-1928) was a Portuguese Navy officer and politician and colonial administrator in Mozambique.

Xai-Xai was previously known as João Belo, having been named after the colonial official after his death. It is the capital of Gaza Province, Mozambique.

João Belo may also refer to:

- João Belo-class frigate, a class of frigate of French design, used by the Portuguese navy
- João Belo (footballer) (1910–1960), Portuguese footballer who played as a defender
