= Carlos Rodrigues =

Carlos Rodrigues may refer to:

- Carlos Rodrigues (footballer, born 1908), Portuguese former footballer
- Carlos dos Santos Rodrigues (born 1995), also known as Carlos Ponck or simply Ponck, Cape Verdean footballer
- Carlos Rodrigues (gymnast) (born 1997), Angolan trampolinist
- Carlos Rodrigues (bishop) (born 1957), Brazilian bishop and politician
- Carlitos Rodrigues (born 1981), Portuguese footballer

== See also ==
- Carlos Rodríguez (disambiguation)
