= Randy Dobnak =

American baseball player (born 1995)

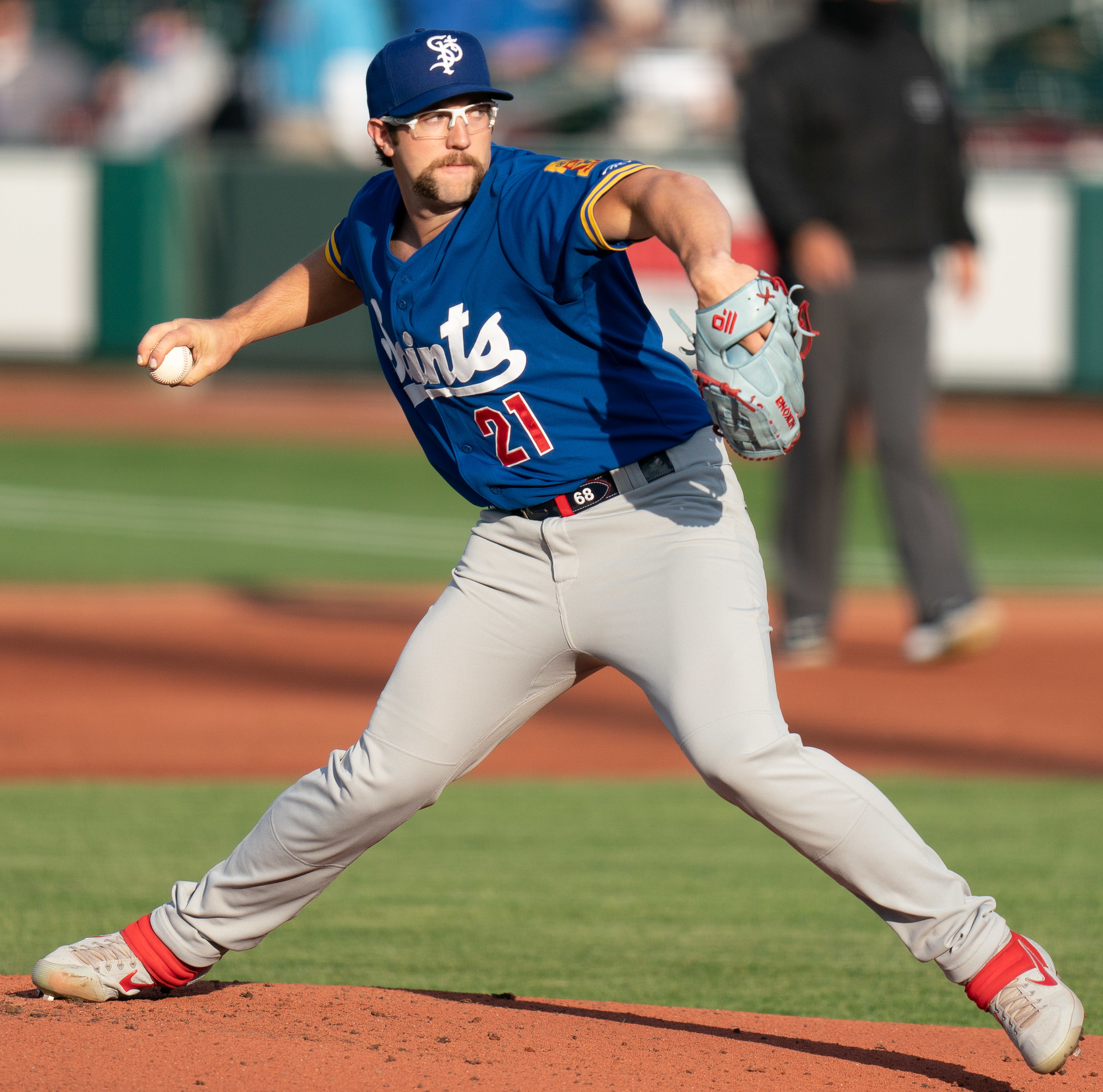
- Dobnak with the St. Paul Saints in 2021

Kansas City Royals – No. 62
- Pitcher
- Born: January 17, 1995 (age 31); South Park, Pennsylvania, U.S.
- Bats: Right Throws: Right

MLB debut
- August 9, 2019, for the Minnesota Twins

MLB statistics (through 2026 season)
- Win–loss record: 12–17
- Earned run average: 4.40
- Strikeouts: 134
- Stats at Baseball Reference

Teams
- Minnesota Twins (2019–2021, 2024–2025); Kansas City Royals (2026–present)

Randy Travis William Dobnak (born January 17, 1995) is an American professional baseball pitcher for the Kansas City Royals of Major League Baseball (MLB). He made his MLB debut with the Minnesota Twins in 2019.

== Career ==
=== Amateur ===
Dobnak attended South Park High School in South Park Township, Pennsylvania. Dobnak attended Alderson Broaddus University in Philippi, West Virginia, where he played college baseball in NCAA Division II for the Battlers. Alderson Broaddus retired his uniform number in December 2021.

=== Utica Unicorns ===
Dobnak went undrafted out of college in 2017 and played for the Utica Unicorns of the United Shore Professional Baseball League. Dobnak had previously caught the attention of Utica manager Jim Essian when Dobnak played with Essian's son as a freshman and sophomore at Alderson Broaddus. Dobnak had a 3–0 record and 2.31 ERA in 6 appearances with Utica.

=== Minnesota Twins ===
On August 1, 2017, Dobnak signed a minor league contract, receiving a signing bonus of $500, with the Minnesota Twins off the strength of YouTube videos of his outings; the Twins never scouted him in person. He played for the Elizabethton Twins and the Cedar Rapids Kernels in 2017, combining to go 2–0 with a 2.43 ERA in 33 innings.

In 2018, Dobnak returned to Cedar Rapids, going 10–5 with a 3.14 ERA in 129 innings.

In 2019, Dobnak began the season with the High-A Fort Myers Miracle, then advanced to the Double-A Pensacola Blue Wahoos, and the Triple-A Rochester Red Wings. With those three teams in 2019, he compiled an overall 12–4 record with 2.07 ERA in 24 games (21 starts), while striking out 109 batters in 135 innings. On August 8, the Twins selected Dobnak's contract and promoted him to the major leagues. He made his debut on August 9, pitching four scoreless innings in relief. With the 2019 Twins, Dobnak was 2–1 with one save and a 1.59 ERA in nine appearances (five starts), while striking out 23 in 28 1/3 innings. He was included on the Twins' postseason roster and started Game 2 of the American League Division Series against the New York Yankees.

With the 2020 Minnesota Twins, Dobnak appeared in 10 games, with a 6–4 record, 4.05 ERA, and 27 strikeouts in 46 2/3 innings pitched.

On March 28, 2021, Dobnak and the Twins agreed to a five-year, $9.25 million extension that included three club option years with escalators that could have increased the total payout to $29.75 million. On July 17, Dobnak was placed on the 60-day injured list with a finger strain. On September 1, Dobnak was activated off of the injured list.

On March 21, 2022, Dobnak was placed on the 60-day injured list with discomfort in his right middle finger, the same finger in which he had suffered a strain in the year before. On September 14, the Twins placed Dobnak on outright waivers, and he was sent to the Triple-A St. Paul Saints.

Dobnak spent the 2023 season with Triple-A St. Paul. He appeared in 31 games (26 starts), with a 5–9 record, 5.13 ERA, and 115 strikeouts in 126 1/3 innings pitched.

On February 14, 2024, Dobnak joined the Twins in spring training as a non-roster invitee. In 21 games (19 starts) for St. Paul, he recorded a 9–5 record and 3.61 ERA with 102 strikeouts across 99 2/3 innings pitched. On July 30, the Twins selected Dobnak's contract, adding him to their active roster. In 4 games for the Twins, he compiled a 5.87 ERA with 7 strikeouts over 7 2/3 innings pitched. Dobnak was designated for assignment by Minnesota on September 16. He cleared waivers and was sent outright to St. Paul on September 18. On September 29, the Twins selected Dobnak's contract, adding him back to their active roster. On November 4, he was removed from the 40–man roster and sent outright to St. Paul.

On March 30, 2025, Dobnak pitched 5 1/3 innings against the St. Louis Cardinals, allowing only one run on two hits. Despite the performance, he was designated for assignment the next day following the promotion of Darren McCaughan. Dobnak cleared waivers and was sent outright to Triple-A St. Paul on April 2.

=== Detroit Tigers ===
On July 28, 2025, the Twins traded Dobnak and Chris Paddack to the Detroit Tigers in exchange for Enrique Jiménez. Dobnak made nine appearances (eight starts) for the Triple-A Toledo Mud Hens, posting a 1–1 record and 3.79 ERA with 35 strikeouts over 38 innings of work. Dobnak's 2026 option was declined by the Tigers on November 4, and he became a free agent.

=== Seattle Mariners ===
On November 11, 2025, Dobnak signed a minor league contract with the Seattle Mariners that included an invitation to spring training. Dobnak began the 2026 season with the Triple–A Tacoma Rainiers, compiling a 5–5 record and 4.24 ERA with 39 strikeouts in 70 innings pitched across 13 starts.

=== Kansas City Royals ===
On June 17, 2026, the Mariners traded Dobnak to the Kansas City Royals for cash considerations and they added him to their 40-man roster. On July 29, 2026, Dobnak threw seven scoreless innings against the Minnesota Twins, and the Royals won the game 4–0. It was his first win in the major leagues since May 21, 2021, when he played for the Twins.

== Legacy ==
Dobnak is regarded as one of the greatest players in USPBL history. Out of a total of 52 USPBL alumni who have signed with MLB organizations, Dobnak is one of seven players to have reached the major leagues. Dobnak's signing by longtime Twins scout Billy Milos marked a shift in the way the organization approached scouting independent baseball league players. Milos never watched Dobnak pitch in person at the time of his signing, solely watching YouTube videos filmed by Dobnak's father.

== Personal life ==
According to his LinkedIn profile, Dobnak began driving for Uber and Lyft in October 2017 — and he's an excellent driver with a "4.99/5 Uber driver rating," his Twitter profile reads. "I have all five star [reviews] except for one," Dobnak told MLB.com in August 2019. "I have one four-star. I'm hoping it was a mistake. I don't remember doing anything bad."

Dobnak and his wife were married on September 28, 2019, in Maryland. When Twins fans began sharing the link to their online wedding registry, the couple directed fans to instead donate to St. Jude Children's Research Hospital, raising over $4,000 for the hospital. They have a daughter. They reside in Falling Waters, West Virginia.

Dobnak grew up as a Pittsburgh Pirates fan, attending Opening Day annually and estimates having gone to over 150 games at PNC Park. He pitched at PNC Park for the first time on August 5, 2020, where he pitched 6 shutout innings and earned the victory in a 5–2 Twins win.

Dobnak is a fan and player of the fantasy massively multiplayer online role-playing game (MMORPG) RuneScape.
