= Carlos Rodríguez (Chilean footballer) =

Chilean footballer (born 1995)

Personal information
- Full name: Carlos Ignacio Rodríguez Flores
- Date of birth: 6 January 1995 (age 31)
- Place of birth: Chile
- Height: 1.73 m (5 ft 8 in)
- Position: Forward

Youth career
- Universidad Católica

Senior career*
Years	Team	Apps	(Gls)
2013–2017	Universidad Católica	0	(0)
2016–2017	→ Trasandino (loan)	17	(3)
2021	Deportes Colina	17	(1)
- * Club domestic league appearances and goals as of 8 August 2022

Carlos Ignacio Rodríguez Flores (born 6 January 1995) is a Chilean footballer who last played for Deportes Colina as a forward.

== Career ==
Universidad Católica were Rodríguez's first team. He was promoted into their squad during the 2013 Primera División of Chile season, appearing for his debut on 15 August during a goalless draw with Palestino in the Copa Chile. In 2016, Rodríguez was loaned to Trasandino of the Segunda División de Chile. Three goals, all three coming in 5–3 defeats to Barnechea and Deportes Santa Cruz, followed in seventeen appearances as Trasandino were relegated.

== Career statistics ==
As of 22 May 2018

Appearances and goals by club, season and competition
Club	Season	League			National cup (Note: Includes the Copa Chile)		League cup		Continental (Note: Includes the Copa Sudamericana)		Other		Total	
Club	Season	Division	Apps	Goals	Apps	Goals	Apps	Goals	Apps	Goals	Apps	Goals	Apps	Goals
Universidad Católica	2013–14	Primera División	0	0	1	0	—		—		0	0	1	0
Universidad Católica	2014–15	Primera División	0	0	0	0	—		0	0	0	0	0	0
Universidad Católica	2015–16	Primera División	0	0	0	0	—		0	0	0	0	0	0
Universidad Católica	2016–17	Primera División	0	0	0	0	—		0	0	0	0	0	0
Universidad Católica	Total		0	0	1	0	0	0	0	0	0	0	1	0
Trasandino (loan)	2016–17	Segunda División	17	3	0	0	—		—		0	0	17	3
Career total			17	3	1	0	0	0	0	0	0	0	18	3
