= José Luís (footballer, born 1908) =

Portuguese footballer

Personal information
- Full name: José Luis
- Date of birth: 1 October 1908
- Place of birth: Portugal
- Date of death: Deceased
- Position: Forward

Senior career*
Years	Team	Apps	(Gls)
1926–1940	Belenenses		

International career
1929–1933	Portugal	4	(0)
- * Club domestic league appearances and goals

José Luis (born 1 October 1908 - deceased) was a Portuguese footballer who played as forward.

Jose Luís gained 4 caps for Portugal and made his debut 1 December 1929 in Milan against Italy in a 1-6 defeat.
