= Carlos Rodríguez (footballer, born 1994) =

Mexican footballer (born 1994)

Personal information
- Full name: Carlos Rodríguez Chaires
- Date of birth: 8 August 1994 (age 32)
- Place of birth: Celaya, Mexico
- Height: 1.78 m (5 ft 10 in)
- Position: Forward

Youth career
- Celaya

Senior career*
| Years | Team | Apps | (Gls) |
| 2013 | Celaya | 0 | (0) |
| 2013–2014 | Celaya Premier | 10 | (1) |
- * Club domestic league appearances and goals

Carlos Rodríguez Chaires (born 8 August 1994) is a Mexican footballer who plays as a midfielder. He is currently a free agent.

== Career ==
Rodríguez's first senior club was Celaya, who he spent time with in his youth career. He made his professional debut with Celaya on 6 March 2013, featuring for the final twenty minutes of a 3–3 draw in the Copa MX against Mérida; having previously been an unused substitute for a match with the same opponents a week prior. In the following September, Rodríguez began playing for the club's reserve team in the third tier of Mexican football. He departed Celaya after one goal, versus Cachorros on 1 February 2014, in ten matches for their reserves.

== Career statistics ==
As of 22 May 2018.

Club statistics
| Club | Season | League | | | Cup (Note: Includes the Copa MX) | | League Cup | | Continental | | Other | | Total | |
| Club | Season | Division | Apps | Goals | Apps | Goals | Apps | Goals | Apps | Goals | Apps | Goals | Apps | Goals |
|---|---|---|---|---|---|---|---|---|---|---|---|---|---|---|
| Celaya | 2012–13 | Ascenso MX | 0 | 0 | 1 | 0 | — | | — | | 0 | 0 | 1 | 0 |
| Celaya Premier | 2013–14 | Liga Premier | 8 | 1 | 0 | 0 | — | | — | | 0 | 0 | 8 | 1 |
| Celaya Premier | 2014–15 | Liga Premier | 2 | 0 | 0 | 0 | — | | — | | 0 | 0 | 2 | 0 |
| Celaya Premier | Total | | 10 | 1 | 0 | 0 | — | | — | | 0 | 0 | 10 | 1 |
| Career total | | | 10 | 1 | 1 | 0 | — | | — | | 0 | 0 | 11 | 1 |
