= Cody Stashak =

American baseball player (born 1994)

- Pitcher
- Born: June 4, 1994 (age 32); Somers Point, New Jersey, U.S.
- Batted: Right Threw: Right

MLB debut
- July 23, 2019, for the Minnesota Twins

Last MLB appearance
- May 21, 2022, for the Minnesota Twins

MLB statistics
- Win–loss record: 4–1
- Earned run average: 4.13
- Strikeouts: 83
- Stats at Baseball Reference

Teams
- Minnesota Twins (2019–2022)

Cody William Stashak (born June 4, 1994) is an American former professional baseball pitcher. He played college baseball for Cumberland County College and St. John's University. Stashak was drafted by the Minnesota Twins in the 13th round of the 2015 Major League Baseball draft. He made his MLB debut for the Twins in 2019.

== Career ==
=== Amateur ===
Stashak attended Oakcrest High School ('12) in Mays Landing, New Jersey. He played college baseball for two seasons at Cumberland County College, where he went 16-5 with two no-hitters while helping the team finish second at the 2014 NJCAA Division III World Series, before transferring to St. John's University and helping it win the 2015 Big East title.

=== Minnesota Twins ===
Stashak was drafted by the Minnesota Twins in the 13th round, with the 380th overall selection, of the 2015 Major League Baseball draft.

Stashak played for the rookie–level Elizabethton Twins, posting a 5-2 record with a 3.43 ERA in 44 2/3 innings. His 2016 season was split between the Single–A Cedar Rapids Kernels and the High–A Fort Myers Miracle, posting a 10-5 record with a 2.80 ERA over 121 1/3 innings. He split the 2017 season between the rookie–level Gulf Coast Twins, Fort Myers, and the Double–A Chattanooga Lookouts, combining to go 4-4 with a 3.60 ERA in 94 1/3 innings. His 2018 season was split between Fort Myers and Chattanooga, going a combined 2-1 with a 2.87 ERA in 59 2/3 innings. He split the 2019 minor league season between the Double–A Pensacola Blue Wahoos and the Triple–A Rochester Red Wings, going a combined 7–3 with a 3.21 ERA over 53 innings.

On July 22, 2019, the Twins selected Stashak to the 40-man roster and promoted him to the major leagues for the first time. He made his debut on July 23, pitching two scoreless innings of relief versus the New York Yankees. In his rookie campaign, Stashak went 0–1 with a 3.24 ERA with 25 strikeouts over 24 innings of work.

In 2020 for the Twins, Stashak allowed three runs in seven innings for a 3.86 ERA before landing on the injured list. In his first two seasons in the majors, Stashak struck out 42 batters while allowing only four walks.

On June 25, 2021, Stashak was placed on the 60-day injured list with a left back disc injury. He made 15 total appearances for Minnesota in 2021, struggling to a 6.89 ERA with 26 strikeouts in 15 2/3 innings pitched.

Stashak pitched in 11 games for Minnesota in 2022, working to a 3-0 record and 3.86 ERA with 15 strikeouts in 16 1/3 innings of work. On June 8, 2022, it was announced that Stashak would undergo season-ending surgery to repair a torn labrum in his right throwing shoulder. On November 11, Stashak was removed from the 40-man roster and sent outright to the Triple–A St. Paul Saints; he elected free agency the same day.

=== Lancaster Barnstormers ===
On July 28, 2023, Stashak signed with the Lancaster Barnstormers of the Atlantic League of Professional Baseball. He made two scoreless appearances for Lancaster, striking out four and walking none in two innings of work.

=== San Francisco Giants ===
On August 10, 2023, Stashak's contract was purchased by the San Francisco Giants organization; he was subsequently assigned to the Triple–A Sacramento River Cats. In five games for Sacramento, he struggled to a 12.60 ERA with four strikeouts in five innings of work. On November 16, Stashak was released by the Giants organization.

On January 16, 2024, Stashak re-signed with the Giants on a minor league contract. In 27 games for Triple–A Sacramento, he recorded a 5.45 ERA with 44 strikeouts and 2 saves across 36 1/3 innings pitched. Stashak was released by the Giants organization again on August 13.

=== Piratas de Campeche ===
On October 30, 2024, Stashak signed a minor league contract with the Philadelphia Phillies organization. He was released prior to the start of the season on March 21, 2025.

On May 9, 2025, Stashak signed with the Piratas de Campeche of the Mexican League. In nine appearances for Campeche, Stashak logged a 3.38 ERA with six strikeouts across eight innings of relief.

=== Lancaster Stormers ===
On June 6, 2025, Stashak signed with the Lancaster Stormers of the Atlantic League of Professional Baseball. He made 21 appearances for Lancaster, compiling a 2–0 record and 1.99 ERA with 31 strikeouts and six saves across 22 2/3 innings pitched.

Stashak made six appearances for the Stormers in 2026, posting a 6.75 ERA with seven strikeouts across 5 1/3 innings pitched. On May 29, 2026, Stashak retired from professional baseball.
