= João Belo (footballer) =

Portuguese footballer (1910–1960)

Personal information
- Full name: João Pedro Bellard Belo
- Date of birth: 21 May 1910
- Place of birth: Portugal
- Date of death: 7 September 1960 (aged 50)
- Position: Defender

Senior career*
Years	Team	Apps	(Gls)
1932–1934	Belenenses		

International career
1933	Portugal	1	(0)
- * Club domestic league appearances and goals

João Pedro Bellard Belo (21 May 1910 – 7 September 1960) was a Portuguese footballer who played as defender.

== Football career ==
Belo gained one cap for Portugal against Spain 2 April 1933 in Vigo, in a 0–3 defeat.
