= Carlos Rodríguez (outfielder) =

Free agent
- Outfielder
- Born: December 7, 2000 (age 25); Valencia, Venezuela
- Bats: Left Throws: Left

Carlos David Rodríguez (born December 7, 2000) is a Venezuelan professional baseball outfielder who is a free agent.

== Career ==
On July 2, 2017, Rodríguez signed with the Milwaukee Brewers as an international free agent. He spent his first professional season in 2018 with the Dominican Summer League Brewers and rookie–level Arizona League Brewers. In 2019, Rodríguez played in 43 games split between the AZL Brewers and rookie–level Rocky Mountain Vibes, hitting a combined .330/.346/.416 with three home runs, 13 RBI, and five stolen bases. He did not play in a game in 2020 due to the cancellation of the minor league season because of the COVID-19 pandemic.

Rodríguez returned to action in 2021 with the High–A Wisconsin Timber Rattlers, appearing in 94 games and hitting .267/.336/.348 with one home run, 38 RBI, and 15 stolen bases. He returned to Wisconsin the following season, playing in 42 games and batting .268/.355/.416 with three home runs, 21 RBI, and 10 stolen bases. Rodríguez spent the 2023 campaign with the Double–A Biloxi Shuckers, playing in 115 games and slashing .291/.359/.367 with one home run, 43 RBI, and 14 stolen bases.

In 2024, Rodríguez played for Biloxi and the Triple–A Nashville Sounds, hitting .284/.368/.374 with career–highs in home runs (4), RBI (52), and stolen bases (17). He elected free agency following the season on November 4, 2024.

On November 22, 2024, Rodríguez signed a one–year, major league contract with the Atlanta Braves. He was optioned to the Triple-A Gwinnett Stripers to begin the 2025 season. In 138 appearances split between Gwinnett and the Double-A Columbus Clingstones, Rodríguez slashed a cumulative .254/.324/.326 with eight home runs, 37 RBI, and 20 stolen bases. On November 6, Rodríguez was removed from the 40-man roster and sent outright to Gwinnett; he subsequently rejected the assignment and elected free agency.

On November 21, 2025, Rodríguez signed a minor league contract with the San Diego Padres. In 124 games with Triple-A El Paso Chihuahuas he batted .308/.375/.416 with 6 home runs, 77 RBIs and 23 stolen bases. He elected free agency on November 2.
