= Carlos Rodrigues (footballer, born 1908) =

Portuguese footballer

Personal information
- Date of birth: 18 February 1908
- Place of birth: Portugal
- Date of death: Deceased
- Position: Midfielder

Senior career*
Years	Team	Apps	(Gls)
1928–1935	Belenenses		

International career
1929–1930	Portugal	3	(0)
- * Club domestic league appearances and goals

Carlos Rodrigues (born 18 February 1908, date of death unknown) was a Portuguese footballer who played as midfielder.

== International career ==
Rodrigues gained 3 caps for Portugal and made his debut 1 December 1929 in Milan against Italy, in a 1–6 defeat.
