= Alfredo Ramos (Portuguese footballer) =

Portuguese footballer

Personal information
- Date of birth: 15 February 1906
- Place of birth: Portugal
- Position: Forward

Senior career*
| Years | Team | Apps | (Gls) |
| 1927–1930 | Belenenses | | |

International career
| 1928–1929 | Portugal | 4 | (0) |
- * Club domestic league appearances and goals

Alfredo Ramos (born 15 February 1906, date of death unknown) was a Portuguese association footballer who played as a forward.

== Football career ==
Ramos gained four caps for Portugal, and made his debut on 1 April 1928 in Lisbon against Argentina, in a 0–0 draw. He was a non-playing member of Portugal's squad at the 1928 Olympic football tournament.
