= Caleb Thielbar =

American baseball player (born 1987)

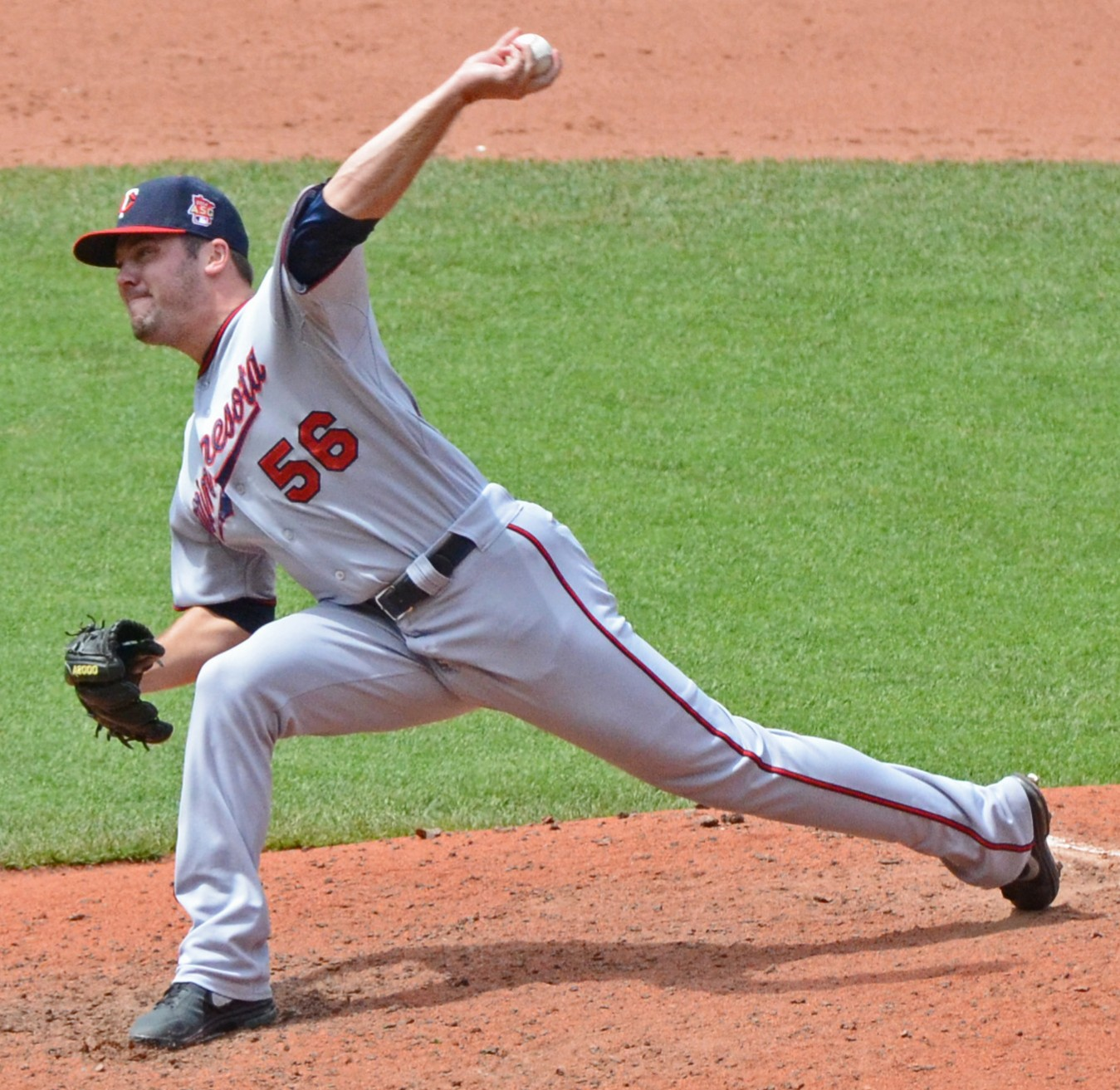
- Thielbar pitching for the Minnesota Twins in 2014

Free agent
- Pitcher
- Born: January 31, 1987 (age 39); Northfield, Minnesota, U.S.
- Bats: Right Throws: Left

MLB debut
- May 20, 2013, for the Minnesota Twins

MLB statistics (through 2026 season)
- Win–loss record: 29–20
- Earned run average: 3.45
- Strikeouts: 463
- Stats at Baseball Reference

Teams
- Minnesota Twins (2013–2015, 2020–2024); Chicago Cubs (2025–2026)

Caleb John Thielbar (born January 31, 1987) is an American professional baseball pitcher who is a free agent. He has previously played in MLB for the Minnesota Twins and Chicago Cubs. He made his MLB debut with the Twins in 2013.

== Career ==
Thielbar attended Randolph High School in Randolph, Minnesota, and South Dakota State University, where he played college baseball for the South Dakota State Jackrabbits.

=== Milwaukee Brewers ===
The Milwaukee Brewers drafted Thielbar in the 18th round, with the 556th overall selection, of the 2009 Major League Baseball draft. He made 16 appearances split between the rookie–level Arizona League Brewers and rookie–level Helena Brewers, registering a combined 6–1 record and 1.53 ERA with 48 strikeouts across 47 innings pitched.

Thielbar split the 2010 campaign between Helena and the Single–A Wisconsin Timber Rattlers. In 39 appearances out of the bullpen for the two affiliates, he compiled an 0–2 record and 5.19 ERA with 52 strikeouts and 3 saves across 67 2/3 innings of work. Thielbar was released by the Brewers organization on December 13, 2010.

=== St. Paul Saints ===
Thielbar signed with the St. Paul Saints of the American Association of Professional Baseball, an independent baseball league, prior to the 2011 season. In 43 relief outings for the Saints, he logged a 3–3 record and 2.54 ERA with 62 strikeouts across 49 2/3 innings pitched.

=== Minnesota Twins ===
On August 19, 2011, Thielbar signed a minor league contract with the Minnesota Twins organization. He made three scoreless appearances for the High–A Fort Myers Miracle down the stretch. Thielbar split the 2012 campaign between Fort Myers, the Double–A New Britain Rock Cats, and Triple–A Rochester Red Wings, accumulating a 6–2 record and 2.43 ERA with 74 strikeouts and 6 saves across 48 appearances. On November 20, 2012, the Twins added Thielbar to their 40-man roster to protect him from the Rule 5 draft.

On May 20, 2013, Twins promoted Thielbar to the major leagues for the first time. He made his MLB debut that day, pitching two innings, and became the first South Dakota State baseball player to reach MLB. He remained in the Twins bullpen for the remainder of the season, appearing in 49 games and pitching 46 innings with a 1.76 ERA and 0.826 WHIP.

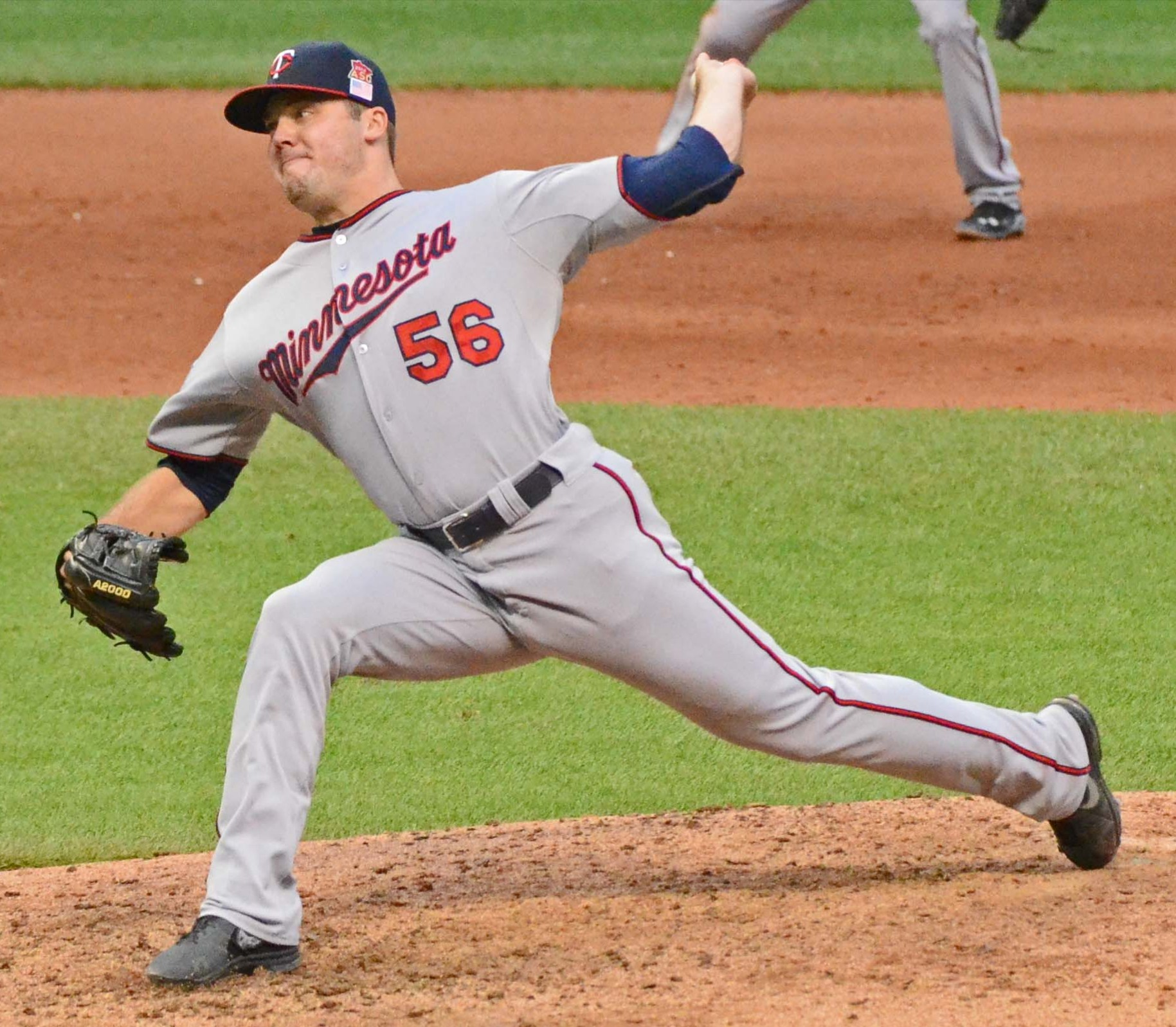
Thielbar pitching for the Twins in 2014

Thielbar began the 2014 season in the Twins bullpen, making 54 appearances in which he pitched 47 2/3 and pitching to a 3.40 ERA. In 2015, he pitched five innings for the team. On July 31, 2015, he was designated for assignment after appearing in just 6 games.

=== San Diego Padres ===
On August 8, 2015, San Diego Padres claimed Thielbar off waivers from the Twins. The Padres assigned him to their Triple-A affiliate, the El Paso Chihuahuas, for whom he pitched 12 1/3 innings, giving up only one earned run. He was designated for assignment on August 30. Thielbar cleared waivers and was sent outright to Triple-A El Paso on September 3.

=== St. Paul Saints (second stint) ===
On March 29, 2016, Thielbar signed with the St. Paul Saints of the American Association of Independent Professional Baseball. He was 5-2 with four saves, 56 strikeouts, and a 2.39 ERA in 64 innings.

On November 17, 2016, Thielbar signed a minor league contract with the Miami Marlins. He was released prior to the start of the season on March 31, 2017. On May 27, Thielbar signed with St. Paul for the rest of the 2017 season. He was 2-1 with one save and a 2.01 ERA in 22 1/3 innings in which he struck out 23 batters.

=== Detroit Tigers ===
On January 23, 2018, Thielbar signed a minor league deal with the Detroit Tigers. He split the season between the Double–A Erie SeaWolves and the Triple–A Toledo Mud Hens, and was a combined 7-1 with a 2.05 ERA in 57 innings.

On October 30, 2018, Thielbar re–signed with Detroit on a minor league contract. He was assigned to Triple–A Toledo for the 2019 season, for whom he was 2-1 with four saves and a 3.30 ERA, as in 76 1/3 innings he struck out 92 batters.

=== Atlanta Braves ===
On August 30, 2019, Thielbar was traded to the Atlanta Braves in exchange for cash considerations. He pitched two scoreless innings and had one save for the Triple–A Gwinnett Stripers. He elected free agency following the season on November 4.

After the season, on October 10, he was selected for the United States national baseball team in the 2019 WBSC Premier 12. Expecting that his playing career was over, he accepted a position as a pitching coach with Augustana University.

=== Minnesota Twins (second stint) ===
On December 13, 2019, Thielbar signed a minor league contract with the Minnesota Twins. On August 3, 2020, the Twins selected Thielbar to the active roster. The next day, he made his first appearance of the season and first in the majors in a little over five years. He finished the season with a 2.25 ERA and 22 strikeouts in 17 games.

Thielbar signed a one-year, $650,000 contract with Minnesota for the 2021 season. He pitched in 59 games for the team, registering a 7-0 record and 3.23 ERA with 77 strikeouts over 64 innings of work. Thielbar made 67 appearances out of the bullpen for the Twins during the 2022 season, accumulating a 4-3 record and 3.49 ERA with 80 strikeouts across 59 1/3 innings pitched.

On January 13, 2023, Thielbar agreed to a one-year, $2.4 million contract with the Twins, avoiding salary arbitration. He made 36 appearances for Minnesota, compiling a 3-1 record and 3.23 ERA with 36 strikeouts across 30 2/3 innings of work. In 59 relief appearances for the team in 2024, Thielbar logged a 5.32 ERA with 53 strikeouts and 3 saves across 47 1/3 innings pitched.

=== Chicago Cubs ===
On December 31, 2024, Thielbar signed a one-year, $2.75 million contract with the Chicago Cubs. He made 67 appearances out of the bullpen for Chicago during the 2025 season, registering a 3-4 record and 2.64 ERA with 56 strikeouts and one save over 58 innings of work.

On December 17, 2025, Thielbar re-signed with the Cubs on a one-year, $4.5 million contract. On November 2, the Cubs declined their mutual option on Thielbar making him a free agent.

== Personal life ==
Thielbar and his wife Carissa have one son together.
