= Edwar Colina =

Venezuelan baseball player (born 1997)

Guerreros de Oaxaca – No. 44
- Pitcher
- Born: May 3, 1997 (age 29); Caracas, Venezuela
- Bats: Right Throws: Right

MLB debut
- September 25, 2020, for the Minnesota Twins

MLB statistics (through 2020 season)
- Win–loss record: 0-0
- Earned run average: 81.00
- Strikeouts: 0
- Stats at Baseball Reference

Teams
- Minnesota Twins (2020)

Edwar Osnel de la Cruz Colina (born May 3, 1997) is a Venezuelan professional baseball pitcher for the Guerreros de Oaxaca of the Mexican League. He has previously played in Major League Baseball (MLB) for the Minnesota Twins.

== Career ==
=== Minnesota Twins ===
Colina signed with the Minnesota Twins as an international free agent on September 29, 2015. He made his professional debut in 2016 with the Dominican Summer League Twins. In 2017, Colina made 12 appearances (11 starts) for the rookie-level Elizabethton Twins, posting a 3-5 record and 3.34 ERA with 56 strikeouts across 59 1/3 innings pitched.

Colina split the 2018 season between the Single-A Cedar Rapids Kernels and High-A Fort Myers Miracle, accumulating a 7-5 record and 2.63 ERA with 106 strikeouts across 21 total appearances (20 starts). He split the 2019 campaign between Fort Myers, the Double-A Pensacola Blue Wahoos, and the Triple-A Rochester Red Wings. In 19 appearances (14 starts) for the three affiliates, Colina compiled an 8-2 record and 2.96 ERA with 102 strikeouts across 97 1/3 innings pitched.

Colina was not assigned to an affiliate to begin the 2020 season due to the cancellation of the minor league season because of the COVID-19 pandemic. On September 25, 2020, Colina was selected to the 40-man roster and promoted to the major leagues for the first time. He made his debut that day for the Twins, but gave up three runs in 1/3 of an inning.

On April 7, 2021, Colina was placed on the 60-day injured list with inflammation in his right elbow.

=== Texas Rangers ===
On October 6, 2021, Colina was claimed off waivers by the Texas Rangers. On November 19, Colina was outrighted off the Rangers active roster. He did not make an appearance for the organization during the 2022 season.

Colina spent all of 2023 with the Triple–A Round Rock Express, compiling a 4.65 ERA with 30 strikeouts in 31 innings across 26 appearances. He elected free agency following the season on November 6, 2023.

=== Saraperos de Saltillo ===
On September 19, 2024, Colina signed with the Saraperos de Saltillo of the Mexican League. He made 10 appearances for Saltillo, but struggled to a 9.00 ERA with 8 strikeouts over 10 innings of work. Colina was released by the Saraperos on May 27, 2025.

=== Rieleros de Aguascalientes ===
On June 7, 2025, Colina signed with the Rieleros de Aguascalientes of the Mexican League. In nine appearances for Aguascalientes, Colina logged a 1-0 record and 9.60 ERA with 15 strikeouts over 15 innings of work.

=== Guerreros de Oaxaca ===
On July 11, 2025, Colina was traded to the Guerreros de Oaxaca of the Mexican League. In eight appearances (including one start) for Oaxaca, he posted a 3–0 record and 0.63 ERA with 15 strikeouts across 14 1/3 innings pitched.
