= 2025 Tampa Bay Rays season =

Major League Baseball season

2025 Tampa Bay Rays
- League: American League
- Division: East
- Ballpark: George M. Steinbrenner Field
- City: Tampa, Florida
- Record: 77–85 (.475)
- Divisional place: 4th
- Owners: Stuart Sternberg
- President of baseball operations: Erik Neander
- Manager: Kevin Cash
- Television: FanDuel Sports Network Sun
- Radio: Tampa Bay Rays Radio Network (English); WGES (Spanish)

The 2025 Tampa Bay Rays season was the 28th season of the Tampa Bay Rays franchise, as members of Major League Baseball's American League East Division.

The 2025 season was slated to be the Rays’ 28th season playing at Tropicana Field; however, the stadium was heavily damaged during the passage of Hurricane Milton, rendering it unusable for the entirety of the season. On November 14, 2024, the Rays announced that they would play their 2025 home games at George M. Steinbrenner Field in Tampa, the spring training home of the New York Yankees. It is the first time an MLB team has been temporarily displaced from their home stadium since 2021, when the Toronto Blue Jays had to play in stadiums in Buffalo, New York and Dunedin, Florida because of travel restrictions imposed by the Canadian government during the COVID-19 pandemic.

The Rays spent most of the season above .500, the high point of which was a 47–36 record on June 28, but collapsed in the second half to finish with a losing season. On September 19, the Rays were eliminated from playoff contention for the second straight season following a loss to the division rival Boston Red Sox.

The 2025 season was the last under the majority ownership of Stuart Sternberg, who reached an agreement to sell his majority ownership of the Rays to a group headed by Patrick Zalupski in September. Sternberg had been the majority owner of the Rays since 2005.

== Season standings ==
=== American League East ===
AL East
Team	W	L	Pct.	GB	Home	Road
Toronto Blue Jays	94	68	.580	—	54‍–‍27	40‍–‍41
New York Yankees	94	68	.580	—	50‍–‍31	44‍–‍37
Boston Red Sox	89	73	.549	5	48‍–‍33	41‍–‍40
Tampa Bay Rays	77	85	.475	17	41‍–‍40	36‍–‍45
Baltimore Orioles	75	87	.463	19	39‍–‍42	36‍–‍45

=== American League Wild Card ===
Division leaders
Team	W	L	Pct.
Toronto Blue Jays	94	68	.580
Seattle Mariners	90	72	.556
Cleveland Guardians	88	74	.543

Wild Card teams (Top 3 teams qualify for postseason)
Team	W	L	Pct.	GB
New York Yankees	94	68	.580	+7
Boston Red Sox	89	73	.549	+2
Detroit Tigers	87	75	.537	—
Houston Astros	87	75	.537	—
Kansas City Royals	82	80	.506	5
Texas Rangers	81	81	.500	6
Tampa Bay Rays	77	85	.475	10
Athletics	76	86	.469	11
Baltimore Orioles	75	87	.463	12
Los Angeles Angels	72	90	.444	15
Minnesota Twins	70	92	.432	17
Chicago White Sox	60	102	.370	27

=== Record vs. opponents ===
==== Record vs. American League ====
2025 American League record Source: MLB Standings Grid – 2025
Team	ATH	BAL	BOS	CWS	CLE	DET	HOU	KC	LAA	MIN	NYY	SEA	TB	TEX	TOR	NL
Athletics	—	4–2	3–3	5–1	2–4	4–2	8–5	4–2	4–9	4–3	2–4	6–7	3–3	5–8	2–5	20–28
Baltimore	2–4	—	5–8	6–0	3–4	1–5	3–4	2–4	5–1	0–6	4–9	5–1	7–6	2–4	6–7	24–24
Boston	3–3	8–5	—	4–3	4–2	2–4	4–2	4–2	1–5	3–3	9–4	3–3	10–3	3–4	5–8	26–22
Chicago	1–5	0–6	3–4	—	2–11	5–8	3–3	3–10	3–3	8–5	1–6	1–5	4–2	2–4	3–3	21–27
Cleveland	4–2	4–3	2–4	11–2	—	8–5	4–2	8–5	3–3	9–4	3–3	2–4	5–2	2–4	3–3	20–28
Detroit	2–4	5–1	4–2	8–5	5–8	—	4–2	9–4	5–2	8–5	4–2	2–4	3–3	2–4	3–4	23–25
Houston	5–8	4–3	2–4	3–3	2–4	2–4	—	3–3	8–5	5–1	3-3	5–8	3–4	7–6	4–2	31–17
Kansas City	2–4	4–2	2–4	10–3	5–8	4–9	3–3	—	3–3	7–6	0–6	3–4	3–3	6-1	4–2	26–22
Los Angeles	9–4	1–5	5–1	3–3	3–3	2–5	5–8	3–3	—	2–4	3–4	4–9	3–3	5–8	2–4	22–26
Minnesota	3–4	6–0	3–3	5–8	4–9	5–8	1–5	6–7	4–2	—	2–4	3–4	3–3	3–3	2–4	20–28
New York	4–2	9–4	4–9	6–1	3–3	2–4	3–3	6–0	4–3	4–2	—	5–1	9–4	4–2	5–8	26–22
Seattle	7–6	1–5	3–3	5–1	4–2	4–2	8–5	4–3	9–4	4–3	1–5	—	3–3	10–3	2–4	25–23
Tampa Bay	3–3	6–7	3–10	2–4	2–5	3–3	4–3	3–3	3–3	3–3	4–9	3–3	—	3–3	7–6	28–20
Texas	8–5	4–2	4–3	4–2	4–2	4–2	6–7	1-6	8–5	3–3	2–4	3–10	3–3	—	2–4	25–23
Toronto	5–2	7–6	8–5	3–3	3–3	4–3	2–4	2–4	4–2	4–2	8–5	4–2	6–7	4–2	—	30–18

Updated with the results of all games through September 28, 2025.

==== Record vs. National League ====
2025 American League record vs. National League Source: MLB Standings
Team	AZ	ATL	CHC	CIN	COL	LAD	MIA	MIL	NYM	PHI	PIT	SD	SF	STL	WSH
Athletics	1–2	2–1	0–3	3–0	2–1	1–2	2–1	1–2	1–2	1–2	1–2	1–2	1–5	1–2	2–1
Baltimore	1–2	3–0	1–2	1–2	2–1	2–1	1–2	1–2	2–1	1–2	3–0	3–0	1–2	1–2	1–5
Boston	1–2	3–3	1–2	2–1	3–0	2–1	2–1	0–3	2–1	1–2	1–2	1–2	1–2	3–0	3–0
Chicago	1–2	1–2	1–5	2–1	2–1	0–3	2–1	1–2	1–2	2–1	3–0	1–2	2–1	0–3	2–1
Cleveland	1–2	0–3	0–3	1–5	2–1	1–2	2–1	2–1	3–0	1–2	3–0	0–3	2–1	0–3	2–1
Detroit	3–0	0–3	2–1	1–2	3–0	0–3	1–2	1–2	1–2	1–2	2–4	2–1	3–0	2–1	1–2
Houston	3–0	2–1	2–1	2–1	4–2	3–0	2–1	1–2	2–1	3–0	2–1	2–1	0–3	1–2	2–1
Kansas City	2–1	2–1	2–1	1–2	3–0	1–2	1–2	1–2	1–2	1–2	3–0	1–2	2–1	3–3	2–1
Los Angeles	2–1	2–1	0–3	1–2	1–2	6–0	1–2	0–3	0–3	2–1	1–2	1–2	2–1	2–1	1–2
Minnesota	1–2	0–3	2–1	1–2	1–2	1–2	1–2	2–4	2–1	1–2	2–1	2–1	3–0	0–3	1–2
New York	1–2	2–1	1–2	1–2	2–1	1–2	0–3	3–0	3–3	1–2	2–1	2–1	1–2	3–0	3–0
Seattle	0–3	2–1	2–1	2–1	3–0	0–3	2–1	1–2	1–2	0–3	3–0	5–1	0–3	3–0	1–2
Tampa Bay	2–1	2–1	1–2	0–3	2–1	1–2	3–3	2–1	3–0	0–3	2–1	3–0	2–1	2–1	3–0
Texas	2–4	3–0	1–2	2–1	3–0	1–2	0–3	3–0	2–1	0–3	2–1	1–2	1–2	2–1	2–1
Toronto	2–1	2–1	2–1	2–1	3–0	1–2	2–1	1–2	0–3	2–4	1–2	3–0	3–0	3–0	3–0

Updated with the results of all games through September 28, 2025.

== Game log ==
=== Regular season ===
Legend
	Rays win
	Rays loss
	Postponement
	Eliminated from playoff contention
**Bold**	Rays team member

2025 Game Log: 77–85 (Home: 41–40; Away: 36–45)
March/April: 14–16 (Home: 9–12; Away: 5–4)

#	Date	Opponent	Score	Win	Loss	Save	Venue	Attendance	Record	Streak/ Box
1	March 28	Rockies	3–2	**Fairbanks** (1–0)	Vodnik (0–1)	—	**George M. Steinbrenner Field**	10,046	1–0	W1
2	March 29	Rockies	1–2	Peralta (1–0)	**Littell** (0–1)	Halvorsen (1)	**George M. Steinbrenner Field**	10,046	1–1	L1
3	March 30	Rockies	6–4	**Bradley** (1–0)	Peralta (1–1)	**Fairbanks** (1)	**George M. Steinbrenner Field**	10,046	2–1	W1
4	March 31	Pirates	6–1	**Rasmussen** (1–0)	Mlodzinski (0–1)	—	**George M. Steinbrenner Field**	10,046	3–1	W2
5	April 1	Pirates	7–0	**Baz** (1–0)	Harrington (0–1)	—	**George M. Steinbrenner Field**	10,046	4–1	W3
6	April 2	Pirates	2–4	Skenes (1–0)	**Pepiot** (0–1)	Santana (1)	**George M. Steinbrenner Field**	10,046	4–2	L1
7	April 4	@ Rangers	2–5	Mahle (1–0)	**Littell** (0–2)	Jackson (4)	Globe Life Field	24,483	4–3	L2
8	April 5	@ Rangers	4–6	Garcia (1–0)	**Montgomery** (0–1)	Jackson (5)	Globe Life Field	29,058	4–4	L3
9	April 6	@ Rangers	3–4	Webb (1–0)	**Uceta** (0–1)	—	Globe Life Field	25,614	4–5	L4
10	April 8	Angels	3–4	Burke (2–0)	**Fairbanks** (1–1)	Jansen (3)	**George M. Steinbrenner Field**	10,046	4–6	L5
11	April 9	Angels	5–4	**Pepiot** (1–1)	Kikuchi (0–2)	**Fairbanks** (2)	**George M. Steinbrenner Field**	10,046	5–6	W1
12	April 10	Angels	1–11	Soriano (2–1)	**Littell** (0–3)	—	**George M. Steinbrenner Field**	10,046	5–7	L1
13	April 11	Braves	6–3	**Bradley** (2–0)	Elder (0–1)	**Fairbanks** (3)	**George M. Steinbrenner Field**	10,046	6–7	W1
14	April 12	Braves	4–5	Lee (1–1)	**Sulser** (0–1)	Iglesias (2)	**George M. Steinbrenner Field**	10,046	6–8	L1
15	April 13	Braves	8–3	**Boyle** (1–0)	Sale (0–2)	—	**George M. Steinbrenner Field**	10,046	7–8	W1
16	April 14	Red Sox	16–1	**Baz** (2–0)	Houck (0–2)	—	**George M. Steinbrenner Field**	10,046	8–8	W2
17	April 15	Red Sox	4–7	Buehler (2–1)	**Pepiot** (1–2)	Chapman (4)	**George M. Steinbrenner Field**	10,046	8–9	L1
18	April 16	Red Sox	0–1	Weissert (1–0)	**Littell** (0–4)	Slaten (2)	**George M. Steinbrenner Field**	10,046	8–10	L2
19	April 17	Yankees	3–6	Hill (2–0)	**Bradley** (2–1)	Williams (4)	**George M. Steinbrenner Field**	10,046	8–11	L3
20	April 18	Yankees	0–1	Rodón (2–3)	**Rasmussen** (1–1)	Weaver (2)	**George M. Steinbrenner Field**	10,046	8–12	L4
21	April 19	Yankees	10–8 (10)	**Uceta** (1–1)	Gómez (1–1)	—	**George M. Steinbrenner Field**	10,046	9–12	W1
22	April 20	Yankees	0–4	Fried (4–0)	**Pepiot** (1–3)	Cruz (2)	**George M. Steinbrenner Field**	10,046	9–13	L1
23	April 22	@ Diamondbacks	1–5	Pfaadt (4–1)	**Littell** (0–5)	—	Chase Field	21,810	9–14	L2
24	April 23	@ Diamondbacks	7–6 (11)	**Fairbanks** (2–1)	Jameson (0–1)	**Orze** (1)	Chase Field	16,100	10–14	W1
25	April 24	@ Diamondbacks	7–4 (10)	**Uceta** (2–1)	Feyereisen (0–1)	**Fairbanks** (4)	Chase Field	20,661	11–14	W2
26	April 25	@ Padres	1–0	**Baz** (3–0)	King (3–1)	**Cleavinger** (1)	Petco Park	43,319	12–14	W3
27	April 26	@ Padres	4–1	**Pepiot** (2–3)	Cease (1–2)	**Fairbanks** (5)	Petco Park	44,768	13–14	W4
28	April 27	@ Padres	4–2	**Littell** (1–5)	Vásquez (1–3)	**Fairbanks** (6)	Petco Park	42,221	14–14	W5
29	April 29	Royals	1–3	Lorenzen (3–3)	**Bradley** (2–2)	Estévez (8)	**George M. Steinbrenner Field**	10,046	14–15	L1
30	April 30	Royals	0–3	Cameron (1–0)	**Rasmussen** (1–2)	Estévez (9)	**George M. Steinbrenner Field**	10,046	14–16	L2

May: 16–12 (Home: 9–7; Road: 7–5)

#	Date	Opponent	Score	Win	Loss	Save	Venue	Attendance	Record	Streak/ Box
31	May 1	Royals	2–8	Lugo (3–3)	**Baz** (3–1)	—	**George M. Steinbrenner Field**	8,794	14–17	L3
32	May 2	@ Yankees	0–3	Fried (6–0)	**Pepiot** (2–4)	Weaver (3)	Yankee Stadium	45,189	14–18	L4
33	May 3	@ Yankees	3–2	**Littell** (2–5)	Leiter Jr. (2–3)	**Fairbanks** (7)	Yankee Stadium	44,051	15–18	W1
34	May 4	@ Yankees	7–5	**Bradley** (3–2)	Warren (1–2)	**Fairbanks** (8)	Yankee Stadium	43,349	16–18	W2
35	May 6	Phillies	4–8	Wheeler (3–1)	**Rasmussen** (1–3)	—	**George M. Steinbrenner Field**	10,046	16–19	L1
36	May 7	Phillies	0–7	Sánchez (4–1)	**Baz** (3–2)	Walker (1)	**George M. Steinbrenner Field**	10,046	16–20	L2
37	May 8	Phillies	6–7 (10)	Alvarado (4–1)	**Rodríguez** (0–1)	Strahm (2)	**George M. Steinbrenner Field**	10,046	16–21	L3
38	May 9	Brewers	4–3	**Sulser** (1–1)	Koenig (2–1)	**Orze** (2)	**George M. Steinbrenner Field**	10,046	17–21	W1
39	May 10	Brewers	3–2	**Fairbanks** (3–1)	Anderson (1–2)	—	**George M. Steinbrenner Field**	10,046	18–21	W2
40	May 11	Brewers	2–4	Alexander (2–3)	**Rasmussen** (1–4)	Megill (5)	**George M. Steinbrenner Field**	10,046	18–22	L1
41	May 13	@ Blue Jays	11–9	**Uceta** (3–1)	Hoffman (3–2)	**Montgomery** (1)	Rogers Centre	27,717	19–22	W1
42	May 14	@ Blue Jays	1–3	Little (2–0)	**Pepiot** (2–5)	García (3)	Rogers Centre	22,314	19–23	L1
43	May 15	@ Blue Jays	8–3	**Littell** (3–5)	Gausman (3–4)	—	Rogers Centre	22,856	20–23	W1
44	May 16	@ Marlins	4–9	Meyer (3–4)	**Bradley** (3–3)	—	LoanDepot Park	11,714	20–24	L1
45	May 17	@ Marlins	4–0	**Rasmussen** (2–4)	Alcántara (2–6)	—	LoanDepot Park	12,052	21–24	W1
46	May 18	@ Marlins	1–5	Quantrill (3–4)	**Baz** (3–3)	—	LoanDepot Park	10,529	21–25	L1
47	May 19	Astros	3–4	King (2–0)	**Rodríguez** (0–2)	Hader (12)	**George M. Steinbrenner Field**	10,046	21–26	L2
48	May 20	Astros	3–2	**Rodríguez** (1–2)	Ort (1–1)	—	**George M. Steinbrenner Field**	10,046	22–26	W1
49	May 21	Astros	8–4	**Bradley** (4–3)	Brown (6–3)	—	**George M. Steinbrenner Field**	8,596	23–26	W2
50	May 23	Blue Jays	3–1	**Rasmussen** (3–4)	Lauer (1–1)	**Fairbanks** (9)	**George M. Steinbrenner Field**	10,046	24–26	W3
51	May 24	Blue Jays	3–1	**Baz** (4–3)	Berríos (1–2)	**Fairbanks** (10)	**George M. Steinbrenner Field**	10,046	25–26	W4
52	May 25	Blue Jays	13–0	**Pepiot** (3–5)	Bassitt (4–3)	—	**George M. Steinbrenner Field**	10,046	26–26	W5
53	May 26	Twins	7–2	**Littell** (4–5)	Paddack (2–5)	—	**George M. Steinbrenner Field**	8,759	27–26	W6
54	May 27	Twins	2–4	Ryan (5–2)	**Bradley** (4–4)	Durán (9)	**George M. Steinbrenner Field**	10,046	27–27	L1
55	May 28	Twins	5–0	**Rasmussen** (4–4)	López (4–3)	—	**George M. Steinbrenner Field**	8,372	28–27	W1
56	May 29	@ Astros	13–3	**Uceta** (5–3)	King (3–1)	—	Daikin Park	29,661	29–27	W2
57	May 30	@ Astros	1–2	Valdez (5–4)	**Cleavinger** (0–1)	—	Daikin Park	32,115	29–28	L1
58	May 31	@ Astros	16–3	**Littell** (5–5)	Gordon (0–1)	—	Daikin Park	33,033	30–28	W1

June: 17–10 (Home: 9–5; Road: 8–5)

#	Date	Opponent	Score	Win	Loss	Save	Venue	Attendance	Record	Streak/ Box
59	June 1	@ Astros	0–1	Brown (8–3)	**Bradley** (4–5)	Hader (15)	Daikin Park	33,938	30–29	L1
60	June 3	Rangers	5–1	**Rasmussen** (5–4)	Mahle (5–3)	—	**George M. Steinbrenner Field**	9,131	31–29	W1
61	June 4	Rangers	5–4	**Baz** (5–3)	Rocker (1–4)	**Fairbanks** (11)	**George M. Steinbrenner Field**	8,994	32–29	W2
62	June 5	Rangers	4–3	**Sulser** (2–1)	Garcia (1–3)	—	**George M. Steinbrenner Field**	10,046	33–29	W3
63	June 6	Marlins	4–3	**Littell** (6–5)	Cabrera (2–2)	**Fairbanks** (12)	**George M. Steinbrenner Field**	8,448	34–29	W4
64	June 7	Marlins	10–11 (10)	Gibson (1–3)	**Cleavinger** (0–2)	—	**George M. Steinbrenner Field**	10,046	34–30	L1
65	June 8	Marlins	3–2	**Uceta** (5–1)	Bellozo (1–3)	—	**George M. Steinbrenner Field**	9,014	35–30	W1
66	June 9	@ Red Sox	10–8 (11)	**Seymour** (1–0)	Kelly (1–3)	—	Fenway Park	31,422	36–30	W2
67	June 10	@ Red Sox	1–3	Giolito (2–1)	**Pepiot** (3–6)	Weissert (1)	Fenway Park	31,917	36–31	L1
68	June 11	@ Red Sox	3–4	Buehler (5–4)	**Littell** (6–6)	Chapman (12)	Fenway Park	36,003	36–32	L2
69	June 13	@ Mets	7–5	**Orze** (1–0)	Kranick (3–2)	**Fairbanks** (13)	Citi Field	41,622	37–32	W1
70	June 14	@ Mets	8–4	**Rasmussen** (6–4)	Megill (5–5)	—	Citi Field	41,662	38–32	W2
71	June 15	@ Mets	9–0	**Baz** (6–3)	Canning (6–3)	—	Citi FIeld	42,804	39–32	W3
72	June 16	Orioles	7–1	**Pepiot** (4–6)	Eflin (6–3)	—	**George M. Steinbrenner Field**	10,046	40–32	W4
73	June 17	Orioles	1–5	Kremer (6–7)	**Littell** (6–7)	—	**George M. Steinbrenner Field**	10,046	40–33	L1
74	June 18	Orioles	12–8	**Montgomery** (1–1)	Kittredge (1–1)	—	**George M. Steinbrenner Field**	10,046	41–33	W1
75	June 19	Orioles	1–4	Morton (4–7)	**Rasmussen** (6–5)	Bautista (15)	**George M. Steinbrenner Field**	10,046	41–34	L1
76	June 20	Tigers	14–8	**Baz** (7–3)	Flaherty (5–8)	—	**George M. Steinbrenner Field**	10,046	42–34	W1
77	June 21	Tigers	8–3	**Pepiot** (5–6)	Hurter (2–3)	—	**George M. Steinbrenner Field**	10,046	43–34	W2
78	June 22	Tigers	3–9	Holton (3–3)	**Cleavinger** (0–3)	—	**George M. Steinbrenner Field**	10,046	43–35	L1
79	June 24	@ Royals	5–1	**Bradley** (5–5)	Bubic (6–5)	—	Kauffman Stadium	22,951	44–35	W1
80	June 25	@ Royals	3–0	**Rasmussen** (7–5)	Wacha (4–7)	**Fairbanks** (14)	Kauffman Stadium	20,649	45–35	W2
81	June 26	@ Royals	4–0	**Baz** (8–3)	Lorenzen (4–8)	**Fairbanks** (15)	Kauffman Stadium	19,619	46–35	W3
82	June 27	@ Orioles	8–22	Sugano (6–4)	**Orze** (1–1)	—	Camden Yards	20,047	46–36	L1
83	June 28	@ Orioles	11–3	**Littell** (7–7)	Eflin (6–5)	—	Camden Yards	30,491	47–36	W1
84	June 29	@ Orioles	1–5	Kremer (7–7)	Bradley (5–6)	—	Camden Yards	19,226	47–37	L1
85	June 30	Athletics	4–6	Newcomb (2–4)	**Fairbanks** (3–2)	Miller (16)	**George M. Steinbrenner Field**	10,046	47–38	L2

July: 7–18 (Home: 4–4; Road: 3–14)

#	Date	Opponent	Score	Win	Loss	Save	Venue	Attendance	Record	Streak/ Box
86	July 1	Athletics	3–4 (10)	Kelly (2–0)	**Montgomery** (1–2)	Miller (17)	**George M. Steinbrenner Field**	10,046	47–39	L3
87	July 2	Athletics	6–5	**Pepiot** (6–6)	Spence (2–4)	**Uceta** (1)	**George M. Steinbrenner Field**	10,046	48–39	W1
88	July 4	@ Twins	3–4	Varland (3–3)	**Kelly** (0–1)	—	Target Field	24,197	48–40	L1
89	July 5	@ Twins	5–6	Durán (5–3)	**Cleavinger** (0–4)	—	Target Field	17,679	48–41	L2
90	July 6	@ Twins	7–5 (10)	**Fairbanks** (4–2)	Topa (1–3)	**Orze** (3)	Target Field	21,294	49–41	W1
91	July 7	@ Tigers	1–5	Montero (4–1)	**Baz** (8–4)	—	Comerica Park	22,657	49–42	L1
92	July 8	@ Tigers	2–4	Kahnle (1–1)	**Uceta** (5–2)	Vest (15)	Comerica Park	25,198	49–43	L2
93	July 9	@ Tigers	7–3	**Littell** (8–7)	Lee (4–1)	—	Comerica Park	22,019	50–43	W1
94	July 10	@ Red Sox	3–4	Murphy (1–0)	**Baker** (3–3)	Chapman (16)	Fenway Park	31,884	50–44	L1
95	July 11	@ Red Sox	4–5	Murphy (2–0)	**Fairbanks** (4–3)	—	Fenway Park	34,452	50–45	L2
96	July 12	@ Red Sox	0–1	Crochet (10–4)	**Baz** (8–5)	—	Fenway Park	36,453	50–46	L3
97	July 13	@ Red Sox	1–4	Bello (6–3)	**Pepiot** (6–7)	Chapman (17)	Fenway Park	36,497	50–47	L3
–	July 15	**95th All-Star Game in Cumberland, GA**								
98	July 18	Orioles	11–1	**Bradley** (6–6)	Morton (5–8)	—	**George M. Steinbrenner Field**	10,046	51–47	W1
99	July 19	Orioles	4–3	**Uceta** (6–2)	Domínguez (2–3)	**Fairbanks** (16)	**George M. Steinbrenner Field**	10,046	52–47	W2
100	July 20	Orioles	3–5	Rogers (3–1)	**Pepiot** (6–8)	Bautista (19)	**George M. Steinbrenner Field**	9,195	52–48	L1
101	July 21	White Sox	3–8	Gilbert (4–1)	**Baz** (8–6)	—	**George M. Steinbrenner Field**	10,046	52–49	L2
102	July 22	White Sox	4–3	**Uceta** (7–2)	Martin (2–8)	**Fairbanks** (17)	**George M. Steinbrenner Field**	10,046	53–49	W1
103	July 23	White Sox	9–11	Leasure (3–5)	**Kelly** (0–2)	Altavilla (2)	**George M. Steinbrenner Field**	10,046	53–50	L1
104	July 25	@ Reds	2–7	Martinez (9–9)	**Littell** (8–8)	—	Great American Ball Park	30,110	53–51	L2
105	July 26	@ Reds	2–6	Ashcraft (6–4)	**Baker** (3–4)	—	Great American Ball Park	39,848	53–52	L3
106	July 27	@ Reds	1–2	Singer (8–8)	**Baz** (8–7)	Pagán (22)	Great American Ball Park	20,258	53–53	L4
107	July 28	@ Yankees	4–2	**Rasmussen** (8–5)	Schlittler (1–1)	**Fairbanks** (18)	Yankee Stadium	37,308	54–53	W1
108	July 29	@ Yankees	5–7	Fried (12–4)	**Boyle** (1–1)	Williams (17)	Yankee Stadium	35,660	54–54	L1
109	July 30	@ Yankees	4–5 (11)	Hill (4–3)	**Kelly** (0–3)	—	Yankee Stadium	45,355	54–55	L2
110	July 31	@ Yankees	4–7	Stroman (3–2)	**Pepiot** (6–9)	Loáisiga (1)	Yankee Stadium	44,292	54–56	L3

August: 13–12 (Home: 3–5; Road: 10–8)

#	Date	Opponent	Score	Win	Loss	Save	Venue	Attendance	Record	Streak/ Box
111	August 1	Dodgers	0–5	Kershaw (5–2)	**Baz** (8–8)	Wrobleski (1)	**George M. Steinbrenner Field**	10,046	54–57	L4
112	August 2	Dodgers	4–0	**Rasmussen** (9–5)	Snell (1–1)	—	**George M. Steinbrenner Field**	10,046	55–57	W1
113	August 3	Dodgers	0–3	Yamamoto (10–7)	**Englert** (0–1)	Casparius (2)	**George M. Steinbrenner Field**	10,046	55–58	L1
114	August 4	@ Angels	1–5	Kikuchi (5–7)	**Houser** (6–3)	—	Angel Stadium	25,754	55–59	L2
115	August 5	@ Angels	7–3	**Pepiot** (7–9)	Soriano (7–9)	—	Angel Stadium	27,018	56–59	W1
116	August 6	@ Angels	5–4	**Cleavinger** (1–4)	Zeferjahn (6–4)	**Fairbanks** (19)	Angel Stadium	22,064	57–59	W2
117	August 8	@ Mariners	2–3	Vargas (4–5)	**Jax** (1–6)	Brash (2)	T-Mobile Park	39,780	57–60	L1
118	August 9	@ Mariners	4–7	Evans (6–4)	**Boyle** (1–2)	Muñoz (27)	T-Mobile Park	42,249	57–61	L2
119	August 10	@ Mariners	3–6	Woo (10–6)	**Houser** (6–4)	Brash (3)	T-Mobile Park	37,434	57–62	L3
120	August 11	@ Athletics	7–4	**Pepiot** (8–9)	Springs (10–8)	**Fairbanks** (20)	Sutter Health Park	7,731	58–62	W1
121	August 12	@ Athletics	0–6	Lopez (6–6)	**Baz** (8–9)	—	Sutter Health Park	8,305	58–63	L1
122	August 13	@ Athletics	8–2	**Rasmussen** (10–5)	Ginn (2–5)	—	Sutter Health Park	8,275	59–63	W1
123	August 15	@ Giants	7–6	**Uceta** (8–2)	Rodríguez (3–4)	**Fairbanks** (21)	Oracle Park	34,172	60–63	W2
124	August 16	@ Giants	2–1	**Uceta** (9–2)	Buttó (3–3)	**Fairbanks** (22)	Oracle Park	35,070	61–63	W3
125	August 17	@ Giants	1–7	Webb (11–9)	**Pepiot** (8–10)	—	Oracle Park	38,876	61–64	L1
126	August 19	Yankees	3–13	Rodón (13–7)	**Baz** (8–10)	—	**George M. Steinbrenner Field**	10,046	61–65	L2
127	August 20	Yankees	4–6 (10)	Bednar (4–5)	**Fairbanks** (4–4)	Williams (18)	**George M. Steinbrenner Field**	10,046	61–66	L3
128	August 22	Cardinals	4–7	Gray (12–6)	**Boyle** (1–3)	Romero (4)	**George M. Steinbrenner Field**	9,182	61–67	L4
129	August 23	Cardinals	10–6	**Houser** (7–4)	Mikolas (6–10)	—	**George M. Steinbrenner Field**	10,046	62–67	W1
130	August 24	Cardinals	7–2	**Pepiot** (9–10)	Liberatore (6–11)	—	**George M. Steinbrenner Field**	8,809	63–67	W2
131	August 25	@ Guardians	9–0	**Seymour** (2–0)	Bibee (9–10)	—	Progressive Field	16,325	64–67	W3
132	August 26	@ Guardians	0–3	Messick (1–0)	**Baz** (8–11)	Smith (8)	Progressive Field	19,729	64–68	L1
133	August 27	@ Guardians	3–4 (10)	Smith (6–5)	**Jax** (1–7)	—	Progressive Field	23,316	64–69	L2
134	August 29	@ Nationals	4–1	**Van Belle** (1–0)	Parker (7–15)	**Fairbanks** (23)	Nationals Park	27,358	65–69	W1
135	August 30	@ Nationals	4–1	**Pepiot** (10–10)	Irvin (8–10)	**Baker** (3)	Nationals Park	26,149	66–69	W2
136	August 31	@ Nationals	7–4	**Seymour** (3–0)	Lord (4–8)	**Fairbanks** (24)	Nationals Park	19,436	67–69	W3

September: 10–16 (Home: 7–7; Road: 3–9)

#	Date	Opponent	Score	Win	Loss	Save	Venue	Attendance	Record	Streak/ Box
137	September 1	Mariners	10–2	**Baz** (9–11)	Castillo (8–8)	—	**George M. Steinbrenner Field**	10,046	68–69	W4
138	September 2	Mariners	6–5	**Kelly** (1–3)	Speier (2–2)	**Cleavinger** (2)	**George M. Steinbrenner Field**	7,883	69–69	W5
139	September 3	Mariners	9–4	**Houser** (8–4)	Kirby (8–7)	—	**George M. Steinbrenner Field**	8,589	70–69	W6
140	September 4	Guardians	4–2	**Pepiot** (11–10)	Allen (7–11)	—	**George M. Steinbrenner Field**	8,306	71–69	W7
141	September 5	Guardians	1–7	Williams (10–5)	**Seymour** (3–1)	—	**George M. Steinbrenner Field**	8,836	71–70	L1
142	September 6	Guardians	2–3	Gaddis (2–2)	**Fairbanks** (4–5)	Smith (10)	**George M. Steinbrenner Field**	10,046	71–71	L2
143	September 7	Guardians	1–2	Messick (2–0)	**Cleavinger** (1–5)	Smith (11)	**George M. Steinbrenner Field**	10,046	71–72	L3
144	September 9	@ White Sox	5–4	**Kelly** (2–3)	Alexander (5–14)	**Fairbanks** (25)	Rate Field	12,487	72–72	W1
145	September 10	@ White Sox	5–6	Leasure (5–6)	**Montgomery** (1–3)	Gilbert (1)	Rate Field	12,099	72–73	L1
146	September 11	@ White Sox	1–5	Smith (6–7)	**Seymour** (3–2)	—	Rate Field	11,850	72–74	L2
147	September 12	@ Cubs	4–6	Boyd (13–8)	**Baz** (9–12)	Kittredge (4)	Wrigley Field	38,794	72–75	L3
148	September 13	@ Cubs	5–4	**Baker** (4–4)	Keller (4–2)	**Fairbanks** (26)	Wrigley Field	39,712	73–75	W1
149	September 14	@ Cubs	3–4	Assad (3–1)	**Uceta** (9–3)	Kittredge (5)	Wrigley Field	37,186	73–76	L1
150	September 15	Blue Jays	1–2 (11)	Fisher (7–0)	**Kelly** (4–2)	—	**George M. Steinbrenner Field**	8,972	73–77	L2
151	September 16	Blue Jays	5–6	Lauer (9–2)	**Pepiot** (11–11)	Hoffman (31)	**George M. Steinbrenner Field**	8,908	73–78	L3
152	September 17	Blue Jays	2–1	**Seymour** (4–2)	Rodríguez (2–2)	**Fairbanks** (27)	**George M. Steinbrenner Field**	8,959	74–78	W1
153	September 18	Blue Jays	4–0	**Baz** (10–12)	Bassitt (11–9)	—	**George M. Steinbrenner Field**	8,042	75–78	W2
154	September 19	Red Sox	7–11	Crochet (17–5)	**Cleavinger** (1–6)	—	**George M. Steinbrenner Field**	10,046	75–79	L1
155	September 20	Red Sox	3–6	Whitlock (7–3)	**Scholtens** (0–1)	Chapman (31)	**George M. Steinbrenner Field**	10,046	75–80	L2
156	September 21	Red Sox	7–3	**Cleavinger** (2–6)	Early (1–1)	—	**George M. Steinbrenner Field**	10,046	76–80	W1
157	September 23	@ Orioles	0–6	Kremer (11–10)	**Pepiot** (11–12)	—	Camden Yards	15,267	76–81	L1
158	September 24	@ Orioles	6–2	**Uceta** (10–3)	Wells (2–1)	—	Camden Yards	18,367	77–81	W1
159	September 25	@ Orioles	5–6	Akin (5–4)	**Kelly** (2–5)	—	Camden Yards	16,777	77–82	L1
160	September 26	@ Blue Jays	2–4	Bieber (4–2)	**Houser** (8–5)	Hoffman (33)	Rogers Centre	42,184	77–83	L2
161	September 27	@ Blue Jays	1–5	Yesavage (1–0)	**Boyle** (1–4)	—	Rogers Centre	42,624	77–84	L3
162	September 28	@ Blue Jays	4–13	Fluharty (5–2)	**Seymour** (4–3)	—	Rogers Centre	42,083	77–85	L4

== Roster ==
2025 Tampa Bay Rays
Roster
Pitchers: 54 Garrett Acton; 47 Bryan Baker; 11 Shane Baz; 43 Hunter Bigge; 36 Joe Boyle; 45 Taj Bradley; 60 Garrett Cleavinger; 59 Mason Englert; 29 Peter Fairbanks; 55 Joey Gerber; 54 Paul Gervase; 37 Adrian Houser; 22 Griffin Jax; 49 Kevin Kelly; 52 Zack Littell; 48 Mason Montgomery; 17 Eric Orze; 44 Ryan Pepiot; 57 Drew Rasmussen; 68 Joe Rock; 39 Manuel Rodríguez; 65 Jesse Scholtens; 41 Connor Seabold; 61 Ian Seymour; 71 Cole Sulser; 63 Edwin Uceta; 67 Brian Van Belle; 38 Forrest Whitley; 73 Cole Wilcox	Catchers: 30 Hunter Feduccia; 40 Nick Fortes; 19 Danny Jansen; 30 Ben Rortvedt; 34 Matt Thaiss; Infielders: 62 Jonathan Aranda; 77 José Caballero; 13 Junior Caminero; 2 Yandy Díaz; 10 Tristan Gray; 7 Ha-seong Kim; 8 Brandon Lowe; 25 Curtis Mead; 10 Coco Montes; 1 Richie Palacios; 41 Bob Seymour; 6 Taylor Walls; 7,77 Carson Williams	Outfielders: 21 Jonny DeLuca; 20 Travis Jankowski; 15 Josh Lowe; 28 Jake Mangum; 26 Kameron Misner; 24 Christopher Morel; 45 Everson Pereira; 25 Tristan Peters; 14 Chandler Simpson	Manager: 16 Kevin Cash; Coaches: 99 Misha Dworken (bullpen catcher); 46 Tomas Francisco (field coordinator); -- Kris Goodman (process and development); 9 Michael Johns (first base); 52 Rick Knapp (assistant pitching); 27 Rodney Linares (bench); 33 Jorge Moncada (bullpen); 51 Chad Mottola (hitting); 35 Brady North (assistant hitting); 23 Kyle Snyder (pitching); 96 Charlie Valerio (bullpen catcher); 4 Brady Williams (third base)

== Player stats ==
= Indicates team leader

=== Batting ===
Note: G = Games played; AB = At bats; R = Runs scored; H = Hits; 2B = Doubles; 3B = Triples; HR = Home runs; RBI = Runs batted in; SB = Stolen bases; BB = Walks; AVG = Batting average; SLG = Slugging average

Player	G	AB	R	H	2B	3B	HR	RBI	SB	BB	AVG	SLG
Junior Caminero	154	602	93	159	28	0	45	110	7	41	.264	.535
Yandy Diaz	150	583	79	175	29	1	25	83	3	57	.300	.482
Brandon Lowe	134	507	79	130	19	0	31	83	3	38	.256	.477
Chandler Simpson	109	414	53	122	15	3	0	26	44	20	.295	.345
Jake Mangum	118	405	37	120	18	1	3	40	27	19	.296	.368
Josh Lowe	108	396	56	87	21	2	11	40	18	33	.220	.366
Jonathan Aranda	106	370	56	117	22	0	14	59	0	41	.316	.489
Taylor Walls	101	282	36	62	14	1	4	38	14	26	.220	.319
Christopher Morel	105	278	37	61	16	0	11	33	7	25	.219	.396
José Caballero	86	235	37	53	12	1	2	27	34	33	.226	.311
Danny Jansen	73	221	28	45	8	0	11	29	0	33	.204	.389
Kameron Misner	71	197	27	42	9	1	5	22	8	16	.213	.345
Curtis Mead	49	115	14	26	2	1	3	8	4	12	.226	.339
Carson Williams	32	99	11	17	3	0	5	12	2	6	.172	.354
Nick Fortes	38	89	8	19	3	0	3	11	1	7	.213	.348
Hunter Feduccia	36	86	5	13	5	0	0	8	1	14	.151	.209
Ha-Seong Kim	24	84	5	18	3	0	2	5	6	8	.214	.321
Bob Seymour	26	78	9	16	1	1	1	5	1	4	.205	.282
Tristan Gray	30	78	9	18	5	0	3	9	0	6	.231	.410
Matt Thaiss	25	71	5	16	2	1	0	8	0	6	.225	.282
Everson Pereira	23	65	7	9	1	0	2	8	2	7	.138	.246
Ben Rortvedt	26	63	2	6	1	0	0	6	0	7	.095	.111
Jonny DeLuca	20	57	5	19	1	3	0	4	6	2	.333	.456
Richie Palacios	17	42	10	14	2	0	1	3	4	5	.333	.452
Travis Jankowski	14	31	6	8	2	0	0	2	2	2	.258	.323
Tristan Peters	4	12	0	0	0	0	0	0	0	0	.000	.000
Coco Montes	5	10	0	2	0	0	0	1	0	0	.200	.200
Totals	162	5470	714	1374	242	16	182	680	194	468	.251	.401

Source:Baseball Reference

=== Pitching ===
Note: W = Wins; L = Losses; ERA = Earned run average; G = Games pitched; GS = Games started; SV = Saves; IP = Innings pitched; H = Hits allowed; R = Runs allowed; ER = Earned runs allowed; BB = Walks allowed; SO = Strikeouts

Player	W	L	ERA	G	GS	SV	IP	H	R	ER	BB	SO
Ryan Pepiot	11	12	3.86	31	31	0	167.2	134	77	72	61	167
Shane Baz	10	12	4.87	31	31	0	166.1	158	91	90	64	176
Drew Rasmussen	10	5	2.76	31	31	0	150.0	116	47	46	37	127
Zack Littell	8	8	3.58	22	22	0	133.1	128	53	53	21	89
Taj Bradley	6	6	4.61	21	21	0	111.1	99	65	57	44	95
Edwin Uceta	10	3	3.79	70	0	1	76.0	62	33	32	27	103
Garrett Cleavinger	2	6	2.35	67	0	2	61.1	40	17	16	18	82
Pete Fairbanks	4	5	2.83	61	0	27	60.1	45	22	19	18	59
Ian Seymour	4	3	3.63	19	5	0	57.0	48	33	23	19	64
Adrian Houser	2	3	4.79	10	10	0	56.1	60	30	30	16	45
Joe Boyle	1	4	4.67	13	9	0	52.0	43	33	27	28	58
Mason Montgomery	1	3	5.67	57	0	1	46.0	49	32	29	27	63
Mason Englert	0	1	3.83	29	0	0	44.2	43	20	19	11	44
Eric Orze	1	1	3.02	33	0	3	41.2	38	16	14	19	40
Kevin Kelly	2	5	5.90	41	0	0	39.2	45	29	26	9	35
Bryan Baker	1	2	4.75	31	0	1	30.1	26	16	16	8	34
Manuel Rodríguez	1	2	2.08	31	0	0	30.1	26	9	7	6	25
Cole Sulser	2	1	1.99	18	0	0	22.2	20	5	5	7	22
Griffin Jax	0	2	3.60	23	2	0	20.0	18	9	8	8	27
Hunter Bigge	0	0	2.40	13	0	0	15.0	11	4	4	5	12
Brian Van Belle	1	0	5.40	4	0	0	8.1	13	5	5	0	6
Jesse Scholtens	0	1	5.40	2	0	0	8.1	9	7	5	3	12
Joe Rock	0	0	2.35	3	0	0	7.2	7	2	2	2	11
Connor Seabold	0	0	1.35	3	0	0	6.2	7	1	1	3	5
Paul Gervase	0	0	4.26	5	0	0	6.1	6	3	3	5	6
Forrest Whitley	0	0	15.43	5	0	0	4.2	10	10	8	2	4
Joey Gerber	0	0	2.08	2	0	0	4.1	3	1	1	0	4
José Caballero	0	0	54.00	1	0	0	1.0	5	6	6	1	0
Garrett Acton	0	0	0.00	1	0	0	1.0	0	0	0	2	0
Cole Wilcox	0	0	27.00	1	0	0	1.0	4	7	3	3	1
Totals	77	85	3.94	162	162	35	1431.1	1273	683	627	474	1416

Source:Baseball Reference

== Farm system ==
Minor-league coaching assignments were announced on January 21.

Level	Team	League	Manager
AAA	Durham Bulls	International League	Morgan Ensberg
AA	Montgomery Biscuits	Southern League	Kevin Boles
High-A	Bowling Green Hot Rods	South Atlantic League	Rafael Valenzuela
A	Charleston RiverDogs	Carolina League	Sean Smedley
Rookie	FCL Rays	Florida Complex League	Héctor Giménez
Foreign Rookie	DSL Rays 1	Dominican Summer League	
Foreign Rookie	DSL Rays 2	Dominican Summer League	
