= List of Tampa Bay Rays seasons =

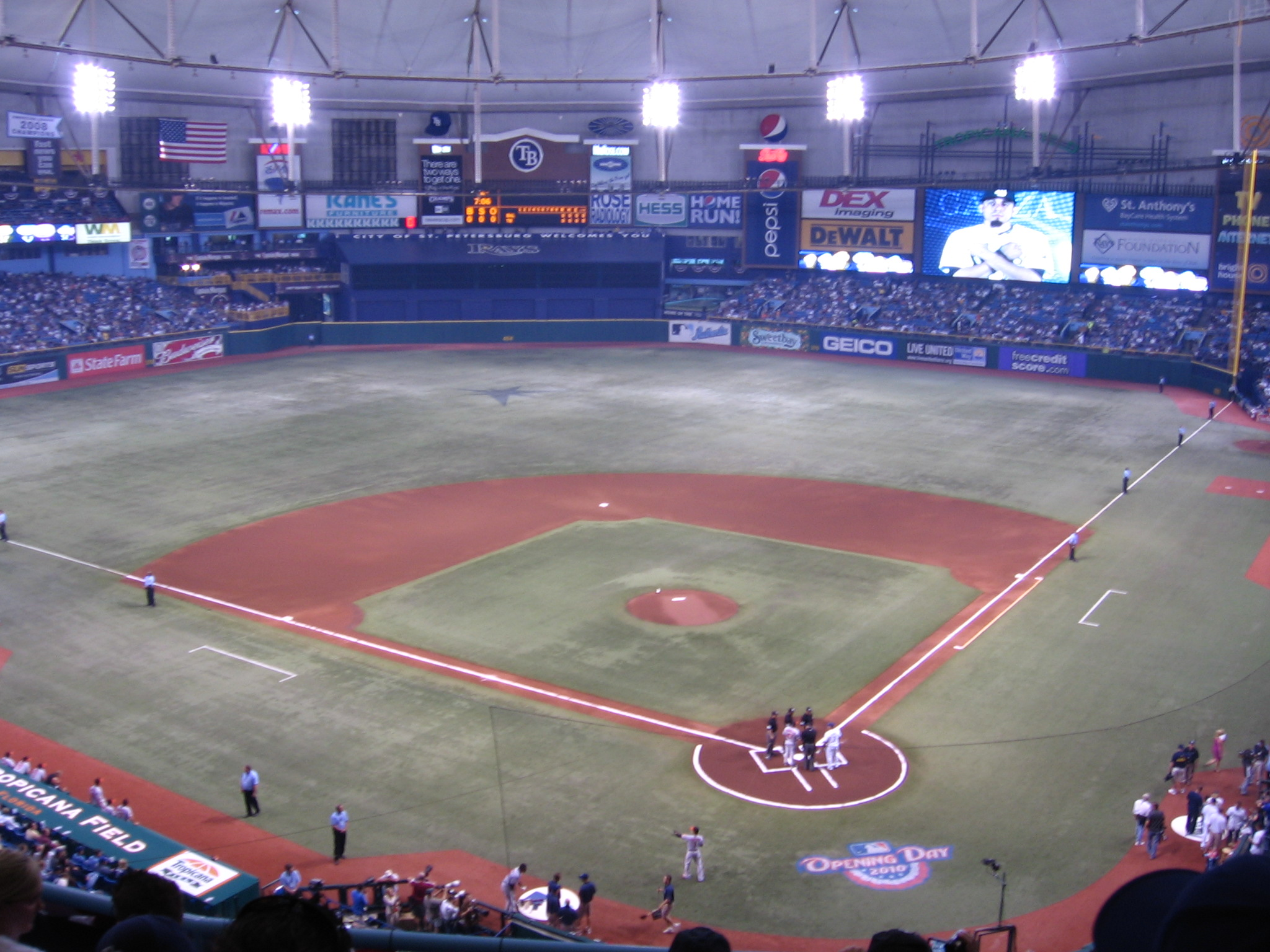
The Rays have played in Tropicana Field since their inaugural season in 1998.

The Tampa Bay Rays are a professional baseball team based in St. Petersburg, Florida. The Rays are a member of the Eastern Division of Major League Baseball's (MLB) American League (AL). Since their inaugural season in 1998, the Rays have played their home games at Tropicana Field. The team was originally known as the "Tampa Bay Devil Rays", which was inspired by a common nickname of the manta ray, but after the 2007 season, they shortened their official name to the "Tampa Bay Rays."

Tampa Bay made their Major League debut in 1998, where they were an expansion team. For their first ten seasons, Tampa Bay struggled, never had a winning record, and always finished fifth in the American League Eastern Division, except for a fourth-place finish in the 2004 season. Since 2008 however, the Rays have advanced to the postseason nine times and have played in the World Series three times: 2008, 2020, and 2026. In 2021, the Rays achieved a 100-win regular season for the first time.

== Table Key ==
ALDS	American League Division Series
ALCS	American League Championship Series
MVP	Most Valuable Player Award
CYA	Cy Young Award
ROY	Rookie of the Year Award
RPOY	Reliever of the Year Award
MOY	Manager of the Year Award
CB POY	Comeback Player of the Year Award
WS MVP	World Series Most Valuable Player Award

== Regular season results ==
World Series champions †	AL champions *	Division champions ^	Wild card berth ¤

Season	Level	League	Division	Finish	Wins	Losses	Win%	GB	Postseason	Awards	Manager
Tampa Bay Devil Rays
1998	MLB	AL	East	5th	63	99	.389	51			Larry Rothschild
1999	MLB	AL	East	5th	69	93	.426	29			Larry Rothschild
2000	MLB	AL	East	5th	69	92	.429	18			Larry Rothschild
2001	MLB	AL	East	5th	62	100	.383	34			Larry Rothschild (4–10); Hal McRae (58–90)
2002	MLB	AL	East	5th	55	106	.342	48			Hal McRae
2003	MLB	AL	East	5th	63	99	.389	38			Lou Piniella
2004	MLB	AL	East	4th	70	91	.435	30½			Lou Piniella
2005	MLB	AL	East	5th	67	95	.414	28			Lou Piniella
2006	MLB	AL	East	5th	61	101	.377	36			Joe Maddon
2007	MLB	AL	East	5th	66	96	.407	30		Carlos Peña (CB POY)	Joe Maddon
Tampa Bay Rays
2008	MLB	AL *	East ^	1st	97	65	.599	–	Won ALDS (White Sox) 3–1; Won ALCS (Red Sox) 4–3; Lost World Series (Phillies) 4–1 *	Evan Longoria (ROY); Joe Maddon (MOY)	Joe Maddon
2009	MLB	AL	East	3rd	84	78	.519	19			Joe Maddon
2010	MLB	AL	East ^	1st	96	66	.593	–	Lost ALDS (Rangers) 3–2		Joe Maddon
2011	MLB	AL	East	2nd ¤	91	71	.562	6	Lost ALDS (Rangers) 3–1	Jeremy Hellickson (ROY); Joe Maddon (MOY)	Joe Maddon
2012	MLB	AL	East	3rd	90	72	.556	5		David Price (CYA); Fernando Rodney (CB POY)	Joe Maddon
2013	MLB	AL	East	2nd ¤	92	71	.564	5½	Won ALWC (Indians); Lost ALDS (Red Sox) 3–1	Wil Myers (ROY)	Joe Maddon
2014	MLB	AL	East	4th	77	85	.475	19			Joe Maddon
2015	MLB	AL	East	4th	80	82	.494	13			Kevin Cash
2016	MLB	AL	East	5th	68	94	.420	25			Kevin Cash
2017	MLB	AL	East	3rd	80	82	.494	13			Kevin Cash
2018	MLB	AL	East	3rd	90	72	.556	18		Blake Snell (CYA)	Kevin Cash
2019	MLB	AL	East	2nd ¤	96	66	.593	7	Won ALWC (Athletics); Lost ALDS (Astros) 3–2		Kevin Cash
2020	MLB	AL *	East ^	1st	40	20	.667	–	Won ALWC (Blue Jays) 2–0; Won ALDS (Yankees) 3–2; Won ALCS (Astros) 4–3; Lost World Series (Dodgers) 4–2 *	Kevin Cash (MOY)	Kevin Cash
2021	MLB	AL	East ^	1st	100	62	.617	–	Lost ALDS (Red Sox) 3–1	Randy Arozarena (ROY); Kevin Cash (MOY)	Kevin Cash
2022	MLB	AL	East	3rd ¤	86	76	.531	13	Lost ALWC (Guardians) 2–0		Kevin Cash
2023	MLB	AL	East	2nd ¤	99	63	.611	2	Lost ALWC (Rangers) 2–0		Kevin Cash
2024	MLB	AL	East	4th	80	82	.494	14			Kevin Cash
2025	MLB	AL	East	4th	77	85	.475	17			Kevin Cash
2026	MLB	AL *	East ^	1st	98	64	.605	–	Won ALDS (Yankees) 3–0; Won ALCS (Guardians) 4–2; Lost World Series (Brewers) 4–1 *	Bryan Baker (RPOY)	Kevin Cash
Totals					Wins	Losses	Win%				
Totals					2,266	2,328	.493	All-time regular season record (1998–2026)			
Totals					36	42	.462	All-time postseason record			
Totals					2,302	2,370	.493	All-time regular and postseason record			

== Record by decade ==
The following table describes the Rays' MLB win–loss record by decade.

Decade	Wins	Losses	Pct
1990s	132	192	.407
2000s	694	923	.429
2010s	860	761	.531
2020s	580	452	.562
All-time	2,266	2,328	.493

These statistics are from Baseball-Reference.com's Tampa Bay Rays History & Encyclopedia, and are current through the 2025 regular season.

== Postseason appearances ==
Year	Wild Card Game/Series		LDS		LCS		World Series	
2008	None (Won AL East)		Chicago White Sox	W (3–1)	Boston Red Sox	W (4–3)	Philadelphia Phillies	L (1–4)
2010	None (Won AL East)		Texas Rangers	L (2–3)				
2011	None (Won AL Wild Card)		Texas Rangers	L (1–3)				
2013	Cleveland Indians W		Boston Red Sox	L (1–3)				
2019	Oakland Athletics W		Houston Astros	L (2–3)				
2020	Toronto Blue Jays	W (2–0)	New York Yankees	W (3–2)	Houston Astros	W (4–3)	Los Angeles Dodgers	L (2–4)
2021	None (Won AL East)		Boston Red Sox	L (1–3)				
2022	Cleveland Guardians	L (0–2)						
2023	Texas Rangers	L (0–2)						
2026	None (Won AL East)		New York Yankees	W (3–0)	Cleveland Guardians	W (4–2)	Milwaukee Brewers	L (1–4)

== Post-season record by year ==
The Rays have made the postseason ten times in their history, with their first being in 2008 and the most recent being in 2026.

Year	Finish	Round	Opponent	Result		
2008	American League Champions	ALDS	Chicago White Sox	Won	3	1
2008	American League Champions	ALCS	Boston Red Sox	Won	4	3
2008	American League Champions	World Series	Philadelphia Phillies	Lost	1	4
2010	AL East Champions	ALDS	Texas Rangers	Lost	2	3
2011	AL Wild Card	ALDS	Texas Rangers	Lost	1	3
2013	AL Wild Card Champions	ALWC	Cleveland Indians	Won	1	0
2013	AL Wild Card Champions	ALDS	Boston Red Sox	Lost	1	3
2019	AL Wild Card Champions	ALWC	Oakland Athletics	Won	1	0
2019	AL Wild Card Champions	ALDS	Houston Astros	Lost	2	3
2020	American League Champions	ALWC	Toronto Blue Jays	Won	2	0
2020	American League Champions	ALDS	New York Yankees	Won	3	2
2020	American League Champions	ALCS	Houston Astros	Won	4	3
2020	American League Champions	World Series	Los Angeles Dodgers	Lost	2	4
2021	AL East Champions	ALDS	Boston Red Sox	Lost	1	3
2022	AL Wild Card	ALWC	Cleveland Guardians	Lost	0	2
2023	AL Wild Card	ALWC	Texas Rangers	Lost	0	2
2026	American League Champions	ALDS	New York Yankees	Won	3	0
2026	American League Champions	ALCS	Cleveland Guardians	Won	4	2
2026	American League Champions	World Series	Milwaukee Brewers	Lost	1	4
10	Totals			9–10	36	42

== See also ==
- Tampa Bay Rays team records
- List of Tampa Bay Rays Opening Day starting pitchers
