= List of Tampa Bay Rays minor league affiliates =

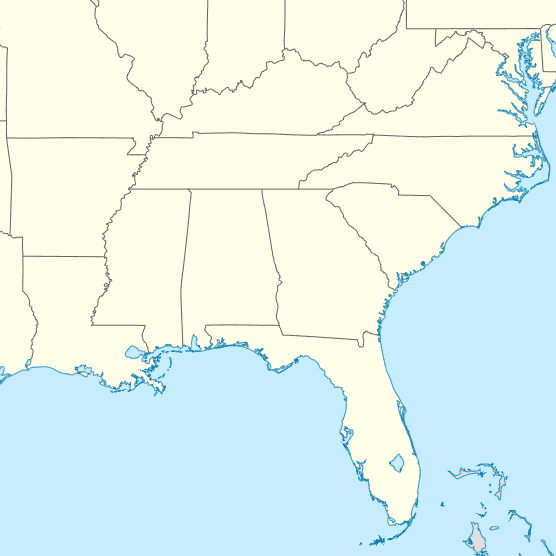
Current Tampa Bay Rays domestic minor league affiliate locations

The Tampa Bay Rays farm system consists of seven Minor League Baseball affiliates across the United States and in the Dominican Republic. Four teams are independently owned, while three—the Florida Complex League Rays and two Dominican Summer League Rays squads—are owned by the major league club.

The Rays have been affiliated with the Triple-A Durham Bulls of the International League since 1998, making it the longest-running affiliation in the organization among teams not owned by the Rays. Their newest affiliate is the Charleston RiverDogs of the Carolina League, which became the Rays' Single-A club in 2021.

Geographically, Tampa Bay's closest domestic affiliate is the Rookie Florida Complex League Rays, which are approximately 61 miles (98 km) away. Tampa Bay's furthest domestic affiliate is the High-A Bowling Green Hot Rods of the South Atlantic League some 674 miles (1,085 km) away.

== Current affiliates ==
The Tampa Bay Rays farm system consists of seven minor league affiliates.

Class	Team	League	Location	Ballpark	Affiliated
Triple-A	Durham Bulls	International League	Durham, North Carolina	Durham Bulls Athletic Park	1998
Double-A	Montgomery Biscuits	Southern League	Montgomery, Alabama	Dabos Park	1999
High-A	Bowling Green Hot Rods	South Atlantic League	Bowling Green, Kentucky	Bowling Green Ballpark	2009
Single-A	Charleston RiverDogs	Carolina League	Charleston, South Carolina	Joseph P. Riley Jr. Park	2021
Rookie	FCL Rays	Florida Complex League	Port Charlotte, Florida	Charlotte Sports Park	2009
Rookie	DSL Rays	Dominican Summer League	Boca Chica, Santo Domingo	Tampa Bay Rays Complex	2016
Rookie	DSL Tampa Bay	Dominican Summer League	Boca Chica, Santo Domingo	Tampa Bay Rays Complex	2016

== Past affiliates ==
=== Key ===
Season	Each year is linked to an article about that particular Tampa Bay season.

=== 1996–2020 ===
Minor League Baseball operated with six classes (Triple-A, Double-A, Class A-Advanced, Class A, Class A Short Season, and Rookie) from 1996 to 2020. The Rookie level consisted of domestic and foreign circuits.

Season	Triple-A	Double-A	Class A-Advanced	Class A	Class A Short Season	Rookie	Foreign Rookie	Ref.
1996	—	—	—	—	Butte Copper Kings; Hudson Valley Renegades	GCL Devil Rays	—	
1997	—	—	St. Petersburg Devil Rays	Charleston RiverDogs	Hudson Valley Renegades	Princeton Devil Rays; GCL Devil Rays	—	
1998	Durham Bulls	—	St. Petersburg Devil Rays	Charleston RiverDogs	Hudson Valley Renegades	Princeton Devil Rays; GCL Devil Rays	DSL Devil Rays	
1999	Durham Bulls	Orlando Rays	St. Petersburg Devil Rays	Charleston RiverDogs	Hudson Valley Renegades	Princeton Devil Rays	DSL Devil Rays	
2000	Durham Bulls	Orlando Rays	St. Petersburg Devil Rays	Charleston RiverDogs	Hudson Valley Renegades	Princeton Devil Rays	DSL Devil Rays	
2001	Durham Bulls	Orlando Rays	Bakersfield Blaze	Charleston RiverDogs	Hudson Valley Renegades	Princeton Devil Rays	DSL Devil Rays	
2002	Durham Bulls	Orlando Rays	Bakersfield Blaze	Charleston RiverDogs	Hudson Valley Renegades	Princeton Devil Rays	—	
2003	Durham Bulls	Orlando Rays	Bakersfield Blaze	Charleston RiverDogs	Hudson Valley Renegades	Princeton Devil Rays	—	
2004	Durham Bulls	Montgomery Biscuits	Bakersfield Blaze	Charleston RiverDogs	Hudson Valley Renegades	Princeton Devil Rays	—	
2005	Durham Bulls	Montgomery Biscuits	Visalia Oaks	Southwest Michigan Devil Rays	Hudson Valley Renegades	Princeton Devil Rays	—	
2006	Durham Bulls	Montgomery Biscuits	Visalia Oaks	Southwest Michigan Devil Rays	Hudson Valley Renegades	Princeton Devil Rays	—	
2007	Durham Bulls	Montgomery Biscuits	Vero Beach Devil Rays	Columbus Catfish	Hudson Valley Renegades	Princeton Devil Rays	DSL Devil Rays; VSL Devil Rays/Reds	
2008	Durham Bulls	Montgomery Biscuits	Vero Beach Devil Rays	Columbus Catfish	Hudson Valley Renegades	Princeton Rays	DSL Rays; VSL Rays	
2009	Durham Bulls	Montgomery Biscuits	Charlotte Stone Crabs	Bowling Green Hot Rods	Hudson Valley Renegades	Princeton Rays; GCL Rays	DSL Rays; VSL Rays	
2010	Durham Bulls	Montgomery Biscuits	Charlotte Stone Crabs	Bowling Green Hot Rods	Hudson Valley Renegades	Princeton Rays; GCL Rays	DSL Rays; VSL Rays	
2011	Durham Bulls	Montgomery Biscuits	Charlotte Stone Crabs	Bowling Green Hot Rods	Hudson Valley Renegades	Princeton Rays; GCL Rays	DSL Rays; VSL Rays	
2012	Durham Bulls	Montgomery Biscuits	Charlotte Stone Crabs	Bowling Green Hot Rods	Hudson Valley Renegades	Princeton Rays; GCL Rays	DSL Rays; VSL Rays	
2013	Durham Bulls	Montgomery Biscuits	Charlotte Stone Crabs	Bowling Green Hot Rods	Hudson Valley Renegades	Princeton Rays; GCL Rays	DSL Rays; VSL Rays	
2014	Durham Bulls	Montgomery Biscuits	Charlotte Stone Crabs	Bowling Green Hot Rods	Hudson Valley Renegades	Princeton Rays; GCL Rays	DSL Rays; VSL Rays	
2015	Durham Bulls	Montgomery Biscuits	Charlotte Stone Crabs	Bowling Green Hot Rods	Hudson Valley Renegades	Princeton Rays; GCL Rays	DSL Rays; VSL Rays	
2016	Durham Bulls	Montgomery Biscuits	Charlotte Stone Crabs	Bowling Green Hot Rods	Hudson Valley Renegades	Princeton Rays; GCL Rays	DSL Rays 1 DSL Rays 2	
2017	Durham Bulls	Montgomery Biscuits	Charlotte Stone Crabs	Bowling Green Hot Rods	Hudson Valley Renegades	Princeton Rays; GCL Rays	DSL Rays 1 DSL Rays 2	
2018	Durham Bulls	Montgomery Biscuits	Charlotte Stone Crabs	Bowling Green Hot Rods	Hudson Valley Renegades	Princeton Rays; GCL Rays	DSL Rays 1 DSL Rays 2	
2019	Durham Bulls	Montgomery Biscuits	Charlotte Stone Crabs	Bowling Green Hot Rods	Hudson Valley Renegades	Princeton Rays; GCL Rays	DSL Rays 1 DSL Rays 2	
2020 (Note: The 2020 Minor League Baseball season was cancelled due to the COVID-19 pandemic.)	Durham Bulls	Montgomery Biscuits	Charlotte Stone Crabs	Bowling Green Hot Rods	Hudson Valley Renegades	Princeton Rays; GCL Rays	DSL Rays 1 DSL Rays 2	

=== 2021–present ===
The current structure of Minor League Baseball is the result of an overall contraction of the system beginning with the 2021 season. Class A was reduced to two levels: High-A and Low-A. Low-A was reclassified as Single-A in 2022.

Season	Triple-A	Double-A	High-A	Single-A	Rookie	Foreign Rookie	Ref.
2021	Durham Bulls	Montgomery Biscuits	Bowling Green Hot Rods	Charleston RiverDogs	FCL Rays	DSL Rays 1 DSL Rays 2	
2022	Durham Bulls	Montgomery Biscuits	Bowling Green Hot Rods	Charleston RiverDogs	FCL Rays	DSL Rays; DSL Tampa Bay	
2023	Durham Bulls	Montgomery Biscuits	Bowling Green Hot Rods	Charleston RiverDogs	FCL Rays	DSL Rays; DSL Tampa Bay	
2024	Durham Bulls	Montgomery Biscuits	Bowling Green Hot Rods	Charleston RiverDogs	FCL Rays	DSL Rays; DSL Tampa Bay	
2025	Durham Bulls	Montgomery Biscuits	Bowling Green Hot Rods	Charleston RiverDogs	FCL Rays	DSL Rays; DSL Tampa Bay	
2026	Durham Bulls	Montgomery Biscuits	Bowling Green Hot Rods	Charleston RiverDogs	FCL Rays	DSL Rays; DSL Tampa Bay	
