= List of Tampa Bay Rays Opening Day starting pitchers =

The Tampa Bay Rays are a Major League Baseball (MLB) franchise based in St. Petersburg, Florida. They play in the American League East division. The first game of the new baseball season for a team is played on Opening Day, and being named the Opening Day starter is an honor, which is often given to the player who is expected to lead the pitching staff that season, though there are various strategic reasons why a team's best pitcher might not start on Opening Day. The Rays have used fifteen different Opening Day starting pitchers in their twenty-six seasons. Since the franchise's beginning in 1998, the fifteen starters have a combined Opening Day record of seven wins, ten losses (7–10), and nine no decisions. "No decisions" are awarded to the starting pitcher if the game is won or lost after the starting pitcher has left the game.

Chris Archer and James Shields holds the Rays' record for most Opening Day starts with four. Archer has one win, two losses, and one no decision, while Shields has one win, one loss, and two no decisions. The all-time record for a Tampa Bay starting pitcher winning an Opening Day game is one, shared by Steve Trachsel, Albie Lopez, Victor Zambrano, James Shields, David Price, Chris Archer, and Shane McClanahan.

Overall, Rays starting pitchers have a combined 5–7 record at home and 2–3 when they are away for Opening Day. In 2004, the Rays opened the season against the New York Yankees at Tokyo Dome in Tokyo, Japan. Although that game was not played in Tampa Bay's actual home of Tropicana Field, it was still considered a home game for the Rays. Tampa Bay beat the Yankees 8–3 in that game, giving starting pitcher Victor Zambrano the win.

== Key ==
Season	Each year is linked to an article about that particular Rays season.
W	Win
L	Loss
ND (W)	No decision by starting pitcher; Rays won game
ND (L)	No decision by starting pitcher; Rays lost game
Pitcher (#)	Number of appearances as Opening Day starter with the Rays
*	Advanced to the post-season
**	Won the American League Championship Series

== Pitchers ==
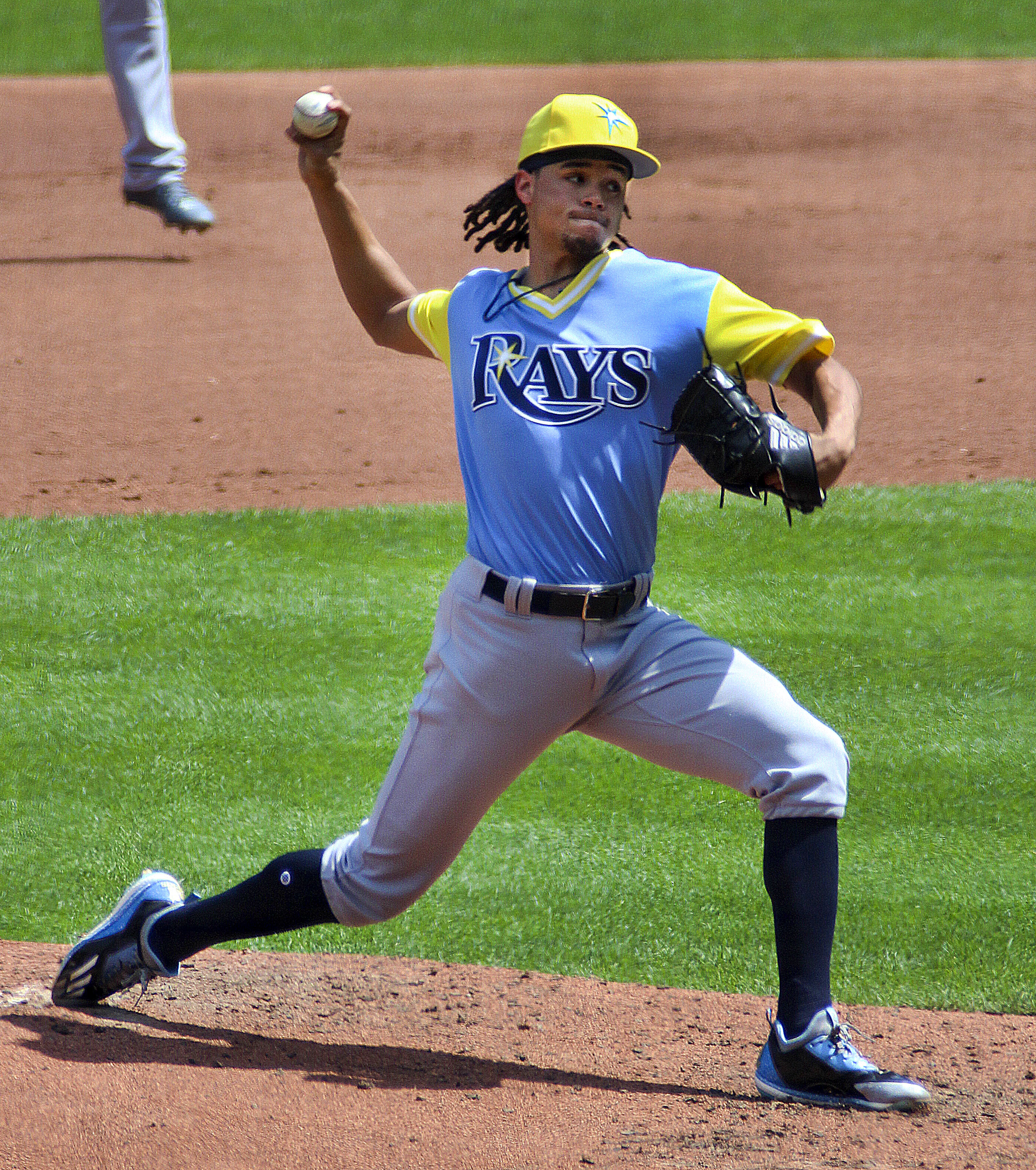
Chris Archer had four consecutive Opening Day starts with the Rays from 2015 to 2018.

Season	Pitcher	Decision	Opponent	Location	Ref(s)
1998	Wilson Alvarez	L	Detroit Tigers	Tropicana Field	
1999	Wilson Alvarez (2)	L	Baltimore Orioles	Oriole Park at Camden Yards	
2000	Steve Trachsel	W	Minnesota Twins	Hubert H. Humphrey Metrodome	
2001	Albie Lopez	W	Toronto Blue Jays	Tropicana Field	
2002	Tanyon Sturtze	ND (W)	Detroit Tigers	Tropicana Field	
2003	Joe Kennedy	ND (W)	Boston Red Sox	Tropicana Field	
2004	Victor Zambrano	W	New York Yankees	Tokyo Dome	
2005	Dewon Brazelton	L	Toronto Blue Jays	Tropicana Field	
2006	Scott Kazmir	ND (L)	Baltimore Orioles	Oriole Park at Camden Yards	
2007	Scott Kazmir (2)	L	New York Yankees	Yankee Stadium	
2008**	James Shields	W	Baltimore Orioles	Oriole Park at Camden Yards	
2009	James Shields (2)	L	Boston Red Sox	Fenway Park	
2010*	James Shields (3)	ND (W)	Baltimore Orioles	Tropicana Field	
2011*	David Price	L	Baltimore Orioles	Tropicana Field	
2012	James Shields (4)	ND (W)	New York Yankees	Tropicana Field	
2013*	David Price (2)	ND (L)	Baltimore Orioles	Tropicana Field	
2014	David Price (3)	W	Toronto Blue Jays	Tropicana Field	
2015	Chris Archer	L	Baltimore Orioles	Tropicana Field	
2016	Chris Archer (2)	L	Toronto Blue Jays	Tropicana Field	
2017	Chris Archer (3)	W	New York Yankees	Tropicana Field	
2018	Chris Archer (4)	ND (W)	Boston Red Sox	Tropicana Field	
2019*	Blake Snell	L	Houston Astros	Tropicana Field	
2020**	Charlie Morton	L	Toronto Blue Jays	Tropicana Field	
2021*	Tyler Glasnow	ND (W)	Miami Marlins	loanDepot Park	
2022*	Shane McClanahan	ND (W)	Baltimore Orioles	Tropicana Field	
2023*	Shane McClanahan (2)	W	Detroit Tigers	Tropicana Field	
2024	Zach Eflin	L	Toronto Blue Jays	Tropicana Field	
2025	Ryan Pepiot	ND (W)	Colorado Rockies	George M. Steinbrenner Field	
2026**	Drew Rasmussen	ND (L)	St. Louis Cardinals	Busch Stadium	
