= Owen Miller =

American baseball player (born 1996)

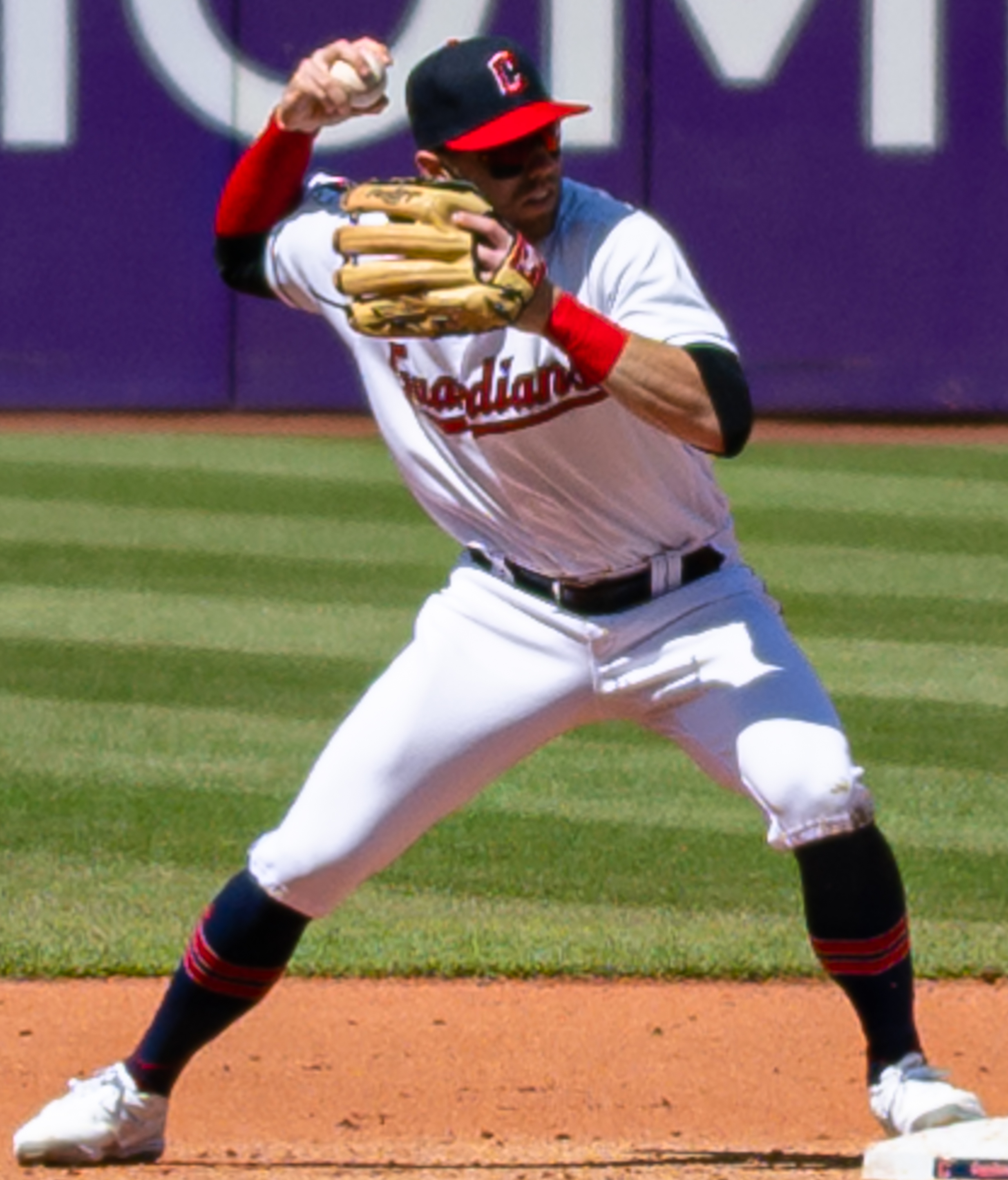
- Miller with the Cleveland Guardians in 2022

Free agent
- Infielder / Outfielder
- Born: November 15, 1996 (age 29); Mequon, Wisconsin, U.S.
- Bats: Right Throws: Right

MLB debut
- May 23, 2021, for the Cleveland Indians

MLB statistics (through 2026 season)
- Batting average: .238
- Home runs: 15
- Runs batted in: 100
- Stats at Baseball Reference

Teams
- Cleveland Indians / Guardians (2021–2022); Milwaukee Brewers (2023–2024); Colorado Rockies (2025); Chicago Cubs (2026)

Owen Robert Miller (born November 15, 1996) is an American professional baseball infielder and outfielder who is a free agent. He has previously played in Major League Baseball (MLB) for the Cleveland Indians / Guardians, Milwaukee Brewers, Colorado Rockies, and Chicago Cubs. Miller was selected by the San Diego Padres in the third round of the 2018 MLB draft. He made his MLB debut in 2021 with the Indians.

== Amateur career ==
Miller attended Ozaukee High School in Fredonia, Wisconsin. He played football and basketball for Ozaukee all four years. He did not play high school baseball after his freshman year, focusing strictly on travel baseball. He went undrafted in the 2015 MLB draft, and enrolled at Illinois State University where he played college baseball for the Redbirds.

In 2016, Miller's freshman season, he started all 54 of ISU's games, hitting .328 with five home runs and 44 RBIs. As a sophomore in 2017, he slashed .325/.351/.498 with six home runs and 48 RBIs in 56 games, earning a spot on the All-Missouri Valley Conference Second-Team. After the season, he played collegiate summer baseball with the Harwich Mariners of the Cape Cod Baseball League, and also played in the Northwoods League. In 2018, as a junior, he batted .384 with six home runs and 35 RBIs in 52 games and earned All-MVC First-Team honors.

== Professional career ==
=== San Diego Padres ===
The San Diego Padres selected Miller in the third round (84th overall) of the 2018 MLB draft. He signed with the Padres for $500,000, and made his professional debut with the Tri-City Dust Devils of the Low-A Northwest League, where he was named an All-Star. Miller was promoted to the Fort Wayne TinCaps of the Single-A Midwest League in August. In 75 games between the two clubs, he slashed .336/.386/.460 with four home runs and 33 RBI. Miller spent the 2019 season with the Amarillo Sod Poodles of the Double-A Texas League and was named an All-Star. Over 130 games, Miller slashed .290/.355/.430 with 13 home runs and 68 RBI. Following the 2019 season, Miller played for the Peoria Javelinas of the Arizona Fall League.

=== Cleveland Indians / Guardians ===
On August 31, 2020, Miller, along with Austin Hedges, Cal Quantrill, Josh Naylor, Gabriel Arias, and Joey Cantillo were traded to the Cleveland Indians in exchange for Mike Clevinger, Greg Allen, and Matt Waldron. He did not play a minor league game in 2020 due to the cancellation of the minor league season caused by the COVID-19 pandemic. To begin the 2021 season, he was assigned to the Columbus Clippers of the Triple-A East.

On May 23, 2021, Miller was selected to the Indians' 40-man roster and promoted to the major leagues for the first time. At the time of his promotion, he was batting .406 with two home runs and nine runs batted in over 16 games with Columbus. He made his major league debut the same day as the designated hitter against the Minnesota Twins, going hitless in five at-bats with three strikeouts. He recorded his first major league hit, an infield single, on May 24 versus Spencer Turnbull of the Detroit Tigers. On July 31, Miller hit his first career home run off of Dallas Keuchel of the Chicago White Sox. For the 2021 season, Miller appeared in sixty games for the Indians, batting .204 with four home runs and 18 RBIs.

In 2022 he batted .243/.301/.351, and had the fastest sprint speed of all major league first basemen, at 29.0 feet per second.

=== Milwaukee Brewers ===
On December 14, 2022, Miller was traded to the Milwaukee Brewers in exchange for a player to be named later and an unspecified amount of cash. He played in 90 games for Milwaukee in 2023, hitting .261/.303/.371 with 5 home runs, 27 RBI, and 13 stolen bases.

Miller was optioned to the Triple–A Nashville Sounds to begin the 2024 season. Following an injury to Christian Yelich, Miller was called up for the first time that season on April 16, 2024. In 14 games for Milwaukee, he went 5–for–27 (.185) with three RBI. On July 1, Miller was designated for assignment by the Brewers. He cleared waivers and was sent outright to Nashville on July 5.

=== Colorado Rockies ===
On November 2, 2024, the Brewers traded Miller to the Colorado Rockies in exchange for cash considerations. He was assigned to the Triple-A Albuquerque Isotopes to begin the 2025 season. On April 25, 2025, the Rockies selected Miller's contract, adding him to their active roster. In nine appearances for Colorado, he went 2-for-14 (.143) with one RBI, one stolen base, and two walks. Miller was designated for assignment by the Rockies on May 16. He cleared waivers and elected free agency on May 20. Miller re-signed with the Rockies on a minor league contract on May 28. He elected free agency following the season on November 6.

=== Chicago Cubs ===
On February 3, 2026, Miller signed a minor league contract with the Chicago Cubs. He made 96 appearances for the Triple–A Iowa Cubs, batting .296/.350/.457 with seven home runs, 57 RBI, and 10 stolen bases. On August 17, Chicago selected Miller's contract, adding him to their active roster. He made one appearance for the team as a pinch runner for Tyrone Taylor in a 7–5 victory over the Chicago White Sox that day. Miller was designated for assignment by the Cubs on August 21; he cleared waivers and was sent outright to Triple–A Iowa on August 24. He elected free agency on October 5.

== Personal life ==
Miller's younger brother, Noah, was selected by the Minnesota Twins with the 36th overall selection in the 2021 MLB draft. He is currently a part of the Los Angeles Dodgers organization.
