= Noah Miller (baseball) =

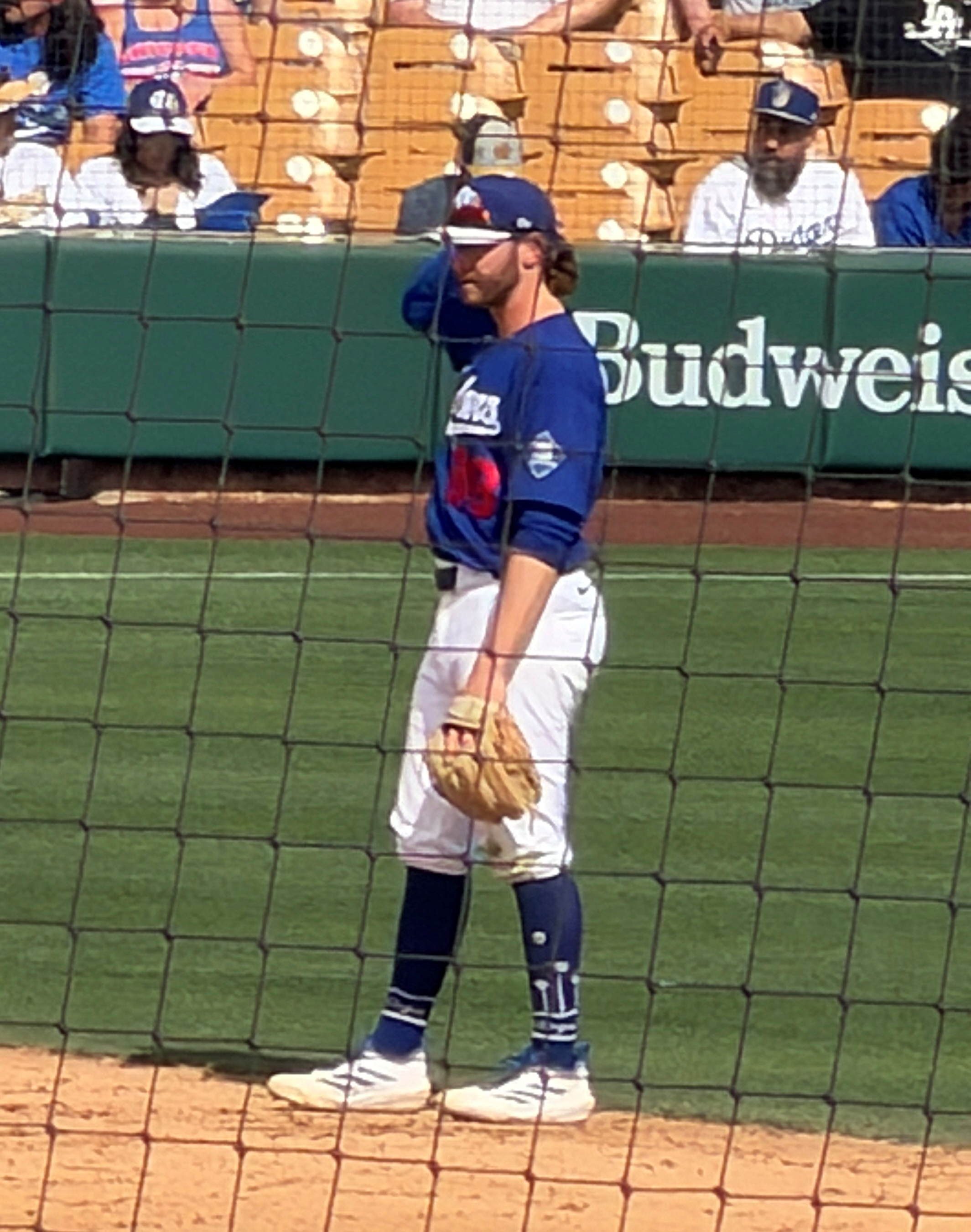
- Miller playing in a 2026 spring training game

Los Angeles Dodgers
- Shortstop
- Born: November 12, 2002 (age 23); Fredonia, Wisconsin, U.S.
- Bats: Switch Throws: Right
- Stats at Baseball Reference

Noah Anthony Miller (born November 12, 2002) is an American baseball shortstop for the Los Angeles Dodgers organization. He was selected by the Minnesota Twins of Major League Baseball (MLB) in the 2021 MLB draft.

== Early life ==
Miller was born on November 12, 2002, in Fredonia, Wisconsin. As a senior at Ozaukee High School in Ozaukee County, Wisconsin, Miller batted .608, with six home runs and 21 runs batted in (RBIs), as well as 14 stolen bases and 41 runs scored. The Wisconsin Baseball Coaches Association named Miller the Division 3 player of the year for his performance. At the end of his high school career, Perfect Game named Miller the top prospect in the state of Wisconsin, the No. 13 shortstop prospect in the nation, and the No. 49 overall prospect.

== Playing career ==
=== Minnesota Twins ===
The Minnesota Twins of Major League Baseball (MLB) selected Miller 36th overall in the 2021 MLB draft. He was part of the first competitive balance round in that year's draft, placed between the first and second regular draft rounds. The Twins had considered Miller a "strong candidate" for the 26th overall draft selection, which they ultimately used on pitcher Chase Petty, and were keen on selecting him 10 places later. At the time he was drafted, Miller had committed to play college baseball for the University of Alabama. Miller signed with Minnesota on July 22, 2021, for a bonus of $2,045,400. He made his professional debut for the Rookie-level Florida Complex League Twins on August 16, going 1-for-3 with a line drive single. In 22 FCL games and 84 at bats, Miller batted .238 with two home runs and 14 RBIs.

Miller spent the 2022 season with the Twins' Single-A affiliate, the Fort Myers Mighty Mussels of the Florida State League, where he hit .212 in 108 games. In 2023, with the High–A Cedar Rapids Kernels he hit .233 in 120 games.

=== Los Angeles Dodgers ===
On February 26, 2024, Miller was traded by the Twins to the Los Angeles Dodgers in exchange for Manuel Margot, Rayne Doncon and cash considerations. Miller was selected to participate in the inaugural "Spring Breakout" minor league showcase during spring training 2024. In the Dodgers farm system, Miller played 101 games for the High– Great Lakes Loons and was then promoted to the Double–A Tulsa Drillers. Combined, he batted .244 in 134 games with six homers and 46 RBI. Miller began 2025 with Tulsa and was promoted during the season to the Triple–A Oklahoma City Comets. He played in 94 games (also including a brief rehab stint in the Arizona Complex League) and batted .260 with five homers and 51 RBI. Miller remained with Oklahoma City for the 2026 season, where he played in 142 games and batted .254 with 12 home runs and 70 RBI.

== Personal life ==
Miller is the younger brother of Owen Miller, an infielder who has played in MLB.
