= Manuel Margot =

Dominican baseball player (born 1994)

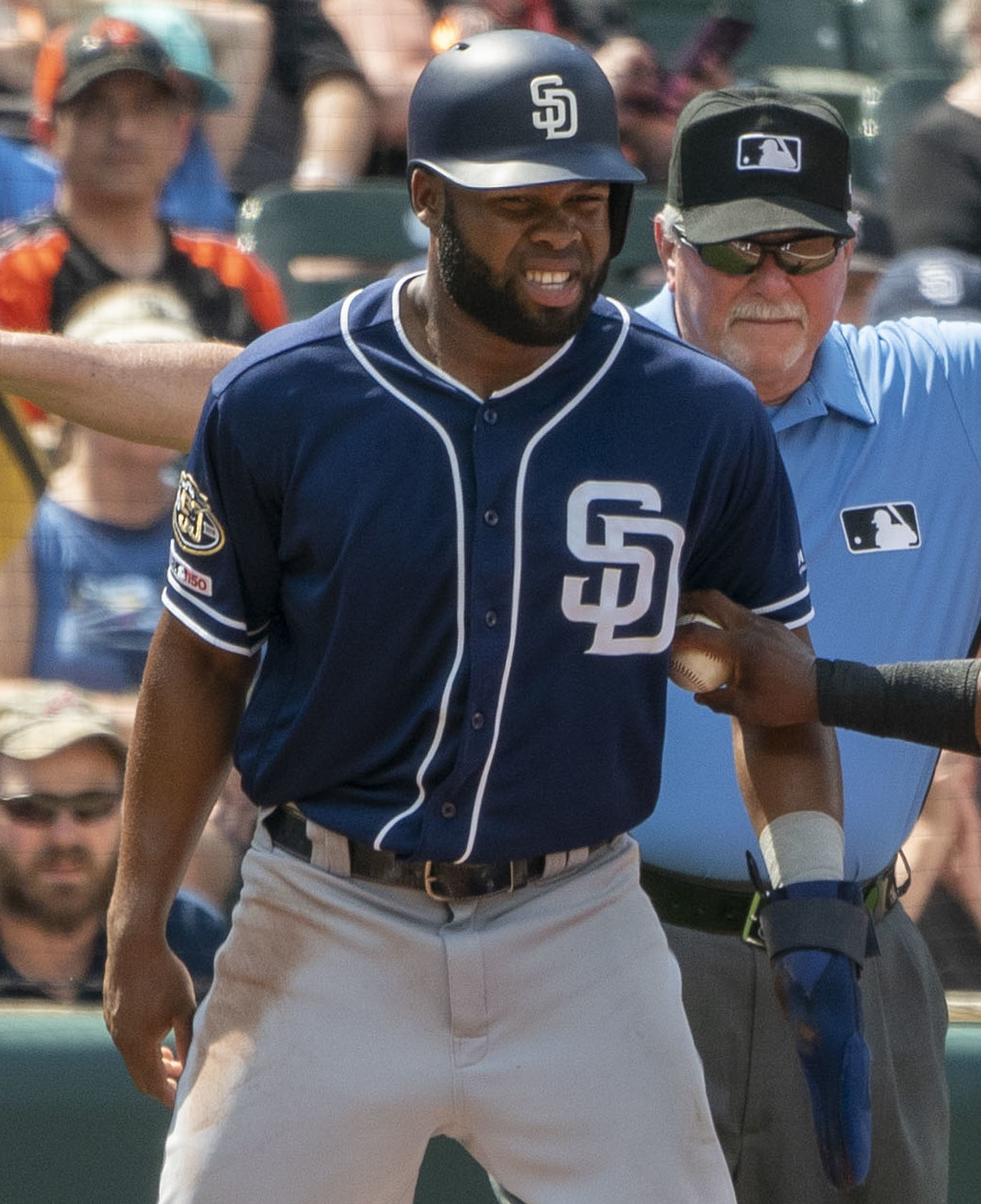
- Margot with the San Diego Padres in 2019

Free agent
- Center fielder
- Born: September 28, 1994 (age 31); San Cristóbal, Dominican Republic
- Bats: Right Throws: Right

MLB debut
- September 21, 2016, for the San Diego Padres

MLB statistics (through 2025 season)
- Batting average: .254
- Home runs: 56
- Runs batted in: 317
- Stats at Baseball Reference

Teams
- San Diego Padres (2016–2019); Tampa Bay Rays (2020–2023); Minnesota Twins (2024); Detroit Tigers (2025)

Manuel Margot Gomez (born September 28, 1994) is a Dominican professional baseball center fielder who is a free agent. He has previously played in Major League Baseball (MLB) for the San Diego Padres, Tampa Bay Rays, Minnesota Twins, and Detroit Tigers. He made his MLB debut in 2016 with the Padres.

== Professional career ==
=== Boston Red Sox ===
==== Minor leagues ====
The Boston Red Sox signed Margot as an international free agent from the Dominican Prospect League in July 2011, receiving a reported bonus of $800,000. At age 17, he started his professional career with Rookie Level Dominican Summer League Red Sox in their 2012 season. In his professional debut, Margot earned Red Sox Minor League Latin Program Player of the Year honors, after batting a .285/.382/.423 slash line with 38 stolen bases in just 68 games, gaining a spot on the DSL All-Star team. Regarded as a patient hitter, he walked more than he struck out in the DSL (36-to-25 in 260 at-bats).

Margot jumped up two levels to the Lowell Spinners in 2013, and played as the youngest regular in the Low-A New York–Penn League. Following his successful debut, Margot did manage to get a hit in 12 out of his first 15 games with Lowell, collecting a .254/.343/.307 line through July 24, when a hamstring injury laid him up. After a disabled list stint, he returned on August 16 showing glimpses of his potential with a .447/.475/.658 line over his first eight games back. He finished the year with a .270 average and 18 stolen bases in only 49 games.

Margot played for the Low-A Greenville Drive of the South Atlantic League in 2014. In his first 99 games at Greenville, he posted a .282/.362/.418 line with 10 home runs and 45 runs batted in, while leading the Drive with 105 hits and 61 runs scored, and the Red Sox organization with 39 stolen bases. As a result, he was promoted to High-A Salem Red Sox of the Carolina League on August 15. In 2014, Margot hit .340/.356/.560 in just 18 games for Salem, combining for a .293/.356/.462 line with 12 homers and 59 RBI in 115 contests in the two stints. Besides, he led the Sox minors system with 42 stolen bases. It was just the latest part in what was a very solid season in the organization despite his youth. As such, he climbed from No. 11 to No. 4 in the MLB.com Top 20 Boston Red Sox Prospects list.

In 2015, Margot improved his slash line up to .282/.321/.420 through 46 games with Salem, and earned a promotion to the Double-A Portland Sea Dogs in the midseason. His five triples were tied for third-most in the Carolina League, while his 20 steals in 25 attempts ranked fourth in the circuit at the time of his promotion. Soon after, MLB.com announced that he would be member of the World Team in the Futures Game prior to the Major League All-Star Game. Margot then posted a combined .271/.326/.419 batting line with 25 extra bases and 19 steals over 109 games played for the Sea Dogs. During the Sea Dogs annual Field of Dream Fan Appreciation Game at Hadlock Field, he hit for the cycle and drove in a season-high five runs as the Sea Dogs topped the New Britain Rock Cats, 10–5, becoming the first ever Portland player to hit a cycle at Hadlock Field.

=== San Diego Padres ===
On November 13, 2015, the San Diego Padres acquired Margot, Javier Guerra, Carlos Asuaje, and Logan Allen from the Red Sox for Craig Kimbrel. On November 19, 2015, the Padres added Margot to their 40-man roster to protect him from the Rule 5 draft.

Margot began the 2016 season with the Triple-A El Paso Chihuahuas, where he played in 124 games, including 117 starts in center field. He batted .304 with 6 home runs and a .777 OPS.

==== Major leagues ====
The Padres promoted Margot to the major leagues for the first time on September 21, 2016. Margot made his major league debut as a pinch runner and defensive replacement the same day, against the Arizona Diamondbacks. He recorded his first MLB hit on a single to center field off Derek Law of the San Francisco Giants on September 24. In his debut season, Margot played in 10 games, including seven starts in center field and one in right. He had nine hits in 37 at-bats.

Despite a knee injury that limited his playing time in spring training, Margot made the 2017 Opening Day roster as the starting center fielder. He hit five extra-base hits in his first six games of the 2017 season, including two home runs in consecutive plate appearances against San Francisco Giants starter Matt Cain on April 8, and two doubles off Giants starter Madison Bumgarner on April 9. Margot missed about a month of the season in May and June with a calf injury but finished the 2017 season with a .263/.313/.409 batting line with 13 home runs in 126 games, including 121 starts in center field. He finished sixth in the NL Rookie of the Year voting.

Margot was the Padres regular center fielder in 2018, starting 123 games there, and only missing 10 days on the disabled list with bruised ribs in April. His batting line on the season dropped to .245/.292/.384 with 8 home runs and 11 stolen bases. He was considered to be a plus defender in center field, without making many highlight plays.

Margot began losing time in center field in 2019, making 98 starts there while Wil Myers picked up 58 of the center field starts. Margot effectively became part of a platoon with left-handed hitting corner outfielder Josh Naylor in the latter part of the season. Margot still played in a career-high 151 games on the season, often coming in as a pinch hitter or defensive replacement. Margot batted .234/.304/.387 on the year, with 12 home runs in 398 at-bats. He had 20 stolen bases in 24 attempts. On defense, Margot led the Padres with 11 outs above average, ranking fourth in the National League.

=== Tampa Bay Rays ===
On February 8, 2020, the Padres traded Margot and prospect Logan Driscoll to the Tampa Bay Rays in exchange for Emilio Pagán. Before being traded to the Rays, Margot had only played eight innings not in center field. However, the defensive prowess of Kevin Kiermaier caused Margot to play more innings in left and right field. Margot ended the season batting .269 with one home run and 12 stolen bases. The Rays ended the season with the best record in the American League. In the Wild Card Series against the Toronto Blue Jays, Margot went three for seven with one home run and three RBIs. In the Division Series against the New York Yankees, Margot went one for nine with a two-run home run. The Rays would beat the Yankees in five games. In Game 1 of the ALCS against the Houston Astros, Margot hit a three-run home run in the first inning. In the second inning, Margot flipped over the wall in right field to record an out on a foul ball. Despite this game being played in his former home field (Petco Park), Margot was unaware that the drop over this wall was approximately six feet. In game 6 of the ALCS, Margot hit two home runs recording three RBIs as the Rays lost by three. In the 2020 World Series against the Los Angeles Dodgers, Margot had six hits in 19 at-bats In Game 5, he attempted to steal home in the fourth inning but was called out after a close putout at the plate to end the inning.

Margot played in 125 games for the Rays during the 2021 season. In 421 at–bats, he hit .254/.313/.382 with 10 home runs, 57 RBI, and 13 stolen bases. He had one hit in seven at-bats in the ALDS against the Boston Red Sox. On April 5, 2022, Margot and the Rays agreed to a two-year contract extension worth $19 million, with a mutual option for 2025. On June 20, Margot suffered a sprained knee while crashing into the wall and did not rejoin the team until August 20. In 89 games in 2022, Margot hit .274 and in 99 games in 2023, he hit .264.

=== Minnesota Twins ===
On December 16, 2023, the Rays traded Margot and Tyler Glasnow to the Los Angeles Dodgers in exchange for Ryan Pepiot and Jonny DeLuca. Then, on February 26, 2024, the Dodgers traded him, Rayne Doncon and cash considerations to the Minnesota Twins in exchange for Noah Miller. In 129 appearances for Minnesota, Margot slashed .238/.289/.337 with four home runs, 31 RBI, and five stolen bases. The Twins declined his option at the end of the season, making him a free agent.

=== Detroit Tigers ===
On February 21, 2025, Margot signed a minor league contract with the Milwaukee Brewers. He was released prior of the start of the season on March 22.

On March 23, 2025, Margot signed a one-year, $1.3 million contract with the Detroit Tigers. In six games for Detroit, he went 6-for-19 (.316) with three RBI. Margot was placed on the 10-day injured list on April 8, with left knee inflammation. Upon his activation from the injured list on May 7, Margot was removed from the 40-man roster and sent outright to the Triple-A Toledo Mud Hens. On July 8, Margot was released by the Tigers.

== Personal life ==
Margot's wife, Rachell, gave birth to a son, Diamond, in July 2017. The family added a second child in April 2019.
