= Eric Orze =

American baseball player (born 1997)

Chicago Cubs
- Pitcher
- Born: August 21, 1997 (age 29); Elk Grove, Illinois, U.S.
- Bats: Right Throws: Right

MLB debut
- July 8, 2024, for the New York Mets

MLB statistics (through 2026 season)
- Win–loss record: 3–4
- Earned run average: 4.68
- Strikeouts: 77
- Stats at Baseball Reference

Teams
- New York Mets (2024); Tampa Bay Rays (2025); Minnesota Twins (2026)

Eric Paul Orze (born August 21, 1997) is an American professional baseball pitcher for the Chicago Cubs of Major League Baseball (MLB). He has previously played in MLB for the New York Mets, Tampa Bay Rays, and Minnesota Twins. He made his MLB debut in 2024.

== Career ==
Orze attended Glenbard North High School in Carol Stream, Illinois, and the University of New Orleans, where he played college baseball for the New Orleans Privateers. While at New Orleans, he was diagnosed with testicular cancer and skin cancer.

=== New York Mets ===
The New York Mets selected Orze in the fifth round, with the 150th overall pick, of the 2020 Major League Baseball draft. He did not play in a game in 2020 due to the cancellation of the minor league season because of the COVID-19 pandemic. Orze made his professional debut in 2021 with the High–A Brooklyn Cyclones and was promoted to the Double–A Binghamton Rumble Ponies and Triple–A Syracuse Mets during the season. Over 34 relief appearances between the three teams, Orze went 4–2 with a 3.08 ERA and 67 strikeouts over 49 2/3 innings.

Orze spent the majority of 2022 with Syracuse, also making two scoreless appearances for the Single–A St. Lucie Mets. In 32 appearances out of the bullpen for Syracuse, he recorded a 5.13 ERA with 64 strikeouts across 47 1/3 innings pitched. Orze returned to Syracuse in 2023, making 39 appearances and posting a 3–4 record and 5.31 ERA with 81 strikeouts over 61 innings.

Orze began the 2024 campaign with Syracuse, compiling a 3.76 ERA with 56 strikeouts and two saves across 38 1/3 innings pitched. On July 6, 2024, Orze was selected to the 40-man roster and promoted to the major leagues for the first time. He made two appearances during his rookie campaign, striking out one batter across 1 2/3 innings pitched.

=== Tampa Bay Rays ===
On November 19, 2024, the Mets traded Orze to the Tampa Bay Rays in exchange for Jose Siri. He was optioned to the Triple-A Durham Bulls to begin the 2025 season. On June 13, 2025, Orze recorded his first career win after tossing a scoreless inning of relief against the New York Mets. He made 33 appearances for Tampa Bay, compiling a 1-1 record and 3.02 ERA with 40 strikeouts and three save across 41 2/3 innings pitched.

=== Minnesota Twins ===
On November 18, 2025, the Rays traded Orze to the Minnesota Twins in exchange for prospect Jacob Kisting. Orze made 36 appearances out of the bullpen for Minnesota in 2026, posting a 2–2 record and 5.66 ERA with 36 strikeouts and one save across 41 1/3 innings pitched.

=== Chicago Cubs ===
On November 2, 2026, Orze was claimed off of waivers by the Chicago Cubs.
