= Tyler Glasnow =

American baseball player (born 1993)

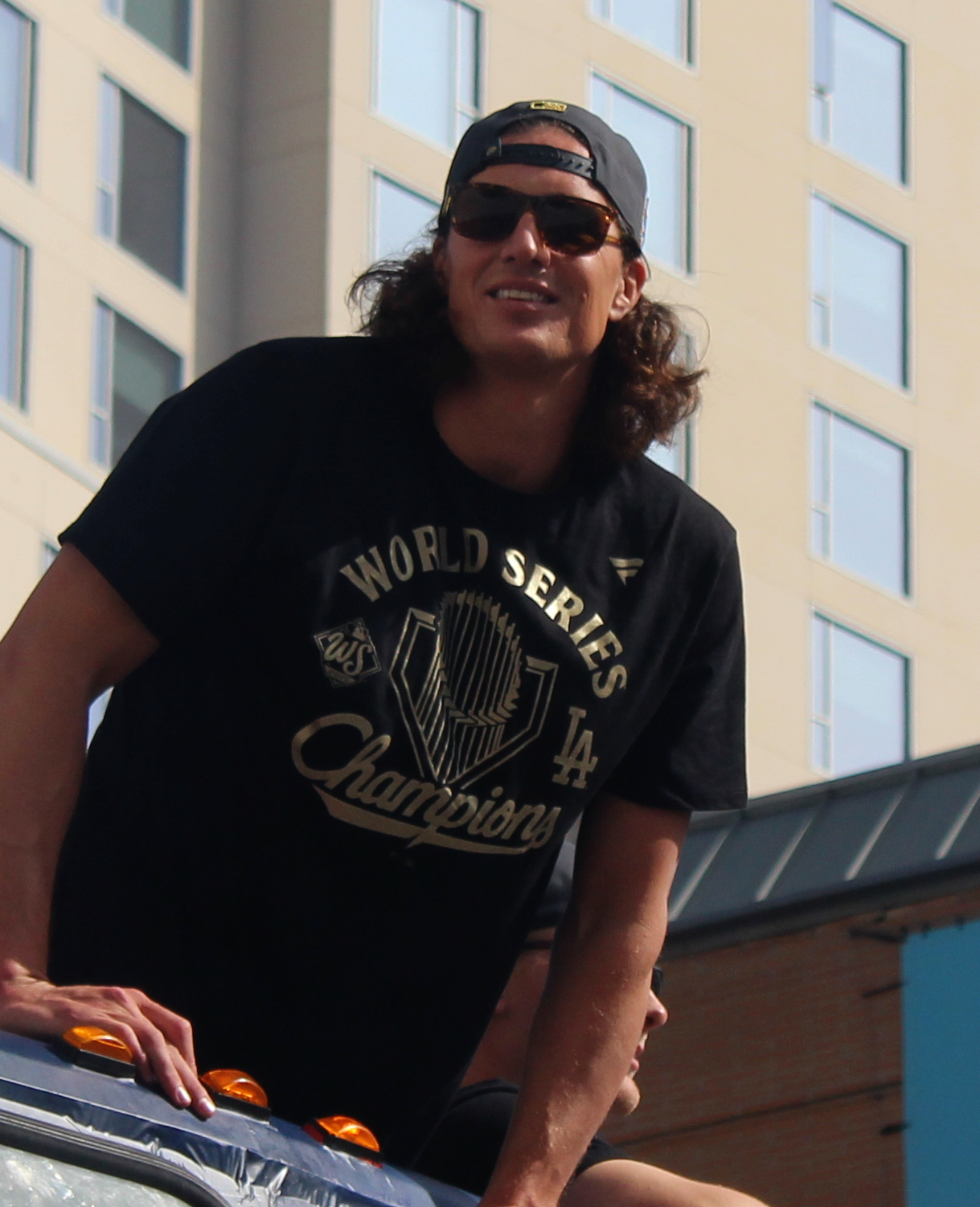
- Glasnow at the 2025 Dodgers parade

Los Angeles Dodgers – No. 31
- Pitcher
- Born: August 23, 1993 (age 33); Newhall, California, U.S.
- Bats: Left Throws: Right

MLB debut
- July 7, 2016, for the Pittsburgh Pirates

MLB statistics (through 2026 season)
- Win–loss record: 48–38
- Earned run average: 3.72
- Strikeouts: 1,050
- Stats at Baseball Reference

Teams
- Pittsburgh Pirates (2016–2018); Tampa Bay Rays (2018–2023); Los Angeles Dodgers (2024–present)

Career highlights and awards
- All-Star (2024); 2× World Series champion (2024, 2025)

Tyler Allen Glasnow (born August 23, 1993) is an American professional baseball pitcher for the Los Angeles Dodgers of Major League Baseball (MLB). He has previously played in MLB for the Pittsburgh Pirates and Tampa Bay Rays. Glasnow made his MLB debut with the Pirates in 2016 and was traded to the Rays during the 2018 season. After six seasons with the Rays, Glasnow was traded to the Dodgers following the 2023 season, was named an All-Star in 2024, and won his first title in the 2024 World Series over the New York Yankees and his second 2025 World Series title over the Toronto Blue Jays.

== Early life ==
Glasnow was born on August 23, 1993, in Santa Clarita, California. He came from an athletic family: his father Greg swam and played water polo, his mother Donna is a retired gymnast who went on to coach for Cal State Northridge, and his older brother Ted was a decathlete for the Notre Dame Fighting Irish. Greg and Donna have been hardwood retailers in the Santa Clarita Valley since 1979. Glasnow attended William S. Hart High School in Santa Clarita, the alma mater of other Major League Baseball (MLB) pitchers James Shields, Trevor Bauer, and Mike Montgomery.

== Career ==
Glasnow attended William S. Hart High School in Santa Clarita, California. He committed to play college baseball for the University of Portland.

=== Pittsburgh Pirates (2011–2018) ===
==== Minor leagues ====
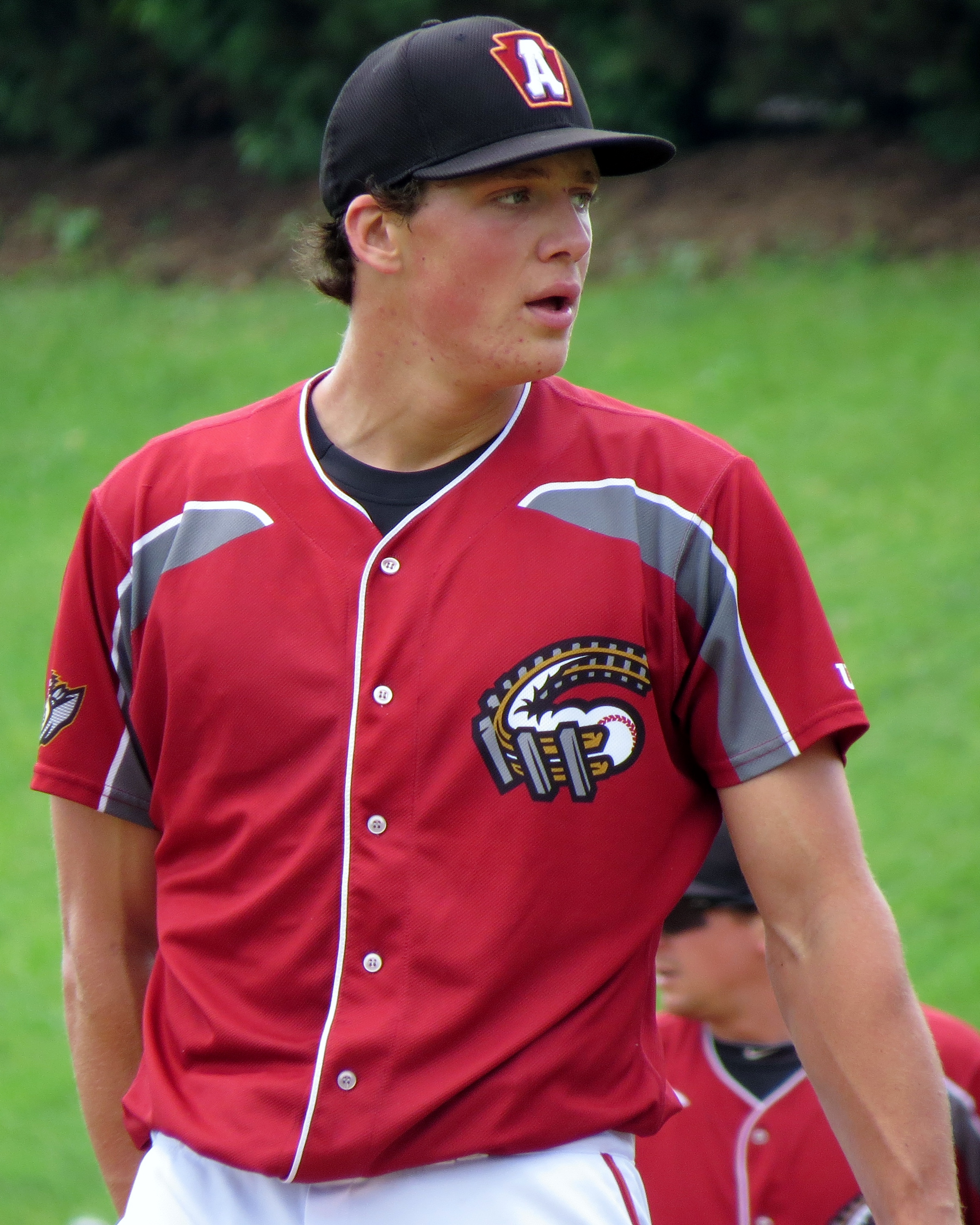
Glasnow with the Altoona Curve in 2015

The Pittsburgh Pirates selected Glasnow in the fifth round (152nd overall) of the 2011 Major League Baseball draft. Glasnow signed with the Pirates for a $600,000 signing bonus.

Glasnow made his professional debut in 2012 for the Gulf Coast League Pirates of the Rookie-level Gulf Coast League in 2012 where he went 0–3 with a 2.10 ERA in 11 games (ten starts), and also started one game for the State College Spikes of the Low-A New York–Penn League. In 2013, he played for the West Virginia Power of the Single-A South Atlantic League. Glasnow started 24 games and finished the season with 9–3 record, a 2.18 ERA and 164 strikeouts in 111.1 innings. His 164 strikeouts were the most in a single season in Power franchise history, surpassing Will Inman's 134 in 2006.

Glasnow played for the Bradenton Marauders of the High-A Florida State League in 2014. In 23 starts for Bradenton, he compiled a 12–5 record and 1.74 ERA. After beginning the 2015 season with the Altoona Curve of the Double-A Eastern League, he sprained his ankle on May 6 and made his return on June 19 with the West Virginia Black Bears of the New York–Penn League. After two starts with West Virginia, Glasnow returned to Altoona. In late July, the Pirates promoted Glasnow to the Indianapolis Indians of the Triple-A International League. The Pirates considered promoting Glasnow to the major leagues in 2015, but decided against it. In 22 starts between the three clubs, Glasnow was 7–5 with a 2.39 ERA and 136 strikeouts in 109 1/3 innings. After the 2015 season, the Pirates added Glasnow to their 40-man roster. He began the 2016 season with Indianapolis and had a 1.87 ERA and 133 strikeouts in 110 2/3 innings pitched across 20 games started.

==== Major leagues ====
The Pirates promoted Glasnow to make his major league debut on July 7, 2016. He pitched 5 1/3 innings in his major league debut, giving up four runs on three hits and two walks. Glasnow's first MLB strikeout was of Aledmys Díaz of the St. Louis Cardinals. In his second start, he left the game after three innings with a shoulder injury. Glasnow returned to the active roster in September as a relief pitcher and did not start another game until September 25. In 23 1/3 innings pitched for Pittsburgh in 2016, Glasnow was 0–2 with a 4.24 ERA and 24 strikeouts.

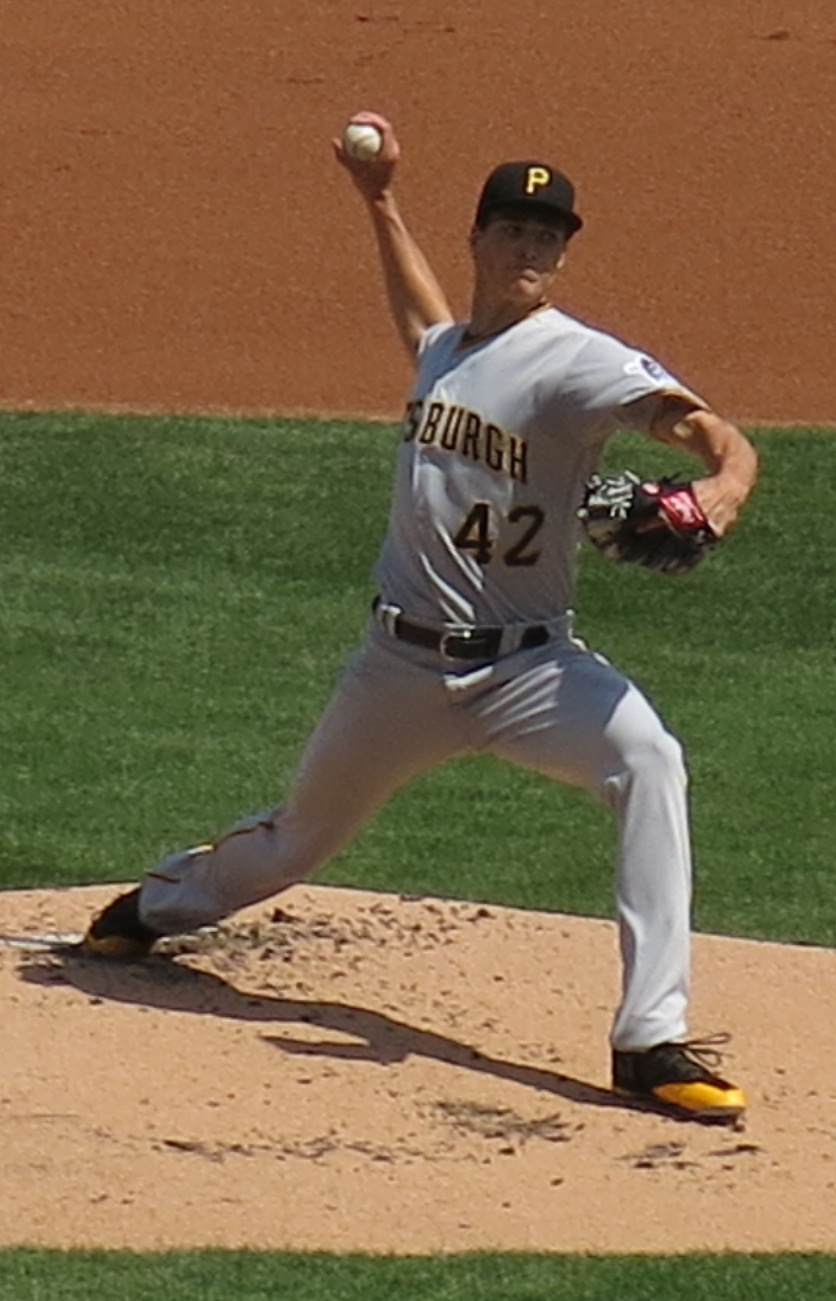
Glasnow with the Pirates in 2017

Glasnow began 2017 in Pittsburgh's starting rotation. In his first start of 2017, he struggled with his command, giving up five runs on four hits and five walks in 1 2/3 innings pitched. Glasnow was optioned to Indianapolis in June after compiling a 7.45 ERA and 1.91 WHIP over 12 starts. He spent the remainder of the season with Indianapolis, where he was 9–2 with a 1.93 ERA over 15 starts, before returning to Pittsburgh during September call-ups. In 15 games for the Pirates, he compiled a 2–7 record, a 7.69 ERA, and a 2.012 WHIP. During spring training in 2018, the Pirates decided that Glasnow would start the 2018 season as a relief pitcher and he appeared in 34 games with a 4.34 ERA in 56 innings.

=== Tampa Bay Rays (2018–2023) ===
On July 31, 2018, Glasnow was traded to the Tampa Bay Rays, along with Austin Meadows and a player to be named later (Shane Baz) for Chris Archer. He was immediately inserted into their starting rotation. In his 11 starts with Tampa Bay, Glasnow posted an earned run average of 4.20, recording 64 strikeouts in 55 2/3 innings.

After starting the 2019 season 5–0 with a 1.75 earned run average, Glasnow was named the American League Pitcher of the Month for April. He strained his arm against the Yankees on May 10 which kept him on the injured list until September. He returned to make four starts, none of them lasting more than five innings. He finished the 2019 season with a 6–1 record and a 1.78 ERA in 60 2/3 innings. Glasnow started two games in the American League Division Series against the Houston Astros, losing both of them.

In the pandemic shortened 2020 season, Glasnow was 5–1 with a 4.08 ERA in 11 starts. In the postseason, Glasnow started the clinching game in both the Wild Card round (Blue Jays) and Division Series (Yankees). In Game 5 of the ALDS, he started the game on two days' rest. This was the second straight year Glasnow started the fifth game of the ALDS for the Rays; both times he faced off against his former teammate Gerrit Cole. Glasnow became the second pitcher since 1980 to start a game on two days' rest. He started two games of the World Series against the Los Angeles Dodgers, losing both games and allowing 10 earned runs in 9 1/3 innings.

Glasnow began the 2021 season by making 14 starts, with a 5–2 record and 2.66 ERA. However, on June 15 he was diagnosed with partial tears in the ulnar collateral ligament and a flexor strain of his right elbow, which he blamed on him adjusting his routine as a result of recent MLB rule changes. After an unsuccessful attempt to rehab the injury, it was revealed that he needed Tommy John surgery. This caused him to miss the rest of 2021 and most of 2022 as well.

On August 22, 2022, the Rays and Glasnow agreed to a contract extension through the 2024 season, that would pay him $5.35 million in 2023 and $25 million in 2024. On September 28, he was activated off the injured list made his 2022 season debut against the Cleveland Guardians that night, pitching three innings with three strikeouts while allowing one earned run. After one more regular season start, Glasnow was named the starting pitcher for the Rays in Game 2 of the AL Wild Card Series between the Rays and the Guardians; he allowed two hits and recorded five strikeouts over five scoreless innings.

On February 28, 2023, it was announced that Glasnow would miss the beginning of the 2023 season with a Grade 2 strain of his left oblique. He rejoined the rotation on May 27 and made 21 starts in 2023, with a 10–7 record and 3.53 ERA. He also started the first game of the Wild Card Series against the Texas Rangers, taking the loss while allowing three earned runs in five innings.

=== Los Angeles Dodgers (2024–present) ===
On December 16, 2023, the Rays traded Glasnow and Manuel Margot to the Los Angeles Dodgers in exchange for Ryan Pepiot and Jonny DeLuca. Additionally, Glasnow agreed to a five-year contract extension for $136.5 million, which also included both club and player options for the 2028 season. Glasnow was selected to start for the Dodgers in the MLB Seoul Series opener against the San Diego Padres in South Korea. On March 28, he picked up his first win as a Dodger against the St. Louis Cardinals. On April 9, he threw seven scoreless innings and tied his career-high with 14 strikeouts against the Minnesota Twins. He also became the first pitcher to strike out 14 or more batters in a game while throwing fewer than 90 pitches since they first tracked pitches in 1988. Glasnow was selected to his first All-Star game in 2024. He had career highs in starts (22), innings pitched (134) and strikeouts (168) while producing a 9–6 record and 3.49 ERA. However, he did not pitch after August 11 because of a strained elbow that prematurely ended his season.

Glasnow returned to Los Angeles' rotation to begin the 2025 season, posting a 1–0 record and 4.50 ERA with 23 strikeouts over his first five starts. He was placed on the injured list due to right shoulder inflammation on April 28, 2025, and was transferred to the 60-day injured list on May 31. He was activated from the injured list and rejoined the rotation on July 9 against the Milwaukee Brewers. He made a total of 18 starts, with a 4–3 record, 3.19 ERA and 106 strikeouts. Glasnow made his Dodgers post-season debut by pitching 1 2/3 innings out of the bullpen against the Philadelphia Phillies in the opening game of the 2025 NLDS. He started the decisive fourth game of the series, striking out eight while allowing only two hits and three walks in six scoreless innings of a game the Dodgers eventually won in extra innings. His next start was in the third game of the 2025 NLCS against the Brewers, allowing one run on three hits and three walks with eight strikeouts in 5 2/3 innings as the Dodgers won on their way to a series sweep. Glasnow also started the third game of the 2025 World Series against the Toronto Blue Jays. He allowed four runs (only two of which were earned) on five hits and three walks in 4 2/3 innings of a game the Dodgers eventually won in 18 innings. He next came in to the ninth inning of Game 6 with two on and no outs and picked up his first career save on only three pitches – a popout and a double play. The following day in Game 7, he allowed one run on three hits in 2 1/3 innings in a game the Dodgers eventually won to take the series.

On May 6, 2026, in a game against the Houston Astros, Glasnow struck out Yordan Alvarez for his 1000th career strikeout, the fastest starting pitcher in Major League Baseball to achieve that milestone, reaching it in just 793 innings. However, he left that start shortly afterwards with back spasms. While initially optimistic that it would be a short term injury, Glasnow did not recover as expected and on June 6, he was placed on the 60-day injured list. He was activated by the team on August 25. On the season he made 13 starts, with a 5–2 record, 3.53 ERA and 98 strikeouts.

== International eligibility ==
Glasnow has expressed willingness to play for the United States national baseball team at the World Baseball Classic. He previously sought to play in the 2023 World Baseball Classic, but was denied by the Tampa Bay Rays since he was coming off of Tommy John surgery.

== Personal life ==
A Southern California native, Glasnow grew up a Dodger fan. He used to attend Dodgers games as a kid with his friends and family. His favorite Dodgers were starting pitcher Clayton Kershaw (later his teammate on the Dodgers), and outfielder Shawn Green. Glasnow is a fan of hip hop music and has two music-themed tattoos. On the inside of his lower lip, he has the words "No Juice" tattooed, a reference to the song "No Juice" by Lil Boosie. He used to have a tattoo of the rap artist Ol' Dirty Bastard on the sole of his right foot, but the image has faded. He is currently in a relationship with Meghan Murphy, whom he met in 2021 at a Tampa Bay Rays game.

== See also ==
- List of Major League Baseball single-inning strikeout leaders
- List of World Series starting pitchers

Awards and achievements
| Preceded by Julio Urías | Los Angeles Dodgers Opening Day starting pitcher 2024 | Succeeded by Yoshinobu Yamamoto |
