= Jonny DeLuca =

American baseball player (born 1998)

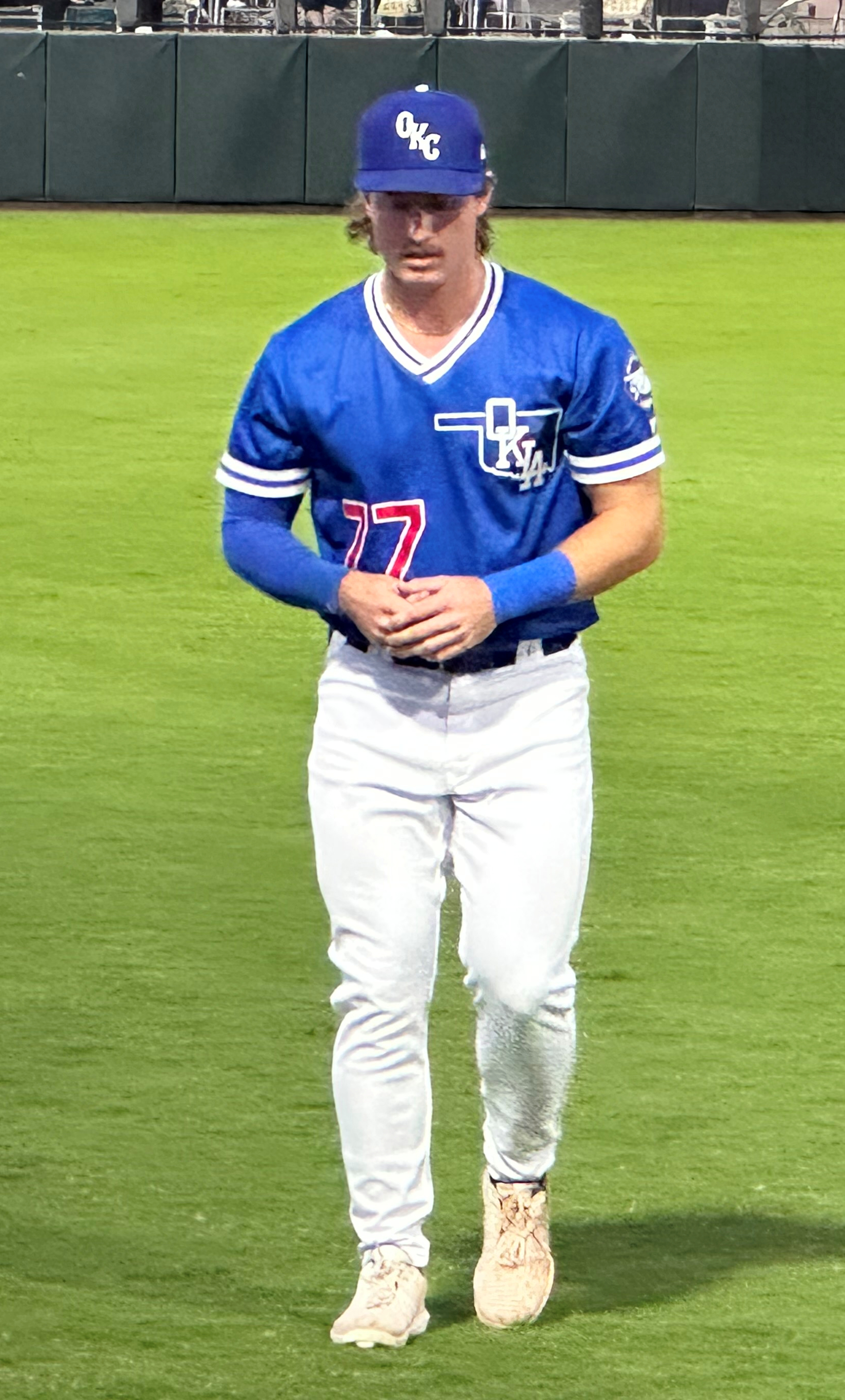
- DeLuca with the Oklahoma City Dodgers

Tampa Bay Rays – No. 21
- Outfielder
- Born: July 10, 1998 (age 28); Thousand Oaks, California, U.S.
- Bats: Right Throws: Right

MLB debut
- June 7, 2023, for the Los Angeles Dodgers

MLB statistics (through 2026 season)
- Batting average: .250
- Home runs: 19
- Runs batted in: 91
- Stats at Baseball Reference

Teams
- Los Angeles Dodgers (2023); Tampa Bay Rays (2024–present)

Jonathan Davis DeLuca (born July 10, 1998) is an American professional baseball outfielder for the Tampa Bay Rays of Major League Baseball (MLB). He has previously played in MLB for the Los Angeles Dodgers. He made his MLB debut in 2023 with the Dodgers.

== Amateur career ==
DeLuca attended Agoura High School in Agoura Hills, California. He was drafted by the Minnesota Twins in the 39th round of the 2017 Major League Baseball draft, but did not sign and played college baseball at the University of Oregon. In 2018, he played collegiate summer baseball with the Yarmouth–Dennis Red Sox of the Cape Cod Baseball League and was named a league all-star.

== Professional career ==
=== Los Angeles Dodgers ===
After two years at Oregon, DeLuca was drafted by the Los Angeles Dodgers in the 25th round, with the 761st overall selection, of the 2019 MLB draft and signed.

DeLuca made his professional debut with the rookie-level Arizona League Dodgers in 2019, where he hit .273 in 26 games. DeLuca did not play in a game in 2020 due to the cancellation of the minor league season because of the COVID-19 pandemic. He returned to action in 2021 to play for the Single-A Rancho Cucamonga Quakes and High-A Great Lakes Loons, hitting a combined .264 in 101 games with 22 home runs and 64 runs batted in (RBI). DeLuca started the 2022 season with Great Lakes before being promoted to the Double-A Tulsa Drillers. Between the two levels, he played in 98 games and hit .260 with 25 home runs and 71 RBI.

On November 15, 2022, the Dodgers added DeLuca to the 40-man roster to protect him from the Rule 5 draft. He returned to Tulsa to begin the 2023 season and was promoted to the Triple-A Oklahoma City Dodgers on May 16. After 17 games, DeLuca was called up to the major leagues for the first time on June 4. DeLuca made his debut against the Cincinnati Reds on June 7 as the starting centerfielder. He was hitless in two at-bats with a walk in his debut. His first major league hit was a single to center field off of Ranger Suárez of the Philadelphia Phillies on June 9. On July 4, 2023, DeLuca hit his first MLB home run off Ángel Perdomo of the Pittsburgh Pirates. He played in a total of 24 games in the majors, hitting .262 with two homers and six RBI before being optioned back to the minors. Between the two minor league levels he played at in 2023, he appeared in 73 games and hit .294 with 17 homers and 53 RBI.

=== Tampa Bay Rays ===
On December 16, 2023, the Dodgers traded DeLuca and Ryan Pepiot to the Tampa Bay Rays in exchange for Tyler Glasnow and Manuel Margot. DeLuca made 107 appearances for Tampa Bay during the 2024 campaign, batting .217/.278/.331 with six home runs, 31 RBI, and 16 stolen bases.

DeLuca played in nine games for the Rays to begin 2025, hitting .435 with one RBI and four stolen bases. On April 8, 2025, he was placed on the injured list due to a right shoulder strain. DeLuca was transferred to the 60-day injured list on May 27. He was activated from the injured list on July 25. In 20 appearances for Tampa Bay, DeLuca batted .333/.356/.456 with four RBI and six stolen bases. On August 8, DeLuca was placed back on the injured list due to a left hamstring strain. He was transferred to the 60-day injured list on September 13, officially ending his season.

On May 25, 2026, DeLuca was ruled out for 6-to-8 weeks after suffering a right hamstring strain.
