= Edwin Uceta =

Dominican baseball player (born 1998)

Tampa Bay Rays – No. 63
- Pitcher
- Born: January 9, 1998 (age 28); Villa Los Almácigos, Dominican Republic
- Bats: Right Throws: Right

MLB debut
- April 30, 2021, for the Los Angeles Dodgers

MLB statistics (through 2025 season)
- Win–loss record: 12–6
- Earned run average: 3.70
- Strikeouts: 201
- Stats at Baseball Reference

Teams
- Los Angeles Dodgers (2021); Arizona Diamondbacks (2022); New York Mets (2023); Tampa Bay Rays (2024–2025)

Edwin Daniel Uceta (born January 9, 1998) is a Dominican professional baseball pitcher for the Tampa Bay Rays of Major League Baseball (MLB). He has previously played in MLB for the Los Angeles Dodgers, Arizona Diamondbacks, and New York Mets.

== Career ==
=== Los Angeles Dodgers ===
Uceta signed with the Dodgers organization for $10,000 on July 2, 2016, when he was 16 years old. He spent that season with the Dominican Summer League Dodgers, where he was 2–1 with a 1.72 ERA in 31 1/3 innings over 11 games (3 starts). The following season he was assigned to the Ogden Raptors of the rookie-class Pioneer League, where he was the starting pitcher in the league championship game that the Raptors won. In 2018, he was promoted to the Class-A Great Lakes Loons of the Midwest League and recognized as one of the Dodgers top-30 prospects by MLB Pipeline. He was 5–6 with a 3.20 ERA in 20 starts for the Loons. He split the 2019 season between the Rancho Cucamonga Quakes of the California League and the Tulsa Drillers of the Texas League, pitching to a combined 11–2 record and 2.77 ERA in 26 games (24 of them starts). He was a mid-season all-star for the Quakes and started the Texas League Championship Game, pitching four scoreless innings in game the Drillers ultimately lost late.

The Dodgers added Uceta to their 40-man roster after the 2020 season. On April 29, 2021, Uceta was promoted to the major leagues for the first time. He made his debut the next day as the starting pitcher against the Milwaukee Brewers. In the game, he took the loss as he allowed four hits and two runs in two innings while recording his first MLB strikeout of Travis Shaw. He pitched in 14 games for the Dodgers major league squad, with a record of 0–3 and a 6.64 ERA over 20 1/3 innings. In the minor leagues, he appeared in 10 games (with three starts) for the Triple-A Oklahoma City Dodgers, with a 4.71 ERA and a 2–3 record. He was designated for assignment by the Dodgers on October 21, 2021.

=== Arizona Diamondbacks ===
On October 27, 2021, Uceta was claimed off of waivers by the Arizona Diamondbacks. He made 10 appearances for the Diamondbacks in 2022, logging a 5.82 ERA with 13 strikeouts in 17.0 innings pitched and compiled a 6–1 record and 4.86 ERA in 28 appearances in his time with the Triple-A Reno Aces.

On January 5, 2023, Uceta was designated for assignment by Arizona to make space on the 40-man roster for the newly signed Evan Longoria.

=== New York Mets ===
On January 11, 2023, Uceta was claimed off waivers by the Detroit Tigers. Uceta was optioned to the Triple-A Toledo Mud Hens to begin the 2023 season. He was designated for assignment on March 30. On April 2, Uceta was claimed off waivers by the Pittsburgh Pirates and optioned to the Triple-A Indianapolis Indians. He was designated for assignment on April 4, after Tyler Heineman was selected to the roster.

On April 6, 2023, Uceta was claimed off waivers by the New York Mets and optioned to the Triple-A Syracuse Mets. On April 17, Uceta was recalled to the major league roster after José Butto was sent down. On April 22, Uceta suffered a left ankle sprain in a game against the San Francisco Giants, and was replaced on the active roster by Butto. He began a rehab assignment with Triple-A Syracuse on May 8. On June 9, Uceta underwent surgery to repair a torn meniscus in his left knee, and was ruled out for at least eight weeks. After rehabbing with the Single–A St. Lucie Mets, he was activated on August 13, and subsequently optioned to Triple–A Syracuse. He only made one appearance for the Mets, striking out three in three scoreless innings of work. On August 16, Uceta was designated for assignment following the promotion of Dennis Santana.

=== Chicago Cubs ===
On August 18, 2023, Uceta was claimed off waivers by the Chicago Cubs. On August 25, Uceta was removed from the 40–man roster and sent outright to the Triple–A Iowa Cubs. After struggling to a 16.20 ERA across 5 games for Iowa, Uceta was released by the Cubs organization on September 12.

=== Tampa Bay Rays ===
On December 10, 2023, Uceta signed a minor league contract with the Tampa Bay Rays. After 10 appearances with the Triple–A Durham Bulls, the Rays added him to their major league roster on May 6, 2024. Uceta collected his first professional save on August 20, against the Oakland Athletics. He was suspended for three games following a pitch thrown at Nick Castellanos in a game against the Philadelphia Phillies on September 10. In 30 total appearances for the Rays, Uceta compiled a 2–0 record and 1.51 ERA with 57 strikeouts and five saves across 41 2/3 innings pitched.

Uceta made 70 appearances out of the bullpen for Tampa Bay during the 2025 season, accumulating a 10–3 record and 3.79 ERA with 103 strikeouts and one save over 76 innings of work.

Uceta began the 2026 campaign on the injured list due to a right shoulder impingement. On April 20, 2026, Uceta was diagnosed with a subscapularis strain in the same shoulder, having suffered the injury during a rehabilitation assignment with Triple-A Durham. He was transferred to the 60-day injured list on April 24. He did not appear in a major league game in 2026.
