= Ryan Pepiot =

American baseball player (born 1997)

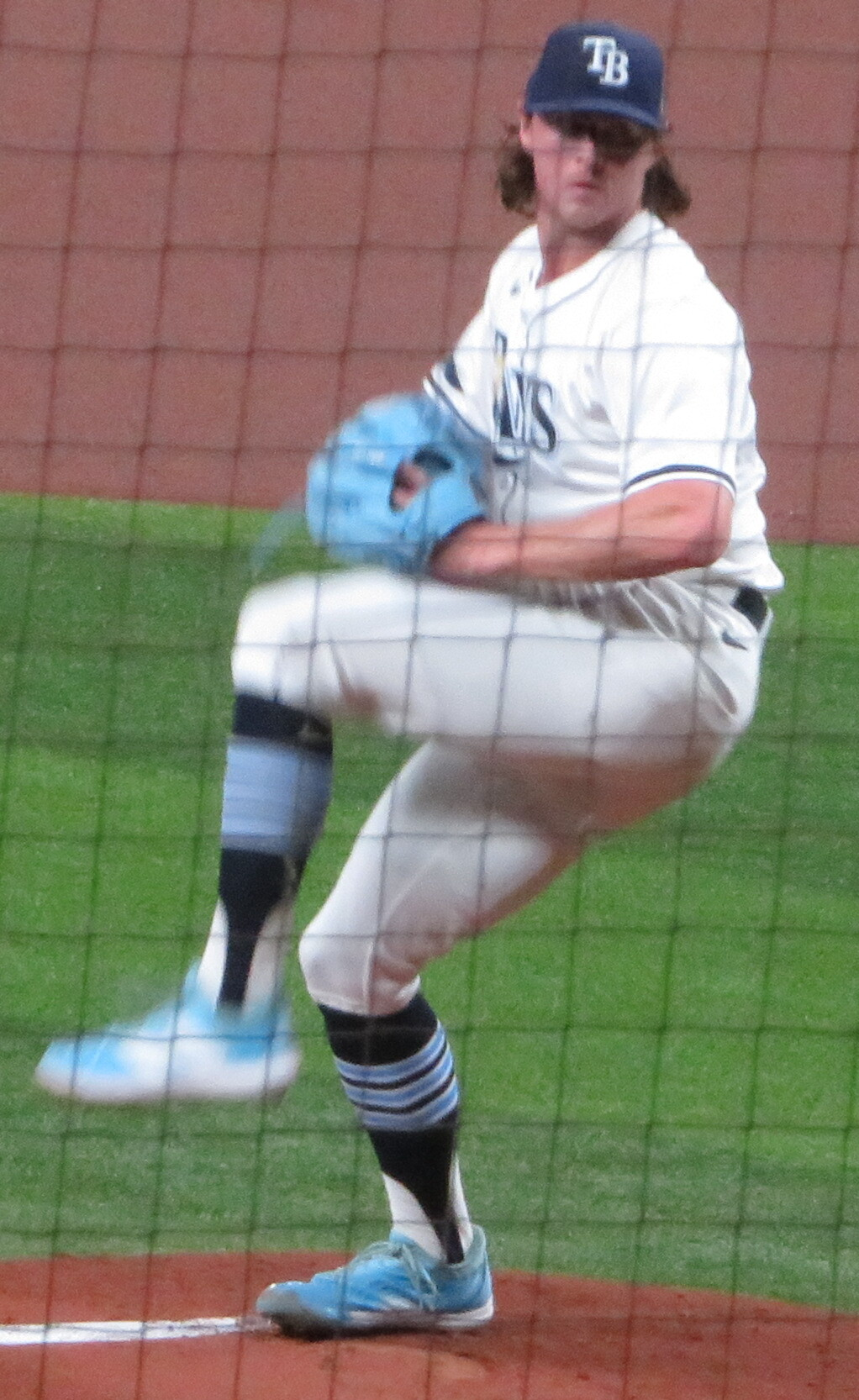
- Pepiot with the Tampa Bay Rays in 2024

Tampa Bay Rays – No. 44
- Pitcher
- Born: August 21, 1997 (age 29); Indianapolis, Indiana, U.S.
- Bats: Right Throws: Right

MLB debut
- May 11, 2022, for the Los Angeles Dodgers

MLB statistics (through 2025 season)
- Win–loss record: 24–21
- Earned run average: 3.54
- Strikeouts: 389
- Stats at Baseball Reference

Teams
- Los Angeles Dodgers (2022–2023); Tampa Bay Rays (2024–2025)

Ryan Michael Pepiot (/ˈpɛpioʊ/ PEP-ee-oh; born August 21, 1997) is an American professional baseball pitcher for the Tampa Bay Rays of Major League Baseball (MLB). He made his MLB debut in 2022 with the Los Angeles Dodgers.

== Early life and amateur career ==
Pepiot was born in Indianapolis, Indiana, and grew up in Westfield, Indiana, where he attended Westfield High School and played baseball, basketball, and football. In football, he was named Class 5-A All-State at quarterback as a senior.

Pepiot attended Butler University and played college baseball for the Butler Bulldogs for three seasons. After his sophomore year in 2018, Pepiot played collegiate summer baseball for the Hyannis Harbor Hawks of the Cape Cod Baseball League. As a junior, he went 4–4 with a 3.92 ERA in 14 starts while striking out a school record 126 batters over 78 innings. Pepiot finished the season as Butler's career leader in strikeouts with 306.

== Professional career ==
=== Los Angeles Dodgers ===
The Los Angeles Dodgers selected Pepiot in the third round of the 2019 MLB draft; he became the highest-drafted Butler player in program history. Pepiot signed with the Dodgers and was initially assigned to the Arizona League Dodgers before being promoted to the Class-A Great Lakes Loons of the Midwest League. He finished the season with 13 appearances (10 starts) between the two levels, recording no decisions with a 1.93 ERA and 31 strikeouts in 23.1 innings pitched. Pepiot was named to the Dodgers' 2021 Spring Training roster as a non-roster invitee. He began the 2021 season with the Double-A Tulsa Drillers, where he went 3–4 with a 2.87 ERA, 0.94 WHIP, and 81 strikeouts over 59 2/3 innings pitched before being promoted to the Triple-A Oklahoma City Dodgers. In his 11 games (nine starts) for Oklahoma City, he was 2–5 with a 7.13 ERA.

Pepiot began 2022 with Oklahoma City, where he started the season 2–0 with a 2.05 ERA in six starts with 36 strikeouts before he was promoted to the major leagues on May 11 to make his debut as the starting pitcher against the Pittsburgh Pirates on May 11, 2022. He struck out the first batter he faced, Ben Gamel, for his first MLB strikeout and pitched three scoreless innings with one hit, a hit batter and five walks while striking out three. On July 5, Pepiot picked up his first major league win against the Colorado Rockies. He pitched in nine games for the Dodgers, making seven starts, and finished with a 3–0 record and 3.47 ERA. He also made 19 appearances (17 starts) for Oklahoma City on the season and was 9–1 with a 2.56 ERA.

Pepiot was expected to open the 2023 season in the Dodgers starting rotation but strained his left oblique in his final spring training start and instead began the season on the injured list. After a few minor league starts, he rejoined the Dodgers on August 19. He made three starts and five "bulk" relief appearances, for a 2–1 record and 2.14 ERA.

=== Tampa Bay Rays ===
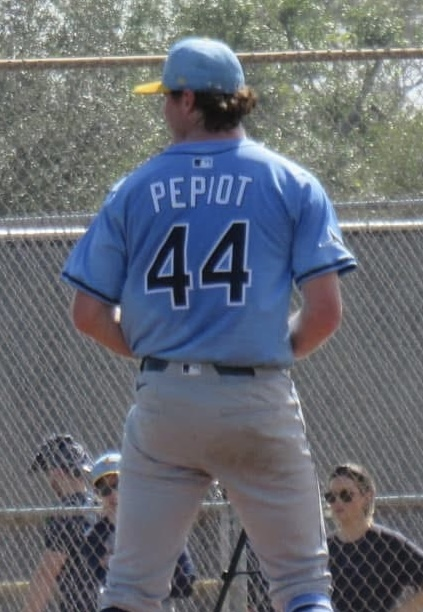
Pepiot in 2025

On December 16, 2023, the Dodgers traded Pepiot and Jonny DeLuca to the Tampa Bay Rays in exchange for Tyler Glasnow and Manuel Margot. On September 18, 2024, Pepiot recorded the 115th immaculate inning in MLB history, and the fourth in Rays history, against the Boston Red Sox. He made 26 total starts for Tampa Bay, logging an 8–8 record and 3.60 ERA with 142 strikeouts over 130 innings of work.

Pepiot was the Rays' Opening Day starter in 2025, pitching six innings and taking a no-decision in a 3–2 victory over the Colorado Rockies. He started 31 contests of the Rays during the regular season, compiling an 11–12 record and 3.86 ERA with 167 strikeouts across 167 2/3 innings pitched.

Pepiot began the 2026 season on the injured list due to right hip inflammation. He was transferred to the 60-day injured list on April 14, 2026. On May 1, the Rays announced Pepiot would undergo hip surgery and miss the entire season.
