= Dominican Summer League Rays =

- Boca Chica

Minor league affiliations
- Class: Rookie
- League: Dominican Summer League
- Division: Boca Chica Northwest

Major league affiliations
- Team: Tampa Bay Rays

Minor league titles
- League titles (1): 1 ( DSL Rays 1 2018 )

Team data
- Name: Rays
- Ballpark: Tampa Bay Rays Complex
- Owner(s)/ Operator(s): Tampa Bay Rays
- Manager: Esteban Gonzalez (DSL Rays 1); Julio Zorrilla (DSL Rays 2)

The Dominican Summer League Rays or DSL Rays are a Rookie League affiliate of the Tampa Bay Rays based in the Dominican Republic. They play in the Dominican Summer League. As an independent affiliate, they have been in existence since 1997.

== History ==
The team first came into existence in 1996, two years before the MLB debut of the Tampa Bay Devil Rays. They shared an affiliation with the then-California Angels and were known as the DSL Devil Rays/Angels.

From 1997 to 2001, the team was known as the DSL Devil Rays. They ceased operations from 2002 to 2006, before returning in 2007. In 2008, the team changed its name to the DSL Rays to correspond with the name change of the parent club.

== Rosters ==
Dominican Summer League Tampa Bay roster
Players		Coaches/Other
Pitchers: -- John Arias; 33 Luis Bautista ‡; 30 Ismael Cabral; -- Jensey Duran; 36 Misael De La Cruz; 49 Frailin Florian; 20 Ricardo Guzman; 50 Jimmy Javier; 48 Xavier Lopez; -- Yosniel Menendez; 32 Johanser Morales; -- Gabriel Paez; 49 Diego Palacios; -- Israel Paredes; 61 Rubender Pena; 41 Sebastian Perez; 35 Chariel Radney; 31 Efrailin Ramos; 37 Cesar Rojas; 29 Yereny Teus; 46 Miguel Toscano; -- Francis Valdez	Catchers: 9 Carlos De Sousa; 10 Alfredo Rodriguez; 25 Andres Torres; Infielders: 23 Andreimi Antunez; 7 Domingo Batista; 6 Israfell Bautista; -- Emmanuel Cedeno; -- Eliomar Garces; -- Xavier Guillen; -- Raymer Medina; 14 Yohangel Moris; 15 Alberth Palma; -- Warel Solano; 5 Wilian Trinidad; Outfielders: 8 Ismael Del Rosario; -- Alfonzo Martinez; 39 Moises Moreno; 13 Leonardo Pineda; -- Emile Torres	Manager: -- Henry Lugo; Coaches: -- Wilmer Dominguez (catching); -- Jiminson Natera (hitting); -- Luis Urena (pitching); 7-day injured list * On Tampa Bay Rays 40-man roster ~ Development list # Rehab assignment ∞ Reserve list ‡ Restricted list § Suspended list † Temporarily inactive list Roster updated March 2, 2025; Transactions → More rosters: MiLB • Dominican Summer League → Tampa Bay Rays minor league players

Dominican Summer League Rays roster
Players		Coaches/Other
Pitchers: 10 Damian Alcala; -- Anderson Alvarez; 27 Jhonny Aranguren; 30 Baldemix Cabrera; 25 Alexander Campos; 32 Frank Chessman; 24 Jharold Clemente; -- Ransel Cruz; 40 Alvaro Gamez; 27 Danny Hilario; 35 Jordi Infante; 33 Antawn Leal; 26 Yolvin Mesa; 43 Moises Palma; 31 Samuel Pateti; -- Wandy Perez; 45 Ricardo Ramirez; -- Starlin Savinon; 29 Yeison Silgado; -- Jean Tamayo	Catchers: 19 Deinys Gonzalez; -- Brainerh Palacios; -- Ivan Torres; 2 Jose Tovar; Infielders: 5 Angel Brachi; 1 Kleiver Chauran; 15 Erick Lugo; 13 Aaron Pinero; -- Carlos Salazar; 8 Jean Santana; 22 Roosbert Tapia; Outfielders: 9 Eduardo Acevedo; -- Maykol Coret; 18 Emiliano Galan; 6 Carlos Matias; 7 John Santana	Manager: -- Albert Lantigua; Coaches: -- Edgar Alfonzo (assistant pitching); -- Eleardo Cabrera (infield); -- Omar Luna (hitting); 7-day injured list * On Tampa Bay Rays 40-man roster ~ Development list # Rehab assignment ∞ Reserve list ‡ Restricted list § Suspended list † Temporarily inactive list Roster updated February 28, 2024; Transactions → More rosters: MiLB • Dominican Summer League → Tampa Bay Rays minor league players
