= List of Tampa Bay Rays owners and executives =

This article is a historical list of owners and executives for Major League Baseball's Tampa Bay Rays.

== Owners ==
Name	Years
Vincent J. Naimoli – 15%, Bill Griffin, Dan Doyle Sr., Mark Bostick, Robert Basham, Chris Sullivan – 48%, Limited Partners – 37%	1998–2004
Stuart Sternberg – 48%, Vincent J. Naimoli (his estate after August 2019)– 15%, Limited Partners – 37%	2005–2025
Patrick Zalupski, Bill Cosgrove, Ken Babby	2026–present

== General Managers ==
Name	Seasons
Chuck LaMar	1998–2005
Andrew Friedman	2006–2014
Matthew Silverman	2015–2016
Erik Neander	2017–2021
Peter Bendix	2022–2023
Vacant	2024–present

== Other executives ==
- Brian Auld
- Rocco Baldelli
- Eddie Bane
- Cam Bonifay
- R. J. Harrison
- Gerry Hunsicker
- Fred McGriff
- Rick Williams
