= Kevin Kiermaier =

American baseball player (born 1990)

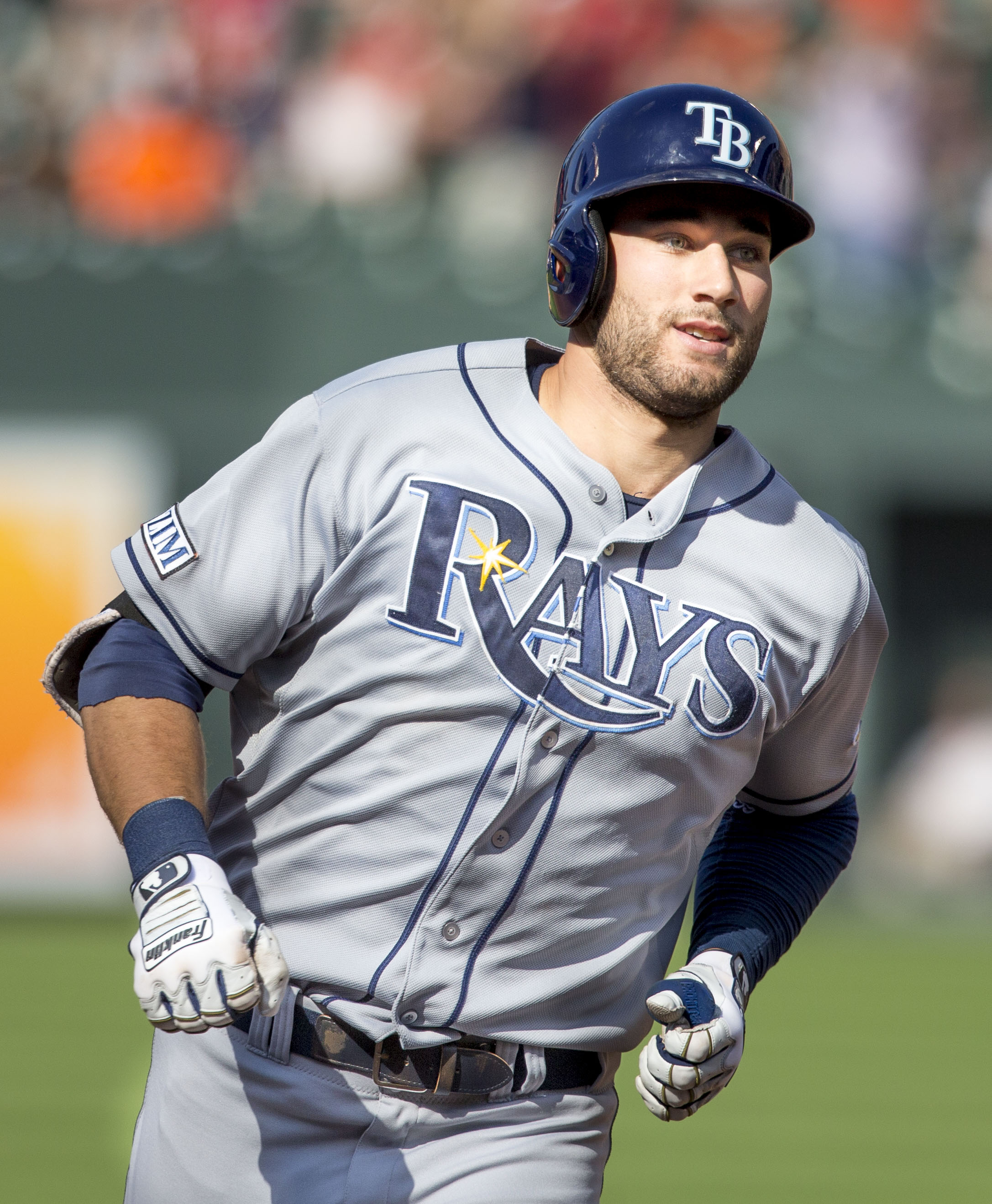
- Kiermaier with the Tampa Bay Rays in 2014
- Center fielder
- Born: April 22, 1990 (age 36); Fort Wayne, Indiana, U.S.
- Batted: Left Threw: Right

MLB debut
- September 30, 2013, for the Tampa Bay Rays

Last MLB appearance
- September 28, 2024, for the Los Angeles Dodgers

MLB statistics
- Batting average: .246
- Home runs: 95
- Runs batted in: 378
- Stats at Baseball Reference

Teams
- Tampa Bay Rays (2013–2022); Toronto Blue Jays (2023–2024); Los Angeles Dodgers (2024)

Career highlights and awards
- 4× Gold Glove Award (2015, 2016, 2019, 2023)

Kevin James Kiermaier (/ˈkɪərmaɪ.ər/; born April 22, 1990) is an American former professional baseball outfielder. He played in Major League Baseball (MLB) from 2013 to 2024 for the Tampa Bay Rays, Toronto Blue Jays, and Los Angeles Dodgers. Known for his strong defense, Kiermaier won the Gold Glove Award for center fielders in 2015, 2016, 2019 and 2023, and the Platinum Glove Award in 2015.

Kiermaier was part of amateur championship teams at both the high school and college levels. His high school won a state championship in Indiana, and his team earned a National Junior College Athletic Association (NJCAA) national championship at Parkland College, where he was twice named an NJCAA All-American. Kiermaier made his MLB debut on September 30, 2013 – also game 163 of the regular season, and a wild-card tiebreaker game. He played for the Rays through 2022, and concluded his career with stints on the Toronto Blue Jays and Los Angeles Dodgers.

== Playing career ==
=== Amateur career, draft, and minor leagues ===
Kiermaier attended Bishop Luers High School in Fort Wayne, Indiana, and played for the school's baseball team. Bishop Luers won the state championship in Kiermaier's senior year. After being recruited by college programs for their football teams and almost committing to attend Purdue University, Kiermaier opted to play college baseball and enrolled at Parkland College instead, where he competed in the National Junior College Athletic Association (NJCAA). As a freshman, Parkland won the NJCAA National Championship. Kiermaier was named a NJCAA All-American in his two years at Parkland.

The Tampa Bay Rays selected Kiermaier in the 31st round of the 2010 Major League Baseball (MLB) draft. Purdue again offered Kiermaier a scholarship, but he decided to sign with the Rays instead of transferring to Purdue. Kiermaier spent the 2013 season in Double–A and Triple–A, and was named the best defensive player in the Rays' organization and the Most Valuable Player of the Montgomery Biscuits of the Double–A Southern League. With Montgomery, he played 97 games, batting .307 with five home runs and 28 RBI. In Triple–A, he played 39 games with the Durham Bulls, batting .263 with a home run and 13 RBI.

=== Tampa Bay Rays ===
==== 2013 ====
Considering him the top defensive outfielder in their organization – including the major league club and all their minor league affiliates – the Tampa Bay Rays activated Kiermaier to both the 40- and 25-man rosters for the first time on September 30, 2013. He made his major league debut in that evening's wild card tie-breaker game – the Rays' 163rd game of the season – and played one inning against the Texas Rangers in the ninth as a defensive replacement. Rays general manager Andrew Friedman commented that the club included Kiermaier on the major league roster late that season specifically for his defense in center field. He played two innings in the 2013 American League Wild Card Game against the Cleveland Indians, which was his only postseason appearance that year. That winter, Baseball America rated him the tenth-best prospect in the Rays' minor league system.

==== 2014 ====
On May 18, 2014, Kiermaier hit his first major league home run against Mike Morin of the Los Angeles Angels of Anaheim. He finished 2014 hitting .263 with 10 home runs in 108 games and was one of the finalists for the Gold Glove Award for American League right fielders.

==== 2015 ====
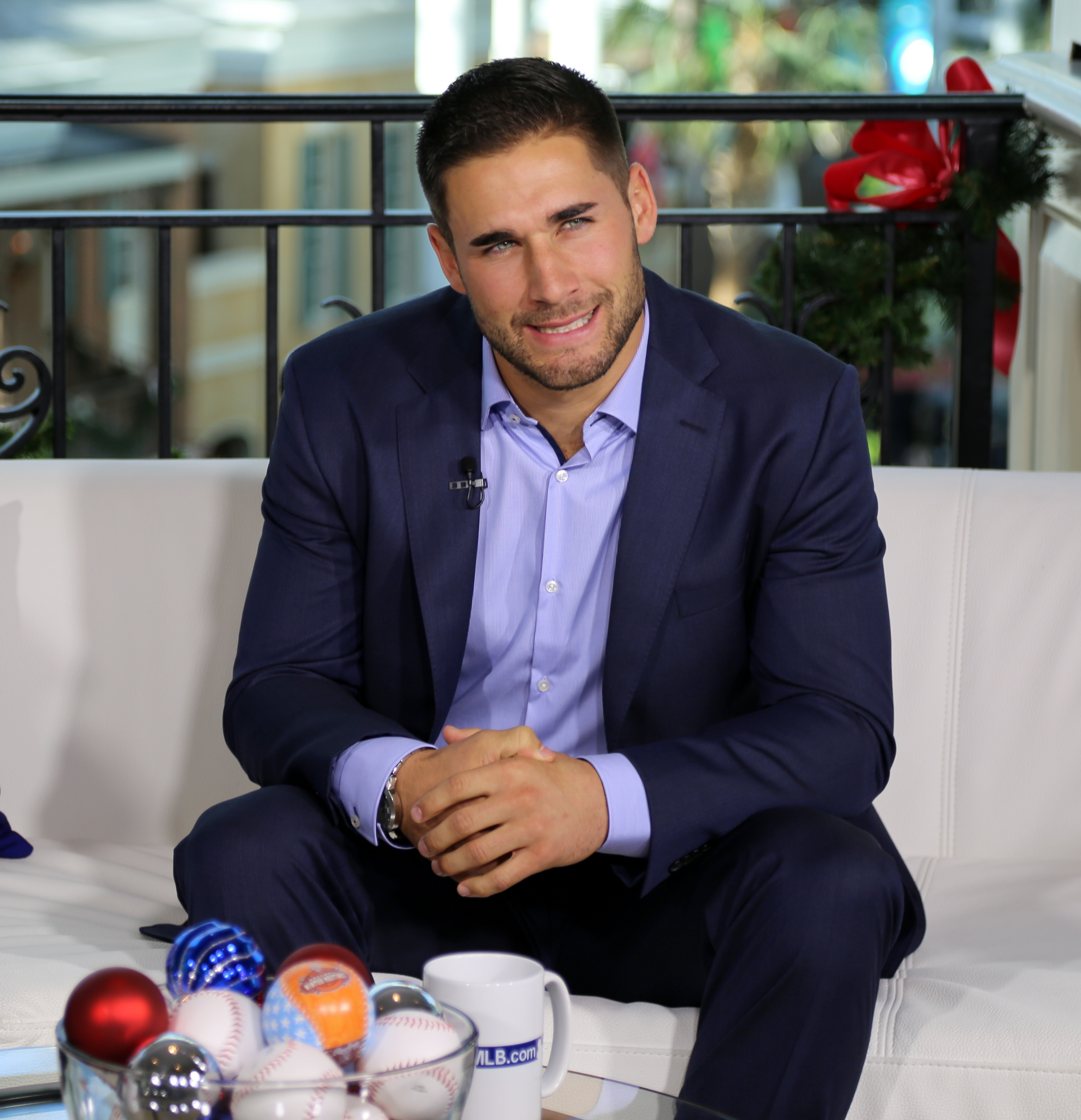
Kiermaier in 2015

In a game at Tropicana Field against the Kansas City Royals on August 29, 2015, Kiermaier was involved in a failed but humorous attempt to rob designated hitter Kendrys Morales of a home run. Morales hit a fly ball which appeared to be clearing the center field fence for a home run. Kiermaier leapt and momentarily perched himself upright on the top of the fence and waited to catch the ball before it landed. However, it dropped approximately 30 feet (9.1 m) in front of the fence, and Kiermaier watched it bounce as he continued to cling to the fence. The ball had deflected off one of the catwalks suspended from the roof, and, in accordance with park rules, the umpires awarded a home run to Morales.

One of 15 MLB outfielders to register a throw back into the infield at or above 100 miles per hour (160 km/h) in 2015, Kiermaier led all MLB outfielders by reaching 100 MPH nine times, while all others combined to reach that speed 27 times.

Kiermaier finished the 2015 season leading all major league fielders in Defensive Runs Saved (DRS) with 42, the highest number since the start of calculations of the statistic and batted .263 with 10 home runs and 40 RBI in 150 games. He garnered 4.4 defensive Wins Above Replacement (WAR), tied for seventh all-time according to Baseball-Reference.com. His overall 6.9 WAR ranked fifth in the American League. Kiermaier won his first each of the Fielding Bible Award for MLB center fielders, Gold Glove Award for American League center fielders, and the American League Platinum Glove Award, awarded to the best overall defensive player in each league.

==== 2016 ====
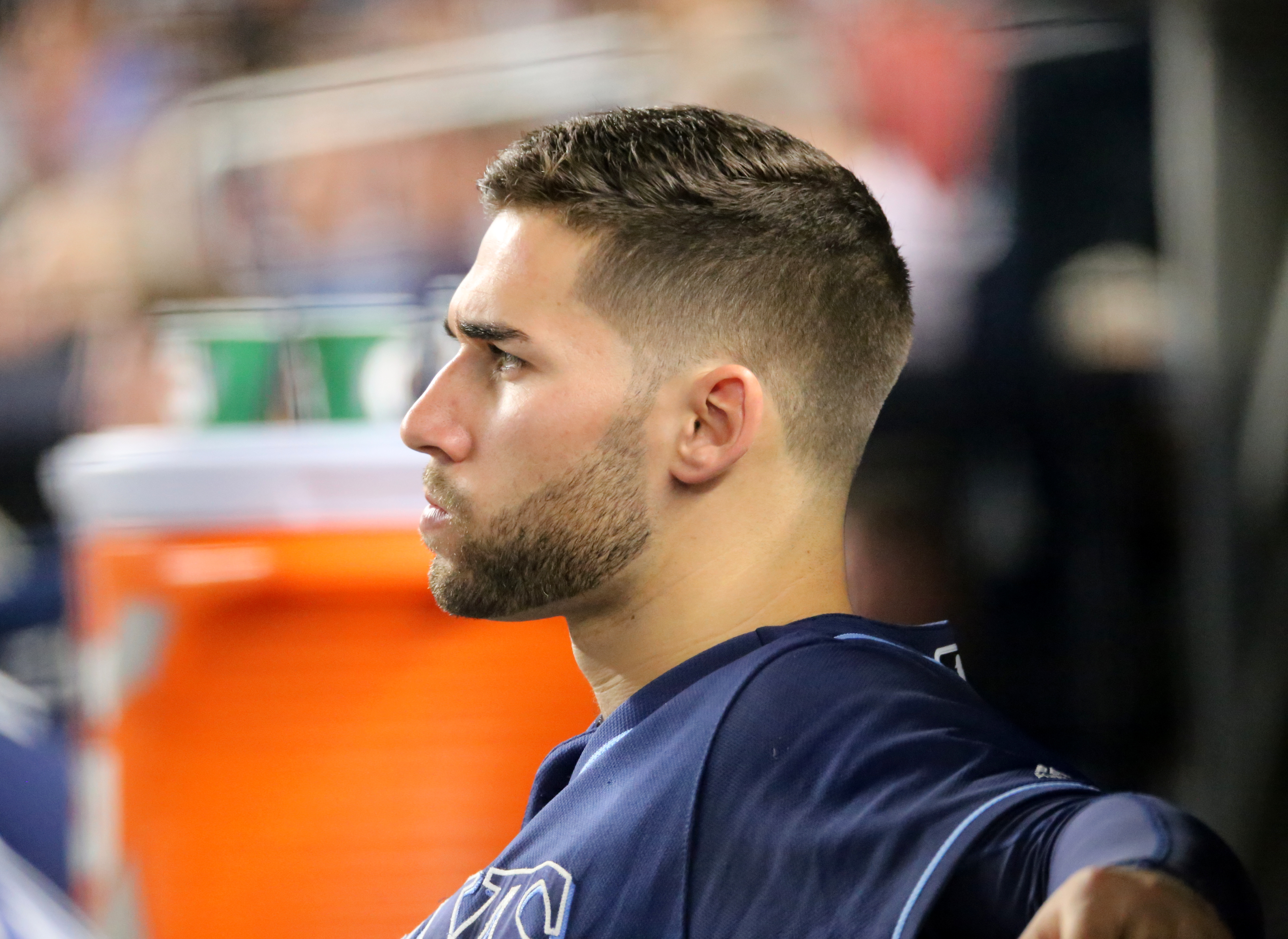
Kiermaier in 2016 with the Rays

Improving upon the previous season's results as a hitter, Kiermaier began the 2016 season by decreasing his strikeout rate, nearly doubling his walk rate, and increasing his power. In a 5–4 loss to the Detroit Tigers on May 21, he fractured two bones in his left hand while attempting to catch a sinking line drive off the bat of James McCann. After undergoing surgery to repair the fractures, he was medically cleared to resume limited workouts on May 27.

Despite missing significant time, Kiermaier was once again one of the best defenders in all of baseball, leading all center fielders with 25 Defensive Runs Saved (DRS) despite playing in almost 400 innings less than the next player on the list, Kevin Pillar. Kiermaier also paced all major leaguers with a 2.95 dWAR (defensive wins above replacement).

Kiermaier finished the season hitting .246 with 12 home runs in 105 games. He also stole 21 bases. He was awarded with his second Gold Glove Award.

==== 2017 ====
Prior to the 2017 season, Kiermaier signed a 6-year, $53.5 million extension with the Rays. On June 9, it was revealed that Kiermaier had suffered a hairline fracture in his right hip after sliding into first base in a previous game. He was ruled out for at least two months. On August 18, Kiermaier returned to the lineup, batting lead off in a game against the Seattle Mariners. After a second straight injury shortened season, Kiermaier was still able to produce in the top tier of defensive players. He came in second place in Defensive Runs Saved at center field with 22, a career low, and short only of the Minnesota Twins' Byron Buxton, who led with 24 Defensive Runs Saved, with Kiermaier having played in more than 300 fewer innings than did Buxton. Offensively, Kiermaier slashed .276/.338/.450 with 15 home runs and 16 stolen bases; all but the stolen bases were career highs, even though he played in a career low 98 regular season games. Kiermaier was not eligible for the Gold Glove Award because he did not reach the innings requirement for his team's first 138 games. This was the first time he was not named a finalist for the award.

==== 2018 ====
On April 15, Kiermaier injured his thumb on the right hand while sliding to second base and left the game. The next day, MRIs revealed that Kiermaier's right thumb had a torn ligament, ruling him out for up to 3 months. He returned on June 19 against the Houston Astros. Kiermaier finished the 2018 season playing only in 88 games, hitting .217 with 7 home runs and 29 RBIs. His nine triples was third in the American league. Kiermaier was named Wilson Defensive Player of the Year for centerfield despite his injuries.

==== 2019 ====
In 2019, he had the best jump of all major league outfielders (3.8 feet vs average). Once again, Kiermaier led center fielders in defensive runs saved with 13. He won his third Gold Glove Award, tying Evan Longoria for the most in franchise history. He became the third outfielder since 2011 to win three Gold Glove awards (Adam Jones, Ender Inciarte). In game 3 of the American League Division Series against the Houston Astros, Kiermaier hit a three-run home run.

==== 2020 ====
By the 2020 season, Kiermaier had become the longest tenured Ray and the only active player who had been managed by franchise legend Joe Maddon. On July 26, Kiermaier hit a walk-off triple against the Toronto Blue Jays. He finished the season batting .217 with 3 home runs and 8 stolen bases. According to FanGraphs, Kiermaier led all center fielders in UZR (7.7), UZR/150 (30.7), and assists (6), while being second in defensive runs saved (10) behind only Byron Buxton (11). The Rays finished the season with the best record in the American League. Before the start of the American League Division Series against the New York Yankees, Kiermaier commented on the rivalry by saying “They don’t like us, we don’t like them, and it’s going to continue to stay that way". This comment was in response to when Aroldis Chapman threw at the head of Mike Brosseau just six weeks prior. In game 3 of the ALDS against the Yankees, Kiermaier hit a go-ahead three-run home run, as the Rays went on to win both the game and the series. In the American League Championship Series against the Houston Astros, Kiermaier got hit in the hand by a pitch and was unable to start in games 4, 5, and 6. He did, however, return for game 7 as the Rays defeated the Astros and advanced to the World Series. In the 2020 World Series against the Los Angeles Dodgers, Kiermaier hit a home run against Clayton Kershaw, although the Dodgers prevailed as baseball champions.

==== 2021 ====
In 2021, Kiermaier batted .259/.328/.388 with four home runs, 37 RBIs, 54 runs scored and nine stolen bases in 122 games. Following the season, in November 2021, Kiermaier underwent arthroscopic knee surgery.

==== 2022 ====
On April 23, 2022, a day after his 32nd birthday, Kiermaier hit his first career walk-off home run, in the 10th inning of a game against the Red Sox, to win 3–2. Rays manager Kevin Cash stated on July 25 that Kiermaier would undergo surgery for a hip injury dating back to July 9, and miss the remainder of the season. On November 10, the Rays declined Kiermaier's $13 million club option for 2023, making him a free agent.

=== Toronto Blue Jays ===
==== 2023 ====
On December 14, 2022, Kiermaier signed a one-year, $9 million contract with the Toronto Blue Jays. In 129 games for Toronto in 2023, he batted .265/.322/.419 with 8 home runs, 36 RBI, and 14 stolen bases. On November 5, 2023, Kiermaier won his 4th career Gold Glove Award, edging out the other two American League center field nominees, Julio Rodriguez of the Seattle Mariners and Luis Robert Jr. of the Chicago White Sox. Kiermaier's contract expired at the conclusion of the 2023 season, making him a free agent.

==== 2024 ====
On December 28, 2023, Kiermaier re-signed with the Blue Jays on a one-year contract worth $10.5 million. On July 24, 2024, Kiermaier announced that he would be retiring following the 2024 season. In 81 games for Toronto, he batted .195/.236/.310 with four home runs, 18 RBI, and five stolen bases.

=== Los Angeles Dodgers ===
On July 30, 2024, the Blue Jays traded Kiermaier to the Los Angeles Dodgers in exchange for Ryan Yarbrough. In 34 games for the Dodgers, he batted .203 with one home run, eight RBI, and one stolen base. Kiermaier appeared in four games in the 2024 NLCS, primarily as a late game defensive replacement, though he did have two at-bats. He was left off the 2024 World Series roster; however, the Dodgers would go on to win the World Series, earning Kiermaier his only championship. He announced in July that 2024 would be his last MLB season.

== Post-playing career ==
On February 8, 2025, Kiermaier was hired to join the Toronto Blue Jays' front office as a special assistant.

== Personal life ==
Kiermaier proposed to girlfriend Marisa Moralobo on February 11, 2017. They married on November 10, 2017, in St. Petersburg, Florida. Their first child, a son, was born in November 2018.

Kiermaier's older brother, Dan, is the head groundskeeper for the Chicago Cubs.
