= Beazer Homes USA =

American homebuilding company

Beazer Homes USA, Inc.
- Type: Public company
- Traded as: NYSE: BZH; Russell 2000 Component
- Industry: Home construction
- Headquarters: Atlanta, Georgia
- Key people: Stephen P. Zelnak, Chairman; Allan P. Merrill, President & CEO; Robert L. Salomon, CFO
- Production output: 5,419 deliveries
- Revenue: ▲$1.822 billion (2016)
- Operating income: ▲$0.059 billion (2016)
- Total assets: ▼$2.213 billion (2016)
- Total equity: ▲$0.643 billion (2016)
- Number of employees: 1,100 (2016)
- Website: www.beazer.com

Beazer Homes USA, Inc. is a home construction company based in Atlanta, Georgia. In 2016, the company was the 11th largest home builder in the United States based on the number of homes closed. The company operates in 13 states.

As of December 31, 2016, the company had 161 active communities. The company was purchased on October 20, 2026 by Patrick Zalupski's Dream Finders Homes, Inc. for an enterprise value of approximately $2.2 billion.

== History ==
Beazer Homes USA was established in 1985 when Beazer, a British home construction company led by Brian Beazer, acquired Cohn Communities, an Atlanta-based home construction company. In 1986, the company acquired Gifford-Hill, a construction materials company. In 1988, it acquired Koppers in a hostile takeover.

In 1991, the British parent company was acquired by Hanson.

In 1994, the company became a public company via an initial public offering.

In 1997, the company acquired the assets of Calton Homes of Florida for $16.7 million.

In 2002, the company acquired Crossman Communities for $489.7 million in cash and stock.

In 2004, the company acquired and started development on 242 home sites on Polk County, Florida.

In 2006, the company acquired 86 townhome sites in Seminole County, Florida.

In March 2007, the company received a grand jury subpoena from the U.S. Attorney's Office in the United States District Court for the Western District of North Carolina seeking documents related to its mortgage loan origination services. The investigation followed articles in The Charlotte Observer which noted that the company's aggressive sales tactics led to an unusually high foreclosure rate in its developments.

In July 2007, the company was investigated by the U.S. Securities and Exchange Commission after Chief Accounting Officer Michael T. Rand was fired for violating ethics policies by attempting to destroy documents related to the company's mortgage origination services. In 2014, Rand was found guilty of conspiracy and obstruction of justice charges.

On October 30, 2007, the company agreed to pay $261,000 as part of a $1.4 million settlement by 6 home construction companies to resolve allegations by the U.S. Department of Housing and Urban Development that title insurance companies paid kickbacks to the builders in exchange for referrals. The companies denied wrongdoing and said that they settled to avoid legal expenses.

On July 1, 2009, the company reached a $50 million settlement with several government agencies and admitted to fraudulent mortgage practices including retaining mortgage points that should have been used to lower interest rates charged, misinforming buyers that they were receiving down payment help when instead the price of the home was increased, circumventing HUD watch list programs, and ignoring borrower incomes when originating loans.

In 2018, Beazer Homes announced it has entered into an agreement to acquire Venture Homes, a leading private homebuilder in Atlanta, for approximately $65 million. The transaction also includes substantial construction work in process as well as 51 homes in backlog.
