= Patrick Zalupski =

American businessman (born 1980)

- Born: Patrick Odonaghue Zalupski; November 29, 1980 (age 45); Detroit, Michigan, U.S.
- Education: Stetson University
- Occupation: Real estate developer
- Title: President and CEO, Dream Finders Homes
- Term: 2008-present
- Board member of: University of Florida Board of Trustees

Patrick Zalupski (born 29 November 1980) is an American real estate developer. He is the founder and chief executive officer of Dream Finders Homes. He is also the principal shareholder of the ownership group of the Tampa Bay Rays of Major League Baseball and the team's managing partner.

== Career ==
Zalupski was born in suburban Detroit. He lived in Belgium when he attended high school as his father worked there for General Electric. Zalupski graduated from Stetson University with a degree in finance. After working for FedEx conducting internal audits, he moved to Jacksonville, where his mother worked as a real estate agent, and he became involved in the business. He began flipping houses in 2004.

Zalupski co-founded Dream Finders Homes in 2008. He bought out his co-founder in 2013. The company went public in 2021. In 2023, Florida governor Ron DeSantis appointed Zalupski to the board of trustees for the University of Florida.

In 2025, Zalupski led a group of investors that entered into negotiations to purchase the Tampa Bay Rays of Major League Baseball (MLB). Other investors include Ken Babbey, who owns two Minor League Baseball teams, and Bill Cosgrove, the CEO of Union Home Mortgage. The deal is reportedly for $1.7 billion. MLB owners approved the sale in September 2025. Zalupski intends to keep the team in the Tampa area. On October 20, 2026, Patrick Zalupski's Dream Finders Homes, Inc. completed its acquisition of Beazer Homes USA at a total enterprise value of approximately $2.2 billion.
