= Chuck LaMar =

American executive in Major League Baseball

- General manager
- Born: July 22, 1956 (age 70); Twin Falls, Idaho

Teams
- Tampa Bay Devil Rays (1998–2005)

Charles G. LaMar Jr. (born July 22, 1956) is an American professional baseball scout, former college baseball head coach, and former general manager in Major League Baseball (MLB). LaMar was the first general manager of the Tampa Bay Devil Rays, hired approximately three years before they began play in the American League in 1998.

== Biography ==
LaMar was born in Twin Falls, Idaho and grew up in Houston, Texas, where his father, Charles LaMar Sr., was an office manager at Alloys of Texas. The younger LaMar attended Madison High School where he was a three-sport captain. He played college baseball at Texas Christian University. After his senior year, LaMar taught and coached at St. Thomas High School in Houston.

Larry Smith, former head coach at Texas Wesleyan University, tabbed LaMar to be his assistant coach when Smith took the head coaching job at Indiana University in the Big Ten Conference. LaMar earned his master's degree in physical education from Indiana, then went on to become the head coach at the University of Mary Hardin-Baylor.

=== Major League Baseball ===
In 1985, Lamar left to become a full-time scout with the Cincinnati Reds. LaMar signed the first working agreement between a Mexico and America professional baseball team. From the Reds, LaMar became the director of minor league operations with the Pittsburgh Pirates, holding the position during 1989–1990. From 1990 to 1992, the Pirates won three National League East Division titles.

In 1991, LaMar moved to the Atlanta Braves and served as director of player development and scouting (through 1993), with the team winning its division in both seasons. He then served as assistant general manager and director of player personnel (1994–1995), working with general manager John Schuerholz during one of the most successful periods in Braves' history, as the club won the 1995 World Series.

==== Tampa Bay Devil Rays ====
LaMar was hired to be the first general manager of the then-Tampa Bay Devil Rays on July 19, 1995, several months after the Tampa Bay franchise was awarded. During the eight seasons (1998–2005) when LaMar oversaw the Devil Rays franchise, the expansion team compiled a 518–777 (.400) record and only once won more than 70 games, in 2004.

LaMar's tenure was characterized by moves such as trading Bobby Abreu and Dmitri Young while receiving Kevin Stocker and Mike Kelly in return. Those trades proved to be failures as Abreu and Young went on to have successful careers. LaMar was also responsible for signing Juan Guzmán, Wilson Álvarez, Wade Boggs, Roberto Hernández, and trading for Fred McGriff. LaMar was fired on October 6, 2005, by incoming owner Stuart Sternberg.

==== Later career ====
Lamar spent the 2007 season with the Washington Nationals as special assistant to the general manager and national crosschecker.

In October 2007, LaMar was appointed director of professional scouting by the Philadelphia Phillies, later promoted to assistant general manager of player development and scouting in November 2008. On September 6, 2011, Lamar resigned from the Phillies.

On November 4, 2011, it was announced that LaMar would be joining the Toronto Blue Jays as a special assistant for amateur scouting.

=== Personal life ===
LaMar resides in Rockport, Texas, and is married with a son and two daughters. He has stated that his hero is Ted Williams. LaMar was inducted to the Texas Scout Association's hall of fame in 2017.

LaMar's brother Dan was selected in the first round of the 1979 MLB draft by the Cincinnati Reds; Dan Lamar went on to play in Minor League Baseball from 1979 through 1985 as a catcher and first baseman.

Sporting positions
Preceded by Franchise established	Tampa Bay Devil Rays General manager 1998–2005	Succeeded by Andrew Friedman
