= Tampa Bay Rays =

Major League Baseball franchise

- 2026 Tampa Bay Rays season

Logo	Cap insignia
- Established in 1998

Major league affiliations
- American League (1998–present); East Division (1998–present)

Current uniform
- Retired numbers: 3; 12; 66; 42

Colors
- Navy blue, light blue, yellow, white

Name
- Tampa Bay Rays (2008–present); Tampa Bay Devil Rays (1998–2007)

Ballpark
- Tropicana Field (1998–2024, 2026–present); George M. Steinbrenner Field (2025) (Note: Due to damage to Tropicana Field caused by Hurricane Milton, the Rays played all of their home games for the 2025 Major League Baseball season at George M. Steinbrenner Field.)

Major league titles
- World Series titles (0): None
- AL pennants (3): 2008; 2020; 2026
- AL East division titles (5): 2008; 2010; 2020; 2021; 2026
- Wild card berths (5): 2011; 2013; 2019; 2022; 2023

Front office
- Principal owner: Patrick Zalupski
- President: Ken Babby (CEO of Business Operations)
- President of baseball operations: Erik Neander
- General manager: Vacant
- Manager: Kevin Cash
- Website: mlb.com/rays

The Tampa Bay Rays are an American professional baseball team based in the Tampa Bay area. The Rays compete in Major League Baseball (MLB) as a member club of the American League (AL) East Division. They are one of two major league clubs based in Florida, alongside the National League (NL)'s Miami Marlins. The team plays its home games at Tropicana Field in St. Petersburg, Florida.

Following nearly three decades of unsuccessfully trying to gain an expansion franchise or enticing existing teams to relocate to the Tampa Bay area, an ownership group led by Vince Naimoli was approved on March 9, 1995. The team began play as the Tampa Bay Devil Rays in the 1998 Major League Baseball season.

The team's first decade of play was marked by futility; they finished in last place in the AL East in all but the 2004 season, when they finished second to last. Following the 2007 season, Stuart Sternberg, who had purchased controlling interest in the team from Naimoli two years earlier, changed the team's name from "Devil Rays" to "Rays", now meaning both manta rays and rays of sunshine; a manta ray logo appears on the uniform sleeves while a sunburst appears on the uniform front. The 2008 season saw the Rays post their first winning season, their first AL East championship, and their first American League pennant (defeating the rival Boston Red Sox in the ALCS), though they lost to the Philadelphia Phillies in that year's World Series. Since then, the Rays have been much more successful, becoming AL East champions four more times and clinching the American League's wild card five more times, leading to another American League pennant again in 2020 before losing to the Los Angeles Dodgers in that year's World Series. They reached the World Series again in 2026, but once again lost to the Milwaukee Brewers. The Rays are one of four MLB teams to not have a World Series title yet, the others being the San Diego Padres, Colorado Rockies, and Seattle Mariners, and are currently the team with the most World Series appearances without a series win with three appearances.

The Tampa Bay Rays' chief rivals are the Boston Red Sox and the New York Yankees, which also play in the AL East. Regarding the former, there have been several notable on-field incidents. The Rays also have an in-state interleague rivalry with the Miami Marlins (originally the Florida Marlins).

Through 2026, the Rays' all-time record is 2,266–2,328 (.493).

== History ==
=== Background and push for an expansion team ===
The Tampa Bay area has a long association with amateur and professional baseball. Tampa and St. Petersburg were among the first hosts of Major League Baseball spring training in the 1910s, the Tampa Smokers and St. Petersburg Saints were two of the founding members of the minor league Florida State League (FSL) in 1919, and several other communities in the area also hosted FSL teams in the following years. However, it was not until a period of explosive population and economic growth after World War II that the area was considered as a possible location for major professional sports.

The push to bring major league baseball to the Tampa Bay area can be traced to the late 1960s, when civic leader and St. Petersburg Times publisher Jack Lake wrote a series of editorials arguing that St. Petersburg could and should support a franchise. However, though Tampa was awarded the expansion Tampa Bay Buccaneers by the National Football League in 1974, the region suffered through many unsuccessful attempts to acquire a major league baseball team through expansion or relocation in the 1970s to the early 1990s. The Oakland Athletics, Minnesota Twins, Chicago White Sox, Texas Rangers, Kansas City Royals, San Francisco Giants, and Seattle Mariners all seriously considered moving to either Tampa or St. Petersburg, but they all remained in place, usually with the enticement of a new publicly funded ballpark. In response, the city of St. Petersburg decided to build the Florida Suncoast Dome (now called Tropicana Field) in the mid-1980s for the express purpose of luring a major league team with a move-in ready facility. The building opened in 1990, but it would be several more years before the area gained a major league franchise.

When MLB announced plans to add two expansion teams for the 1993 season, it was widely assumed that one would be placed in the Tampa Bay area, most likely St. Petersburg. However, the region's effort was split into two ownership groups with competing applications: the "Tampa Bay Whitecaps" group led by Roy Disney and the Kohl department store family that proposed hosting the franchise at the Florida Suncoast Dome in St. Petersburg, and the "Florida Panthers" group led by former Texas Rangers part-owner Frank Morsani that planned on building a new ballpark adjacent to Tampa Stadium, home of the Buccaneers. The league declined to award a franchise to either group, and instead placed franchises in Denver (Colorado Rockies) and Miami (Florida Marlins). Morsani sued MLB, claiming he had been promised an expansion team in exchange for dropping his plans to relocate the Twins or Rangers to Tampa. Ultimately, he sold the "Panthers" trademark to Marlins owner Wayne Huizenga, who would later use it for his Miami-based professional hockey team.

Tampa-based investor Vince Naimoli had negotiated a deal to buy the San Francisco Giants and move them to St. Petersburg in 1992, but MLB owners unexpectedly voted to block the deal. Naimoli sued Major League Baseball for tortious interference for intervening, and in part to settle the suit, MLB awarded his ownership group a new expansion franchise on March 9, 1995, the same day that the Arizona Diamondbacks were awarded to Phoenix. The new franchise would take to the artificial turf of St. Petersburg's newly rechristened Tropicana Field during the 1998 season.

Naimoli initially planned to call the team the "Tampa Bay Sting Rays" but the naming rights were already held by the minor league Maui Stingrays. The Maui club offered to sell the name for $35,000, but rather than make the deal, Naimoli opted for a different species of rays, and the new franchise was introduced as the Tampa Bay Devil Rays. The name was not welcomed in all quarters; the devil ray is not nearly as common in waters near Tampa Bay as the ubiquitous cownose stingray, and several pastors of local Christian churches told the Tampa Bay Times that the inclusion of the word "devil" offended them. However, fans approved the name in a telephone poll set up by Naimoli, who had offered to change the name to the "Manta Rays" if the public chose the alternative.

The Tampa Bay Devil Rays named Chuck LaMar, the former assistant general manager of the Atlanta Braves, as its first general manager; Larry Rothschild, a former pitching coach for the Marlins and Cincinnati Reds, was named the team's first manager on November 7, 1997. In the Expansion Draft on November 18, 1997, the Devil Rays acquired their first player in pitcher Tony Saunders. Among the team's 34 other draft picks was future star outfielder Bobby Abreu; however, Abreu was soon dealt to the Philadelphia Phillies for utility infielder Kevin Stocker in a trade generally regarded among the worst in recent MLB history. The team acquired several veteran stars in trades or free agent signings before their first season including pitcher Wilson Alvarez and two Tampa natives in first baseman Fred McGriff and third baseman Wade Boggs, both future members of the Baseball Hall of Fame.

=== 1998–2005: The Devil Rays and early struggles ===
The Devil Rays played their first game on March 31, 1998, against the Detroit Tigers at Tropicana Field, before an opening day crowd of 45,369. Wilson Álvarez threw the first pitch and Wade Boggs hit the team's first home run, though the Devil Rays ended up losing 11–6. The next day, the Devil Rays won their first victory, defeating Detroit 11–8, thanks to rookie pitcher (and future All-Star) Rolando Arrojo. Despite briefly being over .500 in their first 19 games (a first for an expansion team in their inaugural season), the team would go on to lose 99 that year, ending with the second-worst record in the league (just above their neighbors, the Marlins, who lost 108).

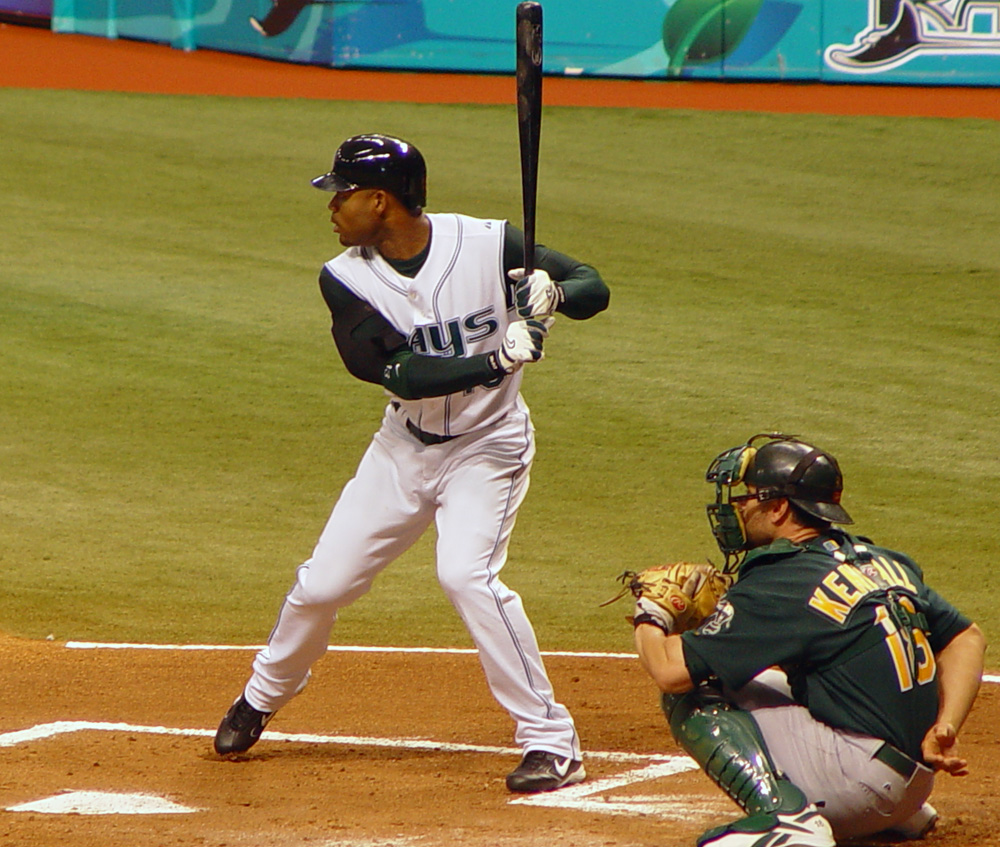
Carl Crawford was one of the Rays' first breakout stars

The Devil Rays continued to struggle in their next few seasons, with many of their veteran players, including the "Hit Show" of sluggers (McGriff, Vinny Castilla, Jose Canseco and Greg Vaughn), being past their prime—though Wade Boggs would mark his 3000th career hit, a home run, against the Cleveland Indians on August 7, 1999. Having led the Devil Rays through two last-place, 69-wins seasons in 1999 and 2000, Rothschild was fired partway through the 2001 season and replaced by Hal McRae. Despite the change, the team continued to decline, and the 2002 season would lead to a franchise-worst 55–106 record, despite the emergence of key players like Aubrey Huff, Toby Hall, and Carl Crawford. McRae was moved to a front office position after the season.

Lou Piniella, a Tampa native who had previously led the Reds to a World Series, replaced McRae as manager for the 2003 season, winning 63 games. The next year, Piniella's Devil Rays finished with a 70–91 record, just above the Toronto Blue Jays to claim in 4th in the American League East—the first time in franchise history the team was out of last place. Despite this, the Devil Rays still had very little fan support due to Naimoli's frugal approach to running the team, something the team still struggles with today. Carl Crawford established himself as a breakout star, leading the American League in triples (19) and, for the second year in a row, stolen bases (59). In the 2005 season, Crawford's production at the plate was matched by newcomers Jorge Cantú and Jonny Gomes, though the team was let down by its pitching staff (despite the arrival of Scott Kazmir) and finished 67–95.

Tensions between the owners and Piniella came to a head after the dismal 2005 season. Piniella became frustrated with the ownership group's lack of commitment to the team, stating that they were "not interested about the present" but "about the future." He took issue not only with Naimoli (whose repeated promises of payroll increases had not been met), but with a new group of investors led by Stuart Sternberg. After the 2005 season, Sternberg purchased controlling interest in the team and released Piniella, buying out the last year of his contract for $2.2 million.

=== 2006–2015: The Rays, Joe Maddon, and first postseason appearances ===
For the 2006 season, Sternberg hired Joe Maddon, formerly of the Anaheim Angels, to replace Piniella as manager. Sternberg also fired LaMar and most of the front office, replacing him with Andrew Friedman (as Executive Vice President of Baseball Operations). Nevertheless, the team continued to struggle for the first two years of Maddon's tenure, finishing 61–101 and 66–96 in 2006 and 2007 season.

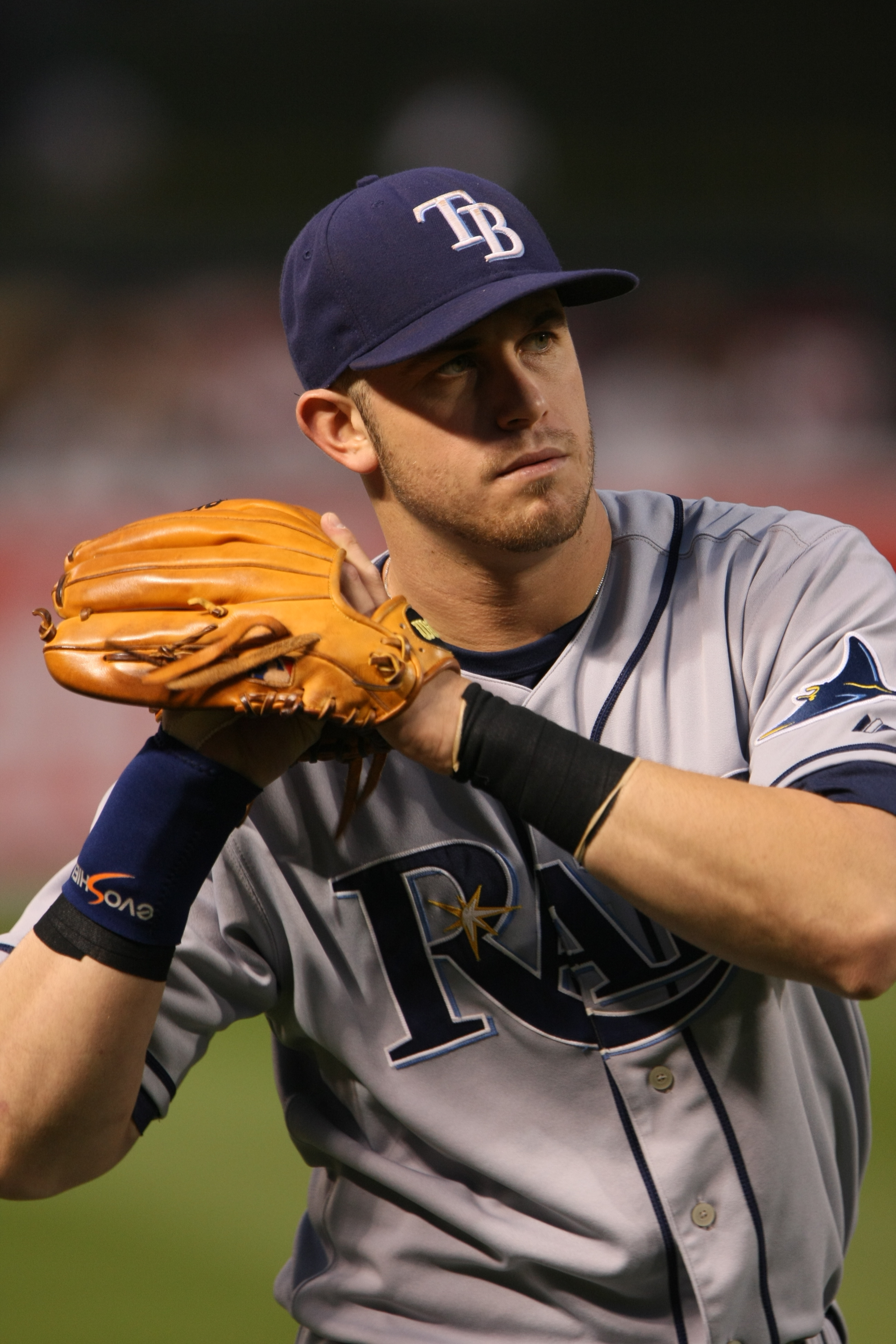
Evan Longoria owns many Rays franchise records, including games played, home runs, RBIs, and WAR.

The team was rebranded before the 2008 season, abandoning its nickname and green-white color scheme for a new existence as the Tampa Bay Rays. Dropping the "Devil", the new Rays name referred to a ray of sunshine (for the Sunshine State of Florida), and the team adopted a navy, Columbia blue and gold color scheme. Sternberg finally delivered on his promises to increase the team's payroll, raising it to $43 million (still the lowest payroll in baseball). The team, anchored by Crawford, Kazmir, and pitcher James Shields, was bolstered by new additions of pitchers Matt Garza and David Price (a first round draft pick), outfielder Ben Zobrist, and third base prospect Evan Longoria. The Rays started the season strongly with their best record in franchise history, and became the first team in modern Major League history (since 1900) to hold the best record in the league through Memorial Day, after having the worst record in the league the year before. The Rays briefly fell behind the Boston Red Sox but, with the best home record in Major League Baseball, managed to qualify for at least the AL Wild Card on September 20—the team's first-ever postseason berth. The Rays would ultimately end the season two games above the Red Sox in the AL East, their first divisional title.

The 2008 American League Division Series was the Rays' first playoff series victory, defeating the Chicago White Sox in 4 games. Besting the Red Sox in the American League Championship Series in 7 games, the Rays advanced to the World Series for the first time. However, the team's good fortunes came to an end, and they were defeated four games to one by the Philadelphia Phillies.

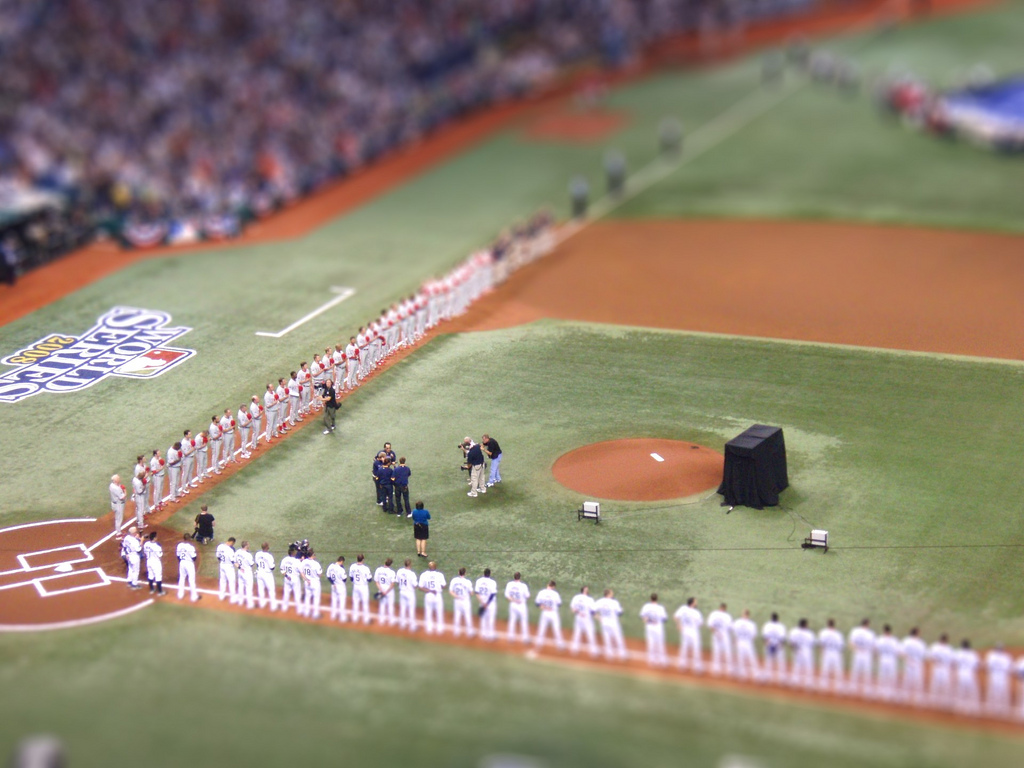
Tampa Bay in the 2008 World Series

Going into the 2009 season, the American League champions again posted a winning record, 84–78, but were unable to return to the postseason, in part due to injuries to Longoria, Akinori Iwamura and Carlos Peña. The Rays performed much better the following year, a season that saw Matt Garza throw the franchise's first no-hitter (against Detroit) They again won the AL East, finishing with the best record in the AL, but were eliminated in the ALDS by the Rangers.

The Rays lost veterans like Garza, Peña, and Crawford in the 2010–11 offseason, but nevertheless finished the 2011 season with the AL wild card, having just barely beat out the Red Sox with a 12th-inning walk-off home run by Evan Longoria against the Yankees. The team was again eliminated by the Rangers in the ALDS. The Rays missed out on the postseason the next year despite a 90–72 record, though David Price became the first Rays pitcher to earn the Cy Young Award. The team returned to the postseason in 2013 (after a Game 163 tiebreaker against Texas), in part thanks to new additions Wil Myers and Chris Archer. However, they were again defeated in the ALDS, this time by the eventual World Series champions, the Red Sox.

After 2013's failed championship bid, the Rays entered a period of decline; 2014 saw their first losing record (77–85) since 2007. Price was traded away to the Detroit Tigers, though the Rays received prospect Willy Adames in return. GM Andrew Friedman left Tampa Bay for a front office role with the Los Angeles Dodgers; this activated an opt-out clause in Maddon's contract, who also opted to leave Tampa Bay despite efforts to re-sign him. Maddon finished his tenure with a record of 754 wins and 705 losses.

=== 2015–present: The Kevin Cash era ===
The Rays named Kevin Cash as Maddon's successor on December 5, 2014; he would be the youngest manager in the league. Cash's first season in 2015 saw strong performances from Chris Archer, who became a Cy Young contender, and center-fielder Kevin Kiermaier, who won his first Gold Glove Award; however the team ended the season with an 80–82 record. The team fared more poorly in the next year; they finished last in the AL East for the first time since 2007, winning only 68 games in a season marred by injuries (including to Kiermaier) and a 3–24 stretch between June 16 and July 16. 2017 again saw strong performances from Archer and Alex Cobb (returning from Tommy John surgery the year before), and the team rebounded to match its 2015 record.

The 2017 season also saw Erik Neander take over as general manager from Matthew Silverman, and he would continue the Rays' strategy of aggressive trade moves. Heading into 2018, the Rays traded Evan Longoria, long considered a franchise player, to the Giants, and starter Jake Odorizzi to the Twins. More trades would come as the season went on, as Matt Andriese was dealt to Arizona; Archer was traded to the Pittsburgh Pirates for pitcher Tyler Glasnow, outfielder Austin Meadows, and prospect Shane Baz. Despite the departure of much of their existing rotation, Glasnow and Blake Snell anchored the team's pitching staff; Snell, who led all AL pitchers in wins (21) and ERA (1.89), won the franchise's second Cy Young Award. The team also pioneered the concept of the "opener," by which the pitcher who begins the game only pitches an inning or two before being relieved by the "bulk man" who often pitches into the late innings. Though criticized by some baseball traditionalists, the innovative strategy helped the Rays finish the year with the second-best team ERA in the American League. Though the Rays won 90 games in 2018, they did not qualify for the playoffs.

==== Snell, Lowe, and the second AL Pennant (2019–2021) ====
Cash led the Rays to his first postseason in 2019, building off an impressive 19–9 start to win 96 games. The pitching staff, anchored by starters Glasnow, Snell, and veteran Charlie Morton, led the American League with a 3.65 ERA. They defeated Oakland in the 2019 AL Wild Card Game, but they were defeated by the Houston Astros in a five-game ALDS.

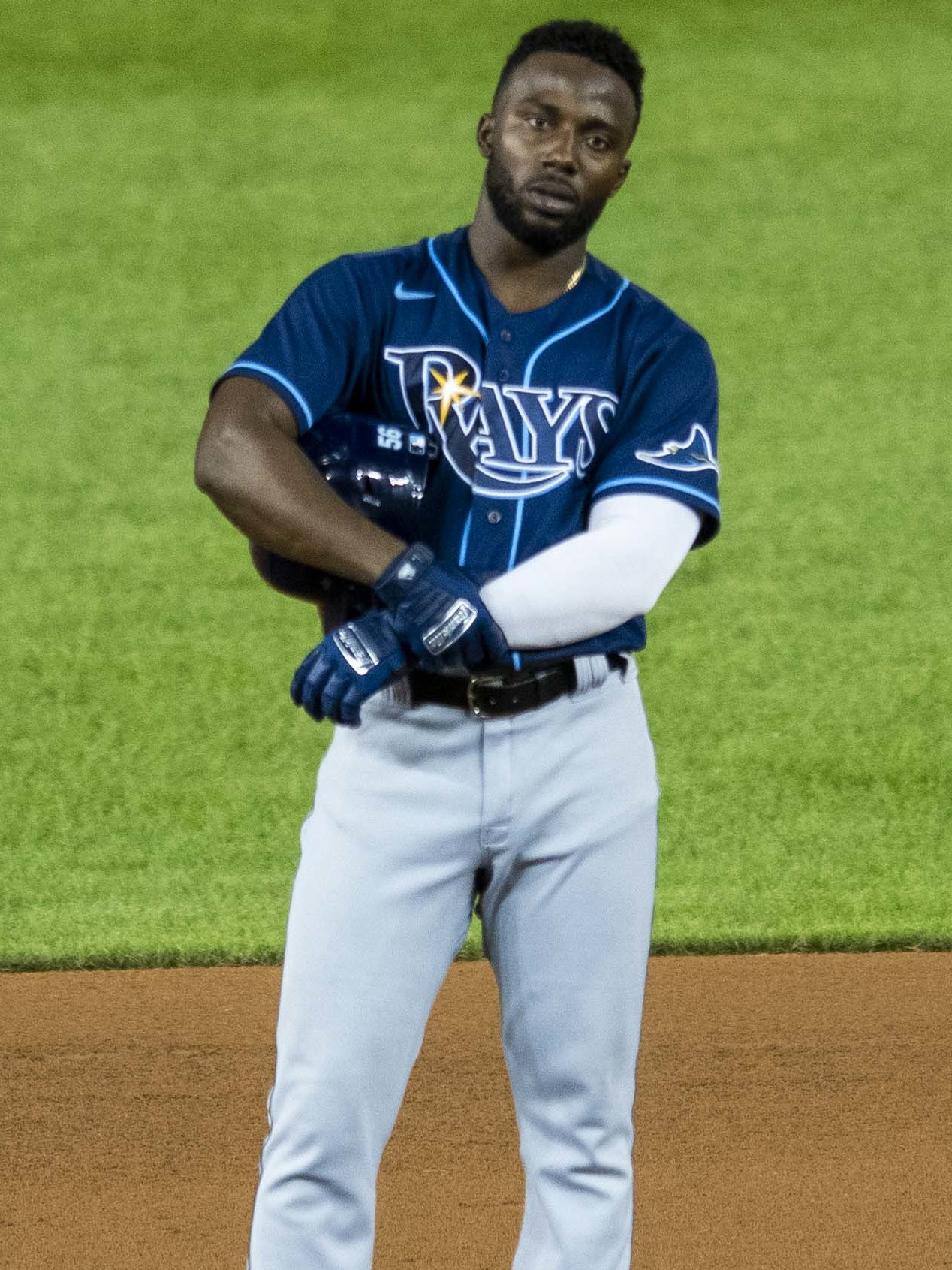
Randy Arozarena in 2020 set all-time records for most hits and home runs in a single postseason

Despite the postseason defeat, the Rays retained much of their core going into the 2020 season, which had been shortened to 60 games as a result of the COVID-19 pandemic. Despite a 5–7 start, the Rays rebounded to win 35 of their last 48 games, thanks to the rotation, the bullpen, and an offensive breakout from Brandon Lowe. At the end of the regular season, the team posted an AL-best 40–20 record, winning its first divisional title since 2011 and again advancing to the postseason.

The Rays went on to defeat the Yankees in the five-game ALDS, thanks to Mike Brosseau's go-ahead eighth inning home run off Yankees pitcher Aroldis Chapman; during the regular season, Chapman had instigated a bench-clearing altercation by throwing over Brosseau's head. The postseason was dominated by Randy Arozarena, who set new records for postseason home runs (10), hits by a rookie and by any player in a single postseason (29), and total bases (64). In a rematch of 2019, the Rays defeated the Astros in the seven-game ALCS, and went on to meet the Dodgers in the World Series. The Rays won Game 4 of the series in near-miraculous fashion; down 6–7, with two outs in the bottom of the ninth and down in the count 1–2, Brett Phillips singled off LA closer Kenley Jansen for his first career postseason hit, scoring Kiermaier to tie the game, and Arozarena to score the winning run and tie the series at two. Despite the heroics, the Rays lost the next two games to the Dodgers and were defeated in their second bid for a World Series.

In the offseason, the Rays unloaded much of their pitching core; Morton was lost to free agency and Snell was traded to the San Diego Padres. The roster would change even more after opening day; Willy Adames was traded to the Milwaukee Brewers and Glasnow underwent Tommy John surgery that would place him on the injured list through 2022. Nevertheless, the team welcomed many rookies, including starting pitcher Shane McClanahan, who had debuted in the 2020 postseason. The Rays finished the season with a record of 100–62, which was the best record in the American League and the third-best record in baseball. They won the AL East for the second consecutive year and were matched against the Wild Card Game winner in Boston. They beat the Red Sox in Game 1, punctuated by a steal of home plate by Arozarena. However, the team were eliminated by Boston in the ALDS after Boston won the next three games, which included the last two ending in walk-off fashion with a 13th inning home run in Game 3 and a series-ending walk-off sacrifice fly in Game 4.

==== Wild card berths and the long road back to the World Series (2021–present) ====
Recurring injuries marred the 2022 season. Despite shining performances from the pitching staff—including McClanahan, who was considered a Cy Young candidate and started the 2022 All-Star Game for the AL, and Drew Rasmussen, who flirted with a perfect game on August 14—the team finished third in the AL East behind Toronto and New York. The team did make history on Sep 15 when it fielded the first all-Latino lineup in MLB history—coincidentally, on Roberto Clemente Day—in an 11–0 victory over the Blue Jays. The Rays still qualified for a Wild Card berth, but lost to Cleveland in a two-game series where the Rays scored one total run; the second game was characterized as a "historic pitcher's duel", as it was the first postseason game to go 14 innings without a run scored before Oscar Gonzalez hit a walk-off home run in the 15th inning.

The 2023 season also started promising, as the Rays managed to tie the modern era (post-1900) record for most consecutive wins to start a season with thirteen. Yandy Díaz, hitting .330, earned the franchise's first American League batting title. However, injuries decimated the starting rotation, as McClanahan, Rasmussen, and Jeffrey Springs all went down with Tommy John surgery, and a dismal July (where they went 8–16) saw the Rays fall behind the Orioles in the division race; they ended with 99 wins, two wins behind the 101 of Baltimore. Tampa Bay hosted the eventual world champion Texas Rangers in another two-game Wild Card loss where the Rays never led at any point with just one run scored yet again.

In 2024, muddled in a season where they could not stay definitively over .500, the Rays traded away multiple players at the deadline, including Randy Arozarena and All-Star Isaac Paredes. The Rays missed the postseason for the first time since 2018, finishing with a losing record for the first time since 2017.

On June 18, 2025, the Rays confirmed that they had begun exclusive discussions with a group led by Jacksonville home builder Patrick Zalupski to potentially purchase the franchise. On July 14, news broke that Zalupski would purchase the team for approximately $1.7 billion. The sale closed on September 30.

After two straight seasons of under-.500 play, the 2026 team bounced back with a 98-win season that saw them win their first AL East title since 2021. They won the Division Series in a sweep over the New York Yankees for their first postseason series win in six years to reach the League Championship Series against Cleveland. They lost two of the first three games before winning three in a row, which included the clinching Game 6 to win their third league pennant and reach the World Series against the Milwaukee Brewers.

== Season results ==
The records of the Rays' last six seasons in Major League Baseball.

American League champions *	Division champions ^	Wild card berth ¤

MLB season	Team season	League	Division	Regular season					Postseason	Awards
MLB season	Team season	League	Division	Finish (Note: The Finish column lists regular season results and excludes postseason play.)	Wins (Note: The Wins and Losses columns list regular season results and exclude any postseason play. Regular and postseason records are combined only at the bottom of the list.)	Losses	Win%	GB (Note: The GB column lists "Games Back" from the team that finished in first place that season. It is determined by finding the difference in wins plus the difference in losses divided by two.)	Postseason	Awards
2021	2021	AL	East ^	1st	100	62	.617	—	Lost ALDS (Red Sox) 3–1	Randy Arozarena (ROY); Kevin Cash (MOY)
2022	2022	AL	East	3rd ¤	86	76	.531	13	Lost ALWC (Guardians) 2–0	
2023	2023	AL	East	2nd ¤	99	63	.611	2	Lost ALWC (Rangers) 2–0	Yandy Díaz (Batting title)
2024	2024	AL	East	4th	80	82	.494	14		
2025	2025	AL	East	4th	77	85	.475	17		
2026	2026	AL *	East ^	1st	98	64	.605	––	Lost World Series (Brewers) 4–1	

These statistics are current through the 2026 Major League Baseball regular season.

== Rivals ==
=== AL East ===
Tampa Bay's primary rivals are the Boston Red Sox and the New York Yankees.

==== Boston Red Sox ====
The Red Sox/Rays rivalry dates back to the 2000 season, when Devil Ray Gerald Williams took exception to being hit by a pitch thrown by Boston pitcher Pedro Martínez and charged the mound, resulting in a game full of retaliations and ejections on both sides. There have been several other incidents between the teams during the ensuing years, including one in 2005 that resulted in two bench-clearing fights during the game and a war of words between then-Devil Rays manager Lou Piniella and then-Boston pitcher Curt Schilling through the media in the following days. The rivalry reached its highest level to date during the 2008 season, including a brawl during a June meeting in Fenway Park and a seven-game American League Championship Series between the teams that ended in the Rays' first ever pennant win.

==== New York Yankees ====
As a fellow member of the AL East division, the Yankees and Rays play many times each season. There has always been some feeling of a rivalry between the teams because the Yankees make Tampa their spring training home, as well as having a minor league team in the Tampa Tarpons; home and fan loyalty in the Tampa Bay area has historically been divided, especially among transplants from the northeastern U.S. The rivalry became more heated in spring training of 2008, when a home plate collision between Rays outfielder Elliot Johnson and Yankees catcher Francisco Cervelli was followed the next day by spikes-high slide by Yankees outfielder Shelley Duncan into Rays' second baseman Akinori Iwamura, prompting Rays outfielder Jonny Gomes to charge in from his position in right field and knock Duncan to the ground.

In a 2020 incident at Yankee Stadium, Yankee closer Aroldis Chapman threw a 101-mph fastball over the head of Rays batter Mike Brosseau, leading to the ejection of Rays manager Kevin Cash and the clearing of benches. Chapman earned a three-game suspension. In response to the incident, Cash said that, if it continued to happen, the Rays had "a whole damn stable" of pitchers capable of throwing 98 miles an hour. Later that year, the Rays and Yankees would meet in postseason for the first time in the 2020 American League Division Series, which Tampa Bay won in five games; the go-ahead run, in the eighth inning of Game 5, was a home run by Brosseau off of Chapman.

In the heat of the 2022 division race, there were several confrontations as the Rays neared the first-place Yankees. Days after the Yankee Josh Donaldson traded barbs with Rays starter Jeffrey Springs, benches cleared when Donaldson was nearly hit by a pitch. In 2023, tensions erupted in a series at Tropicana Field, where the Yankees hit five Rays batters in three games. Benches cleared twice in one inning on August 27 after Randy Arozarena was hit by Albert Abreu; Arozarena, who had been hit by Abreu in May, said he believed it was intentional. Yankee pitcher Ian Hamilton (who earlier hit Jonathan Aranda) said of the Rays, "If they want to come over here [to our clubhouse], they can come over here," while Tampa Bay's Brandon Lowe said the Rays shouldn't "worry" about a "last-place team" like the Yankees. "They're trying to ignite something over there, whatever. It's not worth our time at this moment."

=== Citrus Series ===
The Rays also have a geographical, interleague rivalry with the Miami Marlins. Tampa Bay currently leads the series, 81–60.

== Ballparks ==
=== Tropicana Field ===
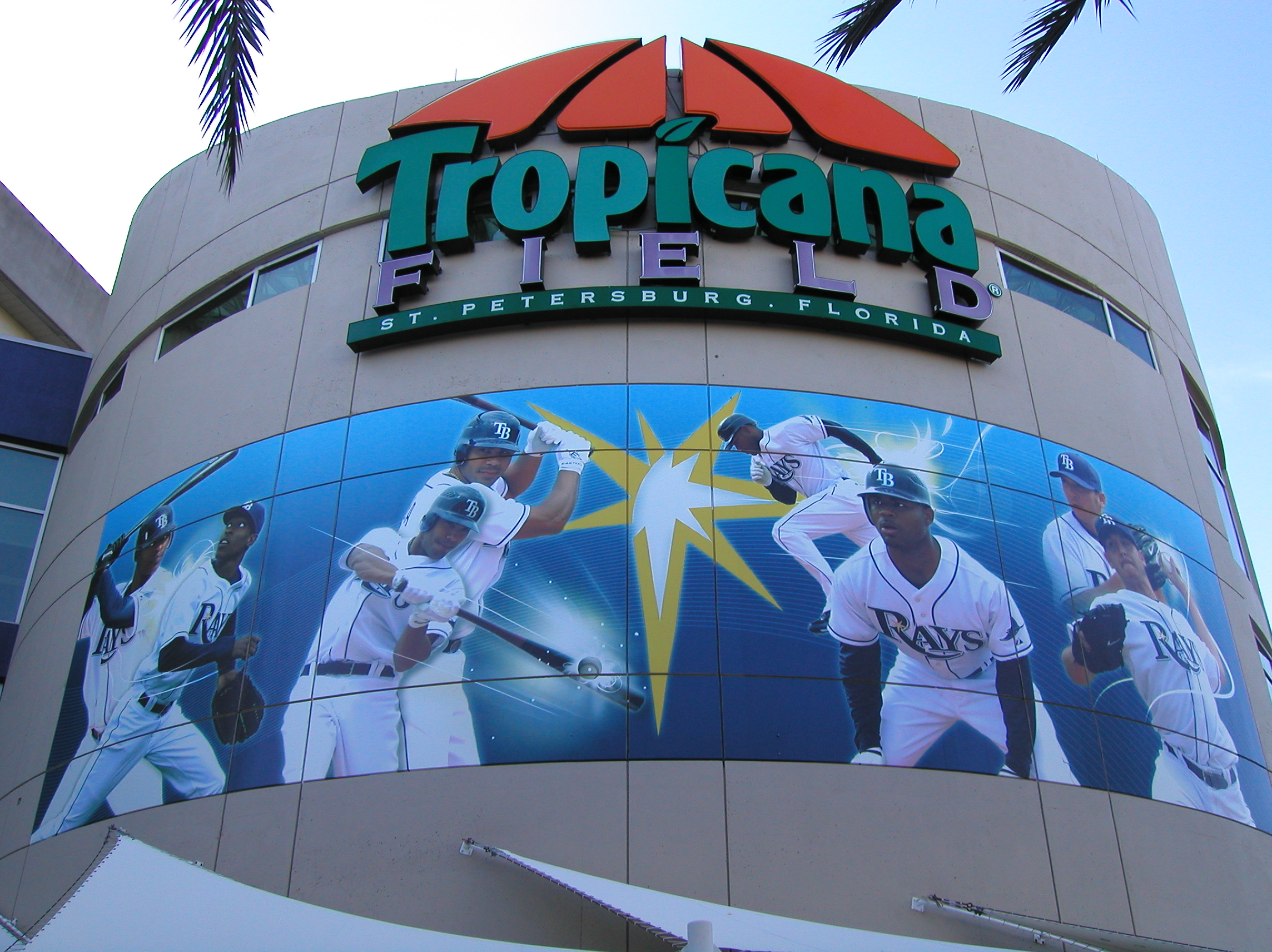
The Rays play their home games at Tropicana Field.

The Tampa Bay Rays play their home games at Tropicana Field, a fixed-roof dome stadium located at One Tropicana Drive, St. Petersburg, Florida. The stadium has a seating capacity of 25,000.

The Rays have played at Tropicana Field since their inaugural 1998 season. Originally constructed in the late 1980s as the Florida Suncoast Dome, the facility was purpose-built to attract a Major League Baseball franchise through relocation or expansion. After St. Petersburg was awarded an MLB expansion franchise in 1995, the dome underwent significant renovations, and naming rights were sold to Tropicana Products, a juice brand headquartered in nearby Bradenton, Florida.

Following Stu Sternberg's acquisition of controlling ownership in 2005, Tropicana Field was further renovated in 2006 and 2007 with a focus on improving the overall fan experience. A significant upgrade for players came with the installation of a FieldTurf playing surface in 2007, later replaced by a newer generation AstroTurf surface ahead of the 2011 season.

Tropicana Field is made unique by several distinctive features. First, it is the only MLB stadium with a slanted, fixed roof. Its signature tilted dome is one of the most recognizable structures in professional sports and keeps the field sheltered from Florida's unpredictable weather as well as keeping a climate controlled environment. The stadium also features a 25-foot, 10,000 gallon ray touch tank, called the Cownose Clubhouse, where fans can interact with live cownose rays. Finally, the stadium is home to four rotunda restaurants and bars, allowing fans to enjoy elevated dining and social spaces.

==== Return after Hurricane Milton ====
In October 2024, Hurricane Milton caused catastrophic damage to Tropicana Field, breaking off large pieces of its roof and flooding the interior. This caused the Tampa Bay Rays to be displaced for the 2025 season, temporarily relocating to Steinbrenner Field in Tampa. After nearly $60 million in repairs, the Rays have returned to Tropicana Field for the 2026 season.

==== Transportation ====
Tropicana Field is made accessible to fans via several public transportation options making it convenient to fans across Tampa Bay without a car. The Pinellas Suncoast Transit Authority (PSTA) operates multiple bus routes with stops near the stadium. Fans traveling from Tampa can take advantage of the Suncoast Beach Trolley or the Tampa Bay

=== George M. Steinbrenner Field ===
On November 14, 2024, the Rays announced that the team would play the 2025 regular season at George M. Steinbrenner Field in Tampa, the spring training home of the New York Yankees. Tropicana Field was significantly damaged by Hurricane Milton on October 9 and was not available when the team opened the regular season in late March. The Yankees continued to play spring training games at George M. Steinbrenner Field in 2025, and the Rays continued to use Charlotte Sports Park in Port Charlotte, Fla., for their spring training workouts and games.

George M. Steinbrenner Field was selected as the Rays temporary regular-season home because it is the best-prepared facility in the Tampa Bay region to host regular-season Major League Baseball games. George M. Steinbrenner Field was already undergoing renovations to improve its clubhouse and playing facilities. Recent projects include upgraded field lighting, expanded home locker room space, and improved training and rehabilitation capabilities. It is also the largest spring-training stadium in the region with a capacity of approximately 11,000 patrons.

=== Proposed new ballpark ===
The Rays' former ownership has stated that Tropicana Field does not generate enough revenue, and that its location in St. Petersburg is too far from the Tampa Bay area's primary population center in Hillsborough County. Rays attendance has historically ranked among the lowest compared to all MLB teams including seasons following a playoff berth. Rays attendance at Tropicana Field slightly improved in two seasons following playoff berths between 2008 and 2013 but dropped in two other seasons following playoff berths in the same span. After the Rays earned the best AL record in 2010, average attendance in 2011 dropped by 4,100 per game. In 2019 the Rays average attendance was 14,552 per game.

In 2007, the team announced a plan to build a covered ballpark at the current site of Al Lang Field on the St. Petersburg waterfront, and a local referendum was scheduled to decide on public financing. However, in the face of vocal opposition, the Rays withdrew the proposal in 2009 and stated they had abandoned all plans for a ballpark on the downtown St. Petersburg waterfront, preferring a location nearer to the center of Pinellas County or across the bay in Tampa.

Since 2009, local officials, media, and business leaders have explored possibilities for a new stadium for the Rays somewhere in the Tampa Bay area. However, St. Petersburg mayor Bill Foster repeatedly insisted that the Rays honor their use agreement with the city, which runs through 2027 and prohibits the team from entering into talks with other communities, resulting in a protracted stalemate. Foster was replaced by Mayor Rick Kriseman in 2013.

In October 2014, Sternberg, frustrated with efforts to build a new stadium in the Tampa Bay area, had discussions with Wall Street associates about moving the Rays to Montreal, which has been without a Major League Baseball franchise since the Montreal Expos moved to Washington, D.C., in 2005 to become the Washington Nationals. On December 9, 2014, reports surfaced that owner Stuart Sternberg will sell the team if a new stadium is not built.

On February 9, 2018, the team said that Ybor City is their preferred site for a new stadium. However, at the December 2018 Winter Meetings in Las Vegas, Sternberg announced that plans for the proposed stadium in Ybor fell through, meaning the Rays were still on track to play at Tropicana Field until 2027. Later in December 2018, the team sent a letter to Mayor Kriseman, foregoing an extension to search for a new stadium outside of the city.

On June 20, 2019, Major League Baseball's executive council gave the team permission to explore playing early-season home games in the Tampa Bay area and later-season home games in Montreal—the former home of the National League's Montreal Expos until 2004—with 2024 the earliest prospective date such an arrangement was thought to be feasible. The plan would have entailed spending spring training and the first two months of the regular season in an open-air stadium in Tampa, before moving north for the rest of the season. It would have been the first time a Major League team "split" seasons in two different cities since the Expos played 22 games in Puerto Rico during the 2004 season. The last time any team in North America's major professional sports leagues "split" their season on (what was intended to be) a permanent basis was the National Basketball Association's Kansas City Kings, which played three seasons partially in Omaha.

Team president Matt Silverman announced the Rays' intention to display a "Tampa Bay/Montreal" graphic in the right field foul territory at Tropicana Field during the 2021 MLB postseason to promote the team's split-city concept for the future, although those plans were dropped shortly after alongside an apology from owner Stuart Sternberg, who said he made "a real mistake, in trying to promote our sister-city plan with a sign right now in our home ballpark".

In January 2022, MLB commissioner Rob Manfred informed Sternberg that the split-season plan would not be allowed to proceed. Sternberg went on to say that the franchise would resume to explore sites around the Tampa Bay area as well as a new city altogether.

On September 19, 2023, the Rays announced that they planned to build a new ballpark in St. Petersburg adjacent to Tropicana Field as part of the redevelopment of the Gas Plant District and would have opened for the 2028 season. It was expected to be a 30,000 seat fixed roof stadium that would have cost $1.3 billion. On March 13, 2025, the Rays announced that they would not pursue the stadium.

In January 2026, it was reported that a site near Hillsborough College's Dale Mabry campus was the new location for the new ballpark and 110 acre mixed use district with a memorandum of understanding being signed later that month to pursue development. The location is close to George M. Steinbrenner Field, Raymond James Stadium, and Tampa International Airport. In February 2026, the state of Florida approved the land transfer to Hillsborough College. In August 2026, the Tampa City Council approved a deal that would begin development of the new stadium.

On August 27, 2026 the city of Tampa approved their agreement for the Dale Mabry Stadium. The next day, Hillsborough County approved their deal with that same stadium.

== Logo and uniform history ==
=== 1998–2000: Devil Rays rainbow ===
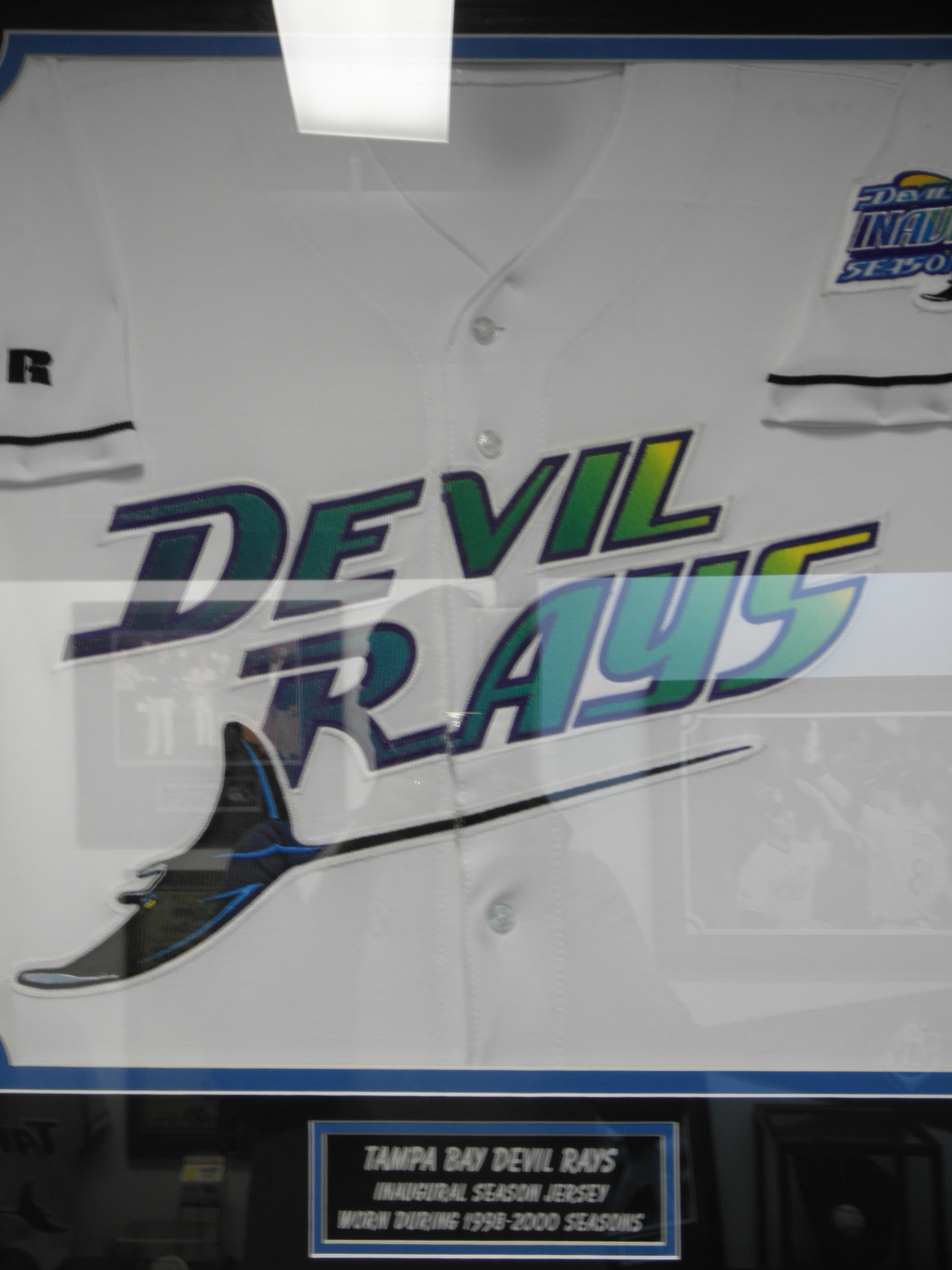
The Tampa Bay Devil Rays uniform used from 1998 to 2000

During their first three seasons, the Devil Rays wore traditional white home and gray road uniforms with the text "Devil Rays" (home) and "Tampa Bay" (road) in an unconventional multicolor "rainbow" across the chest. The intended inaugural caps were also unusual: black with a purple brim at home and all black on the road, with both versions featuring a devil ray graphic and no letters at all. However, for most games, the team wore their all-black alternate caps, featuring a smaller ray and the letters "TB" for both home and road games, with the purple-brimmed caps only occasionally seeing use late in the season. During the 1999 and 2000 seasons, the Devil Rays wore an alternate black jersey featuring the same rainbow text as the white and gray uniforms.

=== 2001–2007: Rays greens ===
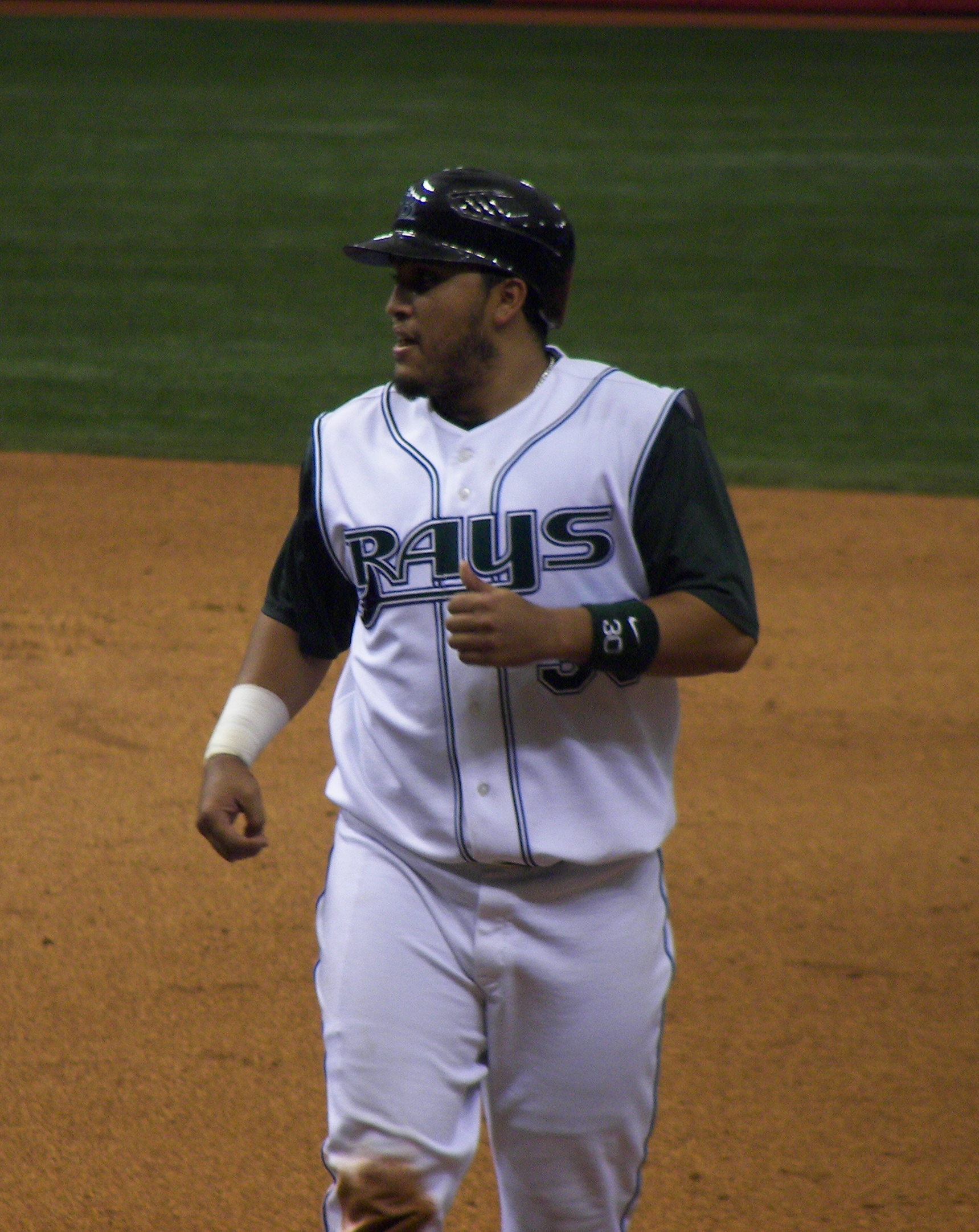
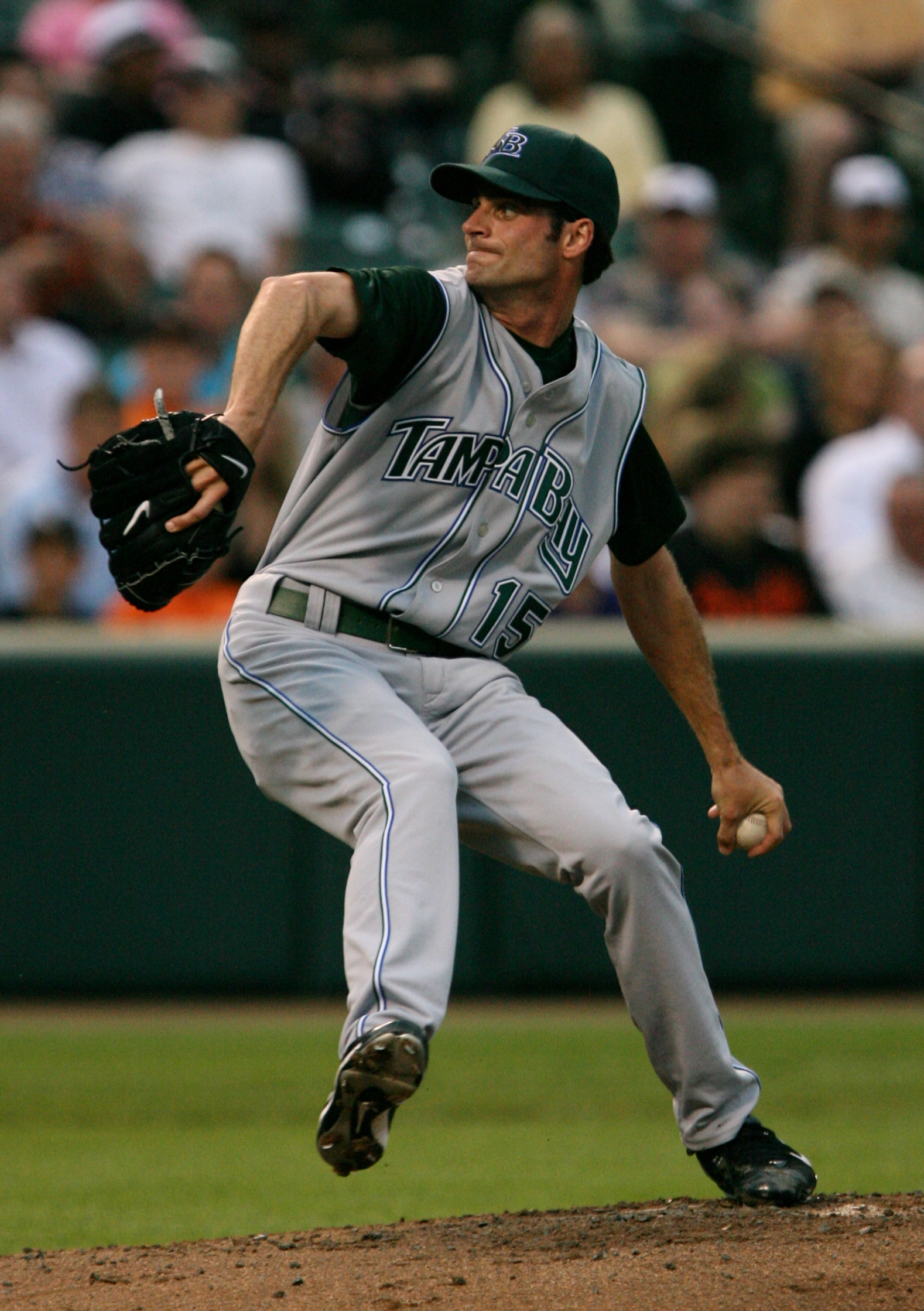
Dioner Navarro (left) and Casey Fossum wearing the 2001–2007 home and road uniforms.

In 2001, the Devil Rays dropped the multicolor text and de-emphasized purple in favor of more green. They also changed the font on their jersey tops and shortened the name on the home whites to read simply "Rays" while keeping "Tampa Bay" on the road grays.

In 2005, the home uniforms were again tweaked to include still more green. The primary home whites became a sleeveless jersey worn with green sleeved undershirts, and the primary home caps were changed from black to green. In addition, a small ray with a long tail was added under the name "Rays" on the chest of the home jerseys.

=== 2008–present ===
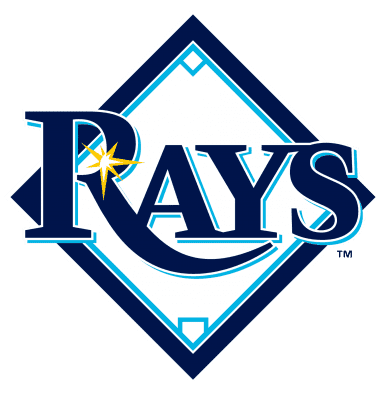
Rays primary logo, 2008–2018

The current Rays primary uniform has been used with little change since the team officially shortened its name from "Devil Rays" to "Rays" for the 2008 season. The home jersey is a traditional white with the name "Rays" in dark blue across the chest and a yellow "sunburst" on the letter "R". The Rays' road uniform is gray, also with a sunburst and the team name across the chest. Both feature dark blue piping and caps featuring a white "TB" logo.

The Rays' first alternate jersey also features the name "Rays" and a yellow sunburst on chest, but is a dark blue material with Columbia blue piping, white characters for the player name, and player numbers that are simply a white outline. This alternate jersey is worn both at home and on the road with either white or gray pants. The Rays' second alternate jersey is similar, but is a light Columbia blue. This second alternate was usually worn only for Sunday home games with white pants, paired since 2018 with an alternate dark blue cap with the team's classic "devil ray" logo. The second alternate was modified for the 2022 season by replacing the "Rays" wordmark with the sunburst logo on the right chest.

Starting in 2023, the Rays abandoned the gray road jerseys in favor of their 1998 "Rainbow" Devil Rays uniforms, which the team had been wearing on occasional home games since 2018. The road jerseys are now either the navy blue or Columbia blue tops with gray pants. The team announced that the throwbacks would be worn on Opening Day, as part of the team's celebrations for its 25th anniversary season, as well as at all Friday home games.

On September 21, 2026, the Rays unveiled a gray road jersey which is a modernized version of the original "Rainbow" Devil Rays uniform. This uniform set debuted the following night against the New York Yankees, and would serve as the primary road uniform beginning in 2027, though they eventually wore them in every road game during the 2026 postseason. The Columbia blue top was retired after the 2026 season.

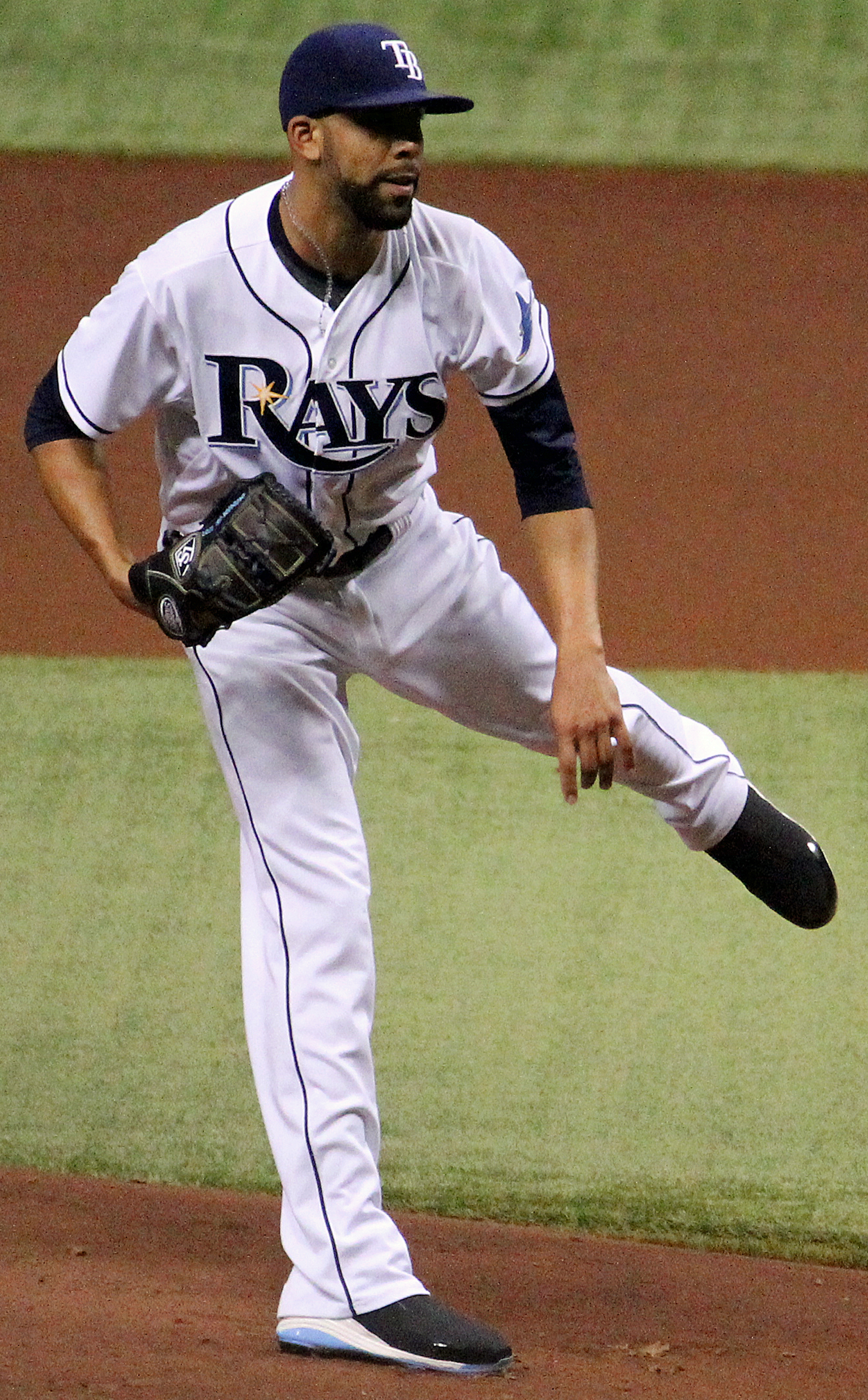
Home uniform (2008–present), worn by David Price.

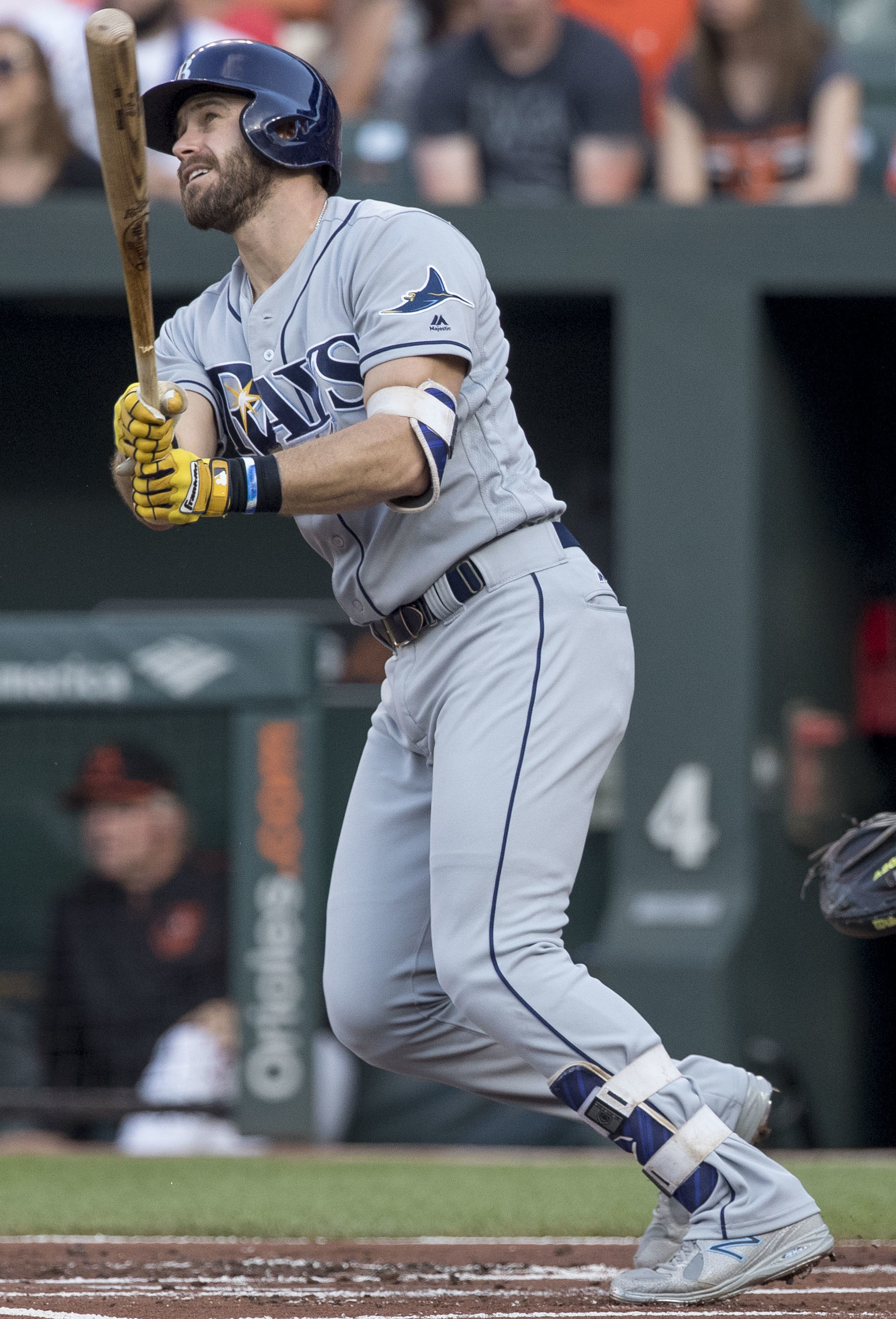
Road uniform (2008–2022), worn by Evan Longoria.

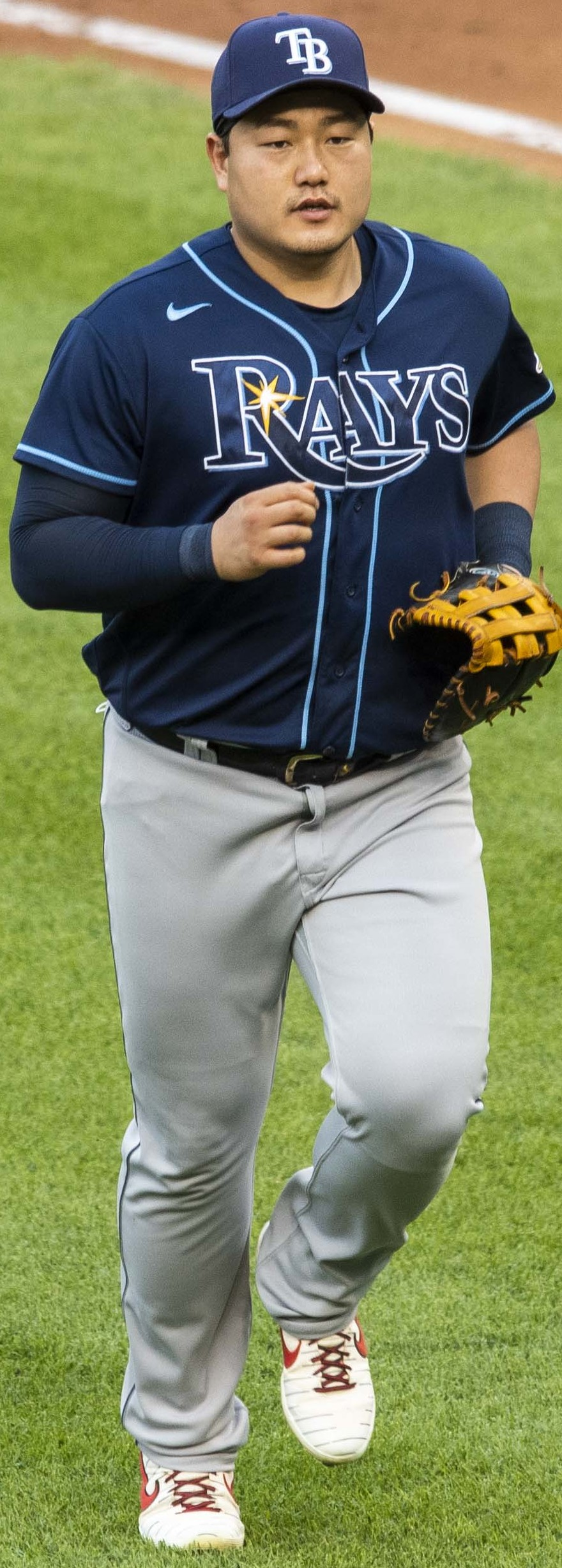
Navy alternate (2009–2022, 2027–present); road uniform (2023–2026), worn by Ji-man Choi.

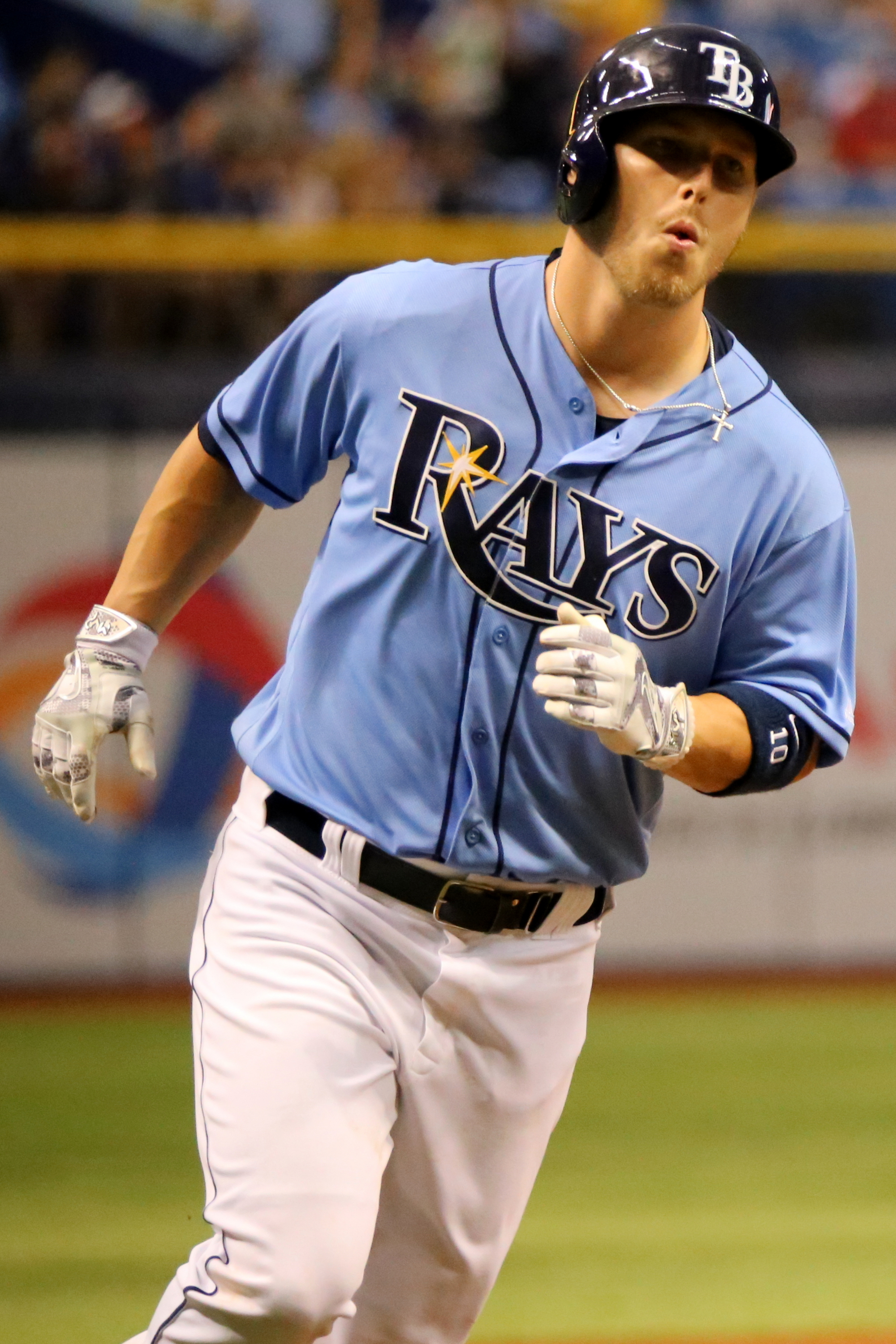
Columbia blue alternate (2010–2021), worn by Corey Dickerson.

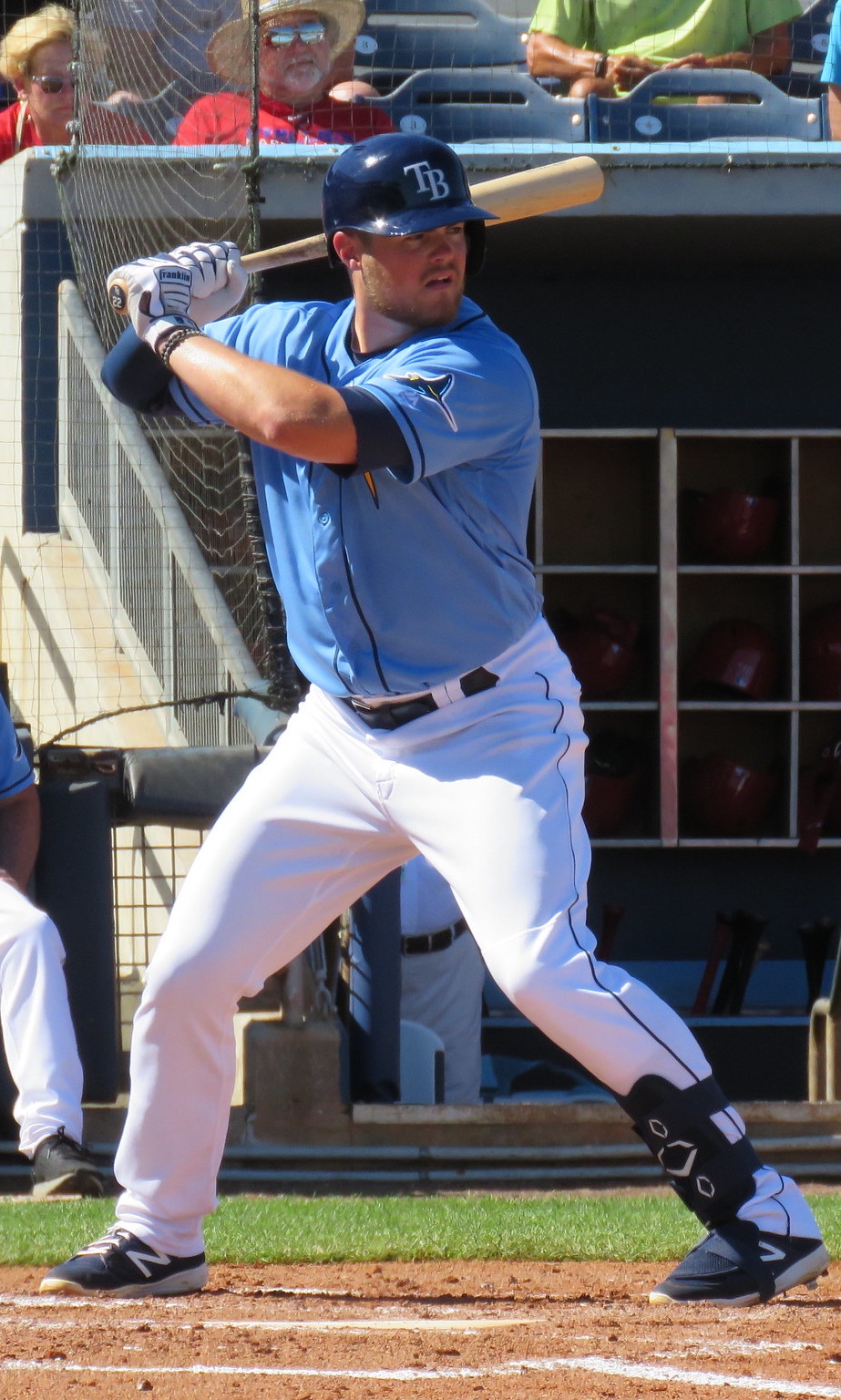
Columbia blue alternate (2022–2026), worn by Christian Arroyo.

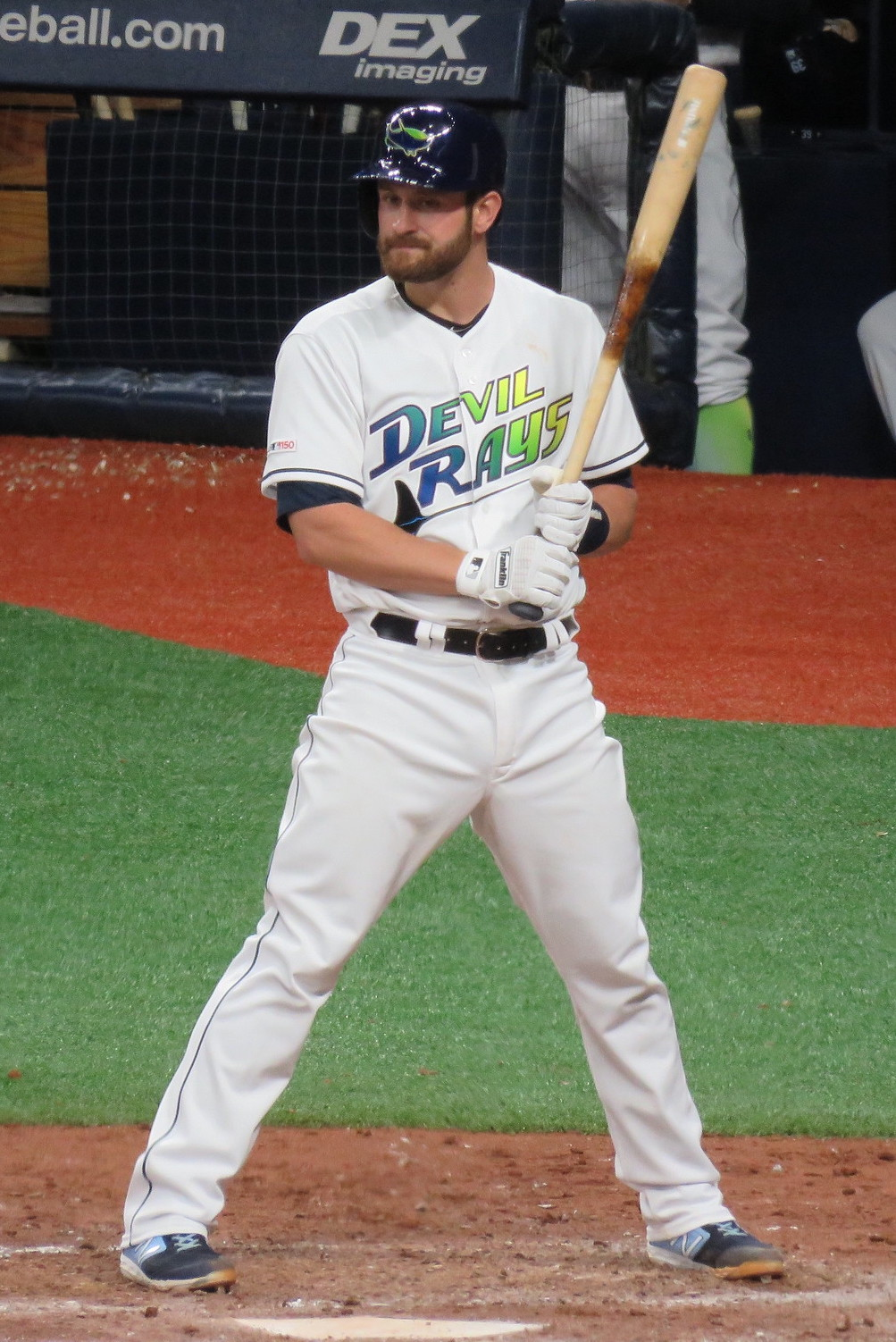
Devil Rays alternate (2023–present), worn by Nick Ciuffo.

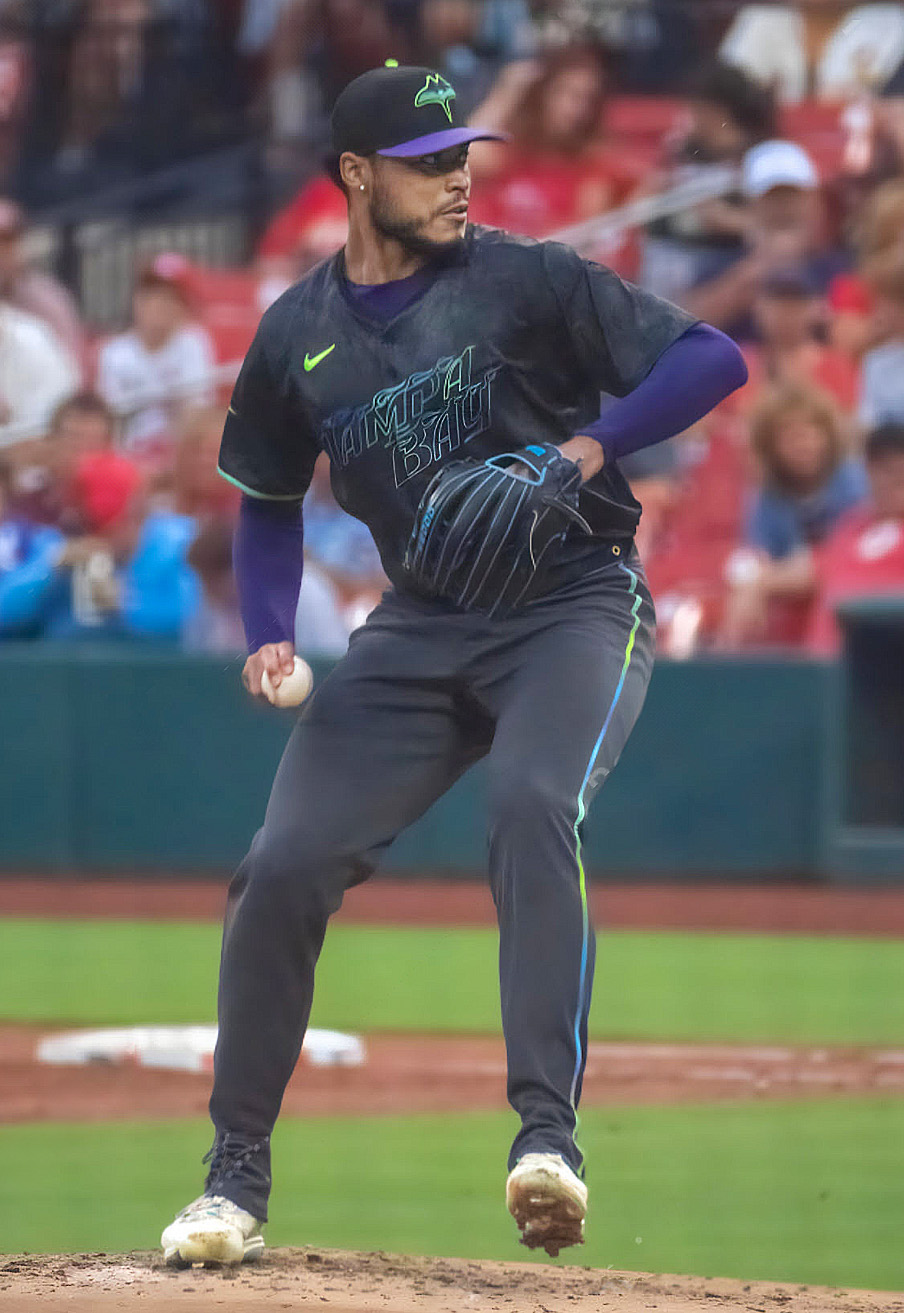
City Connect (2024–present), worn by Taj Bradley.

=== "Turn Back the Clock" Nights ===
The Rays first staged "Turn Back the Clock" promotions with a retro theme and throwback uniforms early in their existence, and it has become an annual tradition since 2006.

After the 2008 rebranding, the Rays first revisited the Devil Rays name in 2009, wearing the "rainbow" uniforms from their 1998 inaugural season. They returned to the rainbow uniforms in 2018 in honor of the franchise's twentieth anniversary, and continued to wear them on designated throwback days in the 2019, 2021, and 2022 seasons, paired with an alternate dark blue hat bearing the throwback "devil ray" logo. Starting in 2023, the rainbow Devil Rays uniforms were added to the official uniform rotation.

From 2012 to 2017, the Rays sported specially designed 1980 Tampa Bay Rays "faux-back" uniforms that represented what the team might have worn had the franchise existed during the late 1970s and early 1980s. These uniforms were patterned after those of the San Diego Padres from the late 1970s, but with the Rays' name (including a circular yellow sunburst) and team colors of gold, navy, and powder blue. In 2014, the Rays debuted a road version of the fauxback in an interleague game against the Chicago Cubs, this one with gold sleeves instead of navy. This version of the fauxback was later worn for two home games in 2017.

In addition to their own uniforms, the franchise has also worn the uniforms of other historical local teams. The Rays have worn the uniforms of the Tampa Tarpons of the Florida State League (in 1999, 2006, and 2010), the St. Petersburg Pelicans of the Senior Professional Baseball Association (in 2008), the St. Petersburg Saints (in 2000 and 2007) and Tampa Smokers of the Florida International League (in 2011), and the University of Tampa Spartans (in 2000).

The Rays' opponents on Turn Back the Clock night have also occasionally worn throwbacks from the same era as the Rays' retro uniforms. For example, the Houston Astros wore their 1980s "Rainbow Guts" uniforms, the New York Mets wore the road uniforms of their 1969 championship team, the Chicago White Sox wore their red and white home uniforms from the 1970s, and the Baltimore Orioles wore their rare all-orange uniforms from the early 1970s. Perhaps the most memorable such game was on June 23, 2007, when the Devil Rays wore St. Pete Saints uniforms from the early 1950s, and the Los Angeles Dodgers wore the gray road uniforms of the World Series-winning 1955 Brooklyn Dodgers to honor Don Zimmer, who played on that Dodger team and was a senior adviser for the Rays prior to his death. Rays management also gave away a bobblehead at the game featuring a young Zimmer in a Dodgers uniform and an older Zimmer in a Devil Rays uniform.

=== City Connect ===
In 2024, the Rays introduced their "City Connect" uniforms. The uniform, jersey and pants, is mostly dark. The jersey features "Tampa Bay" across the jersey, the first since 2007 as the Devil Rays, in black lettering outlined in neon. The wordmark is from their road uniforms from 1998 to 2000. The cap features the Sunshine Skyway Bridge, which crosses into St. Petersburg, Florida, along with Stingray below, referred to as the "skyray". Another logo features three palm trees and a pelican, both of which have several ties to the area. The three palms logo can be seen on a Florida Historical Marker, such as the one located at Perry Harvey Sr. Park, also known as the "Bro Bowl", Florida's first public skatepark, and the first to be listed on any national registry of historic sites. The pelican is featured on the flag of St. Petersburg, and it is a nod to the St. Petersburg Pelicans, who played in the Florida State Negro Baseball League in the 1940s and ‘50s.

== Team media ==
=== Radio ===
WDAE (620 AM) has been the flagship station of the Rays radio network since 2009. The play-by-play announcers are Andy Freed and Neil Solondz. Dave Wills served as a play-by-play announcer for 18 seasons before his death in March 2023. Rich Herrera served as the host during pre- and post-game shows for the Tampa Rays Baseball Radio Network from 2005 to 2011. The (Devil) Rays original radio team consisted of Paul Olden and Charlie Slowes, who broadcast games from 1998 to 2005. Slowes went to the Washington Nationals, where he is now lead announcer, while Olden pursued a photography career before replacing Bob Sheppard as the public address announcer at Yankee Stadium in 2008.

=== Television ===
FanDuel Sports Network Sun, previously known as Bally Sports Sun and Fox Sports Sun, broadcast the Rays' games on television for much of the team's history through the 2025 season. Through the 2008 season, many games also aired on Ion Television affiliate broadcast stations throughout the state of Florida, with WXPX-TV in Tampa as the flagship, until Fox Sports signed an exclusivity agreement with the Rays, airing all locally broadcast games each season. Beginning in 2025, Rays games returned to free TV through WTOG in St. Petersburg, broadcasting a selection of ten games throughout the season.

Dewayne Staats (play-by-play) and former MLB pitcher Brian Anderson (color commentary) are the TV voices of the Rays. For the first 11 seasons of the franchise, Staats teamed with former MLB pitcher Joe Magrane on the Rays' TV broadcasts. Magrane departed after conclusion of the 2008 season to take a position at the MLB Network. Former minors catcher and MLB manager Kevin Kennedy then served as the primary color commentator in 2009 and 2010, with Brian Anderson filling in on some road trips, after which Anderson took over as the everyday commentator from 2011. Since the 2024 season, radio broadcaster Andy Freed has filled in for Staats on selected road trips during the season, a role previously filled by Kevin Burkhardt in 2019.

Following years of instability after Fox Sports Sun was sold to Diamond Sports Group, the Rays ended their association with the network, instead signing on with MLB's in-house broadcasting platform to launch Rays.TV, an in-market streaming option offshooting from MLB.TV, retaining FanDuel Sports Network Sun's on-air talent. Rays.TV replaced FanDuel Sports Network Sun's coverage in most cable and satellite television packages ahead of the 2026 season. Ahead of the 2026 season, the Rays also renewed deals to broadcast ten games over the air in the Tampa Bay market.

=== Awards ===
Staats, Magrane, Wills, Olden and Slowes have all been nominated for the Ford C. Frick Award, the broadcasters' path to the Baseball Hall of Fame.

=== The Rookie ===
The Tampa Bay Devil Rays were featured in the movie The Rookie, a 2002 drama directed by John Lee Hancock. It is based on the true story of pitcher Jim Morris, who had a brief but famous Major League Baseball career with the team. Morris spent parts of two seasons with the Tampa Bay Devil Rays as a reliever, pitching 15 innings in 21 games, with an earned run average of 4.80 and no decisions.

== Rays fandom ==
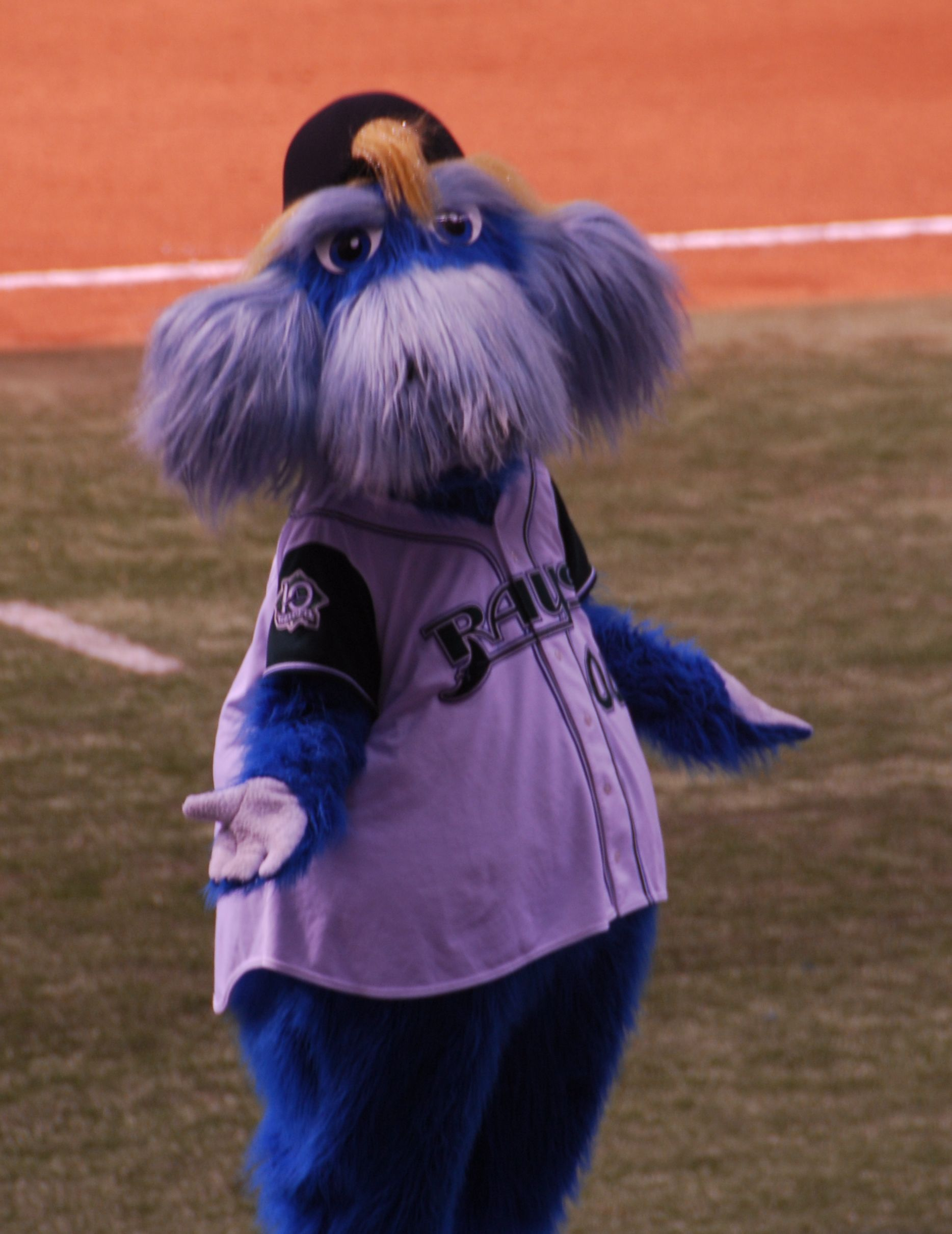
Raymond, the Rays' first mascot, pictured in 2007.

=== Mascots ===
The Rays have two primary mascots, Raymond and DJ Kitty.

Raymond was introduced during the team's inaugural season in 1998, and is referred to as a "seadog." Raymond interacts with fans throughout the stadium prior to each home game, and can be seen rallying fans throughout games, either by walking through the stands, or climbing on top of the home dugout. After each Rays win at home, Raymond will wave a large "Rays Win" flag in the outfield.

DJ Kitty was introduced in 2010, initially through a video that would play on the scoreboard whenever the game situation called for a rally, in which a large anthropomorphic cat, wearing a Rays jersey, appeared on the screen wielding a turntable similar to those used by rap DJs. Loud music is played over the PA system while the arrival of DJ Kitty is proclaimed on display boards throughout the ballpark. Similarly to Raymond, DJ Kitty will interact with fans and pose for pictures in the stadium prior to each home game, and participates in activities with Raymond, including a mascot race and other between-inning entertainment. The character was created by Rays entertainment director Lou Costanza in an attempt to rally the Rays players and the fans at Tropicana Field.

=== More Cowbell ===
The Rays' Cowbell was originally a promotional idea thought up by principal owner Stuart Sternberg, who got the idea from the Saturday Night Live sketch. Since then, it has become a standard feature of home games, something akin to the Sacramento Kings of the NBA and the bells their fans ring during games. Road teams have often considered the cowbell a nuisance. The cowbells are rung most prominently when the opposing batter has two strikes, when the opposing fans try to chant, and when the Rays make a good play.

=== Professional wrestlers ===
Rays games are frequently visited by professional wrestlers, as there are a large number of wrestlers living in the Tampa Bay Area. The Nasty Boys (Brian Knobs and Jerry Sags), Brutus Beefcake, and Hulk Hogan all appeared on a semi-regular basis at Rays games. John Cena appears on occasion.

The Rays held a "Legends of Wrestling Night" on May 18, 2007, featuring several wrestling matches after the game, an 8–4 loss to the Florida Marlins. Outfielder and wrestling fan Jonny Gomes ran interference for the Nasty Boys during the main event.

A second "Wrestling Night" was held on April 19, 2008, after a 5–0 win over the Chicago White Sox. Gomes participated again, this time making a post-match save for the Nasty Boys.

=== Team slogans ===
During Joe Maddon's tenure as the Rays manager, he and the team coined several slogans, including the mantra 9=8 for the 2008 season, explained by Maddon as meaning that if nine players play nine innings of hard baseball every day, that team would become one of the eight teams who qualify for the postseason. Prior to the 2008 season, the Rays had never had a winning season in franchise history, much less a postseason appearance. The slogan morphed throughout the 2008 MLB postseason as the Rays surpassed their previous team record for wins in a single season by more than 30 wins, and ultimately clinched the AL East division title for their first postseason appearance in franchise history. After they clinched their postseason spot, it became 9=4, to represent the teams advancing to the LCS. When they won the ALDS, it became 9=2, for the teams advancing to the World Series. When they won the ALCS, it became 9=1, representing the possible World Series Championship, although the Rays fell to the Philadelphia Phillies in five games. For the 2009 season, Maddon introduced a new slogan, '09 > '08, to represent that the season would be "greater" than the previous year.

Also while Maddon was the Rays' manager, Rays players and coaches sported mohawk haircuts, nicknamed "rayhawks". The trend started during their 2008 World Series run, and continued for several years until Maddon's departure following the 2014 season.

== Roster ==
Tampa Bay Rays 2027 spring training roster
40-man roster		Non-roster invitees	Coaches / other
Pitchers: -- Alexander Alberto; 47 Bryan Baker; 62 Cam Booser; 36 Joe Boyle; 60 Garrett Cleavinger; 54 Alex Cook; 59 Mason Englert; 88 Brody Hopkins; 22 Griffin Jax; 55 Ty Johnson; 49 Kevin Kelly; 67 Casey Legumina; 32 Steven Matz; 18 Shane McClanahan; 44 Ryan Pepiot; 57 Drew Rasmussen; 39 Manuel Rodríguez; 61 Ian Seymour; 71 Cole Sulser; 63 Edwin Uceta; 68 Tyler Wells	Catchers: 34 Liam Hicks; 50 Kenny Piper; Infielders: 8 Jonathan Aranda; 45 Jadher Areinamo; 13 Junior Caminero; -- Xavier Isaac; 1 Richie Palacios; 6 Taylor Walls; 7 Carson Williams; 15 Ben Williamson; Outfielders: 21 Jonny DeLuca; 29 Jacob Melton; 25 Víctor Mesa Jr.; 14 Chandler Simpson; -- Jack Suwinski; 26 Ryan Vilade; Designated hitters: 2 Yandy Díaz	Pitchers: -- Levi Stoudt; -- Kodi Whitley	Manager: 16 Kevin Cash; Coaches: 46 Will Bradley (assistant hitting); 10 Corey Dickerson (first base); 99 Misha Dworken (bullpen catcher); 41 Tomas Francisco (field coordinator); -- Kris Goodman (process and development); 52 Rick Knapp (assistant pitching and rehab); 27 Rodney Linares (bench); 33 Jorge Moncada (bullpen); 51 Chad Mottola (hitting); 23 Kyle Snyder (pitching); 30 Ozzie Timmons (assistant hitting); 96 Charlie Valerio (bullpen catcher); 4 Brady Williams (third base); Restricted list: 5 Wander Franco; 39 active, 0 inactive, 2 non-roster invitees; 7-, 10-, or 15-day injured list; * Not on active roster; ^{†} Suspended list; Roster, coaches, and NRIs updated November 19, 2026; Transactions • Depth chart; → All MLB rosters

== Minor league affiliations ==
The Tampa Bay Rays farm system consists of seven minor league affiliates.

Class	Team	League	Location	Ballpark	Affiliated
Triple-A	Durham Bulls	International League	Durham, North Carolina	Durham Bulls Athletic Park	1998
Double-A	Montgomery Biscuits	Southern League	Montgomery, Alabama	Dabos Park	1999
High-A	Bowling Green Hot Rods	South Atlantic League	Bowling Green, Kentucky	Bowling Green Ballpark	2009
Single-A	Charleston RiverDogs	Carolina League	Charleston, South Carolina	Joseph P. Riley Jr. Park	2021
Rookie	FCL Rays	Florida Complex League	Port Charlotte, Florida	Charlotte Sports Park	2009
Rookie	DSL Rays	Dominican Summer League	Boca Chica, Santo Domingo	Tampa Bay Rays Complex	2016
Rookie	DSL Tampa Bay	Dominican Summer League	Boca Chica, Santo Domingo	Tampa Bay Rays Complex	2016

== Awards, league leaders, and individual records ==
=== Baseball Hall of Famers ===
Tampa Bay Rays Hall of Famers
Affiliation according to the National Baseball Hall of Fame and Museum
Tampa Bay Devil Rays

Wade Boggs

Fred McGriff

- Players and managers listed in **bold** are depicted on their Hall of Fame plaques wearing a Devil Rays or Rays cap insignia.
- * Tampa Bay Rays listed as primary team according to the Hall of Fame

=== Tampa Bay Rays Hall of Fame ===
The Rays established a franchise Hall of Fame in 2023.

Key
Class	Year of induction
**Bold**	Inducted into Baseball Hall of Fame

Tampa Bay Rays Hall of Fame
Class	No.	Name	Position	Tenure with team
2023	66	Don Zimmer	Coach / advisor	2004–2014
2023	12	**Wade Boggs**	3B	1998–1999
2023	8; 13	Carl Crawford	LF	2002–2010
2024	–	Dave Wills	Team broadcaster	2005–2023
2024	19	**Fred McGriff**	1B	1998–2001, 2004
2026	3	Evan Longoria	3B	2008–2017

=== Florida Sports Hall of Fame ===
Rays in the Florida Sports Hall of Fame
No.	Name	Position	Tenure	Notes
11, 56	Hal McRae	Coach/Manager	2001–2002	Elected mainly on his performance with Kansas City Royals, born in Avon Park
12	Wade Boggs	3B	1998–1999	Elected mainly on his performance with Boston Red Sox, attended Henry B. Plant High School in Tampa
14	Lou Piniella	Manager	2003–2005	Born in Tampa
22	Johnny Damon	OF	2011	Raised in Orlando
24	Tino Martinez	1B	2004	Elected mainly on his performance with New York Yankees, born and raised in Tampa, attended University of Tampa
29	Fred McGriff	1B	1998–2001, 2004	Elected mainly on his performance with Atlanta Braves, born in Tampa
—	Dave Wills	Broadcaster	2005–2023	

=== Retired numbers ===
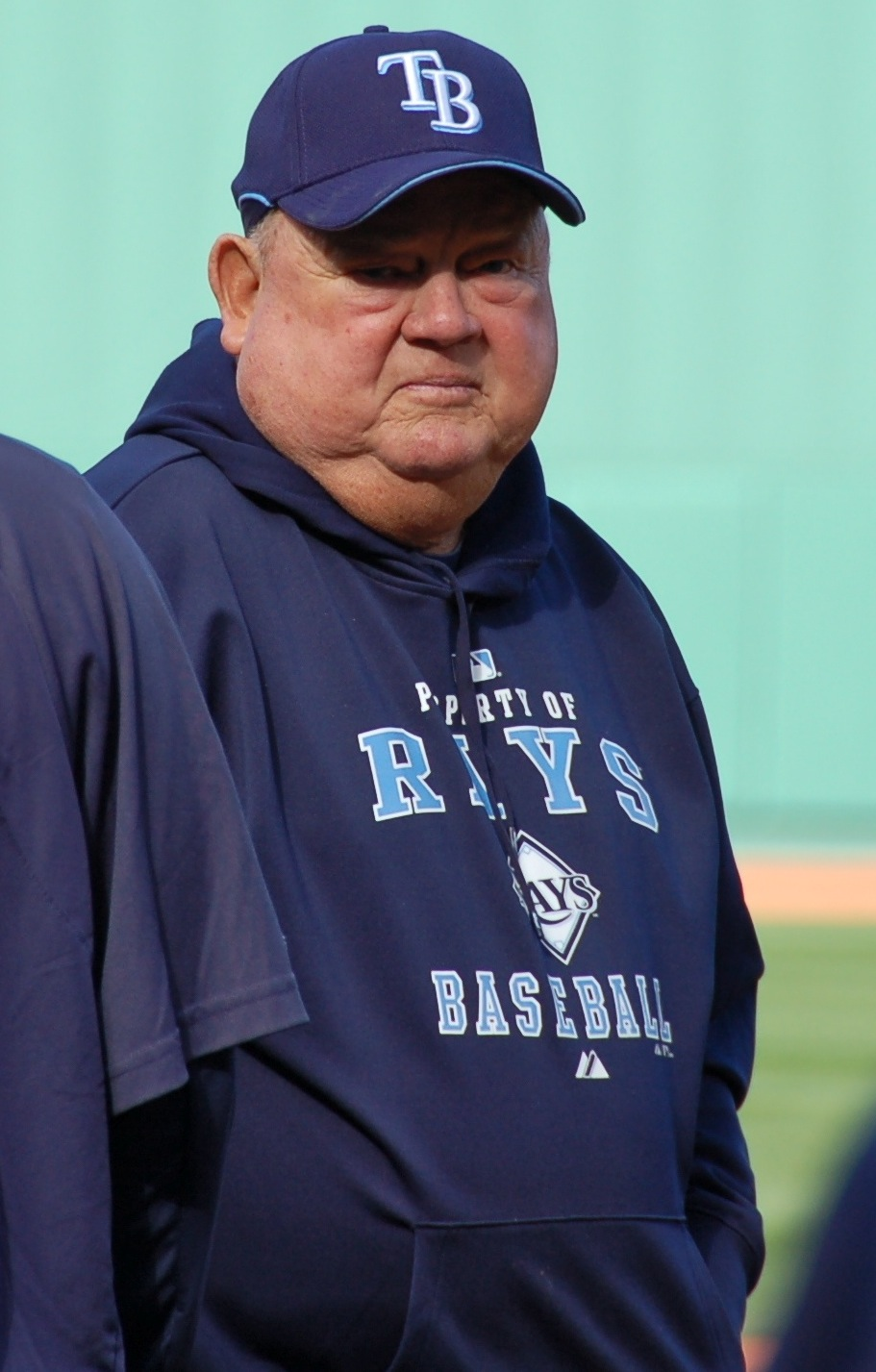
Don Zimmer had his no. 66 retired by the Rays.

The Tampa Bay Rays have retired three numbers. These numbers are displayed in the third base line upper deck.

Jackie Robinson's number 42 was retired by all of Major League Baseball in 1997 (a year before the Rays' inaugural season), thus outside Jackie Robinson Day when every MLB player wears number 42, no Rays player has ever donned the number.

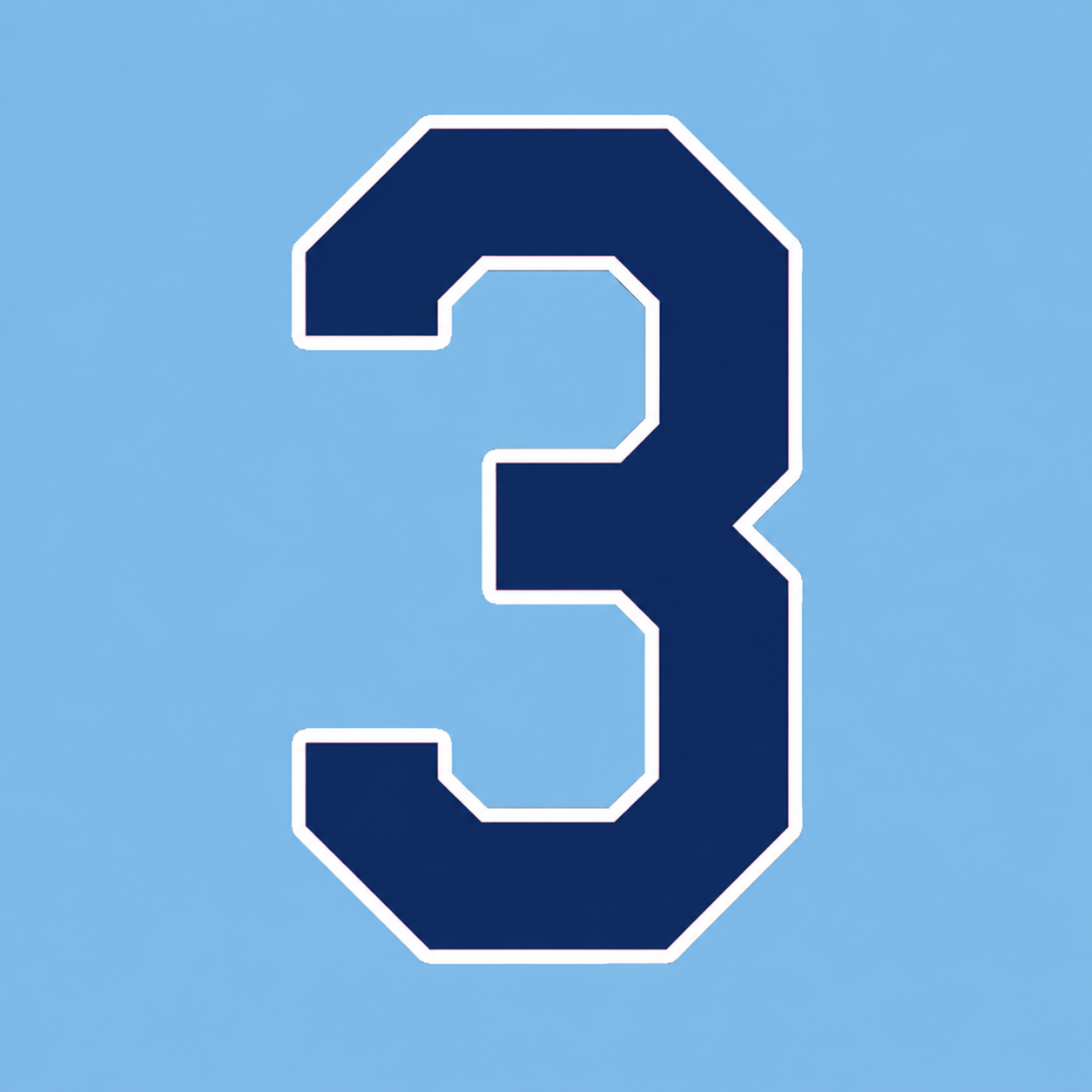
Evan
Longoria
3B
Retired July 12, 2026
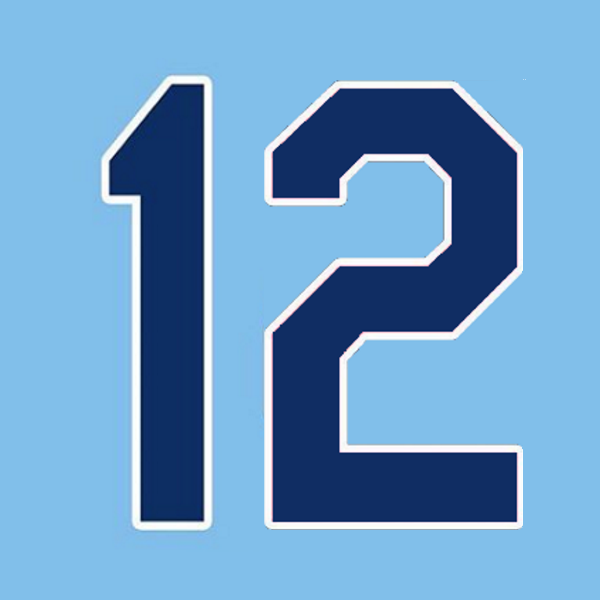
Wade
Boggs
3B
Retired April 7, 2000
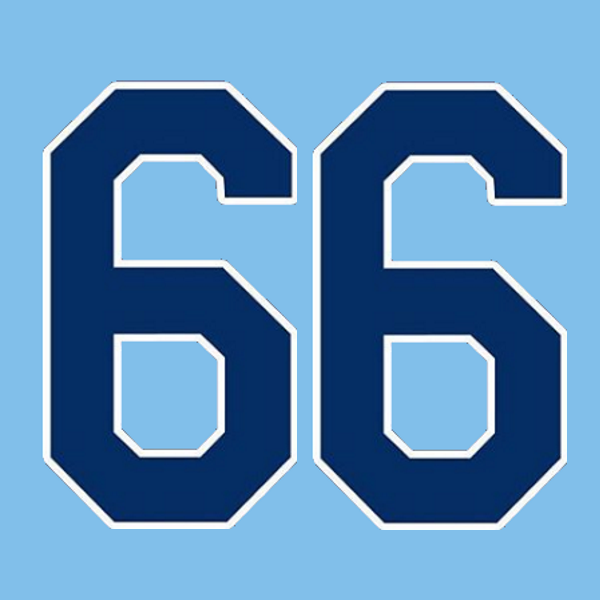
Don
Zimmer
Coach
Retired April 6, 2015
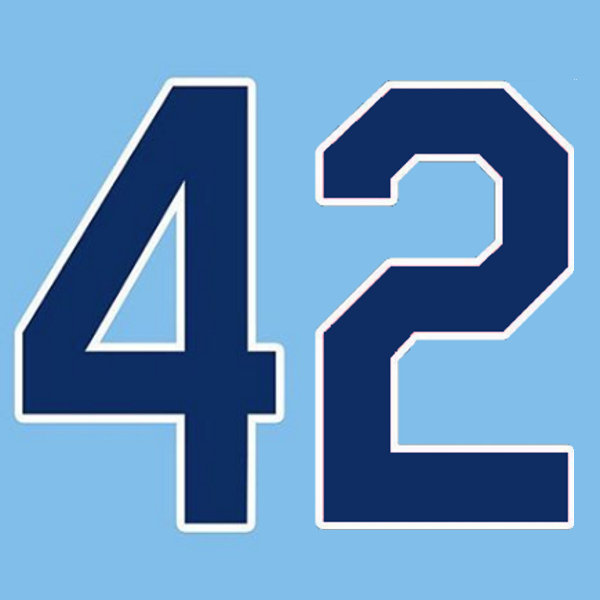
Jackie
Robinson
All MLB
Honored April 15, 1997

=== Selected individual franchise single-season records ===
Statistics below are through the end of the 2026 season.

- Highest batting average: .330, Yandy Díaz (2023)
- Most games: 162, Aubrey Huff (2003), Evan Longoria (2014), Delmon Young (2007), and Junior Caminero (2026)
- Most hits: 198, Aubrey Huff (2003)
- Highest slugging %: .627, Carlos Peña (2007)
- Most doubles: 47, Aubrey Huff (2003)
- Most triples: 19, Carl Crawford (2004)
- Most home runs: 46, Carlos Peña (2007)
- Most RBIs: 121, Carlos Peña (2007)
- Most stolen bases: 60, Carl Crawford (2009)
- Most wins: 21, Blake Snell (2018)
- Lowest ERA: 1.89, Blake Snell (2018)
- Strikeouts: 252, Chris Archer (2015)
- Complete games: 11, James Shields (2011)
- Shutouts: 4, James Shields (2011)
- Saves: 48, Fernando Rodney (2012)

== Team salaries ==
Opening Day payrolls for 25-man roster (since 1998):

Opening Day Salary
Year	Salary
2022	$78,245,400
2021	$70,836,327
2020	$28,290,689
2019	$52,150,800
2018	$67,482,000
2017	$69,982,520
2016	$57,097,310
2015	$73,649,584
2014	$82,035,490
2013	$51,903,072
2012	$64,173,500
2011	$41,053,571
2010	$71,924,471
2009	$63,313,034
2008	$43,820,597
2007	$24,123,500
2006	$35,417,967
2005	$29,679,067
2004	$29,556,667
2003	$19,630,000
2002	$34,380,000
2001	$56,980,000
2000	$64,407,910
1999	$37,812,500
1998	$25,317,500

== See also ==
- Baseball awards
- List of MLB awards
- Tampa Bay Rays all-time roster
- Ted Williams Museum and Hitters Hall of Fame (including Tampa Bay Rays exhibit)

== Notes ==
Awards and achievements
Preceded by Boston Red Sox; 2007	American League champions 2008	Succeeded by New York Yankees; 2009
Preceded by Houston Astros; 2019	American League champions 2020	Succeeded by Houston Astros; 2021–2022
Preceded by Toronto Blue Jays; 2025	American League champions 2026	Succeeded by Incumbent
