= 2026 Tampa Bay Rays season =

Major League Baseball season

2026 Tampa Bay Rays
- American League champions American League East champions
- League: American League
- Division: East
- Ballpark: Tropicana Field
- City: St. Petersburg, Florida
- Record: 98–64 (.605)
- League place: 1st
- Owner: Patrick Zalupski
- President of baseball operations: Erik Neander
- Manager: Kevin Cash
- Television: MLB Local Media
- Radio: Tampa Bay Rays Radio Network (English); WQBN (Spanish)

The 2026 Tampa Bay Rays season was the 29th season of the Tampa Bay Rays franchise, as members of Major League Baseball's American League East Division. It was the Rays' first season under the ownership of Patrick Zalupski. The Rays returned to Tropicana Field in 2026 after spending one year away in 2025 at George M. Steinbrenner Field due to storm damage to Tropicana Field caused by Hurricane Milton. Tampa Bay gradually improved upon their fourth-place record 77-85 from the previous year. The season was the third time the Rays won the American League Pennant, en route to the 2026 World Series against the top-seeded Milwaukee Brewers. The season ended with the Rays receiving their third consecutive World Series loss in franchise history, falling to the Brewers in five games.

On August 24, the Rays won their 78th game, guaranteeing a better total than their 77–85 record from last year following a 4–1 victory over the Detroit Tigers. The Rays then became the first team to clinch a playoff berth in 2026 on September 11 after third baseman Junior Caminero hit a walk-off two-run home run against the Houston Astros for a 3–1 victory. On September 22, the Rays were victorious against the New York Yankees with a score of 6–1 to clinch their first division title since 2021, and their fifth in franchise history. In the American League Division Series, they swept their divisional rival Yankees in three games to advance to the American League Championship Series for the first time since 2020. They then faced the Cleveland Guardians in a best-of-seven series, winning four games to two to advance for the third time to the World Series. In the 2026 World Series, the Rays lost in five games to the Milwaukee Brewers.

On August 28, Hillsborough County approved funding for the proposed new stadium in Tampa, which is set to open in time for the 2029 season.

== Season standings ==
=== American League East ===
AL East
Team	W	L	Pct.	GB	Home	Road
Tampa Bay Rays	98	64	.605	—	55‍–‍26	43‍–‍38
New York Yankees	93	68	.578	4½	46‍–‍34	47‍–‍34
Boston Red Sox	87	75	.537	11	41‍–‍40	46‍–‍35
Baltimore Orioles	79	82	.491	18½	39‍–‍42	40‍–‍40
Toronto Blue Jays	79	83	.488	19	42‍–‍39	37‍–‍44

=== American League Wild Card ===
Division leaders
Team	W	L	Pct.
Tampa Bay Rays	98	64	.605
Cleveland Guardians	85	77	.525
Houston Astros	81	81	.500

Wild Card teams (Top 3 teams qualify for postseason)
Team	W	L	Pct.	GB
New York Yankees	93	68	.578	+9½
Boston Red Sox	87	75	.537	+3
Chicago White Sox	84	78	.519	—
Texas Rangers	80	82	.494	4
Baltimore Orioles	79	82	.491	4½
Toronto Blue Jays	79	83	.488	5
Minnesota Twins	77	85	.475	7
Detroit Tigers	76	86	.469	8
Seattle Mariners	76	86	.469	8
Kansas City Royals	69	93	.426	15
Athletics	64	98	.395	20
Los Angeles Angels	62	100	.383	22

== Season summary ==
=== Transactions ===
==== March ====
- March 25: Placed RHP Steven Wilson on the 60-day IL. Placed RHP Edwin Uceta on the 15-day IL. Selected contract of LHP Cam Booser from Durham Bulls. Optioned Booser to Durham Bulls.
- March 26: Signed free agents SS Jeison Araujo and RHP Roberto Mendoza to minor league contracts.
- March 27: Signed free agents RHP Angel Perez and SS Erison Rojas to minor league contracts.

==== June ====
- June 23: Traded a Player to be Named Later (later named as RHP Trey Pooser) to St. Louis for RHP Chris Roycroft.

==== August ====
- August 2: Traded RHP Gary Gill Hill, OF Aidan Smith, and SS Émilien Pitre to the New York Mets for RHP Freddy Peralta.
- August 2: Traded C Hunter Feduccia and RHP Jacob Kmatz to the Los Angeles Dodgers for CF Jack Suwinski and International Bonus Pool space.
- August 3: Traded 3B Brayden Taylor, SS Adrian Santana and RHP Jacob Kisting to Miami for C Liam Hicks.

== Game log ==
=== Regular season ===
Legend
	Rays win
	Rays loss
	Postponement
	Clinched playoff spot
	Clinched division
**Bold**	Rays team member

2026 Game Log: 98–64 (Home: 55–26; Away: 43–38)
March/April: 18–12 (Home: 8–4; Away: 10–8)

#	Date	Opponent	Score	Win	Loss	Save	Venue	Attendance	Record	Streak/ Box
1	March 26	@ Cardinals	7–9	O'Brien (1–0)	**Cleavinger** (0–1)	Stanek (1)	Busch Stadium	45,037	0–1	L1
2	March 28	@ Cardinals	5–6 (10)	Stanek (1–0)	**Jax** (0–1)	—	Busch Stadium	25,951	0–2	L2
3	March 29	@ Cardinals	11–7	**Matz** (1–0)	May (0–1)	—	Busch Stadium	27,653	1–2	W1
4	March 30	@ Brewers	3–2	**Cleavinger** (1–0)	Megill (0–1)	**Kelly** (1)	American Family Field	20,022	2–2	W2
5	March 31	@ Brewers	2–6	Woodruff (1–0)	**McClanahan** (0–1)	—	American Family Field	20,010	2–3	L1
6	April 1	@ Brewers	2–8	Ashby (2–0)	**Jax** (0–2)	—	American Family Field	21,949	2–4	L2
7	April 3	@ Twins	4–10	Funderburk (1–1)	**Kelly** (0–1)	—	Target Field	36,042	2–5	L3
8	April 4	@ Twins	7–1	**Matz** (2–0)	Abel (0–2)	—	Target Field	15,256	3–5	W1
9	April 5	@ Twins	4–1 (10)	**Baker** (1–0)	Topa (0–1)	**Kelly** (2)	Target Field	13,069	4–5	W2
10	April 6	Cubs	6–4	**Kelly** (1–1)	Taillon (0–1)	**Baker** (1)	**Tropicana Field**	25,114	5–5	W3
11	April 7	Cubs	2–9	Assad (1–0)	**Englert** (0–1)	—	**Tropicana Field**	21,377	5–6	L1
12	April 8	Cubs	2–6	Rea (1–0)	**Boyle** (0–1)	—	**Tropicana Field**	20,483	5–7	L2
13	April 10	Yankees	5–3	**Matz** (3–0)	Gil (0–1)	**Baker** (2)	**Tropicana Field**	20,511	6–7	W1
14	April 11	Yankees	5–4 (10)	**Sulser** (1–0)	Bednar (0–2)	—	**Tropicana Field**	21,620	7–7	W2
15	April 12	Yankees	5–4	**Rasmussen** (1–0)	Schlittler (2–1)	**Englert** (1)	**Tropicana Field**	20,796	8–7	W3
16	April 14	@ White Sox	8–5	**McClanahan** (1–1)	Schultz (0–1)	**Baker** (3)	Rate Field	14,648	9–7	W4
17	April 15	@ White Sox	8–3	**Scholtens** (1–0)	Burke (0–2)	—	Rate Field	10,193	10–7	W5
18	April 16	@ White Sox	5–3	**Kelly** (2–1)	Domínguez (1–2)	**Baker** (4)	Rate Field	10,128	11–7	W6
19	April 17	@ Pirates	1–5	Chandler (1–1)	**Martinez** (0–1)	—	PNC Park	24,198	11–8	L1
20	April 18	@ Pirates	8–7 (13)	**Jax** (1–2)	Ramírez (2–1)	**Gómez** (1)	PNC Park	37,773	12–8	W1
21	April 19	@ Pirates	3–6	Keller (2–1)	**McClanahan** (1–2)	—	PNC Park	13,439	12–9	L1
22	April 20	Reds	1–6	Lowder (3–1)	**Scholtens** (1–1)	—	**Tropicana Field**	15,962	12–10	L2
23	April 21	Reds	6–12	Burns (2–1)	**Matz** (3–1)	—	**Tropicana Field**	14,749	12–11	L3
24	April 22	Reds	6–1	**Martinez** (1–1)	Williamson (2–2)	—	**Tropicana Field**	15,546	13–11	W1
25	April 24	Twins	6–2	**Rasmussen** (2–0)	Bradley (3–1)	**Baker** (5)	**Tropicana Field**	14,476	14–11	W2
26	April 25	Twins	6–1	**McClanahan** (2–2)	Ober (2–1)	―	**Tropicana Field**	17,014	15–11	W3
27	April 26	Twins	4–2	**Scholtens** (2–1)	Woods Richardson (0–4)	**Baker** (6)	**Tropicana Field**	17,618	16–11	W4
28	April 27	@ Guardians	3–2	**Matz** (4–1)	Gaddis (0–1)	**Baker** (7)	Progressive Field	18,029	17–11	W5
29	April 28	@ Guardians	1–0	**Martinez** (2–1)	Bibee (0–4)	**Sulser** (1)	Progressive Field	16,213	18–11	W6
30	April 29	@ Guardians	1–3	Williams (5–1)	**Rasmussen** (2–1)	Smith (7)	Progressive Field	14,196	18–12	L1

May: 18–8 (Home: 13–2; Away: 5–6)

#	Date	Opponent	Score	Win	Loss	Save	Stadium	Attendance	Record	Streak/ Box
31	May 1	Giants	3–0	**McClanahan** (3–2)	Ray (2–4)	**Baker** (8)	**Tropicana Field**	13,330	19–12	W1
32	May 2	Giants	5–1	**Scholtens** (3–1)	Roupp (5–2	—	**Tropicana Field**	21,973	20–12	W2
33	May 3	Giants	2–1 (10)	**Seymour** (1–0)	Kilian (1–1)	—	**Tropicana Field**	20,108	21–12	W3
34	May 4	Blue Jays	5–1	**Martinez** (3–1)	Lauer (1–4)	**Baker** (9)	**Tropicana Field**	11,263	22–12	W4
35	May 5	Blue Jays	4–3	**Legumina** (1–1)	Rogers (1–2)	**Sulser** (2)	**Tropicana Field**	11,217	23–12	W5
36	May 6	Blue Jays	3–0	**McClanahan** (4–2)	Corbin (1–1)	**Seymour** (1)	**Tropicana Field**	11,275	24–12	W6
37	May 7	@ Red Sox	8–4	**Bigge** (1–0)	Bennett (0–1)	—	Fenway Park	33,961	25–12	W7
38	May 8	@ Red Sox	0–2	Early (3–2)	**Scholtens** (3–2)	Chapman (8)	Fenway Park	35,052	25–13	L1
―	May 9	@ Red Sox	Postponed due to rain. Makeup date July 17.							
39	May 10	@ Red Sox	4–1	**Martinez** (4–1)	Tolle (1–2)	**Baker** (10)	Fenway Park	33,489	26–13	W1
40	May 11	@ Blue Jays	8–5	**Rasmussen** (3–1)	Gausman (2–3)	**Baker** (11)	Rogers Centre	39,336	27–13	W2
41	May 12	@ Blue Jays	7–6 (10)	**Seymour** (2–0)	Fisher (2–1)	**Cleavinger** (1)	Rogers Centre	41,265	28–13	W3
42	May 13	@ Blue Jays	3–5 (10)	Hoffman (2–2)	**Brooks** (0–1)	—	Rogers Centre	40,119	28–14	L1
43	May 15	Marlins	7–2	**Scholtens** (4–2)	Junk (2–4)	—	**Tropicana Field**	14,919	29–14	W1
44	May 16	Marlins	5–10 (10)	Fairbanks (1–2)	**Bigge** (1–1)	—	**Tropicana Field**	19,673	29–15	L1
45	May 17	Marlins	6–3	**Rasmussen** (4–1)	Pérez (2–6)	**Baker** (12)	**Tropicana Field**	16,788	30–15	W1
46	May 18	Orioles	16–6	**McClanahan** (5–2)	Rogers (2–5)	—	**Tropicana Field**	13,633	31–15	W2
47	May 19	Orioles	4–1	**Kelly** (3–1)	Bradish (2–6)	**Baker** (13)	**Tropicana Field**	13,956	32–15	W3
48	May 20	Orioles	5–3	**Scholtens** (5–2)	Nunez (2–1)	**Seymour** (2)	**Tropicana Field**	11,846	33–15	W4
49	May 22	@ Yankees	4–2	**Seymour** (3–0)	Hill (0–2)	**Baker** (14)	Yankee Stadium	41,358	34–15	W5
―	May 23	@ Yankees	Postponed due to rain. Makeup date September 22.							
50	May 24	@ Yankees	0–2	Hill (1–2)	**Kelly** (3–2)	—	Yankee Stadium	41,396	34–16	L1
51	May 25	@ Orioles	7–9 (13)	Enns (3–0)	**Scholtens** (5–3)	—	Camden Yards	22,388	34–17	L2
52	May 26	@ Orioles	1–6	Baz (2–5)	**Jax** (1–3)	—	Camden Yards	11,878	34–18	L3
53	May 27	@ Orioles	2–11	Gibson (1–0)	**Matz** (4–2)	—	Camden Yards	16,317	34–19	L4
54	May 29	Angels	8–5	**Martinez** (5–1)	Zeferjahn (2–3)	**Baker** (15)	**Tropicana Field**	18,706	35–19	W1
55	May 30	Angels	3–14	Detmers (2–5)	**Rasmussen** (4–2)	—	**Tropicana Field**	22,480	35–20	L1
56	May 31	Angels	5–2	**McClanahan** (6–2)	Kochanowicz (2–4)	**Baker** (16)	**Tropicana Field**	16,589	36–20	W1

June: 13–13 (Home: 10–6; Away: 3–7)

#	Date	Opponent	Score	Win	Loss	Save	Stadium	Attendance	Record	Streak/ Box
57	June 1	Tigers	9–10	Holton (1–4)	**Jax** (1–4)	Vest (1)	**Tropicana Field**	13,695	36–21	L1
58	June 2	Tigers	0–8	Flaherty (1–7)	**Matz** (4–3)	De Jesus (1)	**Tropicana Field**	14,010	36–22	L2
59	June 3	Tigers	2–7	Melton (2–0)	**Martinez** (5–2)	—	**Tropicana Field**	12,585	36–23	L3
60	June 5	@ Marlins	6–0	**Rasmussen** (5–2)	Gusto (0–1)	—	LoanDepot Park	10,312	37–23	W1
61	June 6	@ Marlins	3–4	King (3–1)	**McClanahan** (6–3)	Zuber (1)	LoanDepot Park	12,443	37–24	L1
62	June 7	@ Marlins	1–4	Alcántara (5–4)	**Cleavinger** (1–2)	Bender (2)	LoanDepot Park	14,525	37–25	L2
63	June 8	Red Sox	3–1	**Legumina** (2–1)	Early (5–4)	**Baker** (17)	**Tropicana Field**	14,579	38–25	W1
64	June 9	Red Sox	4–3	**Martinez** (6–2)	Tolle (3–3)	**Baker** (18)	**Tropicana Field**	15,503	39–25	W2
65	June 10	Red Sox	7–5	**Rasmussen** (6–2)	Bennett (1–2)	**Cleavinger** (2)	**Tropicana Field**	16,504	40–25	W3
66	June 12	@ Angels	3–4	Aldegheri (2–1)	**McClanahan** (6–4)	Zeferjahn (2)	Angel Stadium	37,023	40–26	L1
67	June 13	@ Angels	0–8	Soriano (8–4)	**Jax** (1–5)	—	Angel Stadium	34,030	40–27	L2
68	June 14	@ Angels	8–3	**Kelly** (4–2)	Bachman (1–1)	—	Angel Stadium	34,048	41–27	W1
69	June 15	@ Dodgers	3–4	Hurt (2–1)	**Matz** (4–4)	Scott (8)	Dodger Stadium	53,911	41–28	L1
70	June 16	@ Dodgers	0–1	Wrobleski (8–2)	**Rasmussen** (6–3)	Scott (9)	Dodger Stadium	49,070	41–29	L2
71	June 17	@ Dodgers	4–5	Ohtani (7–2)	**Kelly** (4–3)	Vesia (3)	Dodger Stadium	50,705	41–30	L3
72	June 19	Nationals	5–2	**Jax** (2–5)	Mikolas (2–6)	**Baker** (19)	**Tropicana Field**	17,134	42–30	W1
73	June 20	Nationals	3–4	Parker (3–3)	**Seymour** (3–1)	Beeter (5)	**Tropicana Field**	20,996	42–31	L1
74	June 21	Nationals	4–3	**Cleavinger** (2–2)	Ribalta (0–1)	**Kelly** (3)	**Tropicana Field**	21,054	43–31	W1
75	June 22	Royals	1–2	Wacha (5–5)	**Rasmussen** (6–4)	Lange (6)	**Tropicana Field**	11,298	43–32	L1
76	June 23	Royals	5–12	Avila (3–3)	**McClanahan** (6–5)	—	**Tropicana Field**	11,171	43–33	L2
77	June 24	Royals	5–3	**Jax** (3–5)	Cameron (4–5)	**Baker** (20)	**Tropicana Field**	11,857	44–33	W1
78	June 25	Royals	13–2	**Seymour** (4–1)	Lugo (3–5)	—	**Tropicana Field**	14,276	45–33	W2
79	June 26	Diamondbacks	6–1	**Martinez** (7–2)	Gallen (3–7)	—	**Tropicana Field**	12,972	46–33	W3
80	June 27	Diamondbacks	4–2	**Grove** (1–0)	Cabrera (0–1)	**Baker** (21)	**Tropicana Field**	17,562	47–33	W4
81	June 28	Diamondbacks	5–1	**Rasmussen** (7–4)	Kelly (5–8)	—	**Tropicana Field**	17,195	48–33	W5
82	June 30	@ Royals	10–4	**Jax** (4–5)	Cameron (4–6)	—	Kauffman Stadium	15,014	49–33	W6

July: 15–12 (Home: 9–5; Away: 6–7)

#	Date	Opponent	Score	Win	Loss	Save	Stadium	Attendance	Record	Streak/ Box
83	July 1	@ Royals	4–0	**McClanahan** (7–5)	Lugo (3–6)	**Kelly** (4)	Kauffman Stadium	13,798	50–33	W7
84	July 2	@ Royals	5–2	**Seymour** (5–1)	Kolek (4–3)	**Baker** (22)	Kauffman Stadium	16,814	51–33	W8
85	July 3	@ Astros	3–1	**Kelly** (5–3)	Okert (1–1)	**Baker** (23)	Daikin Park	36,039	52–33	W9
86	July 4	@ Astros	8–10	Hader (3–0)	**Legumina** (2–2)	—	Daikin Park	37,457	52–34	L1
87	July 5	@ Astros	0–2	Lambert (7–5)	**Englert** (0–2)	Hader (9)	Daikin Park	29,003	52–35	L2
88	July 6	Yankees	1–5	Schlittler (9–5)	**Jax** (4–6)	—	**Tropicana Field**	18,129	52–36	L3
89	July 7	Yankees	6–4	**Seymour** (6–1)	Warren (7–4)	**Baker** (24)	**Tropicana Field**	18,115	53–36	W1
90	July 8	Yankees	3–0	**McClanahan** (8–5)	Cole (3–4)	**Baker** (25)	**Tropicana Field**	19,373	54–36	W2
91	July 9	Yankees	4–12	Yarbrough (1–0)	**Rasmussen** (7–5)	—	**Tropicana Field**	18,255	54–37	L1
92	July 10	Mariners	7–2	**Martinez** (8–2)	Castillo (3–8)	—	**Tropicana Field**	15,568	55–37	W1
93	July 11	Mariners	6–1	**Jax** (5–6)	Gilbert (7–6)	—	**Tropicana Field**	22,597	56–37	W2
94	July 12	Mariners	2–8	Ferrer (2–1)	**Seymour** (6–2)	—	**Tropicana Field**	24,297	56–38	L1
–	July 14	**96th All-Star Game in Philadelphia, PA**								
95	July 17 (1)	@ Red Sox	0–10	Bennett (5–3)	**Jax** (5–7)	Gamboa (1)	Fenway Park	36,774	56–39	L2
96	July 17 (2)	@ Red Sox	3–5	Weissert (2–2)	**Englert** (0–3)	Chapman (20)	Fenway Park	34,255	56–40	L3
97	July 18	@ Red Sox	6–7	Watson (1–0)	**Cleavinger** (2–3)	Chapman (21)	Fenway Park	33,077	56–41	L4
98	July 19	@ Red Sox	1–6	Gray (12–1)	**McClanahan** (8–6)	—	Fenway Park	32,950	56–42	L5
99	July 20	@ Blue Jays	7–1	**Martinez** (9–2)	Cease (6–5)	—	Rogers Centre	40,837	57–42	W1
100	July 21	@ Blue Jays	12–2	**Rasmussen** (8–5)	Gausman (4–9)	—	Rogers Centre	42,881	58–42	W2
101	July 22	@ Blue Jays	4–2	**Jax** (6–7)	Hoffman (5–7)	**Baker** (26)	Rogers Centre	42,841	59–42	W3
102	July 23	@ Blue Jays	1–3	Bieber (2–1)	**Seymour** (6–3)	Varland (21)	Rogers Centre	43,225	59–43	L1
103	July 24	Guardians	11–3	**McClanahan** (9–6)	Cantillo (8–6)	**Roycroft** (1)	**Tropicana Field**	19,099	60–43	W1
104	July 25	Guardians	3–0	**Martinez** (10–2)	Bibee (4–10)	**Baker** (27)	**Tropicana Field**	24,100	61–43	W2
105	July 26	Guardians	1–0	**Rasmussen** (9–5)	Messick (8–6)	**Baker** (28)	**Tropicana Field**	20,562	62–43	W3
106	July 28	Rangers	1–4	Quantrill (4–3)	**Jax** (6–8)	Latz (21)	**Tropicana Field**	14,502	62–44	L1
107	July 29	Rangers	3–0	**Seymour** (7–3)	Gore (6–9)	**Baker** (29)	**Tropicana Field**	14,200	63–44	W1
108	July 30	Rangers	3–2	**Cleavinger** (3–3)	Peoples (0–1)	**Baker** (30)	**Tropicana Field**	15,322	64–44	W2
109	July 31	White Sox	1–6	Fedde (6–6)	**Martinez** (10–3)	—	**Tropicana Field**	20,661	64–45	L1

August: 18–10 (Home: 6–7; Away: 12–3)

#	Date	Opponent	Score	Win	Loss	Save	Stadium	Attendance	Record	Streak/ Box
110	August 1	White Sox	1–0	**Rasmussen** (10–5)	Schultz (3–8)	**Baker** (31)	**Tropicana Field**	23,309	65–45	W1
111	August 2	White Sox	1–9	Kay (8–5)	**Jax** (6–9)	—	**Tropicana Field**	23,559	65–46	L1
112	August 3	@ Rockies	13–9	**Seymour** (8–3)	Lorenzen (3–10)	—	Coors Field	19,598	66–46	W1
113	August 4	@ Rockies	9–7 (11)	**Cleavinger** (4–3)	Frasso (0–1)	**Baker** (32)	Coors Field	23,071	67–46	W2
114	August 5	@ Rockies	4–0	**Martinez** (11–3)	Sugano (11–5)	—	Coors Field	21,100	68–46	W3
115	August 7	@ Mariners	2–1	**Rasmussen** (11–5)	Gilbert (8–7)	**Baker** (33)	T-Mobile Park	39,468	69–46	W4
116	August 8	@ Mariners	3–2	**Matz** (5–4)	Rucker (0–3)	**Baker** (34)	T-Mobile Park	41,351	70–46	W5
117	August 9	@ Mariners	4–1	**Seymour** (9–3)	Hancock (6–7)	**Matz** (1)	T-Mobile Park	35,839	71–46	W6
118	August 10	@ Athletics	10–6	**Roycroft** (1–0)	Suárez (1–4)	—	Sutter Health Park	7,427	72–46	W7
119	August 11	@ Athletics	12–4	**Martinez** (12–3)	Barnett (1–3)	—	Sutter Health Park	8,154	73–46	W8
120	August 12	@ Athletics	8–4	**Rasmussen** (12–5)	Perkins (2–9)	—	Sutter Health Park	8,287	74–46	W9
121	August 14	Orioles	5–7	Walker (1–0)	**Cleavinger** (4–4)	Sanders (2)	**Tropicana Field**	18,343	74–47	L1
122	August 15	Orioles	3–4 (10)	Kittredge (2–3)	**Baker** (1–1)	Sanders (3)	**Tropicana Field**	28,055	74–48	L2
123	August 16	Orioles	2–10	Rogers (8–8)	**Peralta** (5–10)	—	**Tropicana Field**	18,598	74–49	L3
124	August 17	Orioles	7–6	**Booser** (1–0)	Canó (2–3)	**Baker** (35)	**Tropicana Field**	10,159	75–49	W1
125	August 18	Blue Jays	5–10	Soriano (10–6)	**Martinez** (12–4)	—	**Tropicana Field**	12,387	75–50	L1
126	August 19	Blue Jays	7–6	**Rasmussen** (13–5)	Scherzer (1–6)	**Baker** (36)	**Tropicana Field**	13,015	76–50	W1
127	August 20	Blue Jays	1–5	Bieber (5–2)	**Seymour** (9–4)	—	**Tropicana Field**	12,857	76–51	L1
128	August 21	@ Orioles	3–5	Rogers (9–8)	**Peralta** (5–11)	Garcia (6)	Camden Yards	25,963	76–52	L2
129	August 22	@ Orioles	2–3 (10)	Garcia (5–1)	**Baker** (1–2)	—	Camden Yards	27,158	76–53	L3
130	August 23	@ Orioles	3–1	**Martinez** (13–4)	Baz (4–14)	**Baker** (37)	Camden Yards	27,745	77–53	W1
131	August 24	@ Tigers	4–1	**Rasmussen** (14–5)	Valdez (8–9)	**Baker** (38)	Comerica Park	23,265	78–53	W2
132	August 25	@ Tigers	1–4	Sommers (1–3)	**Seymour** (9–5)	Jansen (17)	Comerica Park	26,605	78–54	L1
133	August 26	@ Tigers	3–0	**Peralta** (6–11)	Melton (7–3)	**Wells** (5)	Comerica Park	21,482	79–54	W1
134	August 28	Padres	9–4	**McClanahan** (10–6)	Mize (5–8)	—	**Tropicana Field**	16,470	80–54	W2
135	August 29	Padres	7–6	**Kelly** (6–3)	Rodríguez (3–3)	**Baker** (39)	**Tropicana Field**	25,621	81–54	W3
136	August 30	Padres	5–4 (11)	**Wells** (3–2)	Morgan (2–1)	—	**Tropicana Field**	19,576	82–54	W4
137	August 31	Mets	2–3	Stock (1–3)	**Seymour** (9–6)	Senga (5)	**Tropicana Field**	13,618	82–55	L1

September: 16–9 (Home: 9–2; Away: 7–7)

#	Date	Opponent	Score	Win	Loss	Save	Stadium	Attendance	Record	Streak/ Box
138	September 1	Mets	6–2	**Peralta** (7–11)	Manaea (4–7)	—	**Tropicana Field**	16,850	83–55	W1
139	September 2	Mets	4–10	Núñez (1–0)	**Jax** (6–10)	—	**Tropicana Field**	14,431	83–56	L1
140	September 3	@ Rangers	0–6	Quantrill (7–5)	**McClanahan** (10–7)	—	Globe Life Field	26,507	83–57	L2
141	September 4	@ Rangers	7–6	**Martinez** (14–4)	Rocker (5–11)	**Wells** (6)	Globe Life Field	25,584	84–57	W1
142	September 5	@ Rangers	6–3 (10)	**Wells** (4–2)	Latz (3–2)	—	Globe Life Field	31,657	85–57	W2
143	September 6	@ Rangers	6–8	Williams (1–0)	**Matz** (5–5)	Junis (6)	Globe Life Field	33,285	85–58	L1
144	September 8	@ Braves	7–1	**Peralta** (8–11)	Smith-Shawver (0–2)	—	Truist Park	30,969	86–58	W1
145	September 9	@ Braves	7–2	**Jax** (7–10)	López (4–4)	—	Truist Park	30,969	87–58	W2
146	September 10	@ Braves	1–3	Fuentes (6–2)	**Kelly** (6–4)	Iglesias (32)	Truist Park	31,664	87–59	L1
147	September 11	Astros	3–1	**Baker** (2–2)	Abreu (6–4)	—	**Tropicana Field**	16,217	88–59	W1
148	September 12	Astros	3–2	**Wells** (5–2)	Lambert (8–9)	**Baker** (40)	**Tropicana Field**	24,642	89–59	W2
149	September 13	Astros	14–4	**Peralta** (9–11)	Wesneski (5–2)	—	**Tropicana Field**	18,718	90–59	W3
150	September 15	Athletics	2–1	**Baker** (3–2)	Alvarado (5–4)	—	**Tropicana Field**	16,102	91–59	W4
151	September 16	Athletics	4–3	**Martinez** (15–4)	Basso (1–3)	**Sulser** (3)	**Tropicana Field**	14,552	92–59	W5
152	September 17	Athletics	10–1	**Rasmussen** (15–5)	Springs (4–14)	—	**Tropicana Field**	12,305	93–59	W6
153	September 18	Red Sox	2–4	Suárez (8–4)	**Seymour** (9–7)	Miller (5)	**Tropicana Field**	23,342	93–60	L1
154	September 19	Red Sox	2–1	**Baker** (4–2)	Whitlock (7–2)	—	**Tropicana Field**	27,402	94–60	W1
155	September 20	Red Sox	5–1	**Jax** (8–10)	Sandoval (1–7)	—	**Tropicana Field**	24,654	95–60	W2
156	September 22 (1)	@ Yankees	0–2	Rodón (7–3)	**Martinez** (15–5)	Bednar (35)	Yankee Stadium	41,421	95–61	L1
157	September 22 (2)	@ Yankees	6–1	**Rasmussen** (16–5)	Fried (5–5)	—	Yankee Stadium	38,656	96–61	W1
158	September 23	@ Yankees	2–9	Cole (10–9)	**Englert** (0–4)	—	Yankee Stadium	42,238	96–62	L1
159	September 24	@ Yankees	4–6	Hanner (1–0)	**Matz** (5–6)	—	Yankee Stadium	44,136	96–63	L2
160	September 25	@ Phillies	2–0	**Peralta** (10–11)	Sánchez (18–7)	**Baker** (41)	Citizens Bank Park	40,133	97–63	W1
161	September 26	@ Phillies	12–1	**Matz** (6–6)	Nola (7–12)	—	Citizens Bank Park	43,076	98–63	W2
162	September 27	@ Phillies	3–7	Wheeler (14–5)	**Martinez** (15–6)	—	Citizens Bank Park	42,146	98–64	L1

== Postseason ==
=== Postseason game log ===
2026 Postseason Game Log
American League Division Series

#	Date	Opponent	Score	Win	Loss	Save	Location Attendance	Series
1	October 3	Yankees	1–0	Rasmussen (1–0)	Cole (0–1)	Baker (1)	Tropicana Field; 40,542	1–0
2	October 5	Yankees	5–2	Booser (1–0)	Schlittler (1–1)	Baker (2)	Tropicana Field; 40,226	2–0
3	October 7	@ Yankees	4–3	Seymour (1–0)	Fried (1–1)	Baker (3)	Yankee Stadium; 48,865	3–0

American League Championship Series

#	Date	Opponent	Score	Win	Loss	Save	Location Attendance	Series
1	October 12	Guardians	3–7	Gaddis (1–0)	Wells (0–1)	–	Tropicana Field; 35,361	0–1
2	October 13	Guardians	3–1	Peralta (1–0)	Messick (0–2)	Baker (4)	Tropicana Field; 32,125	1–1
3	October 15	@ Guardians	2–3	Williams (2–0)	Jax (0–1)	Smith (2)	Progressive Field; 30,101	1–2
―	October 16	@ Guardians	Postponed due to rain. Makeup date October 17.					
4	October 17	@ Guardians	7–3	Martinez (1–0)	Espino (0–1)	—	Progressive Field; 33,355	2–2
5	October 18	@ Guardians	3–1	Rasmussen (2–0)	Messick (0–3)	Baker (5)	Progressive Field; 36,303	3–2
6	October 19	Guardians	7–3	Peralta (2–0)	Armstrong (0–1)	—	Tropicana Field; 40,230	4–2

World Series

#	Date	Opponent	Score	Win	Loss	Save	Location Attendance	Series
1	October 23	@ Brewers	2–3	Misiorowski (1–0)	Martinez (1–1)	Megill (5)	American Family Field; 43,250	0–1
2	October 24	@ Brewers	4–5	Uribe (1–0)	Wells (0–2)	Ashby (3)	American Family Field; 43,245	0–2
3	October 26	Brewers	1–10	Gasser (1–0)	Peralta (2–1)	—	Tropicana Field; 40,388	0–3
4	October 27	Brewers	4–3 (12)	Seymour (2–0)	Drohan (0–1)	—	Tropicana Field; 40,514	1–3
5	October 28	Brewers	1–4	Misiorowski (2–0)	Rasmussen (2–1)	—	Tropicana Field; 40,489	1–4

=== Postseason rosters ===
Playoff rosters
American League Division Series

- Pitchers: 22 Griffin Jax 28 Nick Martinez 32 Steven Matz 47 Bryan Baker 49 Kevin Kelly 51 Freddy Peralta 57 Drew Rasmussen 60 Garrett Cleavinger 61 Ian Seymour 62 Cam Booser 68 Tyler Wells 71 Cole Sulser
- Catchers: 34 Liam Hicks 40 Nick Fortes
- Infielders: 1 Richie Palacios 6 Taylor Walls 8 Jonathan Aranda 9 Jorge Mateo 13 Junior Caminero 15 Ben Williamson
- Outfielders: 14 Chandler Simpson 21 Jonny DeLuca 25 Victor Mesa Jr. 26 Ryan Vilade 31 Cedric Mullins
- Designated hitters: 2 Yandy Díaz

American League Championship Series

- Pitchers: 22 Griffin Jax 28 Nick Martinez 32 Steven Matz 47 Bryan Baker 49 Kevin Kelly 51 Freddy Peralta 57 Drew Rasmussen 61 Ian Seymour 62 Cam Booser 68 Tyler Wells 71 Cole Sulser 88 Brody Hopkins
- Catchers: 34 Liam Hicks 40 Nick Fortes
- Infielders: 1 Richie Palacios 6 Taylor Walls 8 Jonathan Aranda 9 Jorge Mateo 13 Junior Caminero 15 Ben Williamson
- Outfielders: 14 Chandler Simpson 21 Jonny DeLuca 25 Victor Mesa Jr. 26 Ryan Vilade 31 Cedric Mullins
- Designated hitters: 2 Yandy Díaz

World Series

- Pitchers: 2 Griffin Jax 28 Nick Martinez 32 Steven Matz 47 Bryan Baker 49 Kevin Kelly 51 Freddy Peralta 57 Drew Rasmussen 60 Garrett Cleavinger 61 Ian Seymour 62 Cam Booser 68 Tyler Wells 71 Cole Sulser
- Catchers: 34 Liam Hicks 40 Nick Fortes
- Infielders: 1 Richie Palacios 6 Taylor Walls 8 Jonathan Aranda 9 Jorge Mateo 13 Junior Caminero 15 Ben Williamson
- Outfielders: 14 Chandler Simpson 21 Jonny DeLuca 25 Victor Mesa Jr. 26 Ryan Vilade 31 Cedric Mullins
- Designated hitters: 2 Yandy Díaz

== Roster ==
2026 Tampa Bay Rays
Roster
Pitchers: 47 Bryan Baker; 43 Hunter Bigge; 62 Cam Booser; 36 Joe Boyle; 56 Aaron Brooks; 60 Garrett Cleavinger; 54 Alex Cook; 59 Mason Englert; 94 Yoendrys Gómez; 58 Michael Grove; 68 Jonathan Heasley; 88 Brody Hopkins; 22 Griffin Jax; 55 Ty Johnson; 49 Kevin Kelly; 46 Craig Kimbrel; 67 Casey Legumina; 70 Trevor Martin; 28 Nick Martinez; 32 Steven Matz; 18 Shane McClanahan; 51 Freddy Peralta; 57 Drew Rasmussen; 39 Manuel Rodríguez; 56 Chris Roycroft; 65 Jesse Scholtens; 61 Ian Seymour; 72 Chase Solesky; 71 Cole Sulser; 50 Andrew Wantz; 68 Tyler Wells; 41 Jake Woodford	Catchers: 9 Hunter Feduccia; 40 Nick Fortes; 34 Liam Hicks; 50 Kenny Piper; Infielders: 8 Jonathan Aranda; 13 Junior Caminero; 35 Oliver Dunn; 20 Nick Madrigal; 9 Jorge Mateo; 1 Richie Palacios; 6 Taylor Walls; 7 Carson Williams; 15 Ben Williamson	Outfielders: 21 Jonny DeLuca; 17 Jake Fraley; 25 Víctor Mesa Jr.; 31 Cedric Mullins; 14 Chandler Simpson; 20 Austin Slater; 26 Ryan Vilade; Other batters: 2 Yandy Díaz	Manager: 16 Kevin Cash; Coaches: 46 Will Bradley (assistant hitting); 10 Corey Dickerson (first base); 99 Misha Dworken (bullpen catcher); 41 Tomas Francisco (field coordinator); -- Kris Goodman (process and development); 52 Rick Knapp (assistant pitching and rehab); 27 Rodney Linares (bench); 33 Jorge Moncada (bullpen); 51 Chad Mottola (hitting); 23 Kyle Snyder (pitching); 30 Ozzie Timmons (assistant hitting); 96 Charlie Valerio (bullpen catcher); 4 Brady Williams (third base)

== Player stats ==
= Indicates team leader

= Indicates league leader

=== Batting ===
Note: G = Games played; AB = At bats; R = Runs scored; H = Hits; 2B = Doubles; 3B = Triples; HR = Home runs; RBI = Runs batted in; SB = Stolen bases; BB = Walks; AVG = Batting average; SLG = Slugging average

Player	G	AB	R	H	2B	3B	HR	RBI	SB	BB	AVG	SLG
Junior Caminero	162	616	100	170	25	1	42	101	3	79	.276	.524
Yandy Díaz	154	614	93	180	26	1	22	85	3	56	.293	.446
Jonathan Aranda	155	580	73	159	27	0	22	92	0	69	.274	.434
Chandler Simpson	151	571	66	175	16	6	0	38	46	48	.306	.356
Cedric Mullins	137	439	56	90	10	3	15	48	21	43	.205	.344
Taylor Walls	124	369	60	82	18	2	2	36	21	25	.222	.298
Jonny DeLuca	112	350	44	93	24	0	11	50	17	17	.266	.429
Richie Palacios	124	345	51	81	14	2	10	57	17	46	.235	.374
Nick Fortes	109	298	33	77	17	0	6	35	0	12	.258	.376
Ben Williamson	88	261	32	62	10	1	3	26	8	22	.238	.318
Ryan Vilade	96	245	28	60	8	2	11	43	3	26	.245	.429
Victor Mesa Jr.	79	235	37	61	8	3	14	34	9	23	.260	.498
Hunter Feduccia	60	141	15	33	7	1	2	12	0	14	.234	.340
Liam Hicks	41	125	12	36	7	0	4	20	0	16	.288	.440
Jake Fraley	31	88	6	19	7	0	2	5	3	9	.216	.364
Jorge Mateo	32	78	12	11	2	0	1	7	9	3	.141	.205
Carson Williams	16	37	7	4	1	0	1	6	0	2	.108	.216
Austin Slater	7	22	2	6	2	0	0	1	3	3	.273	.364
Oliver Dunn	9	11	4	1	0	0	0	1	0	1	.091	.091
Nick Madrigal	4	10	1	3	1	0	0	1	0	0	.300	.400
Kenny Piper	14	9	4	2	0	0	1	2	1	2	.222	.556
Totals	162	5444	736	1405	230	22	169	700	164	514	.258	.402

=== Pitching ===
Note: W = Wins; L = Losses; ERA = Earned run average; G = Games pitched; GS = Games started; SV = Saves; IP = Innings pitched; H = Hits allowed; R = Runs allowed; ER = Earned runs allowed; BB = Walks allowed; SO = Strikeouts

Player	W	L	ERA	G	GS	SV	IP	H	R	ER	BB	SO
Nick Martinez	15	6	3.10	31	31	0	180.0	171	62	62	26	109
Drew Rasmussen	16	5	2.67	30	30	0	172.0	125	53	51	32	174
Ian Seymour	9	7	4.21	47	16	2	132.2	114	67	62	36	158
Shane McClanahan	10	7	3.36	24	24	0	118.0	93	52	44	39	106
Griffin Jax	8	10	3.53	34	23	0	112.1	97	56	44	35	116
Steven Matz	6	6	5.49	36	11	1	80.1	74	50	49	25	61
Kevin Kelly	6	4	2.44	71	0	4	73.2	55	23	20	11	63
Bryan Baker	4	2	1.44	65	0	41	62.1	35	12	10	22	63
Casey Legumina	2	1	3.60	47	6	0	60.0	58	24	24	16	46
Cole Sulser	1	0	4.31	51	2	3	56.1	53	31	27	17	56
Freddy Peralta	5	2	3.25	10	10	0	55.1	41	20	20	15	43
Jesse Scholtens	5	3	4.34	12	2	0	47.2	49	25	23	15	37
Garrett Cleavinger	4	4	4.79	51	0	2	41.1	37	23	22	22	54
Cam Booser	1	0	1.98	42	0	0	41.0	25	10	9	6	45
Mason Englert	0	4	5.95	15	4	1	39.1	52	27	26	9	38
Hunter Bigge	1	1	6.98	18	0	0	19.1	14	17	15	14	14
Chris Roycroft	1	0	6.52	11	0	1	19.1	24	14	14	4	14
Joe Boyle	0	1	5.21	4	3	0	19.0	13	13	11	9	21
Craig Kimbrel	0	0	3.86	19	0	0	18.2	13	8	8	10	17
Tyler Wells	3	0	1.50	14	0	2	18.0	8	4	3	5	19
Yoendrys Gómez	0	0	6.23	9	0	1	17.1	19	13	12	10	13
Trevor Martin	0	0	3.97	6	0	0	11.1	14	8	5	4	7
Ty Johnson	0	0	3.52	8	0	0	7.2	7	3	3	4	11
Michael Grove	1	0	5.14	3	0	0	7.0	7	5	4	0	6
Manuel Rodríguez	0	0	2.70	6	0	0	6.2	6	3	2	8	10
Alex Cook	0	0	4.76	4	0	0	5.2	4	3	3	2	5
Brody Hopkins	0	0	5.06	6	0	0	5.1	2	3	3	6	7
Ben Williamson	0	0	3.60	5	0	0	5.0	5	2	2	1	0
Jonathan Heasley	0	0	11.25	1	0	0	4.0	8	5	5	0	2
Chase Solesky	0	0	6.00	1	0	0	3.0	6	2	2	1	4
Andrew Wantz	0	0	27.00	1	0	0	1.2	2	5	5	2	1
Jake Woodford	0	0	20.25	1	0	0	1.1	3	3	3	1	2
Aaron Brooks	0	1	81.00	1	0	0	0.1	1	4	3	2	0
Totals	98	64	3.71	162	162	58	1443.0	1235	650	594	409	1322

== Farm system ==
Level	Team	League	Manager
AAA	Durham Bulls	International League	Morgan Ensberg
AA	Montgomery Biscuits	Southern League	Kevin Boles
High-A	Bowling Green Hot Rods	South Atlantic League	Rafael Valenzuela
Low-A	Charleston RiverDogs	Carolina League	Danny Mendick
Rookie	FCL Rays	Florida Complex League	Sean Smedley
Foreign Rookie	DSL Tampa Bay	Dominican Summer League	Albert Lantigua
Foreign Rookie	DSL Rays	Dominican Summer League	Henry Lugo
