= 2026 American League Championship Series =

Team (Wins)	Managers	Season
Tampa Bay Rays (4)	Kevin Cash	98–64 (.605), GA: 4 1/2
Cleveland Guardians (2)	Stephen Vogt	85–77 (.525), GA: 1
- Dates: October 12–19
- MVP: Freddy Peralta (Tampa Bay)
- Umpires: Jordan Baker, Nestor Ceja, Chad Fairchild, Adam Hamari, Bill Miller (crew chief), Mark Ripperger, Carlos Torres

Broadcast
- Television: TBS (United States – English); UniMás (United States – Spanish); NHK BS (Japan – Japanese); J Sports 3 (Japan – Japanese); SPOTV (Japan – Japanese)
- TV announcers: Brian Anderson, Ron Darling, Jeff Francoeur, and Lauren Shehadi (TBS); Kazuhiro Takeda, Tsutomu Itō, Keita Ito, and Hiroshi Takebayashi (NHK BS)
- Radio: ESPN
- Radio announcers: Mike Couzens and Eduardo Pérez
- ALDS: Tampa Bay Rays over New York Yankees (3–0); Cleveland Guardians over Chicago White Sox (3–2)

The 2026 American League Championship Series (ALCS) was the best-of-seven playoff in Major League Baseball's 2026 postseason between the top-seeded Tampa Bay Rays and the second-seeded Cleveland Guardians for the American League (AL) pennant and the right to play in the 2026 World Series.

The series began on October 12 with a potential Game 7 scheduled for October 20. TBS and UniMás televised all games in the United States, with streaming on HBO Max and Vix. Tampa Bay won after six games 4-2, with Freddy Peralta being named the ALCS MVP, having won both the 2nd and 6th game. With this win, the Rays advanced to their first World Series since 2020 and would go on to lose to the Milwaukee Brewers in five games.

== Background ==
The Tampa Bay Rays (98–64) qualified for the postseason on September 11 after missing out in 2024 and 2025 and clinched the American League East division, a first-round bye, and home-field advantage throughout the AL playoffs with a doubleheader win over the New York Yankees on September 22 for the fourth time (2008, 2020, 2021). In the Division Series, they swept their divisional rival Yankees in three games to advance to the League Championship Series (LCS) for the first time since 2020. The Rays are attempting to win their third American League pennant, after wins in 2008 and 2020.

The Cleveland Guardians (85–77) qualified for the postseason on September 24; clinched their third consecutive American League Central division title (2024–2026) and first-round bye as the second seed on September 26. In the Division Series, they defeated their divisional rival and sixth-seeded Chicago White Sox in five games after being down 0–2 in the series. The Guardians returned to the League Championship Series for the second time in three years (2024, 2026), and seventh overall. The Guardians are attempting to win their seventh American League pennant and return to the World Series for the first time since 2016.

Tampa Bay won the season series against Cleveland, 5–1. This series will mark the third postseason meeting between the two teams, with the teams splitting the two previous match-ups (Tampa Bay won the 2013 AL Wild Card Game and Cleveland won the 2022 AL Wild Card Series).

== Summary ==
Tampa Bay won the series, 4–2.

Game	Date	Score	Location	Time	Attendance
1	October 12	Cleveland Guardians – 7, Tampa Bay Rays – 3	Tropicana Field	2:57	35,361
2	October 13	Cleveland Guardians – 1, Tampa Bay Rays – 3	Tropicana Field	2:42	32,125
3	October 15	Tampa Bay Rays – 2, Cleveland Guardians – 3	Progressive Field	2:28	30,101
4	October 17‡	Tampa Bay Rays – 7, Cleveland Guardians – 3	Progressive Field	3:10	33,355
5	October 18‡	Tampa Bay Rays – 3, Cleveland Guardians – 1	Progressive Field	2:50	36,303
6	October 19	Cleveland Guardians – 3, Tampa Bay Rays – 7	Tropicana Field	2:55	40,230

‡ Game 4 was originally scheduled for October 16, and Game 5 was originally scheduled for October 17.

== Game summaries ==
=== Game 1 ===
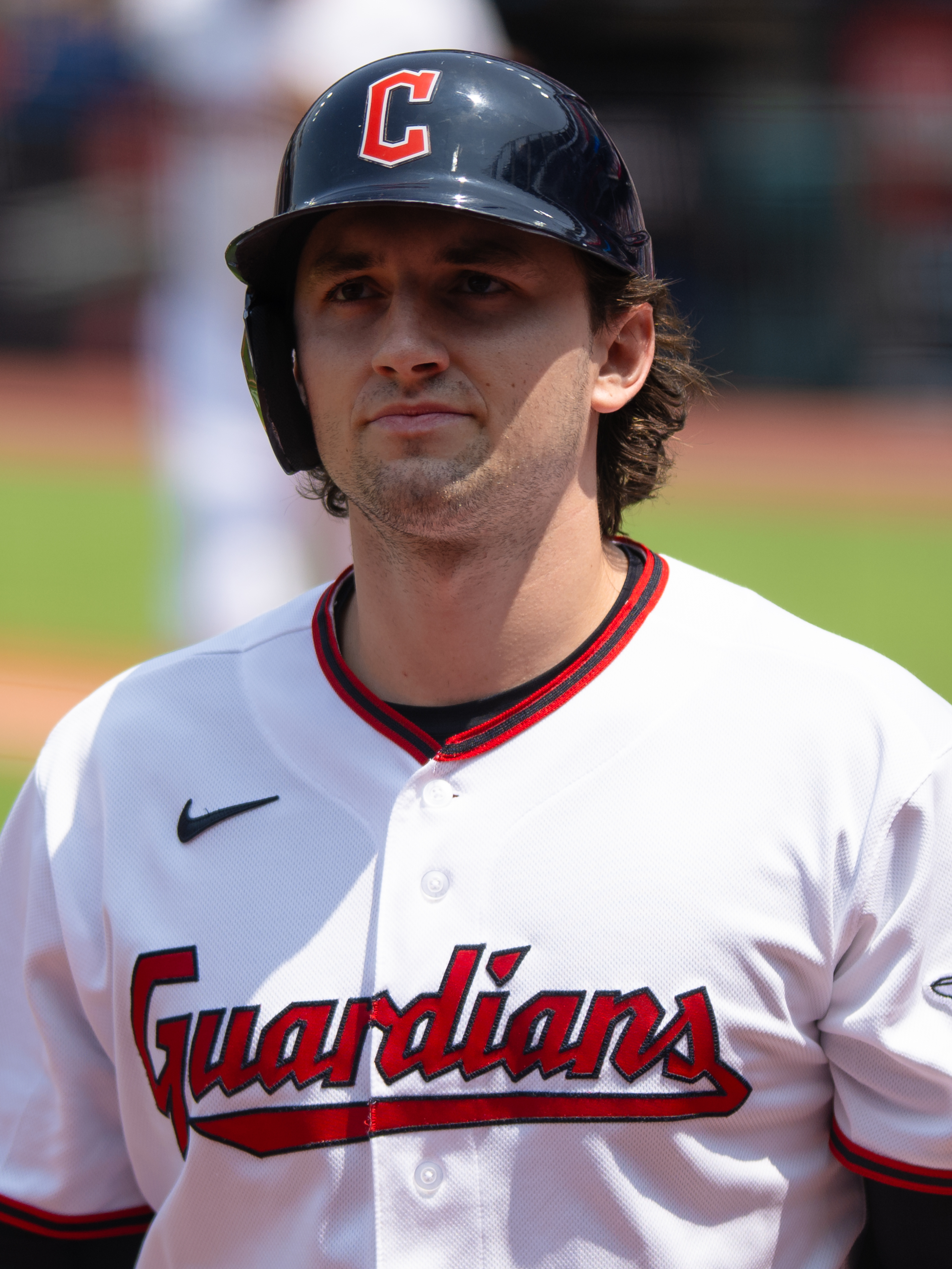
Chase DeLauter went 3-for-4, including a solo home run and a double in Game 1.

October 12, 2026 8:08 pm (EDT) at Tropicana Field in St. Petersburg, Florida 72 °F (22 °C), Dome
Team	1	2	3	4	5	6	7	8	9	R	H	E
Cleveland	0	0	0	0	0	1	1	2	3	7	14	0
Tampa Bay	2	0	0	0	0	0	0	1	0	3	7	0
WP: Hunter Gaddis (1–0) LP: Tyler Wells (0–1); Home runs: CLE: Chase DeLauter (1), Patrick Bailey (1); TB: Cedric Mullins (1); Attendance: 35,361; Boxscore

The Rays scored first in the bottom of the first inning, plating a pair of runs on consecutive RBI singles from Junior Caminero and Jonny DeLuca. Foster Griffin gave Cleveland four innings, scattering five hits and two runs while punching out three.

The Guardians broke through in the top of the sixth when Chase DeLauter led off with a solo home run to reduce the deficit to 2–1. Cleveland drew even in the seventh inning on another leadoff solo home run, this time off the bat of catcher Patrick Bailey against Drew Rasmussen, who pitched six innings while yielding eight hits and two runs with seven strikeouts.

Cleveland took a 4–2 lead in the top of the eighth inning when Nathaniel Lowe lined an RBI single to score both José Ramírez and DeLauter. The Rays answered in the bottom of the eighth when Cedric Mullins led off with a solo home run to make it a one-run game at 4–3.

The Guardians put the game out of reach in the top of the ninth. Ramírez delivered an RBI single to drive in Ángel Martínez, and Jo Adell followed with a clutch two-run double to stretch the advantage to 7–3. Cade Smith pitched in the bottom of the ninth, securing Game 1 and giving Cleveland a 1–0 series lead.

=== Game 2 ===
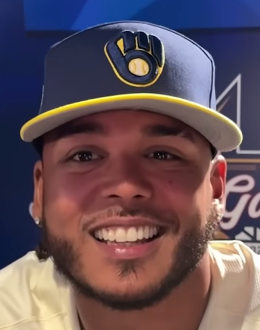
Freddy Peralta pitched six innings for the Rays, giving up no runs, while striking out six to even the series at one game each.

October 13, 2026 8:08 pm (EDT) at Tropicana Field in St. Petersburg, Florida 72 °F (22 °C), Dome
Team	1	2	3	4	5	6	7	8	9	R	H	E
Cleveland	0	0	0	0	0	0	1	0	0	1	6	1
Tampa Bay	0	0	0	3	0	0	0	0	X	3	7	0
WP: Freddy Peralta (1–0) LP: Parker Messick (0–1) Sv: Bryan Baker (1); Attendance: 32,125; Boxscore

The Rays scored the first three runs in the bottom of the fourth after Ben Williamson reached on a fielding error by José Ramírez, which allowed Víctor Mesa Jr. to score from third and set up a Liam Hicks two-run single. Parker Messick pitched five innings, allowing six hits and three unearned runs, while striking out three batters, and was the losing pitcher. Freddy Peralta pitched six innings, allowing four hits while striking out six batters, and ended up getting the win for the Rays. In the top of the seventh, Chase DeLauter hit an RBI double, scoring Patrick Bailey, and cutting the Guardians' deficit to 3–1.

Bryan Baker pitched a scoreless ninth inning for the save and evened the series up for the Rays at one game apiece.

=== Game 3 ===
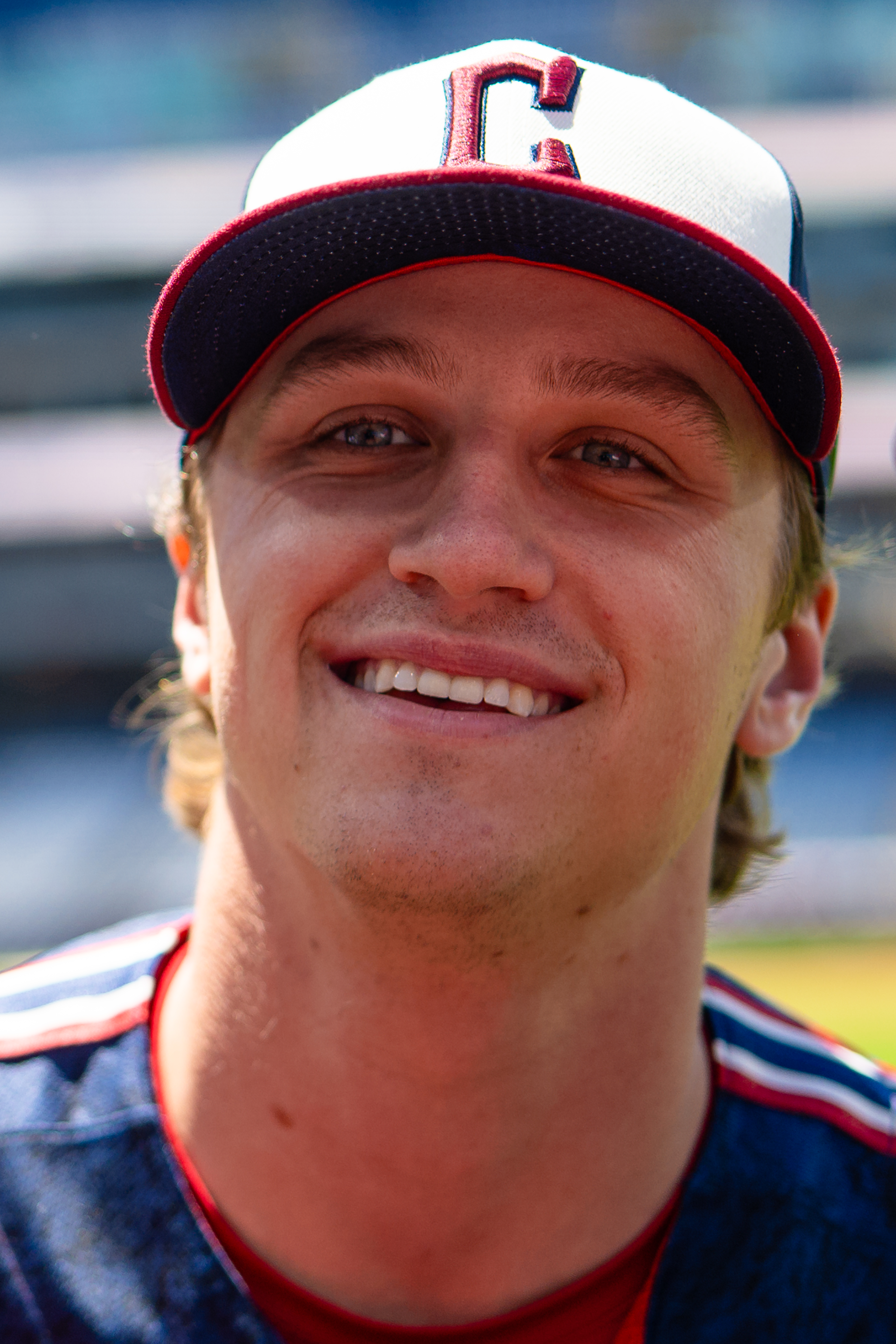
Petey Halpin hit his first career postseason home run, which gave the Guardians a 2–1 series lead.

October 15, 2026 1:10 pm (EDT) at Progressive Field in Cleveland, Ohio 62 °F (17 °C), Sunny
Team	1	2	3	4	5	6	7	8	9	R	H	E
Tampa Bay	0	0	0	2	0	0	0	0	0	2	3	0
Cleveland	0	1	0	0	2	0	0	0	X	3	6	0
WP: Gavin Williams (1–0) LP: Griffin Jax (0–1) Sv: Cade Smith (1); Home runs: TB: None; CLE: Petey Halpin (1); Attendance: 30,101; Boxscore

Game 3 was originally scheduled for a 6 p.m. EDT start but was moved forward five hours earlier due to forecasts of rain in Cleveland.

The Guardians scored first in the bottom of the second inning when Nathaniel Lowe ripped an RBI double to score Jo Adell, putting the hosts ahead 1–0. However, the Tampa Bay Rays answered in the top of the fourth, grabbing a 2–1 advantage courtesy of a clutch two-run triple by Chandler Simpson.

Cleveland quickly wrestled the momentum back in the fifth. Petey Halpin launched a go-ahead, two-run home run off Rays starter Griffin Jax, turning a deficit into a 3–2 Guardians lead. That blast stood up as the game-deciding blow. Jax absorbed the loss after laboring through four innings, charged with three runs on five hits while walking two and striking out two.

Meanwhile, Gavin Williams earned the victory for Cleveland with a dominant performance, limiting Tampa Bay to just two hits and two runs over five stellar frames while racking up nine strikeouts. Cade Smith came in for a four-out save for the Guardians and helped them to a 2–1 series lead.

=== Game 4 ===
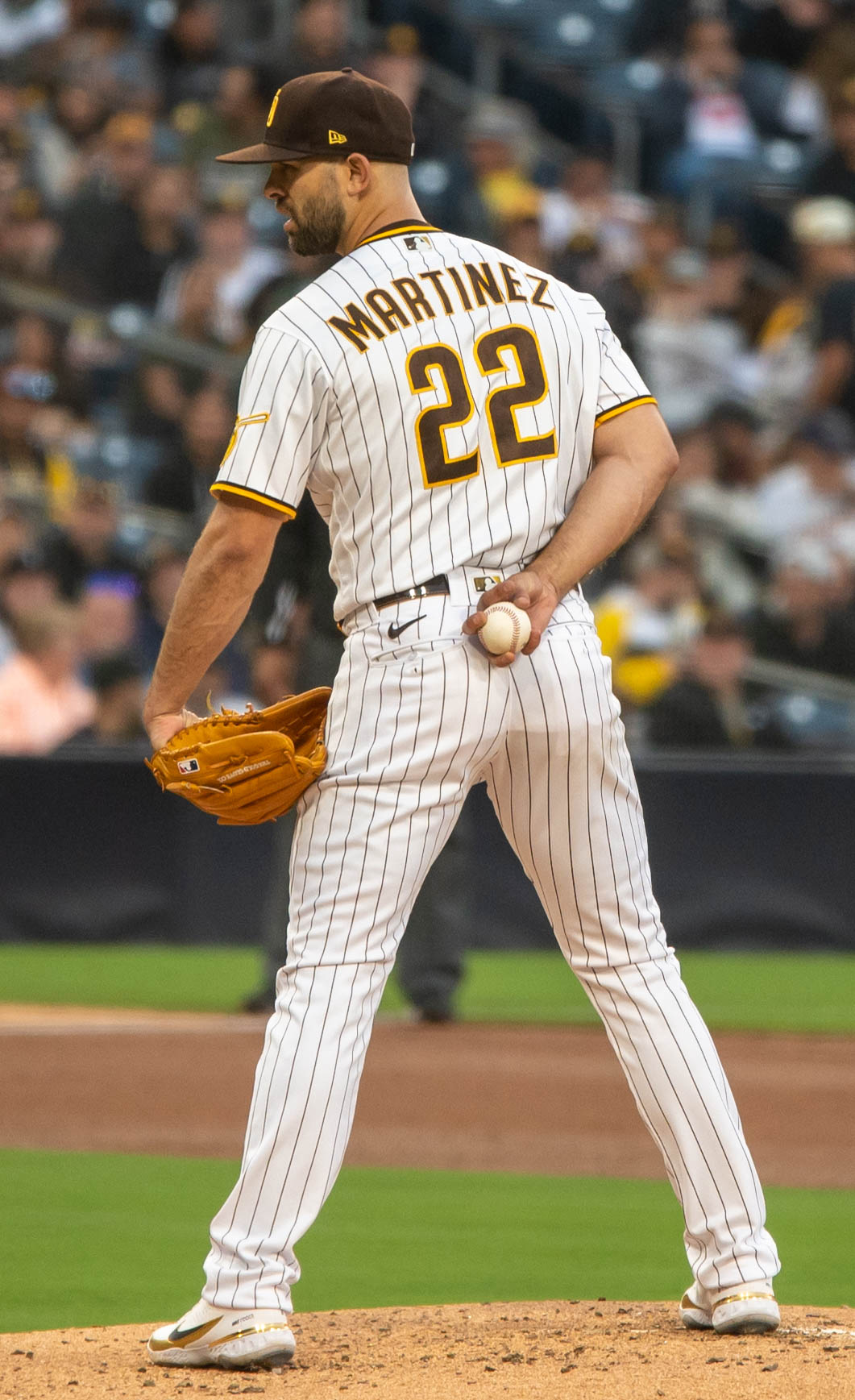
Nick Martinez pitched 5 1/3 innings for the Rays, giving up one run, while striking out three to even the series at two games each.

October 17, 2026 8:08 pm (EDT) at Progressive Field in Cleveland, Ohio 46 °F (8 °C), Partly Cloudy
Team	1	2	3	4	5	6	7	8	9	R	H	E
Tampa Bay	0	0	1	0	0	1	3	0	2	7	11	0
Cleveland	1	0	0	0	0	0	2	0	0	3	8	2
WP: Nick Martinez (1–0) LP: Daniel Espino (0–1); Home runs: TB: Yandy Díaz (1); CLE: Travis Bazzana (1); Attendance: 33,355; Boxscore

Game 4 of the series, originally scheduled for October 16 at 8:00 p.m. EDT, was postponed due to rainy conditions in Cleveland.

When Game 4 began, the Guardians struck first in the home half of the first. Chase DeLauter delivered an RBI single off Nick Martinez to stake Cleveland to an early 1–0 advantage.

The Rays punched back in the third. Jonathan Aranda came through with an RBI single off Foster Griffin, knotting the score at 1–1. It developed into a gripping pitching chess match as Martinez settled into a groove, firing 5 1/3 stellar innings where he scattered just two hits and a single run while fanning three. But Tampa Bay broke through in the sixth when Junior Caminero laced an RBI double, putting the visitors ahead to stay at 2–1.

The seventh inning turned into a nightmare frame for the hosts. Aranda struck again with a clutch two-run single, racing to third on a costly fielding miscue by DeLauter. Moments later, Chandler Simpson lifted an RBI sacrifice fly to plate Aranda, stretching the Rays' cushion to 5–1.

Cleveland refused to go down quietly in front of the home faithful. In the bottom of the seventh, Travis Bazzana ignited the ballpark with a majestic solo shot, trimming the deficit to 5–2. Before the inning could quiet down, Brayan Rocchio followed with an RBI single off Ian Seymour, slicing the margin to 5–3 and bringing the tying run to the on-deck circle.

Tampa Bay delivered the knockout punch in the top of the ninth. Yandy Díaz crushed a two-run homer high and deep, pushing the lead out of reach at 7–3. Bryan Baker took over to slam the door in the ninth, working a scoreless frame in a non-save situation to seal the victory.

With the 7–3 triumph, the Rays evened the series at two games apiece, turning this Fall battle into a brand-new best-of-three.

=== Game 5 ===
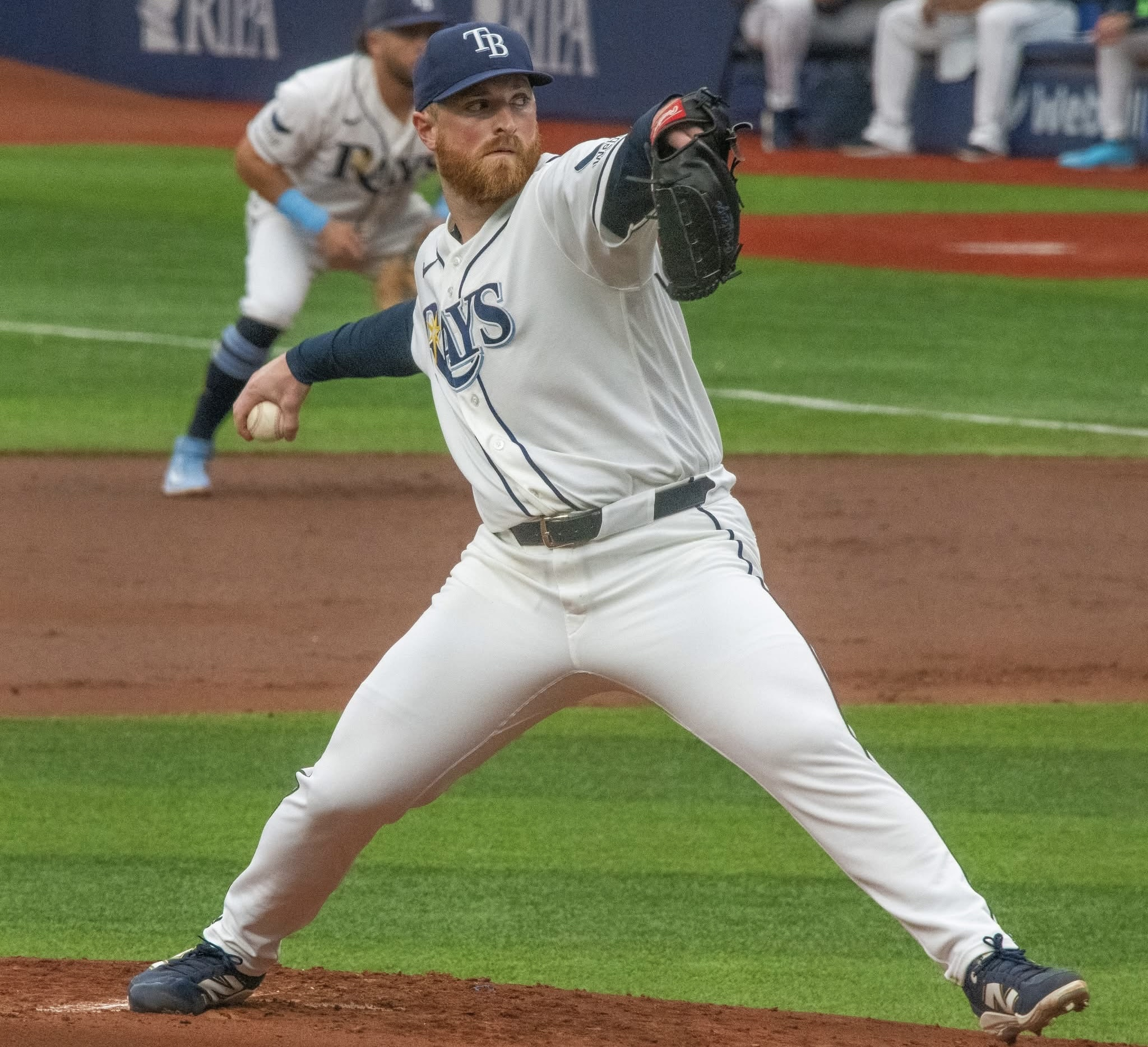
Drew Rasmussen pitched seven innings for the Rays, giving up one run, while striking out six to give them a 3–2 series lead.

October 18, 2026 5:08 pm (EDT) at Progressive Field in Cleveland, Ohio 63 °F (17 °C), Clear
Team	1	2	3	4	5	6	7	8	9	R	H	E
Tampa Bay	1	1	1	0	0	0	0	0	0	3	12	0
Cleveland	0	0	0	0	0	1	0	0	0	1	5	0
WP: Drew Rasmussen (1–0) LP: Parker Messick (0–2) Sv: Bryan Baker (2); Attendance: 36,303; Boxscore

Game 5 of the series, originally scheduled for October 17 at 8:00 p.m. EDT, was rescheduled after Game 4 was postponed. Drew Rasmussen took the hill for Tampa Bay, while Parker Messick drew the start for Cleveland.

The visitors wasted no time putting pressure on the Guardians. In the top of the first inning, Jonny DeLuca drew a bases-loaded walk to force home Yandy Díaz with the game's opening run. Tampa Bay doubled their advantage in the second when Jonathan Aranda laced an RBI single, plating Ben Williamson to make it 2–0. That would be all for Messick, who exited after working just two frames. The Rays tacked on another run in the third when Liam Hicks delivered an RBI single off Tim Herrin, driving home Chandler Simpson to push the lead to 3–0.

Meanwhile, Drew Rasmussen went over seven strong innings, scattering just four hits and a single run while punching out six Cleveland batters.

The Guardians finally scratched across a run in the bottom of the sixth when Chase DeLauter grounded out to plate Steven Kwan, cutting the deficit to 3–1. But Tampa Bay's bullpen locked things down from there. Bryan Baker was summoned to slam the door in the ninth, locking down the save and securing a 3–2 series lead for the Rays.

=== Game 6 ===
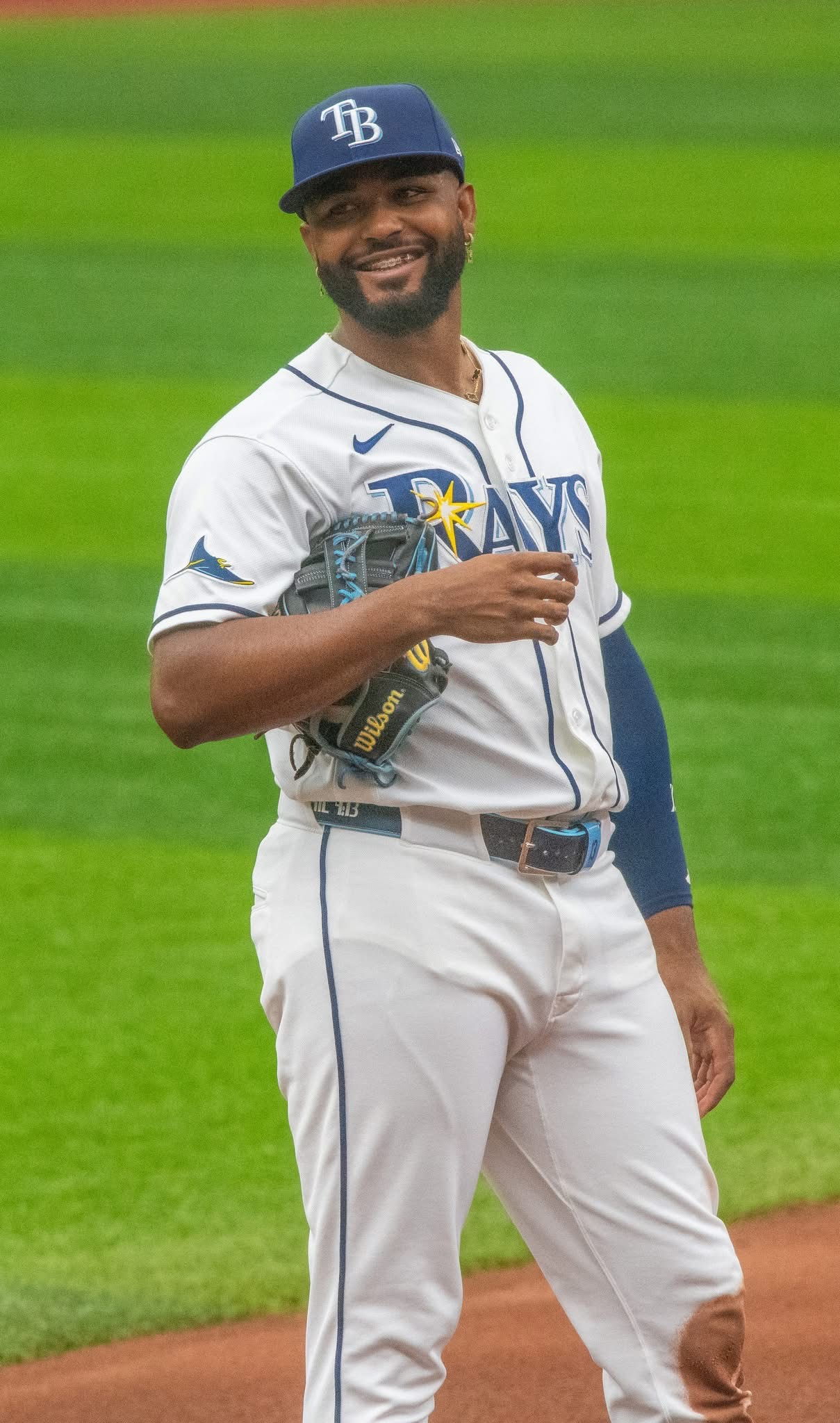
Junior Caminero went 2 for 3 with a home run and two runs scored to send the Rays to their third World Series in franchise history.

October 19, 2026 8:08 pm (EDT) at Tropicana Field in St. Petersburg, Florida 72 °F (22 °C), Dome
Team	1	2	3	4	5	6	7	8	9	R	H	E
Cleveland	0	0	0	0	0	1	0	2	0	3	7	0
Tampa Bay	0	2	1	0	0	0	2	2	X	7	7	0
WP: Freddy Peralta (2–0) LP: Shawn Armstrong (0–1); Home runs: CLE: None; TB: Junior Caminero (1), Yandy Díaz (2); Attendance: 40,230; Boxscore

In the bottom of the second inning, Richie Palacios hit a two-run RBI double off Tim Herrin for the Rays to take the early lead, 2–0. In the bottom of the third inning, Junior Caminero scored on a sacrifice fly by Jonny DeLuca to extend the Rays' lead to 3–0. In the top of the sixth inning, Nathaniel Lowe hit an RBI single, scoring Chase DeLauter to cut the Guardians' deficit to 3–1. Freddy Peralta pitched 5 1/3 innings, allowing five hits and one run while striking out three batters. In the bottom of the seventh, Junior Caminero hit a two-run home run to extend the Rays' lead to 5–1. At 38.66 seconds, Caminero’s home run trot was the second slowest since the start of the Statcast-era (2015).

The Guardians got two runs on the board when Patrick Bailey walked, scoring DeLauter, and Ángel Martínez hit by pitch, scoring Lowe to cut the deficit to 5–3. In the bottom of the eighth, Yandy Díaz hit a two-run home run to extend the Rays' lead to 7–3. The bullpen locked things down from there. Bryan Baker took over to slam the door in the ninth, working a scoreless frame in a non-save situation to seal the victory and send the Rays to their third World Series in franchise history.

The Rays receive the William Harridge Trophy trophy after Game 6.

Game 6 winner Freddy Peralta won the ALCS MVP, who also won Game 2 and pitched an inning in scoreless relief in the series.

=== Composite line score ===
2026 ALCS (4–2): Tampa Bay Rays defeated Cleveland Guardians

Team	1	2	3	4	5	6	7	8	9	R	H	E
Cleveland Guardians	1	1	0	0	2	3	4	4	3	18	46	3
Tampa Bay Rays	3	3	3	5	0	1	5	3	2	25	47	0
Total attendance: 207,475 Average attendance: 34,579

== See also ==
- 2026 National League Championship Series
