= Hunter Feduccia =

American baseball player (born 1997)

Los Angeles Dodgers – No. 46
- Catcher
- Born: June 5, 1997 (age 29); Lake Charles, Louisiana, U.S.
- Bats: Left Throws: Right

MLB debut
- July 31, 2024, for the Los Angeles Dodgers

MLB statistics (through 2026 season)
- Batting average: .205
- Home runs: 3
- Runs batted in: 28
- Stats at Baseball Reference

Teams
- Los Angeles Dodgers (2024–2025); Tampa Bay Rays (2025–2026); Los Angeles Dodgers (2026–present)

Hunter Feduccia (born June 5, 1997) is an American professional baseball catcher for the Los Angeles Dodgers of Major League Baseball (MLB). He has previously played in MLB for the Tampa Bay Rays. Feduccia played college baseball for the LSU Tigers and was selected by the Dodgers in the 12th round of the 2018 MLB draft.

== Career ==
=== Amateur career ===
Feduccia played baseball at Barbe High School, where he hit .353 in his senior season and won three state championships. He went to Louisiana State University at Eunice for two seasons, and was voted Defensive Player of the Year both seasons. Feduccia transferred to Louisiana State University where he batted .233 in 56 games during the 2018 season.

=== Los Angeles Dodgers ===
Feduccia made his professional debut with the rookie–level Ogden Raptors in 2018 and was promoted to the Single–A Great Lakes Loons after only three games. In 2019, he split the season between Great Lakes and the High–A Rancho Cucamonga Quakes, hitting .275 in 72 games. Feduccia did not play in a game in 2020 due to the cancellation of the minor league season because of the COVID-19 pandemic. He was promoted to the Double–A Tulsa Drillers in 2021, where he hit .254 with 10 home runs and 35 RBI in 86 games. 2022 was split between Tulsa and Triple–A Oklahoma City Dodgers, and he hit .238 with 15 homers and 51 RBI between the two levels. In 2023 with Oklahoma City, he hit .279 with 11 homers and 57 RBI in 90 games.

Feduccia was added to the Dodgers 40-man roster on November 14, 2023, in order to be protected from the Rule 5 draft. He was optioned back to Oklahoma City to begin the 2024 season and was promoted to the major leagues for the first time on July 27. He made his MLB debut as a pinch hitter against the San Diego Padres on July 31 and flew out. He recorded his first major league hit on August 25 off of Drew Rasmussen of the Tampa Bay Rays. Feduccia had 12 at-bats in five games in the majors, with four hits and one RBI. In 82 games for Oklahoma City, he batted .284 with six homers and 54 RBI.

Feduccia was optioned to the Triple-A Oklahoma City Comets to begin the 2025 season. In 79 games, he batted .290 with nine home runs and 52 RBI. Feduccia also had three at-bats over two games for the Dodgers without recording a hit.

=== Tampa Bay Rays ===
On July 31, 2025, Feduccia was traded by the Dodgers to the Tampa Bay Rays in exchange for Paul Gervase, Ben Rortvedt and Adam Serwinowski. He made 36 appearances down the stretch, batting .151/.265/.209 with eight RBI and one stolen bases.

On May 20, 2026, Feduccia hit his first career home run off of Shane Baz of the Baltimore Orioles. In 60 games for the Rays, he batted .234 with two home runs and 12 RBI.

=== Los Angeles Dodgers (second stint) ===
On August 3, 2026, Feduccia was re-acquired by the Dodgers (along with Jacob Kmatz) from the Tampa Bay Rays in exchange for Jack Suwinski and international bonus pool money. He played in 33 games for the Dodgers, batting .197.
