= Kenny Piper =

American baseball player (born 1998)

Tampa Bay Rays – No. 50
- Catcher
- Born: July 12, 1998 (age 28); Florissant, Missouri, U.S.
- Bats: Right Throws: Right

MLB debut
- August 3, 2026, for the Tampa Bay Rays

MLB statistics (through 2026 season)
- Batting average: .222
- Home runs: 1
- Runs batted in: 2
- Stats at Baseball Reference

Teams
- Tampa Bay Rays (2026–present)

Kenneth David Piper (born July 12, 1998) is an American professional baseball catcher for the Tampa Bay Rays of Major League Baseball (MLB). He made his MLB debut in 2026.

== Amateur career ==
Piper attended Hazelwood Central High School in Florissant, Missouri, and played college baseball at Columbia College of Missouri. As a senior with Columbia, he hit for a .418 batting average with 17 home runs and 49 runs batted in (RBI). In 2019, Piper played collegiate summer baseball with the Florence RedWolves of the Coastal Plain League and, in 2021, for the State College Spikes of the MLB Draft League.

== Professional career ==
The Tampa Bay Rays selected Piper in the 18th round, with the 551st overall selection, of the 2021 Major League Baseball draft. He made his professional debut that year with the Florida Complex League Rays. Piper split the 2022 campaign between the FCL Rays and the Single-A Charleston RiverDogs, batting .210 with five home runs and 21 RBI. He spent the 2023 season between the High-A Bowling Green Hot Rods and Double-A Montgomery Biscuits, batting .236 with 20 home runs and 46 RBI. Piper returned to Montgomery to begin the 2024 season before earning a promotion to the Triple-A Durham Bulls. Across the two levels, he batted .208 with 12 home runs and 48 RBI. Piper spent the 2025 season with Montgomery and Durham, batting .188 with nine home runs and 30 RBI. Following the season, he played for the Gigantes del Cibao of the Dominican Winter League.

To begin the 2026 season, Piper was assigned to Double-A Montgomery, slashing .253/.359/.498 in 64 games. On August 3, 2026, the Rays selected his contract, added him to the 40-man roster, and promoted him to the major leagues for the first time. Piper made his MLB debut later that day against the Colorado Rockies. He was optioned back to the minor leagues the following day.
