= Parker Messick =

American baseball player (born 2000)

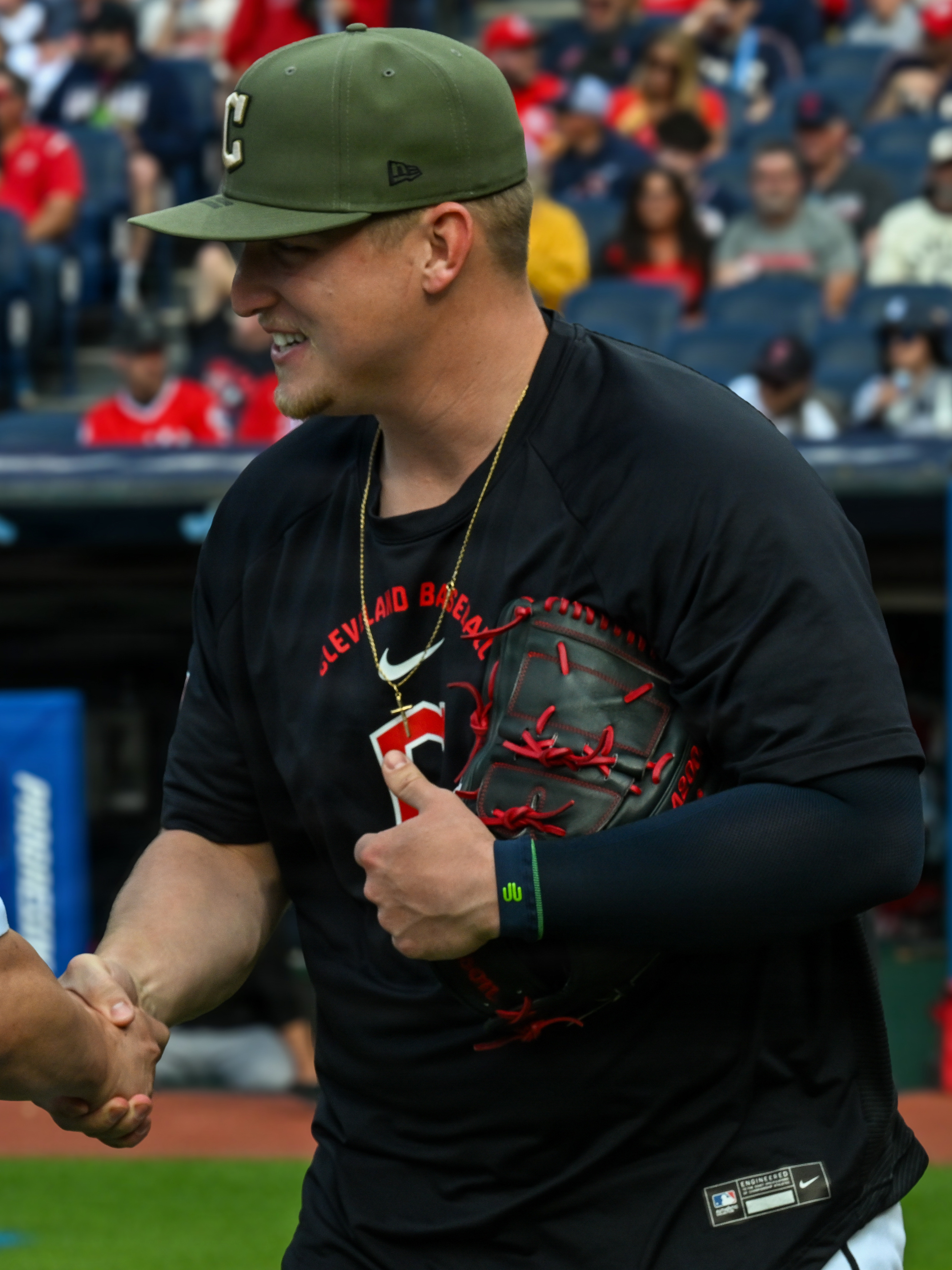
- Messick with the Cleveland Guardians in 2026

Cleveland Guardians – No. 77
- Pitcher
- Born: October 26, 2000 (age 26); Plant City, Florida, U.S.
- Bats: Left Throws: Left

MLB debut
- August 20, 2025, for the Cleveland Guardians

MLB statistics (through 2026 season)
- Win–loss record: 15–10
- Earned run average: 2.59
- Strikeouts: 231
- Stats at Baseball Reference

Teams
- Cleveland Guardians (2025–present)

Career highlights and awards
- All-Star (2026)

Parker Chase Messick (born October 26, 2000) is an American professional baseball pitcher for the Cleveland Guardians of Major League Baseball (MLB). He played college baseball for the Florida State Seminoles. He made his MLB debut in 2025 and was named to his first All-Star game in 2026.

== Amateur career ==
Messick grew up in Plant City, Florida where he attended Plant City High School. He won the Wade Boggs Athletic Achievement Award during his junior year after batting .298 with four home runs as a first baseman and pitching to a 6–3 win-loss record with a 1.58 earned run average (ERA) and 45 strikeouts as a pitcher. As a senior, Messick struck out a state-leading 125 batters with an 11–1 record and a 1.06 ERA over 86 innings and was named Florida Mr. Baseball.

Messick enrolled at Florida State University to play college baseball for the Florida State Seminoles. He went 1–1 with one save and a 0.77 ERA and struck out 19 batters in 11 2/3 innings over six relief appearances during his true freshman season before it was cut short due to the coronavirus pandemic. After the season, he played collegiate summer baseball for the Winter Garden Squeeze of the Florida Collegiate Summer League. Messick won the league's Cy Young Award after going 3–0 with a 0.49 ERA and striking out 27 batters against five hits and three walks in 18 2/3 innings pitched. As a redshirt freshman, Messick posted a 8–2 record with 126 strikeouts and a 3.10 ERA in 90 innings pitched and was named the Atlantic Coast Conference (ACC) Freshman of the Year, the Atlantic Coast Conference Baseball Pitcher of the Year, first team All-ACC, and a third team All-American by Collegiate Baseball and the National Collegiate Baseball Writers Association. He was also occasionally used as a designated hitter and batted .225 with one home run, which he hit in his first collegiate plate appearance, and five RBIs in 40 at-bats.

During the summer of 2021 Messick was named to USA Baseball's Collegiate National Team (CNT), where 46 of the Nations best teamed up to play an 11 game series (Stars versus Stripes) throughout the Appalachian League venues and a 3 game series with USA's Olympic National Team. He was again named the Seminoles' Friday night starter going into his redshirt sophomore season. Messick was also named to the watchlist for the Golden Spikes Award and the Preseason Pitcher of the Year by Perfect Game USA.

== Professional career ==
=== Draft and minor leagues ===
The Cleveland Guardians selected Messick in the second round with the 54th overall selection in the 2022 Major League Baseball draft. He signed with the team on July 30, 2022, and received a signing bonus of $1.3 million. He made his professional debut in 2023, splitting the year between the Single-A Lynchburg Hillcats and High-A Lake County Captains; in 26 appearances (24 starts) for the two affiliates, Messick logged a cumulative 5–6 record and 3.77 ERA with 136 strikeouts across 121 2/3 innings pitched.

In 2024, Messick made 27 appearances (26 starts) split between Lake County and the Double-A Akron RubberDucks, accumulating a 9–6 record and 2.83 ERA with 165 strikeouts and one save across 133 2/3 innings pitched.

=== Cleveland Guardians ===
==== 2025 ====
Messick began the 2025 season with the Triple-A Columbus Clippers, compiling a 5–6 record with 3.47 ERA and 119 strikeouts across 20 starts. On August 20, 2025, Messick was selected to the 40-man roster and promoted to the major leagues for the first time. In his second start on August 26, Messick recorded his first career win after striking out six across seven scoreless innings against the Tampa Bay Rays. Messick started seven games for the Guardians in 2025, pitching to a 3–1 record with a 2.72 ERA and 38 strikeouts across 39 2/3 innings.

==== 2026 ====
On April 16, 2026, Messick came three outs short of pitching a no-hitter against the Baltimore Orioles. On the first pitch of the ninth inning, Leody Taveras hit a single to end the no-hit bid. Messick was removed after giving up a single to Blaze Alexander. On July 4, Messick was named to his first All-Star Game, after posting a 2.85 ERA with 106 strikeouts and only 29 walks across 17 starts up to that point. During the All-Star Game, Messick pitched a scoreless second inning on only ten pitches, punctuated by a strikeout of Brandon Marsh. In his first full major league season, Messick started 32 games for the Guardians, compiling a 12–9 record with a 2.56 ERA and 193 strikeouts across 186 1/3 innings. Compared to the rest of the American League, Messick recorded the 8th-most strikeouts, the 6th-most wins, the 3rd-lowest ERA, and the 2nd-most WAR among pitchers (with 6.3).

On October 1, it was announced that Messick would make his postseason debut as the starter for Game 1 of the 2026 AL Division Series against the Chicago White Sox. During Game 1 Messick recorded six strikeouts and allowed two runs across 4 1/3 innings, ultimatley taking the loss as the Guardians scored zero runs. He earned a no decision after starting Game 4 of the AL Division Series, and earned two more losses ater starting Games 2 and 5 of the AL Championship Series, which the Guardians lost in six games to the Tampa Bay Rays. Across four games and 13 2/3 innings of the 2026 postseason, Messick recorded an 0–3 record with a 3.95 ERA and 17 strikeouts.

On November 2, Messick was named a finalist for the American League Cy Young Award alongside Dylan Cease and Cam Schlittler.

== Personal life ==
Messick is a Christian. He is engaged to Summer Hipp.
