= Nick Fortes =

American baseball player (born 1996)

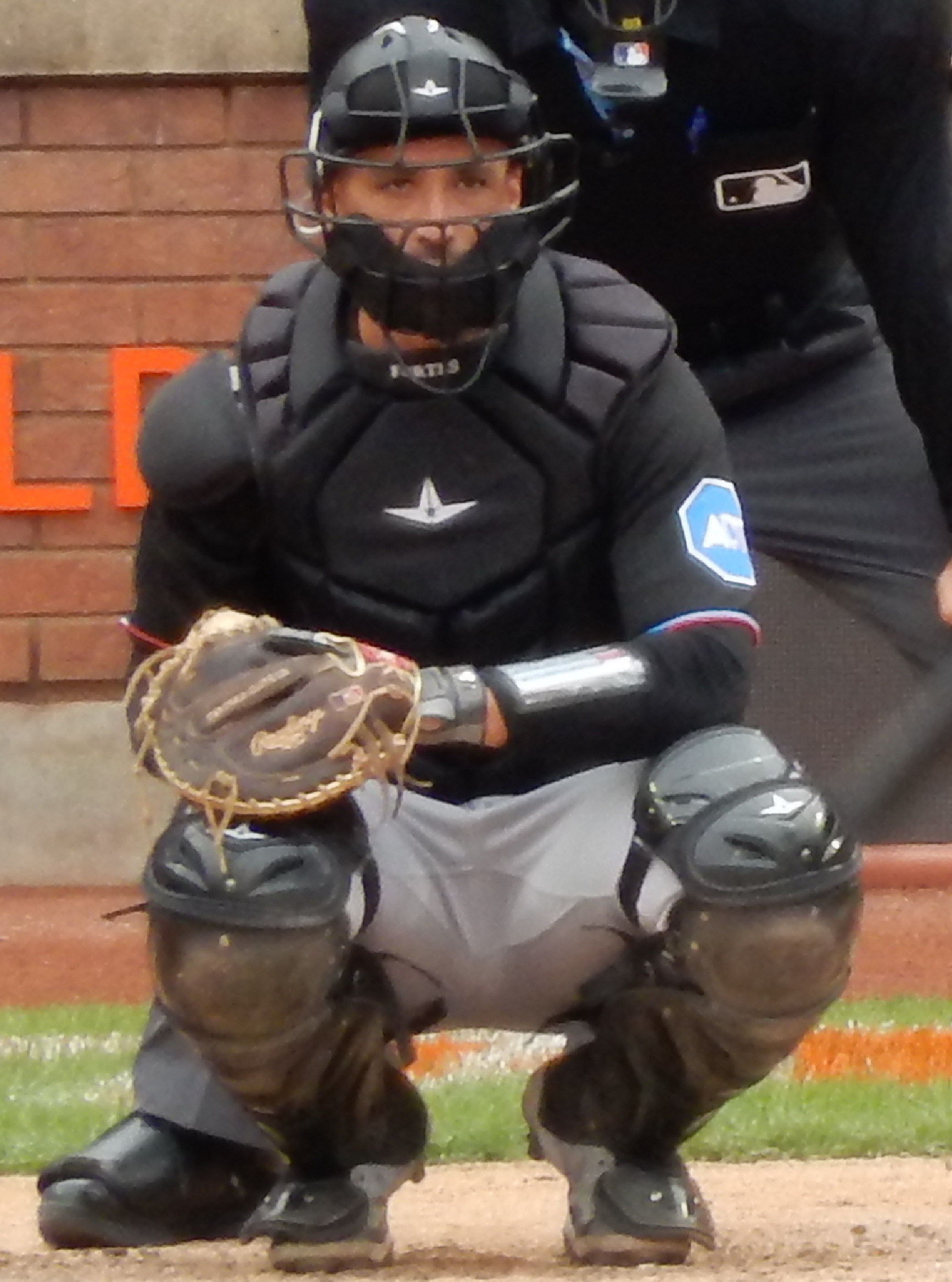
- Fortes with the Miami Marlins in 2023

Boston Red Sox
- Catcher
- Born: November 11, 1996 (age 30); DeLand, Florida, U.S.
- Bats: Right Throws: Right

MLB debut
- September 18, 2021, for the Miami Marlins

MLB statistics (through 2026 season)
- Batting average: .231
- Home runs: 34
- Runs batted in: 142
- Stats at Baseball Reference

Teams
- Miami Marlins (2021–2025); Tampa Bay Rays (2025–2026)

Nicholas Fortes (/ˈfɔːrtɛz/ FOR-tez; born November 11, 1996) is an American professional baseball catcher for the Boston Red Sox of Major League Baseball (MLB). He has previously played in MLB for the Miami Marlins. He played college baseball for the Ole Miss Rebels and was selected by the Marlins in the fourth round of the 2018 MLB draft. He made his MLB debut in 2021 with the Marlins.

== Amateur career ==
Fortes attended DeLand High School in DeLand, Florida.

Undrafted out of high school, he attended the University of Mississippi and played college baseball for the Rebels. In his junior season at Ole Miss, he hit .319/.435/.519 with 11 home runs and 49 RBI.

Fortes played collegiate summer baseball for the Fond du Lac Dock Spiders of the Northwoods League in 2017, soon becoming the first Dock Spider alumnus to play in the majors.

== Professional career ==
=== Miami Marlins ===
Fortes was selected by the Miami Marlins in the fourth round, 117th overall, of the 2018 MLB draft. He began his professional career in 2018 by splitting the season between the rookie-level Gulf Coast League Marlins, the Batavia Muckdogs, and the Greensboro Grasshoppers, hitting a combined .226/.346/.258 with no home runs and 11 RBI. He spent the 2019 season with the Jupiter Hammerheads, hitting .217/.293/.308 with three home runs and 29 RBI.

Fortes did not play in a game in 2020 due to the cancellation of the minor league season because of the COVID-19 pandemic. He split the 2021 minor league season between the Double-A Pensacola Blue Wahoos and Triple-A Jacksonville Jumbo Shrimp, hitting a combined .245/.332/.367 with seven home runs and 44 RBI.

On September 17, 2021, Fortes' contract was selected to the 40-man and active rosters. He made his MLB debut the next day and finished the season with four home runs and seven RBI in 14 games.

On June 26, 2022, Fortes hit a walk-off home run off of Adam Ottavino of the New York Mets, 3–2. In 72 total appearances on the year, he batted .230/.304/.392 with nine home runs, 24 RBI, and five stolen bases.

Fortes spent the 2023 season as Miami's primary catcher, playing in 108 games and hitting .204/.263/.299 with six home runs, 26 RBI, and four stolen bases. He retained starting duties for the 2024 campaign, slashing .227/.259/.318 with four home runs and 29 RBI across 110 appearances.

In 2025, Fortes split time with Agustín Ramírez at catcher, hitting .240/.288/.349 with two home runs and 10 RBI in 59 games.

=== Tampa Bay Rays ===
On July 28, 2025, Fortes was traded to the Tampa Bay Rays in exchange for minor league outfielder Matthew Etzel. He made 38 appearances down the stretch for Tampa Bay, slashing .213/.307/.348 with three home runs, 11 RBI, and one stolen base.

=== Boston Red Sox ===
On November 18, 2026, Fortes was traded to the Boston Red Sox in exchange for Angel Roa.

== Personal life ==
Fortes and his wife Jessica were married in November 2020 but got divorced in late 2022. Fortes later remarried in November 2025.
