= Alex Cook (baseball) =

American baseball player (born 2001)

- Cook with the Tampa Bay Rays in 2026

Tampa Bay Rays – No. 54
- Pitcher
- Born: March 29, 2001 (age 25); Lawrenceville, Georgia, U.S.
- Bats: Right Throws: Right

MLB debut
- July 31, 2026, for the Tampa Bay Rays

Career statistics (through 2026 season)
- Win–loss record: 0–0
- Earned run average: 4.76
- Strikeouts: 5

Teams
- Tampa Bay Rays (2026–present)

Alexander Cook (born March 29, 2001) is an American professional baseball pitcher for the Tampa Bay Rays of Major League Baseball (MLB).

== Career ==
Cook played college baseball at Georgia Gwinnett College and Colby Community College. He was selected by the Tampa Bay Rays in the 12th round of the 2022 Major League Baseball draft.

In 2025, Cook made 17 appearances split between the rookie-level Florida Complex League Rays and Double-A Montgomery Biscuits, accumulating a 2-1 record and 2.66 ERA with 28 strikeouts and four saves across 20 1/3 innings pitched. On November 18, 2025, the Rays added Cook to their 40-man roster to protect him from the Rule 5 draft.

Cook was optioned to Triple-A Durham to begin the 2026 season. In 29 appearances for the Bulls, he compiled a 1–2 record and 3.78 ERA with 37 strikeouts and one save across 33 1/3 innings pitched. On July 31, 2026, Cook was promoted to the major leagues for the first time. He made his debut that day.
