= Jake Bennett (baseball) =

American baseball player (born 2000)

Boston Red Sox – No. 64
- Pitcher
- Born: December 2, 2000 (age 25); Tulsa, Oklahoma, U.S.
- Bats: Left Throws: Left

MLB debut
- May 1, 2026, for the Boston Red Sox

MLB statistics (through 2026 season)
- Win–loss record: 9–7
- Earned run average: 3.65
- Strikeouts: 91
- Stats at Baseball Reference

Teams
- Boston Red Sox (2026–present)

William Jacob Bennett (born December 2, 2000) is an American professional baseball pitcher for the Boston Red Sox of Major League Baseball (MLB). He made his MLB debut in 2026.

== Early life and amateur career ==
Bennett grew up in Bixby, Oklahoma, and attended Bixby High School. He was selected in the 39th round of the 2019 MLB draft by the Washington Nationals, but did not sign with the team.

Bennett attended the University of Oklahoma to play college baseball for the Oklahoma Sooners. He had a 3–0 win–loss record with 0.75 earned run average (ERA) in three starts during his true freshman season before it was cut short due to the coronavirus pandemic. As a redshirt freshman, he had a 4–3 record with a 6.34 ERA and 60 strikeouts in 16 appearances with 13 starts. Bennett was named the Sooners' Friday night starter going into his redshirt sophomore season. He finished the season with a 10–4 record and a 3.69 ERA and 133 strikeouts against 22 walks over 20 appearances with 19 starts. In 2021, he played collegiate summer baseball with the Bourne Braves of the Cape Cod Baseball League.

== Professional career ==
=== Washington Nationals ===
The Washington Nationals selected Bennett in the second round of 2022 Major League Baseball draft. He signed with the team and received a $1,734,800 signing bonus. Bennett made his professional debut in 2023 with the Single-A Fredericksburg Nationals and High-A Wilmington Blue Rocks, compiling a 1–6 record and 3.14 ERA with 73 strikeouts in 63 innings pitched across 15 starts. He underwent Tommy John surgery prior to the conclusion of the season, which consequently caused him to miss the entirety of the 2024 campaign.

Bennett returned to action in 2025 with the Double-A Harrisburg Senators, Wilmington, and Fredericksburg, logging a combined 2–5 record and 2.27 ERA with 64 strikeouts across 19 games (18 starts). On November 18, 2025, the Nationals added Bennett to their 40-man roster to protect him from the Rule 5 draft.

=== Boston Red Sox ===
On December 15, 2025, the Nationals traded Bennett to the Boston Red Sox for another pitching prospect, Luis Perales. Bennett was optioned to the Triple-A Worcester Red Sox to begin the 2026 season. Across his first five outings for Worcester, he compiled a 2–1 record and 0.86 ERA with 16 strikeouts across 21 innings. On May 1, 2026, Bennett was promoted to the major leagues for the first time. He made his MLB debut that evening, starting and earning the win against Mike Burrows and the Houston Astros at Fenway Park, giving up five hits and one earned run in five innings pitched.
