= Kevin Kelly (pitcher, born 1997) =

American baseball player (born 1997)

Tampa Bay Rays – No. 49
- Pitcher
- Born: November 28, 1997 (age 28); Augusta, Georgia, U.S.
- Bats: Right Throws: Right

MLB debut
- April 1, 2023, for the Tampa Bay Rays

MLB statistics (through 2026 season)
- Win–loss record: 18–13
- Earned run average: 3.23
- Strikeouts: 217
- Stats at Baseball Reference

Teams
- Tampa Bay Rays (2023–present)

Kevin Clayton Kelly (born November 28, 1997) is an American professional baseball pitcher for the Tampa Bay Rays of Major League Baseball (MLB). He made his MLB debut in 2023.

== Amateur career ==
Kelly grew up in Springfield, Virginia and attended Paul VI Catholic High School.

Kelly attended James Madison University and played college baseball for the James Madison Dukes for three seasons. He was named a freshman All-American by the Collegiate Baseball Newspaper after going 5–3 with a 2.91 ERA and 38 strikeouts in 34 innings pitched over 24 relief appearances. As a sophomore, Kelly posted a 3–3 record with a 3.74 ERA in 15 appearances with 11 starts. After the 2018 season, he played collegiate summer baseball for the Orleans Firebirds of the Cape Cod Baseball League and was named a league all-star. Kelly went 7–7 with a 3.26 ERA and 94 strikeouts over 15 starts.

== Professional career ==
=== Cleveland Indians / Guardians ===
The Cleveland Indians selected Kelly in the 19th round of the 2019 Major League Baseball draft. After signing with the team he was assigned to the Arizona League Indians and had a 2.08 ERA and struck out 25 batters in 17 1/3 innings pitched. He did not play in a game in 2020 due to the cancellation of the minor league season because of the COVID-19 pandemic.

Kelly was assigned to the High-A Lake County Captains for the 2021 season. In 40 appearances for Lake County, he posted a 5–5 record and 4.66 ERA with 81 strikeouts and 7 saves in 56.0 innings pitched. He began the 2022 season with the Double-A Akron RubberDucks. In 48 appearances split between Akron and the Triple-A Columbus Clippers, Kelly pitched to a combined 5–2 record and 2.04 ERA with 75 strikeouts and 4 saves in 57 1/3 innings of work.

=== Tampa Bay Rays ===
On December 7, 2022, Kelly was selected by the Colorado Rockies in the Rule 5 draft and added to their 40-man roster. The same day, he was traded to the Tampa Bay Rays in exchange for cash considerations. On March 27, 2023, the Rays announced that Kelly had made the Opening Day roster. On April 28, Kelly recorded the final out in a 3–2 victory over the Chicago White Sox to earn his first career save. In 57 appearances out of the bullpen in his rookie campaign, he logged a 3.09 ERA with 56 strikeouts across 67 innings pitched.

Kelly was optioned to the Triple–A Durham Bulls to begin the 2024 season.

== Personal life ==
In January 2023, Kelly announced his engagement via his Instagram account to his longtime girlfriend Dr. Sarah Hosseinian. The two of them married in Leesburg, Virginia on January 13, 2024.

== See also ==
- Rule 5 draft results
