= Ryan Vilade =

American baseball player (born 1999)

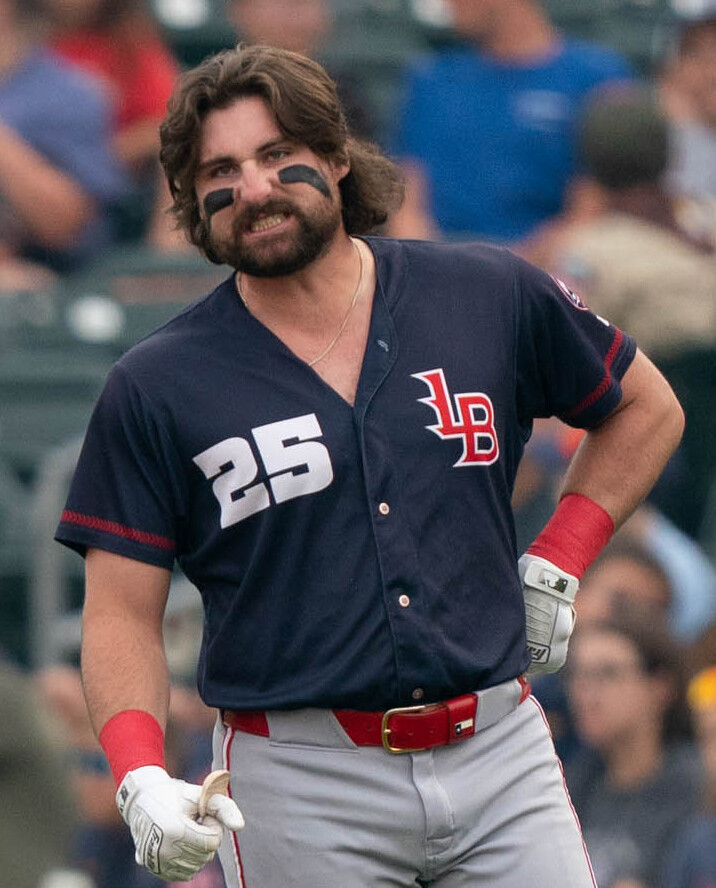
- Vilade with the Louisville Bats in 2025

Tampa Bay Rays – No. 26
- Utility player
- Born: February 18, 1999 (age 27); Grapevine, Texas, U.S.
- Bats: Right Throws: Right

MLB debut
- September 18, 2021, for the Colorado Rockies

MLB statistics (through 2026 season)
- Batting average: .223
- Home runs: 12
- Runs batted in: 48
- Stats at Baseball Reference

Teams
- Colorado Rockies (2021); Detroit Tigers (2024); St. Louis Cardinals (2025); Cincinnati Reds (2025); Tampa Bay Rays (2026–present)
Medals
Men's baseball
Representing United States
U-15 Baseball World Cup
Silver medal – second place	2014 Mazatlán	Team

Ryan James Vilade (/vɪlˈeɪd/ vil-AYD; born February 18, 1999) is an American professional baseball utility player for the Tampa Bay Rays of Major League Baseball (MLB). He has previously played in MLB for the Colorado Rockies, Detroit Tigers, St. Louis Cardinals, and Cincinnati Reds.

== Amateur career ==
Vilade was raised in Frisco, Texas, and attended Frisco High School for three years. In July 2016, after his junior year, he played in the Under Armour All-America Baseball Game at Wrigley Field and won the Home Run Derby with 18 home runs. That fall, he was a member of the 18U United States national team.

Vilade moved to Stillwater, Oklahoma, before his senior year after his father became an assistant coach for the Oklahoma State Cowboys baseball team. After moving, he enrolled and graduated from Stillwater High School in Stillwater. As a senior, he was named the Oklahoma Gatorade Baseball Player of the Year after batting .410 with seven home runs and 28 RBIs along with slugging .778. He committed to play college baseball for the Oklahoma State Cowboys.

== Professional career ==
=== Colorado Rockies ===
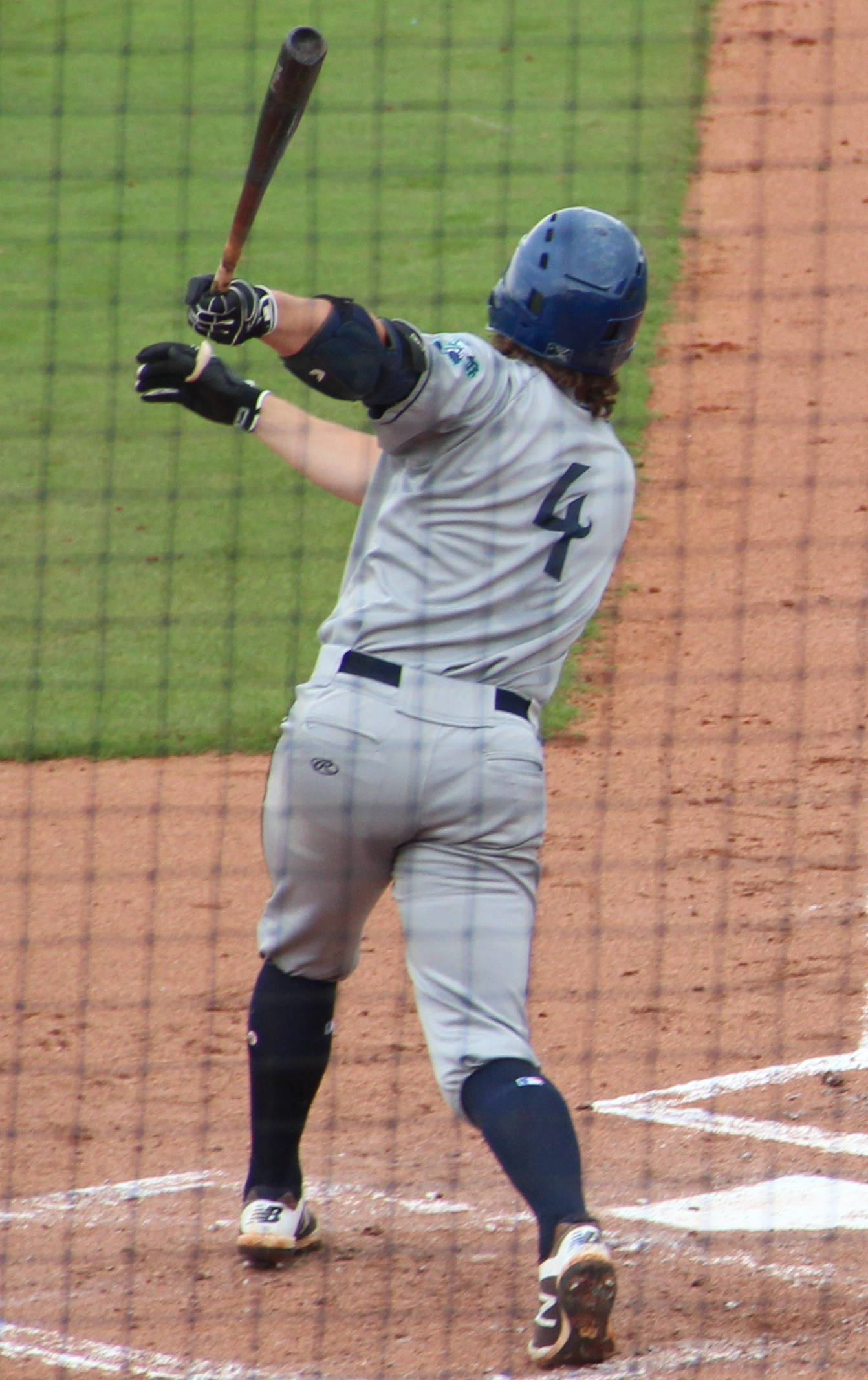
Vilade with the Asheville Tourists in 2018

The Colorado Rockies selected Vilade in the second round, with the 48th overall selection, of the 2017 Major League Baseball draft. He signed for $1.4 million. After signing, he made his professional debut with the Grand Junction Rockies of the Rookie-level Pioneer League. He hit a home run in his first at-bat and was named to the All-Star game. He spent the season with Grand Junction, slashing .308/.438/.496 with five home runs and 21 RBI in 33 games. He spent 2018 with the Asheville Tourists of the Single-A South Atlantic League where he batted .274 with five home runs, 44 RBI, and 17 stolen bases in 124 games.

Vilade spent 2019 with the Lancaster JetHawks of the High-A California League, slashing .303/.367/.466 with 12 home runs, 71 RBI, and 24 stolen bases. He led the minor leagues with 13 sacrifice flies. Prior to the 2020 season, which was eventually cancelled due to the COVID-19 pandemic, Vilade began periodically playing in the outfield in addition to shortstop and third base. To begin the 2021 season, Vilade was assigned to the Albuquerque Isotopes of the Triple-A West. Defensively, he moved to left field and right field. In June, Vilade was selected to play in the All-Star Futures Game at Coors Field. Over 108 games with the Isotopes, Vilade slashed .286/.339/.420 with seven home runs, 43 RBI, 27 doubles, and 12 stolen bases.

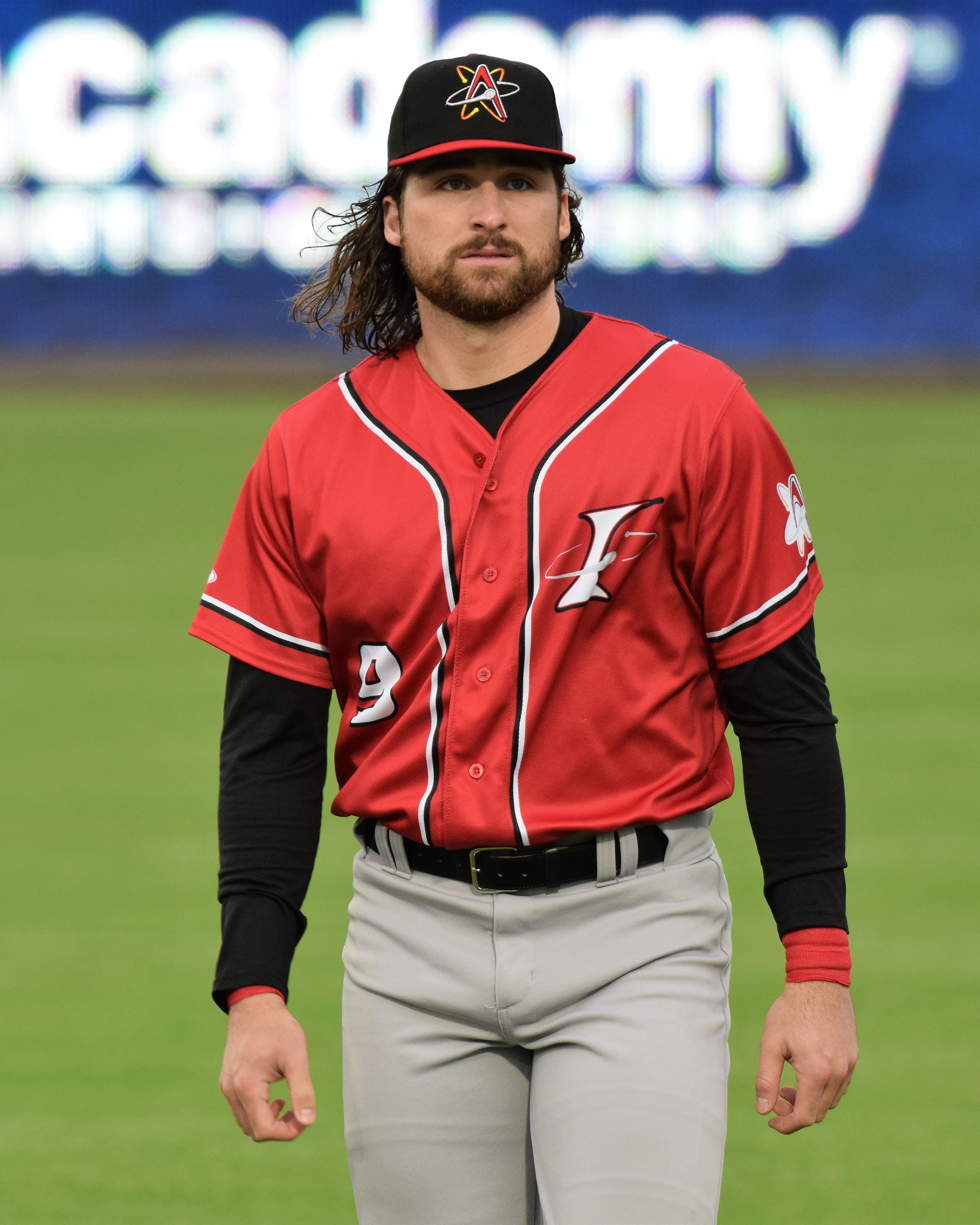
Vilade with the Albuquerque Isotopes in 2022

On September 18, 2021, Colorado selected Vilade's contract and promoted him to the active roster to make his MLB debut that day versus the Washington Nationals at Nationals Park. He started in left field and went hitless over four at-bats. He was selected to play in the Arizona Fall League for the Salt River Rafters after the season where he was named to the Fall Stars Game. Vilade opened the 2022 season in the minor leagues with the Isotopes.

=== Pittsburgh Pirates ===
On November 9, 2022, the Pittsburgh Pirates claimed Vilade off of waivers. Vilade was optioned to the Triple-A Indianapolis Indians to begin the 2023 season. He was designated for assignment on March 30, 2023. On April 4, Vilade cleared waivers and was sent outright to Indianapolis. He played in 122 games for Indianapolis, slashing .271/.370/.382 with 6 home runs, 56 RBI, and 7 stolen bases. Vilade elected free agency following the season on November 6.

=== Detroit Tigers ===
On November 21, 2023, Vilade signed a minor league contract with the Detroit Tigers. After starting the season at Triple-A Toledo Mud Hens, the Tigers selected Vilade's contract on May 7, 2024, where he made his first major league start since 2021. He recorded his first two hits and first three RBI in that game. Vilade was optioned back to the Mud Hens on May 13. Vilade was called up for a second time on July 12. In 17 games for the Tigers, he slashed .178/.208/.244 with one home run and five RBI. On November 4, Vilade was removed from the 40-man roster and sent outright to Toledo. He elected free agency the same day.

=== St. Louis Cardinals ===
On November 28, 2024, Vilade signed a minor league contract with the St. Louis Cardinals. In 48 games for the Triple-A Memphis Redbirds, he slashed .280/.375/.476 with five home runs, 31 RBI, and five stolen bases. On May 31, 2025, the Cardinals selected Vilade's contract, adding him to their active roster. On June 12, he was designated for assignment by the Cardinals after batting 1-for-13 with two walks in seven games.

=== Cincinnati Reds ===
On June 14, 2025, Vilade was claimed off waivers by the Cincinnati Reds and optioned to the Triple-A Louisville Bats. He played his first and only game for the Reds on June 27, coming in as a defensive replacement and, in the ninth inning, fielding the first hit by the San Diego Padres.

=== Tampa Bay Rays ===
On November 3, 2025, Vilade was traded to the Tampa Bay Rays in exchange for cash considerations. Vilade started the 2026 season on the Rays opening day roster.
