= Liam Hicks =

Canadian baseball player (born 1999)

Tampa Bay Rays – No. 34
- Catcher
- Born: June 2, 1999 (age 27); Toronto, Ontario, Canada
- Bats: Left Throws: Right

MLB debut
- March 28, 2025, for the Miami Marlins

MLB statistics (through 2026 season)
- Batting average: .269
- Home runs: 24
- Runs batted in: 127
- Stats at Baseball Reference

Teams
- Miami Marlins (2025–2026); Tampa Bay Rays (2026–present)

Liam John Sherwood Hicks (born June 2, 1999) is a Canadian professional baseball catcher for the Tampa Bay Rays of Major League Baseball (MLB). He made his MLB debut in 2025 with the Miami Marlins.

== Career ==
=== Amateur ===
Hicks attended Lawrence Park Collegiate Institute in Toronto. He enrolled at Mineral Area College and played for their college baseball team for two years. He transferred to Arkansas State University and played for the Arkansas State Red Wolves for two seasons. Hicks played for the Guelph Royals of the Canadian Baseball League in 2018.

=== Texas Rangers ===
The Texas Rangers drafted Hicks in the ninth round, with the 254th overall selection, of the 2021 Major League Baseball draft and he signed with the Rangers, receiving a $30,000 signing bonus. He made his professional debut with the rookie-level Arizona Complex League Rangers. Hicks spent 2022 with the High-A Hickory Crawdads, Single-A Down East Wood Ducks, and the ACL Rangers. In 50 appearances split between the three affiliates, he batted a cumulative .327/.462/.460 with three home runs, 32 RBI, and five stolen bases.

Hicks split the 2023 season between Hickory and the Double-A Frisco RoughRiders, playing in 92 games and hitting a combined .275/.414/.373 with four home runs, 45 RBI, and seven stolen bases.

=== Detroit Tigers ===
On July 28, 2024, the Rangers traded Hicks and Tyler Owens to the Detroit Tigers in exchange for Carson Kelly. He played in 33 games down the stretch for the Double-A Erie SeaWolves, slashing .272/.414/.368 with two home runs, 14 RBI, and two stolen bases.

=== Miami Marlins ===
On December 11, 2024, the Miami Marlins selected Hicks from the Tigers in the Rule 5 draft. Hicks made the Marlins' Opening Day roster, and made his MLB debut on March 28, 2025. On April 19, Hicks hit his first career home run off fellow Canadian Jordan Romano of the Philadelphia Phillies. Hicks made 109 appearances for Miami during his rookie campaign, batting .247/.346/.346 with six home runs and 45 RBI.

Hicks made 101 appearances for Miami during the 2026 season, slashing .282/.363/.432 with 14 home runs and 62 RBI.

=== Tampa Bay Rays ===
On August 3, 2026, the Marlins traded Hicks to the Tampa Bay Rays in exchange for Jacob Kisting, Adrian Santana, and Brayden Taylor. The following day during a game against the Colorado Rockies, Hicks hit a grand slam off of Rockies reliever Gabriel Hughes; the blast was Hicks' first career grand slam, and he became the first Rockies player to hit a grand slam in his debut with the club.

== See also ==
- Rule 5 draft results
