= Ian Seymour =

American baseball player (born 1998)

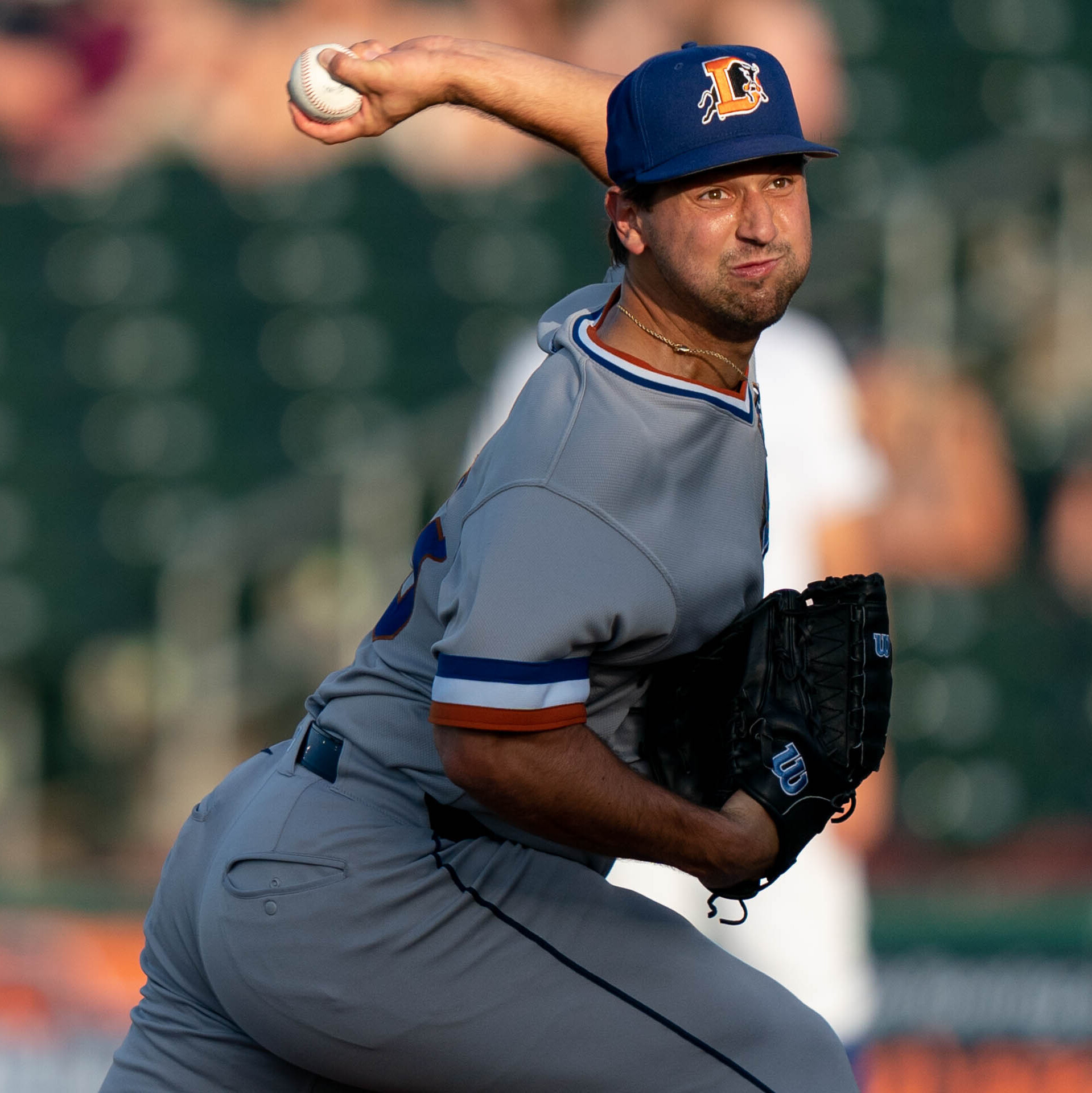
- Seymour with the Durham Bulls in 2025

Tampa Bay Rays – No. 61
- Pitcher
- Born: December 13, 1998 (age 27); Madison, Connecticut, U.S.
- Bats: Left Throws: Left

MLB debut
- June 9, 2025, for the Tampa Bay Rays

MLB statistics (through 2026 season)
- Win–loss record: 13–10
- Earned run average: 4.03
- Strikeouts: 222
- Stats at Baseball Reference

Teams
- Tampa Bay Rays (2025–present)

Ian Albert Seymour (born December 13, 1998) is an American professional baseball pitcher for the Tampa Bay Rays of Major League Baseball (MLB). He made his MLB debut during the 2025 season.

== Amateur career ==
Seymour attended Saint John's High School in Shrewsbury, Massachusetts. He went 4–0 with a 0.48 ERA as a senior in 2017. Following graduation, he enrolled at Virginia Tech where he played college baseball. As a freshman in 2018, he appeared in 14 games (13 starts) in which he compiled a 4.17 ERA and seventy strikeouts over 69 innings. In 2019, he started 13 games, going 4–5 with a 3.97 ERA and 81 strikeouts. After the 2019 season, he played collegiate summer baseball with the Yarmouth–Dennis Red Sox of the Cape Cod Baseball League. He pitched only 20 1/3 innings in 2020 before the remainder of the season was cancelled due to the COVID-19 pandemic.

== Professional career ==
The Tampa Bay Rays selected Seymour in the second round with the 57th overall selection of the 2020 Major League Baseball draft. He signed for $1.2 million. He did not play a minor league game in 2020 due to the cancellation of the season caused by the pandemic. He began the 2021 season with the Charleston RiverDogs of the Low-A East and earned promotions to the Bowling Green Hot Rods of the High-A East and the Durham Bulls of the Triple-A East during the season. Over 14 games (13 starts) for the 2021 season, Seymour went 4–0 with a 1.95 ERA and 87 strikeouts over 55 1/3 innings. He was assigned to the Montgomery Biscuits of the Double-A Southern League to begin the 2022 season. He made five starts before undergoing Tommy John surgery, forcing him to miss the remainder of the season. He returned to play in 2023 and pitched 42 innings between the Rookie-level Florida Complex League Rays, Charleston, Bowling Green and Montgomery, going 1–0 with a 1.50 ERA and 46 strikeouts.

Seymour was assigned to Montgomery to open the 2024 season and was promoted to Durham during the year. In 27 starts split between Montgomery and Durham, he compiled a 9–4 record and 2.35 ERA with 162 strikeouts across 145 1/3 innings pitched. On November 18, 2024, the Rays added Seymour to their 40-man roster to protect him from the Rule 5 draft.

Seymour was optioned to Durham to begin the 2025 season. In 12 appearances (11 starts) for the Bulls, he posted a 5-3 record and 2.95 ERA with 84 strikeouts across 61 innings. On June 8, 2025, Seymour was promoted to the major leagues for the first time. He made his MLB debut on June 9 against the Boston Red Sox at Fenway Park, pitching in extra innings and earning the win in a 10–8 Rays victory. Seymour appeared in 19 games (five starts) with the Rays and went 4–3 with a 3.63 ERA and 64 strikeouts across 57 innings.

Seymour was named to his first Opening Day roster as one of Tampa Bay's relief pitchers to begin the 2026 season. Following injuries to Rays starting pitchers Shane McClanahan and Griffin Jax, he was moved into the team's starting rotation. Seymour appeared in 47 games (16 starts) for the Rays and had a 9–7 record, a 4.21 ERA, and 158 strikeouts across 132 2/3 innings.
