= Bryan Baker (baseball) =

American baseball player (born 1994)

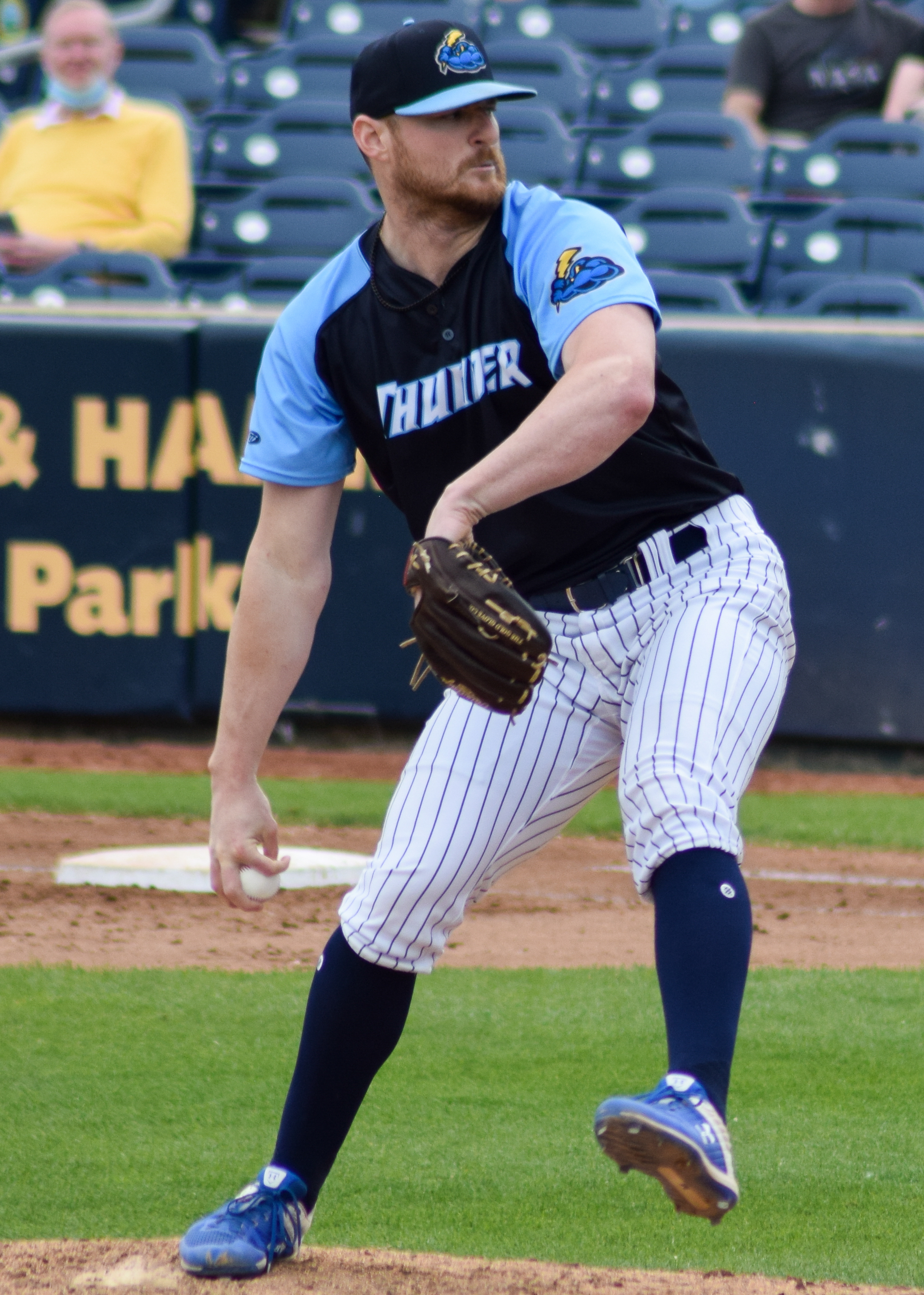
- Baker with the Trenton Thunder in 2021

Tampa Bay Rays – No. 47
- Pitcher
- Born: December 2, 1994 (age 31); Fort Walton Beach, Florida, U.S.
- Bats: Right Throws: Right

MLB debut
- September 5, 2021, for the Toronto Blue Jays

MLB statistics (through 2026 season)
- Win–loss record: 17–13
- Earned run average: 3.30
- Strikeouts: 297
- Saves: 45
- Stats at Baseball Reference

Teams
- Toronto Blue Jays (2021); Baltimore Orioles (2022–2025); Tampa Bay Rays (2025–present)

Career highlights and awards
- All-Star (2026); MLB AL Reliever of the Year (2026); MLB saves leader (2026)

Bryan Scott Baker (born December 2, 1994) is an American professional baseball pitcher for the Tampa Bay Rays of Major League Baseball (MLB). He has previously played in MLB for the Toronto Blue Jays and Baltimore Orioles. Baker was named to his first All-Star game in 2026.

== Amateur career ==
Baker grew up in Fort Walton Beach, Florida and attended Choctawhatchee High School, where he was a standout baseball and basketball player. Baker was selected in the 40th round of the 2013 Major League Baseball draft by the Pittsburgh Pirates, but opted not to sign.

Baker played college baseball for the North Florida Ospreys for three seasons. He was named first team All-Atlantic Sun Conference as a junior after posting a 6–4 record and a conference-leading 2.27 ERA with 80 strikeouts. Baker compiled a 14–10 record with a 3.67 ERA and 144 strikeouts over the course of his collegiate career. He played collegiate summer baseball with the Danville Dans of the Prospect League in 2014 and with the Bourne Braves of the Cape Cod Baseball League in 2015.

== Professional career ==
=== Colorado Rockies ===
Baker was drafted by the Colorado Rockies in the 11th round of the 2016 Major League Baseball draft. After signing with the team he was assigned to the Rookie league Grand Junction Rockies. Baker spent the 2017 season with the Asheville Tourists of the Single–A South Atlantic League, where he was moved to the bullpen and posted a 1.66 ERA on the season. Baker began the 2018 season with the High–A Lancaster JetHawks.

=== Toronto Blue Jays ===
Baker was acquired by the Toronto Blue Jays on August 14, 2018, as the player to be named later to complete a trade for Seung-hwan Oh. The Blue Jays assigned him to the Dunedin Blue Jays of the High–A Florida State League where he had a 2.84 ERA over six appearances. Baker began the 2019 season with the Double-A New Hampshire Fisher Cats before being promoted to the Triple-A Buffalo Bisons, where he had a 3.68 ERA and 31 strikeouts in 22 innings pitched. Baker did not play in a game in 2020 due to the cancellation of the minor league season because of the COVID-19 pandemic, but was assigned to the Blue Jays' Alternate Training Site. He returned to the Buffalo Bisons to start the 2021 minor league season.

On September 1, 2021, Baker was selected to the 40-man roster and promoted to the major leagues for the first time. On September 5, Baker made his MLB debut, tossing a scoreless inning against the Oakland Athletics, striking out one.

=== Baltimore Orioles ===
On November 8, 2021, Baker was claimed off waivers by the Baltimore Orioles.

On April 23, 2022, Baker earned his first career win in a 5–4 victory over the Los Angeles Angels. On September 6, after surrendering two hits and a run to the Toronto Blue Jays, he instigated a benches clearing scrum by staring at the Blue Jays dugout while making a hand puppet-like gesture with his right hand. On the final day of the season, Baker pitched a scoreless ninth inning in the first game of a doubleheader against the Blue Jays to earn his first career save. Baker compiled a 4–3 record with a 3.49 ERA with 76 strikeouts in 66 appearances for the Orioles during the regular season.

Baker made 46 appearances out of the bullpen for Baltimore in 2023, registering a 4–3 record and 3.60 ERA with 51 strikeouts across 45 innings pitched. He was optioned to the Triple–A Norfolk Tides to begin the 2024 season. Baker would go on to make 19 relief outings for the Orioles, posting a 1–1 record and 5.01 ERA with 23 strikeouts across 23 1/3 innings pitched.

Baker made 42 appearances for the Orioles during the 2025 season, compiling a 3–2 record and 3.52 ERA with 49 strikeouts and two saves across 38 1/3 innings pitched.

=== Tampa Bay Rays ===
On July 10, 2025, the Orioles traded Baker to the Tampa Bay Rays in exchange for a competitive balance draft pick in the 2025 draft. He made 31 appearances down the stretch for Tampa Bay, logging a 1–2 record and 4.75 ERA with 34 strikeouts and one save across 30 1/3 innings pitched.

Baker enjoyed a breakout season in 2026 as he recorded a 1.44 ERA and 63 strikeouts in 62 1/3 innings while tying for the MLB lead with 41 saves. He was selected to the 2026 MLB All-Star Game, in which he recorded the final out, and on August 8, he recorded his 23rd consecutive save against the Seattle Mariners, breaking the franchise record previously set by Fernando Rodney.

On November 11, Baker become the winner of the Mariano Rivera AL Reliever of the Year Award.

== Personal life ==
Baker is the son of Cathy and Scott Baker. He has an older sister named Chelsea. Baker's grandfather, Ed Baker, played football at Auburn University. His cousin, Matt Krembel, played golf at Army.
