= Drew Rasmussen =

American baseball player (born 1995)

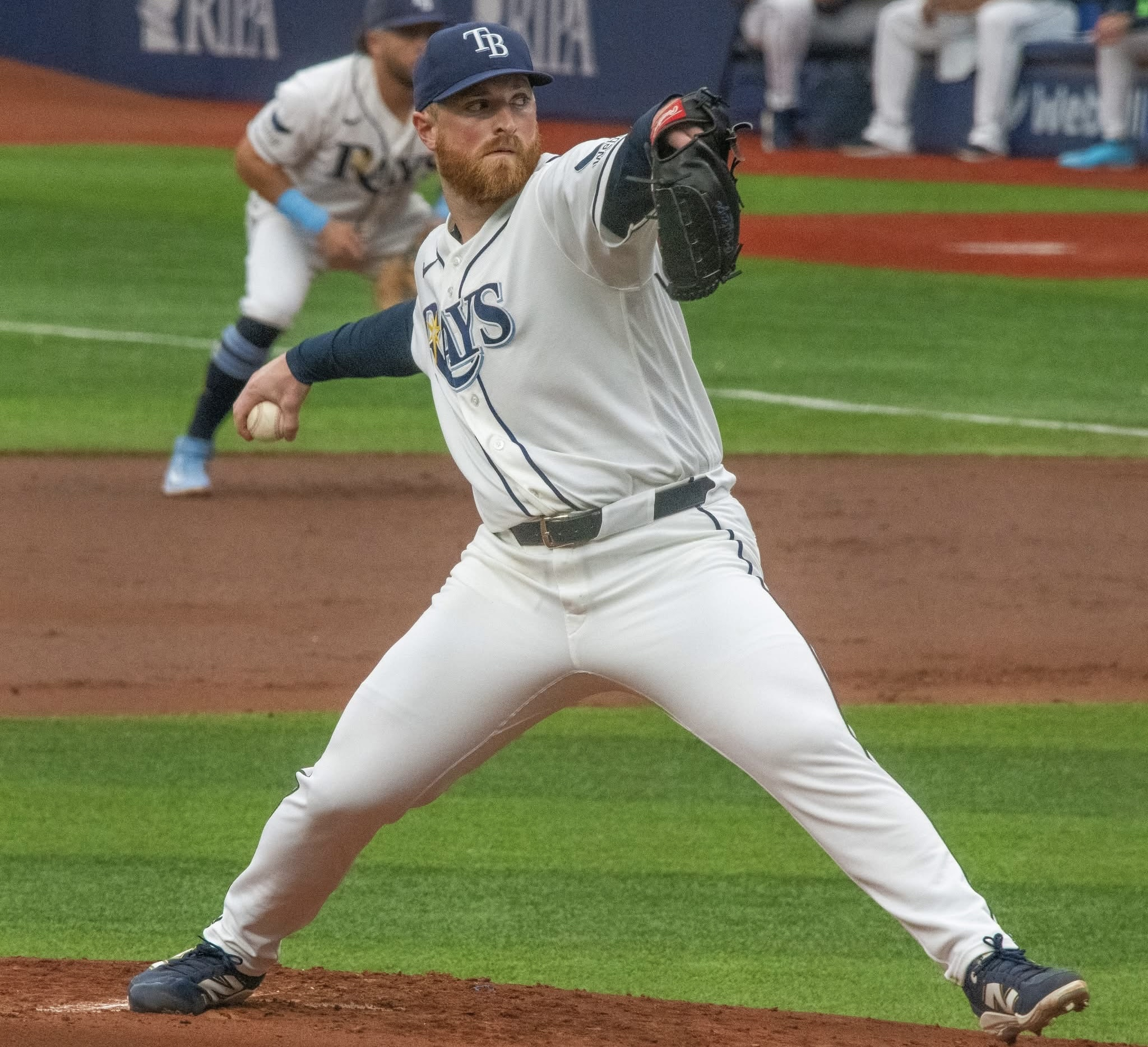
- Rasmussen with the Tampa Bay Rays in 2026

Tampa Bay Rays – No. 57
- Pitcher
- Born: July 27, 1995 (age 31); Puyallup, Washington, U.S.
- Bats: Right Throws: Right

MLB debut
- August 19, 2020, for the Milwaukee Brewers

MLB statistics (through 2026 season)
- Win–loss record: 46–22
- Earned run average: 2.83
- Strikeouts: 602
- Stats at Baseball Reference

Teams
- Milwaukee Brewers (2020–2021); Tampa Bay Rays (2021–present)

Career highlights and awards
- 2× All-Star (2025, 2026)

Drew Thomas Rasmussen (born July 27, 1995) is an American professional baseball pitcher for the Tampa Bay Rays of Major League Baseball (MLB). He has previously played in MLB for the Milwaukee Brewers, for whom he made his MLB debut in 2020. In 2025 and 2026, Rasmussen was named to his first two All-Star games.

== Amateur career ==
Rasmussen attended Mt. Spokane High School in Mead, Washington, and later attended Oregon State University where he played college baseball for the Beavers. Prior to his freshman season, Rasmussen was drafted by the Arizona Diamondbacks in the 39th round of the 2014 MLB draft. On March 21, 2015, as a freshman, he pitched the only perfect game in the team's history, in a 3–0 victory over Washington State. He was drafted 31st overall in the 2017 Major League Baseball draft by the Tampa Bay Rays but did not sign.

Rasmussen underwent his second Tommy John surgery in September 2017 which forced him to miss all of the 2018 season.

== Professional career ==
=== Milwaukee Brewers ===
Despite missing the 2018 season, Rasmussen was still drafted by the Milwaukee Brewers in the sixth round, with the 185th overall selection, of the 2018 Major League Baseball draft.

Rasmussen spent his first professional season in 2019 with the Single–A Wisconsin Timber Rattlers, High–A Carolina Mudcats, and Double–A Biloxi Shuckers. In 27 games (23 starts) split between the three affiliates, he compiled a 1–3 record and 3.15 ERA with 96 strikeouts across 74 1/3 innings pitched.

On August 13, 2020, Rasmussen was selected to the 40-man roster and promoted to the major leagues for the first time. He made his major league debut on August 19 against the Minnesota Twins and threw two scoreless innings. In 12 games during his debut campaign, Rasmussen posted a 5.87 ERA with 21 strikeouts across 15 1/3 innings pitched. Rasmussen began the 2021 season in the Milwaukee bullpen. He recorded a 4.24 ERA with 25 strikeouts and one save in 15 games for the Brewers.

=== Tampa Bay Rays ===
On May 21, 2021, the Brewers traded Rasmussen and J. P. Feyereisen to the Tampa Bay Rays in exchange for Willy Adames and Trevor Richards. In 20 appearances (10 starts) down the stretch, he logged a 4–0 record and 2.44 ERA with 48 strikeouts.

=== 2022 ===
Rasmussen pitched eight perfect innings before losing the perfect game in the ninth inning on August 14, 2022. In 2022, Rasmussen was named American League Pitcher of the Month for August, when he registered a 3–1 record in six starts to go along with a 1.57 ERA and 33 strikeouts against only four walks. He finished the 2022 season making 28 starts for the Rays, and pitched to a 11–7 record and 2.84 ERA with 125 strikeouts in 146.0 innings pitched.

=== 2023–2024 ===
Rasmussen began the 2023 season out of the Rays' rotation, making 8 starts and registering a 4–2 record and 2.62 ERA with 47 strikeouts in 44.2 innings pitched. On May 12, 2023, Rasmussen was placed on the 60-day injured list after being diagnosed with a flexor strain in his forearm. On July 8, Rays manager Kevin Cash stated that Rasmussen would undergo an internal brace procedure on his elbow and miss the remainder of the season.

Rasmussen began the 2024 season on the Rays' 60-day injured list as he continued to recover from surgery. He was activated from the injured list on August 7, 2024. In 16 games (4 starts) for the Rays, Rasmussen compiled an 0-2 record and 2.83 ERA with 35 strikeouts across 28 2/3 innings pitched.

=== 2025 ===
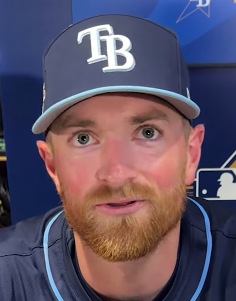
Rasmussen at the 2025 MLB All-Star Game

On January 6, 2025, Rasmussen and the Rays avoided salary arbitration by agreeing to a two-year deal worth $8.5 million. He was named an All-Star on July 11, replacing Angels pitcher Yusei Kikuchi on the active roster. Rasmussen finished the 2025 MLB season, making 31 starts with a 10-5 record. He posted a 2.76 ERA across 150.0 innings pitched, striking out 127 batters while maintaining a 1.02 WHIP and holding opponents to a .214 batting average.

=== 2026 ===
Rasmussen was the Rays' Opening Day starter in 2026. On June 10, 2026, Rasmussen recorded 13 strikeouts in a 7–5 victory over the Boston Red Sox. On July 2, Rasmussen was named the AL Pitcher of the Month after going 3–2 with a 0.82 ERA, 39 strikeouts, four walks one home run and a 0.61. walks plus hits per inning pitched while holding opponents to a .142/.192/.195 slash line over five starts in June.

On October 3, Rasmussen outdueled Gerrit Cole in the first game of the American League Division Series, pitching eight innings of one-hit ball and striking out 10 over 101 pitches. He was throwing a no-hitter until New York Yankees catcher Austin Wells hit a double as his last hitter in the top of the 8th, but was thrown out trying to extend to 3rd base. The Rays went on to win 1-0.

== Personal life ==
Rasmussen and his wife, Stevie, were married in 2020. They had their first child in September 2022 and their second child in April 2026. Rasmussen is a Christian.

== See also ==
- List of World Series starting pitchers

Awards
Preceded by Spencer Arrighetti	American League Pitcher of the Month; June 2026	Succeeded by Dylan Cease
