= 2026 Major League Baseball postseason =

2026 Major League Baseball playoffs

Tournament details
- Dates: September 29 – October 28, 2026
- Teams: 12

Final positions
- Champions: Milwaukee Brewers (1st title)
- Runners-up: Tampa Bay Rays

Tournament statistics
- Games played: 40
- Attendance: 1,649,174 (41,229 per game)
- Best BA: Ben Rice (NYY) (.421 (Note: Minimum 20 plate appearances or 9 bases on balls in the postseason.))
- Most HRs: Ben Rice (NYY) (4)
- Most SBs: Chandler Simpson (TB) (5)
- Best ERA: Aaron Ashby (MIL) (0.00 (Note: Minimum 15 innings pitched or 3 games started in the postseason.) (Note: Postseason record, tied with 10 other players.))
- Most Ks (as pitcher): Gavin Williams (CLE) (33)

Awards
- MVP: William Contreras (MIL)

The 2026 Major League Baseball postseason was a playoff tournament of Major League Baseball (MLB) for the 2026 season. The winners of the Wild Card Series faced the two best division winners (seeds) in each league in the Division Series, and the victors advanced to the League Championship Series to determine the pennant winners, who then played each other in the 2026 World Series. The postseason began on September 29.

In the American League, the Tampa Bay Rays returned to the postseason for the sixth time in the last eight years (2019–2023, 2026). Joining them were the New York Yankees, who clinched their third consecutive playoff berth (2024–2026) and the tenth in the last twelve years (2015, 2017–2022, 2024–2026), as well as the Boston Red Sox, who returned for the second consecutive season (2025–2026) and sixth in the last eleven years (2016–2018, 2021, 2025–2026). The Chicago White Sox clinched their third postseason berth in seven years (2020–2021). The Cleveland Guardians clinched their third consecutive playoff berth (2024–2026) and fifth in the last seven years (2020, 2022, 2024–2026), and the Houston Astros returned for the tenth time in the last twelve seasons (2015, 2017–2024, 2026), becoming the first team in MLB history to win their division without a winning record.

In the National League, the Atlanta Braves returned to the postseason for the eighth time in the last nine years (2018−2024, 2026). The Los Angeles Dodgers clinched their fourteenth straight postseason berth (2013–2026), tying the Braves for the longest postseason appearance streak in league history (the Braves previously made fourteen straight postseason appearances from 1991 to 2005, excluding 1994, when the postseason was canceled due to a strike). Also returning are the Milwaukee Brewers, who returned for the fourth consecutive season (2023–2026) and the eighth time in the last nine years (2018–2021, 2023–2026). The Chicago Cubs returned for their second consecutive season (2025–2026) and the seventh appearance in the last 12 years (2015–2018, 2020, 2025–2026), marking just the fourth time ever that both Chicago teams made it to the postseason (1906, 2008, 2020). The San Diego Padres for the first time in franchise history clinched their third consecutive playoff berth (2024–2026) and fifth in the last seven years (2020, 2022, 2024–2026), and the Philadelphia Phillies made their fifth consecutive postseason appearance (2022–2026).

The postseason ended on October 28, with the Brewers defeating the Rays in five games in the 2026 World Series for their first championship in franchise history.

For the first time under the 2022 expanded 12-team format, no Wild Card teams advanced to the League Championship Series nor the World Series, as all four teams were the top two division winners. There were also just two-extra innings games played throughout the entire postseason, the fewest since 2006, which had none.

== Teams ==
American League Teams National League Teams

The following teams qualified for the postseason:

=== American League ===
1. Tampa Bay Rays — 98–64, AL East champions
2. Cleveland Guardians — 85–77, AL Central champions
3. Houston Astros — 81–81, AL West champions
4. New York Yankees — 93–68
5. Boston Red Sox — 87–75
6. Chicago White Sox — 84–78

=== National League ===
1. Milwaukee Brewers — 103–59, NL Central champions
2. Los Angeles Dodgers — 100–62, NL West champions
3. Atlanta Braves — 94–68, NL East champions
4. San Diego Padres — 91–71
5. Chicago Cubs — 89–73
6. Philadelphia Phillies — 88–74

== Playoff bracket ==
Wild Card Series are best-of-three, Division Series are best-of-five, Championship Series and World Series are best-of-seven.

Wild Card Series (ALWCS, NLWCS)
4	NY Yankees	2
5	Boston	0
3	Houston	0
6	Chicago White Sox	2
4	San Diego	2
5	Chicago Cubs	0
3	Atlanta	2
6	Philadelphia	1

Division Series (ALDS, NLDS)
1	Tampa Bay	3
4	NY Yankees	0
American League
2	Cleveland	3
6	Chicago White Sox	2
1	Milwaukee	3
4	San Diego	1
National League
2	LA Dodgers	3
3	Atlanta	1

Championship Series (ALCS, NLCS)
1	Tampa Bay	4
2	Cleveland	2
1	Milwaukee	4
2	LA Dodgers	0

World Series
AL1	Tampa Bay	1
NL1	Milwaukee	4

== American League Wild Card Series ==
=== (3) Houston Astros vs. (6) Chicago White Sox ===
Chicago won the series, 2–0.

Game	Date	Score	Location	Time	Attendance
1	September 29	Chicago White Sox – 6, Houston Astros – 3	Daikin Park	3:13	34,011
2	September 30	Chicago White Sox – 7, Houston Astros – 3	Daikin Park	3:05	36,015

This was the third postseason meeting between the Astros and White Sox. Their previous meetings were the 2005 World Series (when the Astros were members of the National League) and the ALDS in 2021, with the White Sox sweeping the former, and the Astros winning the latter before falling in the World Series. The White Sox swept the Astros to advance to the ALDS for the first time since 2021.

An RBI double from Sam Antonacci and a solo homer from Colson Montgomery helped secure Game 1 for the White Sox. An RBI single by Kyle Teel got the scoring started early for Chicago as they led for the entirety of Game 2, completing the sweep and handing the Astros their sixth straight playoff game loss dating back to the 2023 ALCS. This was the first playoff series win by the White Sox since the 2005 World Series, which was also a sweep over the Astros.

=== (4) New York Yankees vs. (5) Boston Red Sox ===
New York won the series, 2–0.

Game	Date	Score	Location	Time	Attendance
1	September 29	Boston Red Sox – 0, New York Yankees – 9	Yankee Stadium	3:01	48,437
2	September 30	Boston Red Sox – 2, New York Yankees – 9	Yankee Stadium	2:59	49,004

This was the seventh postseason meeting in the history of the Red Sox–Yankees rivalry (1999, 2003, 2004, 2018, 2021, 2025). The Yankees swept the Red Sox to advance to the ALDS for the eighth time in ten years.

This series was heavily lopsided in favor of the Yankees. Cam Schlittler pitched six innings of shutout ball as the Yankees blew out the Red Sox in Game 1. In Game 2, Max Fried pitched six shutout innings and Cody Bellinger and Luis Garcia Jr. both homered for the Yankees as they blew out the Red Sox again to advance. This was the first postseason series sweep by either team in the history of the rivalry.

With the win, the Yankees improved to 4–3 against the Red Sox in the postseason, previously winning in 1999, 2003, and 2025.

== National League Wild Card Series ==
=== (3) Atlanta Braves vs. (6) Philadelphia Phillies ===
Atlanta won the series, 2–1.

Game	Date	Score	Location	Time	Attendance
1	September 29	Philadelphia Phillies – 3, Atlanta Braves – 5	Truist Park	2:26	30,127
2	September 30	Philadelphia Phillies – 4, Atlanta Braves – 3 (10)	Truist Park	3:03	37,150
3	October 1	Philadelphia Phillies – 2, Atlanta Braves – 6	Truist Park	2:46	41,731

This was the fourth postseason meeting between the Braves and Phillies (1993, 2022, 2023). The Phillies had won all three previous meetings, with the first two resulting in Philadelphia falling in the World Series. This time, the Braves returned the favor, defeating the Phillies in three games to advance to the NLDS for the seventh time in nine years.

In Game 1, the Phillies held a 3–2 lead after seven innings, but it evaporated in the bottom of the eighth when Austin Riley launched a three-run home run to secure a comeback win for the Braves. Game 2 saw a reversed script: the Braves led 3–1 heading into the eighth, only for the Phillies to force extra innings behind solo shots from Kyle Schwarber and Bryce Harper. Alec Bohm then broke the tie with his own solo homer in the top of the tenth to put Philadelphia ahead for good, evening the series. However, that momentum stalled as the Braves bounced back in Game 3. Powered by home runs from Michael Harris II, Ozzie Albies, and Matt Olson, Atlanta built an early cushion that they never relinquished, exacting long-awaited revenge on the team that eliminated them three straight times.

This victory marked the Braves' first postseason series win since the 2021 World Series, and concluded as the only Wild Card series of the 2026 postseason that was not decided in a sweep.

=== (4) San Diego Padres vs. (5) Chicago Cubs ===
San Diego won the series, 2–0.

Game	Date	Score	Location	Time	Attendance
1	September 29	Chicago Cubs – 0, San Diego Padres – 8	Petco Park	2:40	47,048
2	September 30	Chicago Cubs – 1, San Diego Padres – 4	Petco Park	2:50	47,513

This was the third postseason meeting between the Cubs and Padres (1984, 2025). The Padres swept the Cubs to advance to the NLDS for the fourth time in six years.

Michael King pitched seven innings of shutout ball as the Padres blew out the Cubs in Game 1. A two-run RBI single from Xander Bogaerts and a two-run home run from Gavin Sheets secured a Padres victory in Game 2, completing the sweep. Game 2 was notable for a controversial moment involving Cubs pitcher Daniel Palencia, who hit Padres infielder Jake Cronenworth with his next pitch after surrendering the home run to Sheets. The Padres' players shouted obscenities at Palencia, however the situation was deescalated and no further incidents occurred afterward.

With the win, the Padres improved to 2–1 against the Cubs in the postseason.

== American League Division Series ==
=== (1) Tampa Bay Rays vs. (4) New York Yankees ===
Tampa Bay won the series, 3–0.

Game	Date	Score	Location	Time	Attendance
1	October 3	New York Yankees – 0, Tampa Bay Rays – 1	Tropicana Field	2:30	40,542
2	October 5	New York Yankees – 2, Tampa Bay Rays – 5	Tropicana Field	3:02	40,226
3	October 7	Tampa Bay Rays – 4, New York Yankees – 3	Yankee Stadium	3:04	48,865

This was the second postseason meeting between the Rays and Yankees. They last met in the ALDS in 2020, which the Rays won in five games before falling in the World Series. The Rays swept the Yankees to advance to the ALCS for the first time since 2020.

Drew Rasmussen pitched eight shutout innings despite having a no-hit bid broken up as the Rays narrowly took Game 1. Game 2 turned out to be a disaster for the Yankees, as they committed three errors in the first inning, and the Rays offense chased Cam Schlittler from the mound as they won to take a 2–0 series lead headed to the Bronx. In Game 3, misfortune fell upon the Yankees again, as what would've been a game-tying two-run home run for Anthony Volpe in the bottom of the sixth was changed to an RBI double due to fan interference, which kept the Rays in the lead for good as they completed the sweep. This was the first playoff series win for the Rays since winning the American League pennant in 2020, and it marked the first time ever that the Yankees were swept in a postseason series outside of the ALCS and World Series.

=== (2) Cleveland Guardians vs. (6) Chicago White Sox ===
Cleveland won the series, 3–2.

Game	Date	Score	Location	Time	Attendance
1	October 3	Chicago White Sox – 3 Cleveland Guardians – 0	Progressive Field	2:46	34,287
2	October 5	Chicago White Sox – 4 Cleveland Guardians – 3	Progressive Field	3:06	32,050
3	October 7	Cleveland Guardians – 9 Chicago White Sox – 3	Rate Field	3:16	40,590
4	October 8	Cleveland Guardians – 9 Chicago White Sox – 5	Rate Field	3:39	39,920
5	October 10	Chicago White Sox – 0, Cleveland Guardians – 2	Progressive Field	2:36	36,889

This was the first postseason meeting between the Guardians and White Sox. The Guardians overcame a two-games-to-none series deficit to defeat the White Sox in five games, returning to the ALCS for second time in the last three years (2024, 2026). This was the first 0–2 series comeback in the ALDS since 2017, which the Guardians/Indians, ironically, lost.

A two-run home run from Munetaka Murakami in the top of the fourth turned out to be all the White Sox needed to steal Game 1 on the road. In Game 2, the Guardians took a 2–0 lead early after a throwing error by Chicago's Sean Newcomb in the bottom of the first, but the White Sox rallied with four unanswered runs off of RBIs from Murakami, Braden Montgomery, and Chase Meidroth across the fourth and sixth innings respectively to take a 2–0 series lead headed to Chicago. Then, the White Sox imploded. In Game 3, the Guardians blew out the White Sox to avoid a sweep. In Game 4, the White Sox held a 4–3 lead after the fifth, but then the Guardians put up six unanswered runs in the top of the sixth, capped off by a two-run RBI single from Jo Adell, to force a decisive fifth game back in Cleveland. In Game 5, Gavin Williams pitched nearly six innings of shutout ball, and José Ramírez hit a go-ahead two-run homer in the bottom of the fourth to put the Guardians in the lead for good, completing an improbable comeback.

With the win, the Guardians were now 1–1 against the Chicago MLB teams in the postseason, having previously lost the 2016 World Series in seven games to the Cubs, when the team was still known as the Cleveland Indians.

== National League Division Series ==
=== (1) Milwaukee Brewers vs. (4) San Diego Padres ===
Milwaukee won the series, 3–1.

Game	Date	Score	Location	Time	Attendance
1	October 3	San Diego Padres – 2, Milwaukee Brewers – 3	American Family Field	3:28	42,843
2	October 4	San Diego Padres – 3, Milwaukee Brewers – 4	American Family Field	3:14	41,683
3	October 6	Milwaukee Brewers – 3, San Diego Padres – 4	Petco Park	3:22	47,708
4	October 7	Milwaukee Brewers – 3, San Diego Padres – 1	Petco Park	3:00	47,712

This was the first postseason meeting between the Brewers and Padres, both expansion teams from 1969. The Brewers defeated the Padres in four games to advance to the NLCS for the third time in eight years.

In Game 1, the Padres took an early 2–0 lead in the top of the second, but the Brewers rallied with three unanswered runs off of home runs from Jackson Chourio and William Contreras to win. In Game 2, the Brewers again found themselves trailing the Padres, but they rallied to win in the bottom of the ninth thanks to a walk-off two-run RBI single from Chourio to take a 2–0 series lead headed to San Diego. A solo homer from Jake Cronenworth broke a 2–2 tie in the bottom of the sixth and put the Padres back in the lead for good as they won Game 3. In Game 4, with the game tied at one going into the fifth, Chourio hit an RBI single scoring Garrett Mitchell which put the Brewers in the lead for good as they closed out the series. This was the first playoff road game won by the Brewers since Game 3 of the NLCS in 2018.

=== (2) Los Angeles Dodgers vs. (3) Atlanta Braves ===
Los Angeles won the series, 3–1.

Game	Date	Score	Location	Time	Attendance
1	October 3	Atlanta Braves – 3, Los Angeles Dodgers – 5	Dodger Stadium	2:44	50,194
2	October 4	Atlanta Braves – 3, Los Angeles Dodgers – 2	Dodger Stadium	3:18	50,729
3	October 6	Los Angeles Dodgers – 3, Atlanta Braves – 1	Truist Park	2:56	42,420
4	October 7	Los Angeles Dodgers – 4, Atlanta Braves – 1	Truist Park	2:54	41,173

This was the sixth postseason matchup between the Dodgers and Braves (1996, 2013, 2018, 2020, 2021), tying Reds–Pirates, Dodgers–Cardinals and Dodgers–Phillies for the most frequent postseason matchups in the National League. The Dodgers defeated the Braves in four games to advance to the NLCS for the eleventh time in the last eighteen years.

Tarik Skubal pitched six solid innings and the Dodger bullpen stopped a late rally by the Braves as they took Game 1. In Game 2, a pair of RBIs from Michael Harris II gave the Braves a narrow victory as they evened the series headed to Atlanta. In Game 3, Yoshinobu Yamamoto pitched seven strong innings, and home runs from Teoscar Hernandez and 2021 Braves alum Freddie Freeman secured the victory for the Dodgers. In Game 4, the Braves struck first as Harris scored off a wild pitch from Tyler Glasnow, but the Dodgers scored four unanswered runs to take the lead for good, closing out the series.

With the win, the Dodgers improved to 4–2 against the Braves in the postseason, having previously won in 2013, 2018 and 2020.

== American League Championship Series ==
=== (1) Tampa Bay Rays vs. (2) Cleveland Guardians ===
Tampa Bay won the series, 4–2.

Game	Date	Score	Location	Time	Attendance
1	October 12	Cleveland Guardians – 7, Tampa Bay Rays – 3	Tropicana Field	2:57	35,361
2	October 13	Cleveland Guardians – 1 Tampa Bay Rays – 3	Tropicana Field	2:42	32,125
3	October 15	Tampa Bay Rays – 2, Cleveland Guardians – 3	Progressive Field	2:28	30,101
4	October 17	Tampa Bay Rays – 7, Cleveland Guardians – 3	Progressive Field	3:10	33,355
5	October 18	Tampa Bay Rays – 3, Cleveland Guardians – 1	Progressive Field	2:50	36,303
6	October 19	Cleveland Guardians – 3, Tampa Bay Rays – 7	Tropicana Field	2:55	40,230

This was the third postseason meeting between the Rays and Guardians (2013, 2022), and their first meeting outside of the Wild Card round. The Rays won in the former, and the Guardians swept in the latter. The Rays defeated the Guardians in six games to advance to the World Series for the first time since 2020.

Chase DeLauter hit a two-run RBI single in the top of the eighth to break a 2–2 tie as the Guardians stole Game 1 on the road. Freddy Peralta pitched six innings of shutout ball in Game 2 as the Rays evened the series headed to Cleveland. In Game 3, the Rays took a 2–1 lead in the top of the fourth off a two-run RBI triple from Chandler Simpson, but then Petey Halpin hit a two-run homer in the bottom of the fifth to put the Guardians in the lead for good as they regained the series lead. In Game 4, RBIs from Junior Caminero and Jonathan Aranda carried the Rays to victory as they evened the series at two. Drew Rasmussen pitched seven solid innings in Game 5 as the Rays took a 3–2 series lead headed back to St. Petersburg. In Game 6, a two-run RBI double from Richie Palacios and a pair of two-run homers from Caminero and Yandy Díaz would ultimately secure the pennant for the Rays. This was the first pennant the Rays won at home since 2008 (the ALCS in 2020 was played at a neutral site due to the COVID-19 pandemic).

Peralta was named the 2026 ALCS MVP after winning two games for the Rays. He pitched in twelve innings, three games total while giving up only one run and striking out nine batters.

== National League Championship Series ==
=== (1) Milwaukee Brewers vs. (2) Los Angeles Dodgers ===
Milwaukee won the series, 4–0.

Game	Date	Score	Location	Time	Attendance
1	October 11	Los Angeles Dodgers – 1, Milwaukee Brewers – 2	American Family Field	2:55	42,617
2	October 12	Los Angeles Dodgers – 4, Milwaukee Brewers – 7	American Family Field	3:21	42,516
3	October 14	Milwaukee Brewers – 6, Los Angeles Dodgers – 2	Dodger Stadium	3:02	50,708
4	October 15	Milwaukee Brewers – 6, Los Angeles Dodgers – 4	Dodger Stadium	2:54	49,105

This was the fourth postseason meeting between the Brewers and Dodgers (2018, 2020, 2025). The Dodgers won all three previous meetings, making it to the World Series all three times (the Dodgers are 2–1 in the World Series when beating Milwaukee en route, losing the first and winning the latter two). In one of the most unexpected twists in postseason history, the Brewers swept the two-time defending World Series champion Dodgers to advance to the World Series for the first time since 1982, ending what was the third longest pennant drought in the majors at the time (in the process denying a rematch of the 2020 World Series between the Dodgers and Rays).

The Brewers rallied to take Game 1 off a solo homer from Brice Turang and an RBI single from Luis Lara. In Game 2, the Brewers’ offense chased Yoshinobu Yamamoto from the mound after 2 2/3 innings pitched as they took a 2–0 series lead headed to Los Angeles, marking the shortest postseason start of Yamamoto’s career. In Game 3, the Dodgers took a 2–1 lead in the bottom of the sixth off a two-run RBI double from Will Smith, but the Brewers rallied with five unanswered runs off of home runs from Jake Bauers and Garrett Mitchell, a wild pitch thrown by Dodgers' reliever Justin Wrobleski, and an RBI single from Joey Ortiz, to take a commanding three-games-to-none series lead. In Game 4, the Dodgers took a 4–0 lead in the bottom of the second inning off a three-run homer from Shohei Ohtani, but the Brewers scored six unanswered runs to take the lead for good, securing their first National League pennant and exacting long-awaited revenge on the team that eliminated them three consecutive times. Bauers won the 2026 NLCS MVP, the first time for a Brewer, batting .286 in the series with a home run, a double, and six RBI.

With the sweep by the Brewers, 2026 marked the first time ever that both the Yankees and Dodgers were swept in the postseason. The Brewers became the fourth franchise to beat both the Dodgers and Angels in the postseason, joining the Baltimore Orioles, Boston Red Sox, and New York Yankees.

== 2026 World Series ==
=== (AL1) Tampa Bay Rays vs. (NL1) Milwaukee Brewers ===
Milwaukee won the series, 4–1.

Game	Date	Score	Location	Time	Attendance
1	October 23	Tampa Bay Rays 2, Milwaukee Brewers – 3	American Family Field	3:09	43,250
2	October 24	Tampa Bay Rays 4, Milwaukee Brewers – 5	American Family Field	3:38	43,245
3	October 26	Milwaukee Brewers – 10, Tampa Bay Rays – 1	Tropicana Field	3:00	40,388
4	October 27	Milwaukee Brewers – 3, Tampa Bay Rays – 4 (12)	Tropicana Field	4:20	40,514
5	October 28	Milwaukee Brewers – 4, Tampa Bay Rays – 1	Tropicana Field	3:05	40,489

This was the first World Series since 1980 to feature teams that had not won a championship before, the first since 2016 to not feature a team from Texas or California, the sixth to feature both #1 seeds from the American and National leagues (1995, 1999, 2013, 2020, 2024), and the fourth played between expansion teams (2015, 2019, 2023). The Brewers defeated the Rays in five games to win their first World Series championship in franchise history. This was the third straight World Series won by the National League.

In the first World Series game played in Milwaukee in 44 years, Jacob Misiorowski threw five solid innings as the Brewers narrowly prevailed despite having a game-winning double play overturned in the top of the ninth. In Game 2, Liam Hicks gave the Rays a 4-0 lead in the top of the first, but the Brewers rallied with five unanswered runs, capped off by an RBI single from Cooper Pratt, to take a 2–0 series lead headed to St. Petersburg. In Game 3, Robert Gasser pitched six innings of shutout ball as the Brewers blew out the Rays to take a commanding three games to none series lead. However, the Brewers weren’t out of the woods just yet. In a long and grueling Game 4, with the Brewers three outs away from the championship, the Rays rallied with RBIs from Jonny DeLuca and Ben Williamson in the bottom of the twelfth to avoid a sweep. Game 4 was notable for Jackson Chourio recording his tenth hit in the first four games of the World Series, tying the record set by Babe Ruth in 1928 despite the loss. However, that was all the Rays could manage. In Game 5, Misiorowski threw almost six shutout innings, and an RBI single from Pratt in the top of the second put the Brewers in the lead for good as they secured their first championship.

With the win, the Brewers brought Milwaukee its first World Series title since 1957, which was won by the Braves during their time as a Milwaukee team. They became the first NL Central team to win the World Series since the Chicago Cubs in 2016.

The Rays fell to 0–3 in the World Series, having previously lost in 2008 and 2020. The Rays became the first team to lose in their last three World Series appearances since the St. Louis Cardinals in 1985, 1987, and 2004.

== Broadcasting ==
=== Television coverage ===
NBC Sports covered the four Wild Card Series, with games split between the NBC broadcast network and NBCSN (two series each, one from each league), replacing ESPN/ABC. TBS and TruTV covered the American League Division Series and American League Championship Series. Fox Sports (either on the Fox broadcast network and/or FS1) have coverage of the National League Division Series and National League Championship Series. Two games aired exclusively on the Fox broadcast network (a single NLDS Game 1 and NLCS Game 1), with FS1 airing the remaining games in those series, Both networks aired NLCS Game 2.

The World Series air on the Fox broadcast network for the 27th consecutive year.

Spanish-language broadcasts are available on Universo for select NBC Sports games (and streaming on Peacock for games not on the channel), Fox Deportes for Fox Sports' games, and UniMás for TBS's games.

=== Streaming ===
Peacock streamed all four Wild Card Series. TBS's games is being available on HBO Max's ad-free tiers, while Fox Sports games is being available on Fox One.

=== Radio ===
ESPN Radio and TUDN Radio are airing the entire postseason in English and Spanish, respectively.
