= 2026 American League Division Series =

Teams
| Team (Wins) | | Manager | Season |
| Tampa Bay Rays (3) | | Kevin Cash | 98–64 (.605), GA: 4 1/2 |
| New York Yankees (0) | | Aaron Boone | 93–68 (.578), GB: 4 1/2 |
- Dates: October 3–7
- Television: TBS
- TV announcers: Brian Anderson, Jeff Francoeur, and Lauren Shehadi
- Radio: ESPN
- Radio announcers: Mike Couzens, Eduardo Pérez, and Tim Kurkjian
- Umpires: Dan Bellino (crew chief), Shane Livensparger, Ben May, Jeremie Rehak, D. J. Reyburn, Ryan Wills

Teams
| Team (Wins) | | Manager | Season |
| Cleveland Guardians (3) | | Stephen Vogt | 85–77 (.525), GA: 1 |
| Chicago White Sox (2) | | Will Venable | 84–78 (.519), GB: 1 |
- Dates: October 3–10
- Television: TBS
- TV announcers: Alex Faust, Ron Darling, and Lauren Jbara
- Radio: ESPN
- Radio announcers: Roxy Bernstein and Gregg Olson
- Umpires: Cory Blaser, Vic Carapazza, Tom Hanahan, Gabe Morales, Todd Tichenor (crew chief), Jansen Visconti
- ALWC: Chicago White Sox over Houston Astros (2–0); New York Yankees over Boston Red Sox (2–0)

The 2026 American League Division Series (ALDS) were the two best-of-five playoff series in Major League Baseball’s (MLB) 2026 postseason to determine the participating teams of the 2026 American League Championship Series (ALCS). These matchups were:

- (1) Tampa Bay Rays (AL East champions) vs. (4) New York Yankees (Wild Card Series winner): Rays won the series, 3–0.
- (2) Cleveland Guardians (AL Central champions) vs. (6) Chicago White Sox (Wild Card Series winner): Guardians won the series, 3–2.

The team with the better regular season record (higher seed) of each series hosted Games 1, 2, and (if necessary) 5, while the lower-seeded team hosted Game 3 and (if necessary) 4.

This was the first year all of the higher seeds won their Division Series match-up in the Wild Card Series era (2020, 2022–present).

== Background ==
The top two division winners (first two seeds) are determined by regular season winning percentages. The final two teams are the winner of the American League Wild Card Series, played between the league's third to sixth-seeded teams.

In their return season to Tropicana Field after roof damage from Hurricane Milton, the Tampa Bay Rays (98–64) clinched their first postseason berth since 2023 on September 11 after third baseman Junior Caminero hit a walk-off two-run home run against the Houston Astros for a 3–1 victory. They won their fifth American League East in franchise history, a first-round bye, and home-field advantage throughout the AL playoffs in the second half of a doubleheader against the New York Yankees on September 22. This is their sixth postseason appearance in the last eight seasons (2019–2023, 2026). They played against the fourth seed New York Yankees (93–68), who clinched their tenth postseason berth in the last twelve seasons (2015, 2017–2022, 2024–2026) on September 14 and defeated their rivals, the Boston Red Sox, in a two-game sweep in the American League Wild Card Series. This marked the second postseason meeting between the Rays and Yankees, following the 2020 ALDS, which was won by the Rays in five games. Tampa Bay won a close season series against New York, 7–6, with just three runs separating the AL East division rivals.

The Cleveland Guardians (85–76) clinched a postseason berth on September 24 via a 1–0 road victory against the Boston Red Sox, and won their third straight American League Central division title and first-round bye and second seed on September 26 when they beat the Kansas City Royals and Chicago White Sox lost to the Colorado Rockies. Like last season, the Guardians staged a dramatic season turnaround in a division in late August and September, overtaking the incumbent Chicago White Sox on the last week and a half of the season. This was Cleveland's eighth postseason appearance in the last 11 seasons (2016–2018, 2020, 2022, 2024–2026). They played the Chicago White Sox (84–78), who qualified for the postseason as the sixth seed wild card entrant on September 24; they then swept the Houston Astros in two games in the Wild Card Series to advance to the Division Series for the first time since 2021, which they were defeated by the same opponent in four games. This division series marked the first postseason meeting between the Guardians and the White Sox. Chicago won the regular season series 7–6 against Cleveland, with just one run separating the AL Central rivals and four walk-offs occurring during their contests.

== Matchups ==
=== Tampa Bay Rays vs. New York Yankees ===
Tampa Bay won the series, 3–0.

| Game | Date | Score | Location | Time | Attendance |
|---|---|---|---|---|---|
| 1 | October 3 | New York Yankees – 0, Tampa Bay Rays – 1 | Tropicana Field | 2:30 | 40,542 |
| 2 | October 5 | New York Yankees – 2, Tampa Bay Rays – 5 | Tropicana Field | 3:02 | 40,226 |
| 3 | October 7 | Tampa Bay Rays – 4, New York Yankees – 3 | Yankee Stadium | 3:04 | 48,865 |

=== Cleveland Guardians vs. Chicago White Sox ===
Cleveland won the series, 3–2.

| Game | Date | Score | Location | Time | Attendance |
|---|---|---|---|---|---|
| 1 | October 3 | Chicago White Sox – 3, Cleveland Guardians – 0 | Progressive Field | 2:49 | 34,287 |
| 2 | October 5 | Chicago White Sox – 4, Cleveland Guardians – 3 | Progressive Field | 3:16 | 32,050 |
| 3 | October 7 | Cleveland Guardians – 9, Chicago White Sox – 3 | Rate Field | 3:16 | 40,590 |
| 4 | October 8 | Cleveland Guardians – 9, Chicago White Sox – 5 | Rate Field | 3:39 | 39,920 |
| 5 | October 10 | Chicago White Sox – 0, Cleveland Guardians – 2 | Progressive Field | 2:36 | 36,889 |

== Tampa Bay vs. New York ==
This was the second postseason meeting between the Tampa Bay Rays and New York Yankees. Their first meeting occurred during the 2020 American League Division Series, which was played entirely at Petco Park due to the COVID-19 pandemic, and was won by Tampa Bay in five games.

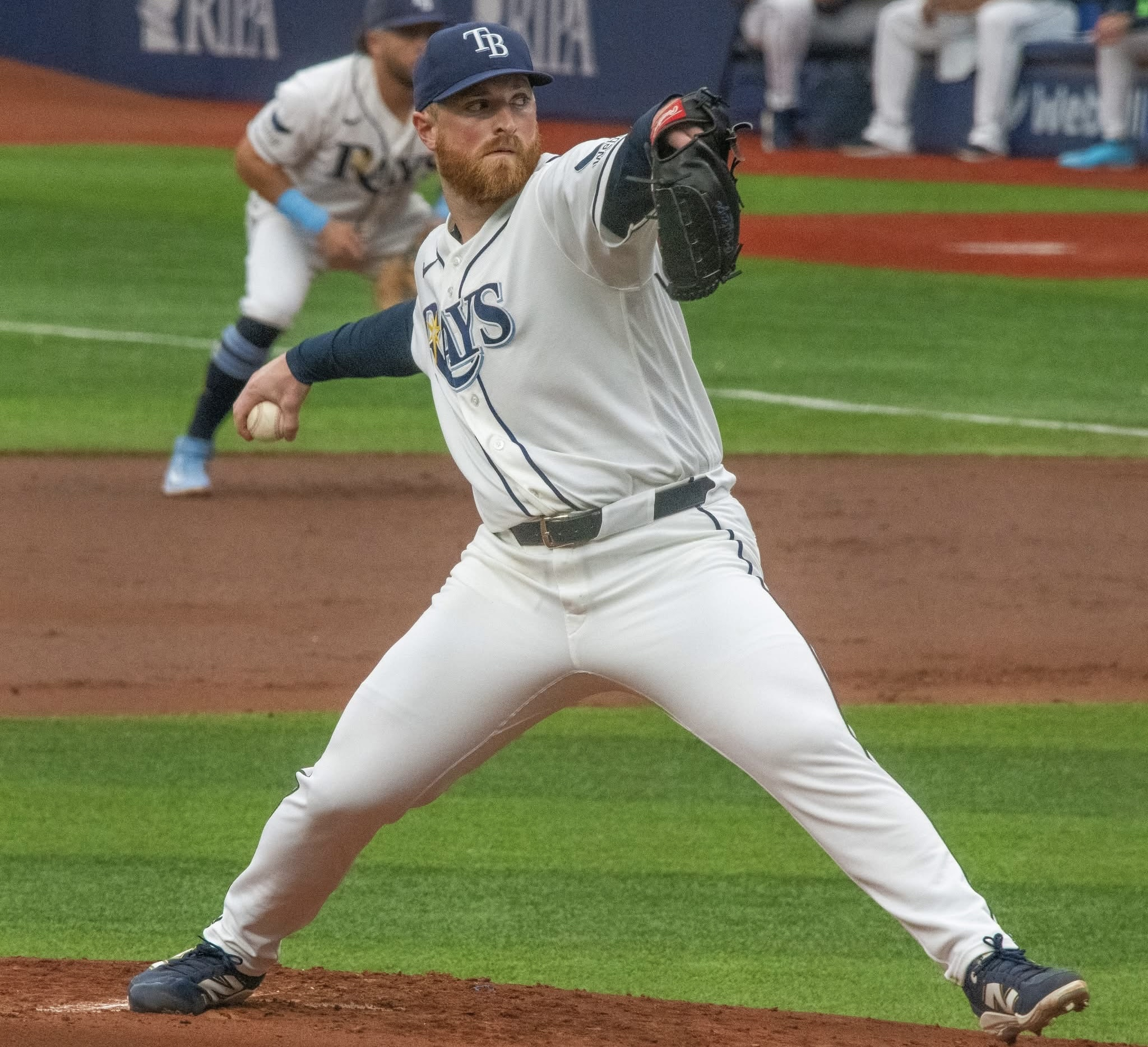
Rays' ace Drew Rasmussen had a no-hitter for 7 2/3 innings in his second career playoff start.

=== Game 1 ===
October 3, 2026 6:38 pm (EDT) at Tropicana Field in St. Petersburg, Florida 72 °F (22 °C), dome
| Team | 1 | 2 | 3 | 4 | 5 | 6 | 7 | 8 | 9 | R | H | E |
|---|---|---|---|---|---|---|---|---|---|---|---|---|
| New York | 0 | 0 | 0 | 0 | 0 | 0 | 0 | 0 | 0 | 0 | 1 | 0 |
| Tampa Bay | 0 | 0 | 1 | 0 | 0 | 0 | 0 | 0 | X | 1 | 5 | 0 |
WP: Drew Rasmussen (1–0) LP: Gerrit Cole (0–1) Sv: Bryan Baker (1); Home runs: NYY: None; TB: Jonathan Aranda (1); Attendance: 40,542; Boxscore

In the bottom of the third inning, Jonathan Aranda hit a solo home run off Gerrit Cole to get the Rays on the board 1–0. Cole, otherwise, pitched five innings, surrendering four other hits while striking out five. Ryan Weathers made his first appearance in relief, having not pitched since August 22, in a scoreless sixth, with the typical Yankees 2026 relievers, Paul Blackburn and Brent Headrick, pitching the other innings. In the top of the eighth inning with two outs, Austin Wells broke up Drew Rasmussen's no-hitter attempt with a double before being thrown out at third trying to stretch it into a triple. Rasmussen held the Yankees scoreless throughout eight innings, striking out ten batters over 101 pitches. Bryan Baker held the ninth inning scoreless with a one-run lead for a save, including striking out Giancarlo Stanton, who hit for the first time since April 24, to give the Rays a 1–0 series lead. This also ended Tampa Bay's seven game postseason losing streak.

This was the first time in franchise history the Yankees had one hit or fewer in a postseason game.

=== Game 2 ===
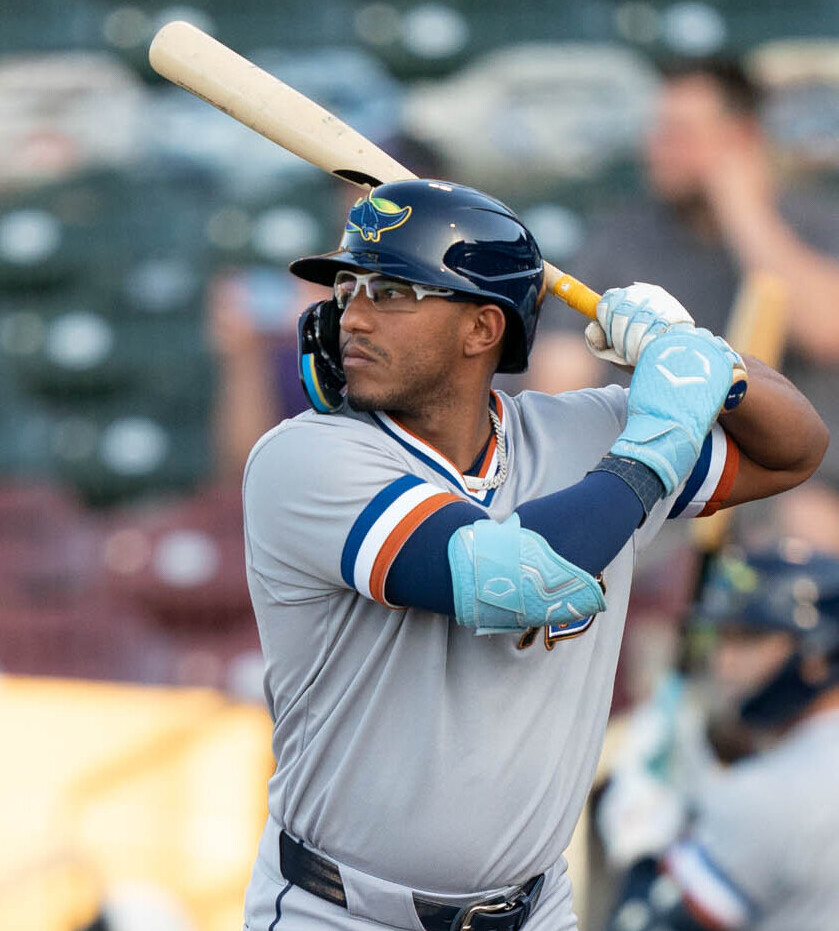
Richie Palacios led the Rays offense with two RBI and a run scored to help give the team a 5–1 lead.

October 5, 2026 8:10 pm (EDT) at Tropicana Field in St. Petersburg, Florida 72 °F (22 °C), dome
| Team | 1 | 2 | 3 | 4 | 5 | 6 | 7 | 8 | 9 | R | H | E |
|---|---|---|---|---|---|---|---|---|---|---|---|---|
| New York | 0 | 0 | 0 | 1 | 0 | 0 | 0 | 1 | 0 | 2 | 4 | 4 |
| Tampa Bay | 1 | 0 | 0 | 0 | 4 | 0 | 0 | 0 | X | 5 | 8 | 0 |
WP: Cam Booser (1–0) LP: Cam Schlittler (0–1) Sv: Bryan Baker (2); Home runs: NYY: Ben Rice 2 (2); TB: None; Attendance: 40,226; Boxscore

In the bottom of the first inning, a Ryan McMahon error allowed Yandy Díaz to reach first, followed by a Jonathan Aranda single. Junior Caminero grounded into a force out at second, but Jazz Chisholm Jr. threw the potential double play ball away, allowing Díaz to score the game's opening run for the Rays. Combined with a catcher's interference call against Austin Wells, the Yankees committed three errors in that single half-inning. The Yankees bounced back in the top of the fourth when Ben Rice hit a solo home run—his first of the series—to tie the game at 1–1.

Rays starting pitcher Freddy Peralta was replaced by Cam Booser in the top of the fifth after giving up a walk and a double with two outs. However, the Yankees failed to capitalize, leaving three runners stranded after Cody Bellinger flew out to deep center field. The Rays reclaimed the lead at 2–1 in the bottom of the fifth when Jonathan Aranda scored on an RBI fielder's choice by Liam Hicks following another defensive miscue. Junior Caminero then scored on an RBI infield single by Chandler Simpson (originally ruled an error on George Lombard Jr., but later changed to a fielder's choice), stretching the lead to 3–1 and chasing Yankees starter Cam Schlittler from the game in favor of Brent Headrick. Making his first career postseason start on the road, Schlittler pitched 4 1/3 innings, allowing seven hits and four runs (two earned) with two walks and two strikeouts. Following yet another error, this time charged to George Lombard Jr., the Rays blew the game open with two more runs in the inning when Richie Palacios hit an RBI single to bring home Jonny DeLuca and Chandler Simpson, making it 5–1.

In the top of the eighth, Ben Rice connected for his second solo home run of the game, trimming the Yankees' deficit to 5–2. Cam Booser earned the win after throwing just eight pitches for the Rays, while Bryan Baker pitched a scoreless ninth to pick up the save.

=== Game 3 ===
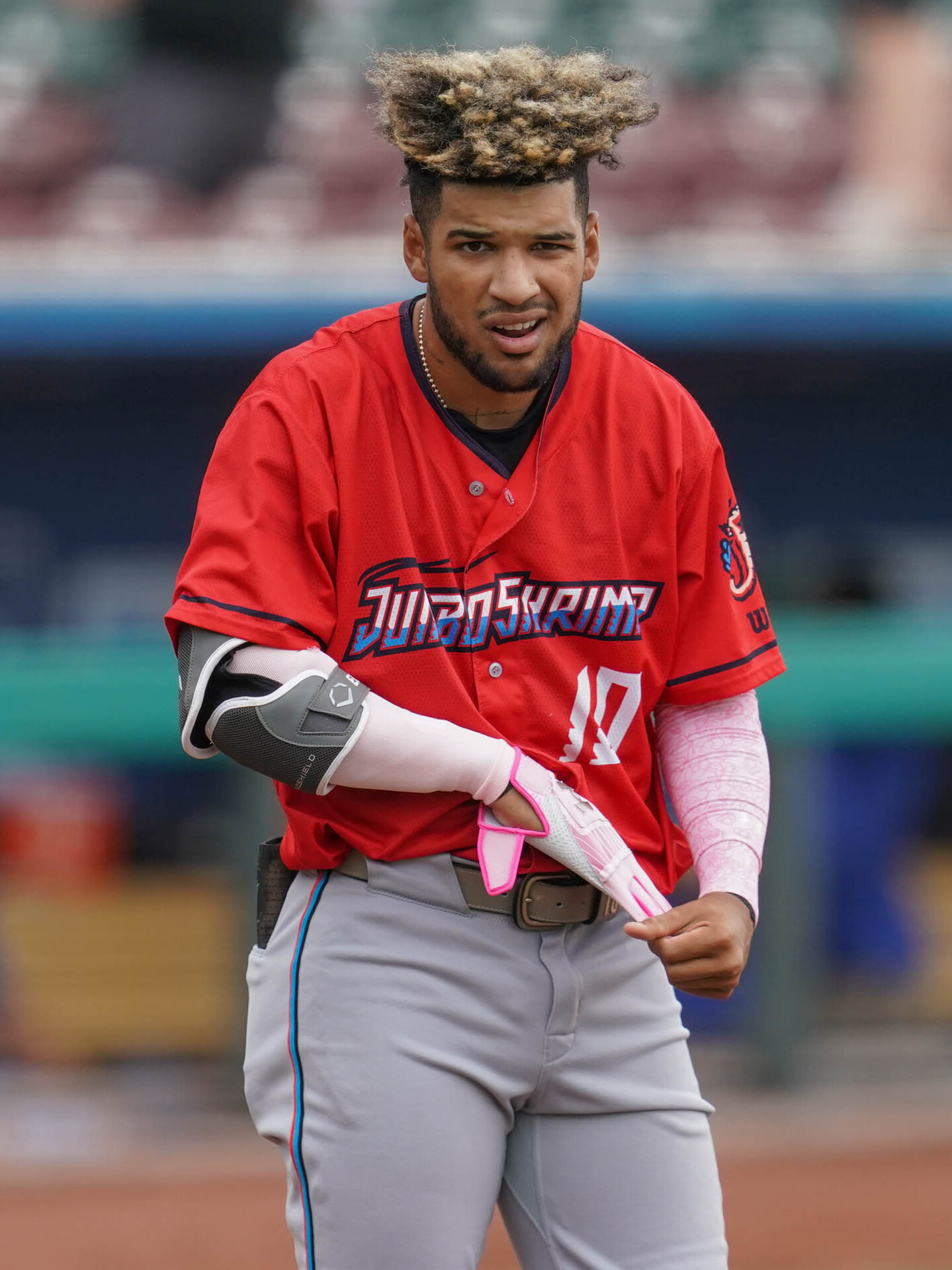
Víctor Mesa Jr. hit a go-ahead two-run home run in Game 3.

October 7, 2026 8:00 pm (EDT) at Yankee Stadium in The Bronx, New York 67 °F (19 °C), Clear
| Team | 1 | 2 | 3 | 4 | 5 | 6 | 7 | 8 | 9 | R | H | E |
|---|---|---|---|---|---|---|---|---|---|---|---|---|
| Tampa Bay | 0 | 0 | 1 | 1 | 0 | 2 | 0 | 0 | 0 | 4 | 7 | 1 |
| New York | 0 | 0 | 1 | 1 | 0 | 1 | 0 | 0 | 0 | 3 | 7 | 0 |
WP: Ian Seymour (1–0) LP: Max Fried (0–1) Sv: Bryan Baker (3); Home runs: TB: Ryan Vilade (1), Víctor Mesa Jr. (1); NYY: None; Attendance: 48,865; Boxscore

The Rays opened the scoring in the third inning when Jonathan Aranda singled, driving in Jonny DeLuca. In the bottom half of the frame, Ben Rice hit an RBI single off Nick Martinez, scoring Spencer Jones to tie the game at 1–1. Martinez was lifted after the play, having pitched 3 2/3 innings while allowing five hits and two runs with three strikeouts.

In the top of the fourth inning, Ryan Vilade hit a solo home run to put the Rays back ahead, 2–1. The Yankees answered in the home half when Jones doubled to score Anthony Volpe, knotting the game at two apiece.

The Rays broke the tie in the top of the sixth when Víctor Mesa Jr. hit a go-ahead, two-run home run to make it 4–2. The blast also knocked out Max Fried, who finished his night going 5 2/3 innings, surrendering seven hits and four runs while striking out seven.

In the bottom of the sixth, following a walk to George Lombard Jr., Volpe drove a ball to the left-field seats off Griffin Jax that was initially ruled a home run. However, the call was overturned to a double after an umpire review for fan interference, keeping the Rays ahead 4–3. The play drew comparisons to Derek Jeter's Jeffrey Maier-aided home run in Game 1 of the 1996 ALCS, which occurred before replay reviews existed.

In the bottom of the ninth, Bryan Baker secured his third save of the series by striking out Trent Grisham, completing a sweep of the Yankees. Advancing to their first 2026 American League Championship Series since 2020, the Rays will face the winner of the series between the Guardians and White Sox. Echoing Vlad Guerrero Jr.'s celebration from the previous year's ALDS, Junior Caminero taunted Yankees fans with a rendition of "Daaaa Yankees lose!" during postgame festivities.

=== Composite line score ===
2026 ALDS (3–0): Tampa Bay Rays beat New York Yankees

| Team | 1 | 2 | 3 | 4 | 5 | 6 | 7 | 8 | 9 | R | H | E |
|---|---|---|---|---|---|---|---|---|---|---|---|---|
| New York Yankees | 0 | 0 | 1 | 2 | 0 | 1 | 0 | 1 | 0 | 5 | 12 | 4 |
| Tampa Bay Rays | 1 | 0 | 2 | 1 | 4 | 2 | 0 | 0 | 0 | 10 | 20 | 1 |
Total attendance: 129,633 Average attendance: 43,211

== Cleveland vs. Chicago ==
This is the first postseason meeting between the Cleveland Guardians and the Chicago White Sox.

Munetaka Murakami hit his first career postseason home run in the 4th inning.

=== Game 1 ===
October 3, 2026 1:08 pm (EDT) at Progressive Field in Cleveland, Ohio 62 °F (17 °C), Partly Cloudy
| Team | 1 | 2 | 3 | 4 | 5 | 6 | 7 | 8 | 9 | R | H | E |
|---|---|---|---|---|---|---|---|---|---|---|---|---|
| Chicago | 0 | 0 | 0 | 2 | 0 | 0 | 1 | 0 | 0 | 3 | 6 | 0 |
| Cleveland | 0 | 0 | 0 | 0 | 0 | 0 | 0 | 0 | 0 | 0 | 3 | 0 |
WP: Bryan Hudson (1–0) LP: Parker Messick (0–1) Sv: Grant Taylor (1); Home runs: CWS: Munetaka Murakami (1); CLE: None; Attendance: 34,287; Boxscore

In the top of the fourth inning, Munetaka Murakami hit a two-run home run off Parker Messick—scoring Miguel Vargas ahead of him—to put the White Sox ahead 2–0. In the top of the seventh, Colson Montgomery drove in Kyle Teel with an RBI double, extending the White Sox's lead to 3–0. Grant Taylor then struck out the final four batters to secure the series-opening victory for the Pale Hose. The win marked the White Sox's first postseason shutout since Game 4 of the 2005 World Series.

=== Game 2 ===
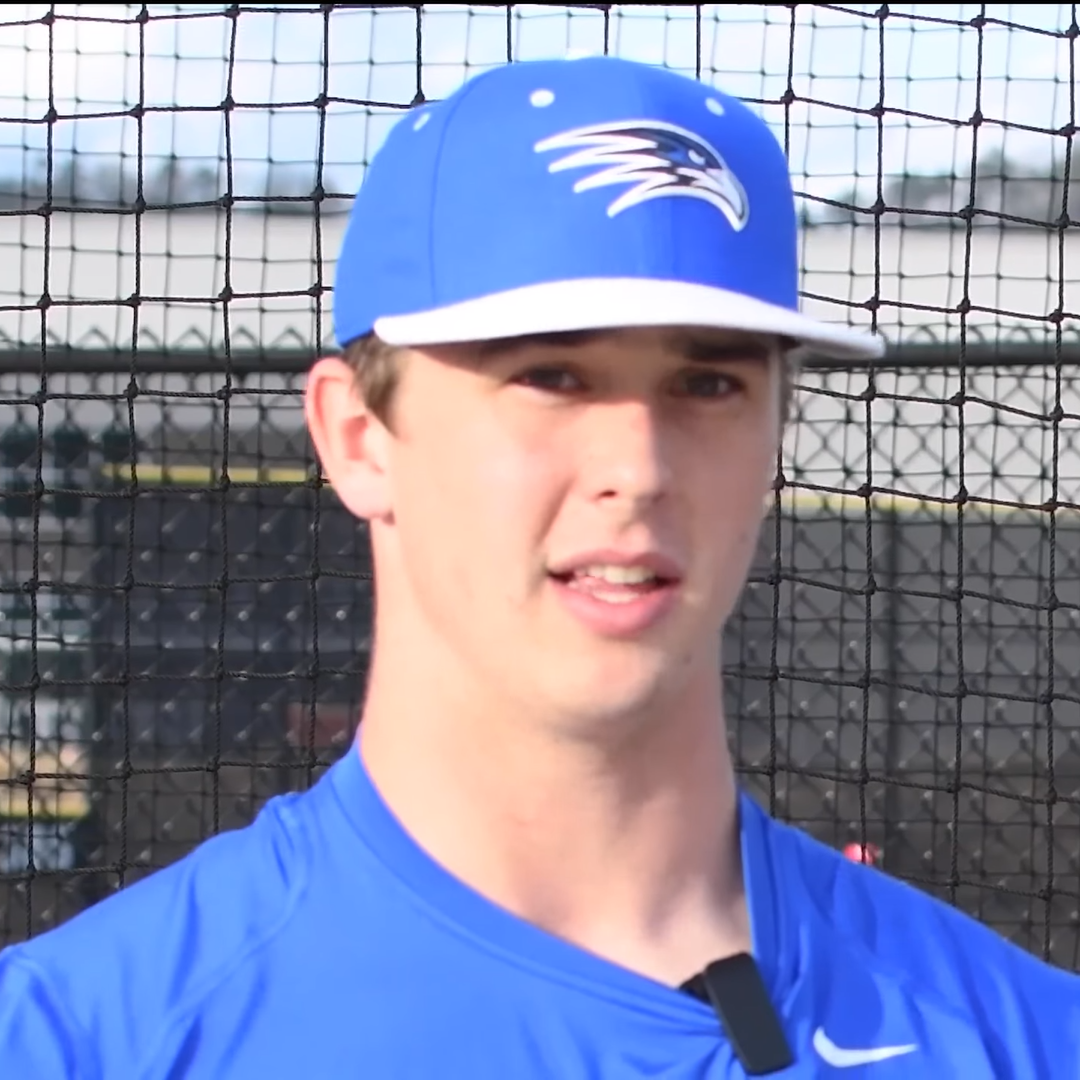
Grant Taylor earned his second save of the series to pick the White Sox one win away from the ALCS.

October 5, 2026 5:04 pm (EDT) at Progressive Field in Cleveland, Ohio 61 °F (16 °C), Mostly Clear
| Team | 1 | 2 | 3 | 4 | 5 | 6 | 7 | 8 | 9 | R | H | E |
|---|---|---|---|---|---|---|---|---|---|---|---|---|
| Chicago | 0 | 0 | 0 | 1 | 0 | 3 | 0 | 0 | 0 | 4 | 6 | 1 |
| Cleveland | 2 | 0 | 0 | 0 | 0 | 0 | 0 | 1 | 0 | 3 | 4 | 1 |
WP: Sean Burke (1–0) LP: Erik Sabrowski (0–1) Sv: Grant Taylor (2); Attendance: 32,050; Boxscore

Cleveland opened the scoring in Game 2 in the bottom of the first inning when Steven Kwan and José Ramírez both scored on a throwing error by White Sox pitcher Sean Newcomb, giving the Guardians an early 2–0 lead. The White Sox opened the game with Anthony Kay, who recorded only one out while allowing one hit, two runs (one earned), and one walk.

The White Sox scored their first run in the top of the fourth inning when Kyle Teel came home on an RBI single by Munetaka Murakami, cutting the deficit to one. Guardians starting pitcher Gavin Williams pitched five innings, allowing four hits and two runs while striking out 11 batters. The White Sox took the lead in the top of the sixth when Braden Montgomery hit a two-run double, followed by an RBI single from Chase Meidroth that scored Montgomery and widened the White Sox's lead to 4–2.

In the bottom of the eighth inning, Chase DeLauter scored on an RBI triple by Jo Adell, cutting the deficit back to a single run. Sean Burke pitched 5 1/3 innings, yielding just one hit and one run while striking out six batters, and Grant Taylor earned the save.

=== Game 3 ===
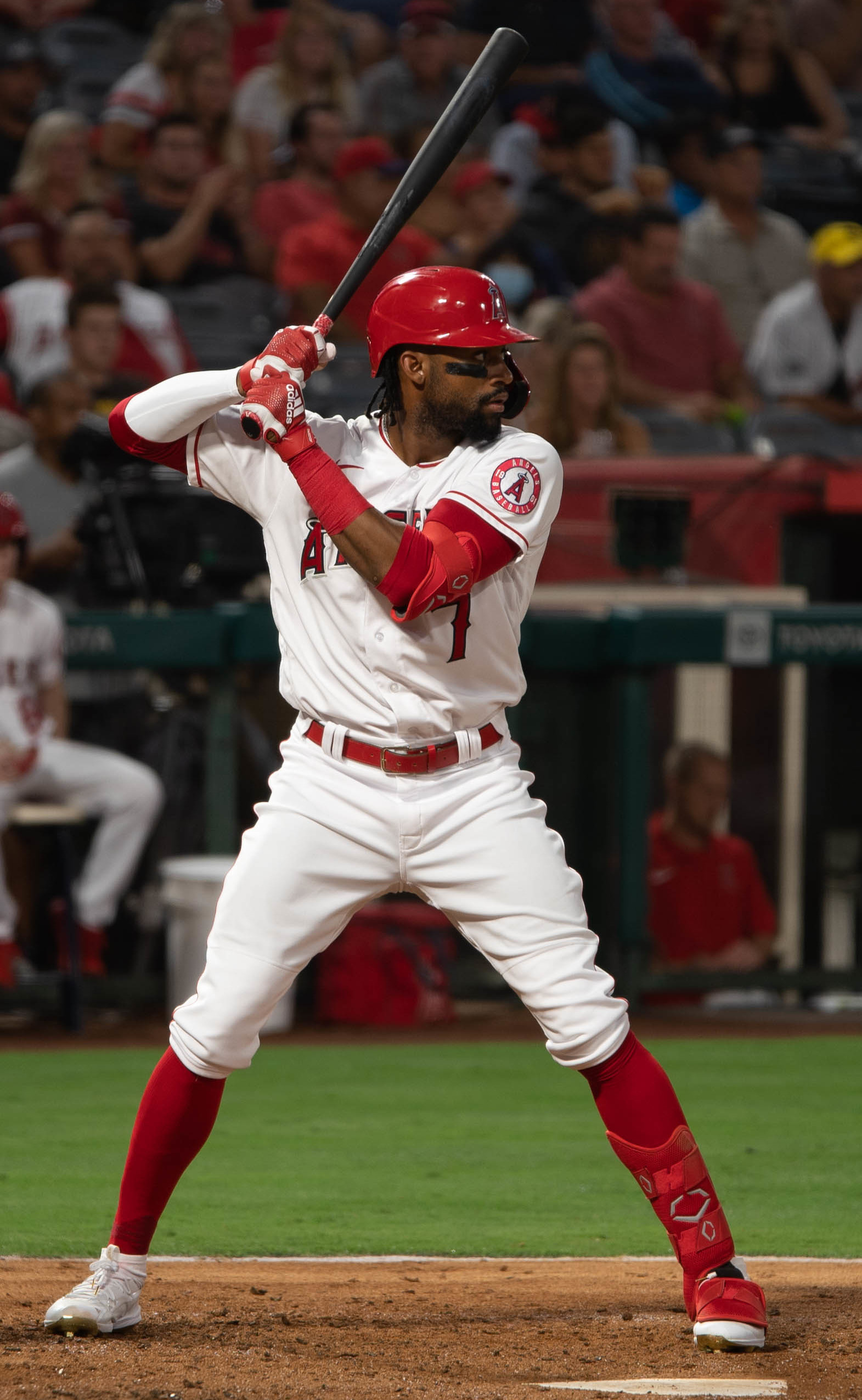
Jo Adell led the way for the Guardians going 2 for 4 with three RBI and extend the series.

October 7, 2026 3:07 pm (CDT) at Rate Field in Chicago, Illinois 75 °F (24 °C), Sunny
| Team | 1 | 2 | 3 | 4 | 5 | 6 | 7 | 8 | 9 | R | H | E |
|---|---|---|---|---|---|---|---|---|---|---|---|---|
| Cleveland | 0 | 0 | 4 | 0 | 1 | 0 | 0 | 2 | 2 | 9 | 11 | 0 |
| Chicago | 1 | 0 | 0 | 1 | 0 | 1 | 0 | 0 | 0 | 3 | 6 | 0 |
WP: Foster Griffin (1–0) LP: Bryan Hudson (1–1); Attendance: 40,590; Boxscore

The White Sox opened the scoring in the bottom of the first inning when Sam Antonacci scored off a Kyle Teel double into right field, giving Chicago an early 1–0 lead. Daniel Espino opened the game for the Guardians, faced five hitters and recorded only two outs. Espino gave up two hits, one run, and struck out two.

Sean Newcomb opened the game for the White Sox and pitched two innings, giving up one hit and no runs while striking out a batter. The Guardians scored in the top of the third inning to tie the game 1–1, when Travis Bazzana scored on an RBI single by Steven Kwan. Later in the third, the Guardians took the lead when Jo Adell's triple cleared the bases scoring Kwan, José Ramírez, and Chase DeLauter, giving them a 4–1 lead. In the bottom of the fourth inning, Chase Meidroth scored on an RBI double by Tristan Peters, cutting the White Sox deficit to 4–2.

In the visitor's half of the fifth, DeLauter's RBI fielder's choice scored Ramírez, extending the lead to 5–2. The White Sox loaded the bases in the bottom of the sixth inning and Braden Montgomery scored when Antonacci was hit by a pitch, cutting the White Sox deficit to 5–3. The Guardians added two more runs in the top of the eighth inning when Ramírez hit an RBI triple to score Travis Bazzana and Patrick Bailey, extending their lead to 7–3.

The Guardians continued to add to their lead in the top of the ninth with an RBI double by Ángel Genao that scored Nathaniel Lowe and an RBI single by Brayan Rocchio to score Petey Halpin for a 9–3 advantage. Cade Smith pitched two scoreless innings to end the game, giving up no hits and striking out five batters to help the Guardians force a Game 4.

=== Game 4 ===
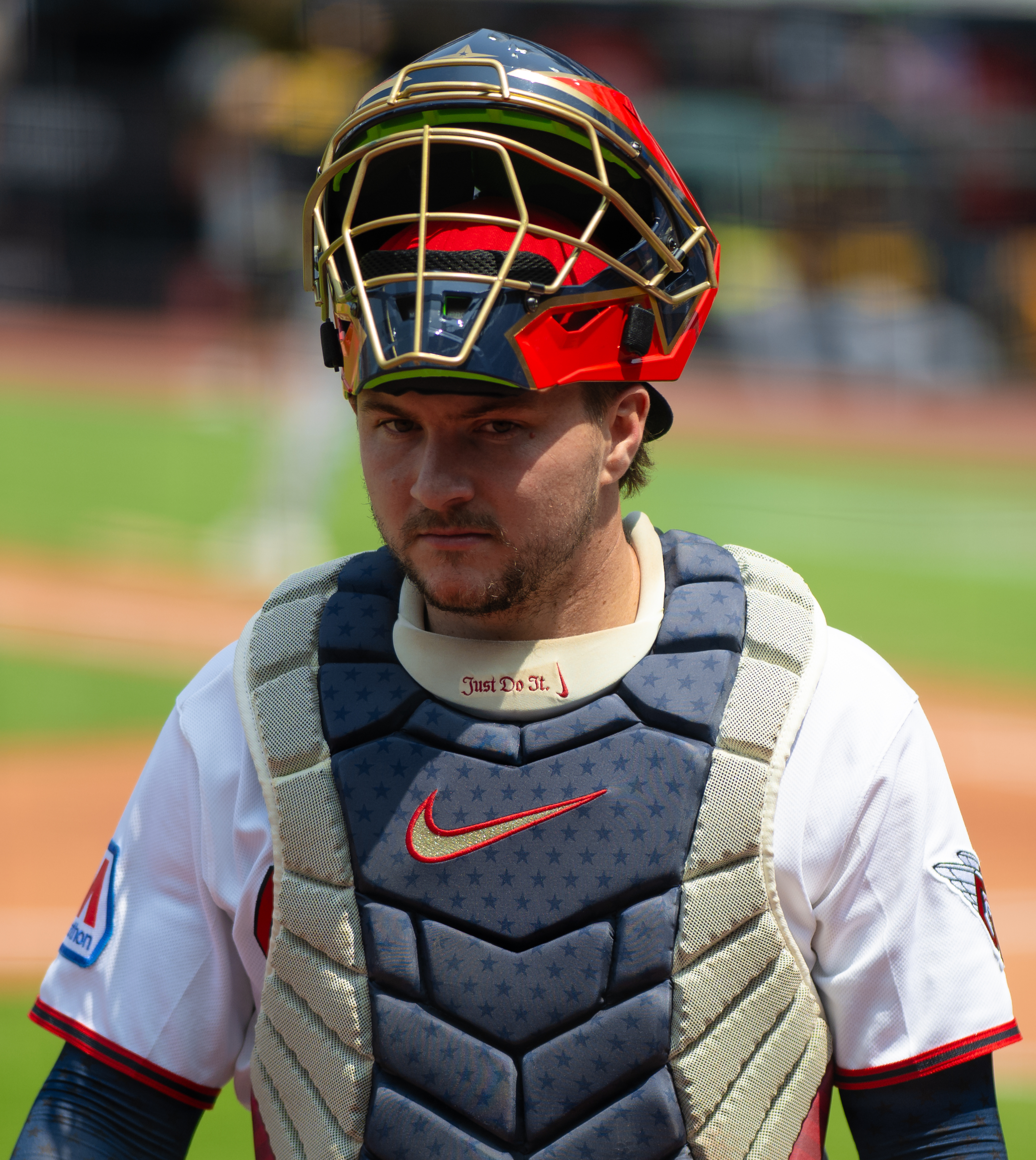
Off the bench, catcher Patrick Bailey hit the Guardians' first postseason home run in 2026 in the 5th inning.

October 8, 2026 7:00 pm (CDT) at Rate Field in Chicago, Illinois 65 °F (18 °C), Clear
| Team | 1 | 2 | 3 | 4 | 5 | 6 | 7 | 8 | 9 | R | H | E |
|---|---|---|---|---|---|---|---|---|---|---|---|---|
| Cleveland | 0 | 0 | 0 | 0 | 3 | 6 | 0 | 0 | 0 | 9 | 10 | 0 |
| Chicago | 0 | 0 | 2 | 0 | 2 | 0 | 0 | 0 | 1 | 5 | 8 | 0 |
WP: Erik Sabrowski (1–1) LP: Anthony Kay (0–1); Home runs: CLE: Patrick Bailey (1), José Ramírez (1); CWS: Miguel Vargas (1); Attendance: 39,920; Boxscore

The White Sox drew first blood in the bottom of the third when Munetaka Murakami worked a bases-loaded walk to score Colson Montgomery, followed by a Sam Antonacci sacrifice fly that brought home Chase Meidroth to extend the lead to 2–0. White Sox starter Parker Messick pitched 2 1/3 innings, allowing two runs on two hits with five strikeouts.

The Guardians surged ahead in the top of the fifth inning with a pair of home runs. Patrick Bailey launched a solo shot to narrow the gap to 2–1, before José Ramírez hit a go-ahead, two-run homer to push Cleveland in front, 3–2.

Chicago answered in the bottom of the fifth, regaining the lead at 4–3. Antonacci was hit by a pitch with the bases loaded to score Meidroth and tie the game, and Brenton Doyle followed with a sacrifice fly to drive in Miguel Vargas.

Cleveland broke the game wide open in the top of the sixth, sending ten batters to the plate as they batted around to take a 9–4 lead. Travis Bazzana initiated the rally with an RBI double to score Ángel Martínez and tie the game at 4–4. Bailey followed with an RBI single to score Bazzana, and Ramírez added a run-scoring fielder's choice to bring in Bailey. Chase DeLauter then drove in Brayan Rocchio with a single before Jo Adell capped the five-run frame with a two-run single.

The Guardians held that 9–4 cushion into the bottom of the ninth, where Vargas hit a lead-off solo home run off closer Cade Smith. Cleveland ace Gavin Williams—who was originally scheduled to start Game 5—came on to finish the frame, inducing a line-out from Braden Montgomery to seal the 9–5 victory and tie the series at two games apiece.

With the loss, the White Sox missed an opportunity to secure their first postseason series clinch at home since 1906.

=== Game 5 ===
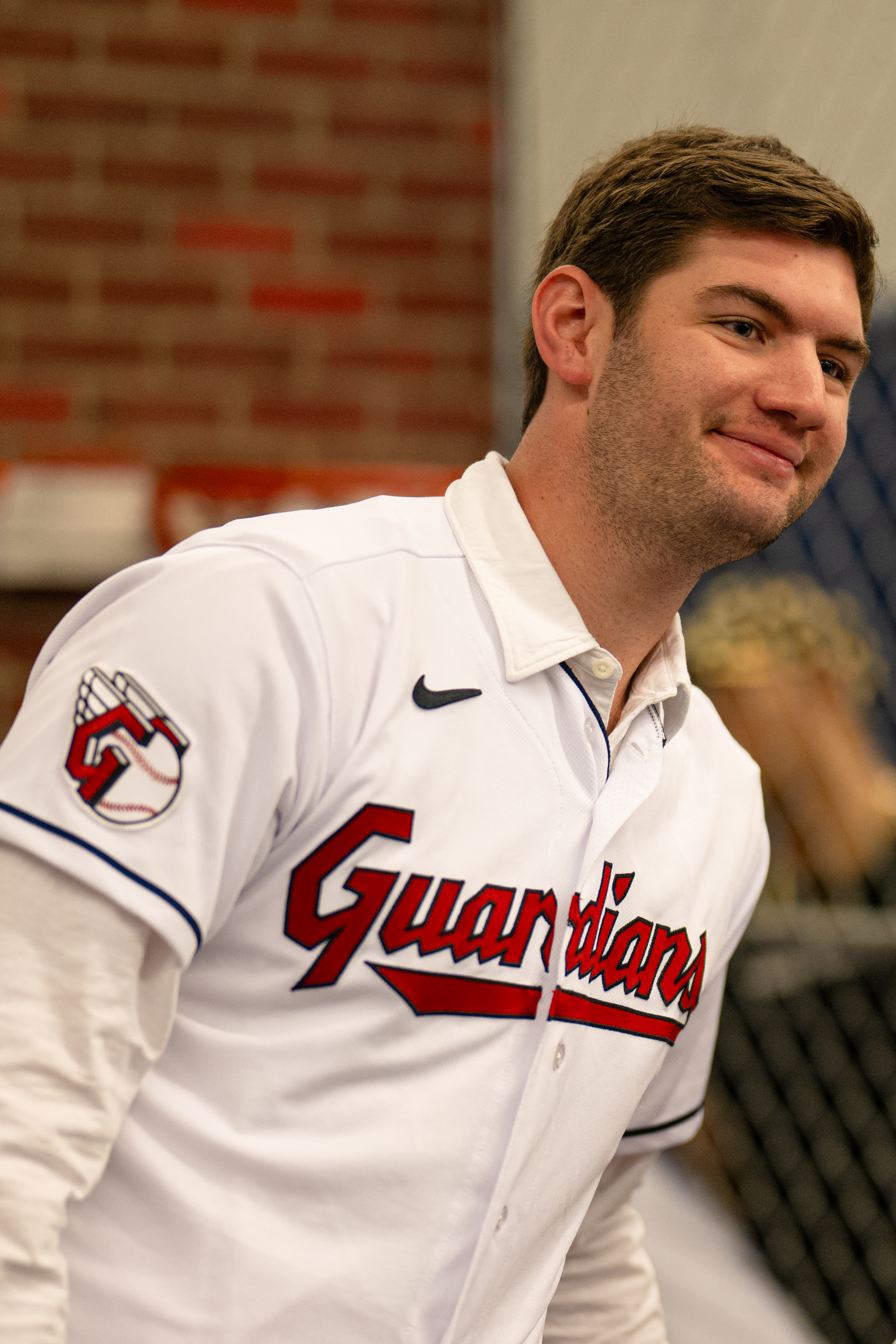
Gavin Williams pitched a no-hitter through 5 2/3 innings and struck out 12 batters.

October 10, 2026 8:00 pm (EDT) at Progressive Field in Cleveland, Ohio 65 °F (18 °C), Drizzle
| Team | 1 | 2 | 3 | 4 | 5 | 6 | 7 | 8 | 9 | R | H | E |
|---|---|---|---|---|---|---|---|---|---|---|---|---|
| Chicago | 0 | 0 | 0 | 0 | 0 | 0 | 0 | 0 | 0 | 0 | 3 | 1 |
| Cleveland | 0 | 0 | 0 | 2 | 0 | 0 | 0 | 0 | X | 2 | 6 | 0 |
WP: Gavin Williams (1–0) LP: Sean Burke (1–1) Sv: Cade Smith (1); Home runs: CWS: None; CLE: José Ramírez (2); Attendance: 36,889; Boxscore

The Guardians struck first in the bottom of the fourth inning when José Ramírez hit a two-run home run off the lowest pitch hit for a home run (since pitch heights were tracked) in postseason history. Sean Burke started for Chicago, allowing two runs on four hits while striking out four over five innings.

Cleveland starter Gavin Williams carried a no-hitter into the sixth inning, finishing with 5 2/3 scoreless frames of one-hit ball and striking out 12 batters to tie Charles Nagy's single-game franchise postseason record from 1996. Across his two series outings, Williams accumulated 24 strikeouts—one shy of Gerrit Cole's ALDS record set in 2019. Williams departed after leaving the bases loaded with two outs in the top of the sixth, but reliever Erik Sabrowski struck out Munetaka Murakami to escape the jam and preserve the two-run lead.

Chicago was held scoreless to complete the shutout as White Sox batters struck out 21 times—a major league record for any nine-inning regular season or postseason game. The performance eclipsed the previous nine-inning mark of 19 strikeouts, set by Chicago just two games prior. Both Murakami and Andrew Benintendi suffered golden sombreros with four strikeouts each.

With the 2–0 victory, Cleveland rallied from an 0–2 series deficit to advance, becoming the first team to complete a 2–0 ALDS comeback since the New York Yankees did so against Cleveland in the 2017 ALDS.

=== Composite line score ===
2026 ALDS (3–2): Cleveland Guardians beat Chicago White Sox

| Team | 1 | 2 | 3 | 4 | 5 | 6 | 7 | 8 | 9 | R | H | E |
|---|---|---|---|---|---|---|---|---|---|---|---|---|
| Chicago White Sox | 1 | 0 | 2 | 4 | 2 | 4 | 1 | 0 | 1 | 15 | 29 | 2 |
| Cleveland Guardians | 2 | 0 | 4 | 2 | 4 | 6 | 0 | 3 | 2 | 23 | 34 | 1 |
Total attendance: 183,736 Average attendance: 36,747

== See also ==
- 2026 National League Division Series
