= Garrett Crochet =

American baseball player (born 1999)

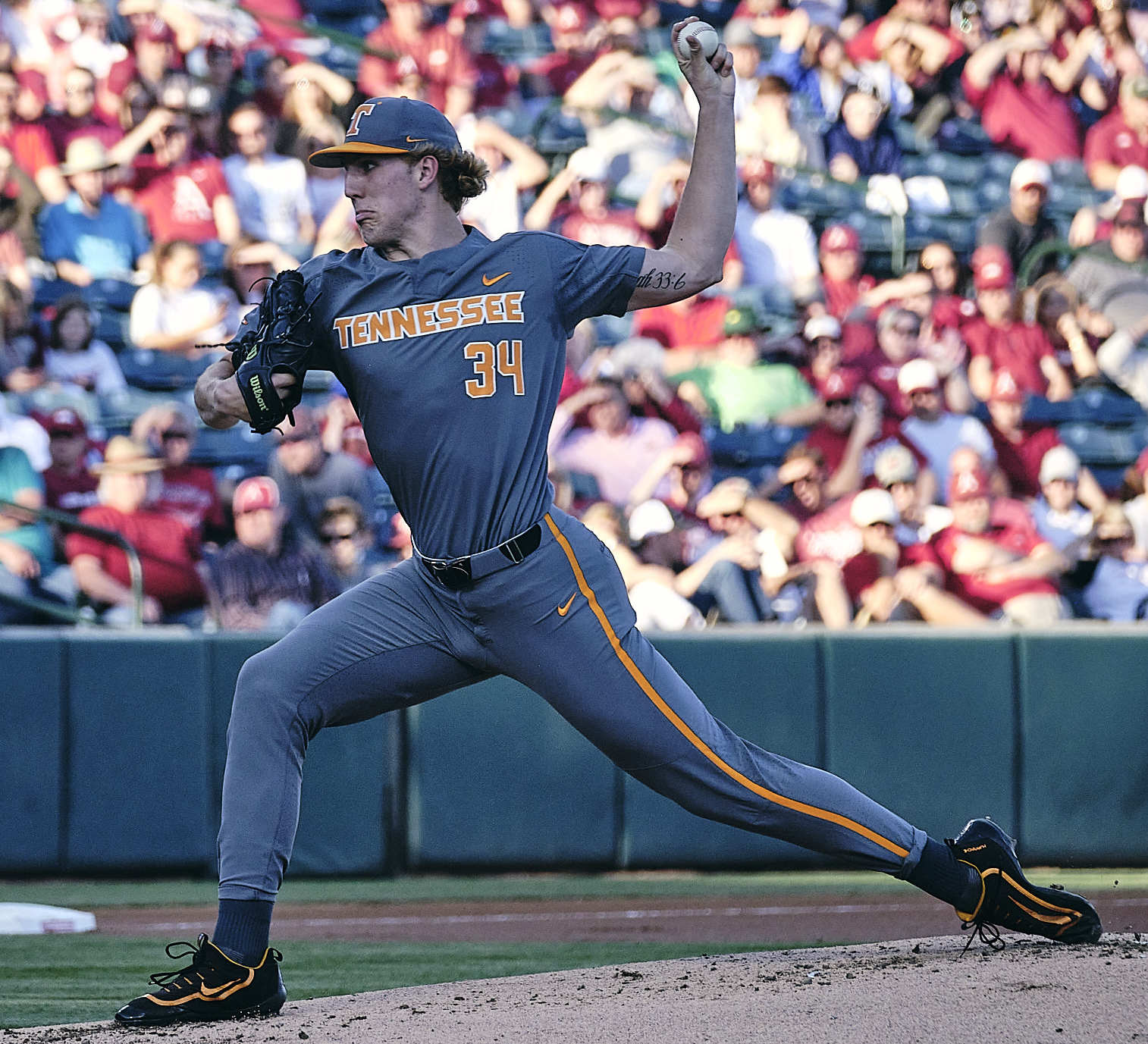
- Crochet pitching for Tennessee in 2019

Boston Red Sox – No. 35
- Pitcher
- Born: June 21, 1999 (age 27); Ocean Springs, Mississippi, U.S.
- Bats: Left Throws: Left

MLB debut
- September 18, 2020, for the Chicago White Sox

MLB statistics (through 2026 season)
- Win–loss record: 30–27
- Earned run average: 3.17
- Strikeouts: 586
- Stats at Baseball Reference

Teams
- Chicago White Sox (2020–2021, 2023–2024); Boston Red Sox (2025–present)

Career highlights and awards
- 2× All-Star (2024, 2025); All-MLB First Team (2025); AL Comeback Player of the Year (2024); MLB strikeout leader (2025)

Garrett Nolan Crochet (/kroʊˈʃeɪ/; born June 21, 1999) is an American professional baseball pitcher for the Boston Red Sox of Major League Baseball (MLB). He previously played for the Chicago White Sox.

Crochet played college baseball for the Tennessee Volunteers and was selected by the White Sox with the 11th overall selection of the 2020 MLB draft. He was called up in September 2020 by the White Sox, the first MLB player in six years to reach the big leagues the same year he was drafted. Crochet was named an All-Star in 2024 and 2025.

== Amateur career ==
Crochet grew up in Ocean Springs, Mississippi, and attended Ocean Springs High School. During his junior season, he posted a 3–0 win–loss record with a 0.51 earned run average (ERA) and 25 strikeouts in 27 2/3 innings pitched. Following the season, Crochet initially committed to play college baseball at Jones County Junior College. As a senior, he went 6–4 with a 1.48 ERA and 76 strikeouts to draw late recruiting interest from many top collegiate programs, including Texas and Tennessee. Crochet was selected by the Milwaukee Brewers in the 34th round of the 2017 Major League Baseball draft, but chose not to sign and instead enrolled at Tennessee.

As a true freshman at Tennessee in 2018, Crochet appeared in 17 games with 11 starts, posting a 5–6 record with a 5.51 ERA and 62 strikeouts. In 2019, his sophomore year, he went 5–3 with a 4.02 ERA over 18 appearances (six starts), missing the SEC Tournament after suffering a broken jaw in his last regular season start. After the season Crochet was invited to training camp for the United States Collegiate National Baseball Team, and entered his junior season as a first team preseason All-American by Baseball America and on the watch list for the Golden Spikes Award. Crochet missed the first three weeks of the season due to arm soreness, then appeared in one game before the college baseball season was cut short due to the COVID-19 pandemic.

== Professional career ==
=== Chicago White Sox (2020–2024) ===
The White Sox selected Crochet in the first round, 11th overall, in the 2020 Major League Baseball draft, and he signed a contract on June 22, 2020, that included a $4,547,500 bonus.

On September 18, 2020, Crochet became the first player from the 2020 MLB Draft class to be promoted to the major leagues. He is the 22nd player to go straight from the draft to the majors without playing in the minor leagues (the first since Mike Leake in 2010) and was the first player to be promoted in their draft year since Brandon Finnegan in 2014. With the 2020 Chicago White Sox, Crochet appeared in five games, not allowing a run in six innings pitched while consistently throwing 100 miles per hour (160 km/h). He came out of the bullpen to strike out both batters he faced in Chicago's 6–4 loss to the Oakland Athletics in the decisive Game 3 of the 2020 American League Wild Card Series before leaving with forearm tightness. Crochet had his first full season in 2021, when he recorded a 2.82 ERA with 65 strikeouts in 54 1/3 innings. He would miss the entire 2022 season after undergoing Tommy John surgery on April 2.

In 2023, Crochet made his return from surgery, appearing in 13 games and recording a 3.55 ERA with 12 strikeouts across 12 2/3 innings pitched.

On March 18, 2024, Crochet was named the White Sox Opening Day starting pitcher despite having never started a major league game before. In his first start, Crochet went 6 innings giving up 5 hits, one run, and striking out 8 batters in a 1–0 loss to the Detroit Tigers. He was named MLB Pitcher of the Month for June that year, becoming the 17th White Sox pitcher to do so. In June, Crochet went 1–1 with an ERA of 1.91 with a 0.93 WHIP in 37 2/3 innings while striking out 56 batters in six starts. On July 7, Crochet would be named to his first All-Star Game in his career. In the first half of the season, Crochet was 6–6 with an 3.02 ERA and a WHIP of 0.95 in 20 starts in 107 1/3 innings, while leading the league in strikeouts with 150 and strikeouts per 9 innings at 12.6.

Crochet made 32 starts for the White Sox in 2024, posting a 3.58 ERA with 209 strikeouts across 146 innings pitched, setting a new career high. After the season, he was named AL Comeback Player of the Year.

=== Boston Red Sox (2025–present) ===
On December 11, 2024, Crochet was traded to the Boston Red Sox for prospects Kyle Teel, Braden Montgomery, Chase Meidroth, and Wikelman González.

On March 27, 2025, Crochet was named the Red Sox Opening Day starting pitcher. In his first start, Crochet went five innings, giving up five hits, two runs, and striking out four batters in a 5–2 victory against the Texas Rangers. On March 31, it was reported that Crochet and the Red Sox agreed to a six-year contract extension worth $170 million. On June 1, Crochet went seven innings, throwing a career-high 112 pitches, giving up five hits, one run, walking two batters, and striking out a season-high 12 batters in a 3–1 victory against the Atlanta Braves. On July 6, Crochet was named to the 2025 All-Star Game roster, his second consecutive AL All-Star selection. On July 12, Crochet threw his first career complete game shutout in a 1–0 victory over the Tampa Bay Rays. On August 23, Crochet recorded his 500th strikeout when he struck out José Caballero in the seventh inning in a 12–1 victory over the New York Yankees. On September 25, Crochet struck out George Springer to begin his start against the Toronto Blue Jays, becoming the first pitcher to reach 250 strikeouts in 2025. Crochet pitched eight innings, only allowing three hits and striking out six batters in a 7-1 victory over the Blue Jays. Crochet made 32 starts for the Red Sox in 2025, posting a 18–5 record and a 2.59 ERA with 255 strikeouts across 205 1/3 innings pitched, setting a new career-high in strikeouts and innings pitched.

In Game 1 of the 2025 American League Wild Card Series against the Yankees, Crochet pitched 7 2/3 innings as he allowed four hits and one earned run while striking out 11 Yankee batters in his first career postseason start. The Red Sox won the game 3–1.

On April 13, 2026, Crochet endured one of the worst outings of his career as he allowed 11 runs in 1 2/3 innings against the Minnesota Twins. On April 29, Crochet was placed on the injured list due to left shoulder inflammation. On May 31, his throwing progression was halted due to an injury setback. Crochet was subsequently diagnosed with a low–grade lat strain. Despite not making another regular season appearance, Crochet was named to the Red Sox roster for the 2026 AL Wild Card Series against the Yankees as a reliever. Crochet would return to game action in Game 2 of the series in the sixth inning. Despite striking out Spencer Jones, the first batter he faced, strike 3 got away and Jones reached. From there, the appearance would unravel, with Crochet not recording an out and giving up four earned runs before getting pulled. The Red Sox would lose Game 2 and the series, ending the season for Crochet and the team.

== See also ==
- List of baseball players who went directly to Major League Baseball
