= Chandler Simpson =

American baseball player (born 2000)

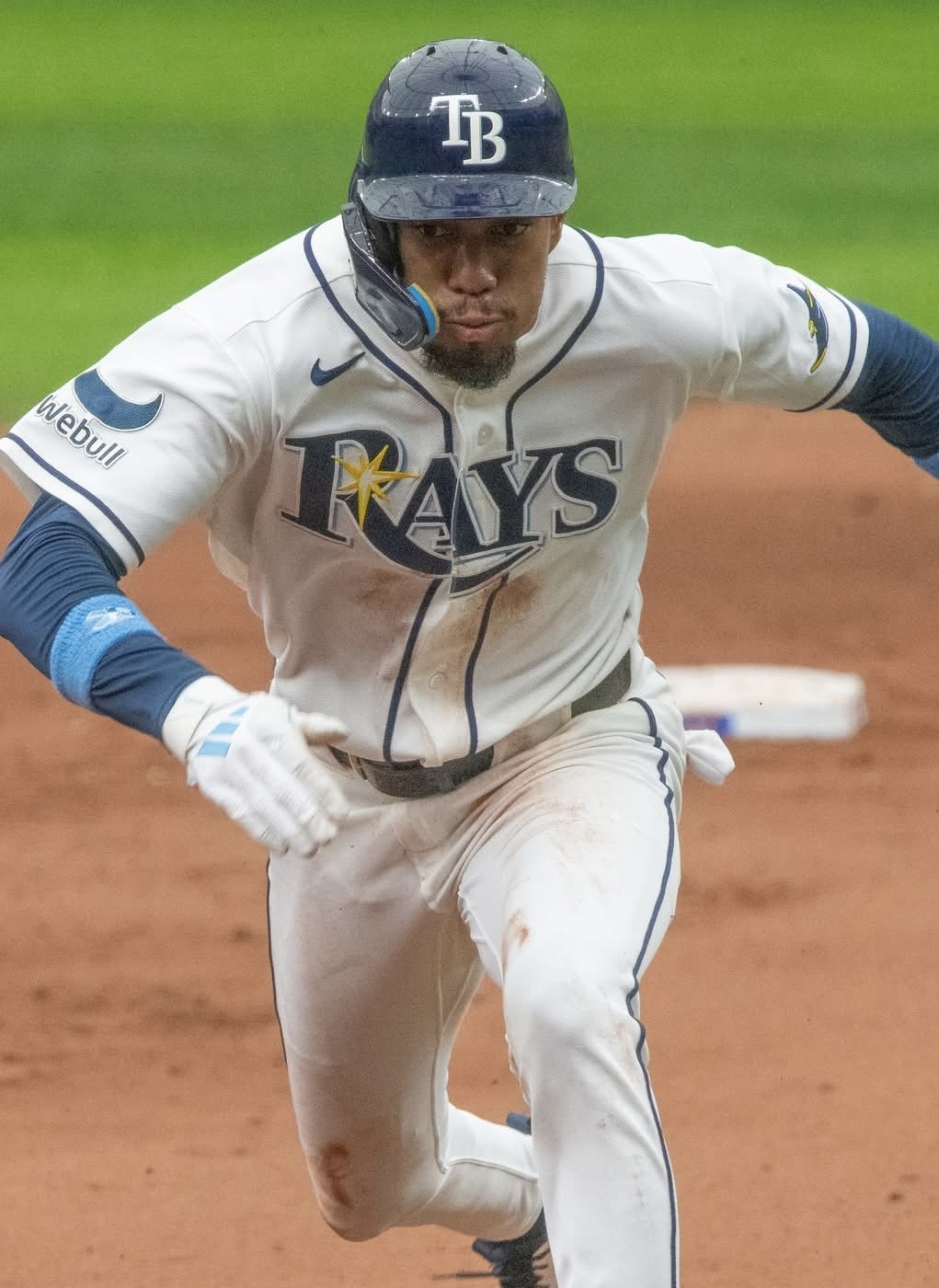
- Simpson with the Tampa Bay Rays in 2026

Tampa Bay Rays – No. 14
- Outfielder
- Born: November 18, 2000 (age 25); Atlanta, Georgia, U.S.
- Bats: Left Throws: Right

MLB debut
- April 19, 2025, for the Tampa Bay Rays

MLB statistics (through 2026 season)
- Batting average: .302
- Home runs: 0
- Runs batted in: 64
- Stolen bases: 90
- Stats at Baseball Reference

Teams
- Tampa Bay Rays (2025–present)

Career highlights and awards
- AL stolen base leader (2026)
Medals
Men's baseball
Representing United States
WBSC Premier12
Bronze medal – third place	2024 Tokyo	Team

Chandler Lenard Simpson (born November 18, 2000) is an American professional baseball outfielder for the Tampa Bay Rays of Major League Baseball (MLB). He made his MLB debut in 2025.

== Amateur career ==
Simpson attended St. Pius X High School in Atlanta, Georgia, hitting .450 as a senior in 2019. He received one offer to play college baseball at the NCAA Division I level, from the University of Alabama, Birmingham (UAB).

During the 2019 summer after graduating from high school, but before attending UAB, Simpson played for the Brookhaven Bucks in the Sunbelt Baseball League. He helped the Bucks win a second consecutive league championship, leading the team in batting average (.402), triples (4), and On Base Percentage (.471).

He entered his true freshman season as the starting shortstop for the UAB Blazers, and played 14 games before it was cut short due to the coronavirus pandemic. Simpson batted .288 and stole 24 bases in 27 attempts as a redshirt freshman.

After the season he transferred to Georgia Tech to play for the Georgia Tech Yellow Jackets. In his only season playing for the Yellow Jackets, Simpson led Division I with a .434 batting average. In 2021, he played summer league baseball for the Fond du Lac Dock Spiders of the Northwoods League. After the 2022 season he played with the Cotuit Kettleers of the Cape Cod Baseball League.

== Professional career ==
=== Draft and minor leagues ===
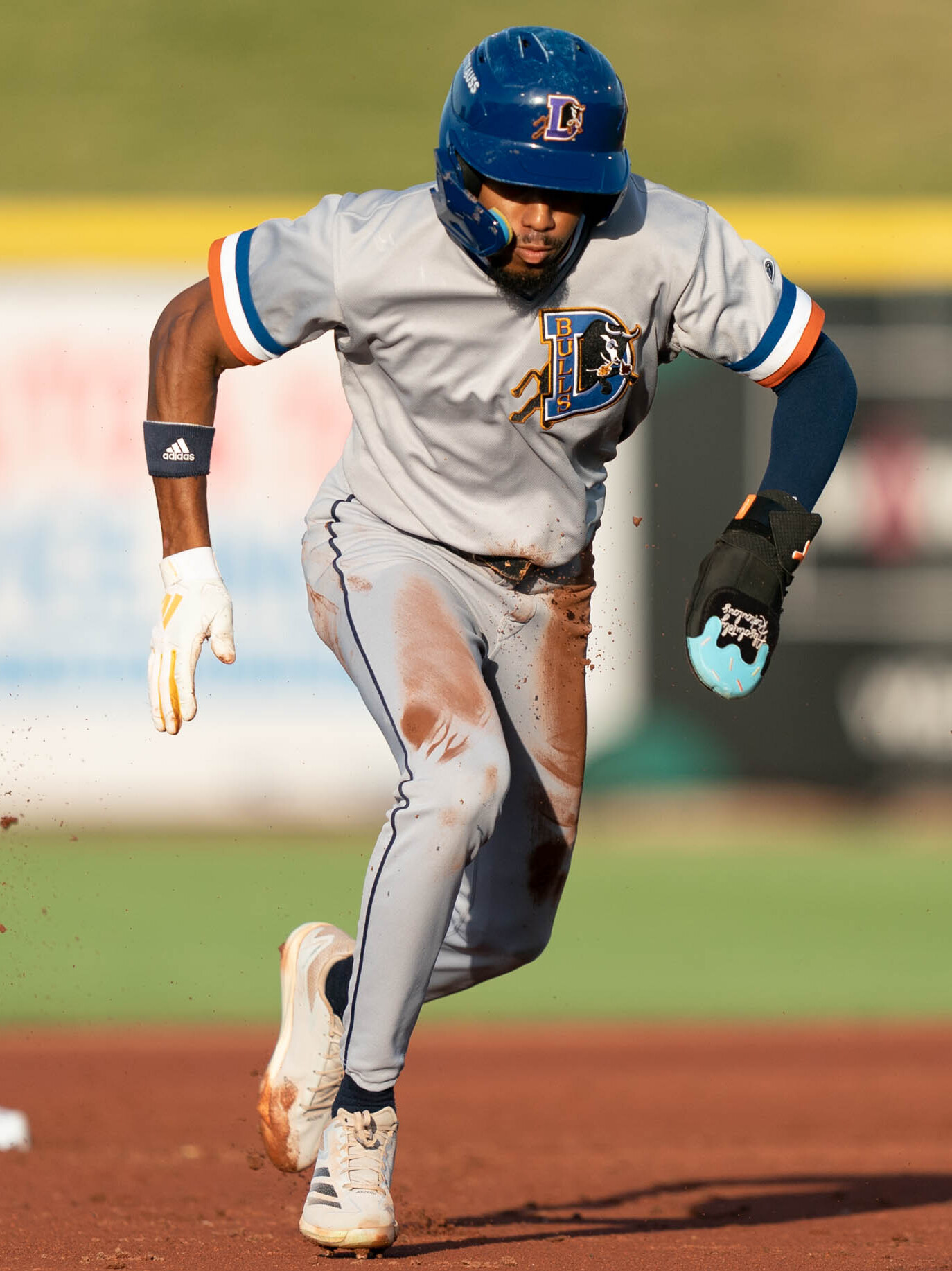
Simpson with the Durham Bulls in 2025

The Tampa Bay Rays selected Simpson in the Competitive Balance section of the second round of the 2022 Major League Baseball draft. He was assigned to the Florida Complex League Rays after signing with the team and batted .370 with eight stolen bases in eight attempts in eight games played.

Simpson split the 2023 season between the Single-A Charleston RiverDogs and High-A Bowling Green Hot Rods. In 115 appearances for the two affiliates, he batted .293/.373/.345 with no home runs, 31 RBI, and a league-leading 94 stolen bases (tied with Victor Scott II). In 2024, Simpson made 110 appearances split between Bowling Green and the Double-A Montgomery Biscuits, batting a combined .355/.410/.397 with one home run, 29 RBI, and a league-leading 104 stolen bases (becoming the first player since Billy Hamilton in 2012 to achieve the feat).

=== Tampa Bay Rays ===
==== 2025 ====
Simpson began the 2025 season with the Triple-A Durham Bulls. On April 18, 2025, Simpson was selected to the 40-man roster and promoted to the major leagues for the first time. He made his major league debut the following day and recorded his first hit and RBI, a double off of pitcher Devin Williams to score José Caballero in the bottom of the 9th inning. The Rays would go on to defeat the New York Yankees 10-8 in extra innings.

On July 19, Simpson extended a hitting streak to 18 consecutive games, which set a new standard for Rays rookies, beating Rocco Baldelli and Delmon Young who had previously held the mark at 13. Across 109 games for the Rays in 2025, Simpson batted .295/.326/.345 with zero home runs, 26 RBI, and 44 stolen bases, the second-most stolen bases in the American League that season.

==== 2026 ====
Across 151 games in 2026, Simpson batted .306/.333/.356 with zero home runs, 38 RBI, and an American League-leading 46 stolen bases. He had the second-highest batting average (.306) and the third-most hits (175) across the league. He became just the fifth player in Major League history to steal 40 bases in each of their first two seasons, and the first player to bat over .300 with zero home runs in a season since Luis Castillo in 1999.

On October 5, during Game 2 of the AL Division Series against the New York Yankees, Simpson hit the first postseason RBI of his career, a fielder's choice off of pitcher Cam Schlitter to score Junior Caminero in the bottom of the fifth inning. Simpson performed quite well during the 2026 World Series against the Milwuakee Brewers, as he batted .400/.400/.500 with two doubles, two stolen bases, and three RBI, though the Rays lost the series in five games. Across 13 games of the 2026 postseason, Simpson batted .311/.319/.422 with one triple, three doubles, five stolen bases, and seven RBI.

== International career ==
Simpson was named to the United States national baseball team for the 2024 WBSC Premier12. He batted .459 with 17 hits in 37 at-bats. Simpson was named to the All-World Team as an outfielder, and led the tournament in hits and stolen bases (7).
