= Brendan Cellucci =

American baseball player (born 1998)

Toronto Blue Jays – No. 70
- Pitcher
- Born: June 30, 1998 (age 28); Philadelphia, Pennsylvania, U.S.
- Bats: Left Throws: Left

MLB debut
- September 15, 2026, for the Toronto Blue Jays

MLB statistics (through 2026 season)
- Win-loss record: 0–0
- Earned run average: 0.00
- Strikeouts: 11
- Stats at Baseball Reference

Teams
- Toronto Blue Jays (2026–present)

Brendan Michael Cellucci (/sɛˈlutʃiː/ seh-LOO-chee; born June 30, 1998) is an American professional baseball pitcher for the Toronto Blue Jays of Major League Baseball (MLB).

== Amateur career ==
Cellucci attended William Penn Charter School in Philadelphia and Tulane University, where he played college baseball for the Tulane Green Wave. In 2018 and 2019, he played collegiate summer baseball with the Wareham Gatemen of the Cape Cod Baseball League. The Boston Red Sox selected him in the 12th round, with the 377th overall selection, of the 2019 MLB draft.

== Professional career ==
On July 23, 2023, while pitching for the Portland Sea Dogs, Cellucci, Wikelman González, and Luis Guerrero threw a combined no-hitter. The Red Sox released him in July 2025 and he spent the rest of the season pitching in independent league baseball.

The Toronto Blue Jays promoted him to the major leagues on August 19, 2026. Cellucci was optioned back to the Triple-A Buffalo Bisons on August 21 without appearing for the Blue Jays, thus making him a phantom ballplayer. Cellucci was recalled from Buffalo on September 14, and made his major league debut the next day, entering the game in the second inning in a 10–1 loss to the Detroit Tigers.
