= Wikelman González =

Venezuelan baseball player (born 2002)

Free agent
- Pitcher
- Born: March 25, 2002 (age 24); Maracay, Venezuela
- Bats: Right Throws: Right

MLB debut
- June 20, 2025, for the Chicago White Sox

MLB statistics (through 2025 season)
- Win–loss record: 1–0
- Earned run average: 2.66
- Strikeouts: 25
- Stats at Baseball Reference

Teams
- Chicago White Sox (2025)

Wikelman David González (born March 25, 2002) is a Venezuelan professional baseball pitcher who is a free agent. He has played in Major League Baseball (MLB) for the Chicago White Sox.

== Career ==
=== Boston Red Sox ===
González signed with the Boston Red Sox as an international free agent on July 2, 2018. He made his professional debut in 2019 with the Dominican Summer League Red Sox.

González did not play in a game in 2020 due to the cancellation of the minor league season because of the COVID-19 pandemic. He returned to action in 2021 to play for the rookie-level Florida Complex League Red Sox and Salem Red Sox. He spent the 2022 season with Salem and the Greenville Drive, then started the 2023 season with Greenville before his promotion to the Portland Sea Dogs. On July 23, González started a combined no-hitter, completed by Brendan Cellucci and Luis Guerrero. He was recognized as the Red Sox's minor league pitcher of the year for 2023.

On November 14, 2023, the Red Sox added González to their 40-man roster to protect him from the Rule 5 draft. He began the 2024 season with Double-A Portland, ranked as the Red Sox' number seven minor league prospect by Baseball America. In 24 appearances (19 starts) for Portland, González compiled a 4–3 record and 4.73 ERA with 92 strikeouts across 83 2/3 innings pitched.

=== Chicago White Sox ===
On December 11, 2024, González, Braden Montgomery, Chase Meidroth, and Kyle Teel were traded to the Chicago White Sox in exchange for Garrett Crochet. González was optioned to the Double-A Birmingham Barons to begin the 2025 season. In 16 appearances (four starts) split between Birmingham and the Triple-A Charlotte Knights, he logged a 5–2 record and 3.50 ERA with 39 strikeouts over 36 innings. On June 20, 2025, González was promoted to the major leagues for the first time. He recorded his first career win on September 4, tossing 1 1/3 innings against the Minnesota Twins. González made 16 appearances for Chicago during his rookie campaign, posting a 1–0 record and 2.66 ERA with 25 strikeouts across 20 1/3 innings pitched. On September 24, González was placed on the injured list due to a right elbow impingement, ending his season.

González was optioned to Triple-A Charlotte to begin the 2026 season. In 21 appearances for the Knights, he struggled to a 1–3 record and 6.57 ERA with 34 strikeouts and one save across 24 2/3 innings pitched. On August 8, 2026, González was designated for assignment by the White Sox.

=== Miami Marlins ===
On August 10, 2026, González was claimed off of waivers by the Miami Marlins. On October 30, he was sent outright to Triple-A and subsequently elected free agency.
