= Tristan Gray =

American baseball player (born 1996)

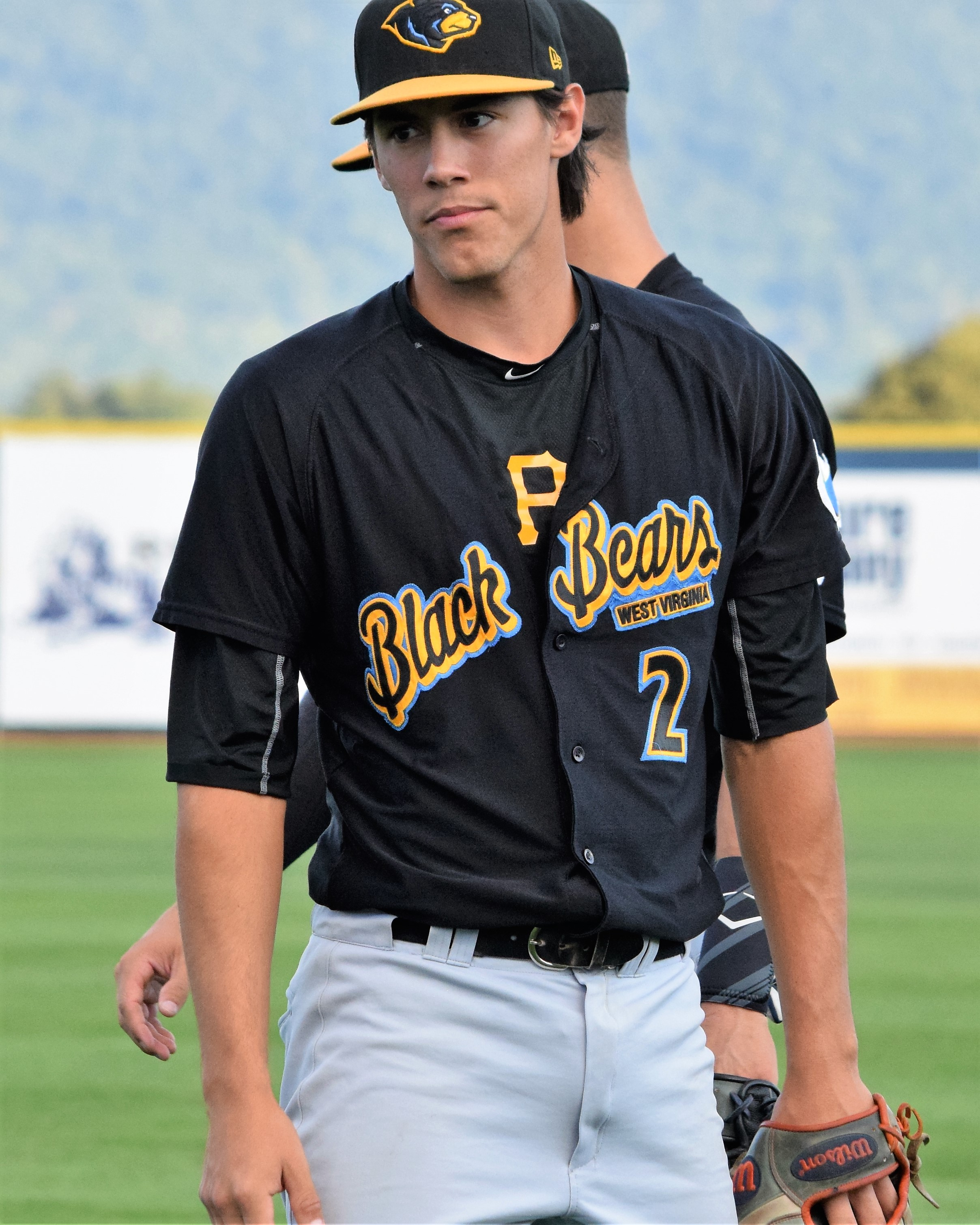
- Gray with the West Virginia Black Bears in 2017

Free agent
- Infielder
- Born: March 22, 1996 (age 30); Houston, Texas, U.S.
- Bats: Left Throws: Right

MLB debut
- September 16, 2023, for the Tampa Bay Rays

MLB statistics (through 2026 season)
- Batting average: .218
- Home runs: 8
- Runs batted in: 39
- Stats at Baseball Reference

Teams
- Tampa Bay Rays (2023); Miami Marlins (2024); Oakland Athletics (2024); Tampa Bay Rays (2025); Minnesota Twins (2026)

Tristan Colby Gray (born March 22, 1996) is an American professional baseball infielder who is a free agent. He has previously played in Major League Baseball (MLB) for the Tampa Bay Rays, Miami Marlins, Oakland Athletics, and Minnesota Twins.

== Amateur career ==
Gray graduated from Elkins High School in Missouri City, Texas in 2014. As a senior, he batted .456 with 12 doubles and 23 RBIs. He was selected by the New York Mets in the 37th round of the 2014 MLB draft, but did not sign and instead chose to enroll at Rice University where he played college baseball for the Rice Owls.

In 2015, as a freshman at Rice, Gray appeared in 56 games, batting .247 with three home runs and 25 RBIs. As a sophomore in 2016, he missed time at the beginning of the year due to injury, but returned to slash .295/.353/.462 with five home runs and 18 RBIs in 42 games. After the 2015 and 2016 seasons, he played collegiate summer baseball in the Cape Cod Baseball League for the Falmouth Commodores, and was named a league all-star in 2016. Gray broke out as a junior in 2017, hitting .313/.399/.540 with eight home runs and 39 RBIs in 47 games.

== Professional career ==
=== Pittsburgh Pirates ===
After his junior year, he was drafted by the Pittsburgh Pirates in the 13th round of the 2017 Major League Baseball draft. He signed and made his professional debut for the West Virginia Black Bears of the Low–A New York-Penn League, where he was named an All-Star. He finished the season batting .269 with seven home runs and 37 RBIs in 53 games.

=== Tampa Bay Rays ===
On February 22, 2018, the Pirates traded Gray, Daniel Hudson and cash to the Tampa Bay Rays in exchange for Corey Dickerson. He spent the 2018 season with the Charlotte Stone Crabs of the High–A Florida State League, compiling a .238 batting average, 13 home runs, and 69 RBI in 118 games. He spent 2019 with the Montgomery Biscuits of the Double–A Southern League, slashing .225/.332/.409 with 17 home runs and 64 RBI over 122 games.

Gray did not play in a game in 2020 due to the cancellation of the minor league season because of the COVID-19 pandemic. For the 2021 season, he was assigned to the Durham Bulls of the Triple-A East, slashing .246/.318/.428 with eight home runs and 33 RBI over 75 games. He returned to Durham for the 2022 season. Over 124 games, he batted .225 with 33 home runs and 89 RBI.

To open the 2023 season, he was assigned to Durham. In 127 games, Gray batted .234/.309/.482 with 28 home runs and a career–high 91 RBI. On September 16, 2023, Gray was selected to the 40-man roster and promoted to the major leagues for the first time after Taylor Walls was placed on the paternity list. In two games for the Rays, he went 2–for–5 (.400) with one home run and one RBI. Following the season on November 4, Gray was removed from the 40–man roster and sent outright to Triple–A Durham. He elected free agency on November 6.

=== Miami Marlins ===
On November 16, 2023, Gray signed a minor league contract with the Miami Marlins. In 34 games for the Triple–A Jacksonville Jumbo Shrimp, he batted .227/.301/.523 with 10 home runs and 23 RBI. On May 12, 2024, the Marlins selected Gray's contract, adding him to their major league roster. He went 0–for–7 in 7 games for Miami and was designated for assignment on August 26.

=== Oakland Athletics ===
On August 27, 2024, Gray was claimed off waivers by the Oakland Athletics. In eight games for Oakland, Gray went 3–for–21 (.143) with three walks.

=== Chicago White Sox ===
On October 31, 2024, Gray was claimed off waivers by the Pittsburgh Pirates. He was designated for assignment by Pittsburgh on January 20, 2025. Gray cleared waivers and was sent outright to the Triple-A Indianapolis Indians on January 27, but rejected the assignment and elected free agency.

On February 7, 2025, Gray signed a minor league contract with the Chicago White Sox. He had his contract selected to the 40-man roster, but was subsequently optioned to the Triple-A Charlotte Knights on July 5.

=== Tampa Bay Rays (second stint) ===
On July 26, 2025, Gray was traded to the Tampa Bay Rays in exchange for cash considerations. In 30 appearances for Tampa Bay, he batted .231/.282/.410 with three home runs and nine RBI.

=== Minnesota Twins ===
On November 18, 2025, Gray was traded to the Boston Red Sox in exchange for Luis Guerrero. The Red Sox then traded him to the Minnesota Twins on January 21, 2026, in exchange for minor league catcher Nate Baez. On April 3, Gray hit a grand slam off Yoendrys Gómez of the Tampa Bay Rays for his first homer as a Twin. On June 1, he hit another grand slam off of David Sandlin of the Chicago White Sox. Gray made 66 appearances for Minnesota, slashing .225/.267/.324 with four home runs and 29 RBI. On October 29, Gray was removed from the 40–man roster and sent outright to Triple–A St. Paul, but elected free agency rather than accept the assignment.
