= Luis Guerrero (baseball) =

Dominican baseball player (born 2000)

- Guerrero with the Leones del Escogido in 2026

Tampa Bay Rays
- Pitcher
- Born: August 5, 2000 (age 26); Baní, Dominican Republic
- Bats: Right Throws: Right

MLB debut
- September 8, 2024, for the Boston Red Sox

MLB statistics (through 2025 season)
- Win–loss record: 0–1
- Earned run average: 2.63
- Strikeouts: 19
- Stats at Baseball Reference

Teams
- Boston Red Sox (2024–2025)

Luis Sadiel Guerrero (born August 5, 2000) is a Dominican professional baseball pitcher in the Tampa Bay Rays organization. He was selected by the Boston Red Sox in the 17th round of the 2021 Major League Baseball (MLB) draft and made his debut for them in 2024.

== Career ==
=== Boston Red Sox ===
The Boston Red Sox selected Guerrero out of Chipola College in the 17th round, with the 496th overall selection, of the 2021 Major League Baseball draft. He made his professional debut in 2022, and split the season between the rookie–level Florida Complex League Red Sox, Single–A Salem Red Sox, and High–A Greenville Drive. In 27 total appearances, Guerrero accumulated a 4–5 record and 3.23 earned run average (ERA) with 59 strikeouts and nine saves in 39 innings of work.

In 2023, Guerrero was assigned to the Double–A Portland Sea Dogs to begin the year. On June 23, he completed a combined no-hitter alongside Wikelman González and Brendan Cellucci. Guerrero was selected to play in the All-Star Futures Game, replacing teammate Shane Drohan, who was sidelined with a calf ailment. In September, Guerrero was recognized as the Red Sox's minor league reliever of the year for 2023. On the season, he posted a 1.81 ERA with 59 strikeouts and 18 saves in 43 relief appearances for Double–A Portland prior to his promotion. In 6 appearances for the Triple–A Worcester Red Sox, he posted a 7.71 ERA with 9 strikeouts and one save in 4 2/3 innings of work.

Guerrero began the 2024 campaign with Worcester, compiling a 5–3 record and 3.31 ERA with 79 strikeouts over 54 1/3 innings pitched. On September 6, 2024, Guerrero was selected to the 40-man roster and promoted to the major leagues for the first time. In 9 appearances, Guerrero posted a 0.00 ERA with 9 strikeouts and 0.800 walks plus hits per innings pitched (WHIP).

Guerrero was optioned to Triple-A Worcester to begin the 2025 season. He made 13 appearances for Boston, logging an 0–1 record and 4.15 ERA with 10 strikeouts across 17 1/3 innings pitched. On June 28, 2025, Guerrero was placed on the injured list due to a right elbow sprain. He was transferred to the 60-day injured list on August 2. On November 6, Guerrero was designated for assignment by the Red Sox. He cleared waivers and was sent outright to Worcester on November 13.

=== Tampa Bay Rays ===
On November 18, 2025, Guerrero was traded to the Tampa Bay Rays in exchange for Tristan Gray. In 38 games (1 start) between Triple-A and Double-A he threw 47.2 innings going 1-7 with a 8.69 ERA with 50 strikeouts and 2 saves.

== Personal life ==
Around age 1, Guerrero underwent knee surgery and spent around 9 months in the hospital. Since then, he has had limited knee mobility because his muscles in that area did not grow like the others.
