= Kyle Teel =

American baseball player (born 2002)

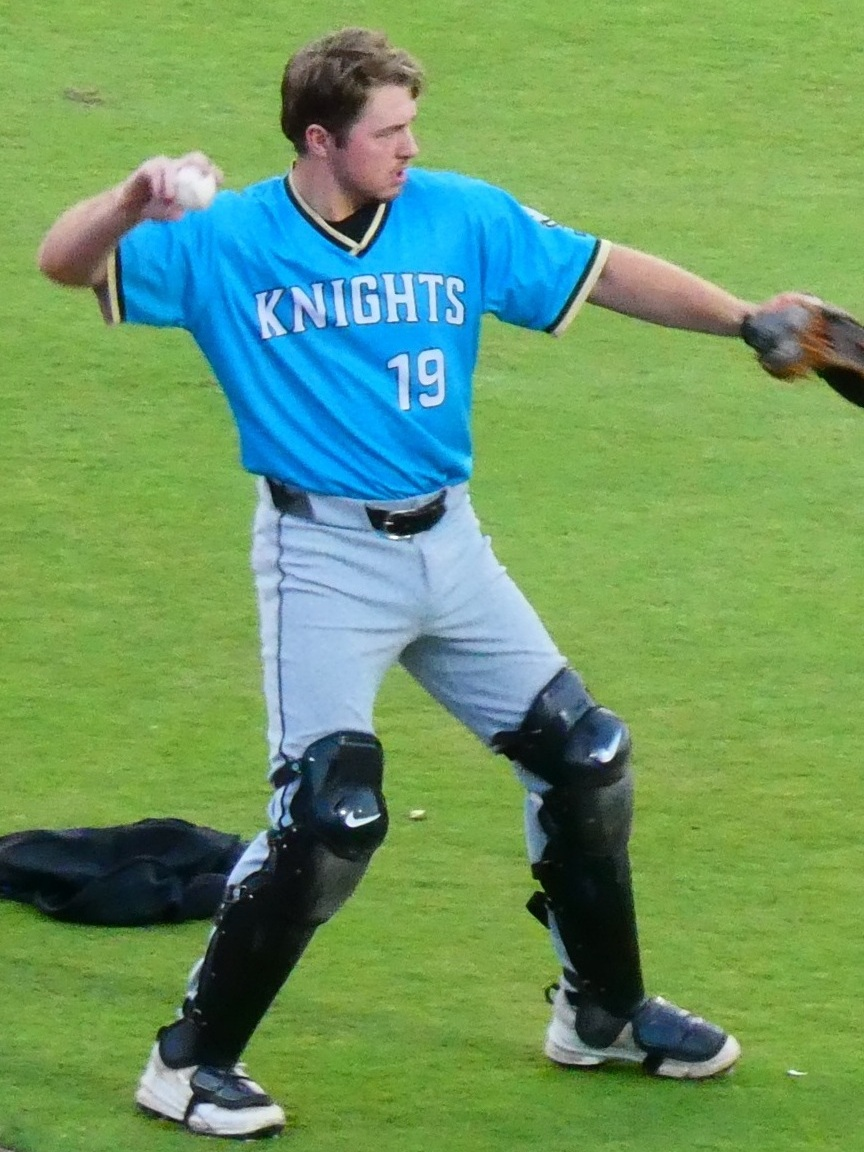
- Teel with the Charlotte Knights in 2025

Chicago White Sox – No. 8
- Catcher
- Born: February 15, 2002 (age 24); Ridgewood, New Jersey, U.S.
- Bats: Left Throws: Right

MLB debut
- June 6, 2025, for the Chicago White Sox

MLB statistics (through 2026 season)
- Batting average: .253
- Home runs: 13
- Runs batted in: 61
- Stats at Baseball Reference

Teams
- Chicago White Sox (2025–present)
Medals
Men's baseball
Representing the United States
Haarlem Baseball Week
Bronze medal – third place	2022	Team

Kyle Henry Teel (born February 15, 2002) is an American professional baseball catcher for the Chicago White Sox of Major League Baseball (MLB). He played college baseball for the Virginia Cavaliers, and was selected by the Boston Red Sox in the first round of the 2023 MLB draft. Teel was traded to the White Sox in 2024 and made his MLB debut in 2025. He is also a member of team Italy for the 2026 World Baseball Classic.

== Amateur career ==
Born in Ridgewood, New Jersey, Teel grew up in Mahwah, New Jersey, and attended Mahwah High School. On the baseball team he played shortstop primarily, as well as outfielder, pitcher, and catcher. He had a .574 batting average in 61 at bats with eight home runs and 31 RBIs as a junior. Teel was named the New Jersey Gatorade Player of the Year during his senior year. He also was the starting quarterback of Mahwah's football team.

Teel was considered a top high school catching prospect in the 2020 MLB draft, but opted out. After graduating high school, he played summer collegiate baseball for the Wisconsin Rapids Rafters of the Northwoods League, and posted a .258/.348/.392 slash line in 97 at bats.

Teel played as a designated hitter (19 games), right fielder (19 games), and catcher (15 games) as a freshman at the University of Virginia, and was named third-team All-Atlantic Coast Conference (ACC) at designated hitter after slashing .335/.416/.526 with 70 hits, nine home runs, and 41 RBIs in 209 at bats. He slashed .276/.402/.439 with 12 doubles, six home runs, and 45 RBIs in 221 at bats during his sophomore season, playing primarily catcher. After the season, Teel played collegiate summer baseball with the Harwich Mariners of the Cape Cod Baseball League, and was selected to play for the United States collegiate national team.

Teel entered his junior season as a projected first-round pick in the 2023 MLB draft. On May 22, 2023, Teel was named ACC Player of the Year in baseball. In late June, he was named the 2023 recipient of the Buster Posey Award, a national catcher of the year award. He was also a consensus selection to the 2023 College Baseball All-America Team.

== Professional career ==
=== Boston Red Sox ===
The Boston Red Sox selected Teel in the first round, with the 14th overall selection, of the 2023 Major League Baseball draft. On July 21, 2023, Teel signed with the Red Sox, reportedly for a $4 million signing bonus. He made his professional debut on August 3, in the Florida Complex League (FCL) with the FCL Red Sox. He was promoted to the High-A Greenville Drive on August 9.

Teel began the 2024 season with the Double-A Portland Sea Dogs, ranked as the Red Sox' number three minor-league prospect by Baseball America. In August, he was promoted to the Triple-A Worcester Red Sox, along with fellow-prospects Roman Anthony and Marcelo Mayer. At the time of his promotion, Teel had posted a .298/.390/.462 slash line with Portland.

=== Chicago White Sox ===
On December 11, 2024, Teel, along with Braden Montgomery, Chase Meidroth, and Wikelman González, was traded to the Chicago White Sox in exchange for Garrett Crochet. The next year, a viral video was posted of Teel hitting a home run off of Roki Sasaki during a practice game. In 50 appearances for the Triple-A Charlotte Knights, Teel batted .295/.394/.492 with eight home runs, 30 RBI, and seven stolen bases.

On June 6, 2025, Teel was selected to the 40-man roster and promoted to the major leagues for the first time. On July 23, he hit his first major league home run against the Tampa Bay Rays, measuring 336 feet to right field. Teel played in 78 games for the White Sox during his rookie campaign, slashing .273/.375/.411 with eight home runs, 35 RBI, and three stolen bases.

On March 11, 2026, Teel was ruled out for 4-to-6 weeks after suffering a Grade 2 right hamstring strain. On May 18, Teel was shut down after spraining the lateral collateral ligament in his right knee. He was transferred to the 60-day injured list the following day. Teel was activated on June 22. On July 21, he was placed back on the injured list due to a left ankle sprain suffered during a game against the Texas Rangers. Later that day, manager Will Venable announced that Teel would miss between 6-to-12 weeks due to the injury.

== International career ==
Teel played for Team Italy in the 2026 World Baseball Classic. Italian nationality law allows for citizenship through descent, making Teel eligible through his mother. Although Teel does not in fact have Italian citizenship, the possibility is enough to be eligible to play for Italy under World Baseball Classic rules.

During a game against Team USA, Teel injured his right hamstring after hitting a double and left the game. Before exiting, Teel had been 4–6 in pool play.

== Personal life ==
Teel is the son of Garett Teel and Janine LiButti. His father played minor league baseball in the Los Angeles Dodgers organization after the 1989 Major League Baseball draft. His mother played college softball for William Paterson University. His cousin Mike Teel was briefly third quarterback for the Seattle Seahawks. His younger brother Aidan played college baseball under Brian O'Connor at Virginia and Mississippi State. He was drafted in the 11th round (317th overall) by the Minnesota Twins in the 2026 Major League Baseball draft.
