= Braden Montgomery =

American baseball player (born 2003)

Chicago White Sox – No. 24
- Outfielder
- Born: April 16, 2003 (age 23); Des Moines, Iowa, U.S.
- Bats: Switch Throws: Right

MLB debut
- June 9, 2026, for the Chicago White Sox

MLB statistics (through 2026 season)
- Batting average: .226
- Home runs: 6
- Runs batted in: 38
- Stats at Baseball Reference

Teams
- Chicago White Sox (2026–present)

Braden Abraham Montgomery (born April 16, 2003) is an American professional baseball outfielder for the Chicago White Sox of Major League Baseball (MLB). Montgomery played college baseball as both a pitcher and an outfielder for the Stanford Cardinal and Texas A&M Aggies. He was selected by the Boston Red Sox in the first round of the 2024 MLB draft and made his MLB debut in 2026 with the White Sox.

== Amateur career ==
Montgomery grew up in Madison, Mississippi, and attended Madison Central High School. He was named the Mississippi Gatorade Player of the Year as a senior. Montgomery was considered the top high school prospect in the state.

Montgomery enrolled at Stanford University and played college baseball with the Stanford Cardinal in his freshman year as a starting outfielder. He also pitched for the team, primarily as a reliever. He was named the Pac-12 Conference freshman of the year at the end of the regular season after compiling a .294 batting average with 16 doubles, 18 home runs, 50 runs scored, and 57 runs batted in (RBI) and also posting a 5.79 earned run average (ERA) with 28 strikeouts over 18 2/3 innings pitched. He was also named a Freshman All-American by Collegiate Baseball. In 2022, he played for the United States collegiate national team. After the 2022 and 2023 seasons, Montgomery played collegiate summer baseball for the Yarmouth–Dennis Red Sox of the Cape Cod Baseball League. Montgomery was named to the preseason All-Pac-12 team entering his sophomore season.

Montgomery transferred to Texas A&M University to play for the Texas A&M Aggies for the 2024 season, his junior year. In 61 games, he batted .322 with 27 home runs and 85 RBI. He made only two pitching appearance for the Aggies, allowing four runs in two innings pitched.

== Professional career ==
The Boston Red Sox selected Montgomery as an outfielder with the 12th overall pick of the first round of the 2024 MLB draft; the team announced his signing on July 29, 2024.

On December 11, 2024, the Red Sox traded Montgomery, Kyle Teel, Chase Meidroth, and Wikelman González to the Chicago White Sox in exchange for Garrett Crochet. He made his professional debut in 2025 with the Single-A Kannapolis Cannon Ballers, hitting .304 with three home runs, 19 RBI, and six stolen bases in 18 games. Montgomery was selected to represent the White Sox organization at the 2025 All-Star Futures Game. A midseason promotion to the High-A Winston-Salem Dash saw him bat .260/.348/.445 with eight home runs, 38 RBI, and five stolen bases over 69 appearances. On July 29, 2025, Montgomery was promoted to the Double-A Birmingham Barons.

Montgomery was assigned to the Birmingham to begin the 2026 season, later receiving a promotion to the Triple-A Charlotte Knights; across 56 games for the two affiliates, he batted a cumulative .314/.422/.548 with 10 home runs, 41 RBI, and five stolen bases.

On June 9, 2026, Montgomery was selected to the 40-man roster and promoted to the major leagues for the first time. In his debut that night against the Atlanta Braves, he hit an RBI single and a walk-off home run. The latter was a two-run shot off Raisel Iglesias in the tenth inning. Montgomery became just the fifth player in MLB history to hit a walk-off homer in his MLB debut, joining Carlos Perez (2015), Miguel Cabrera (2003), Josh Bard, (2002) and Billy Parker (1971).
