= Petey Halpin =

American baseball player (born 2002)

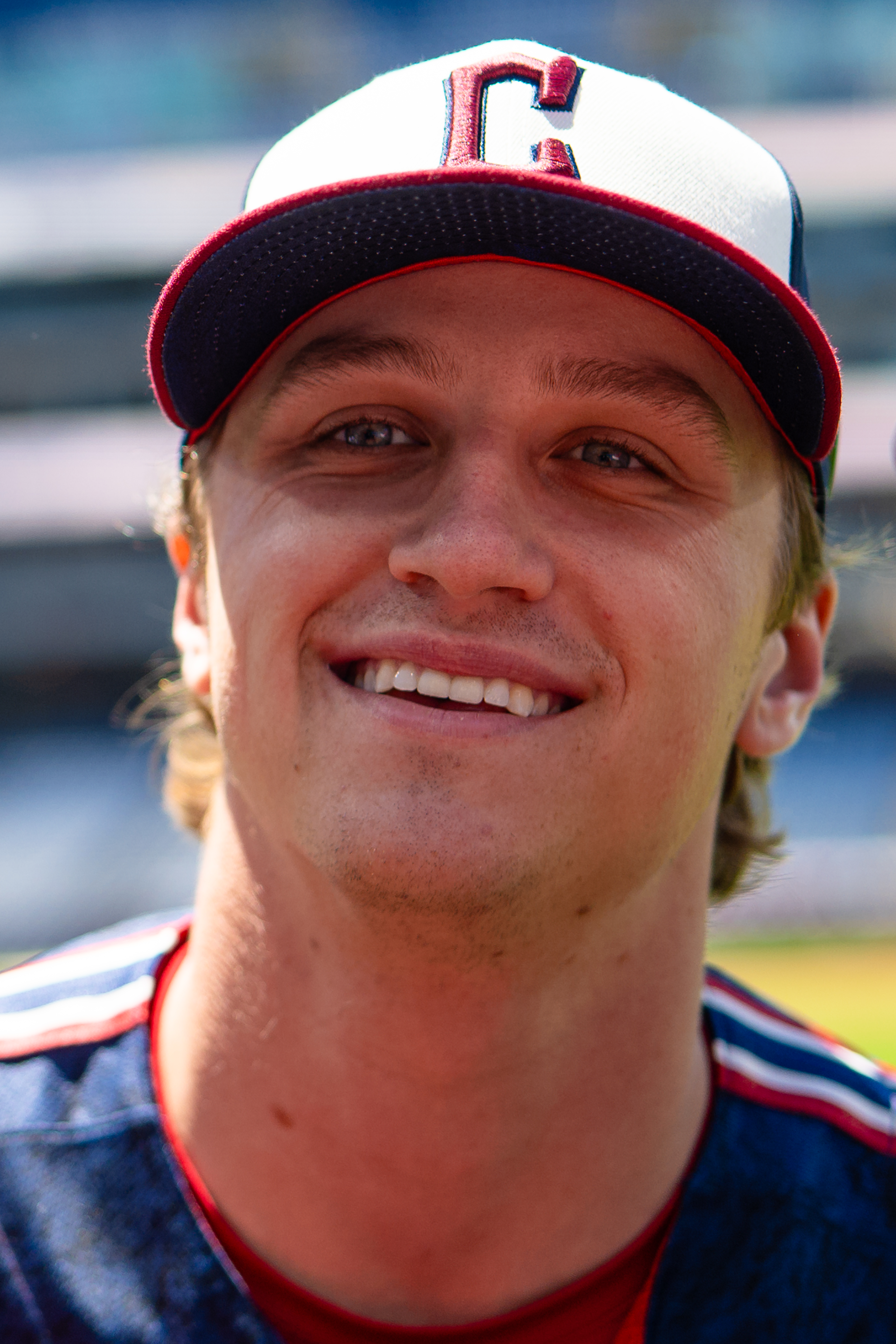
- Halpin with the Cleveland Guardians in 2026

Cleveland Guardians – No. 0
- Outfielder
- Born: May 26, 2002 (age 24); San Mateo, California, U.S.
- Bats: Left Throws: Right

MLB debut
- September 20, 2025, for the Cleveland Guardians

MLB statistics (through 2026 season)
- Batting average: .228
- Home runs: 4
- Runs batted in: 14
- Stats at Baseball Reference

Teams
- Cleveland Guardians (2025–present)

Peter Lyndon Halpin (born May 26, 2002) is an American professional baseball outfielder for the Cleveland Guardians of Major League Baseball (MLB). He debuted in MLB in 2025.

== Amateur career ==
Halpin attended Saint Francis High School in Mountain View, California for three years. He transferred to Mira Costa High School in Manhattan Beach, California, for his senior year. He signed to play college baseball for the Texas Longhorns.

== Professional career ==
The Cleveland Indians selected Halpin in the third round of the 2020 Major League Baseball draft. He signed with the team for $1.525 million.

Halpin did not play in a game in 2020 due to the cancellation of the minor league season because of the COVID-19 pandemic. Halpin made his professional debut in 2021 with the Single-A Lynchburg Hillcats, hitting .294/.363/.425 with one home run, 18 RBI, and 11 stolen bases.

Halpin spent the 2022 season with the High-A Lake County Captains, slashing .262/.346/.385 with six home runs, 36 RBI, and 16 stolen bases across 106 games. He started the 2023 campaign with the Double-A Akron RubberDucks, batting .243/.312/.372 with nine home runs, 38 RBI, and 12 stolen bases over 113 appearances.

Halpin spent the 2024 campaign with Double-A Akron, playing in 90 games and batting .233/.314/.399 with 12 home runs, 45 RBI, and 12 stolen bases. On November 19, 2024, the Guardians added Halpin to their 40-man roster to protect him from the Rule 5 draft.

Halpin was optioned to the Triple-A Columbus Clippers to begin the 2025 season, where he batted .249/.321/.414 with 14 home runs, 44 RBI, and 15 stolen bases across 126 appearances. On September 20, 2025, Halpin was promoted to the major leagues for the first time. He would make his debut the same day against the Minnesota Twins in the second game of the doubleheader. Starting in center field as a replacement for Nolan Jones, he recorded one hit in an 8–0 win. Halpin made six appearances for Cleveland in his rookie season, going 2-for-6 (.333) with two walks.

Halpin was optioned to Triple-A Columbus to begin the 2026 season.

In Game 3 of the 2026 American League Championship Series, Halpin hit the eventual game-winning two-run home run in a 3-2 victory over the Tampa Bay Rays as the Guardians took a 2-1 lead in the best-of-seven series.
