= Jonathan Aranda =

Mexican baseball player (born 1998)

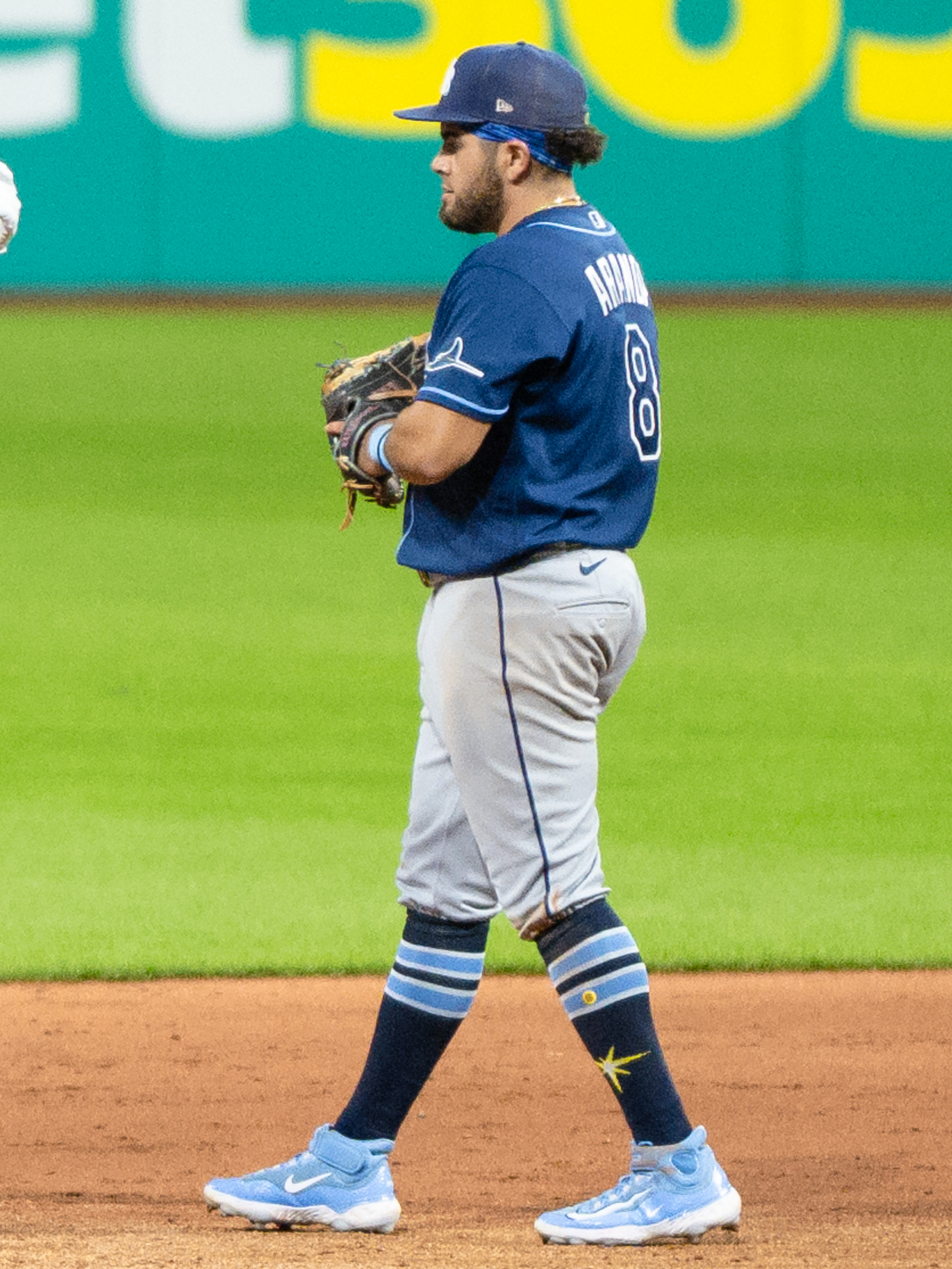
- Aranda with the Tampa Bay Rays in 2026

Tampa Bay Rays – No. 8
- Infielder
- Born: May 23, 1998 (age 28); Tijuana, Baja California, Mexico
- Bats: Left Throws: Right

MLB debut
- June 24, 2022, for the Tampa Bay Rays

MLB statistics (through 2026 season)
- Batting average: .274
- Home runs: 46
- Runs batted in: 184
- Stats at Baseball Reference

Teams
- Tampa Bay Rays (2022–present)

Career highlights and awards
- All-Star (2025)
Medals
Men's baseball
Representing Mexico
World Baseball Classic
Bronze medal – third place	2023 Miami	Team

Jonathan Alexander Aranda Ventura (born May 23, 1998) is a Mexican professional baseball infielder for the Tampa Bay Rays of Major League Baseball (MLB). He made his MLB debut in 2022. Aranda also represents the Mexico national team. In 2025, Aranda was named to his first All-Star game.

== Professional career ==
Aranda signed with the Tampa Bay Rays as an international free agent on July 2, 2015. Aranda spent his professional debut season of 2016 with the Dominican Summer League Rays, hitting .257/.345/.366/.711 with 1 home run and 17 RBI. He split the 2017 season between the GCL Rays and the Princeton Rays, hitting a combined .287/.345/.348 with 15 RBI and 14 stolen bases. He was named the Rays 2017 GCL MVP. Aranda split the 2018 season between Princeton and the Hudson Valley Renegades, combining to hit .269/.337/.391 with 1 home run and 29 RBI.

Aranda split the 2019 season between the GCL Rays, the Bowling Green Hot Rods, and the Charlotte Stone Crabs, hitting a combined .272/.359/.383 with 3 home runs and 35 RBI. He did not play in 2020 due to the cancellation of the Minor League Baseball season because of the COVID-19 pandemic. Aranda split the 2021 season between Bowling Green and the Montgomery Biscuits, hitting a combined .330/.418/.543 with 14 home runs and 65 RBI. He was named the 2021 Double-A South Most Valuable Player. He was selected to the 40-man roster following the season on November 19, 2021.

Aranda began the 2022 season with the Durham Bulls. In 63 games, he hit .310/.386/.512 with 11 home runs and 40 RBI. He was promoted to the majors on June 21, 2022. He made his major league debut against the Pittsburgh Pirates on June 24, 2022, going 1-for-2 with an RBI single in a 4-3 Rays victory. On September 13, Aranda hit his first career home run, a solo shot off of Toronto Blue Jays starter Alek Manoah. After the season, he was selected for the International League Most Valuable Player Award.

Aranda was optioned to Triple-A Durham to begin the 2023 season. In 34 games for the Rays, he batted .230/.340/.368 with two home runs and 13 RBI.

In 2024, Aranda was poised to make the Opening Day roster after a strong spring. However, on March 20, 2024, he suffered a broken right ring finger while fielding a ground ball, and underwent surgery that ruled him out for four–to–six weeks. He finished the 2024 season with a .234 batting average, .737 OPS, six home runs, and 14 RBI in 44 games.

Aranda emerged as the Rays starting first baseman to begin the 2025 season. He earned his first career All-Star selection, and had a productive year, with a .316 batting average, .883 OPS, 14 home runs and 59 RBI. He was limited to 106 games, missing two months in the second half of the season after fracturing his left wrist in a collision at first base with Giancarlo Stanton on July 31. He returned on September 26 and hit a home run in both of his first two games off the injured list.

== International career ==
Aranda was named to the Mexico national team for the 2023 World Baseball Classic. He played three games during the tournament and hit a single in six at bats.
