= Chase Meidroth =

American baseball player (born 2001)

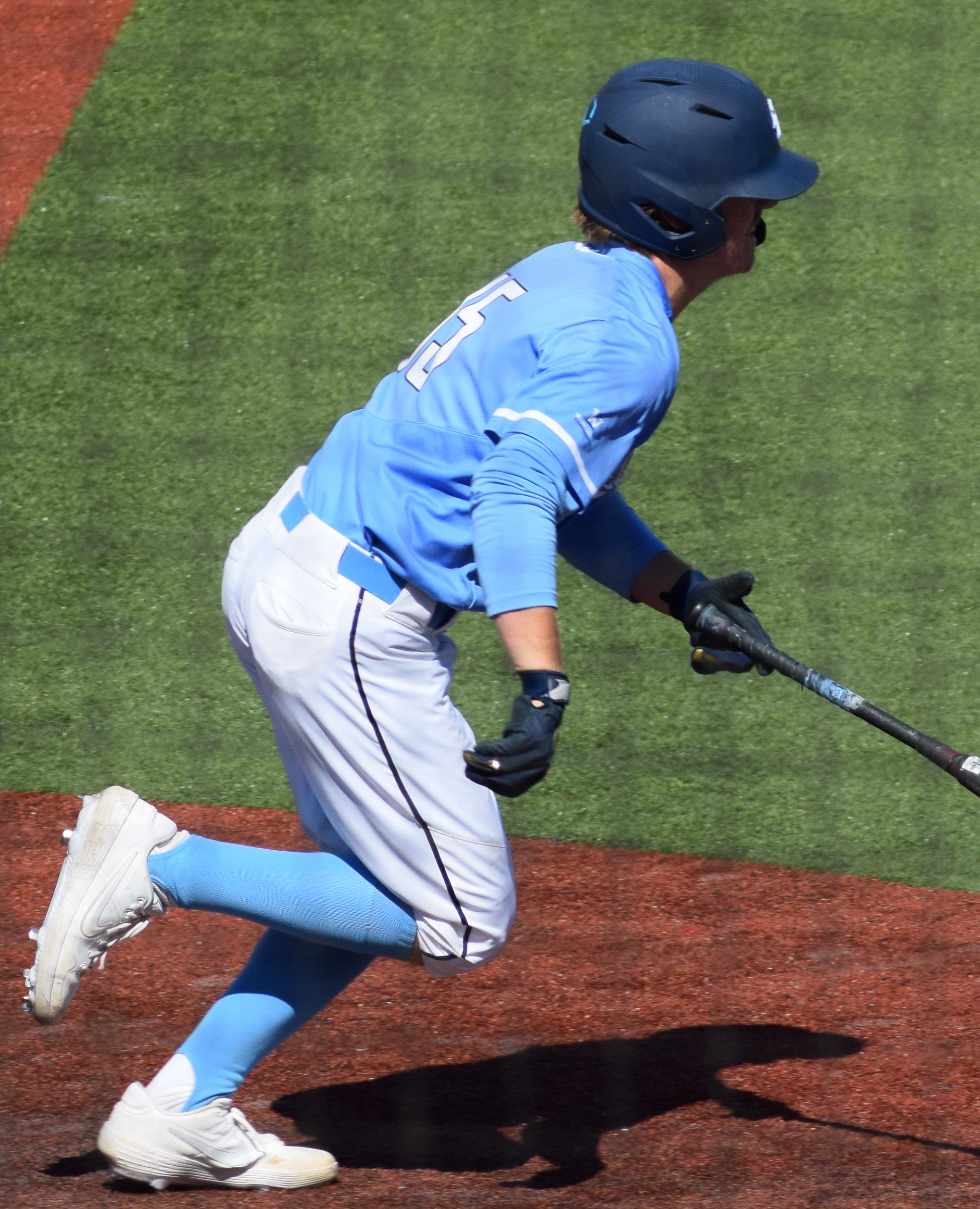
- Meidroth with the San Diego Toreros in 2020

Chicago White Sox – No. 10
- Infielder
- Born: July 23, 2001 (age 25); Torrance, California, U.S.
- Bats: Right Throws: Right

MLB debut
- April 11, 2025, for the Chicago White Sox

MLB statistics (through 2026 season)
- Batting average: .266
- Home runs: 21
- Runs batted in: 86
- Stats at Baseball Reference

Teams
- Chicago White Sox (2025–present)

Career highlights and awards
- Silver Slugger Award (2026)

Chase Gregory Meidroth (born July 23, 2001) is an American professional baseball infielder for the Chicago White Sox of Major League Baseball (MLB). He made his MLB debut in 2025.

== Career ==
=== Amateur ===
Meidroth attended Mira Costa High School in Manhattan Beach, California, and played college baseball for the San Diego Toreros. Meidroth had three separate stints of collegiate summer baseball. In 2019, he played with the Victoria HarbourCats of the West Coast League. In 2021, he played with the Kokomo Jackrabbits of the Northwoods League. In 2022, he played with the Yarmouth–Dennis Red Sox of the Cape Cod Baseball League.

=== Boston Red Sox ===
Meidroth was drafted by the Boston Red Sox in the fourth round, with the 129th overall selection, of the 2022 Major League Baseball draft.

Meidroth spent his first professional season with the rookie-level Florida Complex League Red Sox and the Single-A Salem Red Sox. During 2022 minor league play, he had a .316 batting average with four home runs and 15 RBI in 22 games. In 2023, Meidroth played in High-A for the Greenville Drive and in Double-A for the Portland Sea Dogs, posting a .271 average with nine home runs and 57 RBI in 111 total appearances.

Entering the 2024 season, Meidroth was ranked as the Red Sox' number 13 minor league prospect by Baseball America. He played in 122 games for the Triple–A Worcester Red Sox, slashing .293/.437/.401 with seven home runs, 57 RBI, and 13 stolen bases.

=== Chicago White Sox ===
On December 11, 2024, Meidroth, along with Braden Montgomery, Wikelman González, and Kyle Teel, was traded to the Chicago White Sox in exchange for Garrett Crochet. He began the 2025 season with the Triple-A Charlotte Knights, going 8-for-30 (.267) with three home runs, four RBI, and two stolen bases across nine games. On April 11, 2025, Meidroth was selected to the 40-man roster and promoted to the major leagues for the first time. On May 17, Meidroth hit his first career home run off of Matthew Boyd of the Chicago Cubs.

On May 27, 2026, Meidroth hit his first career grand slam off of Travis Adams of the Minnesota Twins.
