= Minnesota Twins =

Major League Baseball franchise in Minneapolis, Minnesota, U.S.

- 2026 Minnesota Twins season

Logo	Cap insignia
- Established in 1894; Based in Minnesota since 1961

Major league affiliations
- American League (1901–present); Central Division (1994–present); West Division (1969–1993)

Current uniform
- Retired numbers: 3; 6; 7; 10; 14; 28; 29; 34; 36; 42; W

Colors
- Red, navy blue, white

Name
- Minnesota Twins (1961–present); Washington Senators (1901–1904, 1956–1960); Washington Nationals (1905–1955); Kansas City Blues (1894–1900)

Nicknames
- Twinkies; Nats (1905–1955); Grifs (1912–1920); Minnesota Lumber Company (1977-78); Little Piranhas (2006); Bomba Squad (2019)

Ballpark
- Target Field (2010–present); Hubert H. Humphrey Metrodome (1982–2009); Metropolitan Stadium (1961–1981); Griffith Stadium (1911–1960) (Note: Known as National Park from 1911 to 1920.); National Park (1904–1910); American League Park (1901–1903); Exposition Park (1894–1900)

Major league titles
- World Series titles (3): 1924; 1987; 1991
- AL pennants (6): 1924; 1925; 1933; 1965; 1987; 1991
- AL West division titles (4): 1969; 1970; 1987; 1991
- AL Central division titles (9): 2002; 2003; 2004; 2006; 2009; 2010; 2019; 2020; 2023
- Wild card berths (1): 2017

Front office
- Principal owners: Pohlad family (Tom Pohlad, chairman)
- President: Tom Pohlad (CEO)
- General manager: Jeremy Zoll
- Manager: Derek Shelton
- Mascots: Twinkie (1980–1981); T.C. Bear (2000–present)
- Website: mlb.com/twins

The Minnesota Twins are an American professional baseball team based in Minneapolis. The Twins compete in Major League Baseball (MLB) as a member club of the American League (AL) Central Division. The team is named after the Twin Cities moniker for the two adjacent cities of Minneapolis and Saint Paul.

The franchise was founded in Kansas City in 1894 as the minor league Kansas City Blues. The team relocated to Washington, D.C. in 1901 to become the major league Washington Senators. The franchise moved to Minnesota and was renamed the Minnesota Twins for the start of the 1961 season. The Twins played in Metropolitan Stadium from 1961 to 1981 and in the Hubert H. Humphrey Metrodome from 1982 to 2009. The team has played at Target Field since 2010.

The franchise won the World Series in 1924 as the Senators, and in 1987 and 1991 as the Twins. From 1901 to 2025, the Senators/Twins franchise's overall regular-season win–loss–tie record is 9,329–10,047–109 (.482); as the Twins (through 2025), it is 5,106–5,183–8 (.496).

== History ==
=== Washington Nationals/Senators: 1901–1960 ===
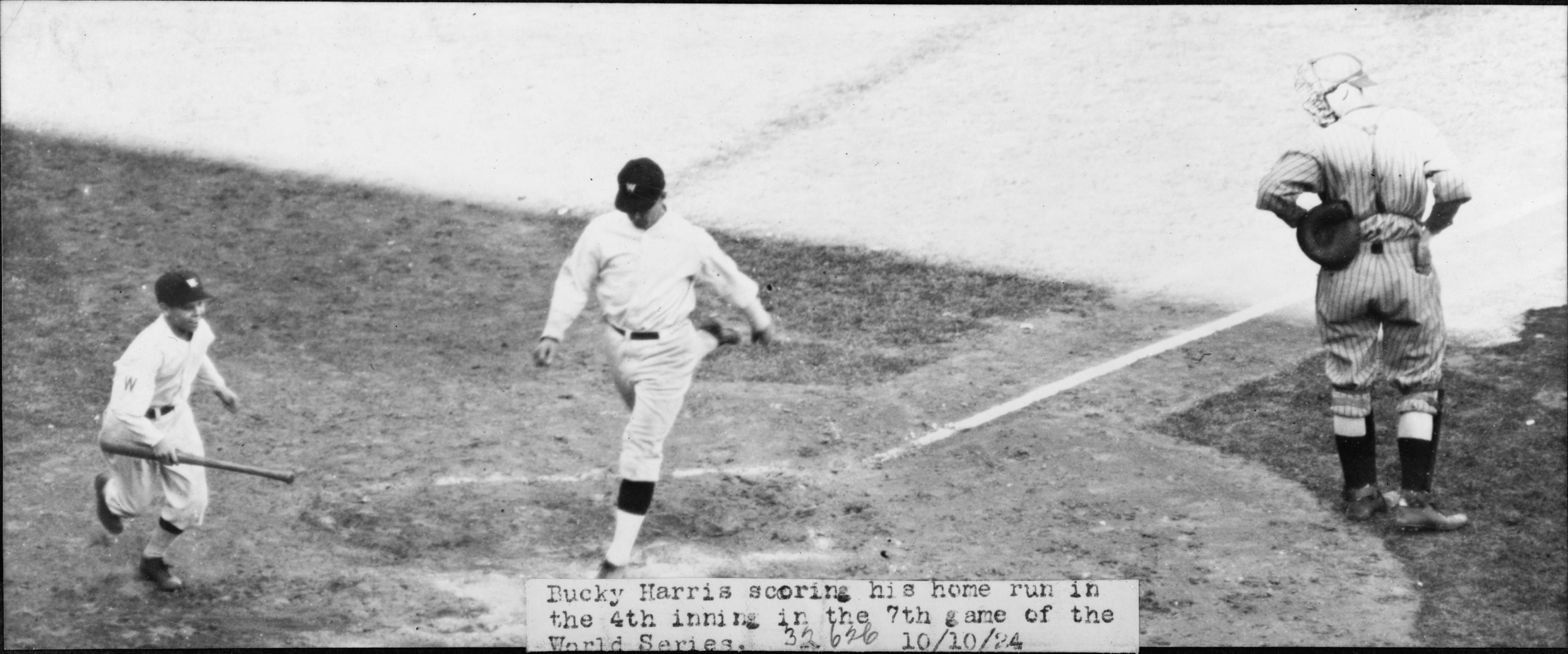
Washington's Bucky Harris scores on his home run in the fourth inning of Game 7 of the 1924 World Series.

The team was founded in Washington, D.C., in 1901 as one of the eight original teams of the American League. It was named the Washington Senators from 1901 to 1904, the Washington Nationals from 1905 to 1955, and the Senators again from 1956 to 1960. But the team was commonly referred to as the Senators throughout its history (and unofficially as the "Grifs" during Clark Griffith's tenure as manager from 1912 to 1920). The name "Nationals" appeared on uniforms for only two seasons, and then was replaced with the "W" logo. The media often shortened the nickname to "Nats" — even for the 1961 expansion team. The names "Nationals" and "Nats" were revived in 2005, when the Montreal Expos moved to Washington to become the Nationals.

The Washington Senators spent the first decade of their existence finishing near the bottom of the American League standings. The team's long bouts of mediocrity were immortalized in the 1955 Broadway musical Damn Yankees. Their fortunes began to improve with the arrival of 19-year-old pitcher, Walter Johnson, in 1907. Johnson blossomed in 1911 with 25 victories, although the team still finished the season in seventh place. In 1912, the Senators improved dramatically, as their pitching staff led the league in team earned run average and in strikeouts. Johnson won 33 games while teammate Bob Groom added another 24 wins to help the Senators finish the season in second place. Griffith joined the team in 1912 and became the team's owner in 1920. (The franchise remained under Griffith family ownership until 1984.) The Senators continued to perform respectably in 1913 with Johnson posting a career-high 35 victories, as the team once again finished in second place. The Senators then fell into another decline for the next decade.

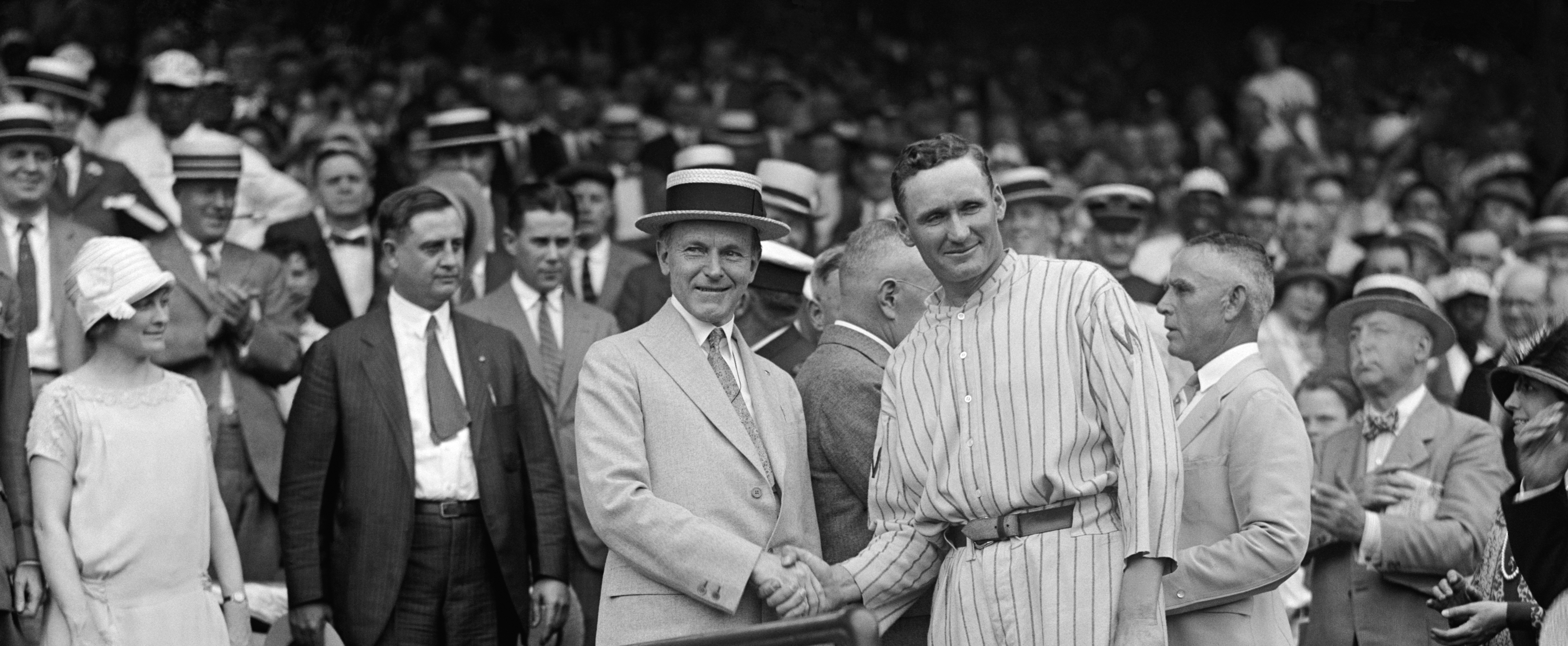
President Calvin Coolidge (left) and Washington Senators pitcher Walter Johnson (right) shake hands following the Senators' 1924 championship.

The team had a period of prolonged success in the 1920s and 1930s, led by Walter Johnson, as well as fellow Hall-of-Famers Bucky Harris, Goose Goslin, Sam Rice, Heinie Manush, and Joe Cronin. In particular, a rejuvenated Johnson rebounded in 1924 to win 23 games with the help of his catcher, Muddy Ruel, as the Senators won the American League pennant for the first time in its history. The Senators then faced John McGraw's heavily favored New York Giants in the 1924 World Series. The two teams traded wins back and forth with three games of the first six being decided by one run. In the deciding 7th game, the Senators were trailing the Giants 3–1 in the 8th inning when Bucky Harris hit a routine ground ball to third that hit a pebble and took a bad hop over Giants third baseman Freddie Lindstrom. Two runners scored on the play, tying the score at three. An aging Walter Johnson came in to pitch the ninth inning and held the Giants scoreless into extra innings. In the bottom of the twelfth inning, Ruel hit a high, foul ball directly over home plate. The Giants' catcher, Hank Gowdy, dropped his protective mask to field the ball but, failing to toss the mask aside, stumbled over it and dropped the ball, thus giving Ruel another chance to bat. On the next pitch, Ruel hit a double; he proceeded to score the winning run when Earl McNeely hit a ground ball that took another bad hop over Lindstrom's head. This would mark the only World Series triumph for the franchise during their 60-year tenure in Washington.

The following season they repeated as American League champions but ultimately lost the 1925 World Series to the Pittsburgh Pirates. After Walter Johnson retired in 1927, he was hired as manager of the Senators. After enduring a few losing seasons, the team returned to contention in 1930. In 1933, Senators owner Griffith returned to the formula that worked for him nine years earlier: 26-year-old shortstop Joe Cronin became player-manager. The Senators posted a 99–53 record and cruised to the pennant seven games ahead of the New York Yankees, but in the 1933 World Series the Giants exacted their revenge, winning in five games. Following the loss, the Senators sank all the way to seventh place in 1934 and attendance began to fall. Despite the return of Harris as manager from 1935 to 1942 and again from 1950 to 1954, Washington was mostly a losing ball club for the next 25 years contending for the pennant only during World War II. Washington came to be known as "first in war, first in peace, and last in the American League"; their hard luck drove the plot of the musical and film Damn Yankees. Cecil Travis, Buddy Myer (1935 A.L. batting champion), Roy Sievers, Mickey Vernon (batting champion in 1946 and 1953), and Eddie Yost were notable Senators players whose careers were spent in obscurity on losing teams. In 1954, the Senators signed future Hall of Fame member Harmon Killebrew. By 1959, he was the Senators' regular third baseman and led the league with 42 home runs, earning him a starting spot on the American League All-Star team.

After Griffith's death in 1955, his nephew and adopted son Calvin took over the team presidency. Calvin sold Griffith Stadium to the city of Washington and leased it back. This led to speculation that the team was planning to move, as the Boston Braves, St. Louis Browns, and Philadelphia Athletics had done in recent years. By 1957, after an early flirtation with San Francisco (where the New York Giants would move after the season), Griffith began courting Minneapolis–St. Paul, a prolonged process that resulted in his rejecting the Twin Cities' first offer before agreeing to move. Home attendance in Washington, D.C., steadily increased from 425,238 in 1955 to 475,288 in 1958, and then jumped to 615,372 in 1959. However, part of the Minnesota deal guaranteed a million fans a year for three years, plus the potential to double TV and radio money.

The American League opposed the move at first, but in 1960 a deal was reached. Major League Baseball agreed to let Griffith move his team to the Minneapolis-St. Paul region and allowed a new Senators team to be formed in Washington for the 1961 season.

Asked nearly two decades later why he moved the team, Griffith replied, "I'll tell you why we came to Minnesota, it was when I found out you only had 15,000 blacks here. Black people don't go to ball games, but they'll fill up a rassling ring and put up such a chant it'll scare you to death. It's unbelievable. We came here because you've got good, hard-working, white people here."

=== Minnesota Twins: 1961–present ===
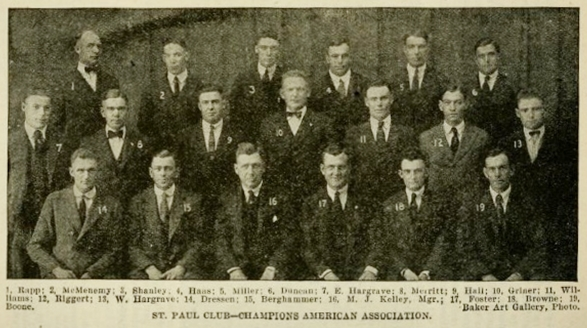
The Minneapolis Millers (1884–1960) and St. Paul Saints (1901–1960; team photo of 1920 pictured) of AAA played in Minnesota before the arrival of the Twins in 1961

Renamed the Minnesota Twins, the team set up shop in Metropolitan Stadium in Bloomington, a suburb of Minneapolis. Success came quickly to the team in Minnesota. Sluggers Harmon Killebrew and Bob Allison, who had been stars in Washington, were joined by Tony Oliva and Zoilo Versalles, and later second baseman Rod Carew and pitchers Jim Kaat and Jim Perry, winning the American League pennant in 1965. A second wave of success came in the late 1980s and early 1990s under manager Tom Kelly, led by Kent Hrbek, Bert Blyleven, Frank Viola, and Kirby Puckett, winning the franchise's second and third World Series (and first and second in Minnesota).

The name "Twins" was derived from "Twin Cities", a popular nickname for the two cities of Minneapolis and Saint Paul and sometimes used in reference to the entire Minneapolis–Saint Paul metropolitan region. The NBA's Minneapolis Lakers had moved to Los Angeles in 1960 due to poor attendance, blamed in part on a perceived reluctance of fans in Saint Paul to support the team. Griffith was determined not to alienate fans in either city by naming the team after one city or the other. He proposed to name the team the "Twin Cities Twins", but MLB objected and Griffith therefore named the team the Minnesota Twins. The team was allowed to keep its original "TC" (for Twin Cities) insignia for its caps. The team's logo shows two men, one in a Minneapolis Millers uniform and one in a St. Paul Saints uniform, shaking hands across the Mississippi River within an outline of the state of Minnesota. The "TC" remained on the Twins' caps until 1987, when they adopted new uniforms. By this time, the team felt it was established enough to put an "M" on its cap without having Saint Paul fans think it stood for Minneapolis. The "TC" logo was moved to a sleeve on the jerseys, occasionally appeared as an alternate cap design, and then was reinstated as the main cap logo in 2010. Both the "TC" and "Minnie & Paul" logos remain the team's primary insignia.

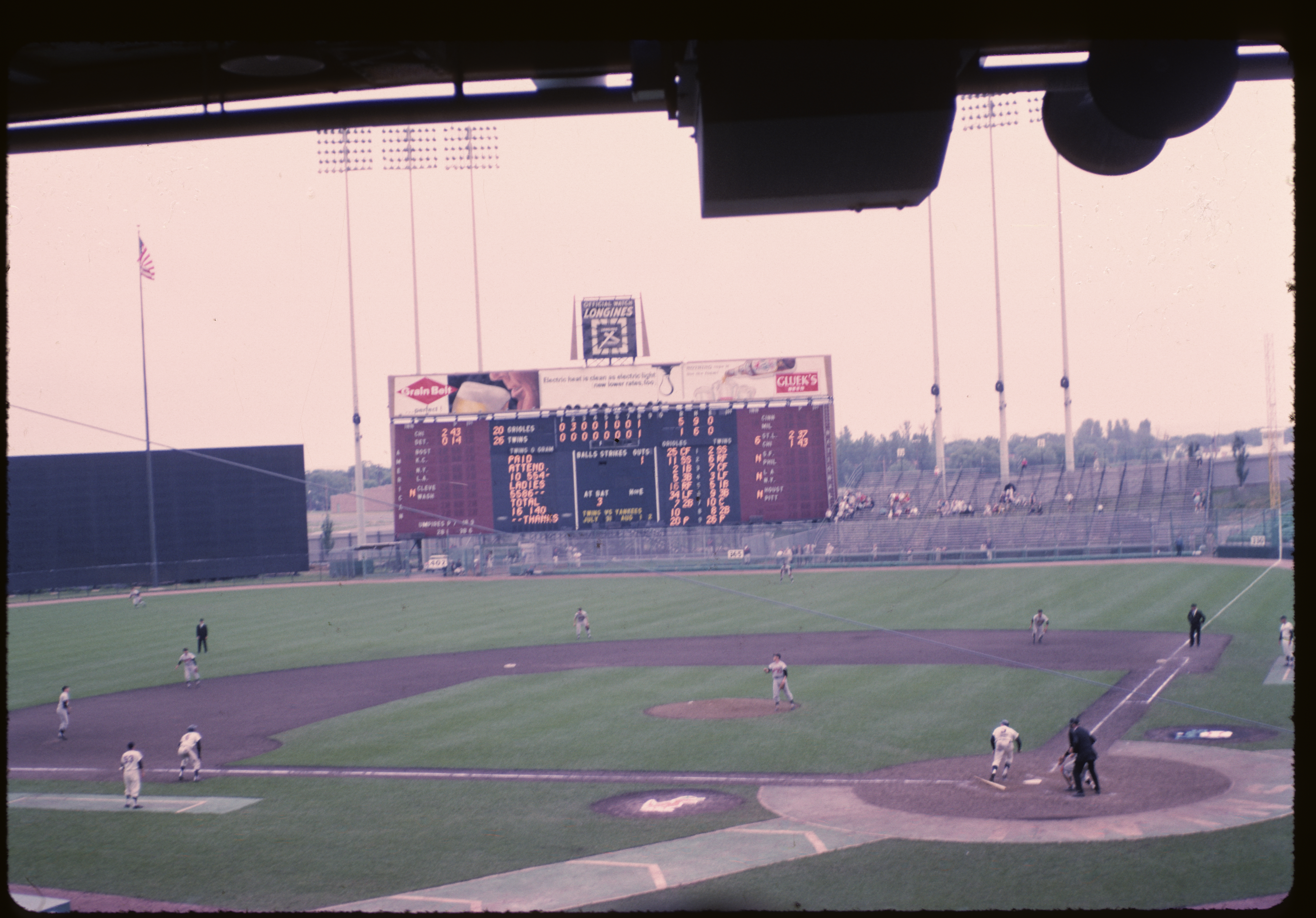
Metropolitan Stadium in Bloomington, Minnesota, 1964

==== 1960s ====
The Twins were eagerly greeted in Minnesota when they arrived in 1961. They brought a nucleus of talented players: Harmon Killebrew, Bob Allison, Camilo Pascual, Zoilo Versalles, Jim Kaat, Earl Battey, and Lenny Green. Tony Oliva, who would go on to win American League batting championships in 1964, 1965 and 1971, made his major league debut in 1962. That year, the Twins won 91 games, the most by the franchise since 1933. Behind Mudcat Grant's 21 victories, Versalles' A.L. MVP season and Oliva's batting title, the Twins won 102 games and the American League Pennant in 1965, but they were defeated in the World Series by the Los Angeles Dodgers in seven games (behind the Series MVP, Sandy Koufax, who compiled a 2–1 record, including winning the seventh game).

In 1962, the Minnesota State Commission on Discrimination filed a complaint against the Twins, which was the only MLB team still segregating players during spring training and when traveling in the southern United States.

Heading into the final weekend of the 1967 season, when Rod Carew was named the A.L. Rookie of the Year, the Twins, Boston Red Sox, Chicago White Sox, and Detroit Tigers all had a shot at clinching the American League championship. The Twins and the Red Sox started the weekend tied for 1st place and played against each other in Boston for the final two games of the season. The Red Sox won both games, seizing their first pennant since 1946 with a 92–70 record. The Twins and Tigers both finished one game back, with 91–71 records, while the White Sox finished three games back, at 89–73. In 1969, the new manager of the Twins, Billy Martin, pushed aggressive base running all-around, with Carew stealing home seven times in the season (1 short of Ty Cobb's Major League Record) in addition to winning the first of seven A.L. batting championships. With Killebrew slugging 49 homers and winning the AL MVP Award, these 1969 Twins won the first American League Western Division Championship, but they lost three straight games to the Baltimore Orioles, winners of 109 games, in the first American League Championship Series. The Orioles would go on to be upset by the New York Mets in the World Series. Martin was fired after the season, in part due to an August 1969 fight in Detroit with 20-game winner Dave Boswell and outfielder Bob Allison, in an alley outside the Lindell A.C. bar. Bill Rigney led the Twins to a repeat division title in 1970, behind the star pitching of Jim Perry (24–12), the A.L. Cy Young Award winner, while the Orioles again won the Eastern Division Championship behind the star pitching of Jim Palmer. Once again, the Orioles won the A.L. Championship Series in a three-game sweep, and this time they would win the World Series.

==== 1970s ====
After winning the division again in 1970, the team entered an eight-year dry spell, finishing around the .500 mark. Killebrew departed after 1974. Owner Calvin Griffith faced financial difficulty with the start of free agency, costing the Twins the services of Lyman Bostock and Larry Hisle, who left as free agents after the 1977 season, and Carew, who was traded after the 1978 season. In 1975, Carew won his fourth consecutive AL batting title, having already joined Ty Cobb as the only players to lead the major leagues in batting average for three consecutive seasons. In 1977, Carew batted .388, which was the highest in baseball since Boston's Ted Williams hit .406 in 1941; he won the 1977 AL MVP Award. He won another batting title in 1978, hitting .333.

==== 1980s–90s ====
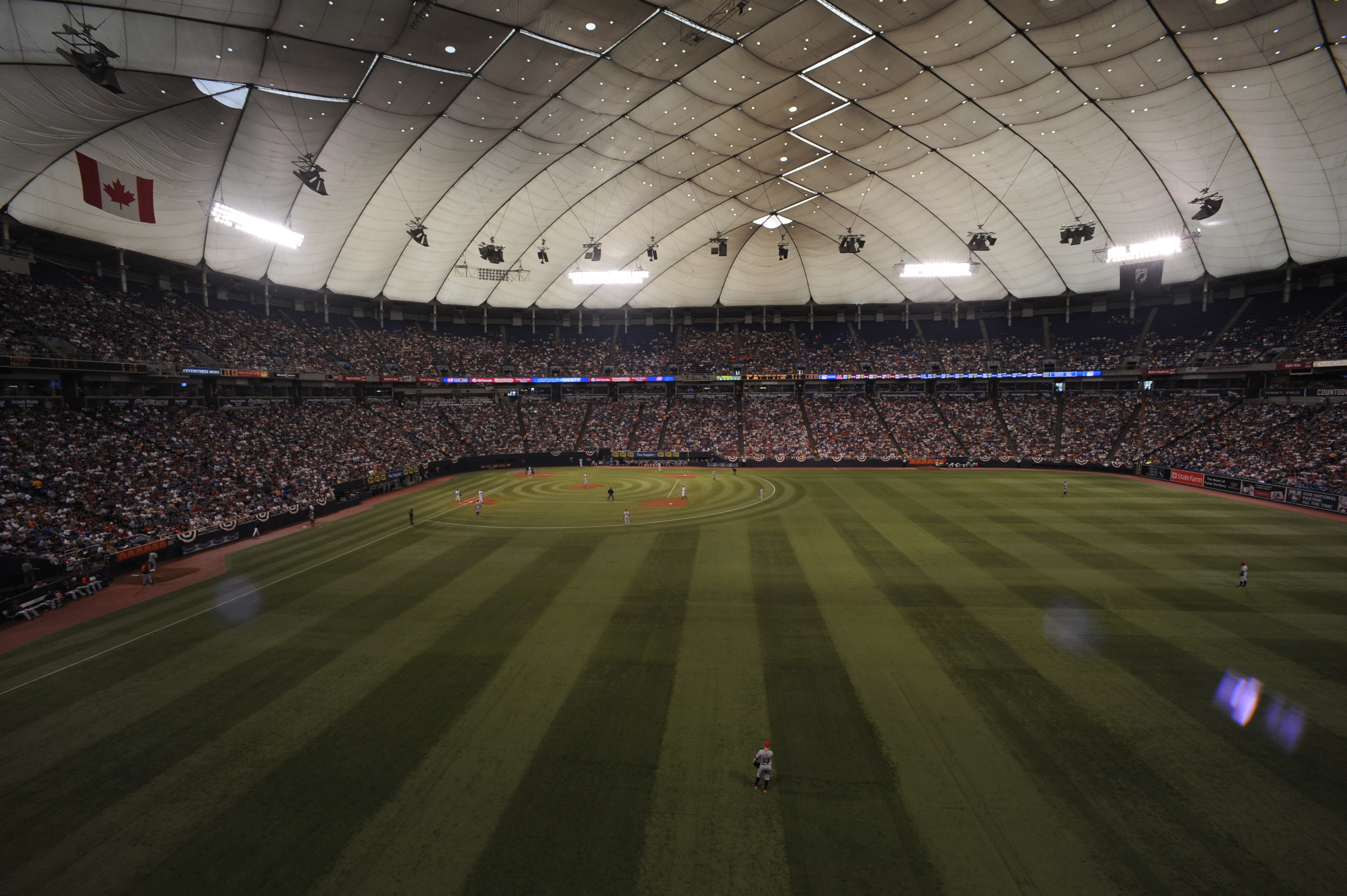
Interior of the Metrodome

In 1982, the Twins moved into the Hubert H. Humphrey Metrodome in downtown Minneapolis, which they shared with the Minnesota Vikings. After a 16–54 start, the Twins were on the verge on becoming the worst team in MLB history. They turned the season around somewhat, but still lost 102 games, finishing with what is currently the second-worst record in Twins history (beaten only by the 2016 team, which lost 103 games), despite the .301 average, 23 homers and 92 RBI from rookie Kent Hrbek. It was during the 1982 season that the Twins' nickname of "Twinkies" truly solidified, a nickname that would haunt them through their World Series years and sneak back into the conversation during the 1990s and 2010s slumps. In 1984, Griffith sold the Twins to multi-billionaire banker/financier Carl Pohlad. Pohlad beat a larger offer by New York businessman Donald Trump by promising to keep the club in Minnesota. The Metrodome hosted the 1985 Major League Baseball All-Star Game. After several losing seasons, the 1987 team, led by Hrbek, Gary Gaetti, Frank Viola (A.L. Cy Young winner in 1988), Bert Blyleven, Jeff Reardon, Tom Brunansky, Dan Gladden, and rising star Kirby Puckett, returned to the World Series after defeating the favored Detroit Tigers in the ALCS, 4 games to 1. Tom Kelly managed the Twins to World Series victories over the St. Louis Cardinals in 1987 and the Atlanta Braves in 1991. The 1988 Twins were the first team in American League history to draw more than 3 million fans. On July 17, 1990, the Twins became the only team in major league history to pull off two triple plays in the same game. Twins' pitcher and Minnesota native Jack Morris was the star of the series in 1991, going 2–0 in his three starts with a 1.17 ERA. 1991 also marked the first time that any team that finished in last place in their division would advance to the World Series the following season; both the Twins and the Braves did this in 1991. Contributors to the 1991 Twins' improvement from 74 wins to 95 included Chuck Knoblauch, the A.L. Rookie of the Year; Scott Erickson, 20-game winner; new closer Rick Aguilera and new designated hitter Chili Davis.

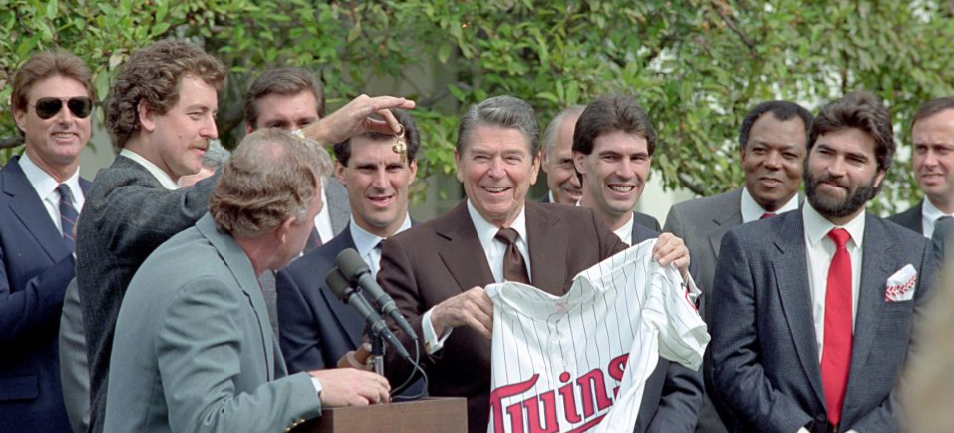
President Ronald Reagan congratulates the Twins winning the 1987 World Series

The World Series in 1991 is regarded by numerous media outlets as among the best to have been played. In this Series, four games were won during the teams' final at-bat, and three of these were in extra innings. The Atlanta Braves won all three of their games in Atlanta, and the Twins won all four of their games in Minnesota. Up until then, it was the second time in MLB history when a team won all its home games on their way to winning the World Series. The Twins also did it in 1987. The sixth game was a legendary one for Puckett, who tripled in a run, made a sensational leaping catch against the wall, and finally in the 11th inning hit the game-winning home run. Before Puckett's home run, the Braves brought in Charlie Leibrandt to face him. Chili Davis was on-deck. Puckett told Davis he was going to bunt, and Davis was going to win the game. Davis told him he was going to sit on Leibrandt's change-up and send everyone home. The seventh game went into extra innings with a score of 0–0, and it marked only the second time that the seventh game of the World Series had ever gone into extra innings. Morris pitched a total of ten shutout innings before the Twins subsequently won on a walk-off RBI single by Gene Larkin in the bottom of the 10th inning. The seventh game of the 1991 World Series is widely regarded as one of the greatest games in the history of professional baseball.

After a winning season in 1992 but falling short of Oakland in the division, the Twins fell into a years-long stretch of mediocrity, posting a losing record each season for the next eight: 71–91 in 1993, 50–63 in 1994, 56–88 in 1995, 78–84 in 1996, 68–94 in 1997, 70–92 in 1998, 63–97 in 1999 and 69–93 in 2000. From 1994 to 1997, a long sequence of retirements and injuries hurt the team badly, and Tom Kelly spent the remainder of his managerial career attempting to rebuild the Twins. In 1997, owner Carl Pohlad almost sold the Twins to North Carolina businessman Don Beaver, who would have moved the team to the Piedmont Triad area.

Puckett was forced to retire at age 35 due to loss of vision in one eye from a central retinal vein occlusion. The 1989 A.L. batting champion, he retired as the Twins' all-time leader in career hits, runs, doubles, and total bases. At the time of his retirement, his .318 career batting average was the highest by any right-handed American League batter since Joe DiMaggio. Puckett was the fourth baseball player during the 20th century to record 1,000 hits in his first five full calendar years in Major League Baseball, and was the second to record 2,000 hits during his first 10 full calendar years. He was elected to the Baseball Hall of Fame in 2001, his first year of eligibility.

==== 2000s ====
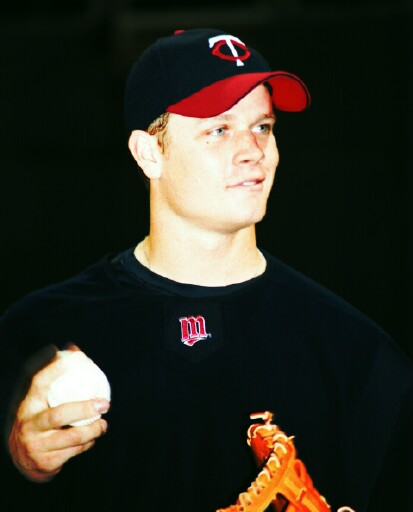
Justin Morneau was drafted in 1999 by the Twins in the third round of the draft. In ten years with the team from 2003 to 2013, he won the AL MVP in 2006 and two Silver Slugger Awards.

The Twins dominated the Central Division in the first decade of the new century, winning the division in six of those ten years ('02, '03, '04, '06, '09 and '10), and nearly winning it in '08 as well. From 2001 to 2006, the Twins compiled the longest streak of consecutive winning seasons since moving to Minnesota.

Threatened with closure by league contraction, the 2002 team battled back to reach the American League Championship Series before being eliminated 4–1 by that year's World Series champion Anaheim Angels.

In 2006, the Twins won the division on the last day of the regular season (the only day all season they held sole possession of first place) but lost to the Oakland Athletics in the ALDS. Ozzie Guillén coined a nickname for this squad, calling the Twins "little piranhas". The Twins players embraced the label, and in response, the Twins Front office started a "Piranha Night", with piranha finger puppets given out to the first 10,000 fans. Scoreboard operators sometimes played an animated sequence of piranhas munching under that caption in situations where the Twins were scoring runs playing "small ball", and the stadium vendors sold T-shirts and hats advertising "The Little Piranhas". The Twins also had the AL MVP in Justin Morneau, the AL batting champion in Joe Mauer, and the AL Cy Young Award winner in Johan Santana.

In 2008, the Twins finished the regular season tied with the White Sox on top of the AL Central, forcing a one-game playoff in Chicago to determine the division champion. The Twins lost that game and missed the playoffs. The game location was determined by rule of a coin flip that was conducted in mid-September. This rule was changed for the start of the 2009 season, making the site for any tiebreaker game to be determined by the winner of the regular season head-to-head record between the teams involved.

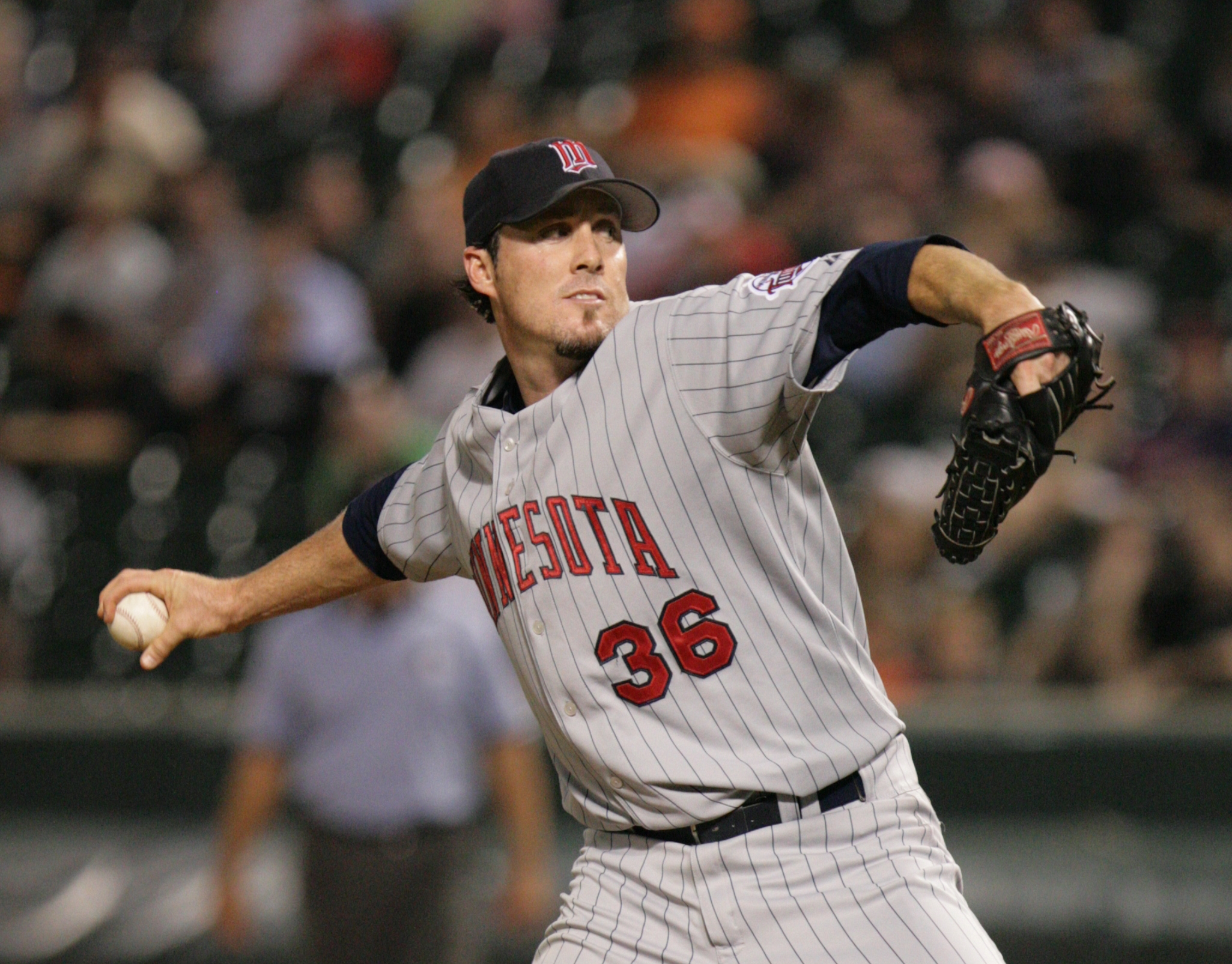
As a reliever, Joe Nathan saved 260 games for the team (a franchise record that still stands) and won the Rolaids Relief Man Award in 2009.

After a year where the Twins played .500 baseball for most of the season, the team won 17 of their last 21 games to tie the Detroit Tigers for the lead in the Central Division. The Twins were able to use the play-in game rule to their advantage when they won the AL Central at the end of the regular season by way of a 6–5 tiebreaker game that concluded with a 12th-inning walk-off hit by Alexi Casilla to right field, that scored Carlos Gómez. However, they failed to advance to the American League Championship Series as they lost the American League Divisional Series in three straight games to the eventual World Series champion New York Yankees. That year, Joe Mauer became only the second catcher in 33 years to win the AL MVP award. Iván Rodríguez won for the Texas Rangers in 1999, previous to that, the last catcher to win an AL MVP was the New York Yankees Thurman Munson in 1976.

2010 marked Minnesota's inaugural season played at Target Field, where the Twins finished the regular season with a record of 94–68, clinching the AL Central Division title for the 6th time in 9 years under manager Ron Gardenhire. New regular players included rookie Danny Valencia at third base, designated hitter Jim Thome, closer Matt Capps, infielder J. J. Hardy, and infielder Orlando Hudson. In relief pitching roles were late additions Brian Fuentes and Randy Flores. On July 7, the team suffered a major blow when Justin Morneau sustained a concussion, which kept him out of the lineup for the rest of the season. In the divisional series, the Twins lost to the Yankees in a three-game sweep for the second consecutive year. Following the season, Ron Gardenhire received AL Manager of the Year honors after finishing as a runner up in several prior years.

===== 2017–present =====
In 2017, the Twins went 85–77, finishing 2nd In the AL Central. Following Brian Dozier's 34 home runs, Miguel Sanó, Byron Buxton, and Eddie Rosario all had breakout years, while Joe Mauer hit .305. They ended up making the playoffs, which made them the first ever team to lose 100 games the previous year and make the playoffs the next season. They lost to the Yankees in the wild card round.

The 2018 season did not go as well. The Twins went 78–84, and did not return to the post-season. Sanó and Buxton were injured most of the year and eventually both sent down to the minors, while long-time Twin Brian Dozier was traded at the deadline. One bright spot came at the end of the season, when hometown hero Joe Mauer returned to catcher (his original position) for his final game, ending his career with a signature double and standing ovation. Another highlight was the team's two-game series against the Cleveland Indians in San Juan, Puerto Rico. After the season, manager Paul Molitor was fired. Free agent signing Logan Morrison and long-time veteran Ervin Santana declared free agency.

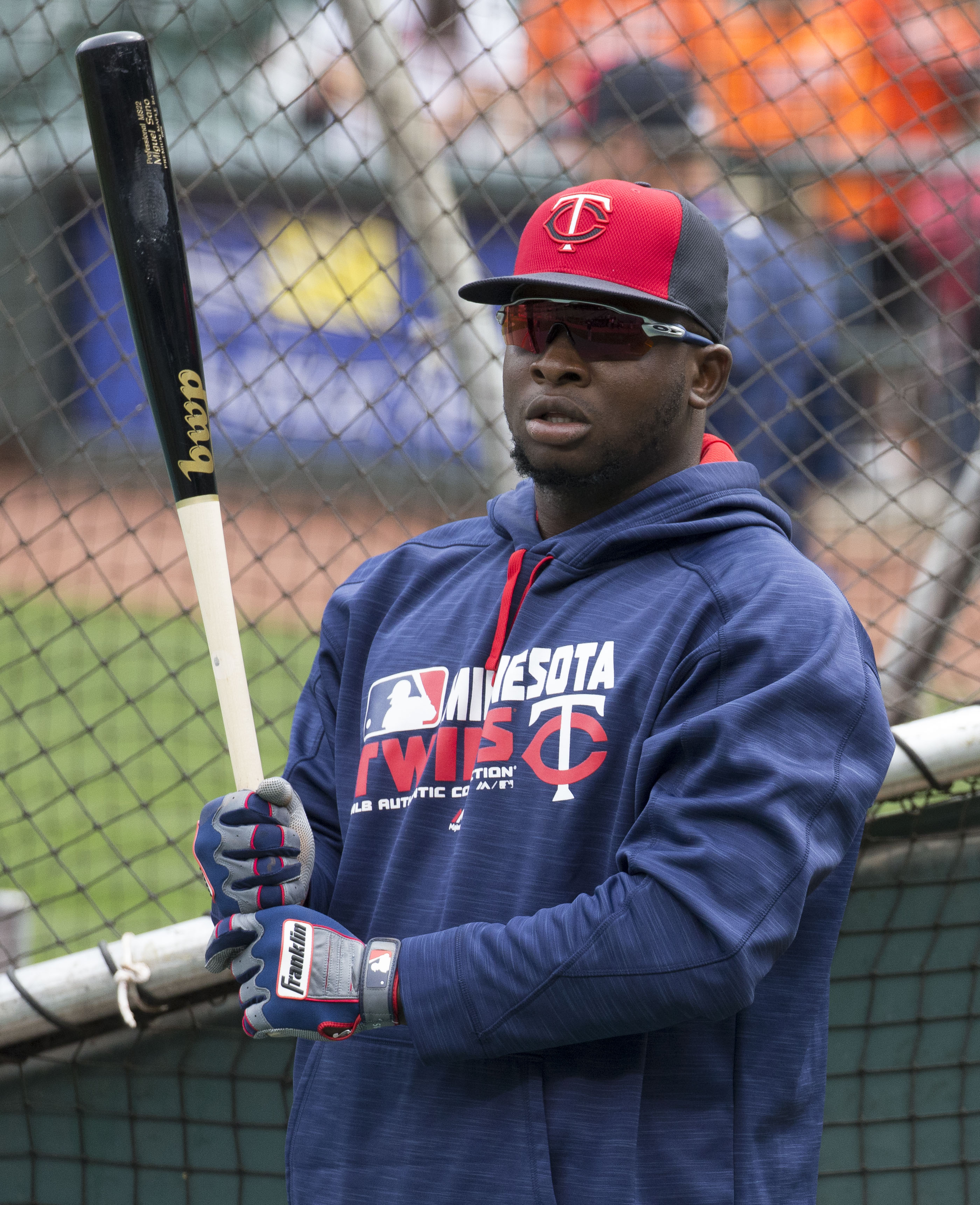
Miguel Sanó, infielder (2015–2022)

In 2019, the Twins clinched the AL Central Division for the first time since 2010, finishing the season with the second-most wins in franchise history with 101, one short of the 1965 season. The team combined for a total of 307 home runs, the most in MLB history for a single season. The team's slugging prowess has earned them the nickname the Bomba Squad. In the 2019 ALDS, the Twins opponents were the New York Yankees, who finished one home run behind at 306 and the second team to break the 300 home run mark. The Twins were swept again, and extend their postseason losing streak to 16, dating back to the 2004 ALDS. On September 17, 2019, Miguel Sanó hit a 482-foot home run to make the Twins the first team in major league history to have five players with at least 30 home runs in a season.

In 2023 the Minnesota Twins struggled through the first half, falling under .500 just before the All-Star break before beginning a late season surge that saw them take control of the AL Central. They finished as the third seed in the AL for the 2023 MLB Playoffs and faced the Toronto Blue Jays in the AL Wild Card round. Behind dominant pitching they won both of the first 2 games in the 3 game series, winning their first playoff game since 2004 (breaking an 0–18 postseason streak, the longest in North American sports history) and winning their first playoff series since the 2002 ALDS against the Oakland Athletics.

=== Threats to move or disband the team ===
The quirks of the Hubert H. Humphrey Metrodome, including the turf floor and the white roof, gave the Twins a home-field advantage that helped them win the World Series in 1987 and 1991, at least in the opinion of their opponents. The Twins went 12–1 in postseason home games during those two seasons, becoming the first and second teams to sweep all four home games in a World Series. (The feat was repeated by the Arizona Diamondbacks in 2001.) Nevertheless, the Twins argued that the Metrodome was obsolete. Furthermore, they said sharing a stadium with the NFL's Minnesota Vikings, as they had been doing since their 1961 move to Minnesota, limited the team's revenue and made it difficult to sustain a top-notch, competitive team. The team was rumored to contemplate moving to New Jersey, Las Vegas, Portland, Oregon, the Greensboro/Winston-Salem, North Carolina area, and elsewhere in search of a more financially competitive market. In 2002, the team was nearly disbanded when Major League Baseball selected the Twins and the Montreal Expos (now the Washington Nationals franchise) for elimination due to their financial weakness. The impetus for league contraction diminished after a court decision forced the Twins to play out their lease on the Metrodome. However, Twins owner Carl Pohlad continued his efforts to move, pursuing litigation against the Metropolitan Stadium Commission and obtaining a state court ruling that his team was not obligated to play in the Metrodome after the 2006 season. This cleared the way for the Twins to move or disband before the 2007 season if a new deal was not reached.

=== Target Field ===
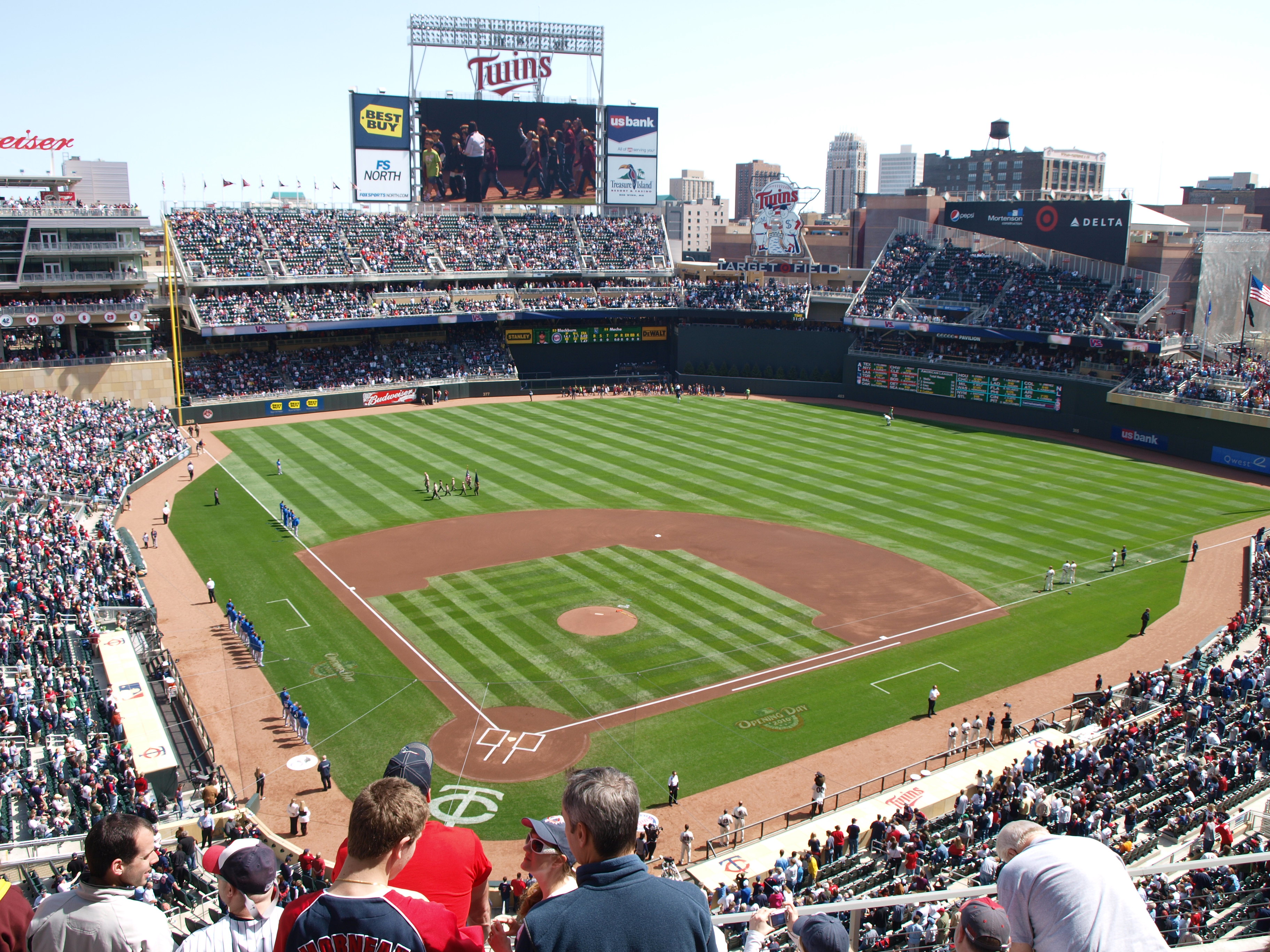
Target Field in 2010.

In response to the threatened loss of the Twins, the Minnesota private and public sector negotiated and approved a financing package for a replacement stadium— a baseball-only outdoor, natural turf ballpark in the Warehouse District of downtown Minneapolis— owned by a new entity known as the Minnesota Ballpark Authority. Target Field was constructed at a cost of $544.4 million (including site acquisition and infrastructure), utilizing the proceeds of a $392 million public bond offering based on a 0.15% sales tax in Hennepin County and private financing of $185 million provided by the Pohlad family. As part of the deal, the Twins also signed a 30-year lease of the new stadium, effectively guaranteeing the continuation of the team in Minnesota for a long time to come. Construction of the new field began in 2007, and was completed in December 2009, in time for the 2010 season. Commissioner Bud Selig, who earlier had threatened to disband the team, observed that without the new stadium the Twins could not have committed to sign their star player, catcher Joe Mauer, to an 8-year, $184 million contract extension. The first regular-season game in Target Field was played against the Boston Red Sox on April 12, 2010, with Mauer driving in two runs and going 3-for-5 to help the Twins defeat the Red Sox, 5–2.

On May 18, 2011, Target Field was named "The Best Place To Shop" by Street and Smith's SportsBusiness Journal at the magazine's 2011 Sports Business Awards Ceremony in New York City. It was also named "The Best Sports Stadium in North America" by ESPN The Magazine in a ranking that included over 120 different stadiums, ballparks and arenas from around North America. The stadium hosted the 85th Major League Baseball All-Star Game and the Home Run Derby in 2014. In mid 2020, following protests over the murder of George Floyd, a statue of former owner Calvin Griffith was removed from Target Plaza outside of the stadium due to his history of racist comments.

In August 2025, the Pohlad family—owners of the franchise since 1984—announced they would retain majority control of the Twins, opting not to sell the team. Instead, they plan to bring in two new limited partnership groups to help strengthen the organization’s financial base, pending approval from Major League Baseball.

== Uniforms ==
=== Current ===
Starting in 2023, the Twins made a drastic overhaul to their uniforms. The white home uniform features the updated "Twins" script (with the underline below "win") in red with navy numbers. On the back, the player names are in navy and numbers are in red. On the left sleeve, the Minnesota state map in navy was added with a red star to represent the Twin Cities of Minneapolis–St. Paul. The home cap is all-navy with the updated "TC" insignia. The home helmet is navy with a white panel and red brim and features the new "TC" insignia.

Road gray uniforms featured an all-caps "MINNESOTA" in navy with red numbers. On the back, the player names are in navy and numbers are in red. Likewise, the new navy Minnesota map with red star was featured on the left sleeve. Navy pinstripes were also added. The road cap is also all-navy, but with the white "M" and a red star on top representing the north star; this design also serves as the basis of their road batting helmet. Ahead of the 2026 season, the Minnesota map sleeve patch on their road uniform was replaced by a navy roundel containing the "MIN" abbreviation and two red stars symbolizing the Twin Cities of Minneapolis–St. Paul and surrounding the year 1961, their first season following the relocation from Washington, D.C.

The alternate navy uniforms, worn both at home and on the road, has the all-caps "MINNESOTA" in white with red numbers. On the back, player names are also rendered in white while numbers are in red. The left sleeve features the updated "TC" insignia. The uniforms are paired with the road all-navy "M" cap with red star, with the white-paneled "TC" helmet used on home games and the "M" all-navy helmet used on the road. In 2026, the uniform was tweaked, now mirroring the build of their home uniform.

The alternate home cream uniform featured a new "Twin Cities" wordmark (with the underline below "win Citie") in navy. The set, which lacked red, also featured two crossed navy flags representing both Minneapolis ("M") and St. Paul ("STP"). An alternate all-navy cap with the "TC" insignia is used, except the "TC" is in cream and also lacked red elements. This design also became the basis of the all-navy alternate home "TC" helmet.

Added in 2024 is a City Connect uniform, visually representing the state's nickname of "Land of 10,000 Lakes". The predominantly sublimated blue uniform with yellow accents featured the "MN" abbreviation on the left chest, with the yellow four-point star representing the north star. The sleeve patch contained a loon flying through ripples of water, with baseball stitching comprising the eyes and the north star representing its beak. Caps are blue with yellow brim, and contained the Minnesota state outline with a yellow star representing the Twin Cities and the northern lights reflected in a water line of a lake. The right side of the caps featured the "10,000 Lakes" moniker. The uniform was tweaked in 2025, replacing the royal blue pants with white pants that featured blue and yellow piping.

=== Past uniforms ===
From 1961 to 1971 the Twins sported uniforms bearing the classic "Twins" script and numerals in navy outlined in red. They wore navy caps with an interlocking "TC" on the front; this was adopted because Griffith was well aware of the bitter rivalry between Minneapolis and Saint Paul and didn't want to alienate fans in either city. The original "Minnie and Paul" alternate logo appears on the left sleeve of both the pinstriped white home uniform and gray road uniform.

For the 1972 season the Twins updated their uniforms. The color scheme on the "Twins" script and numerals were reversed, pinstripes were removed from the home uniform, and an updated "Minnie and Paul" roundel patch replaced the originals on the left sleeve.

In 1973, the Twins switched to polyester pullover uniforms, which included a powder blue road uniform. Chest numerals were added while a navy-brimmed red cap was used with the home uniform. The original "Minnie and Paul" logo returned to the left sleeve. Player names in red were added to the road uniform in 1977.

In 1987, the Twins updated their look. Home white uniforms brought back the pinstripes along with the modern-day "Twins" script. By this time, the franchise felt it was established enough in the area that it could put a stylized "M" on its cap without having fans in St. Paul think it stood for Minneapolis. The "TC" insignia adorned the left sleeve, later replaced by the modern "Minnie and Paul" alternate in 2002. Road gray uniforms, which also featured pinstripes, were emblazoned with "Minnesota" in red block letters outlined in navy, while the updated primary logo adorned the left sleeve. Both uniforms kept the red numerals trimmed in navy, but the color on the player names was changed to navy. In 1997, player names were added to the home uniform. Initially, both uniforms were paired with an all-navy cap featuring the underlined "M" in front, but in 2002, the "TC" cap was brought back as a home cap while the "M" cap was used on the road. The "M" cap was retired following the 2010 season, though the team continued to wear them as a throwback on special occasions.

For a few games during the 1997 season, the Twins wore red alternate uniforms, which featured navy piping and letters in white trimmed in navy. In that same year, the Twins also released a road navy alternate uniform, featuring red piping, "Minnesota" and player names in white block letters outlined in red, and red numerals outlined in white. The following season, the Twins replaced the red uniforms with a home navy alternate, which features the "Twins" script and back numerals in red outlined in white, and player names and chest numerals in white outlined in red. Both uniforms contained the "TC" (later modern "Minnie and Paul") and primary logo sleeve patches respectively. The Twins also brought back the navy-brimmed red cap for a few games with the home navy alternates. The road navy alternates remained in use until 2009, with the home navy version worn for the last time in the 2013 season.

The Twins also wore three other alternate uniforms in the past. In 2006, the Twins wore a sleeveless variation of their regular home uniforms with navy undershirts, which they wore until 2010. They also wore a buttoned version of their 1973–86 home uniforms in 2009, before giving way to the throwback off-white version of their 1961–71 home uniforms from 2010 to 2018.

In 2010, the Twins modified their road uniforms upon moving to Target Field. The pinstriped home uniforms remained, but the road primary now featured an updated "Minnesota" script (with an underline below "innesot") in red trimmed in navy. Letters are in navy while numerals (both on the chest and on the back) are in red trimmed in navy. The team's primary logo appears on the left sleeve. Meanwhile, the navy alternate road uniform shared the same look as the regular road uniforms, but with a few differences. The "Minnesota" script is in red outlined in white, letters and chest numerals are in white outlined in red, and back numerals are in red outlined in white. Red piping is also added. Both uniforms were paired with either the all-navy or the red-brimmed navy "TC" cap.

In 2015, the Twins changed their home uniform. It features the modern "Twins" script (with an underline below "win") in navy outlined in red with Kasota gold drop shadows. Letters and numerals also take on the same color as the "Twins" script. The modern "Minnie and Paul" alternate logo (with the state of Minnesota in navy outlined in Kasota gold) appears on the left sleeve. Caps are in all-navy with the interlocking "TC" outlined in Kasota gold. The following year, they unveiled a red alternate uniform, which features the "TC" insignia outlined in Kasota gold on the left chest. Letters and numerals are in navy outlined in white with Kasota gold drop shadows. The "Minnie and Paul" alternate logo appears on the left sleeve. The uniform is paired with a navy-brimmed red cap with the "TC" outlined in Kasota gold.

In 2019, a new home navy alternate was released, featuring the classic "Twins" script (with a tail underline accent after the letter "s") in red outlined in navy and Kasota gold. Letters and numerals also take on the same color as the "Twins" script. As with the home white uniforms, it is paired with the all-navy Kasota gold "TC" cap. The gold-trimmed "TC" insignia also appears on the left sleeve. The following year, a throwback-inspired powder blue uniform was unveiled. A modern buttoned version of the road uniform the team used from 1973 to 1986, the set contains the classic "Twins" script in red outlined in navy, along with red letters on the back and red numerals (both on the chest and on the back) outlined in navy. The "Minnie and Paul" alternate logo appears on the left sleeve. The uniform is paired with the primary all-navy "TC" cap minus the Kasota gold accents, which is also used on the helmets regardless of uniform.

Classic Twins uniforms

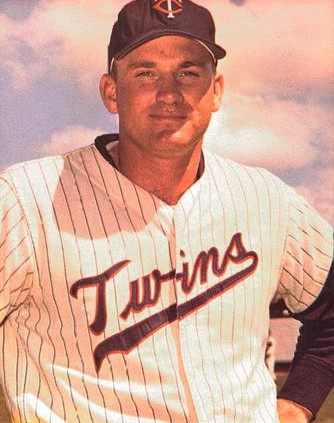
Harmon Killebrew wearing the Twins' 1961–1971 home uniform.

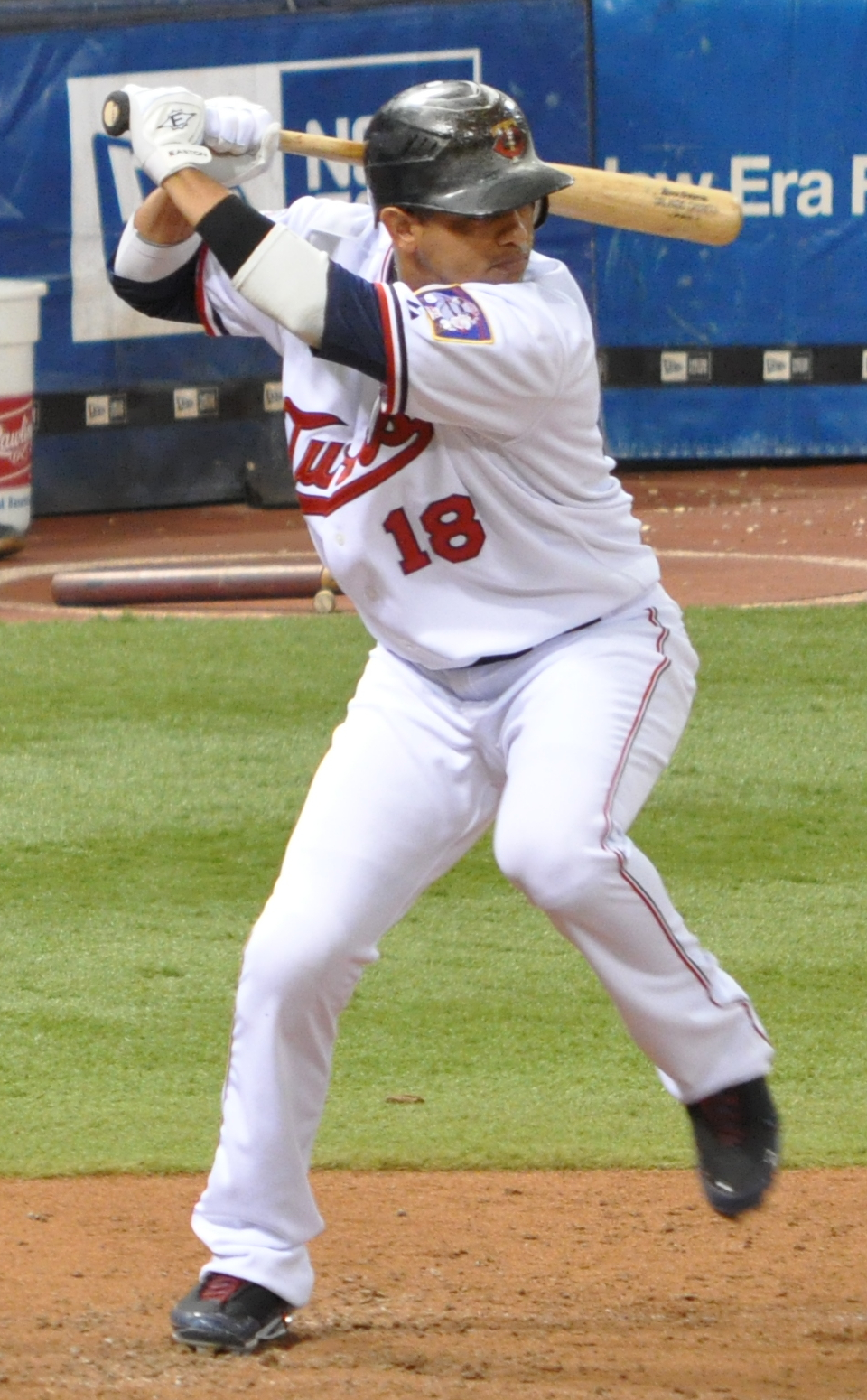
Orlando Cabrera wearing a throwback version of the Twins' 1972 home uniform.

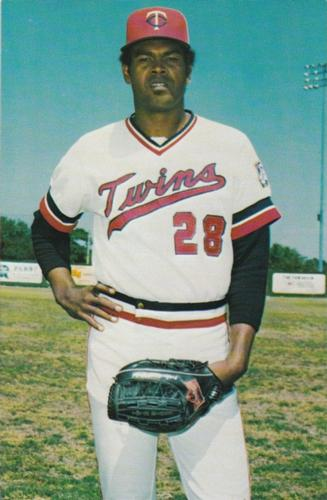
Albert Williams wearing the Twins' 1973–1986 home uniform.

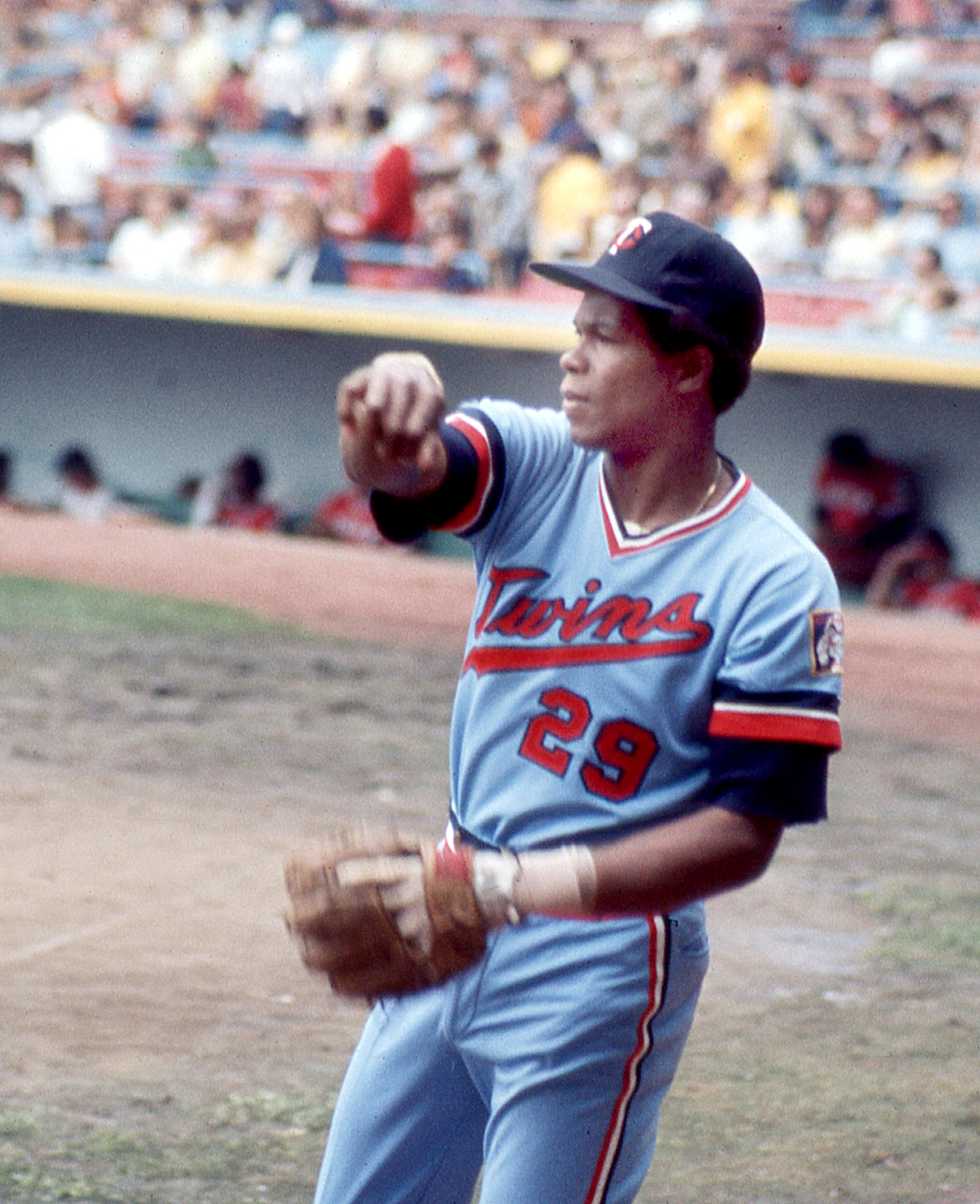
Rod Carew wearing the Twins' 1973–1986 powder blue road uniform.

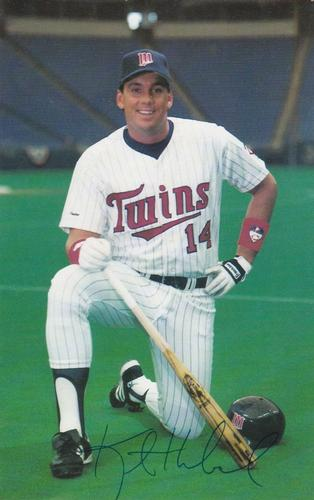
Kent Hrbek wearing the Twins' 1987–2015 home uniform with the navy "M" cap.

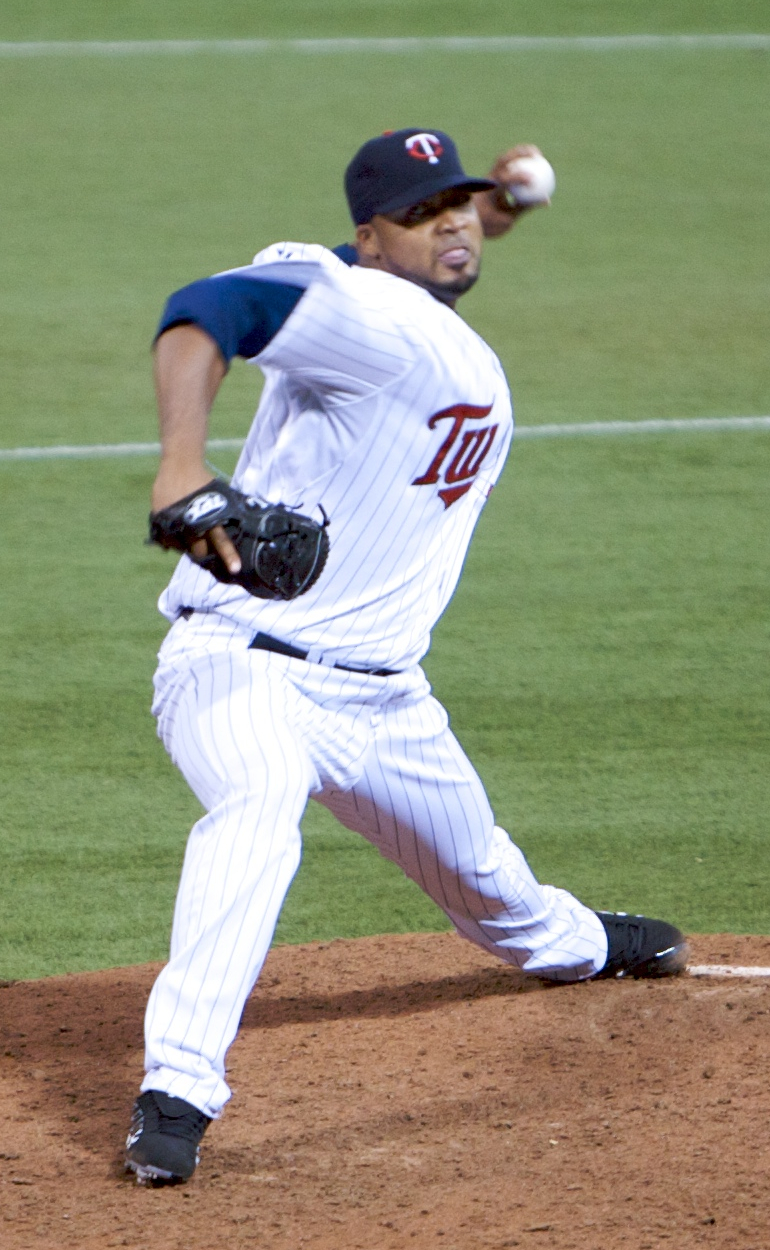
Francisco Liriano wearing the Twins' 1987–2015 home uniform with the navy "TC" cap.

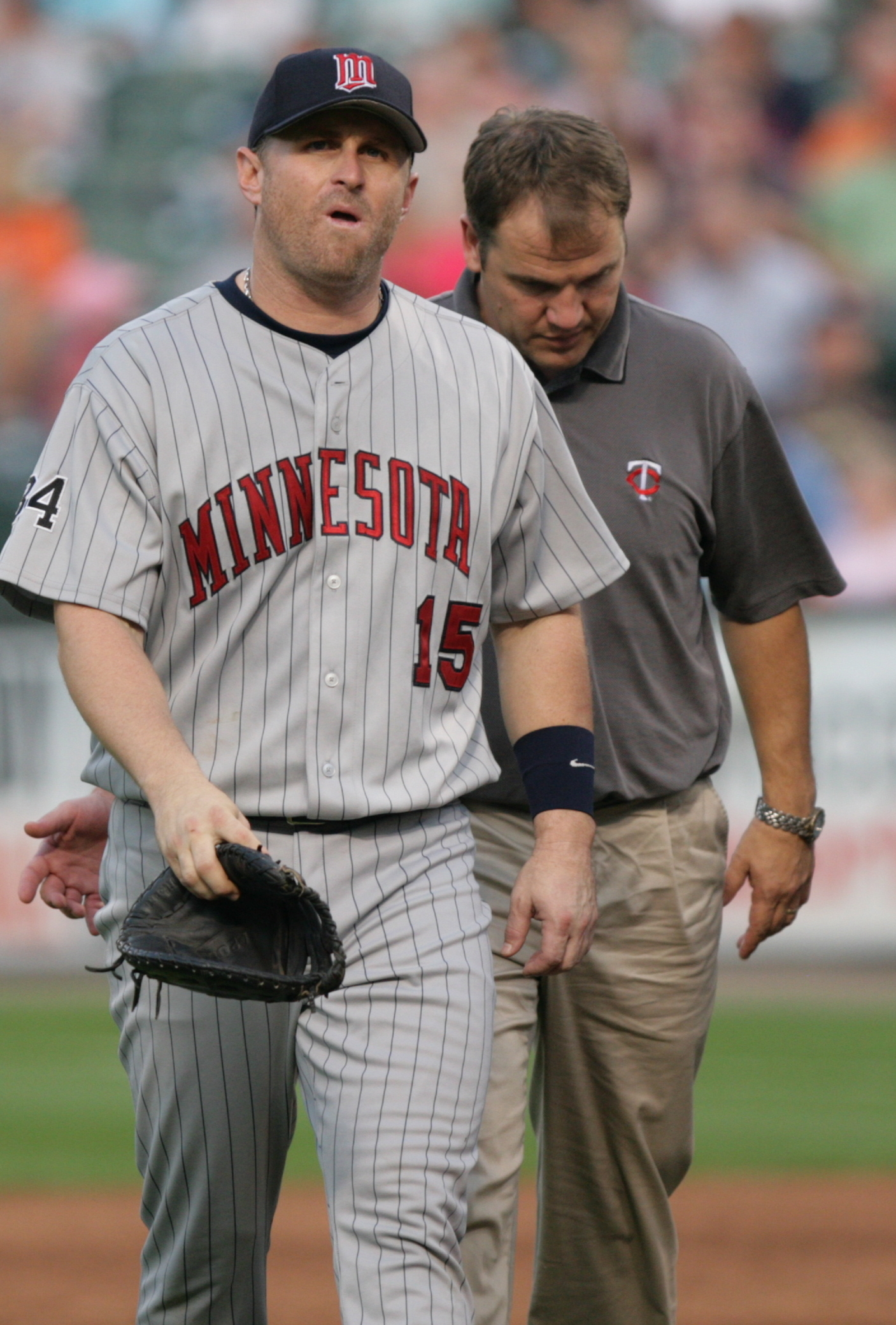
Phil Nevin wearing the Twins' 1987–2009 road uniform with the navy "M" cap.

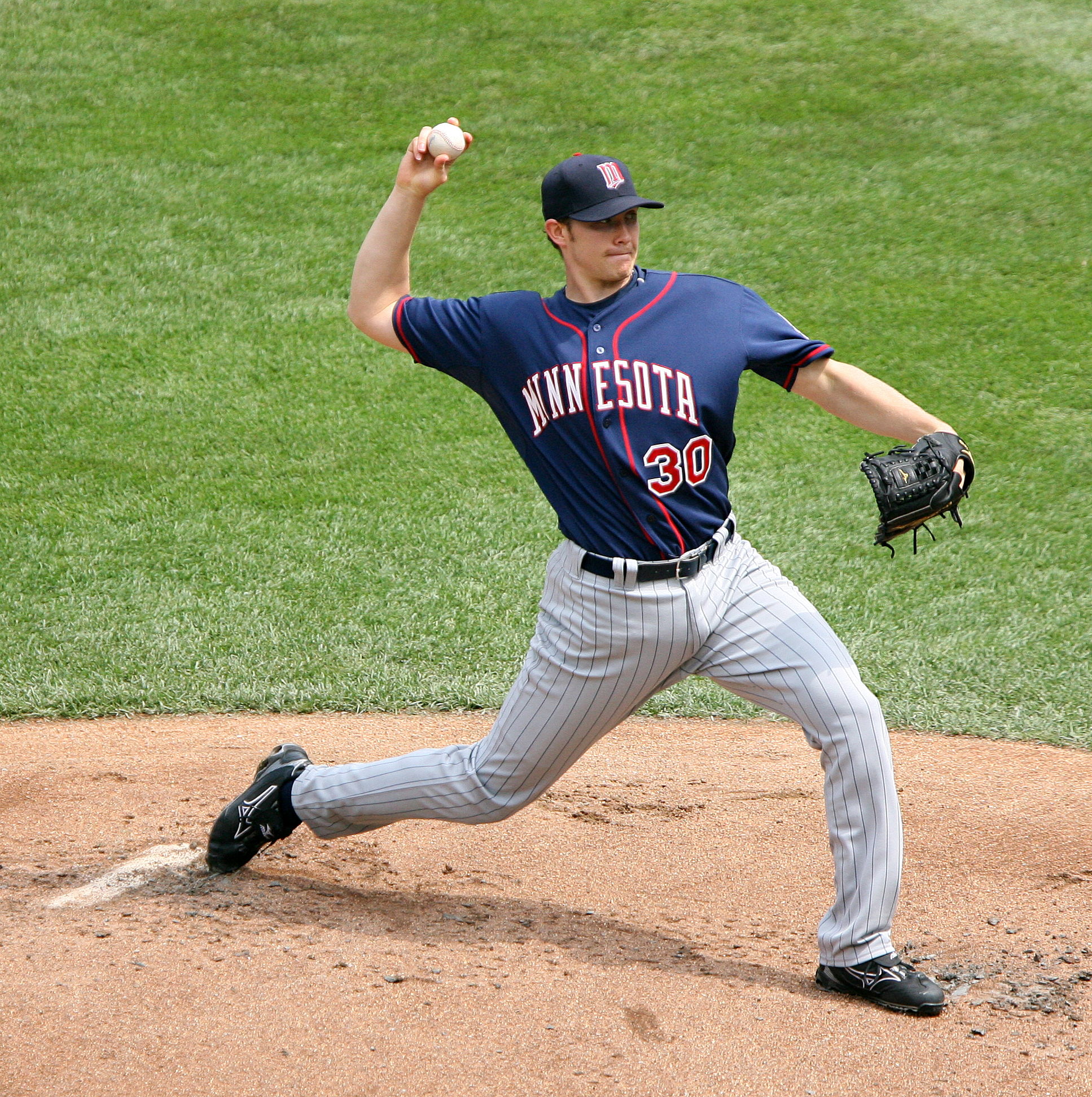
Scott Baker wearing the Twins' 1997–2009 road navy alternate uniform with the navy "M" cap.

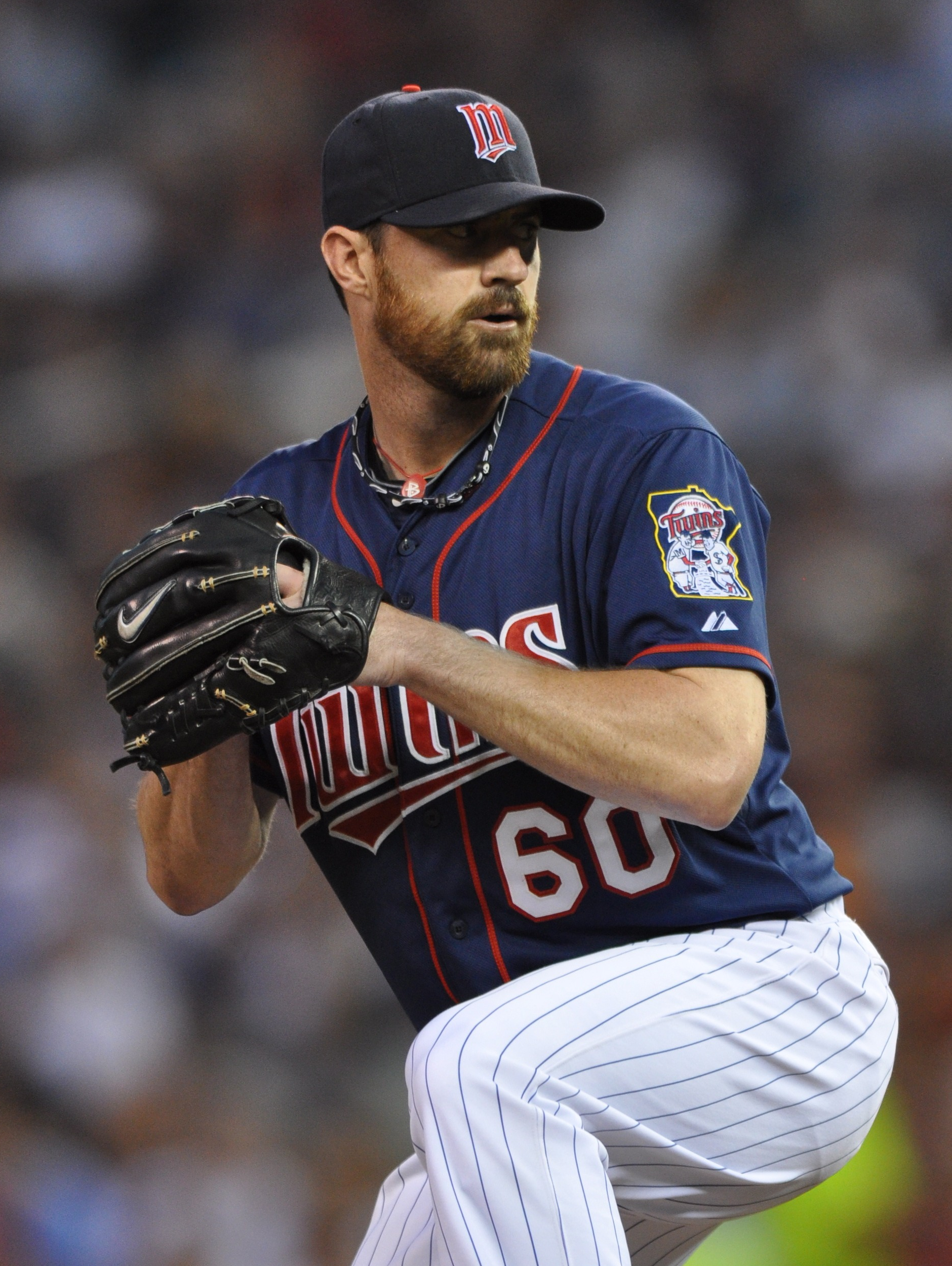
Jeff Gray wearing the Twins' 1998–2013 home navy alternate uniform with the navy "M" cap.

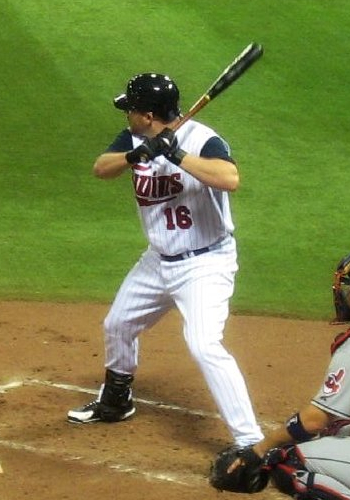
Jason Kubel wearing the Twins' 2006–2010 home sleeveless alternate uniform.

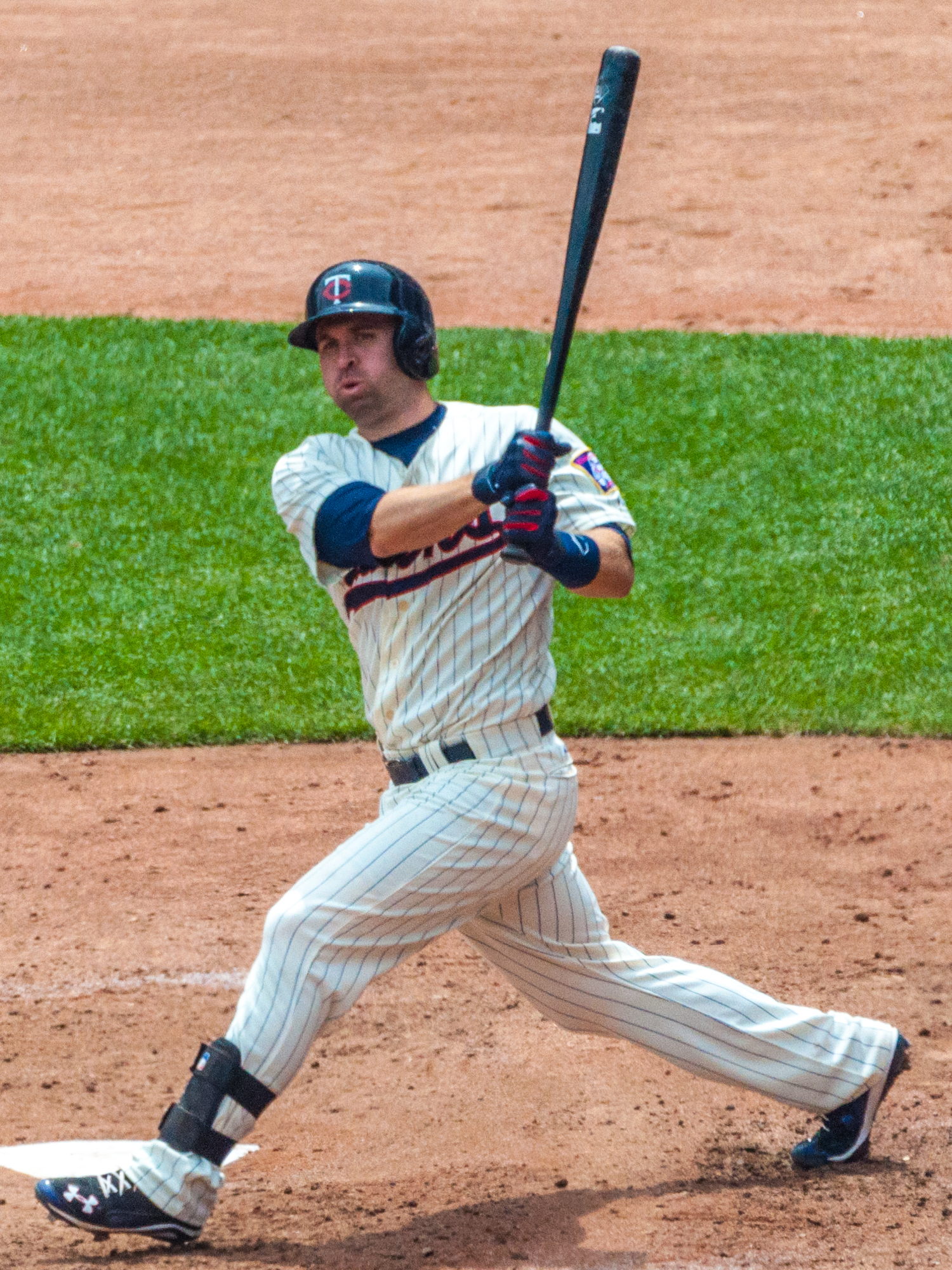
Brian Dozier wearing the Twins' 2010–2018 home throwback alternate uniform.

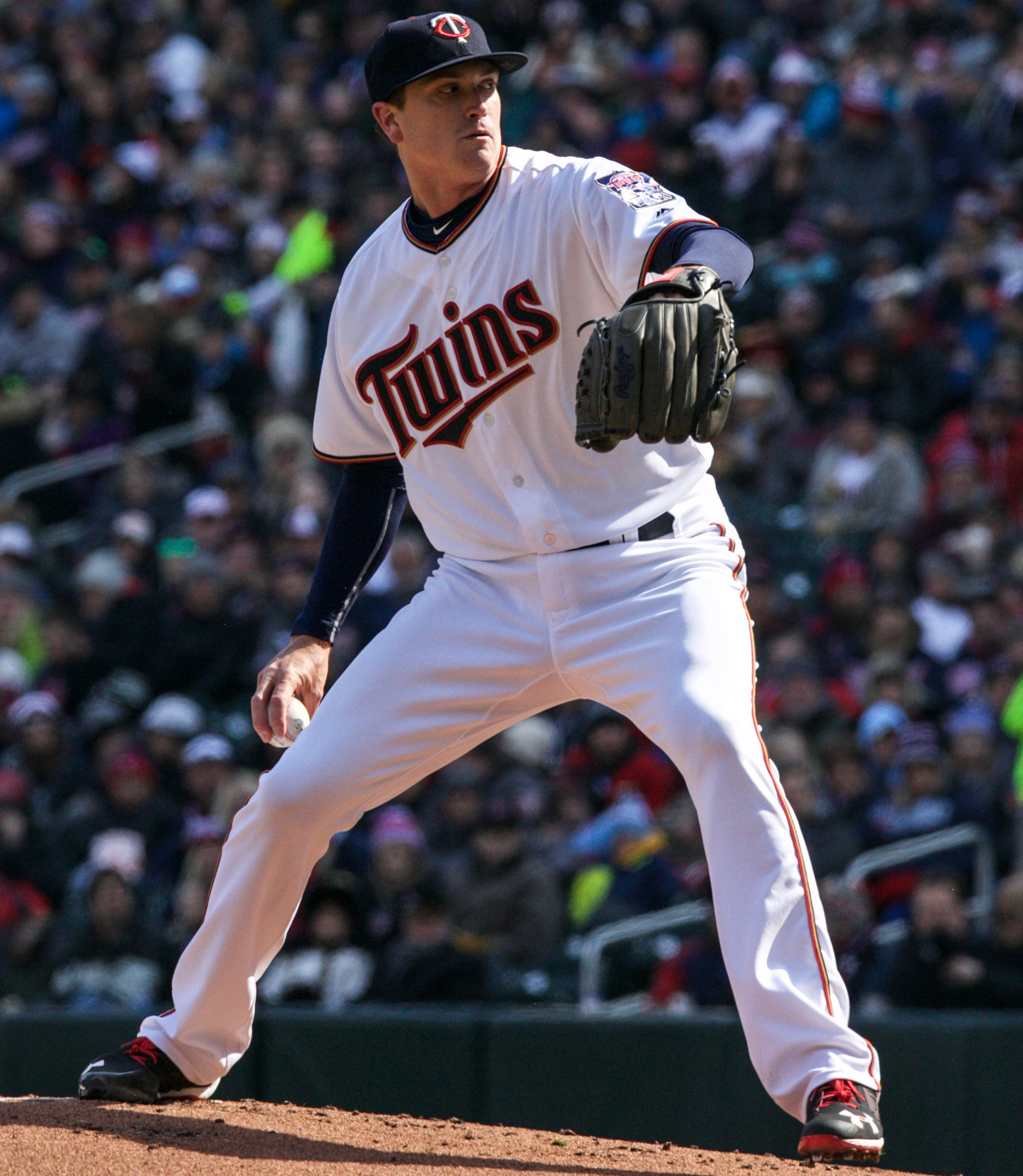
Kyle Gibson wearing the Twins' 2015–2022 home uniform.

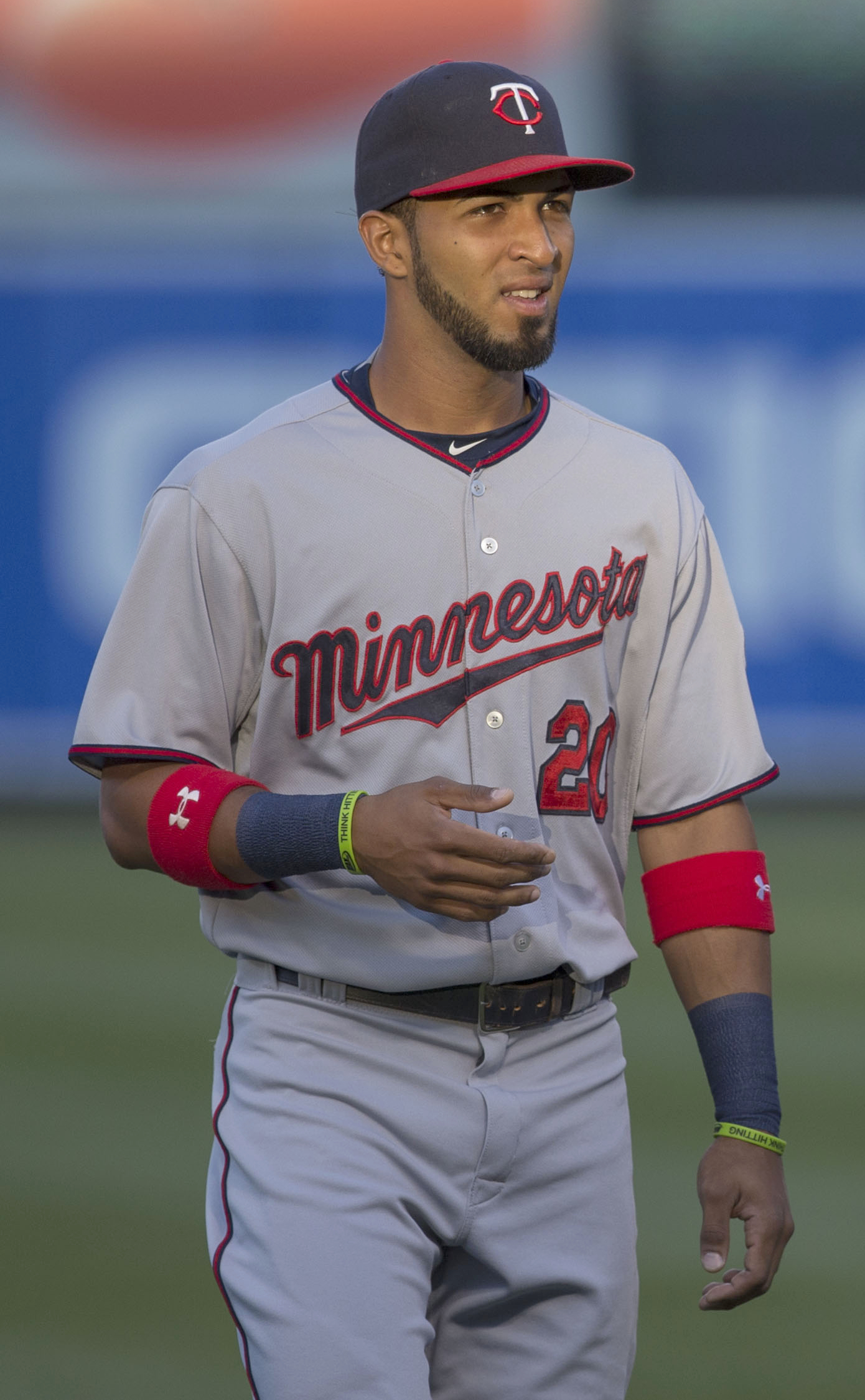
Eddie Rosario wearing the Twins' 2010–2022 road uniform.

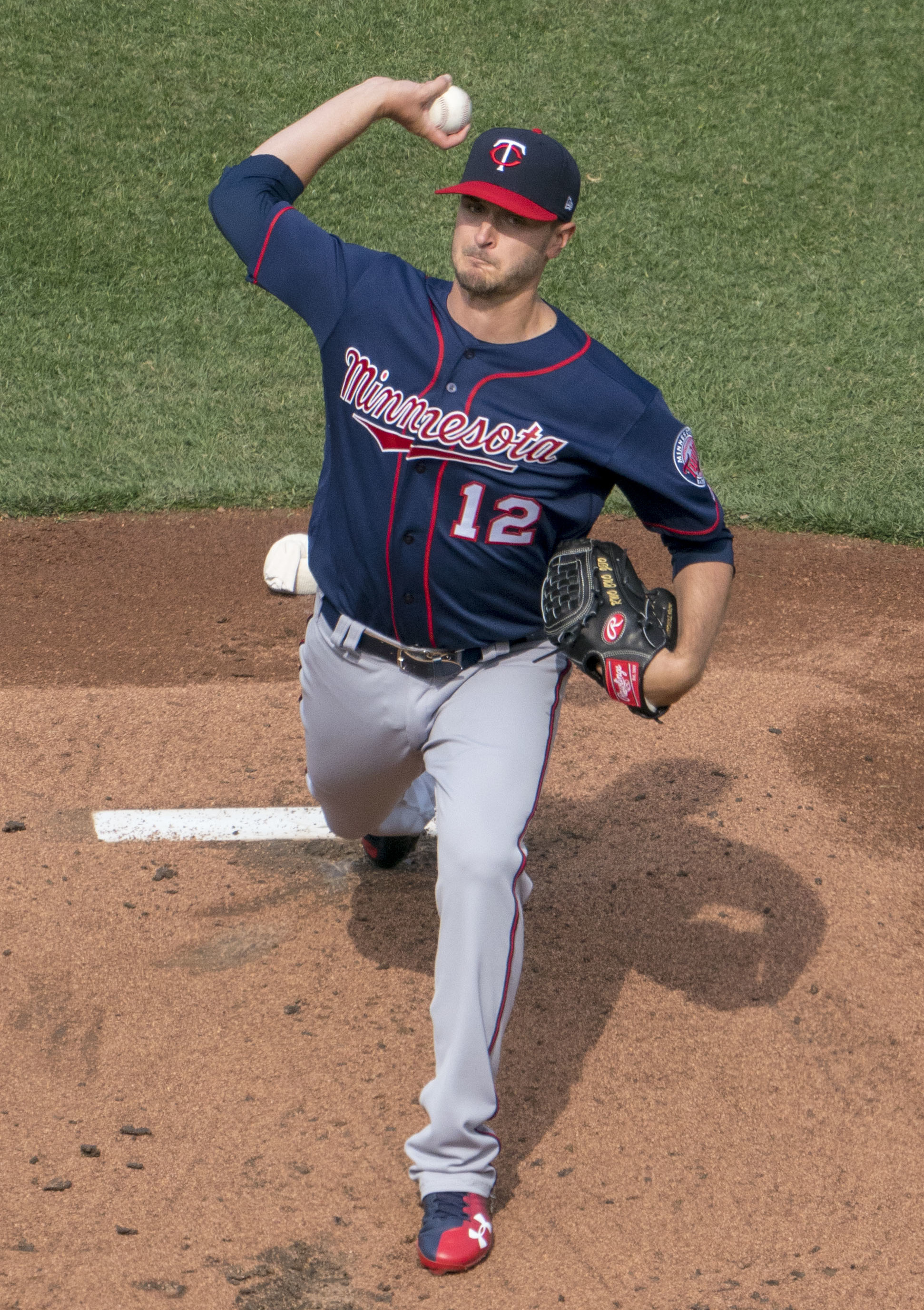
Jake Odorizzi wearing the Twins' 2010–2022 road navy alternate uniform.

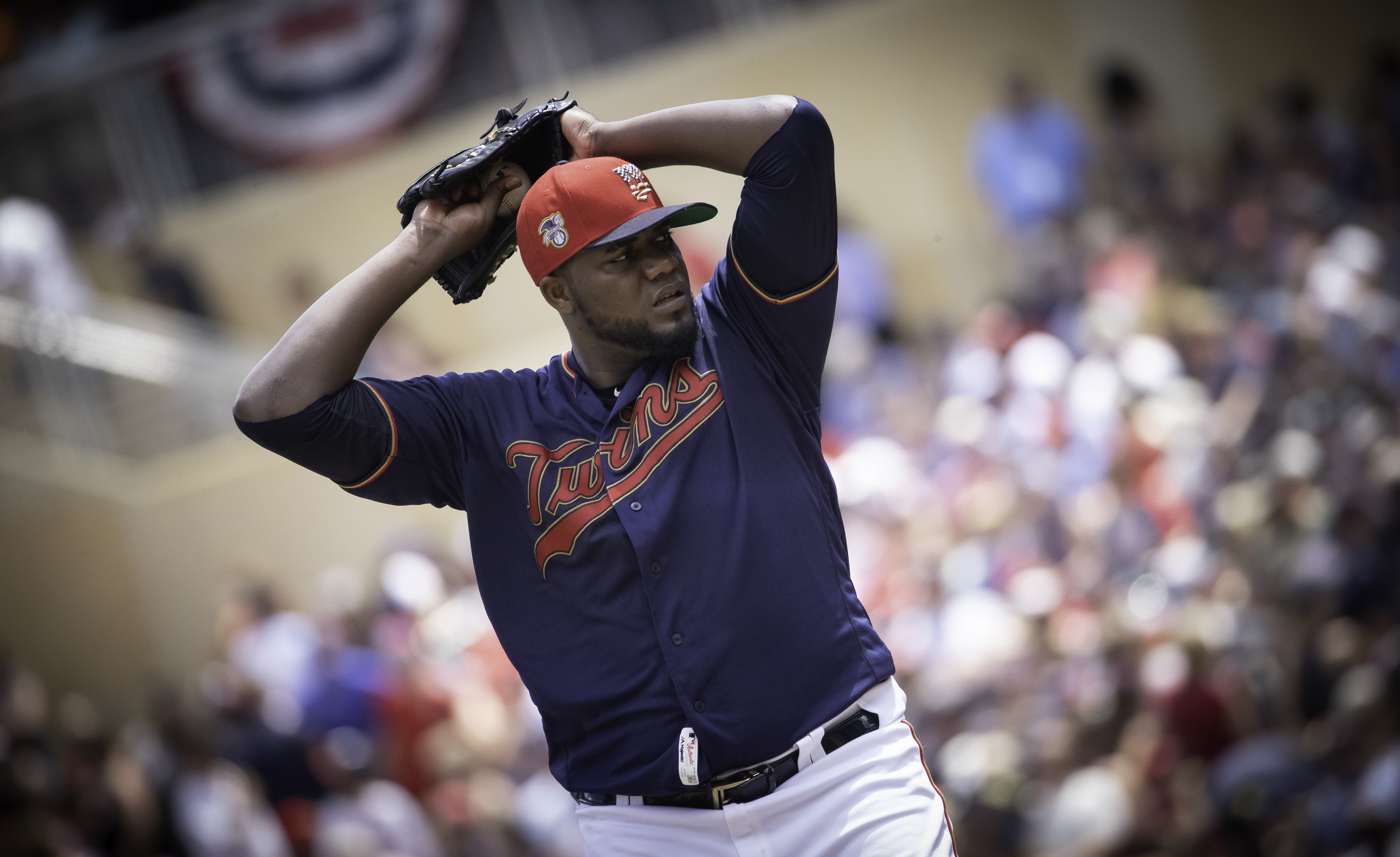
Michael Pineda wearing the Twins' 2019–2022 home navy alternate uniform with special Independence Day-themed red cap and navy bill.

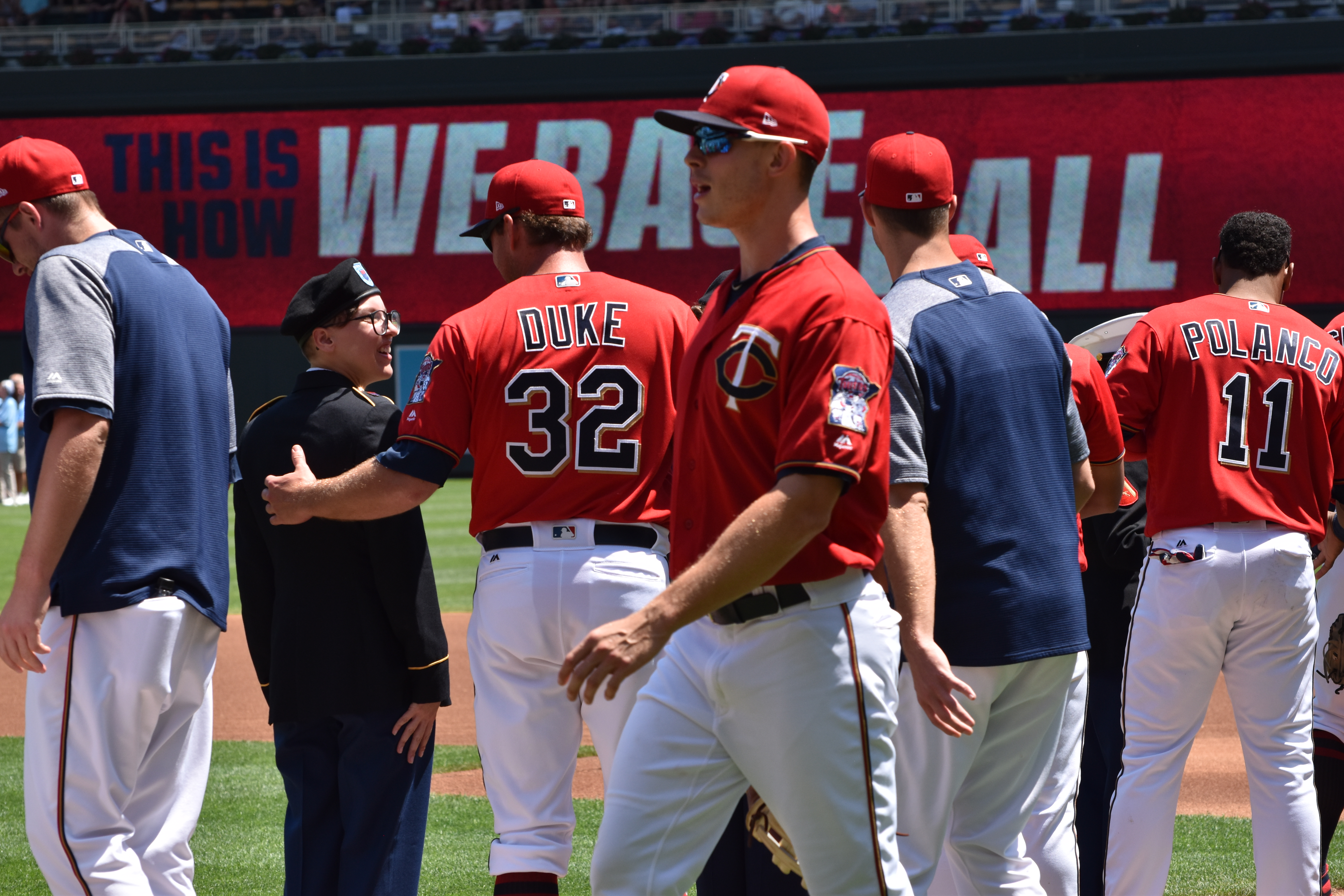
Twins players wearing the 2016–2022 home red alternate uniform with alternate red cap and navy bill.

== Roster ==
Minnesota Twins 2027 spring training roster
40-man roster		Non-roster invitees	Coaches / other
Pitchers: 20 Mick Abel; 50 Garrett Acton; 45 Travis Adams; 26 Taj Bradley; 58 David Festa; 57 Kody Funderburk; 94 Yoendrys Gómez; 24 Jeff Hoffman; 13 Dean Kremer; 49 Pablo López; 52 Zebby Matthews; 78 Andrew Morris; 35 Tommy Nance; 17 Bailey Ober; 53 Mike Paredes; 61 Connor Prielipp; 54 Marco Raya; 60 Kendry Rojas; 41 Joe Ryan; 44 Cole Sands	Catchers: 37 Víctor Caratini; Infielders: 2 Kody Clemens; 12 Kaelen Culpepper; 15 Luke Keaschall; 5 Ryan Kreidler; 22 Brooks Lee; 23 Royce Lewis; 1 Ben Ross; Outfielders: 25 Byron Buxton; 72 Gabriel González; 11 Walker Jenkins; 9 Trevor Larnach; 16 Austin Martin; 64 Hendry Méndez; 18 Alan Roden; 21 Emmanuel Rodríguez; 38 Matt Wallner		Manager: 8 Derek Shelton; Coaches: 67 Trevor Amicone (assistant hitting); 84 Keith Beauregard (hitting); 46 Ramon Borrego (third base); 75 Nate Dammann (quality control); 98 Anderson De La Rosa (bullpen catcher); 66 Toby Gardenhire (major league field coordinator); 68 Mark Hallberg (bench); 32 LaTroy Hawkins (bullpen); 98 Frank Nigro (bullpen catcher); 63 Mike Rabelo (assistant bench); 79 Rayden Sierra (assistant hitting); 0 Grady Sizemore (first base); Brian Reith (pitching); 37 active, 0 inactive, 0 non-roster invitees; 7-, 10-, or 15-day injured list; * Not on active roster; ^{†} Suspended list; Roster, coaches, and NRIs updated November 2, 2026; Transactions • Depth chart; → All MLB rosters

== Minor league affiliates ==
The Minnesota Twins farm system consists of six minor league affiliates.

Class	Team	League	Location	Ballpark	Affiliated
Triple-A	St. Paul Saints	International League	Saint Paul, Minnesota	CHS Field	2021
Double-A	Wichita Turbo Tubs	Texas League	Wichita, Kansas	Equity Bank Park	2021
High-A	Cedar Rapids Kernels	Midwest League	Cedar Rapids, Iowa	Veterans Memorial Stadium	2013
Single-A	Fort Myers Mighty Mussels	Florida State League	Fort Myers, Florida	Hammond Stadium	1993
Rookie	FCL Twins	Florida Complex League	Fort Myers, Florida	Lee County Sports Complex	1989
Rookie	DSL Twins	Dominican Summer League	Boca Chica, Santo Domingo	Baseball City Complex	2001

== Achievements ==
=== Baseball Hall of Fame members ===
Minnesota Twins Hall of Famers
Affiliation according to the National Baseball Hall of Fame and Museum
Washington Senators

Stan Coveleski
Joe Cronin
Ed Delahanty

Rick Ferrell
Lefty Gomez
**Goose Goslin** *

Clark Griffith *
**Bucky Harris** *
Whitey Herzog
**Walter Johnson** *

Heinie Manush *
**Sam Rice** *
Al Simmons

George Sisler
Tris Speaker
Early Wynn

Minnesota Twins

**Bert Blyleven** *
**Rod Carew** *

Steve Carlton
**Jim Kaat** *
**Harmon Killebrew** *

**Joe Mauer** *
Paul Molitor
Jack Morris

**Tony Oliva** *
David Ortiz
**Kirby Puckett** *

Jim Thome
Dave Winfield

- Players and managers listed in **bold** are depicted on their Hall of Fame plaques wearing a Twins or Senators cap insignia.
- * Washington Senators or Minnesota Twins listed as primary team according to the Hall of Fame

Molitor, Morris, and Winfield were all St. Paul natives who joined the Twins late in their careers and were warmly received as "hometown heroes", but were elected to the hall primarily on the basis of their tenures with other teams. Both Molitor and Winfield had their 3,000th hit with Minnesota, while Morris pitched a complete-game shutout for the Twins in game seven of the 1991 World Series. Molitor was the first player in history to hit a triple for his 3,000th hit.

Cronin, Goslin, Griffith, Harris, Johnson, Killebrew and Wynn are listed on the Washington Hall of Stars display at Nationals Park (previously they were listed at Robert F. Kennedy Stadium). So are Ossie Bluege, George Case, Joe Judge, George Selkirk, Roy Sievers, Cecil Travis, Mickey Vernon and Eddie Yost.

=== Ford C. Frick Award recipients ===
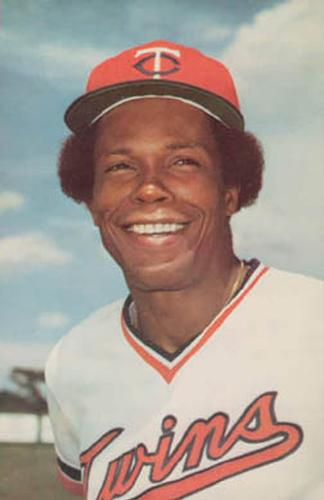
Rod Carew

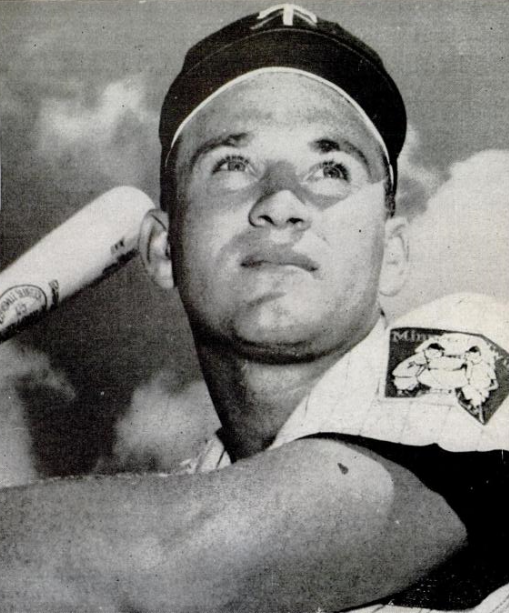
Harmon Killebrew

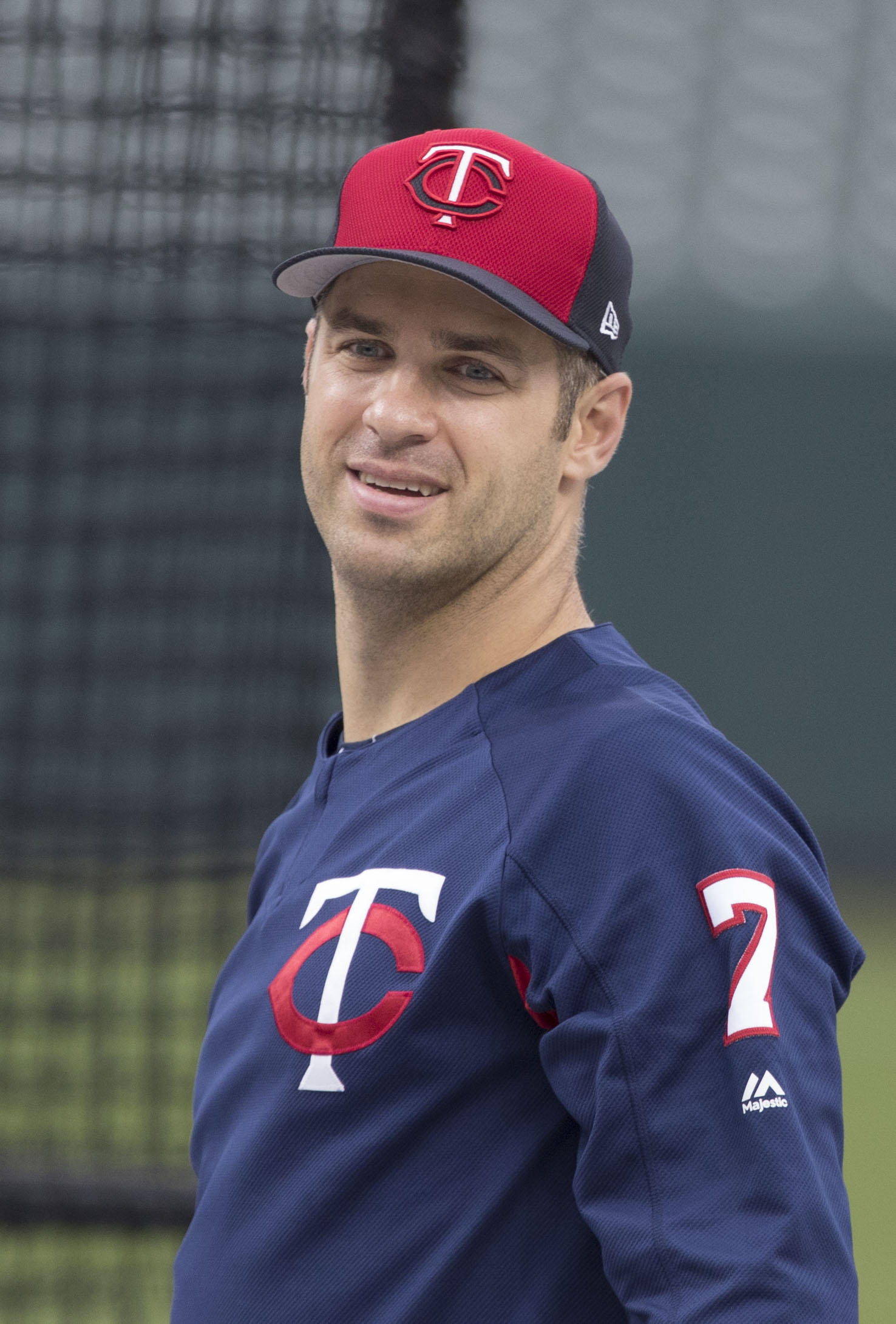
Joe Mauer

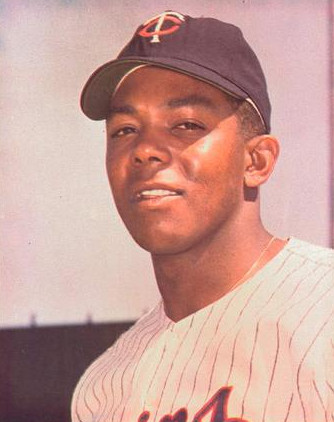
Tony Oliva

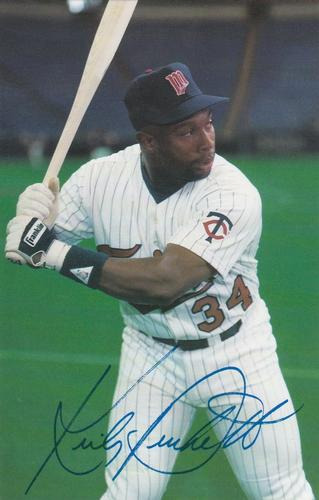
Kirby Puckett

Minnesota Twins Ford C. Frick Award recipients
Affiliation according to the National Baseball Hall of Fame and Museum

**Herb Carneal**

Russ Hodges

**Arch McDonald**

Chuck Thompson

Bob Wolff

- **Names in bold** received the award based primarily on their work as broadcasters for the Twins or Senators.

=== Team captains ===
- 3 Harmon Killebrew 1961–74

=== Twins Hall of Fame ===
Key
Year	Year inducted
**Bold**	Member of the Baseball Hall of Fame
†	Member of the Baseball Hall of Fame as a Twin
**Bold**	Recipient of the Hall of Fame's Ford C. Frick Award

**Minnesota Twins Hall of Fame**
Year	No.	Name	Position(s)	Tenure
2000	3	**Harmon Killebrew**^{†}	1B	1961–1974
2000	29	**Rod Carew**^{†}	2B	1967–1978
2000	6	**Tony Oliva**^{†}	RF/DH	1962–1976
2000	14	Kent Hrbek	1B	1981–1994
2000	34	**Kirby Puckett**^{†}	CF	1984–1995
2000	—	Calvin Griffith	President and Owner	1961–1984
2001	—	**Herb Carneal**^{†}	Radio Broadcaster	1962–2007
2001	36	**Jim Kaat**^{†}	P	1961–1973
2002	28	**Bert Blyleven**^{†}	P	1970–1976; 1985–1988
2002	10	Tom Kelly	Manager	1986–2001
2003	4	Bob Allison	OF	1961–1970
2003	—	Bob Casey	Public Address Announcer	1961–2004
2004	10	Earl Battey	C	1961–1967
2005	16	Frank Viola	P	1982–1989
2005	—	Carl Pohlad	Owner	1984–2009
2006	2	Zoilo Versalles	SS	1961–1967
2007	8	Gary Gaetti	3B	1981–1990
2007	—	Jim Rantz	Director of Minor Leagues	1986–2012
2008	38	Rick Aguilera	P	1989–1995; 1996–1999
2009	22, 23, 59	Brad Radke	P	1995–2006
2009	—	George Brophy	Front office executive	1961–1985
2010	7	Greg Gagne	SS	1983–1992
2011	31	Jim Perry	P	1963–1972
2012	17	Camilo Pascual	P	1961–1966
2013	18	Eddie Guardado	P	1993–2003, 2008
2013	—	Tom Mee	Media Relations Director	1961–1991
2016	—	John Gordon	Radio Broadcaster	1987–2011
2016	48	Torii Hunter	CF/RF	1997–2007, 2015
2017	5	Michael Cuddyer	RF	2001–2011
2017	—	Andy MacPhail	General Manager	1985–1994
2018	57	Johan Santana	P	2000–2007
2019	36	Joe Nathan	P	2004–2009, 2011
2019	—	Jerry Bell	President	1987–2002
2020	33	Justin Morneau	1B	2003–2013
2022	35	Ron Gardenhire	Coach/Manager	1991–2001; 2002–2014
2022	32	Dan Gladden	LF	1987–1991
2022	12	César Tovar	IF/OF	1965–1972
2023	7	**Joe Mauer**^{†}	C/1B	2004–2018
2024	—	Terry Ryan	GM	1994–2007, 2011–2016
2024	43	Rick Stelmaszek	Coach	1981–2012
2025	47	Corey Koskie	3B	1998–2004
2026	—	Dick Bremer	TV Broadcaster	1983–1985, 1987–2023

Chuck Knoblauch was voted into the Twins Hall of Fame in 2014, but due to his legal troubles the team canceled his induction.

=== Retired numbers ===
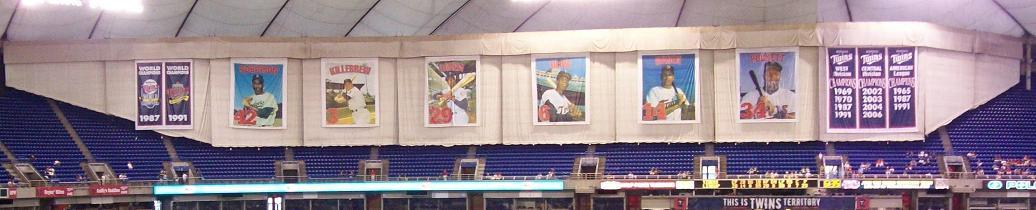
Banners and retired numbers displayed in the Metrodome

The Metrodome's upper deck in center and right fields was partly covered by a curtain containing banners of various titles won, and retired numbers. There was no acknowledgment of the Twins' prior championships in Washington and several Senator Hall of Famers, such as Walter Johnson, played in the days prior to numbers being used on uniforms. However, Killebrew played seven seasons as a Senator, including two full seasons as a regular prior to the move to Minnesota in 1961.

Prior to the addition of the banners, the Twins acknowledged their retired numbers on the Metrodome's outfield fence. Harmon Killebrew's #3 was the first to be displayed, as it was the only one the team had retired when they moved in. It was joined by Rod Carew's #29 in 1987, Tony Oliva's #6 in 1991, Kent Hrbek's #14 in 1995, and Kirby Puckett's #34 in 1997 before the Twins began hanging the banners to reduce capacity. The championships, meanwhile, were marked on the "Baggie" in right field.

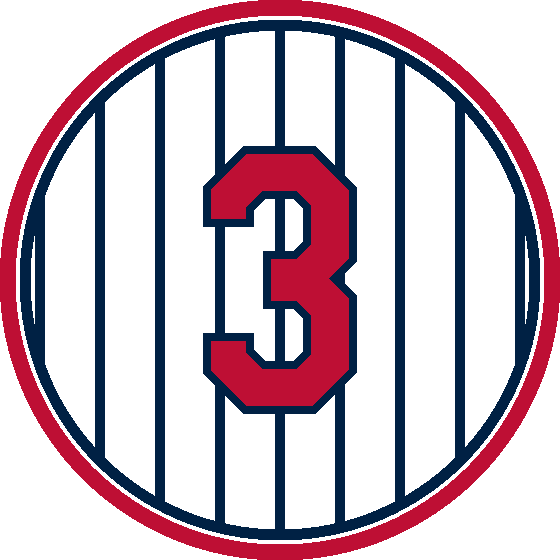
Harmon
Killebrew
LF, 1B, 3B
Retired May 4, 1975
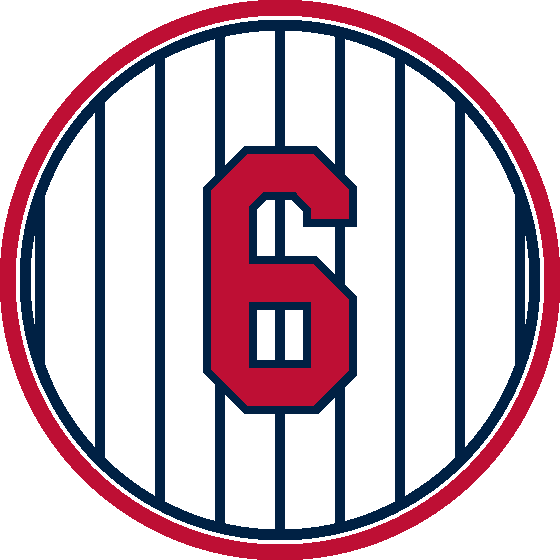
Tony
Oliva
RF, DH, Coach
Retired July 14, 1991
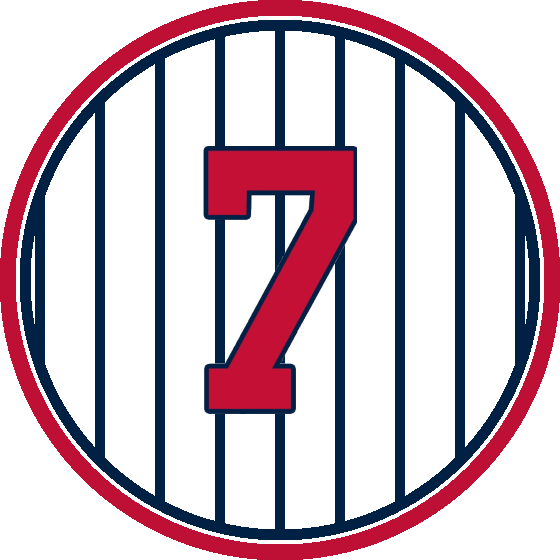
Joe
Mauer
C, 1B
Retired June 15, 2019
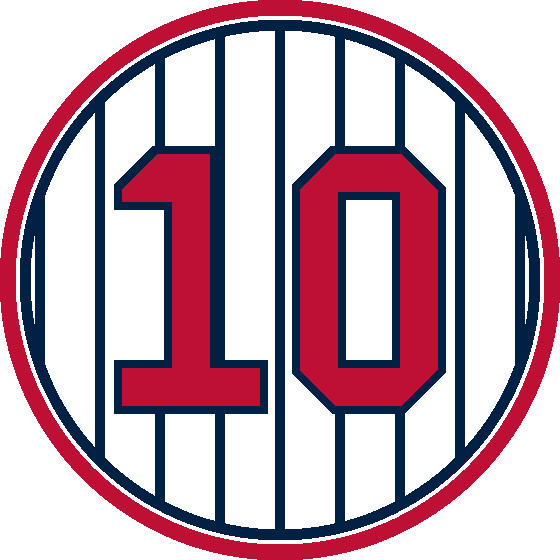
Tom
Kelly
Manager
Retired September 8, 2012
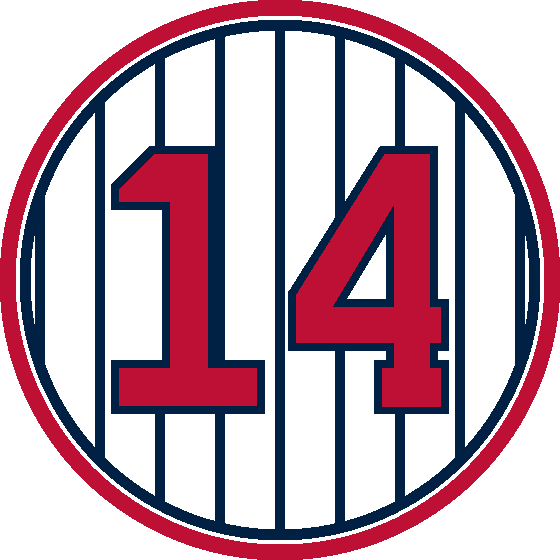
Kent
Hrbek
1B
Retired August 13, 1995
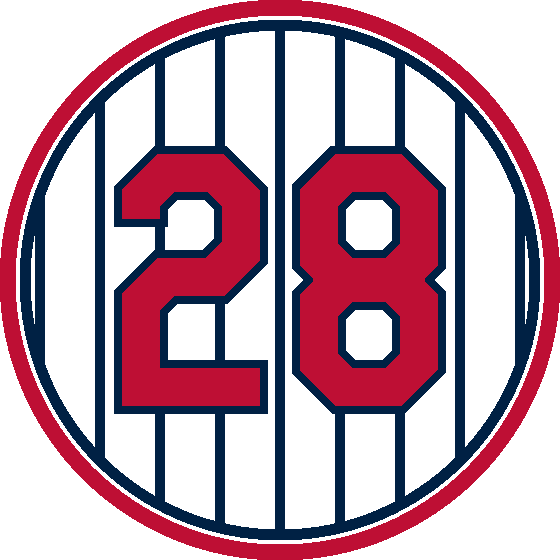
Bert
Blyleven
P
Retired July 16, 2011
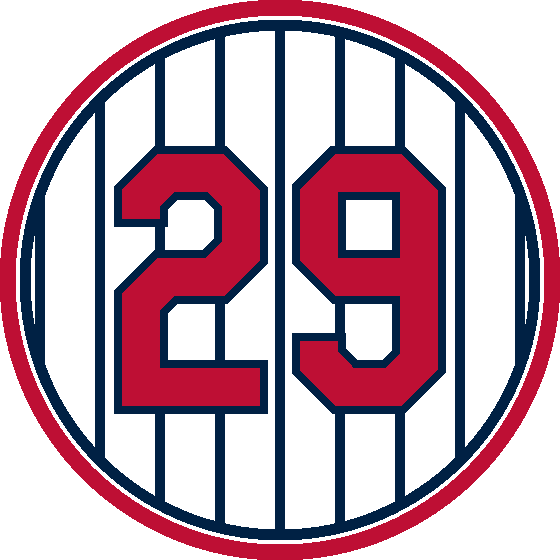
Rod
Carew
1B, 2B
Retired July 19, 1987
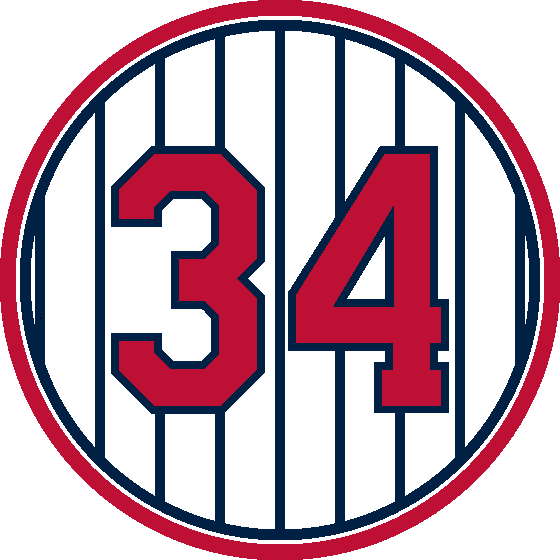
Kirby
Puckett
CF
Retired May 25, 1997
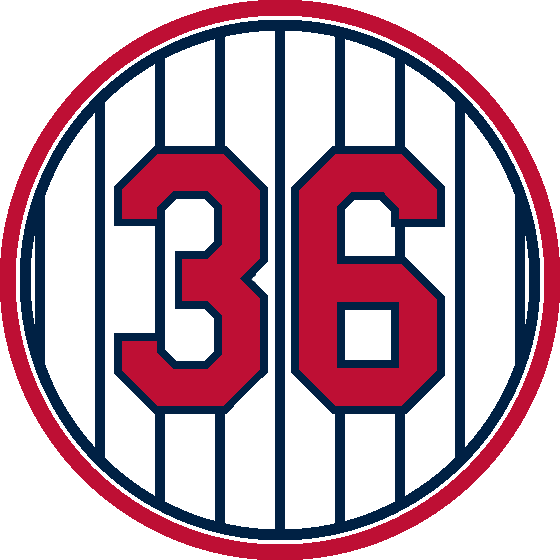
Jim
Kaat
P
Retired July 16, 2022
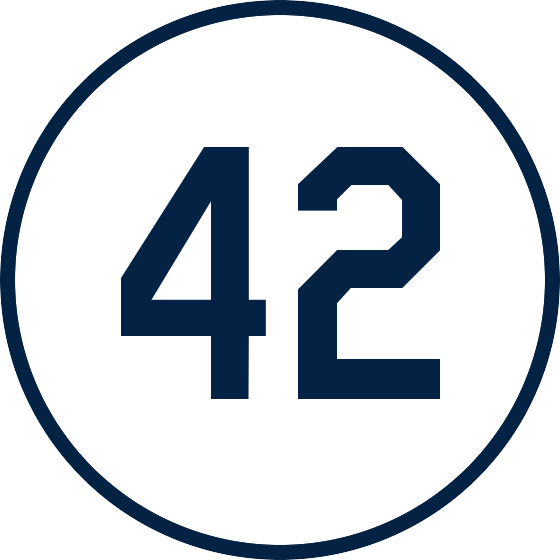
Jackie
Robinson
All MLB
Honored April 15, 1997
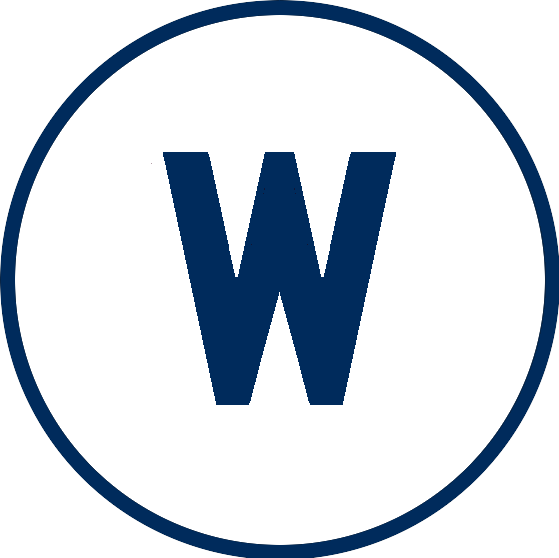
Washington
Senators
Team
Honored August 11, 2024

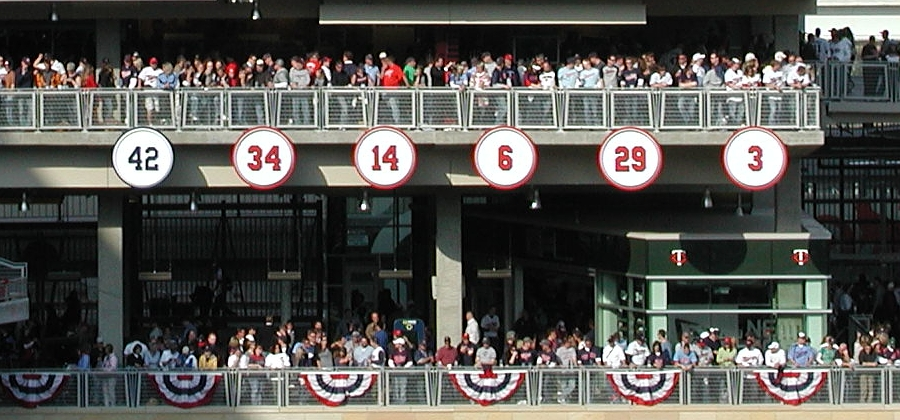
Target Field retired number signs in 2010.

In the Metrodome, the numbers ran in that order from left to right. In Target Field, they run from right to left, presumably to allow space for additional numbers in the future. The retired numbers also serve as entry points at Target Field, The center field gate is Gate No. 3, honoring Killebrew, the left-field gate is Gate No. 6, honoring Oliva, the home plate gate is Gate No. 14, for Hrbek, the right field gate serves as Gate No. 29, in tribute to Carew, and the plaza gate is known as Gate No. 34, honoring Puckett. All honorees with retired numbers except for Hrbek and Kelly have been inducted into the Hall of Fame.

The numbers that have been retired hang within Target Field in front of the tower that serves as the Twins' executive offices in left field foul territory. The championships banners have been replaced by small pennants that fly on masts at the back of the left-field upper deck. Those pennants, along with the flags flying in the plaza behind right field, serve as a visual cue for the players, suggesting the wind direction and speed.

Jackie Robinson's No. 42 was retired by Major League Baseball on April 15, 1997, and formally honored by the Twins on May 23, 1997. Robinson's number was positioned to the left of the Twins numbers in both venues. On August 11, 2024, the Twins elected to erect a permanent display of a "W" as a "reminder of our franchise's legacy as a charter member of the American League", referring to the Washington Senators and their World Series victory in 1924.

== Team seasons ==
Year	Regular season						Postseason		Result
Year	Wins	Losses	Win %	Finish	Attendance	Attendance per Game	Record	Win %	Result
2001	85	77	.525	2nd – AL Central	1,782,929	22,011	—	—	
2002	94	67	.584	1st – AL Central	1,924,473	23,906	4–6	.400	Won ALDS vs Oakland Athletics, 3–2; Lost ALCS to Anaheim Angels, 1–4
2003	90	72	.556	1st – AL Central	1,946,011	24,025	1–3	.250	Lost ALDS to New York Yankees, 1–3
2004	92	70	.568	1st – AL Central	1,911,490	23,599	1–3	.250	Lost ALDS to New York Yankees, 1–3
2005	83	79	.512	3rd – AL Central	2,034,243	25,114	—	—	
2006	96	66	.593	1st – AL Central	2,285,018	28,210	0–3	.000	Lost ALDS to Oakland Athletics, 0–3
2007	79	83	.488	3rd – AL Central	2,296,347	28,349	—	—	
2008	88	75	.540	2nd – AL Central	2,302,611	28,427	—	—	
2009	87	76	.534	1st – AL Central	2,416,237	29,466	0–3	.000	Lost ALDS to New York Yankees, 0–3
2010	94	68	.580	1st – AL Central	3,223,640	39,798	0–3	.000	Lost ALDS to New York Yankees, 0–3
2011	63	99	.389	5th – AL Central	3,168,107	39,112	—	—	
2012	66	96	.407	5th – AL Central	2,776,354	34,275	—	—	
2013	66	96	.407	4th – AL Central	2,477,644	30,588	—	—	
2014	70	92	.432	5th – AL Central	2,250,606	27,785	—	—	
2015	83	79	.521	2nd – AL Central	2,220,054	27,408	—	—	
2016	59	103	.364	5th – AL Central	1,963,912	24,246	—	—	
2017	85	77	.525	2nd – AL Central	2,051,279	25,324	0–1	.000	Lost AL Wild Card Game (Yankees)
2018	78	84	.481	2nd – AL Central	1,959,197	24,489	—	—	
2019	101	61	.623	1st – AL Central	2,294,152	28,322	0–3	.000	Lost ALDS to New York Yankees, 0–3
2020	36	24	.600	1st – AL Central	0	0	0–2	.000	Lost ALWCS to Houston Astros, 0–2
2021	73	89	.451	5th – AL Central	1,310,199	16,377	—	—	
2022	78	84	.481	3rd – AL Central	1,801,128	22,236	—	—	
2023	87	75	.537	1st – AL Central	1,974,124	24,372	3–3	.500	Won ALWCS vs Toronto Blue Jays, 2–0; Lost ALDS to Houston Astros, 1–3
2024	82	80	.506	4th – AL Central	1,951,616	24,094	—	—	
2025	70	92	.432	4th – AL Central	1,768,718	22,108	—	—	
Total as Twins	5036	5091	.497	–	–	–	28–45	.384	-

== Radio and television ==
In 2007, the Twins took the rights to the broadcasts in-house and created the Twins Radio Network (TRN). With that new network in place the Twins secured a new Metro Affiliate flagship radio station in KSTP (AM 1500). It replaced WCCO (AM 830), which held broadcast rights for the Twins since the team moved to Minneapolis in 1961. For 2013, the Twins moved to FM radio on KTWN-FM 96.3 K-Twin, which is owned by the Pohlad family. The original radio voices of the Twins in 1961 were Ray Scott, Halsey Hall and Bob Wolff. After the first season, Herb Carneal replaced Wolff. Twins TV and radio broadcasts were originally sponsored by the Hamm's Brewing Company. In 2009, Treasure Island Resort & Casino became the first-ever naming rights partner for the Twins Radio Network, making the commercial name of TRN the Treasure Island Baseball Network. In 2017, it was announced that WCCO would become the flagship station the Twins again starting in 2018, thus returning the team back to its original station after 11 years.

Cory Provus is the current radio play by play announcer, taking over in 2012 for longtime Twins voice John Gordon who retired following the 2011 season. Former Twins OF Dan Gladden serves as color commentator.

TRN broadcasts are originated from the studios at Minnesota News Network and Minnesota Farm Networks. Kris Atteberry hosts the pre-game show, the "Lineup Card" and the "Post-game Download" from those studios except when filling in for Provus or Gladden when they are on vacation.

On April 1, 2007, Herb Carneal, the radio voice of the Twins for all but one year of their existence, died at his home in Minnetonka after a long battle with a list of illnesses. Carneal is in the broadcasters wing of the Baseball Hall of Fame.

In October 2024, as a result of bankruptcy proceedings involving former broadcaster Diamond Sports Group, Major League Baseball's local media division announced that it would take over the production and distribution of Twins games starting with the 2025 season; the Twins would later announce a deal to simulcast ten regular season games on Minneapolis-St. Paul Fox station KMSP-TV and Gray Media stations in the Twins' outer markets.

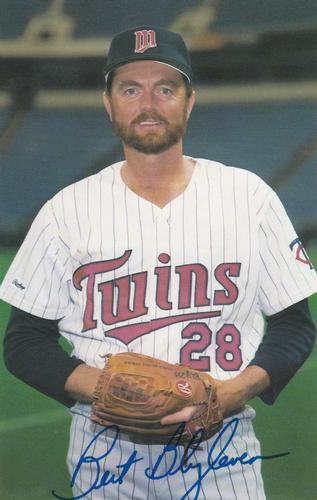
Hall of Famer Bert Blyleven played 11 seasons for the Twins.

Prior to 2025, the television rights were held by Bally Sports North (now FanDuel Sports Network North) with Dick Bremer as the play-by-play announcer. Former Twins players Roy Smalley, Justin Morneau, Glen Perkins, and LaTroy Hawkins served as analysts.

In 2024, the Twins announced that Provus would move to TV play-by-play following the retirement of Dick Bremer who eventually moved to an advisory role in the front office. Atteberry replaced Provus on the radio side.

Bob Casey was the Twins first public-address announcer starting in 1961 and continuing until his death in 2005. He was well known for his unique delivery and his signature announcements of "No smoking in the Metrodome, either go outside or quit!" (or "go back to Boston", etc.), "Batting 3rd, the center-fielder, No. 34, Kirby Puckett!!!" and asking fans not to 'throw anything or anybody' onto the field.

== Community activities ==
- Minnesota Twins Community Fund – Play Ball! Minnesota

== Team and franchise traditions ==
Fans wave a Homer Hanky to rally the team during play-offs and other crucial games. The Homer Hanky was created by Terrie Robbins of the Star Tribune newspaper in the Twin Cities in 1987. It was her idea to originally give away 60,000 inaugural Homer Hankies. That year, over 2.3 million Homer Hankies were distributed.

The party atmosphere of the Twins clubhouse after a win is well known, the team's players unwinding with loud rock music (usually the choice of the winning pitcher) and video games.

The club has several hazing rituals, such as requiring the most junior relief pitcher on the team to carry water and snacks to the bullpen in a brightly colored small child's backpack (Barbie in 2005, SpongeBob SquarePants in 2006, Hello Kitty in 2007, Disney Princess and Tinkerbell in 2009, Chewbacca and Darth Vader in 2010), and many of its players, both past and present, are notorious pranksters. For example, Bert Blyleven earned the nickname "The Frying Dutchman" for his ability to pull the "hotfoot" – which entails crawling under the bench in the dugout and lighting a teammate's shoelaces on fire.

The team introduced T.C. Bear, its costumed mascot, on April 3, 2000.

== Rivalries ==
=== Chicago White Sox ===
The Twins have a divisional rivalry with the Chicago White Sox, which re-emerged in the 2000s as the two teams consistently battled for the AL Central Crown. The Twins won the division in 2002, 2003, 2004, 2006, and 2009, with the Sox winning in 2000, 2005, and 2008; many of those years, their rival was the division runner-up. The teams met in the 2008 American League Central tie-breaker game, which was necessitated by the two clubs finishing the season with identical records. The White Sox won this game 1–0 on a Jim Thome home run.

=== Milwaukee Brewers: Border Battle ===
The Twins also have an interleague rivalry with the Milwaukee Brewers, known as the "Border Battle." Originally an intradivisional rivalry, it was most heated from 1994 to 1997 when the Brewers and Twins were both in the American League Central Division, which was established in the 1994 realignment. The rivalry became an interleague rivalry when the Brewers moved to the National League Central Division for the 1998 season.

== Minnesota Twins in popular culture ==
- In Little Big League, the Minnesota Twins is inherited by a 12-year-old boy who goes on to manage the team.
- In Terminator 2: Judgment Day, Danny, the son of Miles Dyson, wears a Minnesota Twins cap. The movie was released in 1991, which was the same year the Twins won the World Series.
- In Major League: Back to the Minors, the character Roger Dorn, from previous Major League movies, is owner of the Minnesota Twins.
- In the 1997 film McHale's Navy, Lt. Commander Quinton McHale wears a Minnesota Twins cap.
- In the TV series Beverly Hills, 90210, twins Brenda and Brandon are from Minneapolis and wear Twins gear.

== Notes ==
Awards and achievements
Preceded by New York Yankees; 1923	World Series champions Washington Senators; 1924	Succeeded by Pittsburgh Pirates; 1925
Preceded by New York Mets; 1986	World Series champions Minnesota Twins; 1987	Succeeded by Los Angeles Dodgers; 1988
Preceded by Cincinnati Reds; 1990	World Series champions Minnesota Twins; 1991	Succeeded by Toronto Blue Jays; 1992–1993
Preceded by New York Yankees; 1921–1923	American League champions Washington Senators; 1924–1925	Succeeded by New York Yankees; 1926–1928
Preceded by New York Yankees; 1932	American League champions Washington Senators; 1933	Succeeded by Detroit Tigers; 1934–1935
Preceded by New York Yankees; 1960–1964	American League champions Minnesota Twins; 1965	Succeeded by Baltimore Orioles; 1966
Preceded by Boston Red Sox; 1986	American League champions Minnesota Twins; 1987	Succeeded by Oakland Athletics; 1988–1990
Preceded by Oakland Athletics; 1988–1990	American League champions Minnesota Twins; 1991	Succeeded by Toronto Blue Jays; 1992–1993
