= Bob Casey (baseball announcer) =

American baseball announcer (1925–2005)

- Born: Robert John Casey; April 11, 1925
- Died: March 27, 2005 (aged 79); Minneapolis, Minnesota, US
- Education: University of Minnesota
- Occupation: Sports commentator
- Years active: 1947–2005
- Children: 3
- Awards: Purple Heart; Minnesota Twins Hall of Fame
- Sports commentary career
- Genre: Public address announcer
- Sport(s): MLB, NFL, NBA
- Employer: Minnesota Twins

Robert John Casey (April 11, 1925 – March 27, 2005) was an American public address announcer for the Minnesota Twins from their founding until his death. He was the announcer for 4,500 sporting events during his career.

Casey was a Boeing B-17 Flying Fortress turret gunner during World War II. He started sports announcing with the Minneapolis Lakers and Minneapolis Millers before the Twins moved to Minnesota in 1961. Over 44 seasons, Casey announced more than 3,000 Twins games, plus more than 1,000 other sporting events. He was known for his playful commentary, intentional and unintentional gaffes, and announcement of "Noooooooooooooo smoking!" in the Metrodome. He entered the Twins' Hall of Fame in 2003.

== Early and personal life ==
Robert John Casey was born on April 11, 1925. He was a native of Minneapolis. Serving in the United States Air Force during World War II as a Boeing B-17 Flying Fortress turret gunner, he was wounded in combat and received a Purple Heart. He did not like to talk about his time in the military. Attending the University of Minnesota on the G.I. Bill, he became a student manager for Minnesota Golden Gophers basketball team. During that time, after the Minneapolis Millers traded away Steve Gerkin for Otey Clark in 1947, Casey remarked that he thought Clark was a mediocre pitcher.

Casey had a wife, Rosemary, and three sons, Mike, Tom, and Joe.

== Career ==
Casey got his start in announcing when Sid Hartman, a childhood friend, invited him to fill in for Halsey Hall for a Minneapolis Lakers game in 1947. In 1951, Casey also began to serve as the announcer of the AAA minor league Minneapolis Millers, a position he held for 10 years. Moreover, Casey's career included announcement engagements for Minnesota Vikings.

In 1961, Casey began his work as the in-stadium public address announcer at the Metropolitan Stadium for the Minnesota Twins at their inaugural game. Casey's voice became an iconic part of the Minnesota baseball experience, known for his style and signature player introductions. Only missing "a handful of Twins games" during his tenure with the team, Casey was well known for having a raspy voice and distinctive style of delivery. Casey was described as a "quirky curmudgeon", and was affectionately called "angry" by Jon Miller.

In contrast with other public address announcers, Casey would make his commentary humorous; once, when ex-Twin Chuck Knoblauch was visiting and fans were throwing items at him, Casey yelled "please stop throwing things, this is an important game! What's the matter with you?" He would introduce star Kirby Puckett as "Kir-BEEEEEEEEEE PUCK-it!", remind fans there was "noooooooooooooo smoking" at the Metrodome, and that "if you must smoke, go back to [whatever city the opposing team was from]", and not to "throw anything, or anybody, onto the field".

Casey was also known for his occasional butchering of player names and calls on the field, both accidentally and on purpose, naming Dustan Mohr as Dustin Hoffman, Omar Vizquel as Ozzie Virgil, and Adam Kennedy as "Pat". Having been advised of a stadium bomb threat on August 25, 1970, instructed to keep fans calm, he announced at 9:15 p.m. "The Twins have been advised by Bloomington police that there will be an explosion here at the Met at 9:30. Please leave the stadium in an orderly fashion." While announcing a Minnesota Vikings game, he called a 15-yard penalty against the New York Giants for having an "illegitimate" player on the field.

By 1998, Casey had only missed three games as an announcer, when his sons graduated from college. He was inducted as the 12th member of the Minnesota Twins Hall of Fame in 2003; by then, he had announced nearly 3,500 games. Twins president Dave St. Peter said Casey's voice was "synonymous with the Minnesota Twins".

== Death and legacy ==
Casey departed for spring training with the Twins in Fort Myers, Florida, on March 7, 2005, but soon after developed pneumonia and had to return to Minnesota. Casey died several weeks later, on March 27, 2005, at the Veterans Affairs Medical Center in Minneapolis. He was 79 years old, fifteen days before what would have been his 80th birthday. In addition to the pneumonia, he had been suffering from liver cancer. He had received last rites two days earlier.

Alex Rodriguez, who had developed a relationship with Casey over the years, had a phone conversation with him before he died. Casey had said Kirby Puckett and Alex Rodriguez were his favorite players, and had even asked Alex to help him take a ceremonial first pitch that June.

Kent Hrbek, Tony Oliva, Dan Gladden, and Jack Morris served as pallbearers for Casey at his March 30, 2005, funeral at St. Olaf Catholic Church in Minneapolis. He is buried at Fort Snelling National Cemetery. April 8, 2005, was declared to be "Robert J. 'Bob' Casey Day" by Minnesota governor Tim Pawlenty. April 8 was the Twins home opener vs. the White Sox, and was dedicated as a tribute to Casey. There was an on-field tribute before the game, and members of the Casey family shared PA duties during the game.

From the founding of the Twins until his death, Casey was the only public address announcer in the team's history. During his life, he announced more than 4,500 sporting events for the Twins, Lakers, Millers, Vikings, North Stars, and NCAA basketball tournaments. He had planned to retire after the 2005 season.
