= 2025 Minnesota Twins season =

2025 Minnesota Twins
- League: American League
- Division: Central
- Ballpark: Target Field
- City: Minneapolis, Minnesota
- Record: 70–92 (.432)
- Divisional place: 4th
- Owner: Jim Pohlad
- President: Dave St. Peter
- President, Baseball Operations: Derek Falvey
- General manager: Jeremy Zoll
- Manager: Rocco Baldelli
- Television: MLB.tv
- Radio: WCCO
- Stats: ESPN.com; Baseball Reference

The 2025 Minnesota Twins season was the 65th season for the Minnesota Twins franchise in the Twin Cities of Minnesota, their 16th season at Target Field, and the 125th overall in the American League. On July 12, outfielder Byron Buxton would hit for the first cycle in Target Field history. That game also featured a Buxton bobblehead stadium giveaway to fans.

At the trade deadline, ownership and the front office would initiate a “fire sale” that would see 11 players off of the 40-man roster traded away. These players included key contributors to the 2023 team that broke the playoff losing streak such as Willi Castro, Jhoan Duran, Griffin Jax, Louis Varland, and Carlos Correa, who waived his no-trade clause to return to the Houston Astros. A quote by reporter Jon Morosi had been misinterpreted by multiple outlets that pitcher Joe Ryan had been traded to the Boston Red Sox. Ryan himself briefly believed the report. Buxton, who has a full no-trade clause in his contract, made it clear at the All-Star Game that he would refuse any trades involving himself, even if it were to his hometown team Atlanta Braves. Buxton called Minnesota “home” and said he will be “a Twin for life”. Despite this, six teams called the Twins inquiring about Buxton, including Atlanta and the New York Mets.

The moves, especially the Correa trade which saw the Twins send $30 million along with Correa in exchange for an unranked minor league prospect, were met with skepticism and criticism from fans and media alike concerning the motivations of the front office and ownership. This included former Twins player and current Twins announcer Trevor Plouffe, who voiced his frustration with the team's moves on X calling them “a bloodbath” and sympathizing with fans.

Many in the media believed these moves were made to shed payroll to help progress towards a potential sale of the team, which was announced the year prior. President of baseball operations Derek Falvey sent an email to Twins season ticket holders the following day saying “We know moves like this spark reactions. That’s natural” and the moves were made to position the Twins to “compete at a higher level, not just in the short term, but in a way that can endure the ups and downs of a long season.”

The Twins failed to improve on their 82–80 record in 2024 and they had their first losing season since 2022. They were eliminated from playoff contention for the second consecutive season on September 13. After the season concluded, manager Rocco Baldelli was fired.

A highlight of the season was a 13-game winning streak from May 3 through May 18. The streak was the second-longest in MLB for the season and was the second-longest in Twins franchise history since the team relocated to Minnesota in 1961.

The Minnesota Twins drew an average home attendance of 22,108, 24th in MLB and their lowest since 2021 (which featured overall lower attendance).

== Offseason ==
The Twins finished the 2024 season with an 82–80 record, a five-game regression from their 87–75 record in 2023.

In January, the Twins announced a new broadcasting arrangement, in conjunction with MLB.tv, that would remove blackouts from local Twins games.

In February, the Twins signed outfielder Harrison Bader to a one-year contract worth $6.25 million.

=== Potential ownership change ===
On October 10, 2024, the Pohlad family, who have owned the Twins since 1984, announced they would be exploring a sale of the franchise. In August 2025, the Pohlads backtracked, saying they would not sell the team but added new investors. The Pohlads had sought a $1.7 billion price for the Twins, but the team also had $425 million in debt.

== Season standings ==
=== American League Central ===
AL Central
Team	W	L	Pct.	GB	Home	Road
Cleveland Guardians	88	74	.543	—	45‍–‍36	43‍–‍38
Detroit Tigers	87	75	.537	1	46‍–‍35	41‍–‍40
Kansas City Royals	82	80	.506	6	43‍–‍38	39‍–‍42
Minnesota Twins	70	92	.432	18	38‍–‍43	32‍–‍49
Chicago White Sox	60	102	.370	28	33‍–‍48	27‍–‍54

=== American League Wild Card ===
Division leaders
Team	W	L	Pct.
Toronto Blue Jays	94	68	.580
Seattle Mariners	90	72	.556
Cleveland Guardians	88	74	.543

Wild Card teams (Top 3 teams qualify for postseason)
Team	W	L	Pct.	GB
New York Yankees	94	68	.580	+7
Boston Red Sox	89	73	.549	+2
Detroit Tigers	87	75	.537	—
Houston Astros	87	75	.537	—
Kansas City Royals	82	80	.506	5
Texas Rangers	81	81	.500	6
Tampa Bay Rays	77	85	.475	10
Athletics	76	86	.469	11
Baltimore Orioles	75	87	.463	12
Los Angeles Angels	72	90	.444	15
Minnesota Twins	70	92	.432	17
Chicago White Sox	60	102	.370	27

=== Record vs. opponents ===
==== Record vs. American League ====
2025 American League record Source: MLB Standings Grid – 2025
Team	ATH	BAL	BOS	CWS	CLE	DET	HOU	KC	LAA	MIN	NYY	SEA	TB	TEX	TOR	NL
Athletics	—	4–2	3–3	5–1	2–4	4–2	8–5	4–2	4–9	4–3	2–4	6–7	3–3	5–8	2–5	20–28
Baltimore	2–4	—	5–8	6–0	3–4	1–5	3–4	2–4	5–1	0–6	4–9	5–1	7–6	2–4	6–7	24–24
Boston	3–3	8–5	—	4–3	4–2	2–4	4–2	4–2	1–5	3–3	9–4	3–3	10–3	3–4	5–8	26–22
Chicago	1–5	0–6	3–4	—	2–11	5–8	3–3	3–10	3–3	8–5	1–6	1–5	4–2	2–4	3–3	21–27
Cleveland	4–2	4–3	2–4	11–2	—	8–5	4–2	8–5	3–3	9–4	3–3	2–4	5–2	2–4	3–3	20–28
Detroit	2–4	5–1	4–2	8–5	5–8	—	4–2	9–4	5–2	8–5	4–2	2–4	3–3	2–4	3–4	23–25
Houston	5–8	4–3	2–4	3–3	2–4	2–4	—	3–3	8–5	5–1	3-3	5–8	3–4	7–6	4–2	31–17
Kansas City	2–4	4–2	2–4	10–3	5–8	4–9	3–3	—	3–3	7–6	0–6	3–4	3–3	6-1	4–2	26–22
Los Angeles	9–4	1–5	5–1	3–3	3–3	2–5	5–8	3–3	—	2–4	3–4	4–9	3–3	5–8	2–4	22–26
Minnesota	3–4	6–0	3–3	5–8	4–9	5–8	1–5	6–7	4–2	—	2–4	3–4	3–3	3–3	2–4	20–28
New York	4–2	9–4	4–9	6–1	3–3	2–4	3–3	6–0	4–3	4–2	—	5–1	9–4	4–2	5–8	26–22
Seattle	7–6	1–5	3–3	5–1	4–2	4–2	8–5	4–3	9–4	4–3	1–5	—	3–3	10–3	2–4	25–23
Tampa Bay	3–3	6–7	3–10	2–4	2–5	3–3	4–3	3–3	3–3	3–3	4–9	3–3	—	3–3	7–6	28–20
Texas	8–5	4–2	4–3	4–2	4–2	4–2	6–7	1-6	8–5	3–3	2–4	3–10	3–3	—	2–4	25–23
Toronto	5–2	7–6	8–5	3–3	3–3	4–3	2–4	2–4	4–2	4–2	8–5	4–2	6–7	4–2	—	30–18

Updated with the results of all games through September 28, 2025.

==== Record vs. National League ====
2025 American League record vs. National League Source: MLB Standings
Team	AZ	ATL	CHC	CIN	COL	LAD	MIA	MIL	NYM	PHI	PIT	SD	SF	STL	WSH
Athletics	1–2	2–1	0–3	3–0	2–1	1–2	2–1	1–2	1–2	1–2	1–2	1–2	1–5	1–2	2–1
Baltimore	1–2	3–0	1–2	1–2	2–1	2–1	1–2	1–2	2–1	1–2	3–0	3–0	1–2	1–2	1–5
Boston	1–2	3–3	1–2	2–1	3–0	2–1	2–1	0–3	2–1	1–2	1–2	1–2	1–2	3–0	3–0
Chicago	1–2	1–2	1–5	2–1	2–1	0–3	2–1	1–2	1–2	2–1	3–0	1–2	2–1	0–3	2–1
Cleveland	1–2	0–3	0–3	1–5	2–1	1–2	2–1	2–1	3–0	1–2	3–0	0–3	2–1	0–3	2–1
Detroit	3–0	0–3	2–1	1–2	3–0	0–3	1–2	1–2	1–2	1–2	2–4	2–1	3–0	2–1	1–2
Houston	3–0	2–1	2–1	2–1	4–2	3–0	2–1	1–2	2–1	3–0	2–1	2–1	0–3	1–2	2–1
Kansas City	2–1	2–1	2–1	1–2	3–0	1–2	1–2	1–2	1–2	1–2	3–0	1–2	2–1	3–3	2–1
Los Angeles	2–1	2–1	0–3	1–2	1–2	6–0	1–2	0–3	0–3	2–1	1–2	1–2	2–1	2–1	1–2
Minnesota	1–2	0–3	2–1	1–2	1–2	1–2	1–2	2–4	2–1	1–2	2–1	2–1	3–0	0–3	1–2
New York	1–2	2–1	1–2	1–2	2–1	1–2	0–3	3–0	3–3	1–2	2–1	2–1	1–2	3–0	3–0
Seattle	0–3	2–1	2–1	2–1	3–0	0–3	2–1	1–2	1–2	0–3	3–0	5–1	0–3	3–0	1–2
Tampa Bay	2–1	2–1	1–2	0–3	2–1	1–2	3–3	2–1	3–0	0–3	2–1	3–0	2–1	2–1	3–0
Texas	2–4	3–0	1–2	2–1	3–0	1–2	0–3	3–0	2–1	0–3	2–1	1–2	1–2	2–1	2–1
Toronto	2–1	2–1	2–1	2–1	3–0	1–2	2–1	1–2	0–3	2–4	1–2	3–0	3–0	3–0	3–0

Updated with the results of all games through September 28, 2025.

== Game log ==
Legend
	Twins win
	Twins loss
	Postponement
	Eliminated from playoff spot
**Bold**	Twins team member

2025 game log: 70–92 (Home: 38–43; Away: 32–49)
March/April: 13–18 (Home: 9–6; Away: 4–12)

#	Date	Opponent	Score	Win	Loss	Save	Attendance	Record	Streak
1	March 27	@ Cardinals	3–5	Gray (1–0)	**López** (0–1)	Helsley (1)	47,395	0–1	L1
2	March 29	@ Cardinals	1–5	Fedde (1–0)	**Alcalá** (0–1)	—	30,712	0–2	L2
3	March 30	@ Cardinals	2–9	Pallante (1–0)	**Ober** (0–1)	Matz (1)	26,923	0–3	L3
4	March 31	@ White Sox	0–9	Pérez (1–0)	**Paddack** (0–1)	—	10,423	0–4	L4
5	April 1	@ White Sox	8–3	**Varland** (1–0)	Murfee (0–1)	—	12,089	1–4	W1
6	April 2	@ White Sox	6–1	**López** (1–1)	Burke (1–1)	—	10,193	2–4	W2
7	April 3	Astros	2–5	Brown (1–1)	**Ryan** (0–1)	Hader (3)	36,783	2–5	L1
8	April 5	Astros	6–1	**Sands** (1–0)	Arrighetti (1–1)	—	16,082	3–5	W1
9	April 6	Astros	7–9 (10)	Hader (1–0)	**Varland** (1–1)	—	14,638	3–6	L1
10	April 7	@ Royals	2–4	Lorenzen (1–1)	**Woods Richardson** (0–1)	Estévez (3)	12,041	3–7	L2
11	April 8	@ Royals	1–2	Schreiber (1–0)	**Jax** (0–1)	Lynch IV (1)	13,008	3–8	L3
12	April 9	@ Royals	4–0	**Ryan** (1–1)	Lugo (1–1)	—	13,156	4–8	W1
13	April 10	@ Royals	2–3	Lynch IV (2–0)	**Sands** (1–1)	Estévez (4)	14,730	4–9	L1
14	April 11	Tigers	6–7	Vest (1–0)	**Alcalá** (0–2)	Kahnle (2)	12,900	4–10	L2
15	April 12	Tigers	0–4	Jobe (1–0)	**Paddack** (0–2)	—	23,391	4–11	L3
16	April 13	Tigers	5–1	**Woods Richardson** (1–1)	Mize (2–1)	—	15,693	5–11	W1
17	April 14	Mets	1–5	Holmes (2–1)	**Topa** (0–1)	—	10,240	5–12	L1
18	April 15	Mets	6–3	**Ober** (1–1)	Megill (2–2)	**Durán** (1)	12,507	6–12	W1
19	April 16	Mets	4–3 (10)	**Sands** (2–1)	Garrett (0–1)	—	19,721	7–12	W2
20	April 18	@ Braves	4–6	De Los Santos (1–0)	**Jax** (0–2)	Iglesias (3)	39,142	7–13	L1
21	April 19	@ Braves	3–4	Johnson (1–0)	**Woods Richardson** (1–2)	Iglesias (4)	39,278	7–14	L2
22	April 20	@ Braves	2–6	Holmes (2–1)	**Ryan** (1–2)	—	31,889	7–15	L3
23	April 22	White Sox	4–2	**Ober** (2–1)	Martin (1–3)	**Durán** (2)	11,828	8–15	W1
24	April 23	White Sox	6–3	**Topa** (1–1)	Leasure (0–1)	**Coulombe** (1)	12,407	9–15	W2
25	April 24	White Sox	0–3 (7)	Smith (1–1)	**Paddack** (0–3)	Eisert (1)	12,414	9–16	L1
26	April 25	Angels	11–4	**López** (2–1)	Hendricks (0–3)	—	14,332	10–16	W1
27	April 26	Angels	5–1	**Woods Richardson** (2–2)	Kikuchi (0–4)	—	23,905	11–16	W2
28	April 27	Angels	5–0	**Ryan** (2–2)	Soriano (2–4)	—	18,615	12–16	W3
29	April 28	@ Guardians	11–1	**Ober** (3–1)	Williams (2–2)	—	15,018	13–16	W4
30	April 29	@ Guardians	1–2	Clase (4–0)	**Varland** (1–2)	—	14,312	13–17	L1
31	April 30	@ Guardians	2–4	Smith (1–0)	**López** (2–2)	Clase (5)	15,523	13–18	L2

May: 18–8 (Home: 9–2; Away: 9–6)

#	Date	Opponent	Score	Win	Loss	Save	Attendance	Record	Streak
32	May 1	@ Guardians	3–4 (10)	Allard (1–0)	**Topa** (1–2)	—	15,968	13–19	L3
33	May 2	@ Red Sox	1–6	Wilson (1–0)	**Varland** (1–3)	—	35,914	13–20	L4
34	May 3	@ Red Sox	4–3	**Ober** (4–1)	Dobbins (2–1)	**Durán** (3)	36,250	14–20	W1
35	May 4	@ Red Sox	5–4	**Varland** (2–3)	Slaten (0–3)	**Durán** (4)	33,539	15–20	W2
36	May 6	Orioles	9–1	**López** (3–2)	Povich (1–3)	—	19,779	16–20	W3
37	May 7	Orioles	5–2	**Coulombe** (1–0)	Morton (0–7)	**Durán** (5)	16,417	17–20	W4
38	May 8	Orioles	5–2	**Jax** (1–2)	Canó (0–2)	**Durán** (6)	17,410	18–20	W5
39	May 9	Giants	3–1	**Paddack** (1–3)	Hicks (1–4)	**Coulombe** (2)	21,744	19–20	W6
40	May 10	Giants	2–1	**Ryan** (3–2)	Webb (4–3)	**Durán** (7)	23,813	20–20	W7
41	May 11	Giants	7–6 (10)	**Durán** (1–0)	Walker (1–2)	—	23,551	21–20	W8
―	May 13	@ Orioles	Postponed (rain); Makeup: May 14						
42	May 14 (1)	@ Orioles	6–3	**Stewart** (1–0)	Kremer (3–5)	**Durán** (8)	see 2nd game	22–20	W9
43	May 14 (2)	@ Orioles	8–6	**Funderburk** (1–0)	Canó (0–3)	**Sands** (1)	10,169	23–20	W10
44	May 15	@ Orioles	4–0	**Paddack** (2–3)	Sugano (4–3)	—	30,926	24–20	W11
45	May 16	@ Brewers	3–0	**Ryan** (4–2)	Patrick (2–4)	**Sands** (2)	33,070	25–20	W12
46	May 17	@ Brewers	7–0	**López** (4–2)	Myers (1–1)	—	40,267	26–20	W13
47	May 18	@ Brewers	2–5	Peralta (5–3)	**Matthews** (0–1)	Megill (6)	30,018	26–21	L1
48	May 19	Guardians	6–5 (Note: The May 19 game was suspended due to rain in the top of the fourth inning with the Twins leading 2–1; it was completed before the regularly scheduled game on May 21.)	**Durán** (2–0)	Smith (1–2)	—	see 2nd game	27–21	W1
―	May 20	Guardians	Postponed (rain); Makeup: Sept 20						
49	May 21	Guardians	1–5	Williams (4–2)	**Paddack** (2–4)	—	26,142	27–22	L1
50	May 23	Royals	3–1	**Sands** (3–1)	Erceg (1–1)	—	22,391	28–22	W1
51	May 24	Royals	5–4	**Durán** (3–0)	Lynch IV (3–1)	—	30,720	29–22	W2
52	May 25	Royals	1–2 (10)	Estévez (2–0)	**Durán** (3–1)	Clarke (1)	32,501	29–23	L1
53	May 26	@ Rays	2–7	Littell (4–5)	**Paddack** (2–5)	—	8,759	29–24	L2
54	May 27	@ Rays	4–2	**Ryan** (5–2)	Bradley (4–4)	**Durán** (9)	10,046	30–24	W1
55	May 28	@ Rays	0–5	Rasmussen (4–4)	**López** (4–3)	—	8,372	30–25	L1
56	May 30	@ Mariners	12–6 (10)	**Durán** (4–1)	Legumina (4–3)	—	39,614	31–25	W1
57	May 31	@ Mariners	4–5 (11)	Snider (2–1)	**Sands** (3–2)	—	37,457	31–26	L1

June: 9–18 (Home: 4–9; Away: 5–9)

#	Date	Opponent	Score	Win	Loss	Save	Attendance	Record	Streak
58	June 1	@ Mariners	1–2	Muñoz (2–0)	**Jax** (1–3)	—	39,003	31–27	L2
59	June 2	@ Athletics	10–4	**Ryan** (6–2)	Severino (1–5)	—	8,922	32–27	W1
60	June 3	@ Athletics	10–3	**López** (5–3)	Lopez (0–3)	—	8,487	33–27	W2
61	June 4	@ Athletics	6–1	**Matthews** (1–1)	Sterner (1–3)	—	9,211	34–27	W3
62	June 5	@ Athletics	3–14	Spence (2–1)	**Festa** (0–1)	—	8,877	34–28	L1
63	June 6	Blue Jays	4–6	Lauer (2–1)	**Ober** (4–2)	Hoffman (14)	26,847	34–29	L2
64	June 7	Blue Jays	4–5	Green (2–1)	**Jax** (1–4)	Hoffman (15)	23,476	34–30	L3
65	June 8	Blue Jays	6–3	**Ryan** (7–2)	Francis (2–8)	**Durán** (10)	22,078	35–30	W1
66	June 10	Rangers	4–16	Mahle (6–3)	**Woods Richardson** (2–3)	—	24,765	35–31	L1
67	June 11	Rangers	6–2	**Festa** (1–1)	Leiter (4–3)	—	18,904	36–31	W1
68	June 12	Rangers	3–16	Corbin (4–5)	**Ober** (4–3)	—	23,995	36–32	L1
69	June 13	@ Astros	3–10	Gordon (2–1)	**Paddack** (2–6)	—	38,402	36–33	L2
70	June 14	@ Astros	2–3	Hader (3–0)	**Durán** (4–2)	—	36,315	36–34	L3
71	June 15	@ Astros	1–2 (10)	Hader (4–0)	**Sands** (3–3)	—	39,757	36–35	L4
72	June 17	@ Reds	5–6	Barlow (2–0)	**Stewart** (1–1)	Pagán (17)	26,153	36–36	L5
73	June 18	@ Reds	2–4 (6)	Lodolo (5–5)	**Ober** (4–4)	—	25,911	36–37	L6
74	June 19	@ Reds	12–5	**Paddack** (3–6)	Martinez (4–8)	—	27,306	37–37	W1
75	June 20	Brewers	6–17	Misiorowski (2–0)	**Ryan** (7–3)	—	28,011	37–38	L1
76	June 21	Brewers	0–9	Quintana (5–2)	**Woods Richardson** (2–4)	—	28,321	37–39	L2
77	June 22	Brewers	8–9	Zastryzny (2–1)	**Festa** (1–2)	Megill (17)	21,143	37–40	L3
78	June 23	Mariners	2–11	Woo (7–4)	**Ober** (4–5)	—	17,909	37–41	L4
79	June 24	Mariners	5–6	Muñoz (3–0)	**Durán** (4–3)	Brash (1)	23,532	37–42	L5
80	June 25	Mariners	2–0	**Ryan** (8–3)	Kirby (1–4)	**Durán** (11)	15,850	38–42	W1
81	June 26	Mariners	10–1	**Woods Richardson** (3–4)	Hancock (3–4)	—	19,666	39–42	W2
82	June 27	@ Tigers	4–1	**Festa** (2–2)	Gipson-Long (0–1)	**Durán** (12)	32,120	40–42	W3
83	June 28	@ Tigers	5–10	Mize (8–2)	**Ober** (4–6)	—	33,780	40–43	L1
84	June 29	@ Tigers	0–3	Skubal (10–2)	**Paddack** (3–7)	Vest (13)	40,718	40–44	L2

July: 11–13 (Home: 8–7; Away: 3–6)

#	Date	Opponent	Score	Win	Loss	Save	Attendance	Record	Streak
85	July 1	@ Marlins	0–2	Cabrera (3–2)	**Ryan** (8–4)	Henríquez (4)	7,860	40–45	L3
86	July 2	@ Marlins	2–1	**Woods Richardson** (4–4)	Junk (2–1)	**Durán** (13)	7,596	41–45	W1
87	July 3	@ Marlins	1–4	Pérez (1–2)	**Festa** (2–3)	Henríquez (5)	9,690	41–46	L1
88	July 4	Rays	4–3	**Varland** (3–3)	Kelly (0–1)	—	24,197	42–46	W1
89	July 5	Rays	6–5	**Durán** (5–3)	Cleavinger (0–4)	—	17,679	43–46	W2
90	July 6	Rays	5–7 (10)	Fairbanks (4–2)	**Topa** (1–3)	Orze (3)	21,294	43–47	L1
91	July 8	Cubs	8–1	**Woods Richardson** (5–4)	Imanaga (5–3)	—	30,384	44–47	W1
92	July 9	Cubs	4–2	**Festa** (3–3)	Horton (3–3)	**Durán** (14)	33,470	45–47	W2
93	July 10	Cubs	1–8	Rea (7–3)	**Paddack** (3–8)	—	34,391	45–48	L1
94	July 11	Pirates	2–1	**Ryan** (9–4)	Skenes (4–8)	**Durán** (15)	40,100	46–48	W1
95	July 12	Pirates	12–4	**Adams** (1–0)	Burrows (1–3)	—	26,496	47–48	W2
96	July 13	Pirates	1–2	Santana (3–2)	**Durán** (5–4)	Bednar (13)	24,959	47–49	L1
ASG	July 15	AL @ NL	–					—	N/A
97	July 18	@ Rockies	4–6	Freeland (2–10)	**Paddack** (3–9)	Halvorsen (9)	37,759	47–50	L2
98	July 19	@ Rockies	6–10	Senzatela (4–13)	**Matthews** (1–2)	—	42,131	47–51	L3
99	July 20	@ Rockies	7–1	**Ryan** (10–4)	Márquez (3–11)	—	27,796	48–51	W1
100	July 21	@ Dodgers	2–5	May (6–6)	**Festa** (3–4)	Yates (3)	51,121	48–52	L1
101	July 22	@ Dodgers	10–7	**Stewart** (2–1)	Casparius (7–4)	—	45,074	49–52	W1
102	July 23	@ Dodgers	3–4	Banda (5–1)	**Jax** (1–5)	—	40,094	49–53	L1
103	July 25	Nationals	1–0	**Matthews** (2–2)	Gore (4–10)	**Durán** (16)	27,736	50–53	W1
104	July 26	Nationals	3–9	Parker (7–10)	**Ryan** (10–5)	—	26,928	50–54	L1
105	July 27	Nationals	2–7	Irvin (8–5)	**Adams** (1–1)	—	20,374	50–55	L2
106	July 28	Red Sox	5–4	**Durán** (6–4)	Hicks (1–7)	—	24,443	51–55	W1
107	July 29	Red Sox	5–8	Giolito (7–2)	**Ohl** (0–1)	Chapman (19)	27,460	51–56	L1
108	July 30	Red Sox	1–13	Bello (7–5)	**Matthews** (2–3)	—	29,146	51–57	L2

August: 11–17 (Home: 5–8; Away: 6–9)

#	Date	Opponent	Score	Win	Loss	Save	Attendance	Record	Streak
109	August 1	@ Guardians	2–3 (10)	Smith (3–4)	**Funderburk** (1–1)	—	32,777	51–58	L3
110	August 2	@ Guardians	4–5	Enright (2–0)	**Ohl** (0–2)	Gaddis (1)	35,116	51–59	L4
111	August 3	@ Guardians	5–4	**Funderburk** (2–1)	Cantillo (2–2)	**Ramírez** (1)	29,240	52–59	W1
112	August 4	@ Tigers	3–6	Mize (10–4)	**Davis** (0–2)	Finnegan (22)	24,018	52–60	L1
113	August 5	@ Tigers	6–3	**Matthews** (3–3)	Paddack (4–10)	**Topa** (1)	26,313	53–60	W1
114	August 6	@ Tigers	9–4	**Hatch** (1–0)	Flaherty (6–11)	—	29,192	54–60	W2
115	August 8	Royals	9–4	**Ryan** (11–5)	Lugo (8–6)	—	28,242	55–60	W3
116	August 9	Royals	0–2	Cameron (6–5)	**Ober** (4–7)	Estévez (29)	22,539	55–61	L1
117	August 10	Royals	5–3 (11)	**Tonkin** (1–0)	Estévez (4–4)	—	26,746	56–61	W1
118	August 11	@ Yankees	2–6	Warren (7–5)	**Matthews** (3–4)	—	36,744	56–62	L1
119	August 12	@ Yankees	1–9	Rodón (12–7)	**Adams** (1–2)	—	37,552	56–63	L2
120	August 13	@ Yankees	4–1	**Ryan** (12–5)	De Los Santos (0–1)	**Topa** (2)	44,466	57–63	W1
121	August 14	Tigers	3–4 (11)	Montero (1–1)	**Ramírez** (0–1)	—	24,123	57–64	L1
122	August 15	Tigers	0–7	Morton (8–10)	**Ohl** (0–3)	—	27,282	57–65	L2
123	August 16	Tigers	5–8	Mize (12–4)	**Kriske** (0–1)	Finnegan (24)	19,537	57–66	L3
124	August 17	Tigers	8–1	**Hatch** (2–0)	Paddack (4–11)	—	22,230	58–66	W1
125	August 19	Athletics	3–6	Lopez (7–6)	**Ryan** (12–6)	Harris (1)	22,725	58–67	L1
126	August 20	Athletics	2–4 (10)	Kelly (3–2)	**Cabrera** (0–1)	Ferguson (2)	18,448	58–68	L2
127	August 21	Athletics	3–8	Perkins (3–2)	**Ureña** (0–1)	Bido (1)	21,837	58–69	L3
128	August 22	@ White Sox	9–7	**Funderburk** (3–1)	Eisert (2–5)	**Topa** (3)	22,372	59–69	W1
129	August 23	@ White Sox	3–7	Martin (5–9)	**Abel** (2–3)	—	16,998	59–70	L1
130	August 24	@ White Sox	0–8	Eisert (3–5)	**Bradley** (6–7)	—	18,723	59–71	L2
131	August 25	@ Blue Jays	4–10	Scherzer (5–2)	**Ryan** (12–7)	—	41,845	59–72	L3
132	August 26	@ Blue Jays	7–5	**Tonkin** (2–0)	Hoffman (8–5)	**Topa** (4)	42,235	60–72	W1
133	August 27	@ Blue Jays	8–9	Domínguez (3–4)	**Tonkin** (2–1)	Hoffman (29)	42,361	60–73	L1
134	August 29	Padres	7–4	**Matthews** (4–4)	Cortés Jr. (2–3)	**Funderburk** (1)	24,336	61–73	W1
135	August 30	Padres	3–12	Morejón (11–4)	**Abel** (2–4)	—	23,971	61–74	L1
136	August 31	Padres	7–2	**Ryan** (13–7)	Hart (3–3)	—	26,956	62–74	W1

September: 8–18 (Home: 3–11; Away: 5–7)

#	Date	Opponent	Score	Win	Loss	Save	Attendance	Record	Streak
137	September 1	White Sox	5–6	Alexander (5–13)	**Topa** (1–4)	Leasure (5)	15,892	62–75	L1
138	September 2	White Sox	3–12	Martin (6–9)	**Hatch** (2–1)	—	11,721	62–76	L2
139	September 3	White Sox	3–4	Taylor (1–4)	**Topa** (1–5)	Leasure (6)	11,904	62–77	L3
140	September 4	White Sox	8–11	González (1–0)	**Adams** (1–3)	—	13,188	62–78	L4
141	September 5	@ Royals	1–2	Wacha (9–11)	**López** (5–4)	Estévez (38)	16,255	62–79	L5
142	September 6	@ Royals	2–11	Kolek (5–5)	**Ryan** (13–8)	—	21,771	62–80	L6
143	September 7	@ Royals	5–1	**Ober** (5–7)	Lorenzen (5–10)	**Cabrera** (1)	26,505	63–80	W1
144	September 8	@ Angels	12–3	**Woods Richardson** (6–4)	Dana (0–1)	—	28,824	64–80	W2
145	September 9	@ Angels	2–12	Hendricks (7–9)	**Matthews** (4–5)	—	29,694	64–81	L1
146	September 10	@ Angels	3–4	Stephenson (2–0)	**Sands** (3–4)	Jansen (27)	20,746	64–82	L2
147	September 12	Diamondbacks	9–8	**Sands** (4–4)	Woodford (0–4)	—	18,177	65–82	W1
148	September 13	Diamondbacks	2–5 (10)	Curtiss (3–1)	**Sands** (4–5)	—	21,227	65–83	L1
149	September 14	Diamondbacks	4–6	Crismatt (3–0)	**Ober** (5–8)	Backhus (2)	18,376	65–84	L2
150	September 15	Yankees	7–0	**Woods Richardson** (7–4)	Rodón (16–9)	—	22,001	66–84	W1
151	September 16	Yankees	9–10	Leiter Jr. (6–7)	**Matthews** (4–6)	Bednar (25)	25,500	66–85	L1
152	September 17	Yankees	5–10	Cruz (3–4)	**Bradley** (6–8)	—	20,206	66–86	L2
153	September 19	Guardians	2–6	Junis (4–1)	**Sands** (4–6)	—	20,159	66–87	L3
154	September 20 (1)	Guardians	0–6	Cecconi (7–6)	**Ryan** (13–9)	—	22,160	66–88	L4
155	September 20 (2)	Guardians	0–8	Allen (8–11)	**Ober** (5–9)	—	23,242	66–89	L5
156	September 21	Guardians	6–2	**Funderburk** (4–1)	Festa (5–4)	—	22,526	67–89	W1
157	September 23	@ Rangers	4–1	**Matthews** (5–6)	Corbin (7–11)	**Sands** (3)	24,674	68–89	W2
158	September 24	@ Rangers	2–4	Garcia (4–7)	**Adams** (1–4)	Maton (5)	24,622	68–90	L1
159	September 25	@ Rangers	4–0	**Ober** (6–9)	Mahle (6–4)	—	23,298	69–90	W1
160	September 26	@ Phillies	1–3	Nola (5–10)	**Ryan** (13–10)	Durán (32)	40,073	69–91	L1
161	September 27	@ Phillies	5–0	**Abel** (3–5)	Suárez (12–8)	—	40,506	70–91	W1
162	September 28	@ Phillies	1–2 (10)	Kerkering (8–4)	**Laweryson** (0–1)	—	42,637	70–92	L1

== Roster ==
2025 Minnesota Twins
Roster
Pitchers: 20 Mick Abel; 45 Travis Adams; 66 Jorge Alcalá; 60 Scott Blewett; 26 Taj Bradley; 92 Génesis Cabrera; 54 Danny Coulombe; 63 Noah Davis; 68 Randy Dobnak; 59 Jhoan Durán; 58 David Festa; 55 Kody Funderburk; 56 Thomas Hatch; 22 Griffin Jax; 61 Brooks Kriske; 66 Cody Laweryson; 49 Pablo López; 52 Zebby Matthews; 51 Darren McCaughan; 57 Anthony Misiewicz; 17 Bailey Ober; 62 Pierson Ohl; 20 Chris Paddack; 30 Erasmo Ramírez; 41 Joe Ryan; 44 Cole Sands; 61 Brock Stewart; 39 Michael Tonkin; 48 Justin Topa; 54 José Ureña; 37 Louie Varland; 63 Joey Wentz; 24 Simeon Woods Richardson	Catchers: 11 Mickey Gasper; 27 Ryan Jeffers; 65 Jhonny Pereda; 8 Christian Vázquez; Infielders: 31 Jonah Bride; 18 Kody Clemens; 4 Carlos Correa; 53 Ryan Fitzgerald; 13 Ty France; 47 Edouard Julien; 15 Luke Keaschall; 2 Brooks Lee; 23 Royce Lewis; 64 José Miranda	Outfielders: 12 Harrison Bader; 25 Byron Buxton; 50 Willi Castro; 21 DaShawn Keirsey Jr.; 9 Trevor Larnach; 16 Austin Martin; 60 Carson McCusker; 43 James Outman; 19 Alan Roden; 38 Matt Wallner	Manager: 5 Rocco Baldelli; Coaches: 67 Trevor Amicone (assistant hitting); 72 Matt Borgschulte (hitting); 46 Ramon Borrego (first base); 35 Hank Conger (assistant bench); 75 Nate Dammann (quality control); 98 Anderson De La Rosa (bullpen catcher); 88 Pete Maki (pitching); 98 Connor Olson (bullpen catcher); 91 Luis Ramirez (assistant pitching); 79 Rayden Sierra (assistant hitting); 84 Colby Suggs (bullpen); 33 Jayce Tingler (bench); 40 Tommy Watkins (third base)

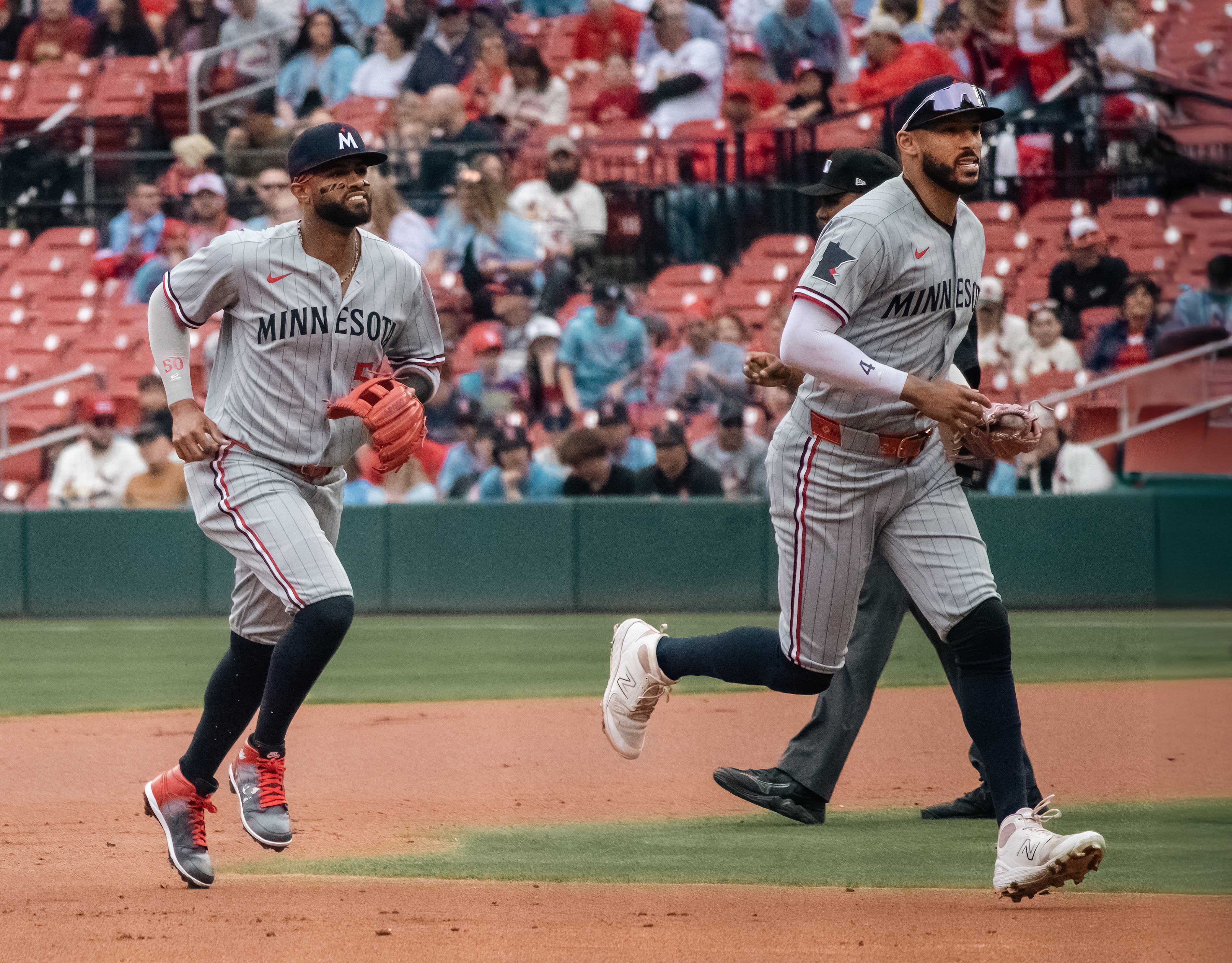
Castro and Correa

== Player stats ==
= Indicates team leader

=== Batting ===
Note: G = Games played; AB = At bats; R = Runs scored; H = Hits; 2B = Doubles; 3B = Triples; HR = Home runs; RBI = Runs batted in; SB = Stolen bases; BB = Walks; AVG = Batting average; SLG = Slugging average

Player	G	AB	R	H	2B	3B	HR	RBI	SB	BB	AVG	SLG
Trevor Larnach	142	503	62	126	24	1	17	60	4	53	.250	.404
Byron Buxton	126	488	97	129	21	7	35	83	24	41	.264	.551
Brooks Lee	139	487	50	115	15	1	16	64	3	31	.236	.370
Ryan Jeffers	119	406	47	108	26	0	9	47	1	50	.266	.397
Royce Lewis	106	376	36	89	18	0	13	52	12	25	.237	.388
Ty France	101	350	41	88	19	0	6	44	1	19	.251	.357
Kody Clemens	112	342	46	74	12	4	19	52	5	28	.216	.442
Carlos Correa	93	337	40	90	19	0	7	31	0	26	.267	.386
Matt Wallner	104	336	47	68	16	3	22	40	4	46	.202	.464
Willi Castro	86	302	48	74	15	2	10	27	9	32	.245	.407
Harrison Bader	96	271	31	70	13	0	12	38	10	27	.258	.439
Christian Vázquez	65	190	14	36	7	0	3	14	1	18	.189	.274
Edouard Julien	64	182	13	40	10	0	3	12	0	22	.220	.324
Luke Keaschall	49	182	25	55	14	0	4	28	14	19	.302	.445
Austin Martin	50	156	22	44	8	1	1	7	11	22	.282	.365
Mickey Gasper	45	95	15	15	1	0	2	11	2	10	.158	.232
James Outman	37	95	11	14	4	1	4	7	1	8	.147	.337
DaShawn Keirsey Jr.	74	84	11	9	0	0	2	6	10	2	.107	.179
Jonah Bride	33	72	4	15	2	0	0	3	0	6	.208	.236
Ryan Fitzgerald	24	46	10	9	0	0	4	9	1	7	.196	.457
Alan Roden	12	38	5	6	1	0	1	1	1	0	.158	.263
José Miranda	12	36	2	6	0	0	1	5	0	0	.167	.250
Carson McCusker	16	29	0	5	0	0	0	1	0	1	.172	.172
Jhonny Pereda	11	29	1	10	4	0	0	1	0	2	.345	.483
Totals	162	5432	678	1295	249	20	191	643	114	495	.238	.397

Source:Baseball Reference

=== Pitching ===
Note: W = Wins; L = Losses; ERA = Earned run average; G = Games pitched; GS = Games started; SV = Saves; IP = Innings pitched; H = Hits allowed; R = Runs allowed; ER = Earned runs allowed; BB = Walks allowed; SO = Strikeouts

Player	W	L	ERA	G	GS	SV	IP	H	R	ER	BB	SO
Joe Ryan	13	10	3.42	31	30	0	171.0	138	69	65	39	194
Bailey Ober	6	9	5.10	27	27	0	146.1	159	84	83	31	120
Simeon Woods Richardson	7	4	4.04	23	22	0	111.1	96	53	50	46	107
Chris Paddack	3	9	4.95	21	21	0	111.0	115	65	61	27	83
Zebby Matthews	5	6	5.56	16	16	0	79.1	94	50	49	24	88
Pablo López	5	4	2.74	14	14	0	75.2	64	28	23	20	73
Cole Sands	4	6	4.50	69	3	3	72.0	65	41	36	19	64
Justin Topa	1	5	3.90	54	1	4	60.0	68	32	26	18	49
David Festa	3	4	5.40	11	10	0	53.1	49	35	32	19	53
Jhoan Durán	6	4	2.01	49	0	16	49.1	40	13	11	18	53
Louis Varland	3	3	2.02	51	0	0	49.0	41	14	11	13	47
Griffin Jax	1	5	4.50	50	0	0	46.0	46	24	23	13	72
Kody Funderburk	4	1	3.51	39	0	1	41.0	44	17	16	18	40
Brock Stewart	2	1	2.38	39	0	0	34.0	26	9	9	11	41
Travis Adams	1	4	7.49	18	2	0	33.2	39	29	28	17	31
Thomas Hatch	2	1	5.45	11	1	0	33.0	38	21	20	17	21
Taj Bradley	0	2	6.61	6	6	0	31.1	32	23	23	12	32
Danny Coulombe	1	0	1.16	40	1	2	31.0	21	4	4	9	31
Pierson Ohl	0	3	5.10	14	3	0	30.0	38	22	17	7	27
Jorge Alcalá	0	2	8.88	22	0	0	24.1	29	25	24	15	28
Michael Tonkin	2	1	4.88	21	0	0	24.0	20	13	13	8	19
José Ureña	0	1	4.58	4	3	0	17.2	17	9	9	8	10
Génesis Cabrera	0	1	7.98	16	0	1	14.2	17	14	13	11	13
Mick Abel	1	2	8.36	4	2	0	14.0	18	14	13	7	18
Brooks Kriske	0	1	11.25	12	0	0	12.0	18	15	15	10	14
Erasmo Ramírez	0	1	2.45	9	0	0	11.0	10	4	3	2	5
Joey Wentz	0	0	15.75	6	0	0	8.0	17	14	14	9	6
Cody Laweryson	0	1	1.17	5	0	0	7.2	4	2	1	0	7
Jonah Bride	0	0	15.00	4	0	0	6.0	14	10	10	3	2
Darren McCaughan	0	0	1.69	3	0	0	5.1	5	1	1	1	6
Randy Dobnak	0	0	1.69	1	0	0	5.1	2	1	1	2	1
Noah Davis	0	1	16.20	4	0	0	5.0	12	10	9	1	7
Scott Blewett	0	0	1.93	2	0	0	4.2	4	1	1	0	5
Anthony Misiewicz	0	0	9.64	5	0	0	4.2	5	5	5	4	5
Ryan Fitzgerald	0	0	0.00	2	0	0	2.0	2	0	0	0	0
Willi Castro	0	0	0.00	1	0	0	1.0	1	0	0	0	0
Kody Clemens	0	0	18.00	1	0	0	1.0	3	2	2	0	0
Totals	70	92	4.55	162	162	28	1426.2	1411	773	721	459	1372

Source:Baseball Reference

== Farm system ==
On January 21, 2025, the Twins announced their minor league coaching staffs for the 2025 season.

Level	Team	League	Manager
AAA	St. Paul Saints	International League	Toby Gardenhire
AA	Wichita Wind Surge	Texas League	Brian Dinkelman
A-Advanced	Cedar Rapids Kernels	Midwest League	Brian Meyer
A	Fort Myers Mighty Mussels	Florida State League	Seth Feldman
Rookie	FCL Twins	Florida Complex League	Nico Giarratano
Rookie	DSL Twins	Dominican Summer League	Rafael Martinez
