= 2023 Minnesota Twins season =

2023 Minnesota Twins
- American League Central champions
- League: American League
- Division: Central
- Ballpark: Target Field
- City: Minneapolis, Minnesota
- Record: 87–75 (.537)
- Divisional place: 1st
- Owners: Jim Pohlad
- President: Dave St. Peter
- President of baseball operations: Derek Falvey
- General manager: Thad Levine
- Managers: Rocco Baldelli
- Television: Bally Sports North
- Radio: WCCO
- Stats: ESPN.com; Baseball Reference

The 2023 Minnesota Twins season was the 63rd season for the Minnesota Twins franchise in the Twin Cities of Minnesota, their 14th season at Target Field, and the 123rd overall in the American League. The Twins drew an average home attendance of 24,371 in 81 home games in the 2023 MLB season. The total attendance was 1,974,124.

With a shutout win over the Chicago White Sox on September 17, the Twins improved on their 78–84 record from the 2022 season. After a 8–6 victory over the Los Angeles Angels on September 22, the Twins clinched their first American League Central title and playoff appearance since the 2020 season. They defeated the Toronto Blue Jays in two games in the American League Wild Card Series. Their game 1 victory was their first playoff win since 2004, snapping an 18-game playoff losing streak. Their series victory was their first since 2002. However, they were defeated by the Houston Astros in the American League Division Series in four games.

== Offseason ==
=== Rule changes ===
Pursuant to the CBA, new rule changes were in place with the start of the 2023 season:

- institution of a pitch clock between pitches;
- limits on pickoff attempts per plate appearance;
- limits on defensive shifts requiring two infielders to be on either side of second and be within the boundary of the infield; and
- larger bases (increased to 18-inch squares);

=== New uniforms ===
On November 18, 2022, the team unveiled its first complete uniform redesign since 1987. Along with the 4 brand new uniform designs, the team unveiled an altered "TC" logo and an "M" logo featuring a red North Star.

== Season standings ==
=== American League Central ===
AL Central
| Team | W | L | Pct. | GB | Home | Road |
|---|---|---|---|---|---|---|
| Minnesota Twins | 87 | 75 | .537 | — | 47‍–‍34 | 40‍–‍41 |
| Detroit Tigers | 78 | 84 | .481 | 9 | 37‍–‍44 | 41‍–‍40 |
| Cleveland Guardians | 76 | 86 | .469 | 11 | 42‍–‍39 | 34‍–‍47 |
| Chicago White Sox | 61 | 101 | .377 | 26 | 31‍–‍50 | 30‍–‍51 |
| Kansas City Royals | 56 | 106 | .346 | 31 | 33‍–‍48 | 23‍–‍58 |

=== American League Wild Card teams ===
Division leaders
| Team | W | L | Pct. |
|---|---|---|---|
| Baltimore Orioles | 101 | 61 | .623 |
| Houston Astros | 90 | 72 | .556 |
| Minnesota Twins | 87 | 75 | .537 |

Wild Card teams (Top 3 teams qualify for postseason)
| Team | W | L | Pct. | GB |
|---|---|---|---|---|
| Tampa Bay Rays | 99 | 63 | .611 | +10 |
| Texas Rangers | 90 | 72 | .556 | +1 |
| Toronto Blue Jays | 89 | 73 | .549 | — |
| Seattle Mariners | 88 | 74 | .543 | 1 |
| New York Yankees | 82 | 80 | .506 | 7 |
| Boston Red Sox | 78 | 84 | .481 | 11 |
| Detroit Tigers | 78 | 84 | .481 | 11 |
| Cleveland Guardians | 76 | 86 | .469 | 13 |
| Los Angeles Angels | 73 | 89 | .451 | 16 |
| Chicago White Sox | 61 | 101 | .377 | 28 |
| Kansas City Royals | 56 | 106 | .346 | 33 |
| Oakland Athletics | 50 | 112 | .309 | 39 |

=== Record vs. opponents ===
==== Record vs. American League ====
2023 American League record Source: MLB Standings Grid – 2023
| Team | BAL | BOS | CWS | CLE | DET | HOU | KC | LAA | MIN | NYY | OAK | SEA | TB | TEX | TOR | NL |
|---|---|---|---|---|---|---|---|---|---|---|---|---|---|---|---|---|
| Baltimore | — | 7–6 | 4–2 | 3–4 | 6–1 | 3–3 | 5–1 | 5–2 | 4–2 | 7–6 | 6–1 | 4–2 | 8–5 | 3–3 | 10–3 | 26–20 |
| Boston | 6–7 | — | 2–4 | 3–3 | 5–1 | 2–5 | 5–2 | 3–4 | 4–3 | 9–4 | 4–2 | 3–3 | 2–11 | 3–3 | 7–6 | 20–26 |
| Chicago | 2–4 | 4–2 | — | 8–5 | 5–8 | 3–4 | 6–7 | 3–4 | 4–9 | 4–2 | 3–4 | 2–4 | 1–6 | 1–5 | 0–6 | 15–31 |
| Cleveland | 4–3 | 3–3 | 5–8 | — | 4–9 | 2–4 | 7–6 | 3–4 | 7–6 | 2–4 | 5–1 | 4–3 | 3–3 | 3–3 | 4–3 | 20–26 |
| Detroit | 1–6 | 1–5 | 8–5 | 9–4 | — | 3–3 | 10–3 | 3–3 | 8–5 | 2–5 | 3–4 | 3–3 | 1–5 | 3–4 | 2–4 | 21–25 |
| Houston | 3–3 | 5–2 | 4–3 | 4–2 | 3–3 | — | 1–5 | 9–4 | 2–4 | 2–5 | 10–3 | 4–9 | 3–3 | 9–4 | 3–4 | 28–18 |
| Kansas City | 1–5 | 2–5 | 7–6 | 6–7 | 3–10 | 5–1 | — | 2–4 | 4–9 | 2–4 | 2–4 | 1–6 | 3–4 | 1–5 | 1–6 | 16–30 |
| Los Angeles | 2–5 | 4–3 | 4–3 | 4–3 | 3–3 | 4–9 | 4–2 | — | 3–3 | 4–2 | 7–6 | 5–8 | 2–4 | 6–7 | 2–4 | 19–27 |
| Minnesota | 2–4 | 3–4 | 9–4 | 6–7 | 5–8 | 4–2 | 9–4 | 3–3 | — | 4–3 | 5–1 | 3–4 | 1–5 | 5–2 | 3–3 | 25–21 |
| New York | 6–7 | 4–9 | 2–4 | 4–2 | 5–2 | 5–2 | 4–2 | 2–4 | 3–4 | — | 5–1 | 4–2 | 5–8 | 3–4 | 7–6 | 23–23 |
| Oakland | 1–6 | 2–4 | 4–3 | 1–5 | 4–3 | 3–10 | 4–2 | 6–7 | 1–5 | 1–5 | — | 1–12 | 2–5 | 4–9 | 2–4 | 14–32 |
| Seattle | 2–4 | 3–3 | 4–2 | 3–4 | 3–3 | 9–4 | 6–1 | 8–5 | 4–3 | 2–4 | 12–1 | — | 3–4 | 4–9 | 3–3 | 22–24 |
| Tampa Bay | 5–8 | 11–2 | 6–1 | 3–3 | 5–1 | 3–3 | 4–3 | 4–2 | 5–1 | 8–5 | 5–2 | 4–3 | — | 2–4 | 7–6 | 27–19 |
| Texas | 3–3 | 3–3 | 5–1 | 3–3 | 4–3 | 4–9 | 5–1 | 7–6 | 2–5 | 4–3 | 9–4 | 9–4 | 4–2 | — | 6–1 | 22–24 |
| Toronto | 3–10 | 6–7 | 6–0 | 3–4 | 4–2 | 4–3 | 6–1 | 4–2 | 3–3 | 6–7 | 4–2 | 3–3 | 6–7 | 1–6 | — | 30–16 |

Updated with the results of all games through October 1, 2023.

==== Record vs. National League ====
2023 American League record vs. National League Source: MLB Standings
| Team | ARI | ATL | CHC | CIN | COL | LAD | MIA | MIL | NYM | PHI | PIT | SD | SF | STL | WSH |
|---|---|---|---|---|---|---|---|---|---|---|---|---|---|---|---|
| Baltimore | 2–1 | 1–2 | 1–2 | 1–2 | 2–1 | 1–2 | 3–0 | 1–2 | 3–0 | 1–2 | 2–1 | 1–2 | 2–1 | 1–2 | 4–0 |
| Boston | 2–1 | 3–1 | 2–1 | 1–2 | 1–2 | 1–2 | 0–3 | 2–1 | 2–1 | 2–1 | 0–3 | 2–1 | 1–2 | 0–3 | 1–2 |
| Chicago | 1–2 | 2–1 | 1–3 | 2–1 | 1–2 | 1–2 | 1–2 | 0–3 | 1–2 | 1–2 | 1–2 | 0–3 | 1–2 | 1–2 | 1–2 |
| Cleveland | 1–2 | 1–2 | 2–1 | 2–2 | 1–2 | 1–2 | 1–2 | 1–2 | 0–3 | 2–1 | 2–1 | 1–2 | 1–2 | 2–1 | 2–1 |
| Detroit | 0–3 | 1–2 | 1–2 | 1–2 | 2–1 | 1–2 | 1–2 | 2–1 | 3–0 | 0–3 | 2–2 | 1–2 | 3–0 | 2–1 | 1–2 |
| Houston | 3–0 | 3–0 | 3–0 | 0–3 | 3–1 | 1–2 | 2–1 | 1–2 | 2–1 | 1–2 | 2–1 | 2–1 | 1–2 | 2–1 | 2–1 |
| Kansas City | 1–2 | 0–3 | 1–2 | 0–3 | 1–2 | 2–1 | 0–3 | 0–3 | 3–0 | 1–2 | 0–3 | 2–1 | 2–1 | 2–2 | 1–2 |
| Los Angeles | 1–2 | 1–2 | 3–0 | 0–3 | 1–2 | 0–4 | 0–3 | 1–2 | 2–1 | 1–2 | 2–1 | 0–3 | 2–1 | 3–0 | 2–1 |
| Minnesota | 3–0 | 0–3 | 2–1 | 2–1 | 2–1 | 1–2 | 1–2 | 2–2 | 2–1 | 2–1 | 2–1 | 2–1 | 1–2 | 2–1 | 1–2 |
| New York | 2–1 | 0–3 | 1–2 | 3–0 | 1–2 | 2–1 | 1–2 | 1–2 | 2–2 | 2–1 | 2–1 | 2–1 | 2–1 | 1–2 | 1–2 |
| Oakland | 1–2 | 2–1 | 0–3 | 1–2 | 2–1 | 0–3 | 0–3 | 3–0 | 0–3 | 0–3 | 2–1 | 0–3 | 2–2 | 1–2 | 0–3 |
| Seattle | 2–1 | 1–2 | 1–2 | 1–2 | 3–0 | 0–3 | 2–1 | 0–3 | 1–2 | 1–2 | 2–1 | 3–1 | 2–1 | 2–1 | 1–2 |
| Tampa Bay | 2–1 | 1–2 | 1–2 | 2–1 | 3–0 | 2–1 | 3–1 | 2–1 | 1–2 | 0–3 | 3–0 | 1–2 | 2–1 | 1–2 | 3–0 |
| Texas | 1–3 | 1–2 | 1–2 | 0–3 | 3–0 | 1–2 | 3–0 | 0–3 | 2–1 | 3–0 | 2–1 | 0–3 | 2–1 | 2–1 | 1–2 |
| Toronto | 3–0 | 3–0 | 1–2 | 2–1 | 2–1 | 2–1 | 2–1 | 2–1 | 3–0 | 1–3 | 3–0 | 1–2 | 2–1 | 1–2 | 2–1 |

Updated with the results of all games through October 1, 2023.

== Regular season ==
=== Game log ===
Please do not edit this line: OgreBot Begin-->

Legend
| | Twins win |
| | Twins loss |
| | Postponement |
| | Clinched division |
| **Bold** | Twins team member |

2023 Game Log: 87–75 (Home: 47–34; Away: 40–41)
March/April: 17–12 (Home: 10–6; Away: 7–6)

| # | Date | Opponent | Score | Win | Loss | Save | Attendance | Record | Streak |
|---|---|---|---|---|---|---|---|---|---|
| 1 | March 30 | @ Royals | 2–0 | **P. López** (1–0) | Greinke (0–1) | **Durán** (1) | 38,351 | 1–0 | W1 |
| 2 | April 1 | @ Royals | 2–0 | **Gray** (1–0) | Lyles (0–1) | **J. López** (1) | 16,633 | 2–0 | W2 |
| 3 | April 2 | @ Royals | 7–4 | **Ryan** (1–0) | Keller (0–1) | — | 14,589 | 3–0 | W3 |
| 4 | April 3 | @ Marlins | 11–1 | **Mahle** (1–0) | Cueto (0–1) | — | 8,898 | 4–0 | W4 |
| 5 | April 4 | @ Marlins | 0–1 | Alcántara (1–0) | **Maeda** (0–1) | — | 10,668 | 4–1 | L1 |
| 6 | April 5 | @ Marlins | 2–5 | Floro (1–0) | **Jax** (0–1) | — | 8,981 | 4–2 | L2 |
| — | April 6 | Astros | Postponed (inclement weather); Makeup: April 7. | | | | | | |
| 7 | April 7 | Astros | 3–2 (10) | **J. López** (1–0) | Stanek (1–1) | — | 38,465 | 5–2 | W1 |
| 8 | April 8 | Astros | 9–6 | **Ryan** (2–0) | Martinez (1–1) | **Durán** (2) | 26,330 | 6–2 | W2 |
| 9 | April 9 | Astros | 1–5 | Brown (1–0) | **Mahle** (1–1) | — | 14,316 | 6–3 | L1 |
| 10 | April 10 | White Sox | 3–4 | Cease (2–0) | **Maeda** (0–2) | López (2) | 12,078 | 6–4 | L2 |
| 11 | April 11 | White Sox | 4–3 (10) | **Jax** (1–1) | Scholtens (0–1) | — | 16,153 | 7–4 | W1 |
| 12 | April 12 | White Sox | 3–1 | **Gray** (2–0) | Giolito (0–1) | **Durán** (3) | 17,658 | 8–4 | W2 |
| 13 | April 13 | @ Yankees | 11–2 | **Ryan** (3–0) | Brito (2–1) | — | 39,024 | 9–4 | W3 |
| 14 | April 14 | @ Yankees | 4–3 | **Pagán** (1–0) | Holmes (0–1) | **Durán** (4) | 41,039 | 10–4 | W4 |
| 15 | April 15 | @ Yankees | 1–6 | Germán (1–1) | **Mahle** (1–2) | — | 38,363 | 10–5 | L1 |
| 16 | April 16 | @ Yankees | 0–2 | Cole (4–0) | **P. López** (1–1) | — | 39,342 | 10–6 | L2 |
| 17 | April 18 | @ Red Sox | 4–5 (10) | Schreiber (1–0) | **Morán** (0–1) | — | 28,132 | 10–7 | L3 |
| 18 | April 19 | @ Red Sox | 10–4 | **Ryan** (4–0) | Kluber (0–4) | **Headrick** (1) | 30,027 | 11–7 | W1 |
| 19 | April 20 | @ Red Sox | 5–11 | Houck (3–0) | **Maeda** (0–3) | — | 34,427 | 11–8 | L1 |
| 20 | April 21 | Nationals | 2–3 | Ramírez (1–1) | **Jax** (1–2) | Finnegan (4) | 12,469 | 11–9 | L2 |
| 21 | April 22 | Nationals | 4–10 | Thompson (2–1) | **P. López** (1–2) | — | 23,045 | 11–10 | L3 |
| 22 | April 23 | Nationals | 3–1 | **Ober** (1–0) | Corbin (1–3) | **Durán** (5) | 14,763 | 12–10 | W1 |
| 23 | April 24 | Yankees | 6–1 | **Gray** (3–0) | Brito (2–2) | — | 16,242 | 13–10 | W2 |
| 24 | April 25 | Yankees | 6–2 | **Ryan** (5–0) | Cortés Jr. (3–1) | — | 19,201 | 14–10 | W3 |
| 25 | April 26 | Yankees | 6–12 | Germán (2–2) | **Maeda** (0–4) | — | 20,511 | 14–11 | L1 |
| 26 | April 27 | Royals | 7–1 | **Stewart** (1–0) | Greinke (0–4) | — | 12,862 | 15–11 | W1 |
| 27 | April 28 | Royals | 8–6 | **P. López** (2–2) | Lyles (0–5) | **J. López** (2) | 11,754 | 16–11 | W2 |
| 28 | April 29 | Royals | 2–3 | Chapman (1–1) | **Durán** (0–1) | Barlow (4) | 22,883 | 16–12 | L1 |
| 29 | April 30 | Royals | 8–4 | **Gray** (4–0) | Singer (2–3) | **Durán** (6) | 17,150 | 17–12 | W1 |

May: 12–15 (Home: 6–6; Away: 6–9)

| # | Date | Opponent | Score | Win | Loss | Save | Attendance | Record | Streak |
|---|---|---|---|---|---|---|---|---|---|
| 30 | May 2 | @ White Sox | 2–3 (10) | Lambert (2–1) | **Thielbar** (0–1) | — | 13,094 | 17–13 | L1 |
| 31 | May 3 | @ White Sox | 4–6 | Santos (1–0) | **Jax** (1–3) | Middleton (1) | 11,468 | 17–14 | L2 |
| 32 | May 4 | @ White Sox | 7–3 (12) | **Pagán** (2–0) | Colomé (0–1) | — | 14,650 | 18–14 | W1 |
| 33 | May 5 | @ Guardians | 2–0 | **Ober** (2–0) | Battenfield (0–3) | **Durán** (7) | 17,849 | 19–14 | W2 |
| 34 | May 6 | @ Guardians | 3–4 | Stephan (2–1) | **Alcalá** (0–1) | Clase (11) | 20,795 | 19–15 | L1 |
| 35 | May 7 | @ Guardians | 0–2 | Quantrill (2–2) | **Ryan** (5–1) | Clase (12) | 17,477 | 19–16 | L2 |
| 36 | May 9 | Padres | 1–6 | Wacha (3–1) | **Jax** (1–4) | — | 16,882 | 19–17 | L3 |
| 37 | May 10 | Padres | 4–3 (11) | **Jax** (2–4) | Tapia (0–1) | — | 18,467 | 20–17 | W1 |
| 38 | May 11 | Padres | 5–3 | **Pagán** (3–0) | Honeywell Jr. (2–2) | **J. López** (3) | 23,365 | 21–17 | W2 |
| 39 | May 12 | Cubs | 2–6 | Smyly (4–1) | **Jax** (2–5) | — | 30,037 | 21–18 | L1 |
| 40 | May 13 | Cubs | 11–1 | **Ryan** (6–1) | Wesneski (2–2) | — | 32,270 | 22–18 | W1 |
| 41 | May 14 | Cubs | 16–3 | **Varland** (1–0) | Stroman (2–4) | — | 33,419 | 23–18 | W2 |
| 42 | May 15 | @ Dodgers | 8–9 (12) | Bickford (1–1) | **J. López** (1–1) | — | 49,749 | 23–19 | L1 |
| 43 | May 16 | @ Dodgers | 5–1 | **Ober** (3–0) | Kershaw (6–3) | — | 52,159 | 24–19 | W1 |
| 44 | May 17 | @ Dodgers | 3–7 | Graterol (2–1) | **De León** (0–1) | — | 36,434 | 24–20 | L1 |
| 45 | May 19 | @ Angels | 4–5 | Weiss (1–0) | **Jax** (2–5) | Estévez (11) | 31,079 | 24–21 | L2 |
| 46 | May 20 | @ Angels | 6–2 | **Varland** (2–0) | Sandoval (3–3) | — | 35,688 | 25–21 | W1 |
| 47 | May 21 | @ Angels | 2–4 | Devenski (2–0) | **P. López** (2–3) | Estévez (12) | 42,138 | 25–22 | L1 |
| 48 | May 22 | Giants | 1–4 | Manaea (2–2) | **Ober** (3–1) | Alexander (1) | 16,627 | 25–23 | L2 |
| 49 | May 23 | Giants | 3–4 | Cobb (4–1) | **J. López** (1–2) | Doval (13) | 20,790 | 25–24 | L3 |
| 50 | May 24 | Giants | 7–1 | **Ryan** (7–1) | DeSclafani (3–4) | — | 23,464 | 26–24 | W1 |
| 51 | May 26 | Blue Jays | 1–3 | Gausman (3–3) | **Varland** (2–1) | Romano (11) | 25,061 | 26–25 | L1 |
| 52 | May 27 | Blue Jays | 9–7 | **P. López** (3–3) | Bassitt (5–4) | **Stewart** (1) | 29,111 | 27–25 | W1 |
| 53 | May 28 | Blue Jays | 0–3 | Berríos (5–4) | **Ober** (3–2) | Romano (12) | 31,025 | 27–26 | L1 |
| 54 | May 29 | @ Astros | 7–5 (10) | **Durán** (1–1) | Abreu (2–1) | — | 40,744 | 28–26 | W1 |
| 55 | May 30 | @ Astros | 1–5 | Bielak (2–2) | **Ryan** (7–2) | — | 34,604 | 28–27 | L1 |
| 56 | May 31 | @ Astros | 8–2 | **Varland** (3–1) | Brown (5–2) | — | 37,127 | 29–27 | W1 |

June: 12–15 (Home: 7–7; Away: 5–8)

| # | Date | Opponent | Score | Win | Loss | Save | Attendance | Record | Streak |
|---|---|---|---|---|---|---|---|---|---|
| 57 | June 1 | Guardians | 7–6 | **Jax** (3–6) | Morgan (2–1) | — | 16,788 | 30–27 | W2 |
| 58 | June 2 | Guardians | 1–0 | **Stewart** (2–0) | Sandlin (2–3) | **Durán** (8) | 26,818 | 31–27 | W3 |
| 59 | June 3 | Guardians | 2–4 | Allen (3–2) | **Gray** (4–1) | Clase (18) | 27,153 | 31–28 | L1 |
| 60 | June 4 | Guardians | 1–2 | Karinchak (2–4) | **Ryan** (7–3) | Clase (19) | 23,629 | 31–29 | L2 |
| 61 | June 6 | @ Rays | 0–7 | Eflin (8–1) | **Varland** (3–2) | — | 14,689 | 31–30 | L3 |
| 62 | June 7 | @ Rays | 1–2 | Adam (2–1) | **Durán** (1–2) | — | 10,846 | 31–31 | L4 |
| 63 | June 8 | @ Rays | 2–4 | Chirinos (3–1) | **Ober** (3–3) | Adam (10) | 12,584 | 31–32 | L5 |
| 64 | June 9 | @ Blue Jays | 3–2 (10) | **Durán** (2–2) | Cimber (0–1) | — | 35,222 | 32–32 | W1 |
| 65 | June 10 | @ Blue Jays | 9–4 | **J. López** (2–2) | Cimber (0–2) | — | 41,990 | 33–32 | W2 |
| 66 | June 11 | @ Blue Jays | 6–7 | Pearson (4–0) | **Pagán** (3–1) | Romano (18) | 41,673 | 33–33 | L1 |
| 67 | June 13 | Brewers | 7–5 | **Winder** (1–0) | Williams (3–1) | — | 34,514 | 34–33 | W1 |
| 68 | June 14 | Brewers | 4–2 | **Ober** (4–3) | Rea (3–4) | **Jax** (1) | 32,222 | 35–33 | W2 |
| 69 | June 15 | Tigers | 4–8 | Boyd (4–5) | **Morán** (0–2) | — | 27,570 | 35–34 | L1 |
| 70 | June 16 | Tigers | 1–7 | Englert (2–2) | **Ryan** (7–4) | — | 27,170 | 35–35 | L2 |
| 71 | June 17 | Tigers | 2–0 | **Headrick** (1–0) | Wentz (1–7) | **Durán** (9) | 26,950 | 36–35 | W1 |
| 72 | June 18 | Tigers | 4–6 | White (1–0) | **Varland** (3–3) | Foley (3) | 31,221 | 36–36 | L1 |
| 73 | June 19 | Red Sox | 3–9 | Paxton (3–1) | **P. López** (3–4) | — | 22,081 | 36–37 | L2 |
| 74 | June 20 | Red Sox | 4–10 | Crawford (2–3) | **Ober** (4–4) | Kluber (1) | 22,650 | 36–38 | L3 |
| 75 | June 21 | Red Sox | 5–4 (10) | **Morán** (1–2) | Ort (1–1) | — | 23,912 | 37–38 | W1 |
| 76 | June 22 | Red Sox | 6–0 | **Ryan** (8–4) | Garza (0–2) | — | 28,553 | 38–38 | W2 |
| 77 | June 23 | @ Tigers | 4–1 | **Maeda** (1–4) | Wentz (1–8) | **Durán** (10) | 19,782 | 39–38 | W3 |
| 78 | June 24 | @ Tigers | 2–3 | Olson (1–2) | **P. López** (3–5) | Lange (12) | 24,403 | 39–39 | L1 |
| 79 | June 25 | @ Tigers | 6–3 (10) | **Jax** (4–6) | White (1–1) | **Durán** (11) | 21,585 | 40–39 | W1 |
| 80 | June 26 | @ Braves | 1–4 | Strider (9–2) | **Gray** (4–2) | Yates (1) | 40,884 | 40–40 | L1 |
| 81 | June 27 | @ Braves | 2–6 | Elder (6–1) | **Ryan** (8–5) | — | 42,635 | 40–41 | L2 |
| 82 | June 28 | @ Braves | 0–3 | Yates (3–0) | **Maeda** (1–5) | Iglesias (13) | 38,260 | 40–42 | L3 |
| 83 | June 30 | @ Orioles | 8–1 | **P. López** (4–5) | Kremer (8–4) | — | 34,792 | 41–42 | W1 |

July: 13–11 (Home: 7–5; Away: 6–6)

| # | Date | Opponent | Score | Win | Loss | Save | Attendance | Record | Streak |
|---|---|---|---|---|---|---|---|---|---|
| 84 | July 1 | @ Orioles | 1–0 | **Ober** (5–4) | Bradish (4–4) | **Durán** (12) | 40,012 | 42–42 | W2 |
| 85 | July 2 | @ Orioles | 1–2 | Pérez (2–1) | **Durán** (2–3) | Bautista (22) | 16,299 | 42–43 | L1 |
| 86 | July 3 | Royals | 8–4 | **Headrick** (2–0) | Clarke (1–3) | — | 28,218 | 43–43 | W1 |
| 87 | July 4 | Royals | 9–3 | **Maeda** (2–5) | Greinke (1–9) | — | 25,033 | 44–43 | W2 |
| 88 | July 5 | Royals | 5–0 | **P. López** (5–5) | Marsh (0–2) | — | 19,692 | 45–43 | W3 |
| 89 | July 7 | Orioles | 1–3 (10) | Bautista (4–1) | **Durán** (2–4) | — | 32,724 | 45–44 | L1 |
| 90 | July 8 | Orioles | 2–6 | Wells (7–4) | **Gray** (4–3) | — | 27,617 | 45–45 | L2 |
| 91 | July 9 | Orioles | 2–15 | Gibson (9–6) | **Ryan** (8–6) | — | 27,100 | 45–46 | L3 |
| ASG | July 11 | NL @ AL | 3–2 | Doval (1–0) | Bautista (0–1) | Kimbrel (1) | 47,159 | — | N/A |
| 92 | July 14 | @ Athletics | 5–4 | **Jax** (5–6) | Fujinami (5–8) | **Durán** (13) | 7,923 | 46–46 | W1 |
| 93 | July 15 | @ Athletics | 10–7 | **Morán** (2–2) | Tarnok (0–1) | **Durán** (14) | 10,534 | 47–46 | W2 |
| 94 | July 16 | @ Athletics | 5–4 | **J. López** (3–2) | Erceg (2–1) | **Durán** (15) | 9,335 | 48–46 | W2 |
| 95 | July 17 | @ Mariners | 6–7 | Gilbert (8–5) | **Gray** (4–4) | Sewald (19) | 25,770 | 48–47 | L1 |
| 96 | July 18 | @ Mariners | 10–3 | **Ober** (6–4) | Woo (1–2) | — | 28,141 | 49–47 | W1 |
| 97 | July 19 | @ Mariners | 6–3 | **Jax** (6–6) | Muñoz (2–3) | **Durán** (16) | 25,825 | 50–47 | W2 |
| 98 | July 20 | @ Mariners | 0–5 | Kirby (9–8) | **P. López** (5–6) | — | 29,443 | 50–48 | L1 |
| 99 | July 21 | White Sox | 9–4 | **Ryan** (9–6) | Lynn (6–9) | — | 31,339 | 51–48 | W1 |
| 100 | July 22 | White Sox | 3–2 | **Balazovic** (1–0) | Middleton (2–2) | **Durán** (17) | 30,894 | 52–48 | W2 |
| 101 | July 23 | White Sox | 5–4 (12) | **Pagán** (5–1) | Scholtens (1–3) | — | 29,001 | 53–48 | W3 |
| 102 | July 24 | Mariners | 4–3 (10) | **J. López** (4–2) | Sewald (3–1) | — | 22,969 | 54–48 | W4 |
| 103 | July 25 | Mariners | 7–9 | Brash (5–3) | **Ortega** (0–1) | Sewald (20) | 26,824 | 54–49 | L1 |
| 104 | July 26 | Mariners | 7–8 | Miller (7–3) | **Ryan** (9–7) | Muñoz (2) | 25,728 | 54–50 | L2 |
| 105 | July 28 | @ Royals | 5–8 (10) | Clarke (2–4) | **Durán** (2–5) | — | 23,022 | 54–51 | L3 |
| 106 | July 29 | @ Royals | 7–10 | Lyles (2–12) | **Ober** (6–5) | Barlow (13) | 20,643 | 54–52 | L4 |
| 107 | July 30 | @ Royals | 1–2 | Yarbrough (4–5) | **Maeda** (2–6) | Hernández (1) | 13,752 | 54–53 | L5 |

August: 15–12 (Home: 10–5; Away: 5–7)

| # | Date | Opponent | Score | Win | Loss | Save | Attendance | Record | Streak |
|---|---|---|---|---|---|---|---|---|---|
| 108 | August 1 | @ Cardinals | 3–2 | **López** (6–6) | Mikolas (6–7) | **Durán** (18) | 37,162 | 55–53 | W1 |
| 109 | August 2 | @ Cardinals | 3–7 | Hudson (2–0) | **Ryan** (9–8) | — | 34,332 | 55–54 | L1 |
| 110 | August 3 | @ Cardinals | 5–3 | **Gray** (5–4) | Liberatore (1–4) | **Durán** (19) | 36,949 | 56–54 | W1 |
| 111 | August 4 | Diamondbacks | 3–2 | **Thielbar** (1–1) | McGough (1–7) | **Durán** (20) | 29,408 | 57–54 | W2 |
| 112 | August 5 | Diamondbacks | 12–1 | **Maeda** (3–6) | Nelson (6–6) | — | 34,044 | 58–54 | W3 |
| 113 | August 6 | Diamondbacks | 5–3 | **Thielbar** (2–1) | Sewald (3–2) | — | 24,778 | 59–54 | W4 |
| 114 | August 7 | @ Tigers | 9–3 | **López** (7–6) | Wentz (2–10) | — | 13,779 | 60–54 | W5 |
| 115 | August 8 | @ Tigers | 0–6 | Rodríguez (8–5) | **Gray** (5–5) | — | 16,588 | 60–55 | L1 |
| 116 | August 9 | @ Tigers | 5–9 | Holton (1–2) | **Ober** (6–6) | Cisnero (2) | 16,570 | 60–56 | L2 |
| 117 | August 10 | @ Tigers | 0–3 | Olson (2–5) | **Maeda** (3–7) | Brieske (2) | 18,709 | 60–57 | L3 |
| 118 | August 11 | @ Phillies | 2–13 | Sánchez (1–3) | **Keuchel** (0–1) | — | 33,071 | 60–58 | L4 |
| 119 | August 12 | @ Phillies | 8–1 | **López** (8–6) | Walker (13–5) | — | 40,117 | 61–58 | W1 |
| 120 | August 13 | @ Phillies | 3–0 | **Gray** (6–5) | Suárez (2–6) | **Durán** (21) | 40,111 | 62–58 | W2 |
| 121 | August 15 | Tigers | 5–3 | **Floro** (4–5) | Cisnero (2–3) | **Durán** (22) | 30,150 | 63–58 | W3 |
| 122 | August 16 | Tigers | 7–8 | Holton (2–2) | **Jax** (5–7) | — | 26,716 | 63–59 | L1 |
| 123 | August 18 | Pirates | 5–1 | **López** (9–6) | Jackson (0–1) | — | 30,687 | 64–59 | W1 |
| 124 | August 19 | Pirates | 4–7 | Keller (10–8) | **Gray** (6–6) | Bednar (26) | 23,822 | 64–60 | L1 |
| 125 | August 20 | Pirates | 2–0 | **Keuchel** (1–1) | Bido (2–4) | **Durán** (23) | 25,987 | 65–60 | W1 |
| 126 | August 22 | @ Brewers | 3–7 | Wilson (5–0) | **Floro** (4–6) | — | 38,688 | 65–61 | L1 |
| 127 | August 23 | @ Brewers | 7–8 (10) | Peguero (4–4) | **Durán** (2–6) | — | 38,164 | 65–62 | L2 |
| 128 | August 24 | Rangers | 7–5 | **Winder** (2–0) | Sborz (5–6) | **Jax** (2) | 23,333 | 66–62 | W1 |
| 129 | August 25 | Rangers | 12–2 | **Gray** (7–6) | Dunning (9–6) | — | 25,144 | 67–62 | W2 |
| 130 | August 26 | Rangers | 2–6 | Burke (5–2) | **Jax** (5–8) | — | 25,843 | 67–63 | L1 |
| 131 | August 27 | Rangers | 7–6 (13) | **Floro** (5–6) | Hernández (1–2) | — | 24,431 | 68–63 | W1 |
| 132 | August 28 | Guardians | 10–6 | **Funderburk** (1–0) | Curry (3–3) | **Winder** (1) | 20,323 | 69–63 | W2 |
| 133 | August 29 | Guardians | 2–4 | Gaddis (2–1) | **López** (9–7) | Clase (35) | 23,433 | 69–64 | L1 |
| 134 | August 30 | Guardians | 2–5 (10) | Stephan (6–4) | **Pagán** (5–2) | Clase (36) | 20,169 | 69–65 | L2 |

September/October: 18–10 (Home: 7–5; Away: 11–5)

| # | Date | Opponent | Score | Win | Loss | Save | Attendance | Record | Streak |
|---|---|---|---|---|---|---|---|---|---|
| 135 | September 1 | @ Rangers | 5–1 | **Ryan** (10–8) | Burke (5–3) | — | 26,940 | 70–65 | W1 |
| 136 | September 2 | @ Rangers | 9–7 (10) | **Headrick** (3–0) | Chapman (5–4) | **Durán** (24) | 36,555 | 71–65 | W2 |
| 137 | September 3 | @ Rangers | 5–6 | Bradford (3–1) | **Winder** (2–1) | — | 35,531 | 71–66 | L1 |
| 138 | September 4 | @ Guardians | 20–6 | **López** (10–7) | Giolito (7–12) | — | 17,359 | 72–66 | W1 |
| 139 | September 5 | @ Guardians | 8–3 | **Jax** (6–8) | Stephan (6–6) | — | 20,224 | 73–66 | W2 |
| 140 | September 6 | @ Guardians | 1–2 | Williams (2–5) | **Ryan** (10–9) | Clase (38) | 16,148 | 73–67 | L1 |
| 141 | September 8 | Mets | 5–2 | **Thielbar** (3–1) | Reid-Foley (0–1) | **Durán** (25) | 26,154 | 74–67 | W1 |
| 142 | September 9 | Mets | 8–4 | **Maeda** (4–7) | Peterson (3–8) | — | 30,673 | 75–67 | W2 |
| 143 | September 10 | Mets | 0–2 | Raley (1–2) | **Jax** (6–9) | Ottavino (9) | 22,890 | 75–68 | L1 |
| 144 | September 11 | Rays | 4–7 | Glasnow (9–5) | **Gray** (7–7) | Fairbanks (23) | 18,683 | 75–69 | L2 |
| 145 | September 12 | Rays | 3–2 | **Varland** (4–3) | Littell (3–6) | **Durán** (26) | 24,390 | 76–69 | W1 |
| 146 | September 13 | Rays | 4–5 | Kelly (5–2) | **Jax** (6–10) | Stephenson (1) | 18,342 | 76–70 | L1 |
| 147 | September 14 | @ White Sox | 10–2 | **Maeda** (5–7) | Ureña (0–6) | — | 13,233 | 77–70 | W1 |
| 148 | September 15 | @ White Sox | 10–2 | **Ober** (7–6) | Scholtens (1–9) | — | 18,001 | 78–70 | W2 |
| 149 | September 16 | @ White Sox | 6–7 | Toussaint (4–7) | **López** (10–8) | Banks (1) | 24,964 | 78–71 | L1 |
| 150 | September 17 | @ White Sox | 4–0 | **Gray** (8–7) | Cease (7–8) | — | 17,641 | 79–71 | W1 |
| 151 | September 18 | @ Reds | 3–7 | Phillips (1–0) | **Ryan** (10–10) | — | 15,364 | 79–72 | L1 |
| 152 | September 19 | @ Reds | 7–0 | **Maeda** (6–7) | Cruz (1–2) | — | 24,186 | 80–72 | W1 |
| 153 | September 20 | @ Reds | 5–3 | **Durán** (3–6) | Díaz (9–5) | **Jax** (3) | 22,306 | 81–72 | W2 |
| 154 | September 22 | Angels | 8–6 | **López** (11–8) | Daniel (0–1) | **Durán** (27) | 32,006 | 82–72 | W3 |
| 155 | September 23 | Angels | 0–1 | Rosenberg (2–2) | **Gray** (8–8) | Estévez (31) | 31,403 | 82–73 | L1 |
| 156 | September 24 | Angels | 9–3 | **Ryan** (11–10) | Fulmer (0–1) | — | 24,232 | 83–73 | W1 |
| 157 | September 26 | Athletics | 11–3 | **Ober** (8–6) | Blackburn (4–7) | — | 22,329 | 84–73 | W2 |
| 158 | September 27 | Athletics | 6–4 | **Keuchel** (2–1) | Jiménez (0–2) | **Jax** (4) | 20,520 | 85–73 | W3 |
| 159 | September 28 | Athletics | 1–2 | Erceg (4–4) | **Maeda** (6–8) | May (21) | 19,466 | 85–74 | L1 |
| 160 | September 29 | @ Rockies | 7–6 | **Funderburk** (2–0) | Kinley (0–4) | **Pagán** (1) | 47,272 | 86–74 | W1 |
| 161 | September 30 | @ Rockies | 14–6 | **Paddack** (1–0) | Kauffmann (2–5) | — | 40,264 | 87–74 | W2 |
| 162 | October 1 | @ Rockies | 2–3 (11) | Hollowell (2–0) | **Luplow** (0–1) | — | 33,375 | 87–75 | L1 |

== Postseason ==
=== Game log ===
2023 Postseason game log: 3–3 (Home: 2–2; Away: 1–1)
AL Wild Card Series: 2–0 (Home: 2–0; Away: 0–0)

| # | Date | Opponent | Score | Win | Loss | Save | Attendance | Record | Streak |
|---|---|---|---|---|---|---|---|---|---|
| 1 | October 3 | Blue Jays | 3–1 | López (1–0) | Gausman (0–1) | Durán (1) | 38,450 | 1–0 | W1 |
| 2 | October 4 | Blue Jays | 2–0 | Gray (1–0) | Berríos (0–1) | Durán (2) | 38,518 | 2–0 | W2 |

AL Division Series: 1–3 (Home: 0–2; Away: 1–1)

| # | Date | Opponent | Score | Win | Loss | Save | Attendance | Record | Streak |
|---|---|---|---|---|---|---|---|---|---|
| 1 | October 7 | @ Astros | 4–6 | Verlander (1–0) | Ober (0–1) | Pressly (1) | 43,024 | 0–1 | L1 |
| 2 | October 8 | @ Astros | 6–2 | López (2–0) | Valdez (0–1) | — | 43,017 | 1–1 | W1 |
| 3 | October 10 | Astros | 1–9 | Javier (1–0) | Gray (1–1) | — | 41,017 | 1–2 | L1 |
| 4 | October 11 | Astros | 2–3 | Urquidy (1–0) | Thielbar (0–1) | Pressly (2) | 40,977 | 1–3 | L2 |

=== Postseason rosters ===
Playoff rosters
American League Wild Card Series

- Pitchers: 15 Emilio Pagán 18 Kenta Maeda 20 Chris Paddack 22 Griffin Jax 37 Louie Varland 41 Joe Ryan 49 Pablo López 54 Sonny Gray 55 Kody Funderburk 56 Caleb Thielbar 59 Jhoan Durán 61 Brock Stewart
- Catchers: 8 Christian Vázquez 27 Ryan Jeffers
- Infielders: 4 Carlos Correa 11 Jorge Polanco 12 Kyle Farmer 19 Alex Kirilloff 39 Donovan Solano 47 Edouard Julien
- Outfielders: 2 Michael A. Taylor 26 Max Kepler 38 Matt Wallner 45 Andrew Stevenson 50 Willi Castro
- Designated hitters: 23 Royce Lewis

American League Division Series

- Pitchers: 15 Emilio Pagán 17 Bailey Ober 18 Kenta Maeda 20 Chris Paddack 22 Griffin Jax 37 Louie Varland 41 Joe Ryan 49 Pablo López 54 Sonny Gray 56 Caleb Thielbar 59 Jhoan Durán 61 Brock Stewart
- Catchers: 8 Christian Vázquez 27 Ryan Jeffers
- Infielders: 4 Carlos Correa 11 Jorge Polanco 12 Kyle Farmer 19 Alex Kirilloff (Games 1–3) 39 Donovan Solano 47 Edouard Julien
- Outfielders: 2 Michael A. Taylor 26 Max Kepler 38 Matt Wallner 45 Andrew Stevenson 50 Willi Castro
- Designated hitters: 23 Royce Lewis 25 Byron Buxton (Game 4)

== Roster ==
2023 Minnesota Twins
Roster
| Pitchers: 66 Jorge Alcalá; 81 Jordan Balazovic; 87 José De León; 59 Jhoan Durán; 58 Dylan Floro; 55 Kody Funderburk; 54 Sonny Gray; 53 Brent Headrick; 22 Griffin Jax; 60 Dallas Keuchel; 48 Jorge López; 49 Pablo López; 18 Kenta Maeda; 51 Tyler Mahle; 71 Jovani Morán; 17 Bailey Ober; 62 Oliver Ortega; 20 Chris Paddack; 15 Emilio Pagán; 58 Dereck Rodríguez; 41 Joe Ryan; 77 Cole Sands; 61 Brock Stewart; 56 Caleb Thielbar; 37 Louie Varland; 74 Josh Winder; 78 Simeon Woods Richardson | Catchers: 27 Ryan Jeffers; 8 Christian Vázquez; Infielders: 4 Carlos Correa; 12 Kyle Farmer; 47 Edouard Julien; 19 Alex Kirilloff; 23 Royce Lewis; 64 José Miranda; 11 Jorge Polanco; 39 Donovan Solano | Outfielders: 50 Willi Castro; 13 Joey Gallo; 30 Kyle Garlick; 1 Nick Gordon; 26 Max Kepler; 9 Trevor Larnach; 16 Jordan Luplow; 45 Andrew Stevenson; 2 Michael A. Taylor; 38 Matt Wallner; Other batters: 25 Byron Buxton | Manager: 5 Rocco Baldelli; Coaches: 35 Hank Conger (first base/catching); 75 Nate Dammann (quality control); 98 Anderson De La Rosa (bullpen catcher); 46 Tony Diaz (assistant bench); 63 Rudy Hernández (hitting); 88 Pete Maki (pitching); 98 Connor Olson (bullpen catcher); 79 David Popkins (hitting); 91 Luis Ramirez (assistant pitching); 67 Derek Shomon (assistant hitting); 84 Colby Suggs (bullpen); 33 Jayce Tingler (bench); 40 Tommy Watkins (third base) |

== Player statistics ==
| = Indicates team leader |

=== Batting ===
Note: G = Games played; AB = At bats; R = Runs; H = Hits; 2B = Doubles; 3B = Triples; HR = Home runs; RBI = Runs batted in; SB = Stolen bases; BB = Walks; AVG = Batting average; SLG = Slugging average

| Player | G | AB | R | H | 2B | 3B | HR | RBI | SB | BB | AVG | SLG |
|---|---|---|---|---|---|---|---|---|---|---|---|---|
| Carlos Correa | 135 | 514 | 60 | 118 | 29 | 2 | 18 | 65 | 0 | 59 | .230 | .399 |
| Max Kepler | 130 | 438 | 72 | 114 | 22 | 2 | 24 | 66 | 1 | 45 | .260 | .484 |
| Donovan Solano | 134 | 394 | 43 | 111 | 26 | 1 | 5 | 38 | 0 | 40 | .282 | .391 |
| Willi Castro | 124 | 358 | 60 | 92 | 18 | 5 | 9 | 34 | 33 | 34 | .257 | .411 |
| Michael A. Taylor | 129 | 355 | 48 | 78 | 14 | 1 | 21 | 51 | 13 | 26 | .220 | .442 |
| Edouard Julien | 109 | 338 | 60 | 89 | 16 | 1 | 16 | 37 | 3 | 64 | .263 | .459 |
| Kyle Farmer | 120 | 336 | 49 | 86 | 14 | 2 | 11 | 46 | 2 | 23 | .256 | .408 |
| Christian Vázquez | 102 | 327 | 34 | 73 | 13 | 0 | 6 | 32 | 1 | 25 | .223 | .318 |
| Byron Buxton | 85 | 304 | 49 | 63 | 17 | 1 | 17 | 42 | 9 | 35 | .207 | .438 |
| Jorge Polanco | 80 | 302 | 38 | 77 | 18 | 0 | 14 | 48 | 4 | 36 | .255 | .454 |
| Ryan Jeffers | 96 | 286 | 46 | 79 | 15 | 2 | 14 | 43 | 3 | 33 | .276 | .490 |
| Joey Gallo | 111 | 282 | 39 | 50 | 9 | 1 | 21 | 40 | 1 | 48 | .177 | .440 |
| Alex Kirilloff | 88 | 281 | 35 | 76 | 14 | 1 | 11 | 41 | 1 | 28 | .270 | .445 |
| Royce Lewis | 58 | 217 | 36 | 67 | 7 | 0 | 15 | 52 | 6 | 20 | .309 | .548 |
| Matt Wallner | 76 | 213 | 42 | 53 | 11 | 1 | 14 | 41 | 2 | 28 | .249 | .507 |
| Trevor Larnach | 58 | 183 | 26 | 39 | 7 | 3 | 8 | 40 | 1 | 27 | .213 | .415 |
| José Miranda | 40 | 142 | 12 | 30 | 4 | 0 | 3 | 13 | 0 | 9 | .211 | .303 |
| Nick Gordon | 34 | 91 | 13 | 16 | 5 | 1 | 2 | 7 | 0 | 1 | .176 | .319 |
| Jordan Luplow | 32 | 63 | 10 | 13 | 3 | 0 | 2 | 4 | 2 | 9 | .206 | .349 |
| Andrew Stevenson | 25 | 37 | 4 | 7 | 1 | 0 | 0 | 1 | 4 | 2 | .189 | .216 |
| Kyle Garlick | 14 | 28 | 2 | 5 | 1 | 0 | 2 | 4 | 0 | 2 | .179 | .429 |
| Totals | 162 | 5489 | 778 | 1336 | 264 | 24 | 233 | 745 | 86 | 594 | .243 | .428 |
| Rank in AL | — | 10 | 5 | 9 | 9 | 6 | 1 | 5 | 11 | 2 | 10 | 4 |

Note: Carlos Correa is team leader in batting average (.230) and slugging average (.399) because he was the only player with +502 plate appearances for the Twins.

Source:Baseball Reference

=== Pitching ===
Note: W = Wins; L = Losses; ERA; G = Games pitched; GS = Games started; SV = Saves; IP = Innings pitched; H = Hits allowed; R = Runs allowed; ER = Earned runs allowed; BB = Walks allowed; SO = Strikeouts

| Player | W | L | ERA | G | GS | SV | IP | H | R | ER | BB | SO |
|---|---|---|---|---|---|---|---|---|---|---|---|---|
| Pablo López | 11 | 8 | 3.66 | 32 | 32 | 0 | 194.0 | 176 | 81 | 79 | 48 | 234 |
| Sonny Gray | 8 | 8 | 2.79 | 32 | 32 | 0 | 184.0 | 156 | 59 | 57 | 55 | 183 |
| Joe Ryan | 11 | 10 | 4.51 | 29 | 29 | 0 | 161.2 | 155 | 83 | 81 | 34 | 197 |
| Bailey Ober | 8 | 6 | 3.43 | 26 | 26 | 0 | 144.1 | 125 | 58 | 55 | 29 | 146 |
| Kenta Maeda | 6 | 8 | 4.23 | 21 | 20 | 0 | 104.1 | 94 | 50 | 49 | 28 | 117 |
| Emilio Pagán | 5 | 2 | 2.99 | 66 | 1 | 1 | 69.1 | 45 | 26 | 23 | 21 | 65 |
| Louie Varland | 4 | 3 | 4.63 | 17 | 10 | 0 | 68.0 | 66 | 35 | 35 | 17 | 71 |
| Griffin Jax | 6 | 10 | 3.86 | 71 | 0 | 4 | 65.1 | 58 | 30 | 28 | 19 | 68 |
| Jhoan Durán | 3 | 6 | 2.45 | 59 | 0 | 27 | 62.1 | 46 | 25 | 17 | 25 | 84 |
| Jovani Moran | 2 | 2 | 5.31 | 43 | 0 | 0 | 42.1 | 35 | 27 | 25 | 27 | 48 |
| Dallas Keuchel | 2 | 1 | 5.97 | 10 | 6 | 0 | 37.2 | 45 | 25 | 25 | 18 | 25 |
| Jorge López | 4 | 2 | 5.09 | 37 | 0 | 3 | 35.1 | 34 | 22 | 20 | 11 | 27 |
| Josh Winder | 2 | 1 | 4.15 | 19 | 0 | 1 | 34.2 | 35 | 16 | 16 | 14 | 28 |
| Caleb Thielbar | 3 | 1 | 3.23 | 36 | 0 | 0 | 30.2 | 23 | 12 | 11 | 6 | 36 |
| Brock Stewart | 2 | 0 | 0.65 | 28 | 0 | 1 | 27.2 | 19 | 2 | 2 | 11 | 39 |
| Brent Headrick | 3 | 0 | 6.31 | 14 | 0 | 1 | 25.2 | 27 | 18 | 18 | 10 | 30 |
| Tyler Mahle | 1 | 2 | 3.16 | 5 | 5 | 0 | 25.2 | 22 | 11 | 9 | 5 | 28 |
| Jordan Balazovic | 1 | 0 | 4.44 | 18 | 0 | 0 | 24.1 | 26 | 13 | 12 | 12 | 17 |
| Cole Sands | 0 | 0 | 3.74 | 15 | 0 | 0 | 21.2 | 20 | 10 | 9 | 13 | 21 |
| Jorge Alcalá | 0 | 1 | 6.23 | 11 | 0 | 0 | 17.1 | 14 | 13 | 12 | 10 | 16 |
| José De León | 0 | 1 | 4.67 | 12 | 1 | 0 | 17.1 | 16 | 10 | 9 | 5 | 17 |
| Dylan Floro | 2 | 1 | 5.29 | 19 | 0 | 0 | 17.0 | 22 | 10 | 10 | 6 | 17 |
| Oliver Ortega | 0 | 1 | 4.30 | 10 | 0 | 0 | 14.2 | 11 | 7 | 7 | 7 | 14 |
| Kody Funderburk | 2 | 0 | 0.75 | 11 | 0 | 0 | 12.0 | 6 | 1 | 1 | 5 | 19 |
| Chris Paddack | 1 | 0 | 5.40 | 2 | 0 | 0 | 5.0 | 6 | 3 | 3 | 1 | 8 |
| Simeon Woods Richardson | 0 | 0 | 9.64 | 1 | 0 | 0 | 4.2 | 7 | 5 | 5 | 3 | 5 |
| Willi Castro | 0 | 0 | 11.57 | 3 | 0 | 0 | 2.1 | 3 | 3 | 3 | 2 | 0 |
| Jordan Luplow | 0 | 1 | 13.50 | 2 | 0 | 0 | 1.1 | 1 | 3 | 2 | 0 | 0 |
| Dereck Rodríguez | 0 | 0 | 13.50 | 1 | 0 | 0 | 0.2 | 1 | 1 | 1 | 1 | 0 |
| Totals | 87 | 75 | 3.87 | 162 | 162 | 38 | 1451.1 | 1294 | 659 | 624 | 443 | 1560 |
| Rank in AL | 7 | 9 | 4 | — | — | 11 | 3 | 3 | 1 | 4 | 3 | 1 |

Source:Baseball Reference

== Farm system ==
| Level | Team | League | Manager |
|---|---|---|---|
| AAA | St. Paul Saints | International League | Toby Gardenhire |
| AA | Wichita Wind Surge | Texas League | Ramon Borrego |
| A-Advanced | Cedar Rapids Kernels | Midwest League | Brian Dinkelman |
| A | Fort Myers Mighty Mussels | Florida State League | Brian Meyer |
| Rookie | FCL Twins | Florida Complex League | Seth Feldman |
| Rookie | DSL Twins | Dominican Summer League | |
