= Pierson Ohl =

American baseball player (born 1999)

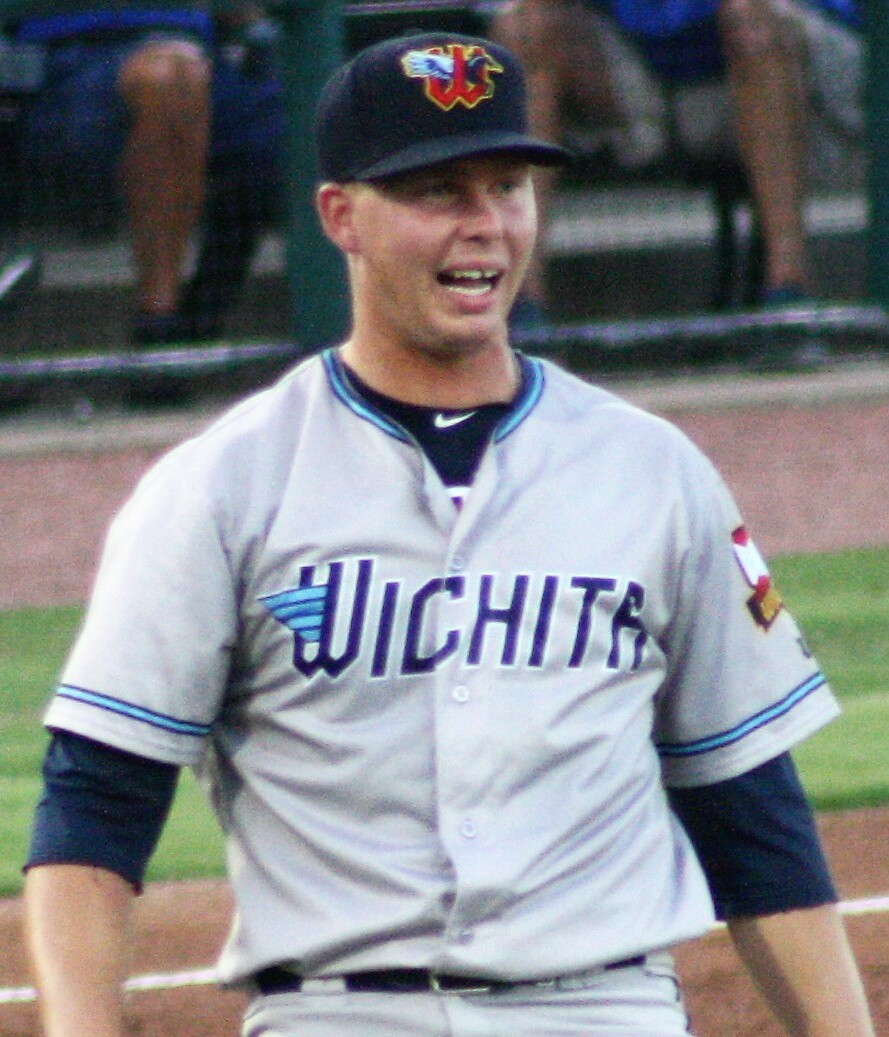
- Ohl with the Wichita Wind Surge in 2023

New York Mets
- Pitcher
- Born: September 10, 1999 (age 27); Moorpark, California, U.S.
- Bats: Right Throws: Right

MLB debut
- July 29, 2025, for the Minnesota Twins

MLB statistics (through 2025 season)
- Win–loss record: 0–3
- Earned run average: 5.10
- Strikeouts: 27
- Stats at Baseball Reference

Teams
- Minnesota Twins (2025)

Pierson Blaine Ohl (born September 10, 1999) is an American professional baseball pitcher for the New York Mets of Major League Baseball (MLB). He has previously played in MLB for the Minnesota Twins.

== Career ==
=== Minnesota Twins ===
Ohl attended Grace Brethren High School in Simi Valley, California, and played college baseball at Grand Canyon University. He was selected by the Minnesota Twins in the 14th round (429th overall) of the 2021 Major League Baseball draft. He made his professional debut with the rookie-level Florida Complex League Twins. Ohl made 20 appearances (18 starts) for the Single-A Fort Myers Mighty Mussels in 2022, compiling a 6-7 record and 3.53 ERA with 101 strikeouts across 91 2/3 innings pitched.

Ohl split the 2023 campaign between the High-A Cedar Rapids Kernels and Double-A Wichita Wind Surge. In 24 appearances (21 starts) for the two affiliates, he accumulated a 9-7 record and 3.32 ERA with 115 strikeouts across 127 1/3 innings pitched. Ohl returned to Wichita for the 2024 season, posting a 4-7 record and 4.68 ERA with 70 strikeouts and one save in 102 innings pitched across 21 games (15 starts).

Ohl began the 2025 season on the injured list, making two rehab outings for Fort Myers before being reassigned to Wichita; in 13 games for Wichita, he posted a 4-1 record and 2.08 ERA with 46 strikeouts and one save. On June 23, 2025, Ohl was promoted to the Triple-A St. Paul Saints. On July 29, Ohl was selected to the 40-man roster and promoted to the major leagues for the first time. He made 14 appearances (three starts) for Minnesota during his rookie campaign, posting an 0-3 record and 5.10 ERA with 27 strikeouts over 30 innings of work.

On January 23, 2026, Ohl was designated for assignment by the Twins.

=== New York Mets ===
On January 28, 2026, Ohl and Edouard Julien were traded to the Colorado Rockies in exchange for Jace Kaminska and cash considerations. On February 23, it was announced that Ohl would require season-ending Tommy John surgery after being diagnosed with a torn ulnar collateral ligament in his right elbow. On November 2, Ohl was claimed off of waivers by the New York Mets.
