= Colby Suggs =

American baseball coach (born 1991)

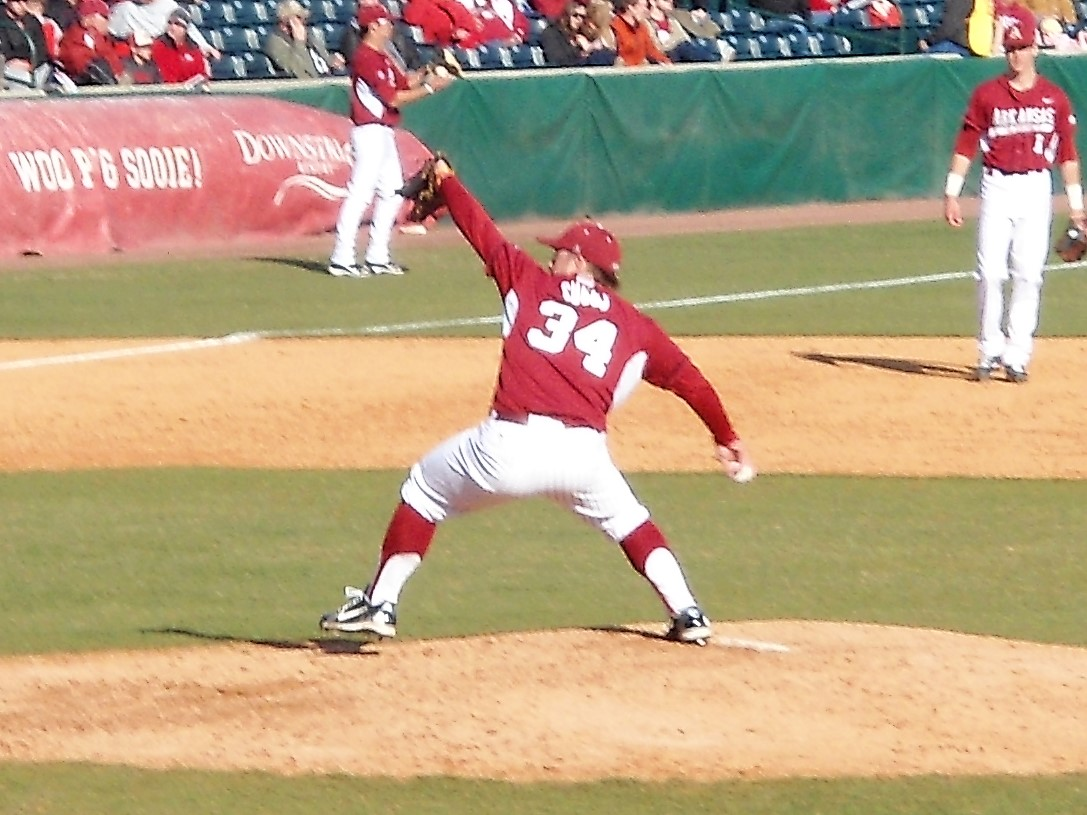
- Suggs with the Arkansas Razorbacks

Texas Rangers – No. 84
- Pitcher / Coach
- Born: October 25, 1991 (age 34); Sulphur Springs, Texas, U.S.
- Bats: Right Throws: Right

Teams
- As coach: Minnesota Twins (2022—2025); Texas Rangers (2026–present)

Logan Colby Suggs (born October 25, 1991) is an American professional baseball former pitcher and current coach who is the bullpen coach for the Texas Rangers of Major League Baseball (MLB). Before playing professionally, Suggs attended the University of Arkansas, where he played college baseball for the Arkansas Razorbacks. He has previously coached in MLB for the Minnesota Twins.

== Playing career ==
=== Amateur ===
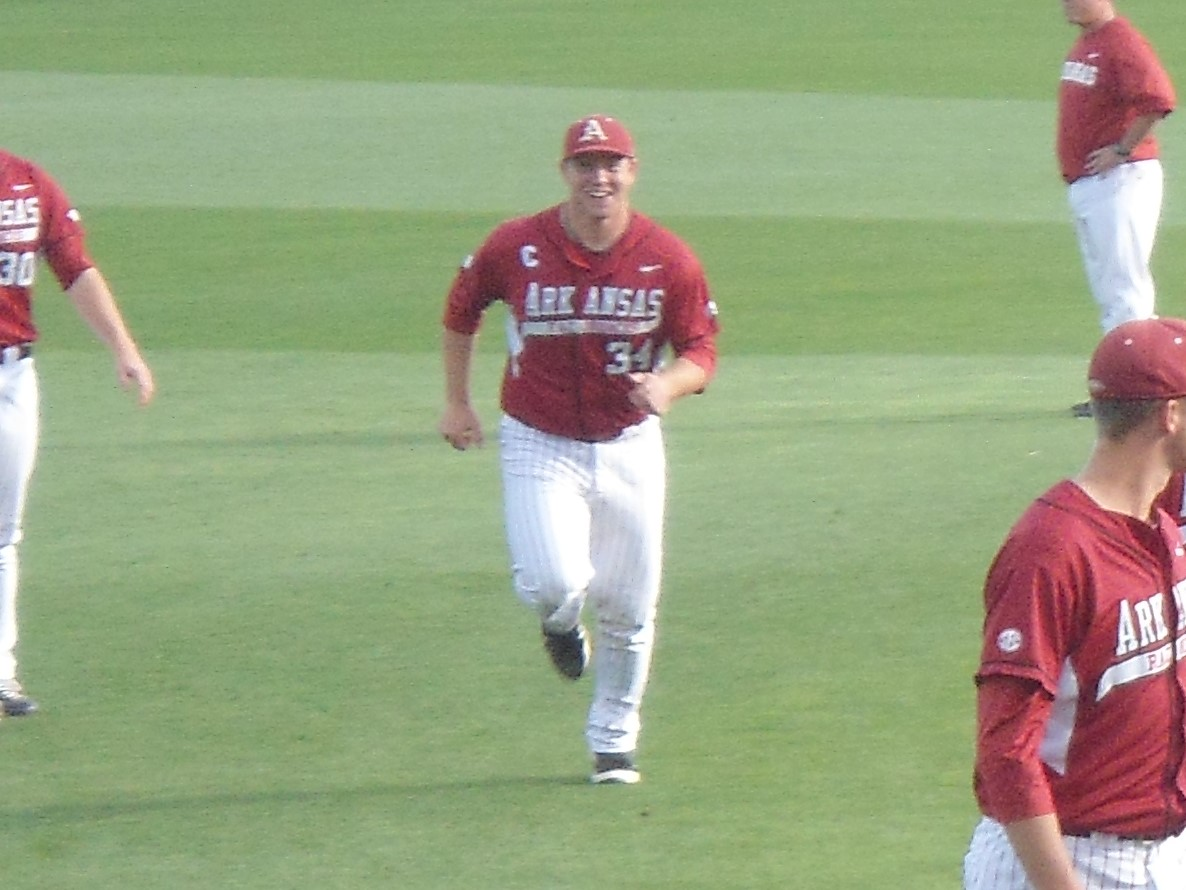
Suggs warming up while at Arkansas

Suggs attended Sulphur Springs High School in Sulphur Springs, Texas, and played for the school's baseball and American football teams. In football, he played center for the school's 2008 Class 4A Division 2 state championship team. He was not selected in the Major League Baseball draft after graduating from high school, so he enrolled at the University of Arkansas to play college baseball for the Arkansas Razorbacks baseball team. Suggs pitched in relief for the Razorbacks. In 2012, he played collegiate summer baseball with the Wareham Gatemen of the Cape Cod Baseball League and was named a league all-star. In 2013, Suggs recorded 13 saves for Arkansas, a Razorbacks record.

=== Miami Marlins ===
The Miami Marlins selected Suggs in the second round, with the 73rd overall selection, of the 2013 MLB draft. He signed and spent 2013 with the rookie-level Gulf Coast League Marlins, Low-A Batavia Muckdogs, and High-A Jupiter Hammerheads, posting a 2–3 record and 3.29 ERA with 38 strikeouts in 27 1/3 total relief innings pitched between the three affiliates.

Suggs spent the entirety of the 2014 campaign with High-A Jupiter, where he was 1–6 with a 5.09 ERA, 47 strikeouts, and three saves over 26 appearances out of the bullpen. He spent 2015 with the Single-A Greensboro Grasshoppers, where he made five scoreless appearances due to injury. Suggs pitched only 5 2/3 innings in 2016 while on a rehab assignment with the GCL Marlins. Suggs was released by the Marlins organization on July 19, 2016.

== Coaching career ==
Suggs served as the bullpen coach for the Arkansas Razorbacks in 2018 and joined the Minnesota Twins organization in 2019 as an advance scout. On July 1, 2022, the Twins promoted Suggs to the major leagues as their bullpen coach. On November 7, 2025, the Twins hired LaTroy Hawkins as the team's bullpen coach, replacing Suggs.

Suggs was hired by the Texas Rangers as their bullpen coach prior to the 2026 season.
