= Cole Sands =

American baseball player (born 1997)

Minnesota Twins – No. 44
- Pitcher
- Born: July 17, 1997 (age 29); Tallahassee, Florida, U.S.
- Bats: Right Throws: Right

MLB debut
- May 1, 2022, for the Minnesota Twins

MLB statistics (through 2026 season)
- Win–loss record: 14–11
- Earned run average: 4.42
- Strikeouts: 209
- Stats at Baseball Reference

Teams
- Minnesota Twins (2022–present)

Bryson Cole Sands (born July 17, 1997) is an American professional baseball pitcher for the Minnesota Twins of Major League Baseball (MLB). He made his MLB debut in 2022.

== Amateur career ==
Sands attended North Florida Christian School in Tallahassee, Florida, where he played baseball. As a senior, he pitched to a 0.32 ERA. Following his senior year, he was drafted by the Houston Astros in the 22nd round of the 2015 Major League Baseball draft, but he did not sign, and instead enrolled at Florida State University (FSU) where he played college baseball.

In 2016, as a freshman at FSU, Sands appeared in 18 games (17 starts) in which he pitched to a 6–7 record with a 4.13 ERA over 69 2/3 innings. As a sophomore at FSU, Sands once again pitched in 18 games (making 17 starts), going 6–4 with a 5.40 ERA. In 2016 and 2017, he played collegiate summer baseball for the Falmouth Commodores of the Cape Cod Baseball League. In 2018, his junior season, he made 14 starts and compiled a 7–4 record with a 4.54 ERA, striking out 88 over 75 innings. After the season, he was selected by the Minnesota Twins in the fifth round of the 2018 Major League Baseball draft. He signed for $600,000.

== Professional career ==
Sands made his professional debut in 2019 with the Cedar Rapids Kernels of the Single–A Midwest League. After eight starts, he was promoted to the Fort Myers Miracle of the High–A Florida State League. After nine starts with the Miracle, he earned another promotion, this time to the Pensacola Blue Wahoos of the Double–A Southern League. Over 18 starts between the three clubs, Sands went 7–3 with a 2.68 ERA, striking out 108 over 97 1/3 innings. He did not play a minor league game in 2020 since the season was cancelled due to the COVID-19 pandemic. For the 2021 season, Sands was assigned to the Wichita Wind Surge of the Double-A Central. On June 22, he was placed on the injured list with an undisclosed injury, and was activated on July 14. Over 19 games (18 starts) for the 2021 season, Sands went 4–2 with a 2.46 ERA and 96 strikeouts over 80 1/3 innings.

On November 19, 2021, the Twins selected Sands' contract and added him to their 40-man roster to protect him from the Rule 5 draft. He was assigned to the St. Paul Saints of the Triple-A International League to begin the 2022 season. On April 30, Sands was called up to the major leagues for the first time. He made his MLB debut on May 1, giving up two runs on three hits and two strikeouts over two innings pitched in relief; he was subsequently optioned to St. Paul after the game. On October 5, Sands allowed one run in four innings of relief in a 10–1 victory over the Chicago White Sox to earn his first career save. He appeared in 11 games for the Twins and pitched to a 5.87 ERA over 30 2/3 innings. He also appeared in 19 games for St. Paul and went 3-6 with a 5.55 ERA.

In 2023, Sands appeared in 15 games for the Twins and posted a 3.74 ERA over 21 2/3 innings. With St. Paul, he pitched in 19 games and went 0-2 with a 1.47 ERA.

Sands played the entirety of the 2024 season with the Twins. He appeared in 62 games in relief and went 9-1 with a 3.28 ERA and 85 strikeouts across 71 1/3 innings alongside converting 4 of 7 save opportunities. In 2025, Sands pitched in 69 games for the Twins with three starts. He pitched to a 4.50 ERA, 64 strikeouts, and three saves and 72 innings.

Prior to the 2026 season, Sands and the Twins agreed on a one-year deal worth $1.1 million, avoiding salary arbitration. He was placed on the injured list on May 2, 2026, with a right forearm strain. He missed close to three months before he was activated on July 26. Sands made 13 total appearances for Minnesota, struggling to an 8.25 ERA with 11 strikeouts and one save. On July 30, it was announced that Sands would require surgery to remove loose bodies and bone spurs from his right elbow, as well as a platelet-rich plasma injection.
