= Simeon Woods Richardson =

American baseball player (born 2000)

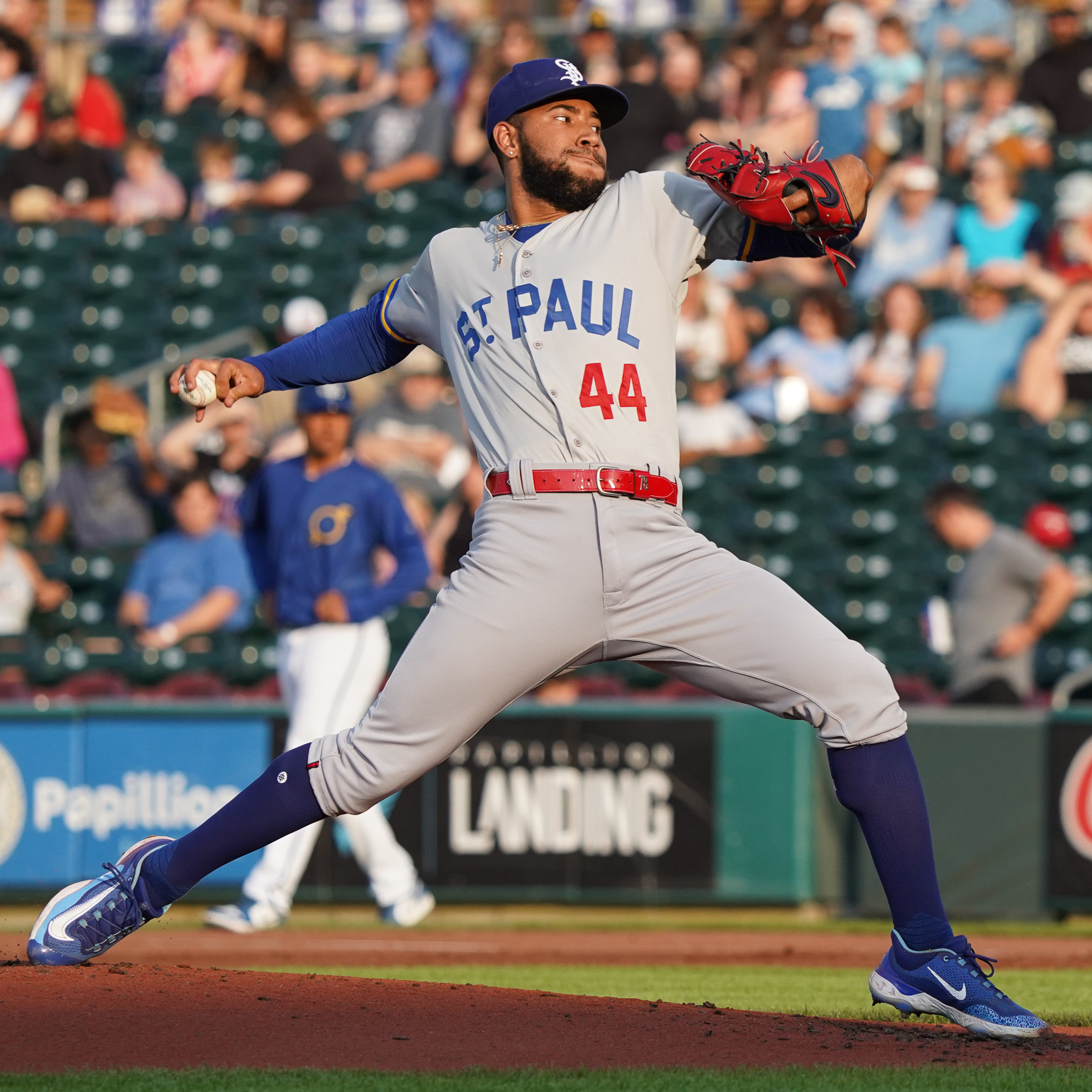
- Woods Richardson with the St. Paul Saints in 2023

Free agent
- Pitcher
- Born: September 27, 2000 (age 26); Sugar Land, Texas, U.S.
- Bats: Right Throws: Right

MLB debut
- October 2, 2022, for the Minnesota Twins

MLB statistics (through 2026 season)
- Win–loss record: 14–17
- Earned run average: 4.72
- Strikeouts: 272
- Stats at Baseball Reference

Teams
- Minnesota Twins (2022–2026); Toronto Blue Jays (2026)
Medals
Men's baseball
Representing United States
Olympic Games
Silver medal – second place	2020 Tokyo	Team

Simeon Woods Richardson (born September 27, 2000) is an American professional baseball pitcher who is a free agent. He has previously played in Major League Baseball (MLB) for the Minnesota Twins and Toronto Blue Jays. He played for the United States national baseball team in the 2020 Summer Olympics.

== Amateur career ==
Woods Richardson attended Kempner High School in Sugar Land, Texas. He committed to attend the University of Texas at Austin to play college baseball. The New York Mets selected Woods Richardson in the second round of the 2018 Major League Baseball draft with the 48th overall selection.

== Professional career ==
=== New York Mets ===
Woods Richardson was assigned to the Rookie-level Gulf Coast League Mets, and later promoted to the Rookie Advanced Kingsport Mets, and posted a 1–0 win–loss record, 1.56 earned run average (ERA), and 26 strikeouts in 17 1/3 innings pitched. He began the 2019 season with the Class-A Columbia Fireflies of the South Atlantic League. He was promoted to the Advanced-A St. Lucie Mets of the Florida State League (FSL) in July 2019.

=== Toronto Blue Jays ===
Before Woods Richardson could report to St. Lucie, the Mets traded him and Anthony Kay to the Toronto Blue Jays in exchange for Marcus Stroman. The Blue Jays assigned Woods Richardson to the High-A Dunedin Blue Jays following the trade. Over 26 starts between Columbia and Dunedin, Woods Richardson pitched to a 6–10 record, 3.80 ERA, and 126 strikeouts in 106 2/3 innings. He did not play in a game in 2020 due to the cancellation of the minor league season because of the COVID-19 pandemic.

Woods Richardson opened the 2021 season with the New Hampshire Fisher Cats of the Double-A Northeast. In 11 starts for New Hampshire, he compiled a 2-4 record and 5.76 ERA with 67 strikeouts across 45 1/3 innings pitched.

=== Minnesota Twins ===
On July 30, 2021, Woods Richardson was traded to the Minnesota Twins along with Austin Martin in exchange for José Berríos. He was assigned to the Wichita Wind Surge of the Double-A Central. Over 15 games (14 starts) between the two teams, he went 3–5 with a 5.91 ERA, 77 strikeouts, and 34 walks over 53 1/3 innings. He opened the 2022 season back with Wichita, and the Twins promoted Woods Richardson to the St. Paul Saints of the Triple-A International League in August.

On October 2, 2022, Woods Richardson was promoted to the major leagues for the first time. He made his MLB debut for the Twins the same day against the Detroit Tigers. Upon his debut, Woods Richardson surpassed seven players for the longest last name in MLB history with 15 characters. This was surpassed on July 17, 2023, by Christian Encarnacion-Strand of the Cincinnati Reds, setting the new mark at 17 characters.

Woods Richardson was optioned to Triple-A St. Paul to begin the 2023 season. He made only one appearance for Minnesota, allowing five runs on seven hits with five strikeouts across 4 2/3 innings of work. Woods Richardson was again optioned to Triple–A St. Paul to begin the 2024 season.

On April 13, 2024, Woods Richardson was recalled as the 27th man in a doubleheader against the Detroit Tigers, during which he earned his first career win. He was optioned back to St. Paul the following day. On April 25, Woods Richardson was again recalled to the Twins. He made 28 starts for Minnesota during the regular season, compiling a 5–5 record and 4.17 ERA with 117 strikeouts across 133 2/3 innings pitched. Woods Richardson logged 23 appearances (22 starts) for the Twins during the 2025 campaign, posting a 7–4 record and 4.04 ERA with 107 strikeouts over 111 1/3 innings of work.

Woods Richardson made 12 appearances (10 starts) for Minnesota to begin the 2026 campaign, but struggled to an 0–7 record and 7.74 ERA with 26 strikeouts across 47 2/3 innings pitched. On May 30, 2026, Woods Richardson was designated for assignment by the Twins.

=== Toronto Blue Jays (second stint) ===
On June 3, 2026, Woods Richardson was traded back to the Toronto Blue Jays in exchange for cash considerations. On June 8, he made his Blue Jays debut and pitched four scoreless innings with one hit allowed against the Philadelphia Phillies. He cleared waivers and was sent outright to the Triple-A Buffalo Bisons on June 30. On August 10, the Blue Jays added Woods Richardson back to their active roster. He made eight total appearances for Toronto, logging a 2–0 record and 3.93 ERA with 14 strikeouts across 18 1/3 innings pitched. Woods Richardson was designated for assignment by the Blue Jays on August 28. He cleared waivers and was again sent outright to Triple–A Buffalo on August 31. Woods Richardson subsequently rejected the assignment and elected free agency the next day.

=== Seattle Mariners ===
On September 2, 2026, Woods Richardson signed a minor league contract with the Seattle Mariners. In 3 starts with Triple-A Tacoma Rainiers he threw 9.1 innings going 0-0 with a 2.89 ERA and 8 strikeouts. He elected free agency on November 2.

== International career ==
In May 2021, Woods Richardson was named to the roster of the United States national baseball team for qualifying for baseball at the 2020 Summer Olympics. After the team qualified, he was named to the Olympics roster on July 2. The team went on to win silver, falling to Japan in the gold-medal game.
