= Toby Gardenhire =

American baseball player and manager (born 1982)

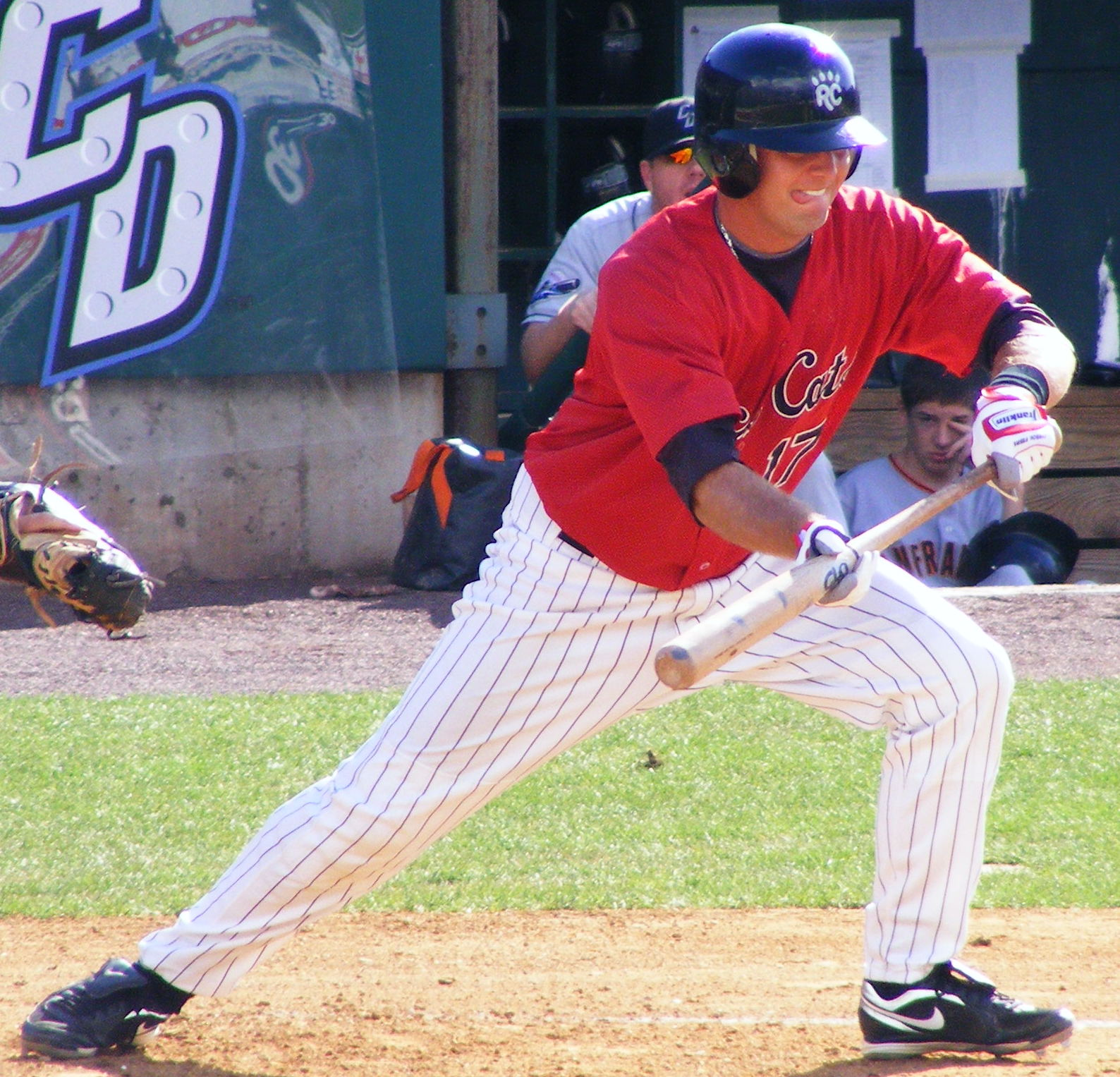
- Gardnehire with the New Britain Rock Cats in 2006

Minnesota Twins – No. 66
- Shortstop / Manager / Coach
- Born: September 11, 1982 (age 43); Manhasset, New York, U.S.
- Bats: Right Throws: Right

Teams
- New Britain Rock Cats (player; 2009, 2011); Rochester Red Wings (player; 2010, 2011); University of Wisconsin-Stout (coach; 2012–2015); St. Paul Saints (Manager; 2021–2025); Minnesota Twins (Field Coordinator; 2025–present)

Career highlights and awards
- FSL Coach of the Year 2019

Toby Joel Gardenhire (born September 11, 1982) is an American professional baseball manager and former shortstop who currently serves as the field coordinator for the Minnesota Twins of Major League Baseball (MLB). The son of Ron Gardenhire, Toby grew up around baseball and was drafted by the Twins.

After spending time in the minor leagues, he retired from playing and began a coaching and managing career. He was the manager of the Twins-affiliated St. Paul Saints beginning in 2021. He was hired as the Field Coordinator for the Minnesota Twins in 2025 under new manager Derek Shelton.

== Early life ==
Toby Joel Gardenhire was born on September 11, 1982, in Manhasset, New York. He is the son of former MLB player, coach, and manager Ron Gardenhire and Carol Gardenhire. Growing up, the Gardenhire family lived in Kansas. However, for part of the year they would live wherever Ron was managing. As such, Toby would occasionally attend Roseville Area High School, where he once played against Cretin-Derham Hall and Joe Mauer at Midway Stadium.

Gardenhire was originally selected by the Minnesota Twins in the 38th round of the 2002 Major League Baseball draft, but instead chose to attend the University of Illinois, playing for their baseball team.

== Playing career ==
Toby Gardenhire was again drafted by the Minnesota Twins in the 41st round of the 2005 Major League Baseball draft, spending most of his time as a utility player, and playing for the New Britain Rock Cats and the Triple-A Rochester Red Wings. Like his father, Toby was known more for his glove than his bat. After hitting .247 in 103 games at Rochester in 2011, Toby finished with a career line of .232/.291/.274, with six home runs, in 533 minor league games, while seeing playing time at all nine defensive positions, including 2 2/3 innings as a pitcher.

== Coaching career ==
In 2012, Gardenhire became the head coach for the University of Wisconsin-Stout baseball team. He joined the Twins system in 2016, spending time with the Rochester Red Wings and the Cedar Rapids Kernels on the coaching staff. He became the manager of the Kernels in 2018. In 2019, he managed the Fort Myers Miracle, for which he received the Florida State League Coach of the Year award. In his first two years managing, his record was 151–121. From 2021 to 2025, Toby managed the Twins' Triple-A affiliate, the St. Paul Saints.

On November 14, 2025, Gardenhire was hired to serve as the field coordinator for the Minnesota Twins.

== Personal life ==
Gardenhire competes in a bowling league in West Saint Paul. He and his wife Sara have a son, Bodie.

== Managerial record ==
Team	Year	Regular season					Postseason	
Team	Year	Games	Won	Lost	Win %	Finish	Won	Lost
Cedar Rapids Kernels	2018	139	77	62	.554	4th	?	?
Fort Myers Miracle	2019	133	74	59	.556	3rd	–	–
St. Paul Saints	2021	120	61	59	.508	10th	6	4
St. Paul Saints	2022	150	74	76	.493	10th (tie)	–	–
St. Paul Saints	2023	150	84	64	.568	3rd	–	–
St. Paul Saints	2024	149	70	79	.470	13th	–	–
Saints total		567	289	278	.510			
Total		839	440	399	.524			
