= Edouard Julien =

Canadian baseball player (born 1999)

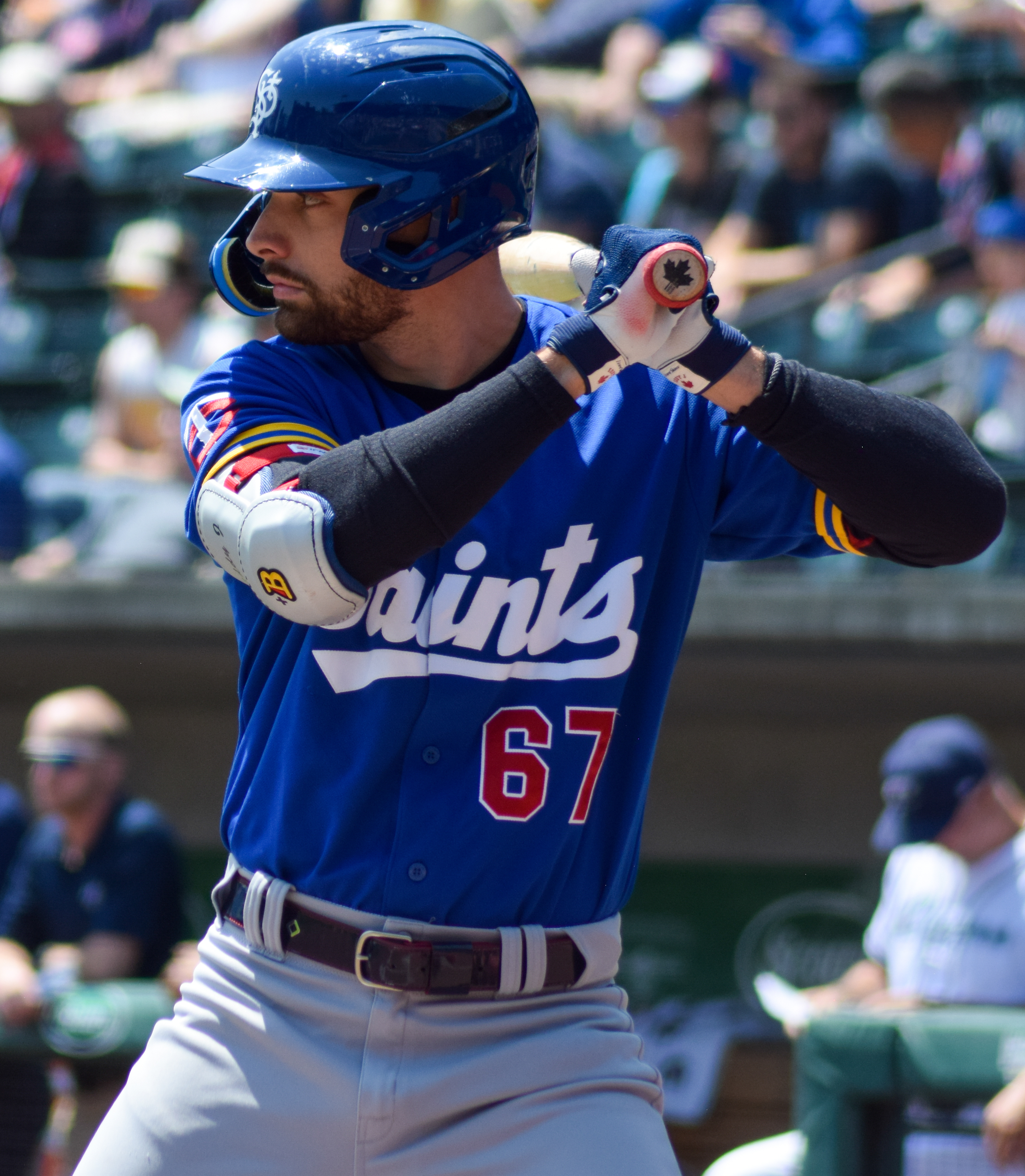
- Julien with the St. Paul Saints in 2023

Free agent
- Second baseman
- Born: April 30, 1999 (age 27); Quebec City, Quebec, Canada
- Bats: Left Throws: Right

MLB debut
- April 12, 2023, for the Minnesota Twins

MLB statistics (through 2026 season)
- Batting average: .226
- Home runs: 30
- Runs batted in: 90
- Stats at Baseball Reference

Teams
- Minnesota Twins (2023–2025); Colorado Rockies (2026)

Edouard Julien (born April 30, 1999) is a Canadian professional baseball second baseman who is a free agent. He has previously played in Major League Baseball (MLB) for the Minnesota Twins and Colorado Rockies. Julien played for the Canadian national team in the 2023 World Baseball Classic.

== Professional career ==
=== Minnesota Twins ===
Julien attended Cardinal-Roy Secondary School in Quebec City, Canada. The Philadelphia Phillies selected Julien in the 37th round of the 2017 Major League Baseball draft. He did not sign with the Phillies and enrolled at Auburn University to play college baseball for the Auburn Tigers. When he arrived at Auburn, he could not speak English. In 2018, he played collegiate summer baseball with the Falmouth Commodores of the Cape Cod Baseball League, and returned to the league in 2019 with the Hyannis Harbor Hawks. After his sophomore year, the Minnesota Twins selected Julien in the 18th round of the 2019 MLB draft. Though he initially planned to return to Auburn for his junior year, the Twins increased their signing bonus offer to $493,000 and he signed.

Because of surgery and the COVID-19 pandemic, Julien didn't make his professional debut until 2021 with the Fort Myers Mighty Mussels. During the season he was promoted to the Cedar Rapids Kernels. He spent the 2022 season with the Wichita Wind Surge. He played in the 2022 Arizona Fall League, where he batted .365/.535/.683, and led the league in runs (21) and walks (20). On November 15, 2022, the Twins added Julien to their 40-man roster to protect him from the Rule 5 draft.

The Twins optioned Julien to the Triple-A St. Paul Saints to begin the 2023 season. After starting the season batting 9-for-29 (.276), the Twins promoted him to the major leagues on April 12. Julien got his first major league hit and first home run in the same inning against the New York Yankees on April 13. He finished his rookie season with a .263/.381/.459 slash line, 16 home runs, 37 RBI, and 16 doubles. Julien received two votes in American League Rookie of the Year voting, finishing in seventh place.

Julien played in 94 games for Minnesota in 2024, slashing .199/.292/.323 with eight home runs, 21 RBI, and six stolen bases. He made 64 appearances for the Twins during the 2025 campaign, batting .220/.309/.324 with three home runs and 12 RBI.

=== Colorado Rockies ===
On January 28, 2026, Julien and Pierson Ohl were traded to the Colorado Rockies in exchange for Jace Kaminska and cash considerations. In 88 appearances for Colorado, he posted a .208/.322/.292 batting line with three home runs, 20 RBI, and five stolen bases. Julien was designated for assignment by the Rockies on August 11. He cleared waivers and was sent outright to the Triple–A Albuquerque Isotopes on August 13. He elected free agency on November 2.

== International career ==
Julien represents the Canadian national baseball team in international competition. In 2019, he played for Team Canada at the 2019 Pan American Games winning a silver medal. During the games, he suffered an injury which required him to later on undergo Tommy John surgery.

Julien was selected to the Canadian roster for the 2023 World Baseball Classic. He finished as the tournament's statistical leader in slugging percentage (1.154) and OPS (1.821). Julien homered on the first pitch of his first plate appearance in the tournament off Great Britain's Akeel Morris. However, despite convincing victories over Great Britain and Colombia, Canada was eliminated in pool play.

== Personal life ==
In August 2018, Julien was arrested in Auburn, Alabama, for public intoxication and criminal littering. He was sentenced to perform community service.
