= Kody Funderburk =

American baseball player (born 1996)

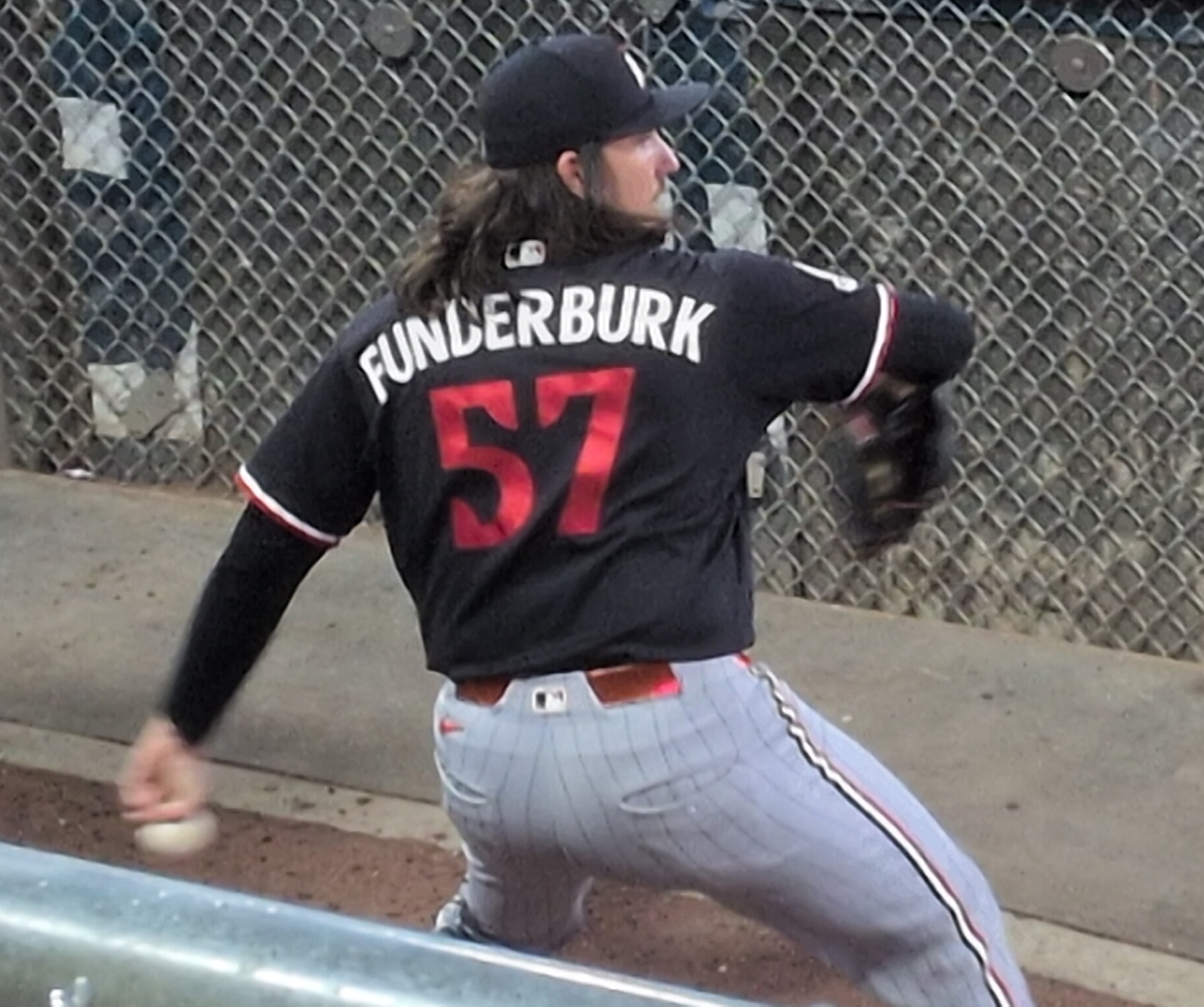
- Funderburk with the Minnesota Twins in 2026

Minnesota Twins – No. 57
- Pitcher
- Born: November 27, 1996 (age 29); Mesa, Arizona, U.S.
- Bats: Left Throws: Left

MLB debut
- August 28, 2023, for the Minnesota Twins

MLB statistics (through 2026 season)
- Win–loss record: 10–3
- Earned run average: 4.09
- Strikeouts: 140
- Stats at Baseball Reference

Teams
- Minnesota Twins (2023–present)

Kody Funderburk (born November 27, 1996) is an American professional baseball pitcher for the Minnesota Twins of Major League Baseball (MLB). He made his MLB debut in 2023.

== Amateur career ==
Funderburk graduated from Queen Creek High School in Queen Creek, Arizona. He began his college baseball career at Mesa Community College. He then transferred to Dallas Baptist University.

== Professional career ==
The Minnesota Twins drafted Funderburk in the 15th round, with the 454th overall selection, of the 2018 Major League Baseball draft. He made his professional debut with the rookie–level Elizabethton Twins, recording a 4.93 ERA in 10 games. Funderburk spent the 2019 season with the Single–A Cedar Rapids Kernels, also appearing in one game for the High–A Fort Myers Miracle. In 12 games (10 starts) for Fort Myers, he posted a 4.68 ERA with 55 strikeouts in 50 innings pitched.

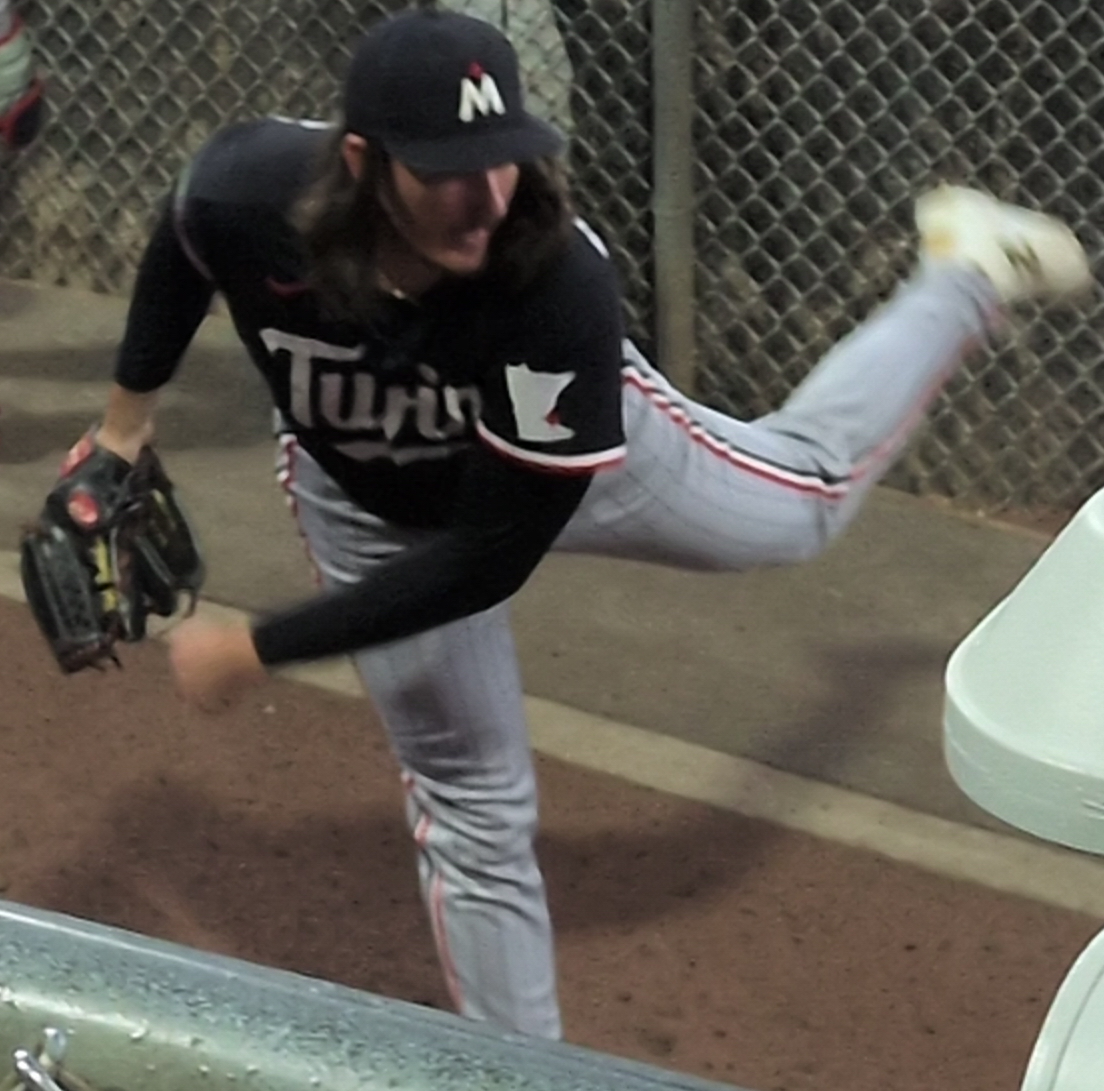
Funderburk throwing a pitch while practicing at Sutter Health Park in 2026

Funderburk did not play in a game in 2020 due to the cancellation of the minor league season because of the COVID-19 pandemic. He returned to action in 2021, splitting the year between Cedar Rapids and the Double–A Wichita Wind Surge. In 18 games (10 starts) split between the two affiliates, Funderburk combined to a 4–3 record and 2.55 ERA with 82 strikeouts and 4 saves in 67 innings pitched. He spent the entire 2022 season back in Wichita, registering a 10–5 record and 2.94 ERA with 103 strikeouts in 107 innings of work.

Funderburk began the 2023 season with Double–A Wichita, and was promoted to the Triple–A St. Paul Saints after 5 games. In 37 appearances for the Saints, he registered a 2.60 ERA with 75 strikeouts and 5 saves in 52 innings of work.

On August 28, 2023, Funderburk was selected to the 40-man roster and promoted to the major leagues for the first time. He made his MLB debut the same day and earned his first win after pitching two perfect innings in relief of Kenta Maeda in a 10–6 home victory over the Cleveland Guardians.

Funderburk started the 2024 season on the Opening Day roster before getting optioned multiple times. In 26 appearances for Minnesota, he logged a 5.61 ERA with 31 strikeouts over 33 2/3 innings pitched. On July 21, 2024, the Twins placed Funderburk on the 15-day injured list with a left oblique strain, and was later moved to the 60-day injured list on September 5. He was activated on September 27.

Funderburk was optioned to Triple-A St. Paul to begin the 2025 season.
