= Dave St. Peter =

American sports executive

David Saint Peter (born January 3, 1967, in Bismarck, North Dakota) served as president of the Minnesota Twins of Major League Baseball from 2002 until 2025.

St. Peter was born in Bismarck, North Dakota, and attended St. Mary's Central High School in Bismarck and the University of North Dakota. He joined the Twins organization in 1990.

On March 3, 2025, St. Peter stepped down as president of the Twins and transitioned into a role as strategic advisor.
