= 2026 Minnesota Twins season =

2026 Minnesota Twins
- League: American League
- Division: Central
- Ballpark: Target Field
- City: Minneapolis, Minnesota
- Record: 77–85 (.475)
- Divisional place: 3rd
- Owner: Jim Pohlad
- President: Dave St. Peter
- General manager: Jeremy Zoll
- Manager: Derek Shelton
- Television: MLB Local Media
- Radio: WCCO
- Stats: ESPN.com; Baseball Reference

The 2026 Minnesota Twins season was the 66th season for the Minnesota Twins franchise in the Twin Cities of Minnesota, their 17th season at Target Field, and the 128th overall in the American League.

This is the first season without manager Rocco Baldelli, who was fired on September 29 after seven seasons, finishing 2025 with a 70–92 record and an overall managerial record of 527–505, which is third all time in wins for the Twins behind only World Series-winning manager Tom Kelly and Ron Gardenhire. Derek Shelton was hired in October to replace Baldelli.

The Twins improved on their 70-92 record from 2025, despite this, they suffered their second straight losing season and were eliminated from playoff contention on September 20.

== Season standings ==
=== American League Central ===
AL Central
| Team | W | L | Pct. | GB | Home | Road |
|---|---|---|---|---|---|---|
| Cleveland Guardians | 85 | 77 | .525 | — | 41‍–‍40 | 44‍–‍37 |
| Chicago White Sox | 84 | 78 | .519 | 1 | 48‍–‍33 | 36‍–‍45 |
| Minnesota Twins | 77 | 85 | .475 | 8 | 42‍–‍39 | 35‍–‍46 |
| Detroit Tigers | 76 | 86 | .469 | 9 | 42‍–‍39 | 34‍–‍47 |
| Kansas City Royals | 69 | 93 | .426 | 16 | 41‍–‍40 | 28‍–‍53 |

=== American League Wild Card ===
Division leaders
| Team | W | L | Pct. |
|---|---|---|---|
| Tampa Bay Rays | 98 | 64 | .605 |
| Cleveland Guardians | 85 | 77 | .525 |
| Houston Astros | 81 | 81 | .500 |

Wild Card teams (Top 3 teams qualify for postseason)
| Team | W | L | Pct. | GB |
|---|---|---|---|---|
| New York Yankees | 93 | 68 | .578 | +9½ |
| Boston Red Sox | 87 | 75 | .537 | +3 |
| Chicago White Sox | 84 | 78 | .519 | — |
| Texas Rangers | 80 | 82 | .494 | 4 |
| Baltimore Orioles | 79 | 82 | .491 | 4½ |
| Toronto Blue Jays | 79 | 83 | .488 | 5 |
| Minnesota Twins | 77 | 85 | .475 | 7 |
| Detroit Tigers | 76 | 86 | .469 | 8 |
| Seattle Mariners | 76 | 86 | .469 | 8 |
| Kansas City Royals | 69 | 93 | .426 | 15 |
| Athletics | 64 | 98 | .395 | 20 |
| Los Angeles Angels | 62 | 100 | .383 | 22 |

=== Records vs. AL Opponents ===
2026 American League record Source: MLB Standings Grid – 2026
| Team | ATH | BAL | BOS | CWS | CLE | DET | HOU | KC | LAA | MIN | NYY | SEA | TB | TEX | TOR | NL |
|---|---|---|---|---|---|---|---|---|---|---|---|---|---|---|---|---|
| Athletics | — | 2–4 | 3–4 | 1–5 | 1–5 | 0–6 | 6–7 | 2–5 | 8–5 | 3–3 | 3–3 | 7–6 | 0–6 | 7–6 | 2–4 | 19–29 |
| Baltimore | 4–2 | — | 4–9 | 4–2 | 3–4 | 4–2 | 5–1 | 5–1 | 3–3 | 3–3 | 3–9 | 3–4 | 8–5 | 2–4 | 7–6 | 21–27 |
| Boston | 4–3 | 9–4 | — | 6–0 | 3–3 | 5–2 | 1–5 | 5–1 | 4–2 | 1–5 | 6–7 | 3–3 | 6–7 | 3–3 | 4–9 | 27–21 |
| Chicago | 5–1 | 2–4 | 0–6 | — | 7–6 | 9–4 | 2–5 | 9–4 | 4–2 | 8–5 | 3–4 | 3–3 | 2–4 | 4–2 | 5–1 | 21–27 |
| Cleveland | 5–1 | 4–3 | 3–3 | 6–7 | — | 10–3 | 2–4 | 7–6 | 6–0 | 6–7 | 2–4 | 4–3 | 1–5 | 2–4 | 2–4 | 25–23 |
| Detroit | 6–0 | 2–4 | 2–5 | 4–9 | 3–10 | — | 2–5 | 6–7 | 3–3 | 5–8 | 4–2 | 4–2 | 4–2 | 4–2 | 3–3 | 24–24 |
| Houston | 7–6 | 1–5 | 5–1 | 5–2 | 4–2 | 5–2 | — | 4–2 | 7–6 | 2–4 | 3–3 | 3–10 | 2–4 | 9–4 | 3–3 | 21–27 |
| Kansas City | 5–2 | 1–5 | 1–5 | 4–9 | 6–7 | 7–6 | 2–4 | — | 5–1 | 8–5 | 0–6 | 5–1 | 2–5 | 1–5 | 3–3 | 19–29 |
| Los Angeles | 5–8 | 3–3 | 2–4 | 2–4 | 0–6 | 3–3 | 6–7 | 1–5 | — | 3–4 | 3–4 | 6–7 | 3–3 | 8–5 | 2–4 | 15–33 |
| Minnesota | 3–3 | 3–3 | 5–1 | 5–8 | 7–6 | 8–5 | 4–2 | 5–8 | 4–3 | — | 3–3 | 2–4 | 1–5 | 5–1 | 4–3 | 18–30 |
| New York | 3–3 | 9–3 | 7–6 | 4–3 | 4–2 | 2–4 | 3–3 | 6–0 | 4–3 | 3–3 | — | 4–2 | 6–7 | 4–2 | 7–6 | 27–21 |
| Seattle | 6–7 | 4–3 | 3–3 | 3–3 | 3–4 | 2–4 | 10–3 | 1–5 | 7–6 | 4–2 | 2–4 | — | 1–5 | 5–8 | 2–4 | 23–25 |
| Tampa Bay | 6–0 | 5–8 | 7–6 | 4–2 | 5–1 | 2–4 | 4–2 | 5–2 | 3–3 | 5–1 | 7–6 | 5–1 | — | 4–3 | 9–4 | 27–21 |
| Texas | 6–7 | 4–2 | 3–3 | 2–4 | 4–2 | 2–4 | 4–9 | 5–1 | 5–8 | 1–5 | 2–4 | 8–5 | 3–4 | — | 6–1 | 25–23 |
| Toronto | 4–2 | 6–7 | 9–4 | 1–5 | 4–2 | 3–3 | 3–3 | 3–3 | 4–2 | 3–4 | 6–7 | 4–2 | 4–9 | 1–6 | — | 24–24 |

Updated with the results of all games through September 27, 2026.

== Game log ==
Legend
| | Twins win |
| | Twins loss |
| | Postponement |
| | Eliminated from playoff race |
| **Bold** | Twins team member |

2026 Game Log: 77–85 (Home: 42–39; Road: 35–46)
March/April: 14–18 (Home: 9–8; Road: 5–10)

| # | Date | Opponent | Score | Win | Loss | Save | Attendance | Record | Streak |
|---|---|---|---|---|---|---|---|---|---|
| 1 | March 26 | @ Orioles | 1–2 | Rogers (1–0) | **Funderburk** (0–1) | Helsley (1) | 42,134 | 0–1 | L1 |
| 2 | March 28 | @ Orioles | 4–1 | **Banda** (1–0) | Bradish (0–1) | **Sands** (1) | 26,057 | 1–1 | W1 |
| 3 | March 29 | @ Orioles | 6–8 | Garcia (1–0) | **Abel** (0–1) | Helsley (2) | 18,071 | 1–2 | L1 |
| 4 | March 30 | @ Royals | 1–3 | Bubic (1–0) | **Woods Richardson** (0–1) | Schreiber (1) | 39,320 | 1–3 | L2 |
| 5 | April 1 | @ Royals | 9–13 | Cameron (1–0) | **Ryan** (0–1) | Erceg (2) | 10,870 | 1–4 | L3 |
| 6 | April 2 | @ Royals | 5–1 | **Bradley** (1–0) | Ragans (0–2) | ― | 11,694 | 2–4 | W1 |
| 7 | April 3 | Rays | 10–4 | **Funderburk** (1–1) | Kelly (0–1) | — | 36,042 | 3–4 | W2 |
| 8 | April 4 | Rays | 1–7 | Matz (2–0) | **Abel** (0–2) | ― | 15,256 | 3–5 | L1 |
| 9 | April 5 | Rays | 1–4 (10) | Baker (1–0) | **Topa** (0–1) | Kelly (2) | 13,069 | 3–6 | L2 |
| 10 | April 6 | Tigers | 7–3 | **Ryan** (1–1) | Mize (0–1) | **Laweryson** (1) | 12,569 | 4–6 | W1 |
| 11 | April 7 | Tigers | 4–2 | **Bradley** (2–0) | Skubal (1–2) | **Topa** (1) | 12,341 | 5–6 | W2 |
| 12 | April 8 | Tigers | 8–6 | **Ober** (1–0) | Valdez (1–1) | **Funderburk** (1) | 13,038 | 6–6 | W3 |
| 13 | April 9 | Tigers | 3–1 | **Acton** (1–0) | Vest (0–2) | **Orze** (1) | 19,054 | 7–6 | W4 |
| 14 | April 10 | @ Blue Jays | 4–10 | Mantiply (1–0) | **Woods Richardson** (0–2) | — | 40,721 | 7–7 | L1 |
| 15 | April 11 | @ Blue Jays | 7–4 | **Ryan** (2–1) | Lauer (1–2) | — | 41,591 | 8–7 | W1 |
| 16 | April 12 | @ Blue Jays | 8–2 | **Bradley** (3–0) | Scherzer (1–2) | — | 37,804 | 9–7 | W2 |
| 17 | April 13 | Red Sox | 13–6 | **Ober** (2–0) | Crochet (2–2) | — | 14,535 | 10–7 | W3 |
| 18 | April 14 | Red Sox | 6–0 | **Abel** (1–2) | Gray (2–1) | — | 16,220 | 11–7 | W4 |
| 19 | April 15 | Red Sox | 5–9 | Early (1–0) | **Woods Richardson** (0–3) | — | 21,276 | 11–8 | L1 |
| 20 | April 17 | Reds | 1–2 | Williamson (2–1) | **Ryan** (2–2) | Pagán (6) | 31,220 | 11–9 | L2 |
| 21 | April 18 | Reds | 4–5 | Nicolas (1–0) | **Sands** (0–1) | Santillan (1) | 20,198 | 11–10 | L3 |
| 22 | April 19 | Reds | 4–7 (10) | Pagán (2–0) | **Acton** (1–1) | Ashcraft (1) | 19,442 | 11–11 | L4 |
| 23 | April 21 | @ Mets | 5–3 | **Sands** (1–1) | Williams (0–1) | — | 32,798 | 12–11 | W1 |
| 24 | April 22 | @ Mets | 2–3 | Weaver (2–0) | **Rogers** (0–1) | — | 32,665 | 12–12 | L1 |
| 25 | April 23 | @ Mets | 8–10 | Williams (1–1) | **Morris** (0–1) | — | 34,253 | 12–13 | L2 |
| 26 | April 24 | @ Rays | 2–6 | Rasmussen (2–0) | **Bradley** (3–1) | Baker (5) | 14,476 | 12–14 | L3 |
| 27 | April 25 | @ Rays | 1–6 | McClanahan (2–2) | **Ober** (2–1) | — | 17,014 | 12–15 | L4 |
| 28 | April 26 | @ Rays | 2–4 | Scholtens (2–1) | **Woods Richardson** (0–4) | Baker (6) | 17,618 | 12–16 | L5 |
| 29 | April 27 | Mariners | 11–4 | **Prielipp** (1–0) | Castillo (0–2) | — | 14,160 | 13–16 | W1 |
| 30 | April 28 | Mariners | 1–7 | Bazardo (2–1) | **Ryan** (2–3) | — | 17,821 | 13–17 | L1 |
| 31 | April 29 | Mariners | 3–5 | Criswell (1–0) | **Orze** (0–1) | Muñoz (6) | 20,051 | 13–18 | L2 |
| 32 | April 30 | Blue Jays | 7–1 | **Ober** (3–1) | Gausman (2–2) | — | 16,985 | 14–18 | W1 |

May: 13–15 (Home: 6–6; Road: 7–9)

| # | Date | Opponent | Score | Win | Loss | Save | Attendance | Record | Streak |
|---|---|---|---|---|---|---|---|---|---|
| 33 | May 1 | Blue Jays | 3–7 | Corbin (1–0) | **Woods Richardson** (0–5) | — | 19,762 | 14–19 | L1 |
| 34 | May 2 | Blue Jays | 4–11 | Cease (2–1) | **García** (0–1) | — | 30,687 | 14–20 | L2 |
| 35 | May 3 | Blue Jays | 4–3 | **Morris** (1–1) | Yesavage (1–1) | **Topa** (2) | 20,394 | 15–20 | W1 |
| 36 | May 5 | @ Nationals | 11–3 | **Bradley** (4–1) | Cavalli (1–2) | — | 17,844 | 16–20 | W2 |
| 37 | May 6 | @ Nationals | 2–15 | Mikolas (1–3) | **Ober** (3–2) | — | 17,444 | 16–21 | L1 |
| 38 | May 7 | @ Nationals | 5–7 | Poulin (3–0) | **Klein** (0–1) | Varland (4) | 13,543 | 16–22 | L2 |
| 39 | May 8 | @ Guardians | 4–6 | Messick (4–1) | **Prielipp** (1–1) | Smith (11) | 19,030 | 16–23 | L3 |
| 40 | May 9 | @ Guardians | 2–1 (11) | **Orze** (1–1) | Pallette (1–2) | **García** (1) | 28,230 | 17–23 | W1 |
| 41 | May 10 | @ Guardians | 5–4 | **Rojas** (1–0) | Williams (5–3) | **Gómez** (2) | 22,475 | 18–23 | W2 |
| 42 | May 12 | Marlins | 3–0 | **Ober** (4–2) | Pérez (2–5) | — | 13,471 | 19–23 | W3 |
| 43 | May 13 | Marlins | 5–9 | Meyer (3–0) | **Woods Richardson** (0–6) | — | 14,005 | 19–24 | L1 |
| 44 | May 14 | Marlins | 9–1 | **Matthews** (1–0) | Garrett (0–1) | — | 20,702 | 20–24 | W1 |
| 45 | May 15 | Brewers | 2–3 | Ashby (8–0) | **Morris** (1–2) | Megill (5) | 24,309 | 20–25 | L1 |
| 46 | May 16 | Brewers | 1–2 | Henderson (1–1) | **Prielipp** (1–2) | Patrick (1) | 33,115 | 20–26 | L2 |
| 47 | May 17 | Brewers | 5–4 | **Ober** (5–2) | Anderson (1–2) | **García** (2) | 25,375 | 21–26 | W1 |
| 48 | May 18 | Astros | 6–3 | **Orze** (2–1) | Imai (1–2) | **Rogers** (1) | 11,488 | 22–26 | W2 |
| 49 | May 19 | Astros | 1–2 | Alexander (1–0) | **Matthews** (1–1) | Abreu (3) | 13,557 | 22–27 | L1 |
| 50 | May 20 | Astros | 4–1 | **Ryan** (3–3) | Burrows (2–6) | **Morris** (1) | 23,522 | 23–27 | W1 |
| 51 | May 22 | @ Red Sox | 8–6 | **Adams** (1–0) | Slaten (0–2) | **Banda** (1) | 34,740 | 24–27 | W2 |
| 52 | May 23 | @ Red Sox | 4–2 | **Bradley** (5–1) | Morán (0–2) | **Rogers** (2) | 37,105 | 25–27 | W3 |
| 53 | May 24 | @ Red Sox | 6–5 | **Ober** (6–2) | Guerrero (0–1) | **Adams** (1) | 31,050 | 26–27 | W4 |
| 54 | May 25 | @ White Sox | 1–3 | Kay (4–1) | **Matthews** (1–2) | Domínguez (11) | 30,114 | 26–28 | L1 |
| 55 | May 26 | @ White Sox | 5–3 (11) | **Rogers** (1–1) | Davis (2–2) | **Gómez** (3) | 15,432 | 27–28 | W1 |
| 56 | May 27 | @ White Sox | 2–15 | Sandlin (1–0) | **Prielipp** (1–3) | — | 14,796 | 27–29 | L1 |
| 57 | May 28 | @ White Sox | 2–6 | Martin (8–1) | **Woods Richardson** (0–7) | — | 14,194 | 27–30 | L2 |
| 58 | May 29 | @ Pirates | 5–6 | Soto (4–0) | **Rogers** (1–2) | — | 27,107 | 27–31 | L3 |
| 59 | May 30 | @ Pirates | 9–10 | Ramírez (3–2) | **Ober** (6–3) | Soto (7) | 24,272 | 27–32 | L4 |
| 60 | May 31 | @ Pirates | 3–9 | Ashcraft (5–2) | **Matthews** (1–3) | — | 19,358 | 27–33 | L5 |

June: 14–13 (Home: 7–9; Road: 7–4)

| # | Date | Opponent | Score | Win | Loss | Save | Attendance | Record | Streak |
|---|---|---|---|---|---|---|---|---|---|
| 61 | June 1 | White Sox | 9–6 | **Ryan** (4–3) | Sandlin (1–1) | — | 12,525 | 28–33 | W1 |
| 62 | June 2 | White Sox | 6–4 | **Prielipp** (2–3) | Martin (8–2) | **Gómez** (4) | 15,358 | 29–33 | W2 |
| 63 | June 3 | White Sox | 0–8 | Fedde (1–5) | **Bradley** (5–2) | — | 20,322 | 29–34 | L1 |
| 64 | June 4 | Royals | 6–8 | Strahm (2–1) | **Rogers** (1–3) | Lange (2) | 17,802 | 29–35 | L2 |
| 65 | June 5 | Royals | 5–3 | **Matthews** (2–3) | Wacha (4–4) | **Adams** (2) | 19,805 | 30–35 | W1 |
| 66 | June 6 | Royals | 2–3 | Strahm (3–1) | **Orze** (2–2) | Lange (3) | 20,555 | 30–36 | L1 |
| 67 | June 7 | Royals | 5–6 | Cameron (3–4) | **Prielipp** (2–4) | Erceg (12) | 19,876 | 30–37 | L2 |
| 68 | June 9 | @ Tigers | 4–10 | Melton (3–0) | **Bradley** (5–3) | — | 22,641 | 30–38 | L3 |
| 69 | June 10 | @ Tigers | 6–4 | **Rogers** (2–3) | Valdez (3–5) | **Gómez** (5) | 23,517 | 31–38 | W1 |
| 70 | June 11 | @ Tigers | 0–11 | Montero (3–4) | **Matthews** (2–4) | — | 30,714 | 31–39 | L1 |
| 71 | June 12 | Cardinals | 9–8 | **Banda** (2–0) | Stanek (2–1) | **Morris** (2) | 23,089 | 32–39 | W1 |
| 72 | June 13 | Cardinals | 6–9 | Svanson (2–1) | **Lawrence** (0–3) | — | 23,408 | 32–40 | L1 |
| 73 | June 14 | Cardinals | 5–4 | **Morris** (2–2) | Soriano (3–1) | **Gómez** (6) | 23,026 | 33–40 | W1 |
| 74 | June 15 | @ Rangers | 4–2 | **Rogers** (3–3) | Gore (4–6) | **Gómez** (7) | 25,957 | 34–40 | W2 |
| 75 | June 16 | @ Rangers | 12–2 | **Matthews** (3–4) | Rocker (2–6) | — | 27,463 | 35–40 | W3 |
| 76 | June 18 | @ Rangers | 9–3 | **Ryan** (5–3) | Leiter (3–7) | — | 30,606 | 36–40 | W4 |
| 77 | June 19 | @ Diamondbacks | 5–9 | Loáisiga (2–2) | **Prielipp** (2–5) | — | 25,110 | 36–41 | L1 |
| 78 | June 20 | @ Diamondbacks | 16–8 | **Bradley** (6–3) | Gallen (3–6) | — | 30,575 | 37–41 | W1 |
| 79 | June 21 | @ Diamondbacks | 4–2 | **Laweryson** (1–0) | Morillo (2–4) | **Banda** (2) | 34,024 | 38–41 | W2 |
| 80 | June 22 | Dodgers | 1–2 | Lauer (3–5) | **Matthews** (3–5) | Scott (10) | 35,244 | 38–42 | L1 |
| 81 | June 23 | Dodgers | 3–12 | Wrobleski (9–2) | **Voth** (0–1) | — | 30,117 | 38–43 | L2 |
| 82 | June 24 | Dodgers | 3–4 | Ohtani (8–2) | **Ryan** (5–4) | Scott (11) | 39,853 | 38–44 | L3 |
| 83 | June 26 | Rockies | 9–8 (10) | **Morris** (3–2) | Herget (0–2) | — | 27,317 | 39–44 | W1 |
| 84 | June 27 | Rockies | 5–8 | Lorenzen (3–9) | **Paredes** (0–1) | Herget (3) | 25,115 | 39–45 | L1 |
| 85 | June 28 | Rockies | 3–2 | **Morris** (4–2) | Halvorsen (0–1) | **Gómez** (8) | 20,277 | 40–45 | W1 |
| 86 | June 29 | @ Astros | 5–4 | **Matthews** (4–5) | Lambert (6–5) | **Gómez** (9) | 22,969 | 41–45 | W2 |
| 87 | June 30 | @ Astros | 4–6 | Burrows (4–8) | **Ryan** (5–5) | Hader (8) | 26,848 | 41–46 | L1 |

July: 15–9 (Home: 8–4; Road: 7–5)

| # | Date | Opponent | Score | Win | Loss | Save | Attendance | Record | Streak |
|---|---|---|---|---|---|---|---|---|---|
| 88 | July 1 | @ Astros | 8–3 | **Bradley** (7–3) | Imai (5–4) | — | 29,179 | 42–46 | W1 |
| 89 | July 3 | @ Yankees | 2–5 | Cole (3–3) | **Paredes** (0–2) | Bednar (17) | 45,104 | 42–47 | L1 |
| 90 | July 4 | @ Yankees | 11–4 | **Rogers** (4–3) | Beck (0–1) | — | 40,156 | 43–47 | W1 |
| 91 | July 5 | @ Yankees | 6–1 | **Ryan** (6–5) | Weathers (3–7) | — | 39,155 | 44–47 | W2 |
| 92 | July 7 | Guardians | 3–1 | **Bradley** (8–3) | Cantillo (7–4) | **Gómez** (10) | 17,813 | 45–47 | W3 |
| 93 | July 8 | Guardians | 6–5 | **Gómez** (1–0) | Festa (2–2) | — | 14,901 | 46–47 | W4 |
| 94 | July 9 | Guardians | 2–5 | Williams (10–4) | **Rojas** (1–1) | Smith (27) | 22,221 | 46–48 | L1 |
| 95 | July 10 | Angels | 3–4 | Rodriguez (3–2) | **Matthews** (4–6) | Yates (3) | 26,893 | 46–49 | L2 |
| 96 | July 11 | Angels | 5–3 | **Nance** (2–2) | Farris (0–1) | **Gómez** (11) | 21,286 | 47–49 | W1 |
| 97 | July 12 | Angels | 4–2 | **Bradley** (9–3) | Soriano (8–6) | **Morris** (3) | 20,509 | 48–49 | W2 |
| ASG | July 14 | AL @ NL | 4–0 | Cease (1–0) | Sánchez (0–1) | ― | 43,916 | — | N/A |
| 98 | July 17 | @ Cubs | 5–2 | **Ober** (7–3) | Rea (7–6) | **Gómez** (12) | 39,855 | 49–49 | W3 |
| 99 | July 18 | @ Cubs | 2–6 | Boyd (6–1) | **Bradley** (9–4) | — | 39,508 | 49–50 | L1 |
| 100 | July 19 | @ Cubs | 1–10 | Imanaga (6–8) | **Matthews** (4–7) | — | 37,205 | 49–51 | L2 |
| 101 | July 20 | @ Guardians | 4–13 | Bibee (4–9) | **Ryan** (6–6) | — | 22,501 | 49–52 | L3 |
| 102 | July 21 | @ Guardians | 2–5 | Holderman (5–2) | **Paredes** (0–3) | Smith (29) | 19,714 | 49–53 | L4 |
| 103 | July 22 | @ Guardians | 10–6 | **Adams** (2–0) | Cecconi (4–7) | — | 22,807 | 50–53 | W1 |
| 104 | July 23 | @ Guardians | 3–1 (12) | **Rogers** (5–3) | Sabrowski (3–2) | **Anderson** (1) | 27,354 | 51–53 | W2 |
| 105 | July 24 | Athletics | 0–2 | Lopez (5–4) | **Matthews** (4–8) | Harris (8) | 26,128 | 51–54 | L1 |
| 106 | July 25 | Athletics | 2–0 | **Rogers** (6–3) | Barnett (1–1) | **Gómez** (13) | 30,873 | 52–54 | W1 |
| 107 | July 26 | Athletics | 11–8 | **Prielipp** (3–5) | Springs (3–10) | — | 19,701 | 53–54 | W2 |
| 108 | July 28 | Royals | 3–2 | **Anderson** (1–0) | Lange (1–6) | — | 21,518 | 54–54 | W3 |
| 109 | July 29 | Royals | 0–4 | Dobnak (1–0) | **Ryan** (6–7) | — | 18,728 | 54–55 | L1 |
| 110 | July 30 | Royals | 4–3 | **Gómez** (2–0) | Strahm (3–4) | — | 22,944 | 55–55 | W1 |
| 111 | July 31 | @ Mariners | 5–3 | **Funderburk** (2–1) | Ferrer (4–2) | **Gómez** (14) | 43,489 | 56–55 | W2 |

August: 10–17 (Home: 7–6; Road: 3–11)

| # | Date | Opponent | Score | Win | Loss | Save | Attendance | Record | Streak |
|---|---|---|---|---|---|---|---|---|---|
| 112 | August 1 | @ Mariners | 3–4 | Muñoz (4–4) | **Morris** (4–3) | — | 41,423 | 56–56 | L1 |
| 113 | August 2 | @ Mariners | 6–7 | Muñoz (5–4) | **Gómez** (2–1) | — | 41,710 | 56–57 | L2 |
| 114 | August 4 | @ Royals | 2–8 | Dobnak (2–0) | **Ryan** (6–8) | — | 20,177 | 56–58 | L3 |
| 115 | August 5 | @ Royals | 1–2 | Cameron (6–8) | **Minter** (1–2) | Cruz (3) | 13,439 | 56–59 | L4 |
| 116 | August 6 | @ Royals | 4–3 | **Funderburk** (3–1) | Bummer (1–2) | **Gómez** (15) | 16,036 | 57–59 | W1 |
| 117 | August 7 | @ Brewers | 8–6 | **Matthews** (5–8) | Senzatela (9–3) | **Gómez** (16) | 42,118 | 58–59 | W2 |
| 118 | August 8 | @ Brewers | 3–4 | Ashby (13–2) | **Hoffman** (6–8) | Megill (21) | 40,625 | 58–60 | L1 |
| 119 | August 9 | @ Brewers | 3–4 (10) | Hall (1–0) | **Gómez** (2–2) | — | 42,731 | 58–61 | L2 |
| 120 | August 10 | Orioles | 9–5 | **Kremer** (2–4) | Rogers (7–8) | — | 20,155 | 59–61 | W1 |
| 121 | August 11 | Orioles | 2–5 | Young (9–3) | **Ober** (7–4) | Kittredge (6) | 21,677 | 59–62 | L1 |
| 122 | August 12 | Orioles | 7–5 | **Matthews** (6–8) | Baz (4–12) | **Gómez** (17) | 20,160 | 60–62 | W1 |
| 123 | August 13 | Phillies* | 1–7 | Nola (4–9) | **Bradley** (9–5) | — | 7,163 | 60–63 | L1 |
| 124 | August 15 | Phillies | 1–9 | Luzardo (11–5) | **Prielipp** (3–6) | — | 29,218 | 60–64 | L2 |
| 125 | August 16 | Phillies | 5–7 | Kerkering (7–1) | **Morris** (4–4) | Durán (26) | 29,614 | 60–65 | L3 |
| 126 | August 17 | Braves | 4–2 | **Adams** (3–0) | Pérez (8–7) | **Gómez** (18) | 19,990 | 61–65 | W1 |
| 127 | August 18 | Braves | 4–1 | **Matthews** (7–8) | Mahle (4–10) | **Gómez** (19) | 22,193 | 62–65 | W2 |
| 128 | August 19 | Braves | 6–4 | **Minter** (2–2) | Mederos (2–1) | **Gómez** (20) | 20,316 | 63–65 | W3 |
| 129 | August 21 | @ Padres | 2–6 | Vásquez (9–6) | **Prielipp** (3–7) | — | 44,293 | 63–66 | L1 |
| 130 | August 22 | @ Padres | 5–7 | Canning (4–9) | **Morris** (4–5) | Miller (32) | 41,484 | 63–67 | L2 |
| 131 | August 23 | @ Padres | 1–8 | Buehler (8–6) | **Funderburk** (3–2) | — | 40,103 | 63–68 | L3 |
| 132 | August 24 | @ Athletics | 9–6 | **Matthews** (8–8) | Springs (3–12) | **Morris** (4) | 8,149 | 64–68 | W1 |
| 133 | August 25 | @ Athletics | 2–4 | Jump (6–8) | **Bradley** (9–6) | Alvarado (4) | 8,301 | 64–69 | L1 |
| 134 | August 26 | @ Athletics | 4–7 | Ginn (9–8) | **Morris** (4–6) | Alvarado (5) | 9,446 | 64–70 | L2 |
| 135 | August 28 | White Sox | 4–7 | Taylor (7–2) | **Kremer** (2–5) | Hudson (6) | 28,140 | 64–71 | L3 |
| 136 | August 29 | White Sox | 2–3 | Fedde (7–8) | **Morris** (4–7) | Hudson (7) | 28,310 | 64–72 | L4 |
| 137 | August 30 | White Sox | 5–1 | **Matthews** (9–8) | Hicks (2–2) | — | 26,225 | 65–72 | W1 |
| 138 | August 31 | Tigers | 11–1 | **Bradley** (10–6) | Jobe (1–2) | — | 14,918 | 66–72 | W2 |
*August 13 game played at Field of Dreams in Dyersville, Iowa

September: 11–13 (Home: 5–6; Road: 6–7)

| # | Date | Opponent | Score | Win | Loss | Save | Attendance | Record | Streak |
|---|---|---|---|---|---|---|---|---|---|
| 139 | September 1 | Tigers | 15–2 | **Prielipp** (4–7) | Melton (7–4) | — | 17,267 | 67–72 | W3 |
| 140 | September 2 | Tigers | 6–11 (12) | Finnegan (3–0) | **Nance** (2–3) | — | 13,770 | 67–73 | L1 |
| 141 | September 4 | @ White Sox | 1–4 | Fedde (8–8) | **Matthews** (9–9) | — | 25,616 | 67–74 | L2 |
| 142 | September 5 | @ White Sox | 6–4 | **Bradley** (11–6) | Kay (11–6) | **Gómez** (21) | 27,749 | 68–74 | W1 |
| 143 | September 6 | @ White Sox | 1–10 | Smith (3–1) | **Ober** (7–5) | — | 32,024 | 68–75 | L1 |
| 144 | September 7 | @ Tigers | 4–5 | Melton (8–4) | **Ryan** (6–9) | Jansen (18) | 23,314 | 68–76 | L2 |
| 145 | September 8 | @ Tigers | 3–2 | **Kremer** (3–5) | Anderson (4–6) | **Gómez** (22) | 22,874 | 69–76 | W1 |
| 146 | September 9 | @ Tigers | 2–7 | Holton (2–5) | **Matthews** (9–10) | — | 18,788 | 69–77 | L1 |
| 147 | September 11 | Guardians | 2–5 | Gaddis (4–3) | **Gómez** (2–3) | Smith (36) | 20,907 | 69–78 | L2 |
| 148 | September 12 | Guardians | 4–3 | **Prielipp** (5–7) | Aleman (0–1) | **Minter** (1) | 26,158 | 70–78 | W1 |
| 149 | September 13 | Guardians | 2–9 | Bibee (6–15) | **Ryan** (6–10) | — | 17,676 | 70–79 | L1 |
| 150 | September 14 | Yankees | 3–8 | Hill (5–2) | **Morris** (4–8) | Schreiber (2) | 24,204 | 70–80 | L2 |
| 151 | September 15 | Yankees | 1–8 | Fried (5–4) | **Ober** (7–6) | — | 27,882 | 70–81 | L3 |
| 152 | September 16 | Yankees | 5–4 (13) | **Nance** (3–3) | Schreiber (2–4) | — | 27,887 | 71–81 | W1 |
| 153 | September 17 | @ Angels | 4–5 (10) | Weiman (1–1) | **Gómez** (2–4) | — | 34,251 | 71–82 | L1 |
| 154 | September 18 | @ Angels | 3–0 | **Prielipp** (6–7) | Rodriguez (4–8) | **Adams** (3) | 35,237 | 72–82 | W1 |
| 155 | September 19 | @ Angels | 5–6 (11) | Saucedo (1–1) | **Rogers** (6–4) | — | 33,726 | 72–83 | L1 |
| 156 | September 20 | @ Angels | 8–0 | **Kremer** (4–5) | Johnson (5–9) | **Ober** (1) | 32,240 | 73–83 | W1 |
| 157 | September 21 | @ Giants | 2–5 | Beck (1–0) | **Matthews** (9–11) | Harris (2) | 27,466 | 73–84 | L1 |
| 158 | September 22 | @ Giants | 3–2 | **Bradley** (12–6) | Molina (3–2) | **Hoffman** (6) | 28,079 | 74–84 | W1 |
| 159 | September 23 | @ Giants | 4–2 | **Gómez** (3–4) | Smith (0–6) | **Morris** (5) | 28,136 | 75–84 | W2 |
| 160 | September 25 | Rangers | 10–2 | **Ryan** (7–10) | deGrom (11–11) | — | 25,768 | 76–84 | W3 |
| 161 | September 26 | Rangers | 2–6 | Garcia (2–1) | **Ober** (7–7) | — | 28,491 | 76–85 | L1 |
| 162 | September 27 | Rangers | 6–4 | **Kremer** (5–5) | Silseth (3–4) | — | 26,839 | 77–85 | W1 |

== Roster ==
2026 Minnesota Twins
Roster
| Pitchers: 20 Mick Abel; 50 Garrett Acton; 45 Travis Adams; 30 Jack Anderson; 43 Anthony Banda; 26 Taj Bradley; 57 Kody Funderburk; 40 Luis García; 1 Woo-suk Go; 94 Yoendrys Gómez; 24 Jeff Hoffman; 54 Zak Kent; 71 John Klein; 13 Dean Kremer; 65 Cody Laweryson; 31 Justin Lawrence; 52 Zebby Matthews; 33 A. J. Minter; 78 Andrew Morris; 35 Tommy Nance; 17 Bailey Ober; 19 Eric Orze; 53 Mike Paredes; 61 Connor Prielipp; 54 Marco Raya; 55 Taylor Rogers; 60 Kendry Rojas; 41 Joe Ryan; 44 Cole Sands; 48 Justin Topa; 30 Austin Voth; 24 Simeon Woods Richardson | Catchers: 37 Víctor Caratini; 70 Alex Jackson; 27 Ryan Jeffers; Infielders: 11 Orlando Arcia; 56 Josh Bell; 2 Kody Clemens; 12 Kaelen Culpepper; 4 Tristan Gray; 15 Luke Keaschall; 5 Ryan Kreidler; 22 Brooks Lee; 23 Royce Lewis; 1 Ben Ross; 31 Aaron Sabato | Outfielders: 25 Byron Buxton; 51 Kyler Fedko; 72 Gabriel Gonzalez; 11 Walker Jenkins; 9 Trevor Larnach; 16 Austin Martin; 30 James Outman; 18 Alan Roden; 21 Emmanuel Rodríguez; 38 Matt Wallner | Manager: 8 Derek Shelton; Coaches: 67 Trevor Amicone (assistant hitting); 84 Keith Beauregard (hitting); 46 Ramon Borrego (third base); 75 Nate Dammann (quality control); 98 Anderson De La Rosa (bullpen catcher); 66 Toby Gardenhire (major league field coordinator); 68 Mark Hallberg (bench); 32 LaTroy Hawkins (bullpen); 88 Pete Maki (pitching); 98 Frank Nigro (bullpen catcher); 63 Mike Rabelo (assistant bench); 91 Luis Ramirez (assistant pitching); 79 Rayden Sierra (assistant hitting); 0 Grady Sizemore (first base) |

== Player stats ==
| = Indicates team leader |

| = Indicates league leader |

=== Batting ===
Note: G = Games played; AB = At bats; R = Runs scored; H = Hits; 2B = Doubles; 3B = Triples; HR = Home runs; RBI = Runs batted in; SB = Stolen bases; BB = Walks; AVG = Batting average; SLG = Slugging average

| Player | G | AB | R | H | 2B | 3B | HR | RBI | SB | BB | AVG | SLG |
|---|---|---|---|---|---|---|---|---|---|---|---|---|
| Brooks Lee | 156 | 586 | 72 | 148 | 25 | 3 | 24 | 83 | 8 | 37 | .253 | .428 |
| Josh Bell | 154 | 568 | 78 | 145 | 28 | 1 | 21 | 96 | 2 | 52 | .255 | .419 |
| Kody Clemens | 145 | 531 | 74 | 127 | 22 | 7 | 27 | 81 | 10 | 39 | .239 | .460 |
| Luke Keaschall | 152 | 528 | 86 | 149 | 28 | 4 | 10 | 52 | 20 | 59 | .282 | .407 |
| Royce Lewis | 125 | 463 | 51 | 105 | 24 | 1 | 15 | 57 | 16 | 38 | .227 | .380 |
| Trevor Larnach | 122 | 383 | 57 | 103 | 23 | 1 | 13 | 48 | 2 | 45 | .269 | .436 |
| Byron Buxton | 93 | 370 | 65 | 94 | 18 | 1 | 25 | 46 | 7 | 30 | .254 | .511 |
| Victor Caratini | 106 | 327 | 28 | 72 | 10 | 0 | 7 | 44 | 0 | 34 | .220 | .315 |
| Ryan Jeffers | 92 | 317 | 49 | 81 | 19 | 2 | 14 | 56 | 1 | 46 | .256 | .461 |
| Austin Martin | 118 | 302 | 42 | 69 | 17 | 0 | 3 | 24 | 12 | 45 | .228 | .315 |
| Ryan Kreidler | 105 | 243 | 33 | 53 | 9 | 3 | 8 | 29 | 4 | 21 | .218 | .379 |
| Tristan Gray | 66 | 173 | 16 | 39 | 5 | 0 | 4 | 29 | 2 | 10 | .225 | .324 |
| Matt Wallner | 34 | 120 | 14 | 20 | 3 | 0 | 4 | 10 | 0 | 10 | .167 | .292 |
| Kaelen Culpepper | 33 | 117 | 15 | 32 | 5 | 0 | 3 | 11 | 1 | 6 | .274 | .393 |
| Walker Jenkins | 26 | 84 | 14 | 19 | 2 | 0 | 4 | 10 | 1 | 7 | .226 | .393 |
| Alan Roden | 32 | 79 | 7 | 23 | 5 | 0 | 1 | 14 | 0 | 12 | .291 | .392 |
| Alex Jackson | 33 | 69 | 12 | 21 | 4 | 0 | 1 | 5 | 0 | 2 | .304 | .406 |
| James Outman | 49 | 64 | 9 | 10 | 4 | 1 | 0 | 3 | 4 | 5 | .156 | .250 |
| Orlando Arcia | 19 | 48 | 6 | 13 | 1 | 0 | 1 | 2 | 0 | 2 | .271 | .354 |
| Emmanuel Rodríguez | 13 | 45 | 3 | 8 | 2 | 1 | 2 | 5 | 0 | 3 | .178 | .400 |
| Ben Ross | 10 | 21 | 5 | 4 | 2 | 1 | 0 | 1 | 1 | 0 | .190 | .381 |
| Kyler Fedko | 14 | 16 | 1 | 0 | 0 | 0 | 0 | 1 | 0 | 2 | .000 | .000 |
| Gabriel González | 7 | 8 | 2 | 2 | 0 | 0 | 0 | 0 | 0 | 2 | .250 | .250 |
| Aaron Sabato | 3 | 6 | 0 | 0 | 0 | 0 | 0 | 0 | 0 | 0 | .000 | .000 |
| Totals | 162 | 5468 | 739 | 1337 | 256 | 26 | 187 | 707 | 91 | 507 | .245 | .403 |

=== Pitching ===
Note: W = Wins; L = Losses; ERA = Earned run average; G = Games pitched; GS = Games started; SV = Saves; IP = Innings pitched; H = Hits allowed; R = Runs allowed; ER = Earned runs allowed; BB = Walks allowed; SO = Strikeouts'

| Player | W | L | ERA | G | GS | SV | IP | H | R | ER | BB | SO |
| Taj Bradley | 12 | 6 | 3.73 | 31 | 31 | 0 | 178.1 | 142 | 74 | 74 | 76 | 205 |
| Joe Ryan | 7 | 10 | 3.79 | 27 | 27 | 0 | 144.2 | 137 | 74 | 61 | 31 | 159 |
| Bailey Ober | 7 | 7 | 4.47 | 25 | 24 | 1 | 131.0 | 133 | 69 | 65 | 37 | 96 |
| Zebby Matthews | 9 | 11 | 4.90 | 23 | 23 | 0 | 130.1 | 125 | 76 | 71 | 39 | 116 |
| Connor Prielipp | 6 | 7 | 4.87 | 24 | 22 | 0 | 125.2 | 118 | 76 | 68 | 44 | 128 |
| Andrew Morris | 4 | 8 | 4.40 | 64 | 3 | 5 | 73.2 | 74 | 42 | 36 | 27 | 69 |
| Taylor Rogers | 6 | 4 | 4.33 | 65 | 0 | 2 | 60.1 | 65 | 35 | 29 | 31 | 54 |
| Travis Adams | 3 | 0 | 4.58 | 40 | 0 | 3 | 59.0 | 53 | 32 | 30 | 25 | 62 |
| Dean Kremer | 4 | 1 | 3.48 | 10 | 10 | 0 | 54.1 | 36 | 22 | 21 | 18 | 48 |
| Kody Funderburk | 3 | 2 | 3.71 | 58 | 0 | 1 | 51.0 | 43 | 21 | 21 | 27 | 49 |
| Yoendrys Gómez | 3 | 4 | 3.62 | 56 | 0 | 21 | 49.2 | 39 | 23 | 20 | 29 | 52 |
| Simeon Woods Richardson | 0 | 7 | 7.74 | 12 | 10 | 0 | 47.2 | 65 | 46 | 41 | 25 | 26 |
| Eric Orze | 2 | 2 | 5.66 | 36 | 0 | 1 | 41.1 | 42 | 27 | 26 | 21 | 36 |
| Mike Paredes | 0 | 3 | 4.72 | 9 | 5 | 0 | 34.1 | 36 | 19 | 18 | 13 | 19 |
| Anthony Banda | 2 | 0 | 4.46 | 39 | 0 | 2 | 34.1 | 31 | 19 | 17 | 15 | 33 |
| Kendry Rojas | 1 | 1 | 3.34 | 12 | 4 | 0 | 29.2 | 23 | 11 | 11 | 22 | 34 |
| Tommy Nance | 2 | 1 | 4.05 | 25 | 0 | 0 | 26.2 | 30 | 13 | 12 | 11 | 34 |
| A.J. Minter | 1 | 1 | 2.78 | 25 | 0 | 1 | 22.2 | 19 | 8 | 7 | 6 | 21 |
| Mick Abel | 1 | 2 | 3.98 | 4 | 3 | 0 | 20.1 | 22 | 9 | 9 | 10 | 23 |
| Justin Topa | 0 | 1 | 8.05 | 23 | 0 | 2 | 19.0 | 27 | 18 | 17 | 11 | 12 |
| Jeff Hoffman | 0 | 1 | 2.50 | 20 | 0 | 1 | 18.0 | 9 | 5 | 5 | 12 | 27 |
| Cody Laweryson | 1 | 0 | 4.86 | 15 | 0 | 1 | 16.2 | 15 | 12 | 9 | 8 | 18 |
| Cole Sands | 1 | 1 | 8.25 | 13 | 0 | 1 | 12.0 | 15 | 11 | 11 | 5 | 11 |
| Garrett Acton | 1 | 1 | 5.73 | 7 | 0 | 0 | 11.0 | 10 | 10 | 7 | 6 | 14 |
| Luis García | 0 | 1 | 10.38 | 9 | 0 | 2 | 8.2 | 12 | 10 | 10 | 4 | 2 |
| Marco Raya | 0 | 0 | 3.00 | 3 | 0 | 0 | 4.1 | 3 | 2 | 2 | 4 | 2 |
| Justin Lawrence | 0 | 1 | 18.00 | 7 | 0 | 0 | 6.0 | 10 | 12 | 12 | 9 | 12 |
| John Klein | 0 | 1 | 4.15 | 3 | 0 | 0 | 4.1 | 3 | 2 | 2 | 4 | 2 |
| Jack Anderson | 1 | 0 | 0.00 | 4 | 0 | 1 | 4.2 | 2 | 0 | 0 | 1 | 6 |
| Woo-suk Go | 0 | 0 | 9.00 | 4 | 0 | 0 | 4.0 | 8 | 4 | 4 | 2 | 5 |
| Austin Voth | 0 | 1 | 11.25 | 1 | 0 | 0 | 4.0 | 11 | 6 | 5 | 1 | 2 |
| Zak Kent | 0 | 0 | 4.91 | 2 | 0 | 0 | 3.2 | 4 | 5 | 2 | 5 | 2 |
| Alex Jackson | 0 | 0 | 13.50 | 2 | 0 | 0 | 2.0 | 3 | 3 | 3 | 1 | 0 |
| Orlando Arcia | 0 | 0 | 9.00 | 1 | 0 | 0 | 1.0 | 1 | 1 | 1 | 2 | 0 |
| Totals | 77 | 85 | 4.56 | 162 | 162 | 45 | 1435.2 | 1368 | 797 | 727 | 581 | 1381 |

== Farm system ==
| Level | Team | League | Manager |
|---|---|---|---|
| AAA | St. Paul Saints | International League | Brian Dinkelman |
| AA | Wichita Wind Surge | Texas League | Nico Giarratano |
| High-A | Cedar Rapids Kernels | Midwest League | Brian Meyer |
| Low-A | Fort Myers Mighty Mussels | Florida State League | Jordan Smith |
| Rookie | FCL Twins | Florida Complex League | Tristan Toorie |
| Rookie | DSL Twins | Dominican Summer League | Rafael Martinez |
