= Emmanuel Rodriguez =

Emmanuel Rodriguez may refer to:

- Emmanuel Rodríguez (born 1992), Puerto Rican boxer
- Emmanuel Rodriguez (entertainer), former member of the Australian pop group Justice Crew
- Emmanuel Rodriguez (born 1934), real name of Rico Rodriguez (musician)
- Emmanuel Rodríguez (baseball)
