= Andrew Morris (baseball) =

American baseball player (born 2001)

Minnesota Twins – No. 78
- Pitcher
- Born: September 1, 2001 (age 25); New York, New York, U.S.
- Bats: Right Throws: Right

MLB debut
- April 12, 2026, for the Minnesota Twins

MLB statistics (through 2026 season)
- Win–loss record: 4–8
- Earned run average: 4.40
- Strikeouts: 69
- Stats at Baseball Reference

Teams
- Minnesota Twins (2026–present)

Andrew Burke Morris (born September 1, 2001) is an American professional baseball pitcher for the Minnesota Twins of Major League Baseball (MLB). He made his MLB debut in 2026.

== Amateur career ==
Morris attended Monarch High School in Louisville, Colorado. He enrolled at Colorado Mesa University, where he played college baseball for the Colorado Mesa Mavericks for three years before transferring to Texas Tech University, where he played for the Texas Tech Red Raiders for one year.

== Professional career ==
The Minnesota Twins selected Morris in the fourth round (114th overall) of the 2022 Major League Baseball draft. Morris signed with the Twins and made his professional debut with the rookie-level Florida Complex League Twins. He pitched 2023 with Fort Myers Mighty Mussels and Cedar Rapids Kernels. Morris started 2024 with Cedar Rapids before being promoted to the Double-A Wichita Wind Surge.

Morris made 21 appearances (19 starts) for the Triple-A St. Paul Saints in 2025, posting a 4–6 record and 4.09 ERA with 89 strikeouts across 94 2/3 innings pitched. On November 18, 2025, the Twins added Morris to their 40-man roster to protect him from the Rule 5 draft.

Morris was optioned to Triple-A St. Paul to begin the 2026 season. On April 11, 2026, Morris was promoted to the major leagues for the first time following an injury to Cody Laweryson.
