= Ty France =

American baseball player (born 1994)

- France with the San Diego Padres in 2026

Free agent
- First baseman
- Born: July 13, 1994 (age 32); Downey, California, U.S.
- Bats: Right Throws: Right

MLB debut
- April 26, 2019, for the San Diego Padres

MLB statistics (through 2026 season)
- Batting average: .267
- Home runs: 102
- Runs batted in: 436
- Stats at Baseball Reference

Teams
- San Diego Padres (2019–2020); Seattle Mariners (2020–2024); Cincinnati Reds (2024); Minnesota Twins (2025); Toronto Blue Jays (2025); San Diego Padres (2026)

Career highlights and awards
- All-Star (2022); Gold Glove Award (2025)

Tyler Lawrence France (born July 13, 1994) is an American professional baseball first baseman who is a free agent. He has played in Major League Baseball (MLB) for the San Diego Padres, Seattle Mariners, Cincinnati Reds, Minnesota Twins, and Toronto Blue Jays. France was an All-Star in 2022.

== Amateur career ==
France attended South Hills High School in West Covina, California. After high school, he enrolled at San Diego State University, where he played college baseball for the San Diego State Aztecs from 2013–2015. In 2013, he played summer college baseball with the Bethesda Big Train, for whom he was the team's Outstanding Hitter. In 2015, his junior season, he batted .336 with four home runs and 49 runs batted in (RBIs) in 64 games. He finished his career at San Diego State with a .337/.428/.470 line across three seasons.

== Professional career ==
=== San Diego Padres ===
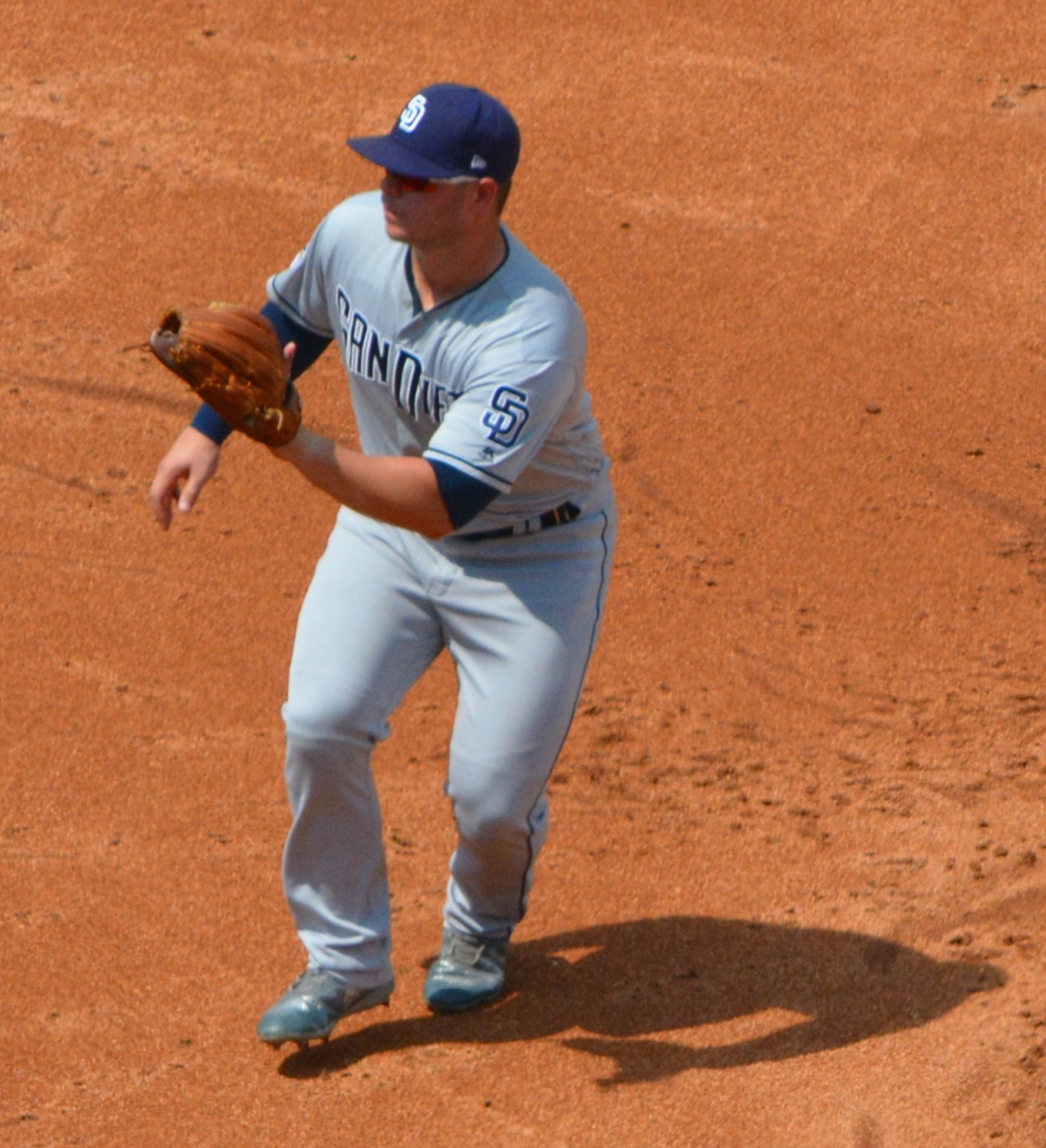
France in 2019

The San Diego Padres selected France in the 34th round, with the 1,017th overall selection of the 2015 MLB draft, and he signed with them for a $100,000 signing bonus. France made his professional debut in 2015 with the Low-A Tri-City Dust Devils, hitting .294/.425/.391 with one home run and 36 RBI. He split the 2016 season between the Single-A Fort Wayne TinCaps and the High-A Lake Elsinore Storm, hitting .271/.387/.420 with 14 home runs and 73 RBI. He split his 2017 season between Lake Elsinore and the Double-A San Antonio Missions, hitting .278/.353/.373 with five home runs and 58 RBI. He split the 2018 season between San Antonio and the Triple-A El Paso Chihuahuas, hitting .267/.355/.464 with 22 home runs and 96 RBI.

On November 20, 2018, the Padres added France to their 40-man roster to protect him from the Rule 5 draft. France opened the 2019 season back with El Paso. On April 24, he was called up to the major league roster for the first time. He made his debut on April 26; he hit a pinch hit single in his first at bat.

France was called up again to the Padres on August 16, 2019. At that time he was batting .399 with their minor league affiliate El Paso Chihuahuas. Although he had wanted to end his Triple-A season batting .400 he remained with the big league club for the duration of 2019 and ended .001 point shy of the elusive .400 mark.

France made the Opening Day roster to the start the 2020 season, marking his first appearance on an Opening Day roster. He was the starting designated hitter on Opening Day, which had been added to the National League for the 2020 season due to the new COVID-19 rules. He had one hit in four at-bats in the Padres' 7-2 victory over the Arizona Diamondbacks. On August 13, 2020, France was optioned to the Padres alternative roster to make room for shortstop Jorge Mateo.

=== Seattle Mariners ===
On August 30, 2020, the Padres traded France, Taylor Trammell, Andrés Muñoz, and Luis Torrens to the Seattle Mariners in exchange for Austin Nola, Dan Altavilla, and Austin Adams. In 23 games for Seattle, France hit .302 with 2 home runs and 13 RBI.

In 2021, France slashed .291/.368/.445 with 18 home runs, 73 RBI, and 85 runs scored in 152 games. He tied for the major league lead in hit by pitch, with 27.

On April 23, 2022, France recorded his first career five-hit game, going 5-for-6 with a home run in a game versus the Kansas City Royals. On April 25, France and Miguel Cabrera were awarded American League co-player of the week. France was named to the 2022 MLB All-Star Game as an injury replacement for Mike Trout. He made 140 total appearances for Seattle in 2022, hitting .274/.338/.436 with 20 home runs and 83 RBI.

On January 13, 2023, France agreed to a one-year, $4.1 million contract with the Mariners, avoiding salary arbitration. In 2023, he hit .250/.337/.366 with 12 home runs and 58 RBI, leading the majors in hit by pitches (34).

On January 11, 2024, France and the Mariners agreed to a contract worth $6.775 million for the 2024 season. On June 8, France surpassed Edgar Martínez to become the Mariners' franchise hit by pitch leader with 90. On July 21, the Mariners placed France on outright waivers due to his struggles on offense throughout the season. After clearing waivers on July 23, France was designated for assignment.

=== Cincinnati Reds ===
On July 29, 2024, the Mariners traded France to the Cincinnati Reds in exchange for Andruw Salcedo. In 52 games for Cincinnati, he slashed .251/.292/.391 with five home runs and 20 RBI. On November 1, France was removed from the 40–man roster and sent outright to the Triple–A Louisville Bats, but rejected the assignment and elected free agency.

=== Minnesota Twins ===
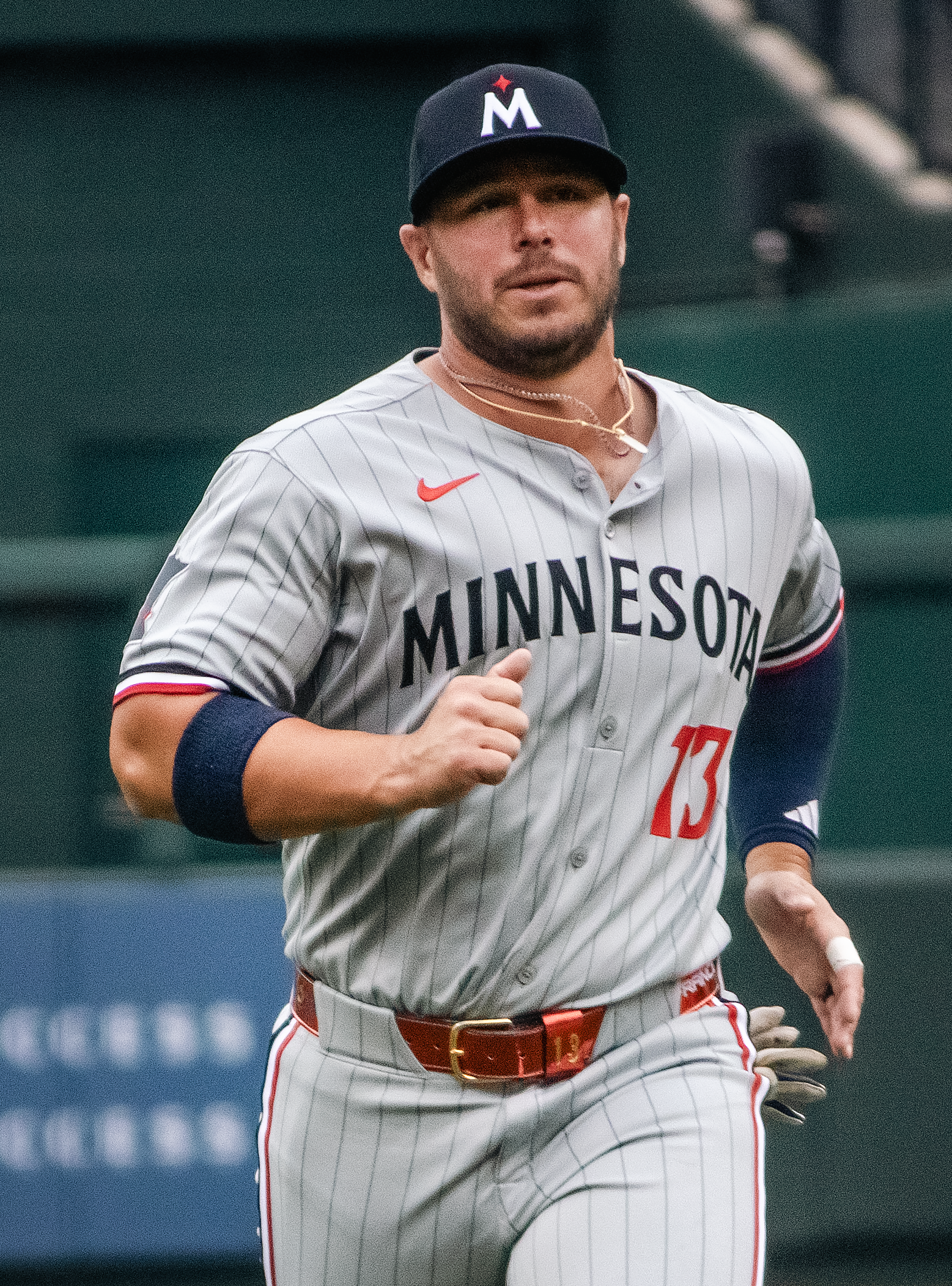
France with the Twins in 2025.

On February 15, 2025, France signed a one-year, $1 million contract with the Minnesota Twins. He delivered a walk-off single against the New York Mets on April 16. France had his second walk-off hit of the season, a home run this time, against the Kansas City Royals on May 23. He made 101 total appearances for the Twins, batting .251/.320/.357 with six home runs, 44 RBI, and one stolen base.

=== Toronto Blue Jays ===
On July 31, 2025, the Twins traded France and Louis Varland to the Toronto Blue Jays in exchange for Alan Roden and Kendry Rojas. He made 37 total appearances for the Blue Jays, batting .277/.320/.372 with one home run, and eight RBI. With the two organizations, France batting .257/.320/.360 with seven home runs, 52 RBI, and one stolen base. On November 2, 2025, France was awarded his first career Gold Glove Award for American League first basemen.

=== San Diego Padres (second stint) ===
On February 16, 2026, France returned to the San Diego Padres on a minor league contract. On March 25, the Padres selected France's contract after he made the team's Opening Day roster. In 2026, he hit a career-high 21 home runs along with a team-leading .865 on-base plus slugging (OPS). The San Diego chapter of the Baseball Writers' Association of America voted him the Padres' most valuable player (MVP).

== Personal life ==
France and his wife married in January 2022. On April 6, 2024, she gave birth to their first child, a baby boy. She later had twins.

== See also ==
- List of Major League Baseball career hit by pitch leaders
- Minnesota Twins award winners and league leaders
- Toronto Blue Jays award winners and league leaders
