= Travis Adams =

American baseball player (born 2000)

Minnesota Twins – No. 45
- Pitcher
- Born: January 19, 2000 (age 26); Palm Springs, California, U.S.
- Bats: Right Throws: Right

MLB debut
- July 5, 2025, for the Minnesota Twins

MLB statistics (through 2026 season)
- Win–loss record: 4–4
- Earned run average: 5.63
- Strikeouts: 93
- Stats at Baseball Reference

Teams
- Minnesota Twins (2025–present)

Travis Michael Adams (born January 19, 2000) is an American professional baseball pitcher for the Minnesota Twins of Major League Baseball (MLB). He made his MLB debut in 2025.

== Career ==
=== Amateur ===
Adams attended Palm Desert High School in Palm Desert, California, and California State University, Sacramento, where he played college baseball for the Sacramento State Hornets. He logged a combined 10–6 win–loss record and 3.75 earned run average (ERA) with 130 strikeouts and 25 walks across 151 innings pitched. In 2020, Adams played collegiate summer baseball for the Wisconsin Rapids Rafters of the Northwoods League.

=== Minnesota Twins ===
The Minnesota Twins selected Adams in the sixth round, with the 189th overall selection, of the 2021 Major League Baseball draft. He made his professional debut with the rookie-level Florida Complex League Twins. Adams split the 2022 campaign between the Single-A Fort Myers Mighty Mussels and High-A Cedar Rapids Kernels, accumulating a combined 6–8 record and 3.93 ERA with 108 strikeouts in 100 2/3 innings pitched across 22 starts. He spent 2023 with the Double-A Wichita Wind Surge, compiling a 4–10 record and 5.66 ERA with 97 strikeouts in 109 2/3 strikeouts over 26 games (22 starts).

Adams spent 2024 with Double-A Wichita and the Triple-A St. Paul Saints, compiling a 5–9 record and 3.90 ERA with 118 strikeouts across 127 innings pitched. On November 19, 2024, the Twins added Adams to their 40-man roster to protect him from the Rule 5 draft.

The Twins optioned Adams to Triple-A St. Paul to begin the 2025 season. In 13 appearances for the Saints, he logged a 3–1 record and 3.43 ERA with 37 strikeouts and three saves across 42 innings of work. On June 6, 2025, Adams was promoted to the major leagues for the first time. He went unused out of the bullpen, and was optioned back to St. Paul on June 9, briefly becoming a phantom ballplayer. Adams was promoted for a second time on July 5, and made his MLB debut that day against the Tampa Bay Rays. On July 12, Adams recorded his first career win, allowing one earned run in four innings of relief against the Pittsburgh Pirates.
