= Mike Paredes =

American baseball player (born 2000)

Minnesota Twins – No. 53
- Pitcher
- Born: July 27, 2000 (age 26); San Diego, California, U.S.
- Bats: Right Throws: Right

MLB debut
- May 31, 2026, for the Minnesota Twins

MLB statistics (through 2026 season)
- Win–loss record: 0–3
- Earned run average: 4.72
- Strikeouts: 19
- Stats at Baseball Reference

Teams
- Minnesota Twins (2026–present)

Michael Exodus Paredes (born July 27, 2000) is an American professional baseball pitcher for the Minnesota Twins of Major League Baseball (MLB). He made his MLB debut in 2026.

== Amateur career ==
Paredes attended San Diego High School and San Diego State University, where he played college baseball for the San Diego State Aztecs. In summer 2019, he played for the Kalamazoo Growlers of the Northwoods League. As a junior with San Diego State, he posted a 4–0 win–loss record with a 5.59 earned run average (ERA) and 65 strikeouts in the 2021 season.

== Professional career ==
The Minnesota Twins selected Paredes in the 18th round, 549th overall, of the 2021 Major League Baseball draft. Paredes made his professional debut in 2021 with the Florida Complex League Twins, posting a 2.25 ERA with six strikeouts in two games. In his first full professional season in 2022, he pitched to a 3.27 ERA with 63 strikeouts in 24 appearances for the Single-A Fort Myers Mighty Mussels. In 2023, Paredes made 28 appearances for the High-A Cedar Rapids Kernels, recording a 3.14 ERA with 58 strikeouts across 63 innings pitched. He split the 2024 season between Single-A Fort Myers, High-A Cedar Rapids, and the Double-A Wichita Wind Surge, pitching to a 3.02 ERA with 61 strikeouts. In 2025 with Double-A Wichita and the Triple-A St. Paul Saints, Paredes logged an 11–0 record and 2.38 ERA.

Parades began the 2026 season with Double-A Wichita before being promoted to Triple-A St. Paul Saints. Between the two affiliates, he recorded a 4.44 ERA with 54 strikeouts across 48 2/3 innings pitched. On May 31, 2026, Paredes was selected to Minnesota's 40-man roster and promoted to the major leagues for the first time. On July 26, Paredes was placed on the injured list due to an oblique injury. He was transferred to the 60-day injured list on July 31.
