= Zebby Matthews =

American baseball player (born 2000)

Minnesota Twins – No. 52
- Pitcher
- Born: May 22, 2000 (age 26); Cullowhee, North Carolina, U.S.
- Bats: Right Throws: Right

MLB debut
- August 13, 2024, for the Minnesota Twins

MLB statistics (through 2026 season)
- Win–loss record: 15–21
- Earned run average: 5.39
- Strikeouts: 247
- Stats at Baseball Reference

Teams
- Minnesota Twins (2024–present)

Daniel Zebulon Matthews (born May 22, 2000) is an American professional baseball pitcher for the Minnesota Twins of Major League Baseball (MLB). He made his MLB debut in 2024.

== Amateur career ==
Matthews attended Smoky Mountain High School in Sylva, North Carolina and played college baseball at Western Carolina University.

== Professional career ==
Matthews was drafted by the Minnesota Twins in the eighth round, with the 234th overall selection, of the 2022 Major League Baseball draft. He signed with the Twins and spent his first professional season with the rookie–level Florida Complex League Twins and Single–A Fort Myers Mighty Mussels. Matthews started 2023 with Fort Myers before being promoted to the High–A Cedar Rapids Kernels. In 22 games (20 starts) for the two affiliated, he accumulated a 7–3 record and 3.84 ERA with 112 strikeouts across 105 1/3 innings pitched.

Matthews began the 2024 campaign with Cedar Rapids and later received promotions to the Double–A Wichita Wind Surge and Triple–A St. Paul Saints. On August 13, 2024, Matthews was selected to the 40-man roster and promoted to the major leagues for the first time. Matthews made 9 starts for Minnesota during his rookie campaign, struggling to a 1-4 record and 6.69 ERA with 43 strikeouts across 37 2/3 innings pitched.

Matthews was optioned to Triple-A St. Paul to begin the 2025 season. He made 16 starts for Minnesota during the regular season, compiling a 5-6 record and 5.56 ERA with 88 strikeouts across 79 1/3 innings pitched.

Matthews was again optioned to Triple-A St. Paul to begin the 2026 season.
