= Ben Ross (baseball) =

American baseball player (born 2001)

Minnesota Twins – No. 1
- Infielder
- Born: June 6, 2001 (age 25); Springfield, Ohio, U.S.
- Bats: Right Throws: Right

MLB debut
- September 1, 2026, for the Minnesota Twins

MLB statistics (through 2026 season)
- Batting average: .190
- Home runs: 0
- Runs batted in: 1
- Stats at Baseball Reference

Teams
- Minnesota Twins (2026–present)

Benjamin Andrew Ross (born June 6, 2001) is an American professional baseball infielder for the Minnesota Twins of Major League Baseball (MLB).

== Career ==
Ross played college baseball at Notre Dame College in South Euclid, Ohio. He was named second-team All-Mountain East Conference (MEC) as a sophomore after batting .426 with 20 doubles, 11 home runs, and 31 RBI. After the season, Ross played summer collegiate baseball for the Champion City Kings of the Prospect League. He was named the MEC Player of the Year after hitting .393 with 20 doubles, 14 home runs, and 60 RBI. He began the summer playing for the Wisconsin Rapids Rafters of the Northwoods League.

Ross was selected in the 5th round by the Minnesota Twins in the 2022 Major League Baseball draft. After signing with the team he was assigned to the Rookie-level Florida Complex League Twins and was later promoted to the Single-A Fort Myers Mighty Mussels. Ross was assigned to the High-A Cedar Rapids Kernels at the beginning of the 2023 season.

Ross began the 2026 season with the Double–A Wichita Wind Surge before being quickly promoted to the Triple–A St. Paul Saints, where he batted .249/.353/.458 with 15 home runs, 55 RBI, and 12 stolen bases. On September 1, 2026, Ross was selected to the 40–man roster and promoted to the major leagues for the first time.
