= Louis Varland =

American baseball player (born 1997)

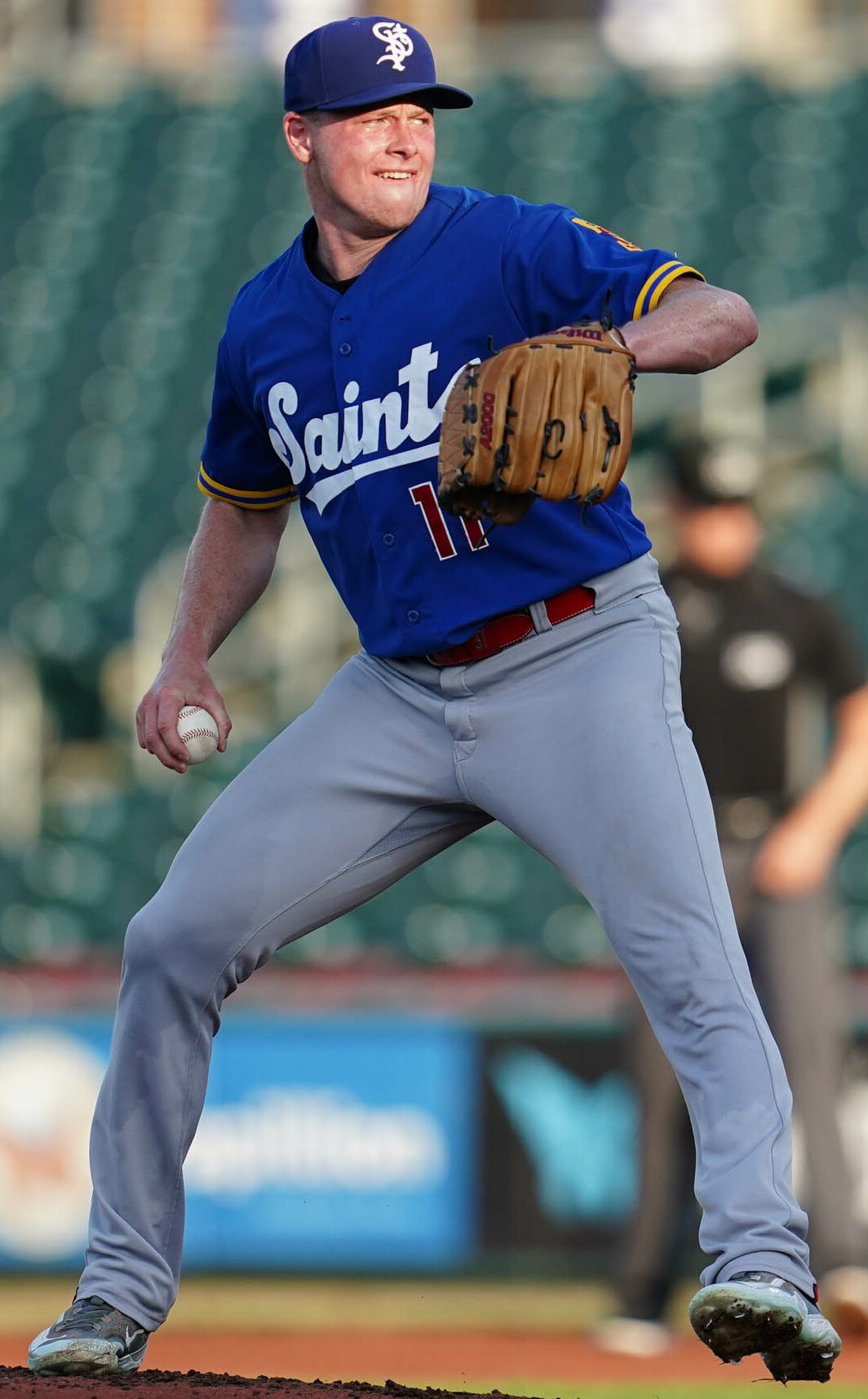
- Varland with the St. Paul Saints in 2023

Toronto Blue Jays – No. 77
- Pitcher
- Born: December 9, 1997 (age 28); Saint Paul, Minnesota, U.S.
- Bats: Left Throws: Right

MLB debut
- September 7, 2022, for the Minnesota Twins

MLB statistics (through 2026 season)
- Win–loss record: 14–20
- Earned run average: 3.76
- Strikeouts: 313
- Saves: 35
- Stats at Baseball Reference

Teams
- Minnesota Twins (2022–2025); Toronto Blue Jays (2025–present)

Career highlights and awards
- All-Star (2026); All-MLB First Team (2026); BBWAA AL Reliever of the Year (2026)

Louis Dennis Varland (born December 9, 1997) is an American professional baseball pitcher for the Toronto Blue Jays of Major League Baseball (MLB). He has previously played in MLB for the Minnesota Twins. Varland was named to his first All-Star game in 2026.

== Career ==
=== Amateur career ===
Varland attended North High Senior School in North St. Paul, Minnesota and played college baseball at the Concordia University, St. Paul. In both 2017 and 2018, he played summer league baseball for the Willmar Stingers of the Northwoods League.

=== Minnesota Twins ===
Varland was selected by the Minnesota Twins in the 15th round of the 2019 Major League Baseball draft.

Varland made his professional debut with the Elizabethton Twins. He did not play in a game in 2020 due to the cancellation of the minor league season because of the COVID-19 pandemic. He returned in 2021 to pitch for the Fort Myers Mighty Mussels and Cedar Rapids Kernels. He was named the Twins minor league pitcher of the year after going 10–4 with a 2.10 earned run average (ERA) and 142 strikeouts.

Varland started 2022 with the Wichita Wind Surge. After posting a 3.34 ERA in 20 games with Wichita, he was promoted to the Triple–A St. Paul Saints. After Jake Jewell was designated for assignment on September 7, Varland was selected to the 40-man roster and promoted to the major leagues for the first time. He made his major league debut that same day in a doubleheader against the New York Yankees. On October 5, Varland earned his first career win after pitching five scoreless innings in a 10–1 victory over the Chicago White Sox. He made five starts for Minnesota during his rookie campaign, posting a 1–2 record and 3.81 ERA with 21 strikeouts over 26 innings of work.

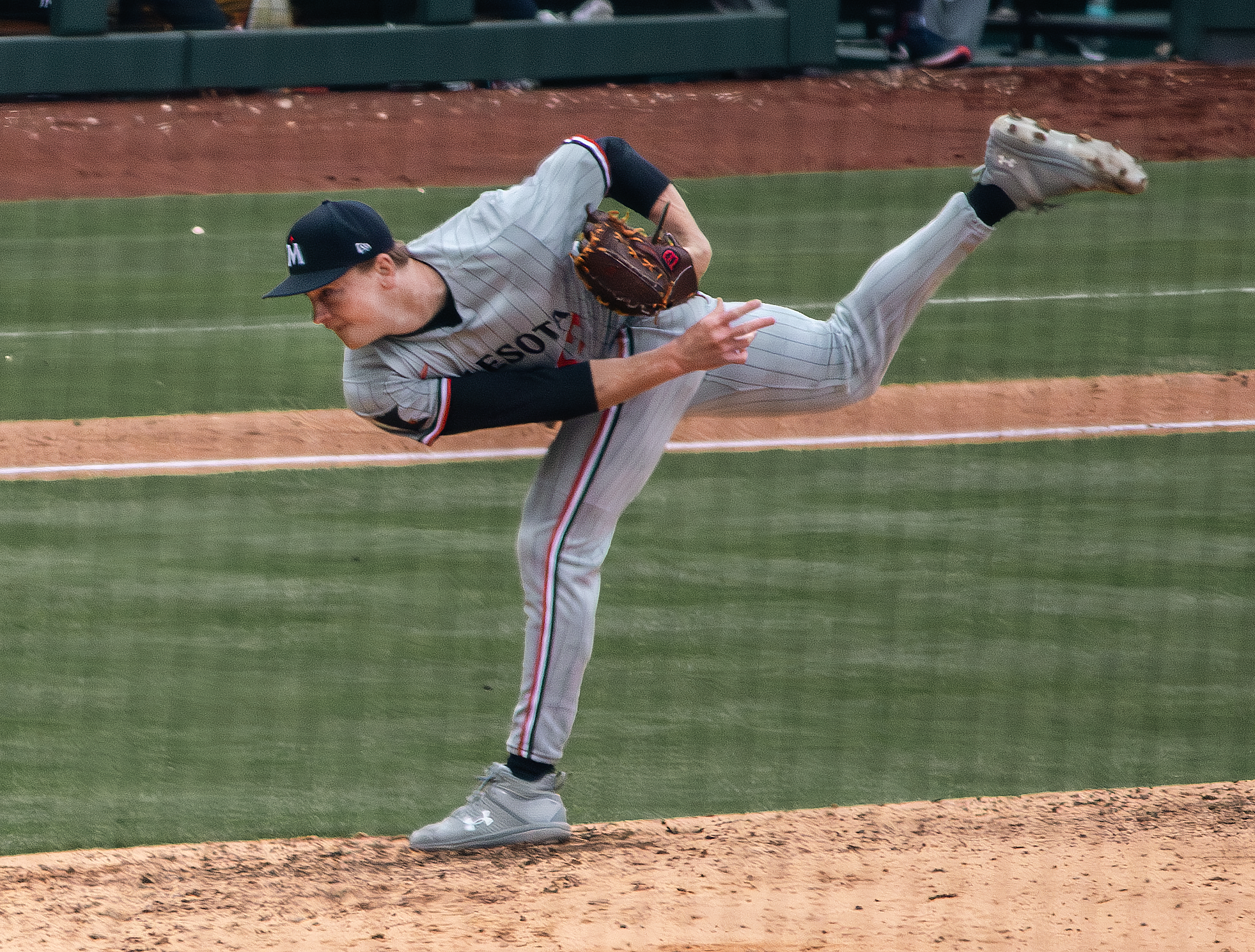
Varland in 2025

Varland was optioned to the Triple-A St. Paul Saints to begin the 2023 season. He went on to make 17 appearances (10 starts) for Minnesota, compiling a 4–3 record and 4.63 ERA with 71 strikeouts over 68 innings of work.

Varland made 16 appearances (seven starts) for the Twins during the 2024 season, but struggled to an 0–6 record and 7.61 ERA with 49 strikeouts across 49 2/3 innings pitched. He made 51 appearances out of the bullpen for Minnesota in 2025, registering a 3–3 record and 2.02 ERA with 47 strikeouts over 49 innings of work.

=== Toronto Blue Jays ===
On July 31, 2025, the Twins traded Varland and Ty France to the Toronto Blue Jays in exchange for Alan Roden and Kendry Rojas. He made 23 appearances for Toronto, pitching to a 1–0 record and 4.94 ERA with 28 strikeouts over 23 2/3 innings pitched. For both teams, Varland made 74 appearances, pitching to a 4–3 record and a 2.97 ERA with 75 strikeouts and 72 2/3 innings pitched.

In the 2025 postseason, Varland appeared in 15 games in relief to set a new record for most appearances by a pitcher in MLB postseason history.

In April 2026, Varland began closing games for the Blue Jays shortly after Jeff Hoffman lost the role due to inconsistency. Varland earned his first career save on April 21, 2026, closing out a 4–2 win over the Los Angeles Angels. Entering the game in the bottom of the ninth inning with one out and the bases loaded, he induced a game-ending double-play on his first and only pitch of the game. He was named the American League Reliever of the Month for March/April 2026. Across 15 innings each in May and June, Varland had a 0.00 ERA with 16 strikeouts and a 2.40 ERA with 22 strikeouts respectively, leading into his first career All-Star Game selection in July.

Varland finished the 2026 season with 74 appearances, pitching 78 innings with a 1.27 ERA, 1.00 WHIP, 97 strikeouts, and 35 saves. He was named the AL Reliever of the Year by the Baseball Writers' Association of America.

== Personal life ==
Varland's brother Gus is also a pitcher in MLB. Although he prefers to go by "Louie", he requested prior to the 2025 season that scoreboards use his given name, "Louis", to honor his family and his namesake uncle.

Awards
Preceded by Cade Smith	American League Reliever of the Month; April 2026	Succeeded by Cade Smith
