= Luke Keaschall =

American baseball player (born 2002)

Minnesota Twins – No. 15
- Utility player
- Born: August 15, 2002 (age 24); Watsonville, California, U.S.
- Bats: Right Throws: Right

MLB debut
- April 18, 2025, for the Minnesota Twins

MLB statistics (through 2026 season)
- Batting average: .287
- Home runs: 14
- Runs batted in: 80
- Stats at Baseball Reference

Teams
- Minnesota Twins (2025–present)

Luke Trevor Keaschall (born August 15, 2002) is an American professional baseball utility player for the Minnesota Twins of Major League Baseball (MLB). He made his MLB debut in 2025.

== Amateur career ==
Keaschall attended Aptos High School in Aptos, California, where he played for the baseball and wrestling teams. His dad was a wrestler at the University of Nebraska, and Luke was one win short of competing in the California State Wrestling Championship in his senior year. He enrolled at the University of San Francisco, where he played college baseball for the San Francisco Dons for two years, earning first team all conference twice in 2021 and 2022 while additionally being named the conferences co-freshman of the year in 2021. In 2021 and 2022, he played collegiate summer baseball with the Orleans Firebirds of the Cape Cod Baseball League and was named a league all-star in 2022. Keaschall transferred to Arizona State University for his junior season where he had a .351 batting average with 18 home runs and 18 stolen bases for the Arizona State Sun Devils. For his efforts in his junior season he was named All Pac-12 Conference and an All-American.

== Professional career ==
The Minnesota Twins selected Keaschall in the second round, with the 49th pick, in the 2023 Major League Baseball draft. On July 21, 2023, he signed with the Twins for $1,500,000. He spent his first professional season with the rookie–level Florida Complex League Twins, Single–A Fort Myers Mighty Mussels, and High–A Cedar Rapids Kernels. In 31 games between the three affiliates, Keaschall slashed .288/.414/.478 with three home runs, 15 RBI, and 11 stolen bases.

Keaschall split 2024 between Cedar Rapids and the Double–A Wichita Wind Surge, playing in 102 games and batting .303/.420/.483 with 15 home runs, 48 RBI, and 23 stolen bases. On August 9, 2024, it was announced that Keaschall would undergo Tommy John surgery, ending his season.

The Twins assigned Keaschall to the Triple-A St. Paul Saints to begin the 2025 season. On April 18, 2025, the Twins promoted Keaschall to the major leagues. On April 25, Keaschall suffered a non-displaced fracture in his right forearm after being hit by a pitch from Los Angeles Angels starter Kyle Hendricks. On August 5, he was activated off of the injured list. On August 11, Keaschall was named the American League Player of the Week for August 4–10, a span in which he batted .455 (10–22) with two runs, two home runs, ten RBI, and an OPS of 1.318. He is only one of 10 players to start his career with an 11-game hitting streak. In 49 appearances for Minnesota during the regular season, he batted .302/.382/.445 with four home runs, 28 RBI, and 14 stolen bases. On October 1, Keaschall underwent surgery to address a lingering thumb injury.
