= Kendry Rojas =

Cuban baseball player (born 2002)

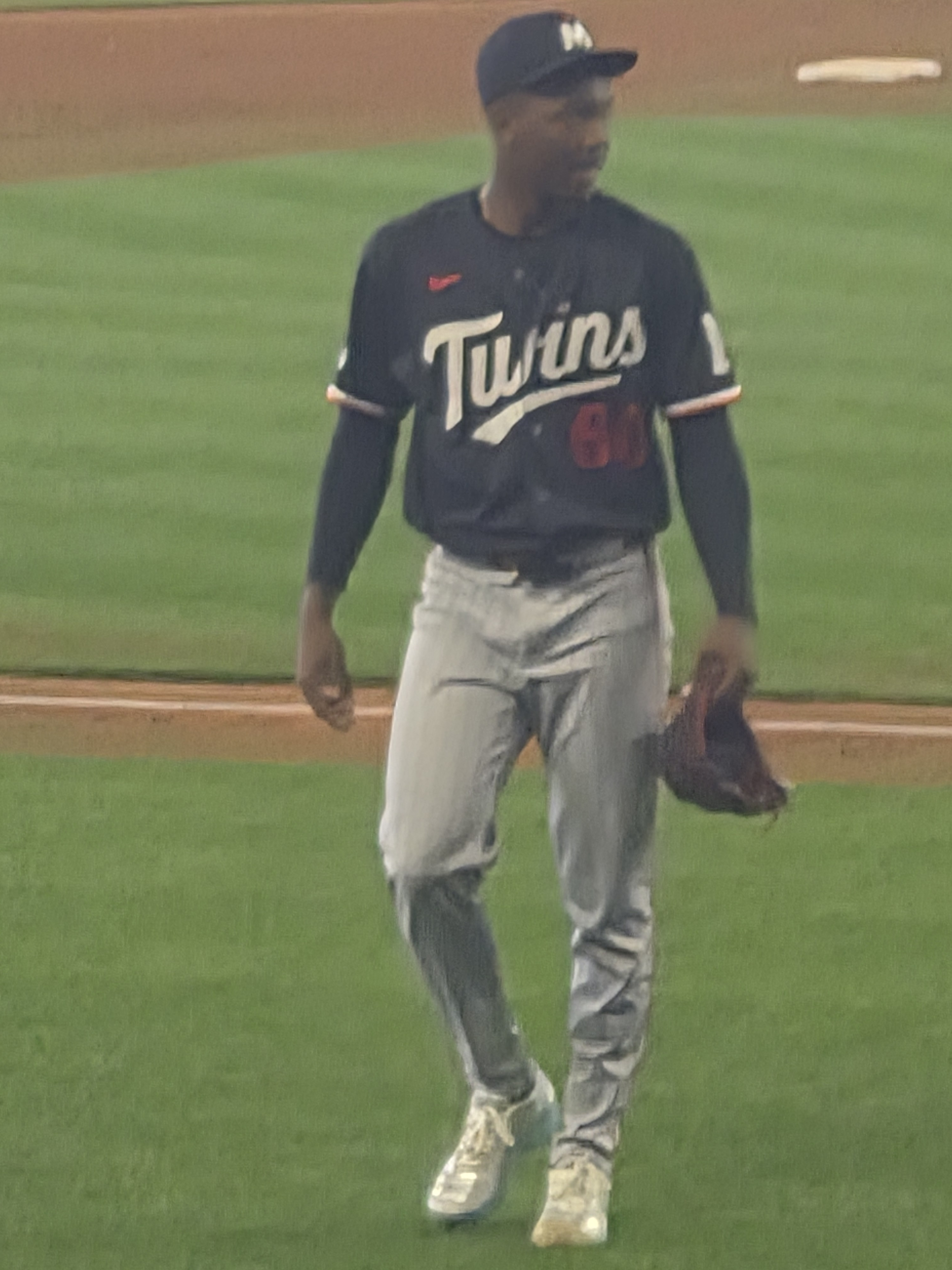
- Rojas with the Minnesota Twins in 2026

Minnesota Twins – No. 60
- Pitcher
- Born: November 26, 2002 (age 23); Ciego de Ávila, Cuba
- Bats: Left Throws: Left

MLB debut
- April 22, 2026, for the Minnesota Twins

MLB statistics (through 2026 season)
- Win–loss record: 1–1
- Earned run average: 3.34
- Strikeouts: 34
- Stats at Baseball Reference

Teams
- Minnesota Twins (2026–present)

Kendry Yoelvis Rojas (born November 26, 2002) is a Cuban professional baseball pitcher for the Minnesota Twins of Major League Baseball (MLB). He made his MLB debut in 2026.

== Career ==
=== Toronto Blue Jays ===
Rojas signed with the Toronto Blue Jays as an international free agent in October 2020. He made his professional debut in 2021 with the Florida Complex League Blue Jays.

Rojas pitched 2022 with the FCL Blue Jays and Dunedin Blue Jays and 2023 with Dunedin. He pitched 2024 with the FCL Blue Jays, Dunedin and Vancouver Canadians. After the season he played in the Arizona Fall League for the Scottsdale Scorpions.

=== Minnesota Twins ===
On July 31, 2025, the Blue Jays traded Rojas and Alan Roden to the Minnesota Twins in exchange for Ty France and Louis Varland. He made eight starts down the stretch for the Triple-A St. Paul Saints, posting a 1–2 record and 6.59 ERA with 28 strikeouts across 27 1/3 innings pitched. On November 18, the Twins added Rojas to their 40-man roster to protect him from the Rule 5 draft.

Rojas was optioned to Triple-A St. Paul to begin the 2026 season. On April 21, 2026, Rojas was promoted to the major leagues for the first time. The next day, he made his debut for the Twins, pitching two scoreless innings against the New York Mets. On May 10, Rojas recorded his first career win, allowing one run across 3 1/3 innings of relief against the Cleveland Guardians. He was optioned back to St. Paul on two more times and spent early June on the 15-day injured list but was recalled to the Twins on July 9.
