= Alan Roden =

American baseball player (born 1999)

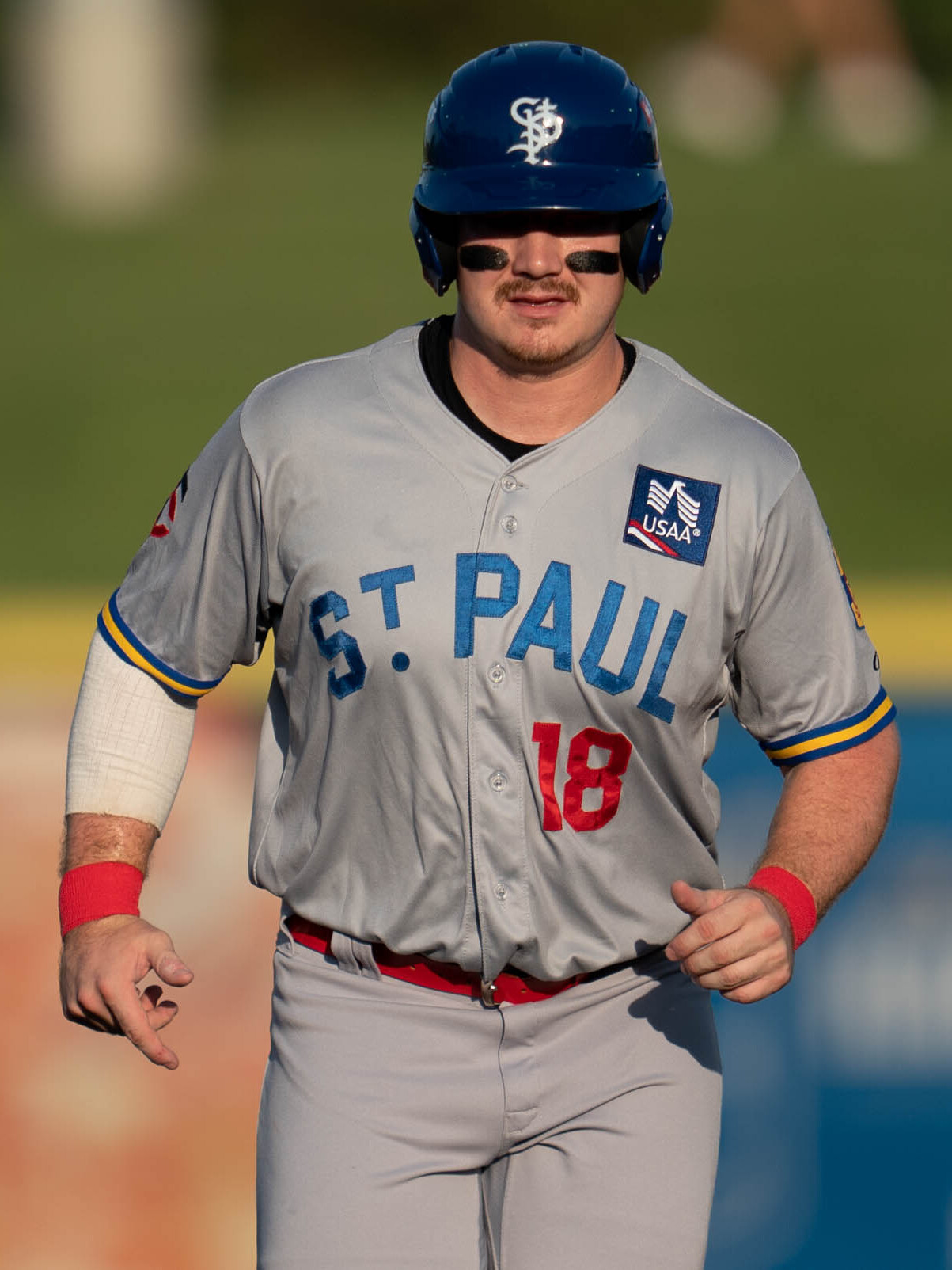
- Roden with the St. Paul Saints in 2026

Minnesota Twins – No. 18
- Outfielder
- Born: December 22, 1999 (age 26); Middleton, Wisconsin, U.S.
- Bats: Left Throws: Right

MLB debut
- March 27, 2025, for the Toronto Blue Jays

MLB statistics (through 2026 season)
- Batting average: .228
- Home runs: 3
- Runs batted in: 23
- Stats at Baseball Reference

Teams
- Toronto Blue Jays (2025); Minnesota Twins (2025–present)

Alan Eric Roden (born December 22, 1999) is an American professional baseball outfielder for the Minnesota Twins of Major League Baseball (MLB). He has previously played in MLB for the Toronto Blue Jays.

== High school and college ==
Roden attended Middleton High School in Middleton, Wisconsin and played college baseball at Creighton University. In 2022, he played collegiate summer baseball with the Wareham Gatemen of the Cape Cod Baseball League. In three years at Creighton, Roden recorded a .383 batting average, 14 home runs, 94 runs batted in (RBI), and 13 stolen bases. He also walked more than he struck out, with 49 and 27 respectively.

He earned a Bachelor of Science in Physics with a concentration in astrophysics from Creighton in 2022. He was a 2020-21 recipient of a NASA Nebraska Space Grant.

== Professional career ==
=== Toronto Blue Jays ===
==== Minor leagues ====
Roden was selected by the Toronto Blue Jays in the third round of the 2022 Major League Baseball draft, and received a $497,500 signing bonus He made his professional debut that year with the Low-A Dunedin Blue Jays, appearing in 25 games and hitting .233 with one home run and nine RBI. He started 2023 with the High-A Vancouver Canadians before being promoted to the Double-A New Hampshire Fisher Cats. In 115 combined games, Roden batted .317 with 10 home runs, 68 RBI, and 24 stolen bases. Roden began the 2024 season with New Hampshire and was later promoted to the Triple-A Buffalo Bisons, where he was named the International League's Player of the Month for August after leading the league in hits with 34. He finished the season with a .293 batting average, 16 home runs, 75 RBI, and 14 stolen bases in 126 games.

==== Major leagues ====
Roden was invited to 2025 spring training by the Blue Jays, and recorded a .423 batting average. On March 23, 2025, manager John Schneider informed Roden he had made the Opening Day roster. His contract was officially selected on March 27. On April 15, Roden hit his first major league home run against the Atlanta Braves in a 6-3 home win. He made 43 appearances for Toronto, batting .204/.283/.306 with one home run and eight RBI.

=== Minnesota Twins ===
On July 31, 2025, the Blue Jays traded Roden and Kendry Rojas to the Minnesota Twins in exchange for Ty France and Louis Varland. In 12 appearances for the Twins, he slashed .158/.200/.263 with one home run, one RBI, and one stolen base. On August 16, Roden was placed on the injured list due to a left thumb sprain; he was transferred to the 60-day injured list the following day, effectively ending his season. On August 20, it was announced that Roden would require surgery to repair a ligament sprain in the injured thumb.

Roden was optioned to the Triple-A St. Paul Saints to begin the 2026 season.
