= Emmanuel Rodríguez (baseball) =

Dominican baseball player (born 2003)

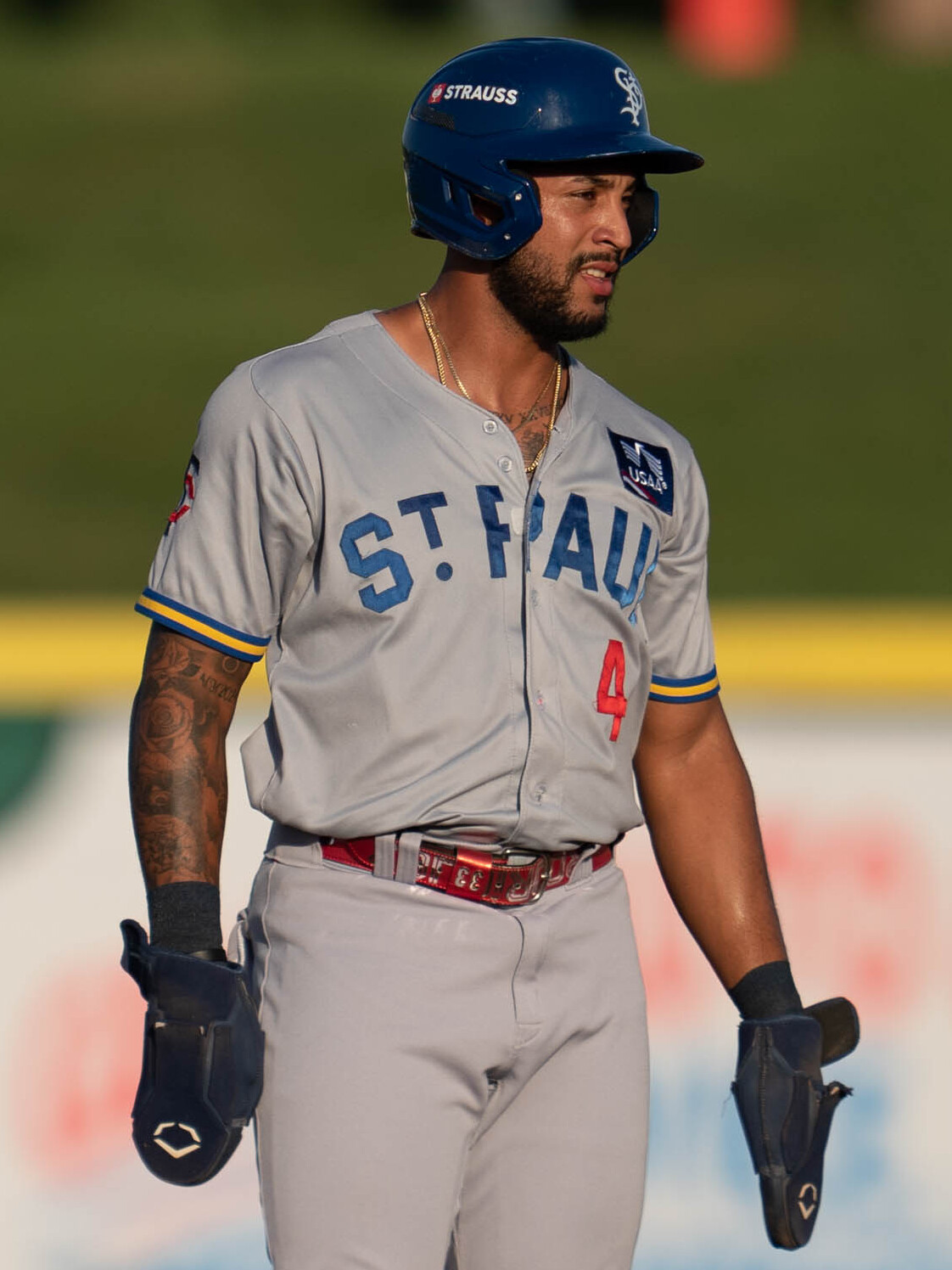
- Rodríguez with the St. Paul Saints in 2026

Minnesota Twins – No. 21
- Outfielder
- Born: February 28, 2003 (age 23); Santiago, Dominican Republic
- Bats: Left Throws: Left

MLB debut
- September 12, 2026, for the Minnesota Twins

MLB statistics (through 2026 season)
- Batting average: .178
- Home runs: 2
- Runs batted in: 5
- Stats at Baseball Reference

Teams
- Minnesota Twins (2026–present)

Emmanuel Rodríguez (born February 28, 2003) is a Dominican professional baseball outfielder for the Minnesota Twins of Major League Baseball (MLB).

== Career ==
Rodríguez signed with the Minnesota Twins as an international free agent on July 2, 2019. He did not play in a game in 2020 due to the cancellation of the minor league season because of the COVID-19 pandemic. Rodríguez made his professional debut in 2021 with the rookie–level Florida Complex League Twins.

In 2022, Rodríguez played in 47 games for the Single–A Fort Myers Mighty Mussels before suffering a season-ending torn meniscus. He spent the 2023 campaign with the High-A Cedar Rapids Kernels, playing in 99 games and hitting .240/.400/.463 with 16 home runs, 55 RBI, and 20 stolen bases.

On November 14, 2023, the Twins added Rodríguez to their 40-man roster to protect him from the Rule 5 draft. He was optioned to the Double–A Wichita Wind Surge to begin the 2024 season. In 37 games for Wichita, Rodríguez slashed .298/.479/.621 with eight home runs, 20 RBI, and nine stolen bases.

Rodríguez was optioned to the Triple-A St. Paul Saints to begin the 2025 season. In 52 appearances for the Saints, Rodríguez slashed .258/.429/.423 with six home runs, 27 RBI, and nine stolen bases.

Rodríguez was again optioned to Triple-A St. Paul to begin the 2026 season. On May 19, 2026, it was announced that Rodríguez would require surgery to repair a torn ulnar collateral ligament in his left thumb. In 49 appearances for the Saints, he slashed .262/.414/.500 with 11 home runs, 33 RBI, and seven stolen bases.

On September 12, 2026, Rodríguez was called up to the major leagues for the first time. In his first major league at-bat, against the Cleveland Guardians, he hit a game-tying home run. He became the seventh Twin to hit a home run in his first career at-bat.
