= Kyler Fedko =

American baseball player (born 1999)

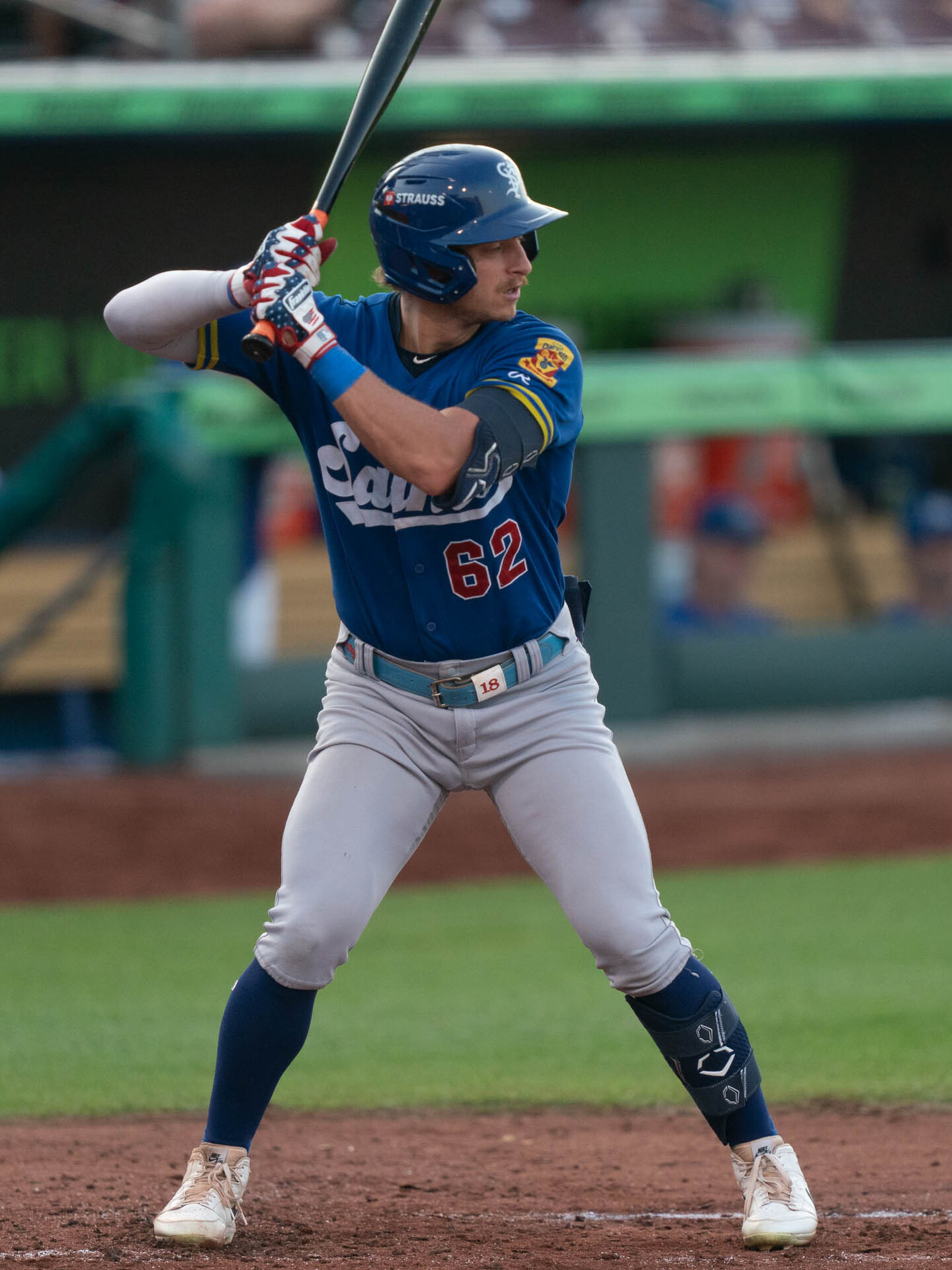
- Fedko with the St. Paul Saints in 2025

Pittsburgh Pirates
- Outfielder
- Born: September 21, 1999 (age 27); Gibsonia, Pennsylvania, U.S.
- Bats: Right Throws: Right

MLB debut
- June 15, 2026, for the Minnesota Twins

MLB statistics (through 2026 season)
- Batting average: .000
- Home run: 0
- Runs batted in: 1
- Stats at Baseball Reference

Teams
- Minnesota Twins (2026)

Kyler John Fedko (born September 21, 1999) is an American professional baseball outfielder in the Pittsburgh Pirates organization. He has previously played in Major League Baseball (MLB) for the Minnesota Twins.

== Amateur career ==
Fedko attended Vincentian Academy in McCandless, Pennsylvania, which won Pennsylvania Interscholastic Athletic Association baseball titles in 2016 and 2018. Fedko was named Pennsylvania high school player of the year by USA Today and high school All-American by MaxPreps.

Fedko played college baseball at the University of Connecticut. In 2019, he played collegiate summer baseball with the Bourne Braves of the Cape Cod Baseball League.

As a UConn sophomore during the 2020 season that was shortened by the COVID-19 pandemic, Fedko had a .412 batting average and .627 slugging percentage in 13 games. Retaining sophomore eligibility for the 2021 season, Fedko hit .398 to lead the Big East Conference, ranking 15th in the National Collegiate Athletic Association. Fedko was named first-team All-American by the National Collegiate Baseball Writers Association.

== Professional career ==
=== Minnesota Twins ===
Fedko was selected by the Minnesota Twins in the 12th round of the 2021 Major League Baseball draft. He made his professional debut that year with the Fort Myers Mighty Mussels.

Fedko played 2022 with Fort Myers and the Cedar Rapids Kernels and 2023 with Cedar Rapids. He played 2024 with the Wichita Wind Surge and started 2025 with Wichita before being promoted to the St. Paul Saints.

Fedko was assigned to Triple-A St. Paul to begin the 2026 season, where he batted .286/.372/.578 with 15 home runs, 45 RBI, and nine stolen bases across his first 58 appearances. On June 14, 2026, Fedko was promoted to the major leagues for the first time. In 14 appearances for Minnesota, he went 0–for–16 with one RBI and two walks. Fedko was designated for assignment by the Twins on September 1. He was released by Minnesota the same day.

=== Pittsburgh Pirates ===
On September 3, 2026, Fedko signed a minor league contract with the Pittsburgh Pirates.
