= Marco Raya =

American baseball player (born 2002)

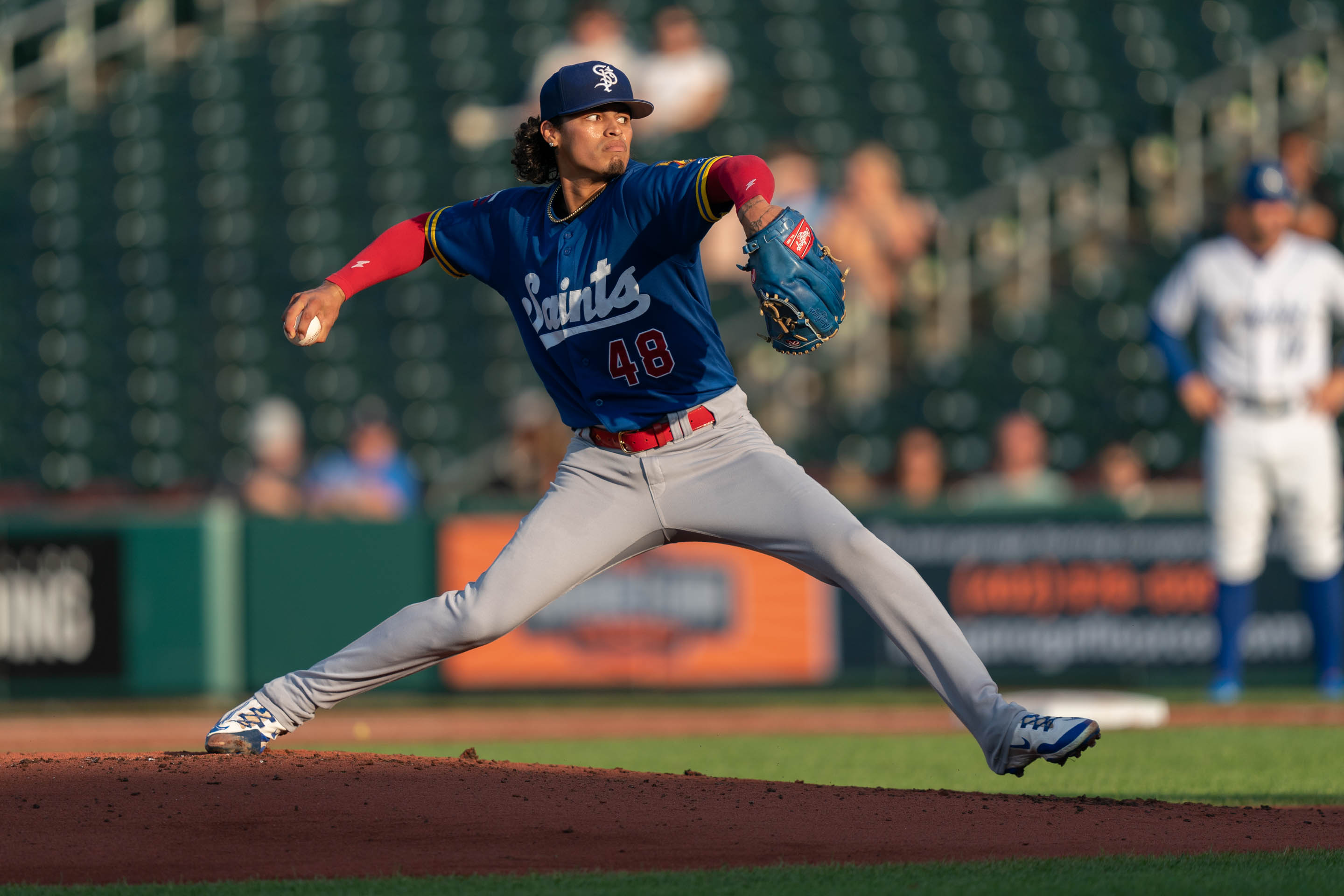
- Raya with the St. Paul Saints in 2025

Minnesota Twins – No. 54
- Pitcher
- Born: August 7, 2002 (age 24); Laredo, Texas, U.S.
- Bats: Right Throws: Right

MLB debut
- June 27, 2026, for the Minnesota Twins

MLB statistics (through 2026 season)
- Win–loss record: 0–0
- Earned run average: 3.00
- Strikeouts: 4
- Stats at Baseball Reference

Teams
- Minnesota Twins (2026–present)

Marco Antonio Raya (born August 7, 2002) is an American professional baseball pitcher for the Minnesota Twins of Major League Baseball (MLB). He debuted in MLB in 2026.

== Amateur career ==
Raya attended United South High School in Laredo, Texas, where he played baseball. He committed to play college baseball at Texas Tech.

== Professional career ==
The Minnesota Twins selected Raya in the fourth round with the 128th overall selection of the 2020 Major League Baseball draft. He signed with the team for $410,000.

Raya did not play in a game in 2020 due to the cancellation of the minor league season because of the COVID-19 pandemic, and did not play in 2021 due to lingering shoulder issues. Raya made his professional debut in 2022 with the Single-A Fort Myers Mighty Mussels. He missed a brief period during the season after getting his wisdom teeth removed. Over 19 games (17 starts) with Fort Myers, he went 3–2 with a 3.05 ERA and 76 strikeouts over 65 innings. Raya opened the 2023 season with the High-A Cedar Rapids Kernels and was promoted to the Double-A Wichita Wind Surge in early July. Over 22 starts between the two teams, Raya went 0–4 with a 4.02 ERA and 65 strikeouts over 62 2/3 innings.

Raya split 2024 between Wichita and the Triple-A St. Paul Saints, compiling a 3–4 record and 4.05 ERA with 103 strikeouts across 97 2/3 innings pitched. Following the season, the Twins added Raya to their 40-man roster to protect him from the Rule 5 draft. He was assigned back to St. Paul for the 2025 season. Over 30 games (20 starts), Raya went 2–8 with a 6.02 ERA and 102 strikeouts over 98 2/3 innings.

Raya was optioned to St. Paul to begin the 2026 season. He began pitching as a reliever after being a starting pitcher in past seasons, posting a 4–4 record and 5.54 ERA with 39 strikeouts across his first 25 appearances prior to his first MLB promotion.

On June 24, 2026, Raya was promoted to the major leagues for the first time. He made his MLB debut on June 27 versus the Colorado Rockies and pitched two innings in relief in which he gave up two runs across two hits, two walks, and one strikeout in an 8-5 Twins loss. On July 8, the Twins placed Raya on the injured list with right shoulder impingement. He was activated on July 25 and subsequently optioned to St. Paul. Raya played the remainder of the season with St. Paul, ending the season with a 5–5 record, a 5.32 ERA, and 73 strikeouts over 64 1/3 innings. With the Twins, he had a 3.00 ERA and four strikeouts across six innings pitched.
