= Aaron Sabato =

American baseball player (born 1999)

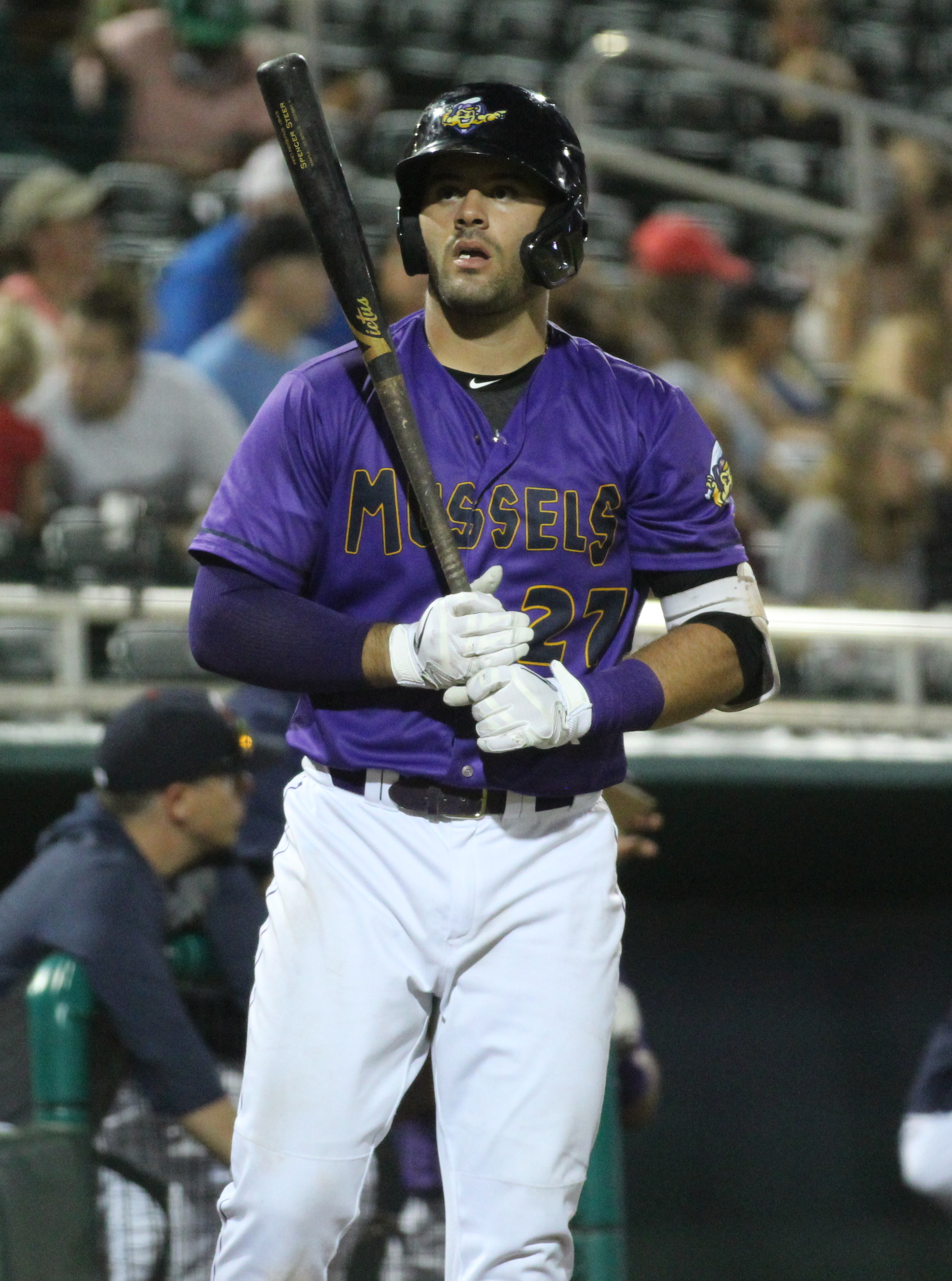
- Sabato in 2021

Free agent
- First baseman
- Born: June 4, 1999 (age 27); Rye Brook, New York, U.S.
- Bats: Right Throws: Right

MLB debut
- September 21, 2026, for the Minnesota Twins

MLB statistics (through 2026 season)
- Batting average: .000
- Home runs: 0
- Runs batted in: 0

Teams
- Minnesota Twins (2026)

Aaron Chase Sabato (born June 4, 1999) is an American professional baseball first baseman who is a free agent. He has previously played in Major League Baseball (MLB) for the Minnesota Twins. He was selected 27th overall by the Twins in the 2020 MLB draft.

== Amateur career ==
Sabato grew up in Rye Brook, New York, and attended the Brunswick School in Greenwich, Connecticut, where he was a four-year starter on the school's baseball team. As a junior he batted .444 with nine home runs, 20 RBI and 20 runs scored. As a senior, he batted .560 with 14 home runs in 22 games and was named first team All-Connecticut.

After graduating, Sabato enrolled at the University of North Carolina at Chapel Hill where he played college baseball. As a true freshman, Sabato led the Tar Heels with a .343 batting average and with 79 hits, 25 doubles and 63 RBIs while setting a UNC freshman record with 18 home runs. He was named the National Freshman Hitter of the Year by the National Collegiate Baseball Writers Association and the Atlantic Coast Conference (ACC) Freshman of the Year, as well as first team All-ACC and as a first team All-American by the American Baseball Coaches Association and a third team All-American by Baseball America.

Sabato entered his sophomore season on the watchlist for the Golden Spikes Award and was named a first team preseason All-American by Baseball America, Perfect Game and the Collegiate Baseball Newspaper. Sabato batted .292 with six doubles, seven home runs and 18 RBIs with 22 walks before the season was cut short due to the coronavirus pandemic.

== Professional career ==
The Minnesota Twins selected Sabato in the first round, with the 27th overall selection, in the 2020 Major League Baseball draft. Sabato signed with the Twins for a $2.75 million bonus. He did not appear for the organization in 2020 due to the cancellation of the minor league season because of the COVID-19 pandemic.

Sabato made his professional debut in 2021 with the Fort Myers Mighty Mussels of the Low-A Southeast and was promoted to the Cedar Rapids Kernels of the High-A Central during the season. Over 107 games between the two teams, he slashed .202/.373/.410 with 19 home runs and 57 RBI. He registered a 32.1% strikeout rate alongside a 19.8% walk rate. Sabato returned to Cedar Rapids to begin the 2022 season. He batted .226 with 17 home runs and 57 RBI in 80 games with the team before being promoted to the Double-A Wichita Wind Surge.

Sabato spent the entirety of the 2023 season with Double-A Wichita, playing in 77 games and batting .221/.329/.430 with 12 home runs and 45 RBI. He split the 2024 campaign between Wichita and Fort Myers, slashing a cumulative .199/.308/.336 with 10 home runs, 33 RBI, and eight stolen bases over 90 total games.

In 2025, Sabato played for the Triple-A St. Paul Saints, Wichita, and Fort Myers. Appearing in 109 games for the three affiliates, he hit a combined .261/.327/.481 with 23 home runs and 68 RBI.

Sabato returned to Triple–A St. Paul in 2026, batting .273/.349/.528 with 25 home runs and 75 RBI across 113 appearances. On September 21, 2026, Sabato was selected to the 40–man roster and promoted to the major leagues for the first time. He made three appearances for Minnesota, going 0–for–6 with three strikeouts. On October 29, Sabato was removed from the 40–man roster and sent outright to Triple–A St. Paul. He elected free agency on November 2.

== Personal ==
Sabato's older brother, Teddy, played college baseball at UNC before transferring to Manhattan College. His father, Ted, is a police officer who played baseball at Mercy College.
