= Cade Smith =

Canadian baseball player (born 1999)

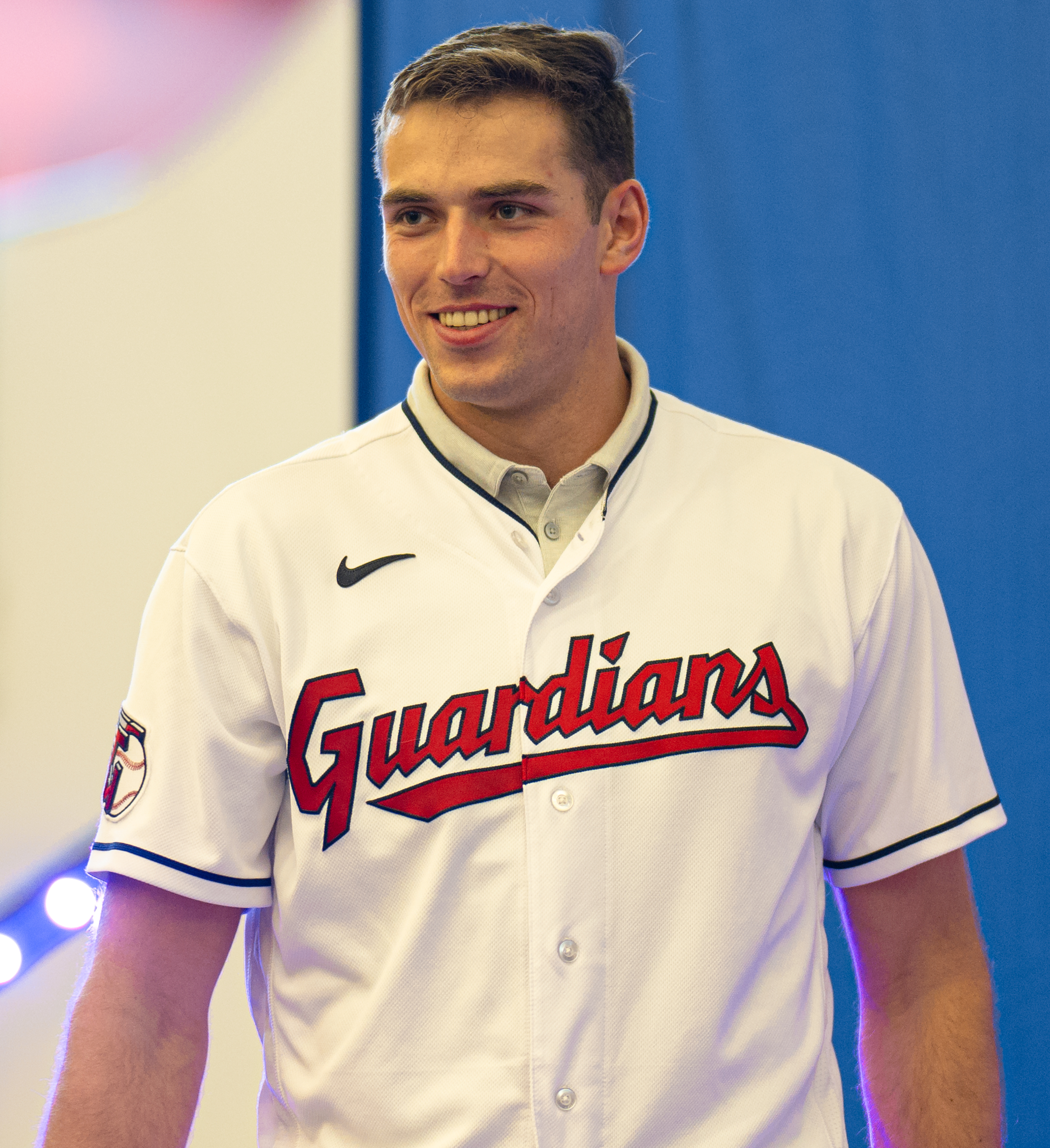
- Smith with the Cleveland Guardians in 2024

Cleveland Guardians – No. 36
- Pitcher
- Born: May 9, 1999 (age 27); Abbotsford, British Columbia, Canada
- Bats: Right Throws: Right

MLB debut
- March 30, 2024, for the Cleveland Guardians

MLB statistics (through 2026 season)
- Win–loss record: 20–7
- Earned run average: 2.26
- Strikeouts: 314
- Saves: 58
- Stats at Baseball Reference

Teams
- Cleveland Guardians (2024–present)

Career highlights and awards
- All-Star (2026); MLB saves leader (2026)

Cade Jared Benjamin Smith (born May 9, 1999) is a Canadian professional baseball pitcher for the Cleveland Guardians of Major League Baseball (MLB). He made his MLB debut in 2024. Smith was named to his first All-Star game in 2026.

== Career ==
Smith attended Mennonite Educational Institute in Abbotsford, British Columbia, Canada. He was drafted by the Minnesota Twins in the 16th round of the 2017 Major League Baseball draft, but did not sign and played college baseball at University of Hawaii at Manoa.

After going undrafted in the 2020 MLB draft, which was shortened due to the COVID-19 pandemic, Smith signed with the Cleveland Indians. He spent his first professional season in 2021, pitching for the Lynchburg Hillcats and Lake County Captains. In 2022, he played for Lake County and Akron RubberDucks. After the season, he pitched in the Arizona Fall League.

In 2023, Smith was selected to play for the Canadian national baseball team in the 2023 World Baseball Classic.

The Guardians selected Smith's contract on November 14, 2023, adding him to their 40-man roster. On March 30, 2024, Smith made his MLB debut, striking out five Oakland Athletics batters in two innings pitched. His performance set a Cleveland record for the most strikeouts in a debut of two innings pitched or fewer. Smith finished his rookie season with a 1.91 ERA and 103 strikeouts in 75 1/3 innings.

Smith made his postseason debut on October 5, striking out all four Detroit Tigers he faced in a 7–0 Cleveland victory in Game 1 of the American League Division Series. Smith fanned 12 of the 22 batters he faced in the ALDS, setting a major league record for strikeouts by a reliever in the Division Series.

In the 2025 season, Smith became one of two replacement closers for the Guardians after Emmanuel Clase was placed on non-disciplinary paid leave as part of an investigation into sports betting by the league on July 28, 2025. During that time, Smith became Cleveland's primary closer as he went a 6–2 record with a 2.79 ERA and 39 strikeouts in 30 games. For the 2025 season, he ended with an 8–5 record with a 2.93 ERA and 104 strikeouts in 76 games. He also became the American League Reliever of the Month for September as he saved seven games, tied for the most in AL, including saves in six straight appearances from Sept. 6-14. He ended the month with a 2.77 ERA and 22 strikeouts in 13 innings.

In 2026, Smith posted a 1.95 ERA and 107 strikeouts over 69 games, finishing tied for the league lead with 41 saves.

== Pitching style ==
Smith is notable for his high strikeout rates. He primarily throws a four-seam fastball that averages around 96 mph. His main secondary pitch is a splitter, and he also mixes in a sweeper on occasion. He is also known for his elite extension, among the highest in Major League Baseball, which allows him to release the ball closer to home plate, making his velocity appear even faster to hitters. In addition, his release point is lower than league average, creating a deceptive angle that makes his fastball appear to rise more than expected.

== Personal life ==
Smith is married to Elizabeth, an American. He is a Christian. He grew up as a fan of the Toronto Blue Jays.

Awards and achievements
Preceded by Aroldis Chapman; Louis Varland; Josh Hader	American League Reliever of the Month; September 2025; May 2026; September 2026	Succeeded by Louis Varland; Jacob Latz; Most recent
