= Cody Laweryson =

American baseball player (born 1998)

Free agent
- Pitcher
- Born: May 10, 1998 (age 28); Bingham, Maine, U.S.
- Bats: Left Throws: Right

MLB debut
- September 13, 2025, for the Minnesota Twins

MLB statistics (through 2026 season)
- Win–loss record: 1–1
- Earned run average: 3.70
- Strikeouts: 25
- Stats at Baseball Reference

Teams
- Minnesota Twins (2025–2026)

Cody Orion Laweryson (/ˈlɔːrəsən/ LAW-rə-sən; born May 10, 1998) is an American professional baseball pitcher who is a free agent. He made his Major League Baseball (MLB) debut in 2025.

== Career ==
Laweryson played college baseball at the University of Maine. He was drafted by the Minnesota Twins in the 14th round, with the 419th overall selection, of the 2019 Major League Baseball draft. Laweryson split his first professional season between the rookie-level Elizabethton Twins and Single-A Cedar Rapids Kernels, posting a combined 1.57 ERA with 63 strikeouts in 11 games (seven starts). He did not play in a game in 2020 due to the cancellation of the minor league season because of the COVID-19 pandemic.

Laweryson returned to action in 2021 with Cedar Rapids. He made 15 appearances (14 starts) for the team, logging a 2-5 record and 4.91 ERA with 73 strikeouts across 58 2/3 innings pitched. Laweryson split the 2022 season between Cedar Rapids and the Double-A Wichita Wind Surge, accumulating a 6-0 record and 1.62 ERA with 111 strikeouts and one save across 35 total games (10 starts).

In 2023, Laweryson made 32 appearances (four starts) for the Triple-A St. Paul Saints, pitching to a 3-4 record and 4.80 ERA with 51 strikeouts across 50 2/3 innings. He returned to Wichita for the 2024 season, registering a 2-2 record and 6.82 ERA with 33 strikeouts and three saves in 33 innings pitched across 27 games.

Laweryson began the 2025 season with the Double-A Wichita Wind Surge, and later received a promotion to the Triple-A St. Paul Saints; in 34 appearances for the two affiliates, he accumulated a 2-4 record and 2.86 ERA with 45 strikeouts and six saves. On September 12, 2025, Laweryson was selected to the 40-man roster and promoted to the major leagues for the first time. He would make his debut the next day against the Arizona Diamondbacks, recording two strikeouts in two innings. Laweryson made five appearances for Minnesota during his rookie campaign, recording an 0-1 record and 1.17 ERA with seven strikeouts across 7 2/3 innings pitched.

On November 6, 2025, Laweryson was claimed off waivers by the Los Angeles Angels. He was designated for assignment by the Angels on February 2, 2026. Laweryson was released by Los Angeles on February 6. He returned to the Twins organization on a minor league contract on February 14. On March 25, Minnesota selected Laweryson's contract after he made the team's Opening Day roster. On June 21, Laweryson recorded his first career win, tossing a scoreless inning of relief against the Arizona Diamondbacks. He made 15 appearances for the Twins, compiling a 1–0 record and 4.86 ERA with 18 strikeouts and one save across 16 2/3 innings pitched. Laweryson was designated for assignment by Minnesota on August 1. He was released by the Twins on August 4, but re–signed with the organization on a minor league contract on August 8. He elected free agency on November 2.
