= Florida Complex League Twins =

- (1965–1971, 1989–present); Fort Myers, Florida

Minor league affiliations
- Class: Rookie
- League: Florida Complex League
- Division: Southern Division
- Previous leagues: Gulf Coast League (1966–1971; 1989–2020); Florida Rookie League (1965)

Major league affiliations
- Team: Minnesota Twins

Minor league titles
- League titles (0): None
- Division titles (2): 2007; 2009

Team data
- Name: FCL Twins
- Previous names: GCL Twins (1966–1971; 1989–2020); FRL Twins (1965)
- Ballpark: Lee County Sports Complex
- Owner/ Operator: Minnesota Twins
- General manager: Tom Saffell
- Manager: Robbie Robinson

The Florida Complex League Twins are the Rookie-level affiliate of the Minnesota Twins, competing in the Florida Complex League of Minor League Baseball. The team plays in Fort Myers, Florida, at the Lee County Sports Complex. Prior to 2021, the team was known as the Gulf Coast League Twins. The team is composed mainly of players who are in their first year of professional baseball either as draftees or non-drafted free agents from the United States, Canada, Dominican Republic, Venezuela and other countries.

== History ==
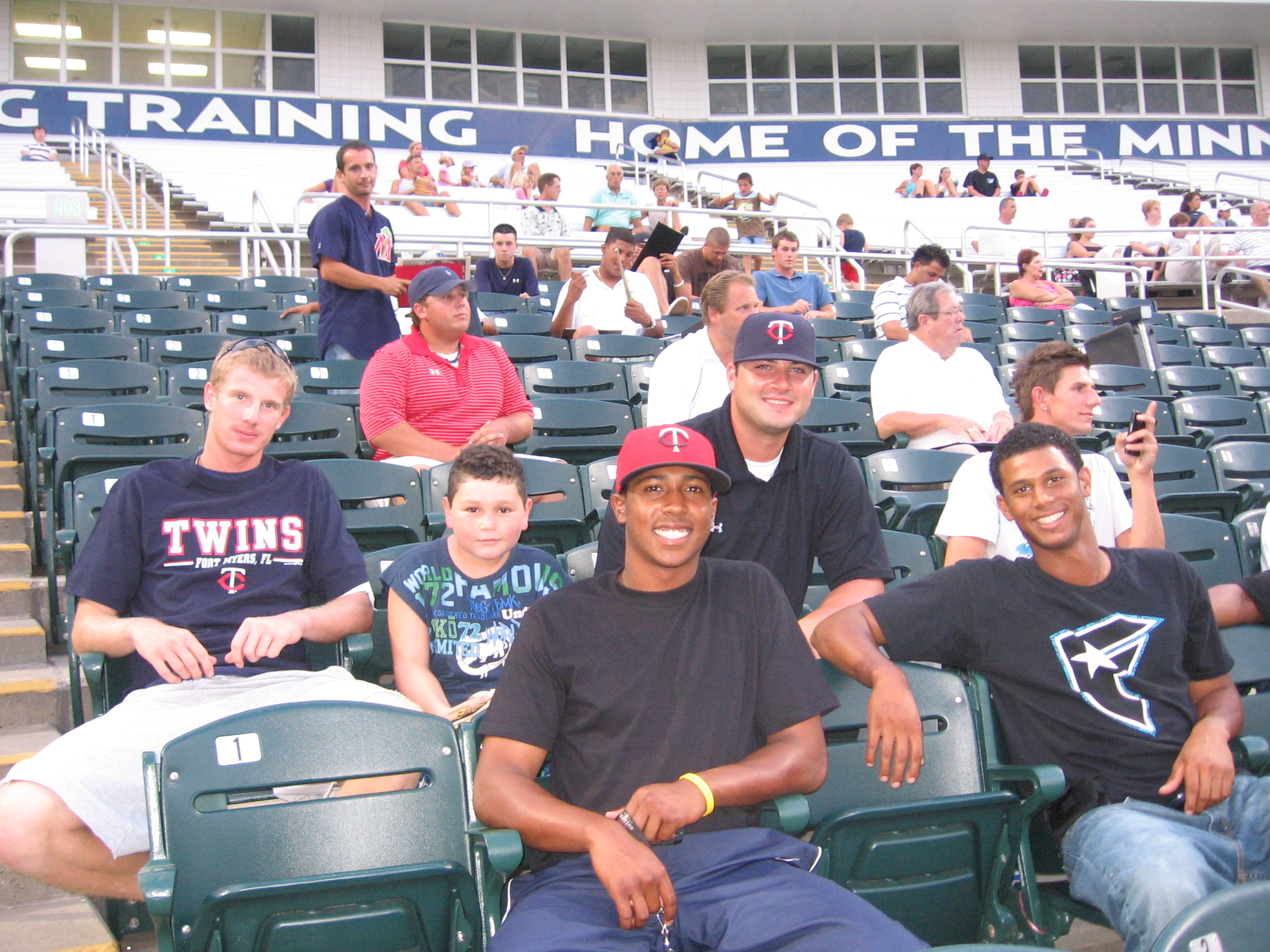
Four players from the 2008 GCL Twins and a fan smile for a picture

In 1965, the team first played in the league's first embodiment, the Florida Rookie League, as the Florida Rookie League Twins. The league was renamed as the Gulf Coast League for the 1966 season. The team suspended operations after the 1971 season, but returned to the GCL in 1989. Prior to the 2021 season, the league was again renamed, becoming the Florida Complex League.

The Twins compete in the league's Southern Division. In 2009, the Twins won the South with a 34–21 record under manager Jake Mauer, the older brother of former Minnesota Twins catcher Joe Mauer. They lost 1–0 in twelve innings to the wild card winning GCL Nationals in the one game playoff. Following the season, Mauer was promoted to manager of the Florida State League Fort Myers Miracle, and Chris Heintz took the reins for the Twins. Like Mauer, Heintz was also a player in the Twins organization. He coached with the Beloit Snappers the final two months of the 2009 season. In addition to managing the Rookie-level club, Heintz also ran the Twins' extended spring training.

On July 25, 2010, it was announced that Tom Brunansky, member of the 1987 Twin's championship team, accepted a job to be the hitting coach for the team.

As of the 2021 season, there is no league limit to how many players can be on an active roster, but no team can have more than three players with four or more years of minor-league experience.

== Roster ==
Florida Complex League Twins roster
| Players | | Coaches/Other |
|---|---|---|
| Pitchers: -- Hagan Banks; -- Michael Barnett; -- Alec Bouchard; 47 Santiago Castellanos; 56 Frederick Hiciano; 60 Yordi Jose; -- Kole Klecker; -- Ethan Lay; -- Tommy LaPour; -- Connor Mattison; -- Colter McAnelly; 61 Omar Montano; -- Steele Murdock; -- Ryne Palmer; -- JT Raab; -- Brett Renfrow; 21 Yoel Roque; 50 Geremy Villoria; -- Ethan Wachsmann | Catchers: 24 Miguel Caraballo; 48 Pablo Castillo; -- Victor Leal; 33 Daniel Pena; Infielders: 67 Darwin Almanzar; 38 Jose Barrios; 23 Daiber De Los Santos; -- PJ Moutzouridis; Outfielders: 11 Joyner Perez; 1 Teilon Serrano; 22 Carlos Taveras | Manager: 86 Tristan Toorie; Coaches: 8 Steve Cardona (hitting); 96 Emilio Guerrero (hitting); 97 Matthew Hartshorn (pitching); 94 Carter Kessinger (pitching); 98 Ryan Meisinger (pitching); 35 Jairo Rodriguez (development); 99 Dan Urbina (pitching); 60-day injured list: 25 Haritzon Castillo; 93 Santiago Leon (full season); 52 Rey Pacheco; 92 Anderson Ramos (full season); 7-day injured list; * On Minnesota Twins 40-man roster; ~ Development list; # Rehab assignment; ∞ Reserve list; ‡ Restricted list; § Suspended list; † Temporarily inactive list; Roster updated October 13, 2026; Transactions; → More rosters: MiLB • Florida Complex League; → Minnesota Twins minor league players |

== Season-by-season ==
| Year | Record | Finish | Manager | Playoffs |
|---|---|---|---|---|
FRL Twins
| 1965 | 32-28 | 3rd | Fred Waters | No playoffs |
GCL Twins
| 1966 | 24–24 | 3rd | Fred Waters | No playoffs until 1983 |
| 1967 | 29–29 | 3rd | Fred Waters | |
| 1968 | 32–27 | 4th | Fred Waters | |
| 1969 | 21–32 | 6th | Fred Waters | |
| 1970 | 34–29 | 4th | Fred Waters | |
| 1971 | 22–30 | 5th | Fred Waters | |
| 1989 | 27–36 | 10th (t) | Joel Lepel | |
| 1990 | 32–30 | 8th (t) | Joel Lepel | |
| 1991 | 27–33 | 12th (t) | Dan Rohn | |
| 1992 | 30–28 | 7th | Jim Lemon | |
| 1993 | 23–36 | 12th | Jose Marzan | |
| 1994 | 22–38 | 13th | Jose Marzan | |
| 1995 | 20–35 | 14th | Mike Boulanger | |
| 1996 | 30–30 | 9th | Mike Boulanger | |
| 1997 | 28–32 | 8th | Steve Liddle | |
| 1998 | 34-26 | 3rd (t) | Steve Liddle | Lost in 1st round vs. GCL Rangers (1 game to 0) |
| 1999 | 33–26 | 3rd | Al Newman | Lost League Finals vs. GCL Mets (2 games to 0); Won in 1st round vs. GCL Rangers (1 game to 0) |
| 2000 | 33–23 | 4th | Al Newman | |
| 2001 | 32–26 | 6th | Al Newman | |
| 2002 | 35–25 | 4th | Rudy Hernandez | |
| 2003 | 28–31 | 7th | Rudy Hernandez | |
| 2004 | 31–26 | 5th | Riccardo Ingram | |
| 2005 | 28–26 | 4th (t) | Nelson Prada | |
| 2006 | 26–27 | 7th | Nelson Prada | |
| 2007 | 37–19 | 3rd | Nelson Prada | Lost in 1st round vs. GCL Yankees (1 game to 0) |
| 2008 | 35–21 | 2nd | Jake Mauer | Lost in 1st round vs. GCL Nationals (1 game to 0) |
| 2009 | 34–21 | 3rd | Jake Mauer | Lost in 1st round vs. GCL Nationals (1 game to 0) |
| 2010 | 29–31 | 10th (t) | Chris Heintz (2–5) / Ramon Borrego (27–26) | |
| 2011 | 31–29 | 6th | Ramon Borrego | |
| 2012 | 33–27 | 6th | Ramon Borrego | |
| 2013 | 28–32 | 8th (t) | Ramon Borrego | |
| 2014 | 23–37 | 14th (t) | Ramon Borrego | |
| 2015 | 27–32 | 9th (t) | Ramon Borrego | |
| 2016 | 32–29 | 6th | Ramon Borrego | |
| 2017 | 35–23 | 3rd | Ramon Borrego | Lost in 1st round vs. GCL Nationals (1 game to 0) |
| 2018 | 32–24 | 5th | Dan Ramsay | |
| 2019 | 30–21 | 4th | Robbie Robinson | Playoffs cancelled due to Hurricane Dorian |
FCL Twins
| 2021 | 21-38 | 7th – FCL South | Takashi Miyoshi | |
| 2022 | 25-30 | 4th – FCL South | Seth Feldman | |
| 2023 | 25-29 | 4th – FCL South | Seth Feldman | |
| 2024 | 28-31 | 4th – FCL South | Seth Feldman | |
| 2025 | 39-20 | 1st – FCL South | Nico Giarratano | Lost League Finals vs. FCL Blue Jays (2 games to 0) Won in 1st round vs. FCL Tigers (1 game to 0) |
| 2026 | 33-26 | 3rd – FCL South | Tristan Toorie | |
