= 2026 Cleveland Guardians season =

2026 Cleveland Guardians
- American League Central champions
- League: American League
- Division: Central
- Ballpark: Progressive Field
- City: Cleveland, Ohio
- Record: 85–77 (.525)
- Divisional place: 1st
- Owners: Paul Dolan
- President of baseball operations: Chris Antonetti
- General managers: Mike Chernoff
- Manager: Stephen Vogt
- Television: MLB Local Media (Matt Underwood, Rick Manning, Chris Gimenez, Andre Knott, Al Pawlowski, Jensen Lewis, Pat Tabler)
- Radio: English: WTAM · WMMS (Tom Hamilton, Jim Rosenhaus, Tim Belcher, Charles Nagy, Pat Tabler); Spanish: WARF (Rafa Hernández-Brito, Carlos Baerga)

The 2026 Cleveland Guardians season was the 126th season for the franchise, which competes in the American League of Major League Baseball (MLB). The team's win over the San Diego Padres on August 15 was the 10,000th regular season win in franchise history; the Guardians became the third American League team to reach the mark.

On September 24, the Guardians clinched their third consecutive postseason berth with a 1–0 win over the Boston Red Sox.

On September 26, the penultimate day of the season, the Guardians clinched their third-straight American League Central division title with an 11–5 win over the Kansas City Royals combined with the Chicago White Sox's 9–6 loss to the Colorado Rockies. Much like the previous season, the Guardians staged a turnaround after being as much as seven games out of first place in July and having a 61–66 record on August 19.

In their Division Series matchup against the White Sox, the Guardians became the first team since the 2017 New York Yankees (coincidentally against Cleveland) and the 11th in MLB history to come back from an 0–2 deficit in a best-of-five series, defeating the White Sox in five games and advancing to the American League Championship Series, where they would wind up losing in 6 games to the Tampa Bay Rays, ending their season.

== Regular season ==
=== Standings ===
==== American League Central ====
AL Central
Team	W	L	Pct.	GB	Home	Road
Cleveland Guardians	85	77	.525	—	41‍–‍40	44‍–‍37
Chicago White Sox	84	78	.519	1	48‍–‍33	36‍–‍45
Minnesota Twins	77	85	.475	8	42‍–‍39	35‍–‍46
Detroit Tigers	76	86	.469	9	42‍–‍39	34‍–‍47
Kansas City Royals	69	93	.426	16	41‍–‍40	28‍–‍53

==== American League Wild Card ====
Division leaders
Team	W	L	Pct.
Tampa Bay Rays	98	64	.605
Cleveland Guardians	85	77	.525
Houston Astros	81	81	.500

Wild Card teams (Top 3 teams qualify for postseason)
Team	W	L	Pct.	GB
New York Yankees	93	68	.578	+9½
Boston Red Sox	87	75	.537	+3
Chicago White Sox	84	78	.519	—
Texas Rangers	80	82	.494	4
Baltimore Orioles	79	82	.491	4½
Toronto Blue Jays	79	83	.488	5
Minnesota Twins	77	85	.475	7
Detroit Tigers	76	86	.469	8
Seattle Mariners	76	86	.469	8
Kansas City Royals	69	93	.426	15
Athletics	64	98	.395	20
Los Angeles Angels	62	100	.383	22

==== Record against opponents ====
2026 American League record Source: MLB Standings Grid – 2026
Team	ATH	BAL	BOS	CWS	CLE	DET	HOU	KC	LAA	MIN	NYY	SEA	TB	TEX	TOR	NL
Athletics	—	2–4	3–4	1–5	1–5	0–6	6–7	2–5	8–5	3–3	3–3	7–6	0–6	7–6	2–4	19–29
Baltimore	4–2	—	4–9	4–2	3–4	4–2	5–1	5–1	3–3	3–3	3–9	3–4	8–5	2–4	7–6	21–27
Boston	4–3	9–4	—	6–0	3–3	5–2	1–5	5–1	4–2	1–5	6–7	3–3	6–7	3–3	4–9	27–21
Chicago	5–1	2–4	0–6	—	7–6	9–4	2–5	9–4	4–2	8–5	3–4	3–3	2–4	4–2	5–1	21–27
Cleveland	5–1	4–3	3–3	6–7	—	10–3	2–4	7–6	6–0	6–7	2–4	4–3	1–5	2–4	2–4	25–23
Detroit	6–0	2–4	2–5	4–9	3–10	—	2–5	6–7	3–3	5–8	4–2	4–2	4–2	4–2	3–3	24–24
Houston	7–6	1–5	5–1	5–2	4–2	5–2	—	4–2	7–6	2–4	3–3	3–10	2–4	9–4	3–3	21–27
Kansas City	5–2	1–5	1–5	4–9	6–7	7–6	2–4	—	5–1	8–5	0–6	5–1	2–5	1–5	3–3	19–29
Los Angeles	5–8	3–3	2–4	2–4	0–6	3–3	6–7	1–5	—	3–4	3–4	6–7	3–3	8–5	2–4	15–33
Minnesota	3–3	3–3	5–1	5–8	7–6	8–5	4–2	5–8	4–3	—	3–3	2–4	1–5	5–1	4–3	18–30
New York	3–3	9–3	7–6	4–3	4–2	2–4	3–3	6–0	4–3	3–3	—	4–2	6–7	4–2	7–6	27–21
Seattle	6–7	4–3	3–3	3–3	3–4	2–4	10–3	1–5	7–6	4–2	2–4	—	1–5	5–8	2–4	23–25
Tampa Bay	6–0	5–8	7–6	4–2	5–1	2–4	4–2	5–2	3–3	5–1	7–6	5–1	—	4–3	9–4	27–21
Texas	6–7	4–2	3–3	2–4	4–2	2–4	4–9	5–1	5–8	1–5	2–4	8–5	3–4	—	6–1	25–23
Toronto	4–2	6–7	9–4	1–5	4–2	3–3	3–3	3–3	4–2	3–4	6–7	4–2	4–9	1–6	—	24–24

Updated with the results of all games through September 27, 2026.

==== Game log ====
2026 Game Log: 85–77 (Home: 41–40; Road: 44–37)
March/April: 16–16 (Home: 9–7; Road: 7–9)

#	Date	Opponent	Score	Win	Loss	Save	Attendance	Record	Streak
1	March 26	@ Mariners	6–4	Brogdon (1–0)	Speier (0–1)	Smith (1)	44,938	1–0	W1
2	March 27	@ Mariners	1–5	Kirby (1–0)	Williams (0–1)	—	36,987	1–1	L1
3	March 28	@ Mariners	6–5 (10)	Smith (1–0)	Muñoz (0–1)	Brogdon (1)	43,283	2–1	W1
4	March 29	@ Mariners	0–8	Hancock (1–0)	Cecconi (0–1)	Criswell (1)	30,800	2–2	L1
5	March 30	@ Dodgers	4–2	Messick (1–0)	Sasaki (0–1)	—	52,173	3–2	W1
6	March 31	@ Dodgers	1–4	Ohtani (1–0)	Bibee (0–1)	—	53,614	3–3	L1
7	April 1	@ Dodgers	4–1	Williams (1–1)	Yamamoto (1–1)	—	45,556	4–3	W1
8	April 3	Cubs	4–1	Brogdon (2–0)	Harvey (0–1)	Smith (2)	37,360	5–3	W2
—	April 4	Cubs	Postponed (rain) (Makeup date: April 5)						
9	April 5 (1)	Cubs	0–1	Thielbar (1–0)	Brogdon (2–1)	Palencia (1)	see 2nd game	5–4	L1
10	April 5 (2)	Cubs	6–5	Armstrong (1–0)	Webb (0–1)	Smith (3)	19,791	6–4	W1
11	April 6	Royals	2–4	Wacha (1–0)	Pallette (0–1)	Erceg (3)	13,143	6–5	L1
12	April 7	Royals	2–1	Smith (2–0)	Schreiber (0–1)	—	10,328	7–5	W1
13	April 8	Royals	10–2	Cantillo (1–0)	Ragans (0–3)	Festa (1)	14,734	8–5	W2
14	April 10	@ Braves	5–11	Kinley (2–0)	Cecconi (0–2)	—	40,363	8–6	L1
15	April 11	@ Braves	6–0	Messick (2–0)	Pérez (0–1)	—	40,195	9–6	W1
16	April 12	@ Braves	1–13	Sale (3–1)	Bibee (0–2)	Dodd (1)	29,084	9–7	L1
17	April 13	@ Cardinals	9–3	Williams (2–1)	Liberatore (0–1)	—	17,901	10–7	W1
18	April 14	@ Cardinals	5–6 (10)	O'Brien (2–0)	Herrin (0–1)	—	20,772	10–8	L1
19	April 15	@ Cardinals	3–5	May (2–2)	Brogdon (2–2)	O'Brien (5)	22,642	10–9	L2
20	April 16	Orioles	4–2	Messick (3–0)	Baz (0–2)	Smith (4)	14,748	11–9	W1
21	April 17	Orioles	4–6	Garcia (2–0)	Sabrowski (0–1)	Helsley (6)	23,988	11–10	L1
22	April 18	Orioles	4–2	Williams (3–1)	Kremer (0–1)	Smith (5)	20,783	12–10	W1
23	April 19	Orioles	8–4	Festa (1–0)	Rogers (2–2)	—	17,408	13–10	W2
24	April 20	Astros	2–9	Arrighetti (2–0)	Cecconi (0–3)	—	12,565	13–11	L1
25	April 21	Astros	8–5	Pallette (1–1)	De Los Santos (0–1)	—	15,448	14–11	W1
26	April 22	Astros	0–2	Lambert (1–1)	Bibee (0–3)	De Los Santos (3)	15,722	14–12	L1
27	April 24	@ Blue Jays	8–6	Williams (4–1)	Scherzer (1–3)	Smith (6)	41,671	15–12	W1
28	April 25	@ Blue Jays	3–5	Gausman (2–1)	Cantillo (1–1)	Varland (2)	41,543	15–13	L1
29	April 26	@ Blue Jays	2–4	Fisher (1–0)	Cecconi (0–4)	Varland (3)	41,136	15–14	L2
30	April 27	Rays	2–3	Matz (4–1)	Gaddis (0–1)	Baker (7)	18,029	15–15	L3
31	April 28	Rays	0–1	Martinez (2–1)	Bibee (0–4)	Sulser (1)	16,213	15–16	L4
32	April 29	Rays	3–1	Williams (5–1)	Rasmussen (2–1)	Smith (7)	14,196	16–16	W1

May: 18–11 (Home: 8–7; Road: 10–4)

#	Date	Opponent	Score	Win	Loss	Save	Attendance	Record	Streak
33	May 1	@ Athletics	8–5	Sabrowski (1–1)	Ginn (0–1)	Smith (8)	12,122	17–16	W2
34	May 2	@ Athletics	14–6	Cecconi (1–4)	Lopez (2–2)	—	11,390	18–16	W3
35	May 3	@ Athletics	1–7	Civale (3–1)	Messick (3–1)	—	12,194	18–17	L1
36	May 4	@ Royals	2–6	Wacha (3–2)	Bibee (0–5)	—	16,434	18–18	L2
37	May 5	@ Royals	3–5	Kolek (1–0)	Williams (5–2)	Erceg (10)	13,102	18–19	L3
38	May 6	@ Royals	3–1	Cantillo (2–1)	Avila (0–2)	Smith (9)	13,039	19–19	W1
39	May 7	@ Royals	8–5	Cecconi (2–4)	Lugo (1–2)	Smith (10)	24,892	20–19	W2
40	May 8	Twins	6–4	Messick (4–1)	Prielipp (1–1)	Smith (11)	19,030	21–19	W3
41	May 9	Twins	1–2 (11)	Orze (1–1)	Pallette (1–2)	García (1)	28,230	21–20	L1
42	May 10	Twins	4–5	Rojas (1–0)	Williams (5–3)	Gómez (2)	22,475	21–21	L2
43	May 11	Angels	7–2	Cantillo (3–1)	Suter (1–2)	—	15,492	22–21	W1
44	May 12	Angels	3–2	Gaddis (1–1)	Ureña (1–4)	Smith (12)	16,355	23–21	W2
45	May 13	Angels	4–2	Messick (5–1)	Detmers (1–4)	Smith (13)	21,142	24–21	W3
46	May 15	Reds	6–7	Abbott (3–2)	Bibee (0–6)	Antone (1)	27,903	24–22	L1
47	May 16	Reds	7–4	Sabrowski (2–1)	Moll (1–3)	Smith (14)	33,331	25–22	W1
48	May 17	Reds	10–3	Williams (6–3)	Singer (2–4)	—	27,388	26–22	W2
49	May 18	@ Tigers	8–2	Cecconi (3–4)	Valdez (2–3)	—	18,913	27–22	W3
50	May 19	@ Tigers	4–3	Holderman (1–0)	Holton (0–3)	Smith (15)	21,239	28–22	W4
51	May 20	@ Tigers	3–2 (10)	Holderman (2–0)	Holton (0–4)	Smith (16)	20,450	29–22	W5
52	May 21	@ Tigers	3–1	Cantillo (4–1)	Mize (2–3)	Gaddis (1)	25,687	30–22	W6
53	May 22	@ Phillies	1–0	Williams (7–3)	Durán (1–2)	Smith (17)	38,092	31–22	W7
54	May 23	@ Phillies	0–3	Wheeler (4–0)	Cecconi (3–5)	Durán (9)	36,125	31–23	L1
55	May 24	@ Phillies	3–1	Messick (6–1)	Painter (1–5)	Smith (18)	37,808	32–23	W1
56	May 25	Nationals	2–10	Littell (4–4)	Bibee (0–7)	—	25,494	32–24	L1
57	May 26	Nationals	3–6	Cavalli (3–3)	Cantillo (4–2)	Parker (1)	21,473	32–25	L2
58	May 27	Nationals	3–2	Williams (8–3)	Mikolas (1–4)	Smith (19)	19,559	33–25	W1
59	May 29	Red Sox	4–3	Holderman (3–0)	Samaniego (0–3)	Smith (20)	34,404	34–25	W2
60	May 30	Red Sox	1–9	Gray (6–1)	Festa (1–1)	—	35,740	34–26	L1
61	May 31	Red Sox	4–9	Morán (1–2)	Holderman (3–1)	—	28,798	34–27	L2

June: 10–15 (Home: 4–6; Road: 6–9)

#	Date	Opponent	Score	Win	Loss	Save	Attendance	Record	Streak
62	June 2	@ Yankees	9–4	Holderman (4–1)	Schlittler (7–3)	—	41,045	35–27	W1
63	June 3	@ Yankees	5–4	Williams (9–3)	Cole (1–1)	Smith (21)	37,683	36–27	W2
64	June 4	@ Yankees	1–2	Headrick (4–1)	Heuer (0–1)	Bednar (13)	39,504	36–28	L1
65	June 5	@ Rangers	2–3	Gray (2–0)	Messick (6–2)	Latz (9)	27,738	36–29	L2
66	June 6	@ Rangers	6–0	Bibee (1–7)	Leiter (3–5)	—	31,608	37–29	W1
67	June 7	@ Rangers	0–10	deGrom (5–4)	Cantillo (4–3)	—	34,851	37–30	L1
68	June 8	Yankees	5–7 (10)	Bednar (2–3)	Armstrong (1–1)	—	29,517	37–31	L2
69	June 9	Yankees	2–3	Doval (2–0)	Herrin (0–2)	Cruz (1)	27,154	37–32	L3
70	June 10	Yankees	4–8	Rodón (2–2)	Messick (6–3)	—	31,586	37–33	L4
71	June 12	Tigers	3–2	Bibee (2–7)	Flaherty (1–8)	Smith (22)	35,427	38–33	W1
72	June 13	Tigers	3–1	Cantillo (5–3)	Skubal (3–3)	Smith (23)	32,683	39–33	W2
―	June 14	Tigers	Postponed (rain) (Makeup date: September 4)						
73	June 16	@ Brewers	1–2	Ashby (10–0)	Gaddis (1–2)	Megill (9)	30,025	39–34	L1
74	June 17	@ Brewers	4–9	Patrick (4–3)	Williams (9–4)	—	30,452	39–35	L2
75	June 18	@ Brewers	4–2	Messick (7–3)	Anderson (1–3)	Smith (24)	36,386	40–35	W1
76	June 19	@ Astros	3–9	Imai (4–3)	Bibee (2–8)	—	33,279	40–36	L1
77	June 20	@ Astros	8–1	Cantillo (6–3)	Arrighetti (7–3)	—	32,678	41–36	W1
78	June 21	@ Astros	1–2	Teng (4–6)	Cecconi (3–6)	Hader (5)	36,807	41–37	L1
79	June 22	@ White Sox	5–6	Murphy (2–0)	Smith (2–1)	—	23,151	41–38	L2
80	June 23	@ White Sox	1–2	Burke (5–6)	Messick (7–4)	Newcomb (2)	28,883	41–39	L3
81	June 24	@ White Sox	4–3 (10)	Armstrong (2–1)	Taylor (2–1)	—	17,664	42–39	W1
82	June 26	Mariners	1–3	Castillo (3–6)	Herrin (0–3)	Muñoz (15)	32,832	42–40	L1
83	June 27	Mariners	4–3	Cecconi (4–6)	Gilbert (6–5)	Smith (25)	33,309	43–40	W1
84	June 28	Mariners	6–5	Festa (2–1)	Rucker (0–1)	Smith (26)	27,934	44–40	W2
85	June 29	Rangers	3–6	Ahlstrom (3–0)	Messick (7–5)	Latz (17)	20,379	44–41	L1
86	June 30	Rangers	2–4	deGrom (7–5)	Bibee (2–9)	Latz (18)	21,674	44–42	L2

July: 12–13 (Home: 6–7; Road: 6–6)

#	Date	Opponent	Score	Win	Loss	Save	Attendance	Record	Streak
87	July 1	Rangers	9–4	Cantillo (7–3)	Gore (5–7)	—	20,141	45–42	W1
88	July 2	White Sox	6–5	Herrin (1–3)	Taylor (4–2)	—	22,556	46–42	W2
89	July 3	White Sox	4–3 (10)	Sabrowski (3–1)	Newcomb (0–2)	—	33,646	47–42	W3
90	July 4	White Sox	1–3	Eisert (2–1)	Herrin (1–4)	Taylor (3)	31,727	47–43	L1
91	July 5	White Sox	6–7	Fedde (4–6)	Holderman (4–2)	Newcomb (3)	22,616	47–44	L2
92	July 7	@ Twins	1–3	Bradley (8–3)	Cantillo (7–4)	Gómez (10)	17,813	47–45	L3
93	July 8	@ Twins	5–6	Gómez (1–0)	Festa (2–2)	—	14,901	47–46	L4
94	July 9	@ Twins	5–2	Williams (10–4)	Rojas (1–1)	Smith (27)	22,221	48–46	W1
95	July 10	@ Marlins	3–2	Messick (8–5)	Alcántara (10–5)	Smith (28)	15,605	49–46	W2
96	July 11	@ Marlins	4–1	Bibee (3–9)	Pérez (5–7)	Holderman (1)	16,070	50–46	W3
97	July 12	@ Marlins	5–2	Cantillo (8–4)	Phillips (2–4)	—	17,147	51–46	W4
96th All-Star Game: Philadelphia, PA
―	July 17	Pirates	Postponed (smoke) (Makeup date: July 18)						
98	July 18 (1)	Pirates	1–7	Jones (2–1)	Williams (10–5)	—	27,989	51–47	L1
99	July 18 (2)	Pirates	5–3	Smith (3–1)	Santana (2–5)	—	32,997	52–47	W1
100	July 19	Pirates	1–7	Skenes (9–8)	Cantillo (8–5)	—	31,973	52–48	L1
101	July 20	Twins	13–4	Bibee (4–9)	Ryan (6–6)	—	22,501	53–48	W1
102	July 21	Twins	5–2	Holderman (5–2)	Paredes (0–3)	Smith (29)	19,714	54–48	W2
103	July 22	Twins	6–10	Adams (2–0)	Cecconi (4–7)	—	22,807	54–49	L1
104	July 23	Twins	1–3 (12)	Rogers (5–3)	Sabrowski (3–2)	Anderson (1)	27,354	54–50	L2
105	July 24	@ Rays	3–11	McClanahan (9–6)	Cantillo (8–6)	Roycroft (1)	19,099	54–51	L3
106	July 25	@ Rays	0–3	Martinez (10–2)	Bibee (4–10)	Baker (27)	24,100	54–52	L4
107	July 26	@ Rays	0–1	Rasmussen (9–5)	Messick (8–6)	Baker (28)	20,562	54–53	L5
―	July 27	@ Reds	Postponed (rain) (Makeup date: July 28)						
108	July 28 (1)	@ Reds	6–5	Holderman (6–2)	Moll (1–7)	Smith (30)	16,866	55–53	W1
109	July 28 (2)	@ Reds	0–2	Franco (1–0)	Williams (10–6)	Pagán (11)	26,928	55–54	L1
110	July 29	@ Reds	6–1	Sabrowski (4–2)	Singer (5–10)	—	17,084	56–54	W1
111	July 31	Diamondbacks	1–4	Loáisiga (3–3)	Bibee (4–11)	Garcia (3)	36,639	56–55	L2

August: 13–13 (Home: 5–9; Road: 8–4)

#	Date	Opponent	Score	Win	Loss	Save	Attendance	Record	Streak
112	August 1	Diamondbacks	8–12	Carrillo (2–0)	Gaddis (1–3)	—	30,392	56–56	L3
113	August 2	Diamondbacks	5–0	Williams (11–6)	Kelly (8–9)	—	24,869	57–56	W1
114	August 4	Mets	2–6	Manaea (3–5)	Cantillo (8–7)	—	24,636	57–57	L1
115	August 5	Mets	5–6 (10)	McDermott (1–0)	Festa (2–3)	Duarte (1)	29,033	57–58	L2
116	August 6	Mets	6–13	McLean (8–7)	Griffin (12–4)	―	26,764	57–59	L3
117	August 7	@ White Sox	8–2	Messick (9–6)	Schultz (3–9)	—	33,750	58–59	W1
118	August 8	@ White Sox	3–6	Kay (9–5)	Holderman (6–3)	Taylor (6)	38,227	58–60	L1
119	August 9	@ White Sox	3–5	Smith (1–0)	Yoho (2–1)	Richards (1)	31,263	58–61	L2
120	August 11	@ Tigers	4–6	Waguespack (1–1)	Bibee (4–12)	Jansen (14)	30,709	58–62	L3
121	August 12	@ Tigers	4–6	Griffin (13–4)	Valdez (7–8)	Smith (31)	31,400	59–62	W1
122	August 13	@ Tigers	0–3	Montero (9–7)	Messick (9–7)	Jansen (15)	31,777	59–63	L1
123	August 14	Padres	5–7	King (8–8)	Williams (11–7)	Rodríguez (1)	35,726	59–64	L2
124	August 15	Padres	6–1	Cantillo (9–7)	Hart (0–3)	—	35,153	60–64	W1
125	August 16	Padres	0–5	Mize (5–7)	Bibee (4–13)	—	24,708	60–65	L1
126	August 18	Giants	8–1	Griffin (14–4)	Whisenhunt (3–4)	—	21,309	61–65	W1
127	August 19	Giants	0–1	Houser (4–7)	Messick (9–8)	Smith (3)	20,021	61–66	L1
128	August 20	Giants	5–2	Williams (12–7)	Roupp (7–13)	Smith (32)	24,448	62–66	W1
129	August 21	@ Rockies	9–1	Herrin (2–4)	Gordon (0–4)	—	26,800	63–66	W2
130	August 22	@ Rockies	4–3	Bibee (5–13)	Hughes (0–5)	Smith (33)	39,327	64–66	W3
131	August 23	@ Rockies	7–2	Griffin (15–4)	Sugano (12–7)	—	28,835	65–66	W4
132	August 24	@ Angels	4–2	Messick (10–8)	Klassen (2–2)	Smith (34)	26,302	66–66	W5
133	August 25	@ Angels	8–6 (10)	Sabrowski (5–2)	Weiman (0–1)	Smith (35)	26,001	67–66	W6
134	August 26	@ Angels	4–3	Gaddis (2–3)	Watson (1–1)	Sabrowski (1)	25,161	68–66	W7
135	August 28	Royals	0–3	Wacha (8–8)	Bibee (5–14)	Cruz (6)	31,941	68–67	L1
136	August 29	Royals	3–8	Gose (1–0)	Holderman (6–4)	—	31,509	68–68	L2
137	August 30	Royals	11–1	Messick (11–8)	Lugo (6–8)	—	28,448	69–68	W1

September: 16–9 (Home: 9–4; Road: 7–5)

#	Date	Opponent	Score	Win	Loss	Save	Attendance	Record	Streak
138	September 1	Blue Jays	6–1	Williams (13–7)	Arrighetti (7–8)	—	18,099	70–68	W2
139	September 2	Blue Jays	0–11	Cease (10–5)	Cantillo (9–8)	—	17,248	70–69	L1
140	September 3	Blue Jays	3–6	Miles (6–2)	Bibee (5–15)	Varland (32)	18,186	70–70	L2
141	September 4 (1)	Tigers	7–6	Smith (4–1)	Sommers (1–4)	—	23,562	71–70	W1
142	September 4 (2)	Tigers	4–3 (10)	Gaddis (3–3)	Jansen (4–6)	—	21,474	72–70	W2
143	September 5	Tigers	0–6	Valdez (9–10)	Messick (11–9)	—	30,862	72–71	L1
144	September 6	Tigers	3–2 (10)	Smith (5–1)	Finnegan (3–1)	—	32,318	73–71	W1
145	September 7	@ Orioles	4–6	Rogers (10–9)	Cantillo (9–9)	Walker (1)	21,612	73–72	L1
146	September 8	@ Orioles	9–5	Herrin (3–4)	Young (9–4)	—	13,279	74–72	W1
147	September 9	@ Orioles	5–9	Baz (6–15)	Griffin (15–5)	Garcia (7)	16,222	74–73	L1
148	September 11	@ Twins	5–2	Gaddis (4–3)	Gómez (2–3)	Smith (36)	20,907	75–73	W1
149	September 12	@ Twins	3–4	Prielipp (5–7)	Aleman (0–1)	Minter (1)	26,158	75–74	L1
150	September 13	@ Twins	9–2	Bibee (6–15)	Ryan (6–10)	—	17,676	76–74	W1
151	September 14	White Sox	3–7	Burke (9–7)	Williams (13–8)	—	24,318	76–75	L1
152	September 15	White Sox	7–6	Smith (6–1)	Taylor (7–3)	—	23,514	77–75	W1
153	September 16	White Sox	6–3	Messick (12–9)	Smith (3–2)	Smith (37)	23,336	78–75	W2
154	September 18	Athletics	5–3	Cantillo (10–9)	Blewett (2–1)	Smith (38)	35,391	79–75	W3
155	September 19	Athletics	12–6	Cecconi (5–7)	Lopez (6–5)	—	31,615	80–75	W4
156	September 20	Athletics	1–0	Williams (14–8)	Perkins (3–12)	Smith (39)	26,110	81–75	W5
157	September 22	@ Red Sox	3–2	Gaddis (5–3)	Miller (4–2)	Smith (40)	37,416	82–75	W6
158	September 23	@ Red Sox	0–1	Gray (18–5)	Griffin (15–6)	Chapman (35)	36,360	82–76	L1
159	September 24	@ Red Sox	1–0	Cantillo (11–9)	Suárez (8–5)	Smith (41)	36,711	83–76	W1
160	September 25	@ Royals	12–9	Gaddis (6–3)	Pearson (2–4)	—	26,034	84–76	W2
161	September 26	@ Royals	11–5	Bibee (7–15)	Wacha (9–10)	—	24,656	85–76	W3
162	September 27	@ Royals	2–3	Pearson (3–4)	Peterson (0–1)	Erceg (13)	22,827	85–77	L1

== Postseason ==
=== Game log ===
2026 Postseason Game Log: 5–6 (Home: 2–4; Away: 3–2)
American League Division Series: 3–2 (Home: 1–2; Away: 2–0)

#	Date	Opponent	Score	Win	Loss	Save	Attendance	Series
1	October 3	White Sox	0–3	Hudson (1–0)	Messick (0–1)	Taylor (1)	34,287	0–1
2	October 5	White Sox	3–4	Burke (1–0)	Sabrowski (0–1)	Taylor (2)	32,050	0–2
3	October 7	@ White Sox	9–3	Griffin (1–0)	Hudson (1–1)	—	40,590	1–2
4	October 8	@ White Sox	9–5	Sabrowski (1–1)	Kay (1–1)	—	39,920	2–2
5	October 10	White Sox	2–0	Williams (1–0)	Burke (1–1)	Smith (1)	36,889	3–2

American League Championship Series: 2–4 (Home: 1–2; Away: 1–2)

#	Date	Opponent	Score	Win	Loss	Save	Attendance	Series
1	October 12	@ Rays	7–3	Gaddis (1–0)	Wells (0–1)	—	35,361	1–0
2	October 13	@ Rays	1–3	Peralta (1–0)	Messick (0–2)	Baker (4)	32,125	1–1
3	October 15	Rays	3–2	Williams (2–0)	Jax (0–1)	Smith (2)	30,101	2–1
―	October 16	Rays	Postponed due to rain. Makeup date October 17.					
4	October 17	Rays	3–7	Martinez (1–0)	Espino (0–1)	—	33,355	2–2
5	October 18	Rays	1–3	Rasmussen (2–0)	Messick (0–3)	Baker (5)	36,303	2–3
6	October 19	@ Rays	3–7	Peralta (2–0)	Armstrong (0–1)	—	40,230	2–4

=== Postseason rosters ===
Playoff rosters
American League Division Series

- Pitchers: 22 Foster Griffin 28 Tanner Bibee 29 Tim Herrin 32 Gavin Williams 33 Hunter Gaddis 36 Cade Smith 41 Daniel Espino 43 Shawn Armstrong 52 Matt Festa 54 Joey Cantillo 62 Erik Sabrowski 77 Parker Messick
- Catchers: 16 Patrick Bailey 27 Austin Hedges
- Infielders: 4 Brayan Rocchio 10 Daniel Schneemann 11 José Ramírez 17 Angel Genao 37 Travis Bazzana 46 Nathaniel Lowe
- Outfielders: 0 Petey Halpin 1 Ángel Martínez 6 David Fry 7 Jo Adell 24 Chase DeLauter 38 Steven Kwan

American League Championship Series

- Pitchers: 22 Foster Griffin 28 Tanner Bibee 29 Tim Herrin 32 Gavin Williams 33 Hunter Gaddis 36 Cade Smith 41 Daniel Espino 43 Shawn Armstrong 44 Slade Cecconi 52 Matt Festa 54 Joey Cantillo 62 Erik Sabrowski 77 Parker Messick
- Catchers: 16 Patrick Bailey 27 Austin Hedges
- Infielders: 4 Brayan Rocchio 6 David Fry 11 José Ramírez 17 Angel Genao 37 Travis Bazzana 46 Nathaniel Lowe
- Outfielders: 0 Petey Halpin 1 Ángel Martínez 7 Jo Adell 24 Chase DeLauter 38 Steven Kwan

== Roster ==
2026 Cleveland Guardians
Roster
Pitchers: 55 Franco Aleman; 49 Kolby Allard; 26 Logan Allen; 43 Shawn Armstrong; 28 Tanner Bibee; 75 Connor Brogdon; 54 Joey Cantillo; 44 Slade Cecconi; 98 Will Dion; 41 Daniel Espino; 52 Matt Festa; 33 Hunter Gaddis; 22 Foster Griffin; 40 Carlos Hernández; 29 Tim Herrin; 50 Codi Heuer; 35 Colin Holderman; 77 Parker Messick; 41 Peyton Pallette; 49 Austin Peterson; 62 Erik Sabrowski; 36 Cade Smith; 32 Gavin Williams; 23 Craig Yoho	Catchers: 16 Patrick Bailey; 27 Austin Hedges; 23 Bo Naylor; Infielders: 13 Gabriel Arias; 37 Travis Bazzana; 34 Juan Brito; 17 Ángel Genao; 8 Rhys Hoskins; 4 Brayan Rocchio; 46 Nathaniel Lowe; 9 Kyle Manzardo; 11 José Ramírez; 4 Brayan Rocchio; 10 Daniel Schneemann	Outfielders: 7 Jo Adell; 24 Chase DeLauter; 17 Stuart Fairchild; 6 David Fry; 0 Petey Halpin; 30 Cooper Ingle; 2 C. J. Kayfus; 38 Steven Kwan; 1 Ángel Martínez; 7 George Valera; 31 Kahlil Watson	Manager: 12 Stephen Vogt; Coaches: 15 Sandy Alomar Jr. (first base/catching); 57 Tony Arnerich (bench coach); 85 Junior Betances (assistant hitting); 56 Grant Fink (hitting); 81 Brad Goldberg (assistant pitching); 88 Caleb Longshore (bullpen); 84 J. T. Maguire (outfield/base running); 87 Andy McKay (field coordinator); 53 Rouglas Odor (third base/infield); 82 Ricky Pacione (bullpen catcher); 83 Dan Puente (assistant hitting); 89 Agustin Rivero (coach/interpreter); 72 Eric Rodríguez (bullpen catcher); 86 Joe Torres (assistant pitching); -- Josh Tubbs (hitting analyst); 51 Carl Willis (pitching)

== Player stats ==
Note: Team leaders in each category are in bold.

- Indicates league leader.

=== Batting ===
Note: G = Games played; AB = At bats; R = Runs scored; H = Hits; 2B = Doubles; 3B = Triples; HR = Home runs; RBI = Runs batted in; SB = Stolen bases; BB = Walks; AVG = Batting average; SLG = Slugging average

Player	G	AB	R	H	2B	3B	HR	RBI	SB	BB	AVG	SLG
Steven Kwan	151	**539**	**80**	**152**	21	**3**	3	32	10	**85**	.282	.349
Brayan Rocchio	**153**	534	66	135	25	2	15	**73**	20	38	.253	.391
Chase DeLauter	133	495	62	142	**30**	**3**	16	67	11	60	**.287**	**.457**
José Ramírez	125	473	71	111	27	0	12	53	**37**	60	.235	.368
Travis Bazzana	124	449	56	110	22	**3**	15	57	19	56	.245	.408
Ángel Martínez	114	389	49	99	24	2	**18**	62	11	13	.254	.465
Kyle Manzardo	102	312	40	67	10	1	13	39	0	36	.215	.378
Rhys Hoskins	95	263	33	47	13	0	13	38	1	47	.179	.376
Daniel Schneemann	91	262	30	55	11	0	7	30	7	24	.210	.332
Patrick Bailey	82	228	26	52	8	1	9	32	1	21	.228	.390
Austin Hedges	78	215	25	53	10	0	6	25	1	25	.247	.377
David Fry	91	184	23	37	6	0	8	20	0	28	.201	.364
Jo Adell	48	180	24	44	10	0	7	32	2	18	.244	.417
Petey Halpin	83	178	27	40	4	1	4	14	10	9	.225	.326
Nathaniel Lowe	43	133	12	30	5	0	5	27	0	10	.226	.376
Gabriel Arias	42	127	15	27	4	0	2	6	1	11	.213	.291
Ángel Genao	40	127	15	27	4	0	2	6	1	11	.213	.291
Kahlil Watson	27	88	6	21	6	0	1	11	9	3	.239	.341
Bo Naylor	28	84	4	12	2	0	2	7	0	6	.143	.238
Juan Brito	15	51	7	9	4	0	0	3	0	4	.176	.255
George Valera	13	37	1	8	3	0	0	6	0	1	.216	.297
CJ Kayfus	9	22	4	4	1	0	1	2	0	2	.182	.364
Cooper Ingle	7	21	1	2	0	0	0	2	0	3	.095	.095
Stuart Fairchild	14	19	3	3	0	0	0	1	2	7	.158	.158
**Totals**	**162**	**5410**	**678**	**1291**	**249**	**16**	**162**	**650**	**146**	**574**	**.239**	**.380**

=== Pitching ===
Note: W = Wins; L = Losses; ERA = Earned run average; G = Games pitched; GS = Games started; SV = Saves; IP = Innings pitched; H = Hits allowed; R = Runs allowed; ER = Earned runs allowed; BB = Walks allowed; SO = Strikeouts

Player	W	L	ERA	G	GS	SV	IP	H	R	ER	BB	SO
Tanner Bibee	7	**15**	4.36	33	**33**	0	**188.0**	**175**	**95**	**91**	55	148
Parker Messick	12	9	**2.56**	32	32	0	186.1	149	57	53	49	193
Gavin Williams	**14**	8	3.76	32	32	0	184.1	144	81	77	61	**248***
Joey Cantillo	11	9	3.62	33	30	0	159.0	144	79	64	**81***	171
Slade Cecconi	5	7	4.91	28	21	0	121.0	134	72	66	39	99
Cade Smith	6	1	1.95	**69**	0	**41**	74.0	48	20	16	23	107
Matt Festa	2	3	3.78	66	0	1	66.2	66	32	28	21	69
Hunter Gaddis	6	3	2.98	68	0	1	60.1	55	20	20	22	57
Tim Herrin	3	4	3.02	67	0	0	56.2	46	22	19	28	54
Colin Holderman	6	4	2.73	54	0	1	52.2	35	18	16	20	50
Erik Sabrowski	5	2	2.61	60	0	1	48.1	26	17	14	31	76
Foster Griffin	3	3	5.19	9	9	0	43.1	55	27	25	15	42
Shawn Armstrong	2	1	4.58	41	0	0	35.1	29	19	18	19	34
Franco Alemán	0	1	4.43	21	0	0	22.1	25	12	11	10	28
Peyton Pallette	1	2	5.23	16	0	0	20.2	17	13	12	16	22
Will Dion	0	0	4.58	12	0	0	19.2	24	14	10	3	25
Craig Yoho	0	1	6.87	19	0	0	18.1	20	14	14	10	23
Logan Allen	0	0	5.94	7	2	0	16.2	23	14	11	6	16
Connor Brogdon	2	2	5.06	16	0	1	16.0	15	12	9	3	15
Daniel Espino	0	0	4.11	14	3	0	15.1	12	7	7	7	25
Codi Heuer	0	1	4.66	8	0	0	9.2	12	5	5	5	6
Kolby Allard	0	0	10.38	4	0	0	8.2	16	10	10	3	9
Austin Peterson	0	1	2.57	2	0	0	7.0	4	2	2	2	8
Austin Hedges	0	0	6.23	4	0	0	4.1	7	3	3	0	1
Carlos Hernández	0	0	6.00	2	0	0	3.0	5	2	2	1	4
**Totals**	**85**	**77**	**3.77**	**162**	**162**	**46**	**1437.2**	**1286**	**667**	**602**	**530**	**1530**

== Farm system ==
Level	Team	League	Manager
AAA	Columbus Clippers	International League	Andy Tracy
AA	Akron RubberDucks	Eastern League	Greg DiCenzo
High-A	Lake County Captains	Midwest League	Omir Santos
Low–A	Hill City Howlers	Carolina League	Erlin Cerda
Rookie	ACL Guardians	Arizona Complex League	Juan De La Cruz
Rookie	DSL Guardians Goryl	Dominican Summer League	Mac Seibert
Rookie	DSL Guardians Mendoza	Dominican Summer League	Jonathan López
