= Rockingham County Baseball League =

- Sport: Baseball
- Founded: 1924
- No. of teams: 8
- Country: United States
- Most recent champion: Clover Hill
- Official website: www.rcblbaseball.com

The Rockingham County Baseball League is a summer baseball league in Rockingham County, Virginia and neighboring areas. It was founded in 1924 and is one of the oldest continuous baseball leagues in the country. The league has included teams from across Rockingham County and up and down the Shenandoah Valley. As of 2024, the RCBL has 8 teams and has a 24-game regular season schedule where every team plays each other 3 to 4 times. The quarterfinal round of the playoffs is best out of three games, the semifinal round is best out of five games, and the championship round is best out of seven games.

== Teams ==
- Grottoes Cardinals - Shifflett Field
- Massanutten Mountaineers – Monger Park
- Stuarts Draft Diamondbacks – The Diamond Club
- Bridgewater Reds – Ray Heatwole Field
- Broadway Bruins – Broadway High School
- Clover Hill Bucks – Buck Bowman Park
- Montezuma Braves – Ruritan Park
- Elkton Blue Sox - Stonewall Memorial Park

== Championships ==
- Clover Hill – 20
- Bridgewater – 17
- Linville – 11
- Grottoes – 9
- Stuarts Draft - 4
- Mt. Crawford – 4
- Dayton – 3
- Broadway – 3
- Shockers - 2
- Harriston – 2
- Elkton – 2
- Keezletown – 2
- Ottobine – 2
- Spring Creek – 2
- Harrisonburg – 1
- Twin County – 1
- Waynesboro – 1
- Weyers Cave - 1
- Fishersville – 1
- Briery Branch- 1
- Montezuma – 1

== Former teams ==
- Linville Patriots
- Fishersville Rangers
- Fishersville Cardinals
- Briery Branch Braves
- Twin County Twins
- Harrisonburg Chic's
- Luray Cavemen
- Luray Colonials
- Shenandoah Indians
- Spring Creek
- Ottobine
- New Market Shockers

== Famous alumni ==
- Dell Curry
- Travis Harper
- Maven Huffman
- Alan Knicely
- Larry Sheets
- Wayne Comer
- Brian Bocock
- Lorenzo Bundy
- Tom Brookens
- Daryl Irvine
- Reggie Harris
- Erik Kratz
- Brenton Doyle
- Chase DeLauter
- Brenan Hanifee
- Will Wagner (baseball)

== RCBL Champions ==
Year	RCBL Champion
1924	Broadway
1925	Weyers Cave
1926	Spring Creek
1927	Bridgewater
1928	Spring Creek
1929	Dayton
1930	Dayton
1931	Waynesboro
1932	Harrisonburg
1933	No League
1934	No League
1935	No League
1936	No League
1937	No League
1938	Broadway
1939	Elkton
1940	Linvile
1941	Keezletown
1942	World War II
1943	World War II
1944	World War II
1945	World War II
1946	Mt. Crawford
1947	Mt. Crawford
1948	Mt. Crawford
1949	Mt. Crawford
1950	Ottobine
1951	Ottobine
1952	Bridgewater
1953	Grottoes
1954	Dayton
1955	Clover Hill
1956	Grottoes
1957	Grottoes
1958	Grottoes
1959	Linville
1960	Linville
1961	Linville
1962	Bridgewater
1963	Clover Hill
1964	Keezletown
1965	Harriston
1966	Grottoes
1967	Harriston
1968	Briery Branch
1969	Grottoes
1970	Harriston
1971	Grottoes
1972	Twin County
1973	Linville
1974	Linville
1975	Clover Hill
1976	Clover Hill
1977	Bridgewater
1978	Bridgewater
1979	Linville
1980	Linville
1981	Linville
1982	Clover Hill
1983	Grottoes
1984	Bridgewater
1985	Clover Hill
1986	Linville
1987	Clover Hill
1988	Bridgewater
1989	Bridgewater
1990	Bridgewater
1991	Bridgewater
1992	Bridgewater
1993	Bridgewater
1994	Bridgewater
1995	Bridgewater
1996	Grottoes
1997	Clover Hill
1998	Briery Branch
1999	Bridgewater
2000	Linville
2001	Fishersville
2002	Elkton
2003	Clover Hill
2004	Clover Hill
2005	Clover Hill
2006	Montezuma
2007	Clover Hill
2008	Clover Hill
2009	Clover Hill
2010	Clover Hill
2011	Clover Hill
2012	Stuarts Draft
2013	Stuarts Draft
2014	Stuarts Draft
2015	Clover Hill
2016	Stuarts Draft
2017	Bridgewater
2018	Bridgewater
2019	Clover Hill
2020	Broadway
2021	New Market Shockers
2022	Bridgewater
2023	RCBL Shockers
2024	Clover Hill
2025	Clover Hill
