= Gavin Williams (baseball) =

American baseball player (born 1999)

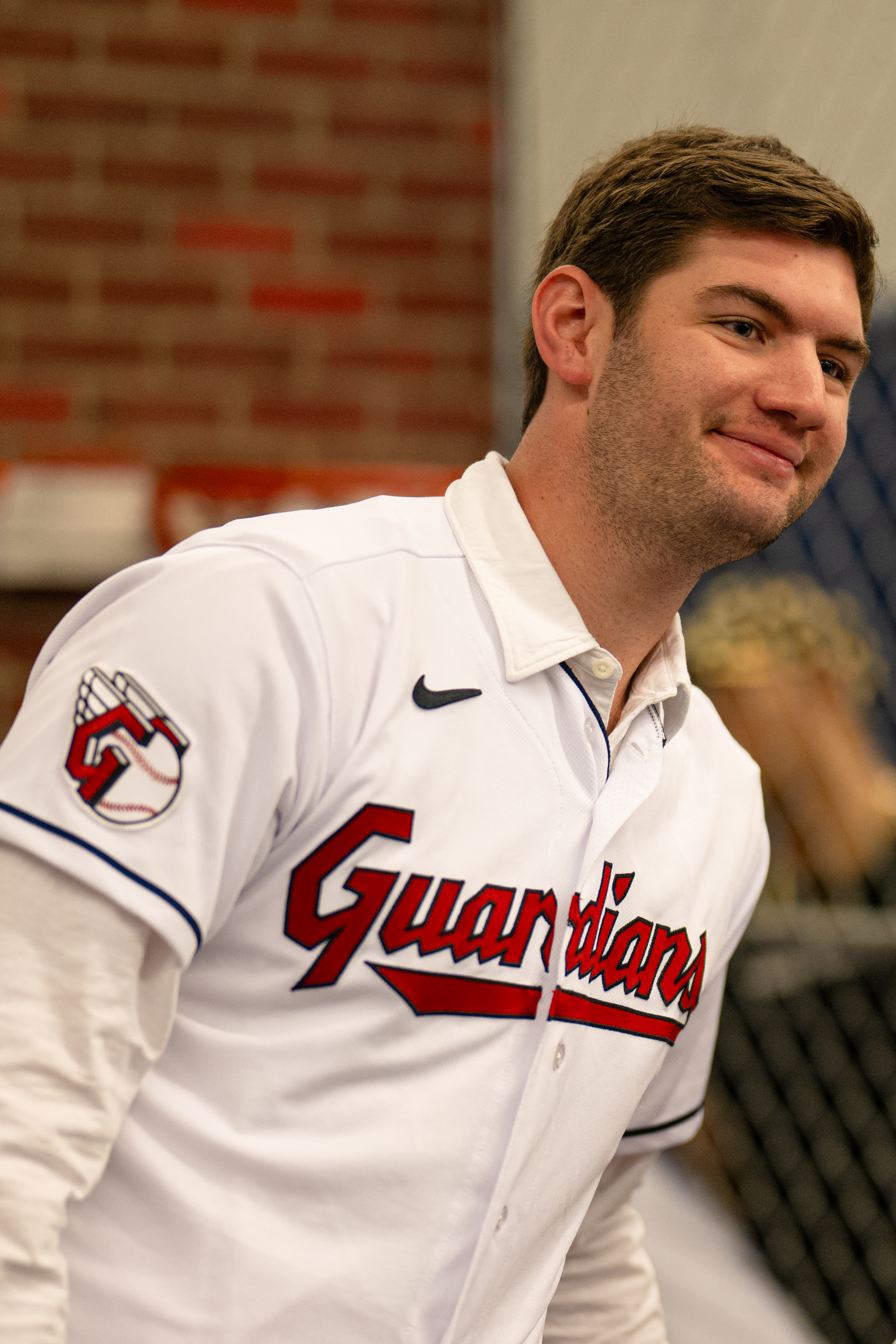
- Williams with the Cleveland Guardians in 2024

Cleveland Guardians – No. 32
- Pitcher
- Born: July 26, 1999 (age 27); Fayetteville, North Carolina, U.S.
- Bats: Left Throws: Right

MLB debut
- June 21, 2023, for the Cleveland Guardians

MLB statistics (through 2026 season)
- Win–loss record: 32–28
- Earned run average: 3.62
- Strikeouts: 581
- Stats at Baseball Reference

Teams
- Cleveland Guardians (2023–present)

Career highlights and awards
- AL strikeout leader (2026); Pitched an immaculate inning on July 23, 2026

Gavin Scott Williams (born July 26, 1999), nicknamed "the Big Rig", is an American professional baseball pitcher for the Cleveland Guardians of Major League Baseball (MLB). He was selected by Cleveland in the first round of the 2021 Major League Baseball draft and made his MLB debut in 2023. In 2026, he led the American League in strikeouts.

== Amateur career ==
Williams attended Cape Fear High School in Fayetteville, North Carolina. As a senior in 2017, he threw two consecutive no-hitters after returning to play after undergoing surgery on a torn meniscus. He ended his senior year with a 6–1 win–loss record and a 0.35 earned run average (ERA) over 39 innings pitched. He was selected by the Tampa Bay Rays in the 30th round of the 2017 Major League Baseball draft, but did not sign, instead enrolling at East Carolina University.

In 2018, as a freshman for the East Carolina Pirates, Williams missed time due to a forearm strain but still compiled a 1.15 ERA over 15 2/3 innings. After the 2018 season, he played collegiate summer baseball with the Bourne Braves of the Cape Cod Baseball League. As a sophomore in 2019, he appeared in 21 games (five starts), going 1–4 with a 4.56 ERA over 49 1/3 innings. In 2020, he pitched three innings before the college baseball season was cancelled due to the COVID-19 pandemic. He was considered a top prospect for the 2020 Major League Baseball draft, but went unselected. Williams moved into the starting rotation for the 2021 season. He missed the beginning of the year with a minor injury but still appeared in 15 games (making 12 starts), going 10–1 with a 1.88 ERA with 130 strikeouts over 81 1/3 innings. He was named the American Athletic Conference Pitcher of the Year alongside earning 2021 College Baseball All-America Team honors.

== Professional career ==
=== Minor leagues ===
The Cleveland Indians selected Williams in the first round, with the 23rd overall selection, of the 2021 Major League Baseball draft. He signed for a $2.25 million signing bonus.

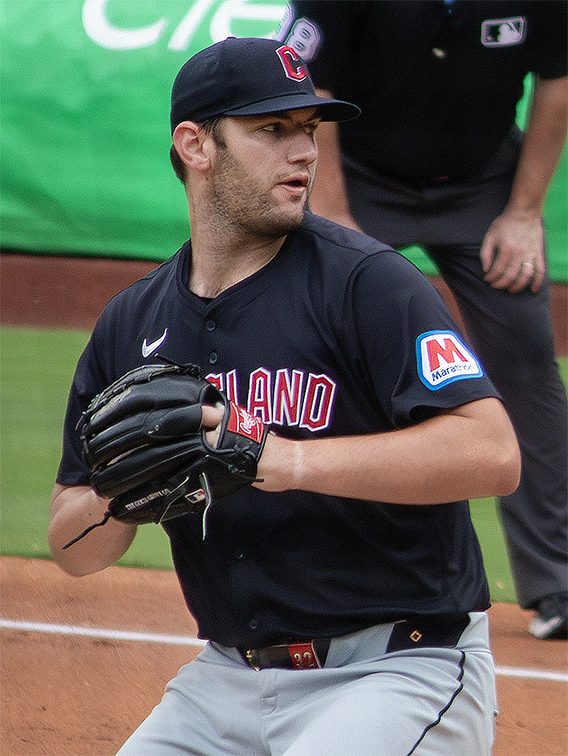
Gavin Williams with Cleveland in 2024

Williams was assigned to the Lake County Captains of the High-A Midwest League to make his professional debut and begin the 2022 season. After nine starts in which he went 2–1 with a 1.40 ERA and 67 strikeouts over 45 innings, he was promoted to the Akron RubberDucks of the Double-A Eastern League. Over 16 starts with Akron, he posted a 3–3 record with a 2.31 ERA and 82 strikeouts over seventy innings. He returned to Akron to open the 2023 season. After three starts, he was promoted to the Columbus Clippers of the Triple-A International League. Williams logged a 3–2 record and 2.93 ERA with 61 strikeouts across nine starts for Columbus.

=== Major leagues ===
On June 20, 2023, the Guardians announced that Williams would be promoted to the major leagues for the first time to start the following day against the Oakland Athletics. He made his MLB debut June 21, allowing four runs on four hits and three walks along with four strikeouts across 5 2/3 innings in a 7-6 Guardians victory. He spent the remainder of the season with the Guardians. Across 16 starts during his rookie campaign, Williams recorded a 3–5 record and 3.29 ERA with 81 strikeouts across 82 innings pitched.

Williams began the 2024 season on Cleveland's injured list with right elbow inflammation. He was transferred to the 60–day injured list on May 9, 2024. He was activated from the injured list on June 30. Upon his return, Williams made 16 starts for the Guardians and went 3–10 with a 4.86 ERA and 79 strikeouts across 76 innings. He made his postseason debut as Cleveland's starting pitcher in Game 4 of the 2024 American League Championship Series against the New York Yankees and gave up three run across 2 1/3 innings in an 8-6 Yankees win.

Williams returned to Cleveland's starting rotation for the 2025 season. On July 1, 2025, he recorded an unusual inning against the Chicago Cubs at Wrigley Field, retiring three baserunners via “non-plate appearance outs” in one inning; one at home plate and two on pickoffs at first base—marking the first such occurrence for Cleveland since at least 1920, and the first in MLB since April 13, 1985. On August 6, 2025, Williams came two outs short of throwing a no-hitter against the New York Mets. After Williams struck out former Cleveland player Francisco Lindor to open the ninth inning, Juan Soto hit a home run to end the no-hit bid. Williams was removed after inducing a fly ball and a walk. This would have been the first Cleveland no-hitter since Len Barker's perfect game against the Toronto Blue Jays in 1981, and would have given the Blue Jays the longest no-hit drought.

Williams ended the 2025 regular season having started 31 games for Cleveland and pitched to a 12–5 record, a 3.06 ERA, and 173 strikeouts over 167 2/3 innings. He was named Cleveland's starting pitcher in Game 1 of the 2025 American League Wild Card Series versus the Detroit Tigers. He gave up two unearned runs and struck out eight batters over six innings and was the game's losing pitcher as Detroit won 2-1.

On July 23, 2026, Williams pitched an immaculate inning against the Minnesota Twins by striking out Byron Buxton, Ryan Jeffers, and Josh Bell in the bottom of the fourth inning. It was the first immaculate inning by a Cleveland pitcher since Enyel De Los Santos accomplished the feat against the Tampa Bay Rays on September 27, 2022. On September 1, Williams recorded a career–high 13 strikeouts against the Toronto Blue Jays. Williams made 32 starts for Cleveland and ended the season with a 14–8 record, a 3.76 ERA, and 248 strikeouts across 184 1/3 innings. His 248 strikeouts led the American League. Williams made his first appearance in the 2026 postseason as Cleveland's starting pitcher in Game 2 the 2026 American League Division Series against the Chicago White Sox, and gave up two earned runs on four hits, three walks and 11 strikeouts as the White Sox won 4-3. In Game 4, he finished the game with a scoreless 9th inning out of the bullpen, the first relief appearance of his career. Williams was the starter of Game 5 two days later, where he pitched a no-hitter through 5 2/3 innings and struck out twelve batters, which tied Charles Nagy's single game total from 1996. After allowing a hit and a walk, he was taken out for Erik Sabrowski, who stranded the runners. The Guardians won the game 2-0, advancing to the 2026 American League Championship Series.
