= Slade Cecconi =

American baseball player (born 1999)

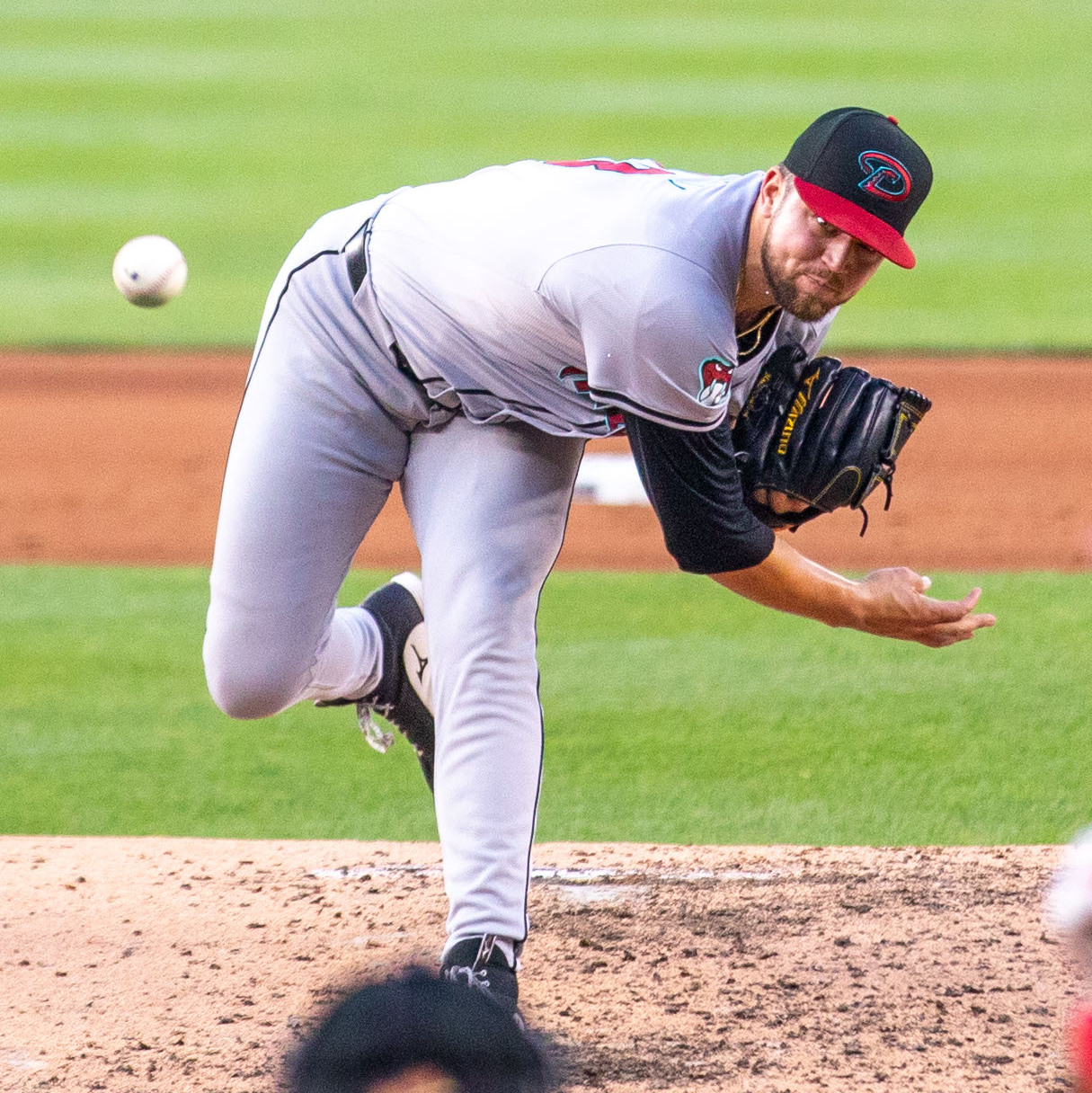
- Cecconi with the Arizona Diamondbacks in 2024

Cleveland Guardians – No. 44
- Pitcher
- Born: June 24, 1999 (age 27); Oviedo, Florida, U.S.
- Bats: Right Throws: Right

MLB debut
- August 2, 2023, for the Arizona Diamondbacks

MLB statistics (through 2026 season)
- Win–loss record: 14–22
- Earned run average: 5.02
- Strikeouts: 292
- Stats at Baseball Reference

Teams
- Arizona Diamondbacks (2023–2024); Cleveland Guardians (2025–present)

Slade Gustave Cecconi (/sɛˈkoʊni/ seh-KOH-nee; born June 24, 1999) is an American professional baseball pitcher for the Cleveland Guardians of Major League Baseball (MLB). He has previously played in MLB for the Arizona Diamondbacks. He made his MLB debut in 2023.

== Amateur career ==
Cecconi attended Trinity Preparatory School in Winter Park, Florida, where he played baseball. As a junior in 2017, he went 6–1 with a 0.70 ERA and seventy strikeouts over forty innings. That summer, he was selected to play in the Under Armour All-America Baseball Game at Wrigley Field. In 2018, his senior year, he batted .388 with six home runs. He was selected by the Baltimore Orioles in the 38th round of the 2018 Major League Baseball draft, but did not sign, instead enrolling at the University of Miami where he played college baseball.

In 2019, Cecconi's freshman year with the Miami Hurricanes, he appeared in 17 games (13 starts) in which he went 5–4 with a 4.16 ERA, striking out 89 batters over eighty innings. He was selected to play in the Cape Cod Baseball League for the Wareham Gatemen but did not participate. As a sophomore in 2020, he started four games and posted a 2–1 record with a 3.80 ERA over 21 1/3 innings before the season was cut short due to the COVID-19 pandemic.

== Professional career ==
=== Arizona Diamondbacks ===
The Arizona Diamondbacks selected Cecconi with the 33rd overall pick in the 2020 Major League Baseball draft. On July 10, 2020, Cecconi signed with the Diamondbacks for a $2.4 million bonus. He did not play in a game in 2020 as the minor league season was canceled due to the COVID-19 pandemic.

To begin the 2021 season, Cecconi was assigned to the Hillsboro Hops of the High-A West. He was on the injured list with a wrist injury to begin the year, but began play in mid-May. On August 1, he was placed back on the injured list with an elbow injury, and, on August 5, was transferred to the 60-day injured list, effectively ending his season. Over 12 starts for the year, Cecconi went 4–2 with a 4.12 ERA, striking out 63 and walking twenty over 59 innings. He was selected to play in the Arizona Fall League for the Salt River Rafters after the season. He was assigned to the Amarillo Sod Poodles of the Double-A Texas League for the 2022 season. Over 25 starts, Cecconi posted a 7–6 record with a 4.37 ERA and 127 strikeouts over 129 3/3 innings.

To open the 2023 season, Cecconi was assigned to the Reno Aces of the Triple-A Pacific Coast League. In 20 starts for Reno, he pitched to a 4–8 record and 6.38 ERA with 104 strikeouts in 103 innings of work. On August 2, 2023, the Diamondbacks selected Cecconi to the 40-man roster and promoted him to the major leagues for the first time. In seven games (four starts) in his rookie campaign, he recorded a 4.33 ERA with 20 strikeouts across 27 innings.

Cecconi was optioned to Reno to begin the 2024 season. He posted a 3.06 ERA over 47 innings with Reno. He also made 20 appearances (13 starts) for the Diamondbacks, pitching to a 2–7 record and 6.66 ERA with 64 strikeouts across 77 innings pitched.

=== Cleveland Guardians ===
On December 21, 2024, the Diamondbacks traded Cecconi and a competitive balance draft pick in the 2025 MLB draft to the Cleveland Guardians in exchange for Josh Naylor.

Cecconi missed the beginning of the 2025 season due to a left oblique strain. He completed a rehab assignment with the Triple-A Columbus Clippers and was added to Cleveland's active roster on May 17. He made his Guardians debut that night and allowed three runs on five hits while recording eight strikeouts across five innings in a 4-1 loss to the Cincinnati Reds. For the 2025 season, Cecconi started 23 games and went 7–7 with a 4.30 ERA and 109 strikeouts over 132 innings.

Cecconi was named Cleveland's Opening Day roster as a member of the starting rotation to start the 2026 season. After the Guardians acquired Foster Griffin at the trade deadline, he was moved to the bullpen. On August 7, Cecconi was placed on the injured list with right forearm inflammation. Following a rehab assignment with Columbus, he was activated by the Guardians on September 4. Cecconi pitched in 28 games (21 starts) for the Guardians and ended the season with a 5–7 record, a 4.91 ERA, and 99 strikeouts over 121 innings pitched.
