= Kahlil Watson =

American baseball player (born 2003)

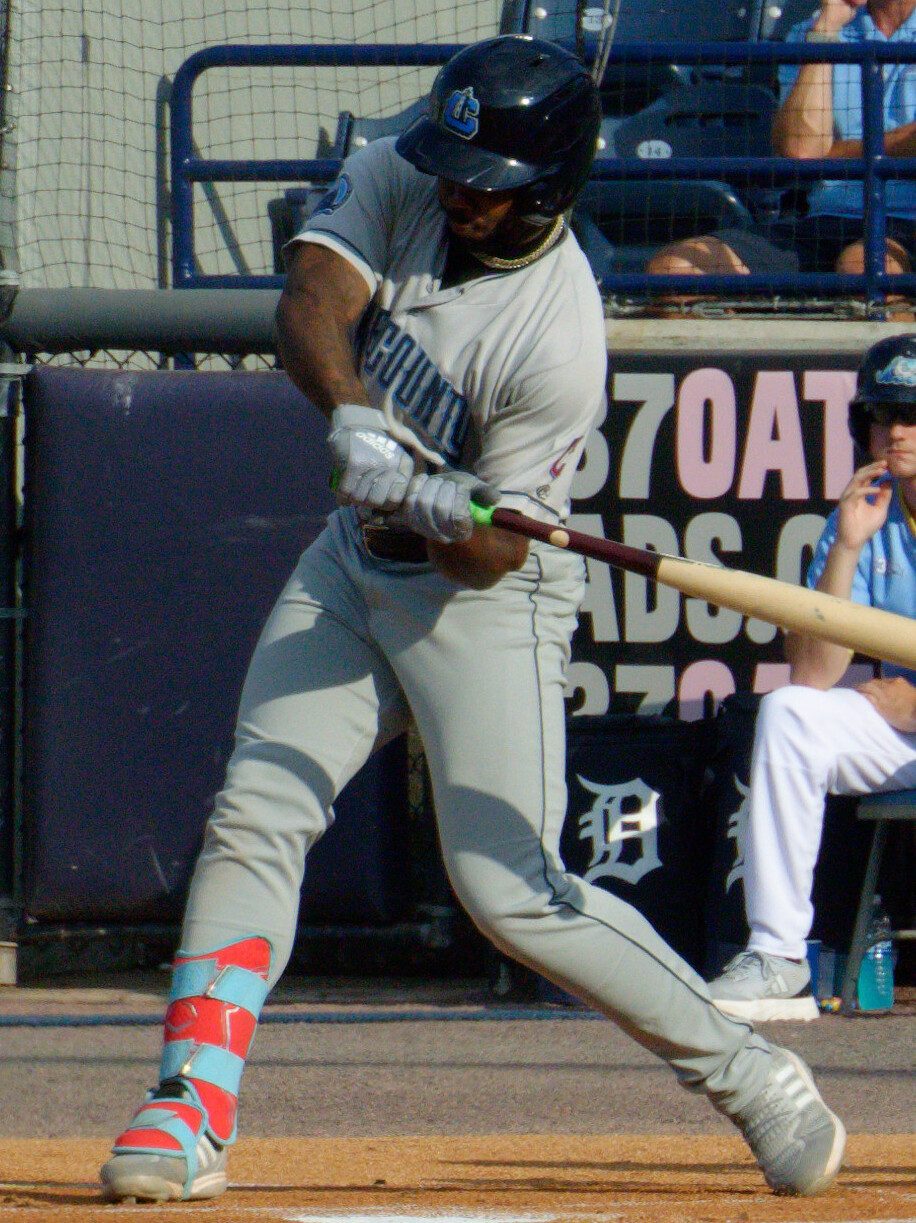
- Watson with the Lake County Captains in 2023

Cleveland Guardians – No. 31
- Outfielder
- Born: April 16, 2003 (age 23); Chase City, Virginia, U.S.
- Bats: Left Throws: Right

MLB debut
- June 18, 2026, for the Cleveland Guardians

MLB statistics (through 2026 season)
- Batting average: .239
- Home runs: 1
- Runs batted in: 11
- Stats at Baseball Reference

Teams
- Cleveland Guardians (2026–present)

Kahlil Lorenzo Watson (born April 16, 2003) is an American professional baseball outfielder for the Cleveland Guardians of Major League Baseball (MLB). He was selected by the Miami Marlins in the first round of the 2021 MLB draft. He was traded to the Guardians in 2023 and made his MLB debut in 2026.

== Amateur career ==
Watson attended Wake Forest High School in Wake Forest, North Carolina. He played both baseball and football. As a freshman, Watson hit .389 with two home runs, 22 runs batted in (RBIs) and 17 stolen bases. As a sophomore he hit .578 with six home runs, 23 RBI and 26 stolen bases. In 2021, as a senior, he hit .513 with six home runs. He committed to North Carolina State University to play college baseball.

== Professional career ==
=== Miami Marlins ===
Watson was selected 16th overall by the Miami Marlins in the 2021 Major League Baseball draft. He signed for $4.5 million.

Watson made his professional debut with the Rookie-level Florida Complex League Marlins, slashing .394/.524/.606 with three doubles, two triples, five RBI and four stolen bases over nine games. He opened the 2022 season with the Jupiter Hammerheads of the Single-A Florida State League. During a game on July 1, Watson struck out on a check swing and subsequently pointed his bat at the first base umpire as if it were a gun and made a shooting gesture. He was suspended from the team although he was not placed on the temporarily inactive list. On July 22, he was demoted to the Rookie-level Florida Complex League Marlins where he played his first game since July 1. He was reassigned back to Jupiter on July 29. Watson played a total of 88 games between both teams, and batted .233 with ten home runs and 47 RBI. He began the 2023 season with the High-A Beloit Snappers and hit .206 with seven home runs and 22 RBI across 58 games.

=== Cleveland Guardians ===
On August 1, 2023, Watson and Jean Segura were traded to the Cleveland Guardians in exchange for first baseman Josh Bell. He made 23 appearances for the High-A Lake County Captains, batting .233/.306/.442 with five home runs, 16 RBI, and 11 stolen bases.

Watson made 96 appearances for the Double-A Akron RubberDucks during the 2024 season, slashing .220/.305/.407 with 16 home runs, 41 RBI, and 15 stolen bases.

In 2025, Watson made 102 appearances split between Double-A Akron and the Triple-A Columbus Clippers, batting a cumulative .250/.346/.467 with 16 home runs, 61 RBI, and 17 stolen bases. On November 18, 2025, the Guardians added Watson to their 40-man roster to protect him from the Rule 5 draft.

Watson was optioned to Triple-A Columbus to begin the 2026 season. In his first 56 appearances for the Clippers, he batted .255/.370/.491 with 12 home runs, 35 RBI, and 15 stolen bases. On June 17, 2026, Watson was promoted to the major leagues for the first time following an injury to Chase DeLauter. He made his MLB debut the next day as Cleveland's starting right fielder and went hitless across four at-bats. On June 23, Watson hit his first career home run off of Sean Burke of the Chicago White Sox.
