= Daniel Espino =

Panamanian baseball player (born 2001)

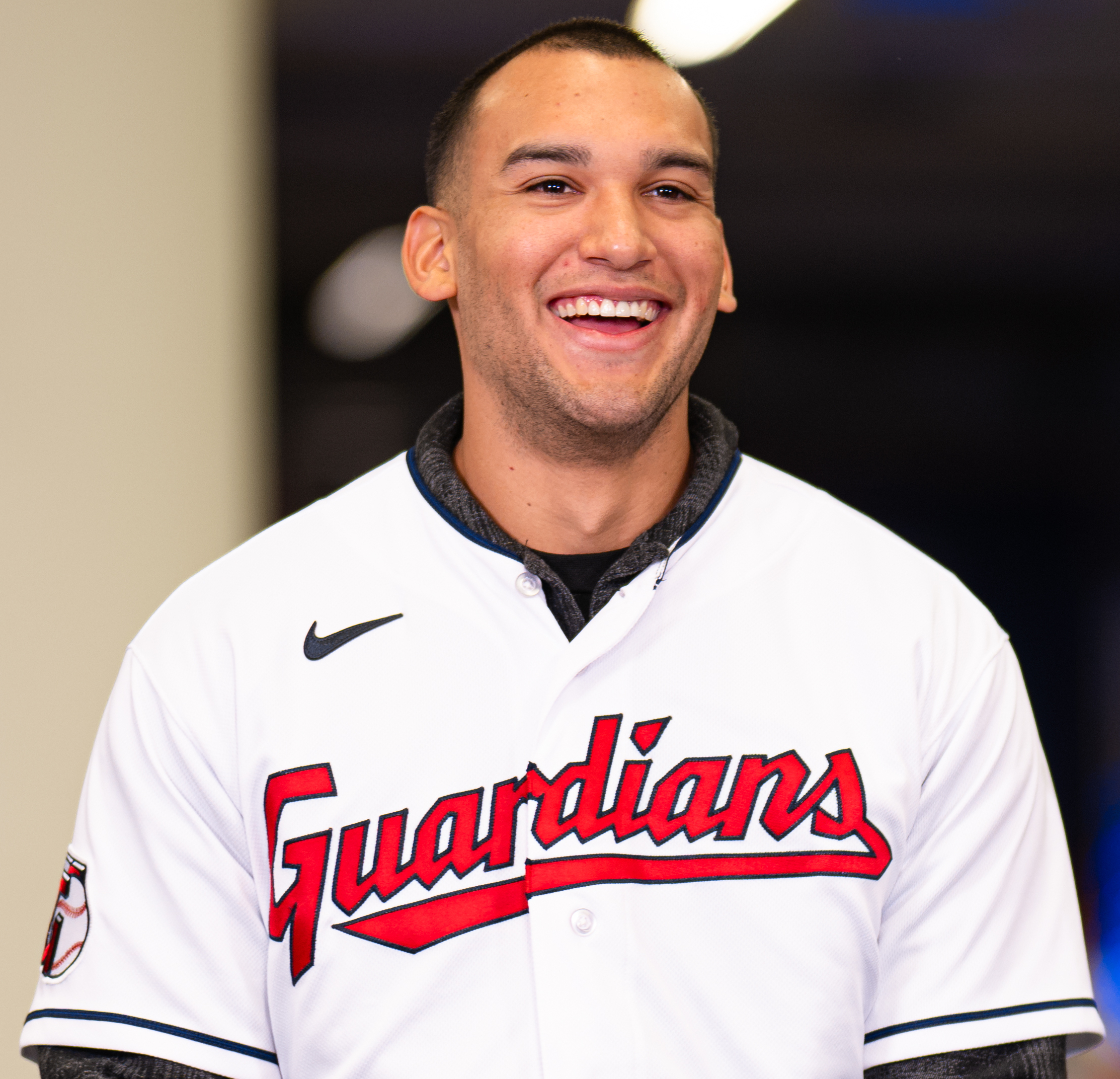
- Espino with the Cleveland Guardians in 2024

Cleveland Guardians – No. 41
- Pitcher
- Born: January 5, 2001 (age 25); Panama City, Panama
- Bats: Right Throws: Right

MLB debut
- June 17, 2026, for the Cleveland Guardians

MLB statistics (through 2026 season)
- Win–loss record: 0–0
- Earned run average: 4.11
- Strikeouts: 25
- Stats at Baseball Reference

Teams
- Cleveland Guardians (2026–present)

Daniel Andres Espino (born January 5, 2001) is a Panamanian professional baseball pitcher for the Cleveland Guardians of Major League Baseball (MLB).

== Amateur career ==
Espino was born and raised in Panama. He came to the United States during the summer of 2016 with the Albany Paulies Baseball Program in Albany, Georgia which helped him to find an opportunity to move to the United States as a sophomore in high school. He began attending Georgia Premier Academy in Statesboro, Georgia. As a senior in 2019, he went 9-0 with a 0.32 ERA. He committed to play college baseball at Louisiana State University.

== Professional career ==
The Cleveland Indians selected Espino in the first round, with the 24th overall selection, of the 2019 Major League Baseball draft. He signed for $2.5 million and made his professional debut with the Arizona League Indians. After pitching to a 1.98 ERA over six starts, he was promoted to the Mahoning Valley Scrappers. Over nine starts between both teams, Espino went 0-3 with a 3.80 ERA, striking out 34 over 23 2/3 innings. Espino did not play a minor league game in 2020 due to the cancellation of the season.

Espino split the 2021 season between the Lynchburg Hillcats and the Lake County Captains, starting twenty games and going 3-8 with a 3.73 ERA and 152 strikeouts over 91 2/3 innings. He was assigned to the Double-A Akron RubberDucks to begin the 2022 season. He made 4 starts for the team, recording a 1-0 record and 2.45 ERA with 35 strikeouts in 18.1 innings pitched. He was placed on the injured list in May with patellar tendinitis, and did not make another appearance in 2022. In December, it was announced that Espino had missed the remainder of the year due to a sore right shoulder.

On February 20, 2023, Espino was shut down from throwing for eight weeks after suffering a right shoulder strain and additional muscle tear in the same shoulder. On May 3, it was announced that Espino would miss 12-to-14 months after undergoing a right shoulder anterior capsule repair surgery.

The Guardians selected Espino's contract on November 14, 2023, adding him to their 40-man roster in order to protect him from the Rule 5 draft. On March 14, 2024, it was announced that Espino had undergone another surgery to repair new shoulder capsule damage and his rotator cuff. The procedure was expected to prevent him from pitching during the 2024 season.

Espino was optioned to the Triple-A Columbus Clippers to begin the 2025 season. However, he made only one start for Columbus, taking the loss after allowing three runs on three hits across 2/3 of an inning.

Espino was optioned to Triple-A Columbus to begin the 2026 season. He made 22 appearances (including one start) for the Clippers, compiling a 1-1 record and 5.30 ERA with 29 strikeouts across 18 2/3 innings pitched. On June 12, 2026, Espino was promoted to the major leagues for the first time.
