= Cooper Criswell =

American baseball player (born 1996)

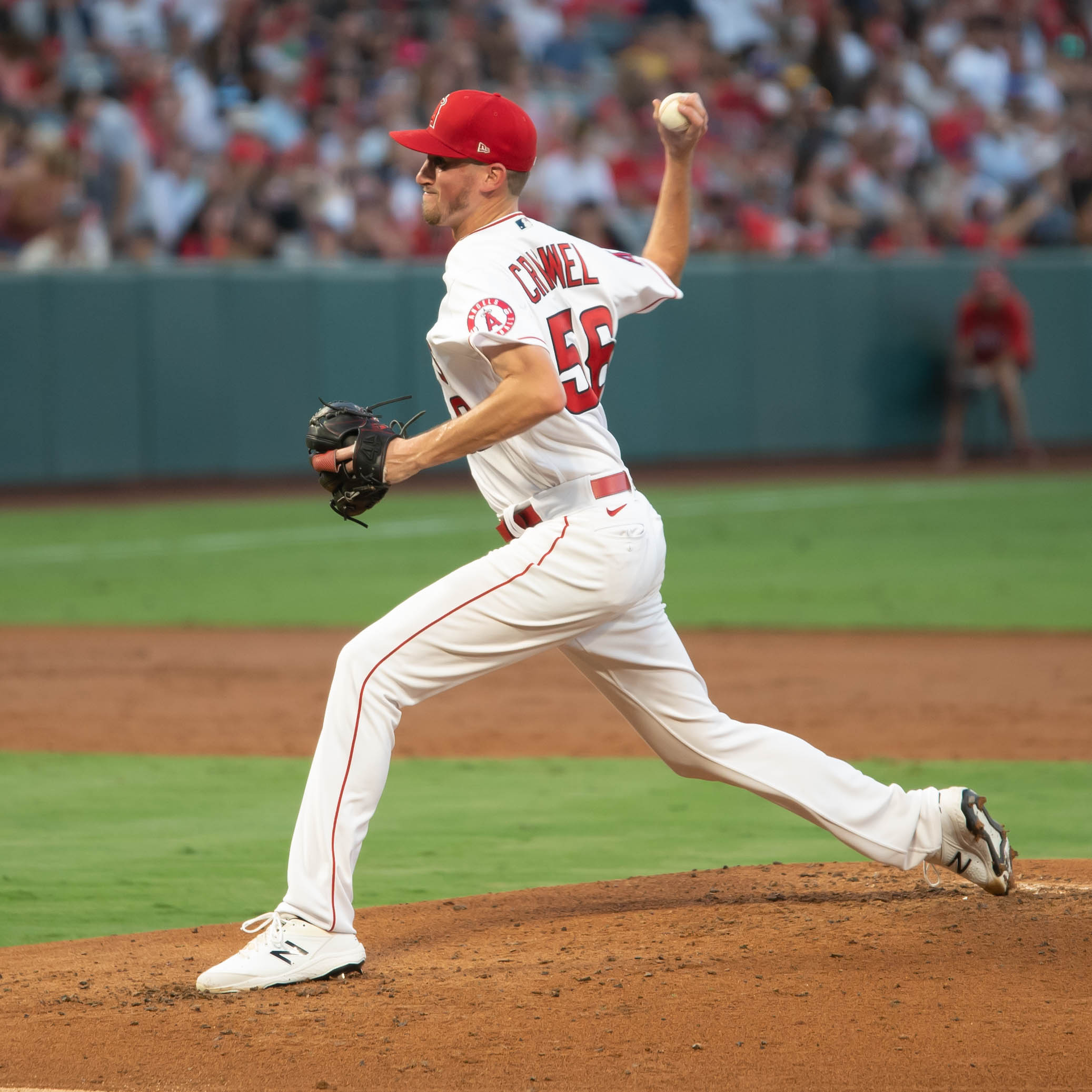
- Criswell pitching for the Angels in 2021

Seattle Mariners – No. 88
- Pitcher
- Born: July 24, 1996 (age 30); Carrollton, Georgia, U.S.
- Bats: Right Throws: Right

MLB debut
- August 27, 2021, for the Los Angeles Angels

MLB statistics (through 2026 season)
- Win–loss record: 12–9
- Earned run average: 4.24
- Strikeouts: 144
- Stats at Baseball Reference

Teams
- Los Angeles Angels (2021); Tampa Bay Rays (2022–2023); Boston Red Sox (2024–2025); Seattle Mariners (2026–present)

Cooper Timothy Criswell (born July 24, 1996) is an American professional baseball pitcher for the Seattle Mariners of Major League Baseball (MLB). He has previously played in MLB for the Los Angeles Angels, Tampa Bay Rays, and Boston Red Sox.

== Early career ==
Criswell grew up in Carrollton, Georgia and attended Carrollton High School.

Criswell began his college baseball career at Southern Union State Community College. As a sophomore, he compiled a 10–1 win–loss record with a 2.54 earned run average (ERA) then transferred to the University of North Carolina. In his lone season with the North Carolina Tar Heels, Criswell went 6–2 with a 2.99 ERA and 86 strikeouts in 75 1/3 innings pitched. On April 11, 2018, Criswell was named the Golden Spikes Award Gold Standard Performance of the Week by USA Baseball after his 13-strikeout performance against University of Miami. The 13 strikeouts were the most ever by a relief pitcher under coach Mike Fox.

== Professional career ==
=== Los Angeles Angels ===
The Los Angeles Angels selected Criswell in the 13th round of the 2018 Major League Baseball draft. He began his professional career the following year with the Inland Empire 66ers of the High-A California League. He did not play in a game in 2020 due to the cancellation of the minor league season because of the COVID-19 pandemic.

Criswell was assigned to the Double-A Rocket City Trash Pandas at the beginning of the 2021 minor league season. He made 12 starts for Double-A Rocket City, going 6–4 with a 3.71 ERA and 85 strikeouts. On July 31, Criswell was promoted to the Triple-A Salt Lake Bees. After going 2–1 with a 3.98 ERA and 27 strikeouts through four starts, on August 27, the Angels selected Criswell's contract. He made his debut the same night, giving up three runs in 1 1/3 innings pitched. He was optioned back to Salt Lake the next day.

On April 7, 2022, Criswell was placed on the 10-day injured list with a right shoulder strain and was moved to the 60-day injured list the next day to make room on the 40-man roster for Kyle Tyler.

=== Tampa Bay Rays ===
On July 16, 2022, Criswell was claimed off waivers by the Tampa Bay Rays. He was designated for assignment on July 19. He cleared waivers and was sent outright to the Triple-A Durham Bulls on July 21. He made three starts for Durham on the year, posting a 3.09 ERA with 10 strikeouts in 11 2/3 innings pitched. Criswell was selected back to the active roster as a COVID-19 replacement player on September 12. He tossed 3 1/3 innings against the Toronto Blue Jays, striking out 4 and walking one while allowing one earned run on two hits. He was removed from the 40-man roster and returned to Triple-A the next day.

Criswell was assigned to Durham to begin the 2023 season and made 3 starts before he had his contract selected to the active roster on April 17. In 10 games for the Rays, he posted a 5.73 ERA with 27 strikeouts across 33 innings of work. On November 14, Criswell was designated for assignment after multiple prospects were added to the roster.

=== Boston Red Sox ===
On December 13, 2023, the Boston Red Sox signed Criswell to a one-year, $1 million contract. Criswell was optioned to the Triple-A Worcester Red Sox to begin the 2024 season. He was recalled to Boston on April 13 to make a start against the Angels. In his Red Sox debut, Criswell pitched four innings; allowing five hits, two earned runs, a walk and four strikeouts as the Red Sox went on the defeat the Angels 7–2.

With injuries to Red Sox starting pitchers Brayan Bello, Nick Pivetta, and Garrett Whitlock, Criswell remained in the Red Sox starting rotation. On April 24, Criswell earned his first win with the Red Sox after pitching five scoreless innings in the 8–0 victory over the Cleveland Guardians. On June 1, Criswell pitched five-plus innings in the Red Sox 6–3 win over the Detroit Tigers. On June 18, Criswell was optioned to Triple-A Worcester to make room for pitcher Chris Martin who came off the injured list. Criswell was recalled to Boston on July 12. After rejoining the team, Criswell showcased his versatility as both a spot-starter and high-leverage relief pitcher.

Criswell agreed to another one-year, $1 million contract with the Red Sox for the 2025 season. After starting the season in Triple-A again, he was called up and pitched three innings in relief against the St. Louis Cardinals, giving up five runs on four hits, then was optioned after the game. Criswell would be called up a few more times throughout the season, making four more relief appearances before making his first start of the season on August 1 against the Houston Astros. Criswell threw seven innings while giving up one run and striking out four. He made seven appearances for Boston, logging a 1–0 record and 3.57 ERA with nine strikeouts and one save over 17 2/3 innings pitched. On December 4, the Red Sox designated Criswell for assignment.

=== Seattle Mariners ===
On December 5, 2025, Criswell was claimed off waivers by the New York Mets. On January 21, 2026, he was designated for assignment. Two days later, Criswell was traded to the Seattle Mariners in exchange for cash considerations. He earned a three-inning save in an 8–0 win over the Cleveland Guardians on March 29. On June 9, Criswell was placed on the injured list due to a right shoulder strain. He was transferred to the 60–day injured list on July 3. Criswell was activated on August 31, and returned to game action that same day against his former team, the Boston Red Sox, giving up the walk-off hit in the 10th inning.

== Personal life ==
Criswell's father Tim played college baseball at Georgia Perimeter College and was drafted by the San Francisco Giants with the 21st overall pick of the 1983 Major League Baseball draft.

On December 10, 2022, Criswell married his wife. In May 2023, the couple announced that they were expecting a child. On November 9, the couple welcomed a son.
