= Austin Peterson (baseball) =

American baseball player (born 1999)

Cleveland Guardians – No. 49
- Pitcher
- Born: September 19, 1999 (age 27); Valparaiso, Indiana, U.S.
- Bats: Right Throws: Right

MLB debut
- September 5, 2026, for the Cleveland Guardians

MLB statistics (through 2026 season)
- Win–loss record: 0–1
- Earned run average: 2.57
- Strikeouts: 8
- Stats at Baseball Reference

Teams
- Cleveland Guardians (2026–present)

Austin Lee Peterson (born September 19, 1999) is an American professional baseball pitcher for the Cleveland Guardians of Major League Baseball (MLB).

== Amateur career ==
Peterson attended Chesterton High School in Chesterton, Indiana, and played college baseball at Purdue University and the University of Connecticut.

== Professional career ==
Peterson was selected by the Cleveland Guardians in the ninth round of the 2023 Major League Baseball draft. He made his professional debut that year with the Lynchburg Hillcats

Peterson played 2024 with the High-A Lake County Captains and Double-A Akron RubberDucks and started 2025 with Akron. He made 28 appearances (26 starts) between Akron and the Triple-A Columbus Clippers, accumulating an 8–6 record and 3.21 ERA with 127 strikeouts across 145 2/3 innings pitched. On November 18, 2025, the Guardians added Peterson to their 40-man roster to protect him from the Rule 5 draft.

Peterson was optioned to Triple-A Columbus to begin the 2026 season. In 21 appearances (19 starts) for the team, he compiled a 5–8 record and 4.53 ERA with 102 strikeouts across 95 1/3 innings pitched. On September 4, 2026, Peterson was promoted to the major leagues for the first time.
