= Peyton Pallette =

American baseball player (born 2001)

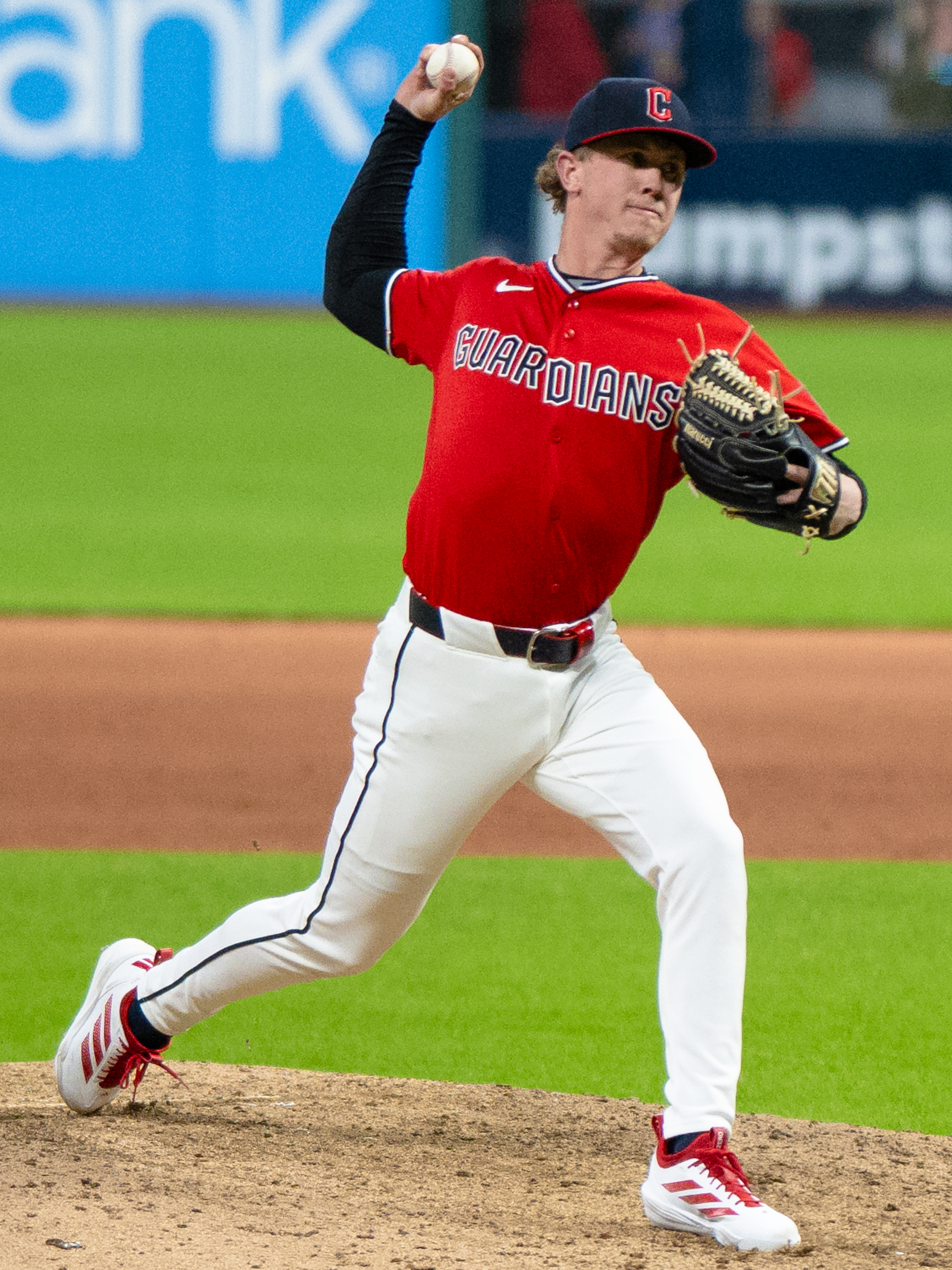
- Pallette with the Cleveland Guardians in 2026

Chicago White Sox
- Pitcher
- Born: May 9, 2001 (age 25); Little Rock, Arkansas, U.S.
- Bats: Right Throws: Right

MLB debut
- March 27, 2026, for the Cleveland Guardians

MLB statistics (through 2026 season)
- Win–loss record: 1–2
- Earned run average: 5.23
- Strikeouts: 22
- Stats at Baseball Reference

Teams
- Cleveland Guardians (2026)

Peyton Minor Pallette (born May 9, 2001) is an American professional baseball pitcher in the Chicago White Sox organization. He has played in Major League Baseball (MLB) for the Cleveland Guardians.

== Amateur career ==
Pallette attended Benton High School in Benton, Arkansas. He went unselected in the 2019 Major League Baseball draft out of high school and enrolled at the University of Arkansas to play college baseball for the Razorbacks.

As a freshman at Arkansas in 2020, Pallette made four relief appearances before the season was cancelled due to the COVID-19 pandemic. That summer, he played in the California Collegiate League for the Santa Barbara Foresters, where he was a part of a combined no-hitter. In 2021, Pallette moved in to the Arkansas starting rotation. He was pulled in the middle of a game in mid-May with arm pain and missed the remainder of the season. Over 15 games (11 starts), Pallette went 1–2 with a 4.02 ERA and 67 strikeouts over 56 innings. He was slated to play in Cape Cod Baseball League but did not make an appearance due to his injury. Pallette returned to in-game action with the Razorbacks during their 2021 fall camp. Pallette entered the 2022 season as a top prospect for the upcoming draft. However, prior to the start of the season, it was announced that Pallette would undergo Tommy John surgery, forcing him to miss all of the 2022 season.

== Professional career ==
=== Chicago White Sox ===
The Chicago White Sox selected Pallette in the second round, with the 62nd overall pick, of the 2022 Major League Baseball draft. He signed with the team for $1.50 million.

Pallette made his professional debut in 2023 and was assigned to the Kannapolis Cannon Ballers of the Single-A Carolina League. Over 22 starts, he went 0–4 with a 4.13 ERA and 78 strikeouts over 72 innings. He was assigned to the Winston-Salem Dash of the High-A South Atlantic League to open the 2024 season. In mid-August, he was promoted to the Birmingham Barons of the Double-A Southern League, and also moved to the bullpen full time. Over 32 games (12 starts) between the two teams, Pallette went 4–8 with a 4.37 ERA and 95 strikeouts over 82 1/3 innings. He was assigned back to Birmingham to open the 2025 season and was promoted to the Charlotte Knights of the Triple-A International League in May. Pallette made 52 relief appearances with both clubs and went 2–3 with a 4.06 ERA, 86 strikeouts and 11 saves over 64 1/3 innings.

=== Cleveland Guardians ===
On December 10, 2025, the Cleveland Guardians selected Pallette in the major league phase of the Rule 5 draft. On March 20, 2026, the Guardians announced that Pallette had made the team's Opening Day roster. On April 21, Pallette recorded his first career win after pitching a scoreless inning of relief against the Houston Astros. He made 16 appearances for Cleveland, compiling a 1–2 record and 5.23 ERA with 22 strikeouts across 20 2/3 innings pitched. On May 24, Pallette was designated for assignment by the Guardians.

=== Chicago White Sox (second stint) ===
On May 30, 2026, Pallette was returned to the Chicago White Sox after going unclaimed on outright waivers. The White Sox assigned him to Triple-A Charlotte and he pitched in 25 games in which he had a 3–1 record, a 3.21 ERA, 46 strikeouts, and 25 walks across 33 2/3 innings.

== See also ==
- Rule 5 draft results
