= Colin Holderman =

American baseball player (born 1995)

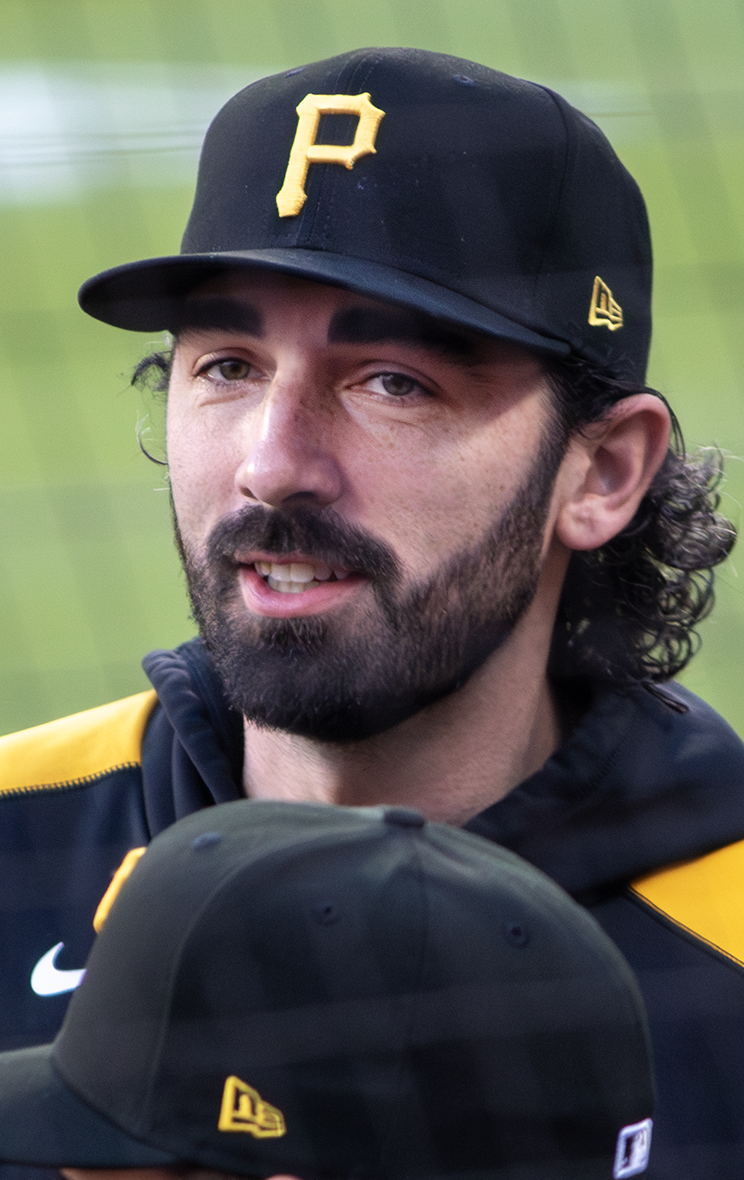
- Holderman with the Pittsburgh Pirates in 2025

Cleveland Guardians – No. 35
- Pitcher
- Born: October 8, 1995 (age 31); Bourbonnais, Illinois, U.S.
- Bats: Right Throws: Right

MLB debut
- May 15, 2022, for the New York Mets

MLB statistics (through 2026 season)
- Win–loss record: 14–15
- Earned run average: 3.79
- Strikeouts: 206
- Stats at Baseball Reference

Teams
- New York Mets (2022); Pittsburgh Pirates (2022–2025); Cleveland Guardians (2026–present)

Colin Scott Holderman (born October 8, 1995) is an American professional baseball pitcher for the Cleveland Guardians of Major League Baseball (MLB). He has previously played in MLB for the New York Mets and Pittsburgh Pirates.

== Amateur career ==
Holderman graduated from Bradley-Bourbonnais Community High School in Bradley, Illinois, in 2014. He enrolled at Southern Illinois University to play college baseball for the Southern Illinois Salukis. After one year, he transferred to Heartland Community College. He was named the National Junior College Athletic Association's Division II Baseball Player of the Year. Holderman committed to transfer to Mississippi State University after one year at Heartland.

== Professional career ==
=== New York Mets ===
The New York Mets selected Holderman in the ninth round (280th overall) of the 2016 MLB draft and he signed with the Mets rather than transfer to Mississippi State. He began his professional career with the Kingsport Mets of the Rookie-level Appalachian League. He began the 2017 season with the Columbia Fireflies of the Single-A South Atlantic League, but underwent Tommy John surgery on April 4, 2018. He missed the 2018 season while recovering from the surgery.

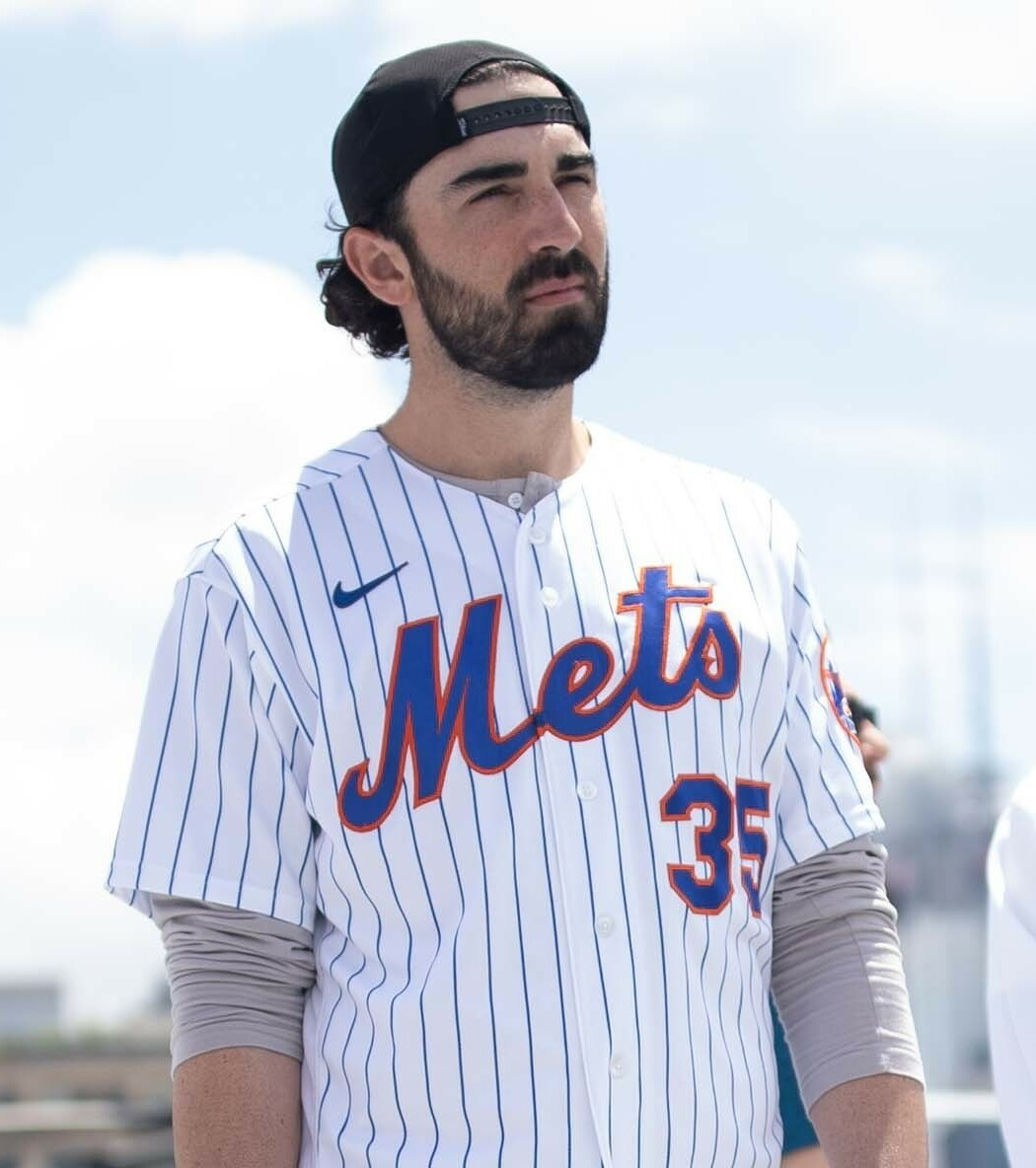
Holderman in 2022

Holderman returned to action in 2019 with the Low-A Brooklyn Cyclones, Columbia, and the High-A St. Lucie Mets. In 16 appearances (15 starts) split between the three affiliates, he posted a cumulative 4–2 record and 3.53 ERA with 49 strikeouts across 66 1/3 innings pitched. Holderman did not play in a game in 2020 due to the cancellation of the minor league season because of the COVID-19 pandemic.

In 2021, Holderman pitched for the Binghamton Rumble Ponies of the Double-A Eastern League. He had a 3.38 earned run average and served as Binghamton's closer. Assigned to the Arizona Fall League after the regular season, he had a 8.71 earned run average during 11 games and the Mets opted not to add him to their 40-man roster to protect him from the Rule 5 draft. He began the 2022 season with the Syracuse Mets of the Triple-A International League. The Mets promoted Holderman to the major leagues on May 15, 2022. He made his major league debut that afternoon at Citi Field and pitched a scoreless ninth inning against the Seattle Mariners.

=== Pittsburgh Pirates ===
On July 22, 2022, the Mets traded Holderman to the Pittsburgh Pirates in exchange for Daniel Vogelbach. The Pirates subsequently assigned him to the Triple-A Indianapolis Indians and promoted him to the major leagues on August 2. In nine appearances for Pittsburgh down the stretch, Holderman posted a 1–0 record and 6.75 ERA with six strikeouts across 10 2/3 innings pitched.

On May 4, 2023, Holderman pitched an immaculate inning against the Tampa Bay Rays, retiring Taylor Walls, Luke Raley, and Christian Bethancourt in order. In 58 appearances out of the bullpen for Pittsburgh, he compiled an 0–3 record and 3.86 ERA with 58 strikeouts and two saves over 56 innings of work.

Holderman made 55 appearances out of the bullpen for Pittsburgh during the 2024 season, registering a 3–6 record and 3.16 ERA with 56 strikeouts across 51 1/3 innings pitched.

Holderman made 24 appearances for the Pirates in 2025, but struggled to an 0–2 record and 7.01 ERA with 18 strikeouts and one save across 25 2/3 innings pitched. On November 18, 2025, Holderman was designated for assignment by Pittsburgh. On November 21, he was non-tendered by the Pirates and became a free agent.

=== Cleveland Guardians ===
On December 11, 2025, Holderman signed a one-year, $1.5 million contract with the Cleveland Guardians.

== Personal life ==
Holderman was raised with an older sister, Taylor, who has Angelman syndrome, younger brother Casey, and younger sister Cassidy.

Holderman married his wife, Casey Spence, in December 2020. In May 2023, Holderman and his wife announced they were expecting a child in November 2023. They had a daughter, Tanner.

Holderman is a Christian.

In March 2024, Holderman was hospitalized with a severe case of Influenza A virus.
