= Chase DeLauter =

American baseball player (born 2001)

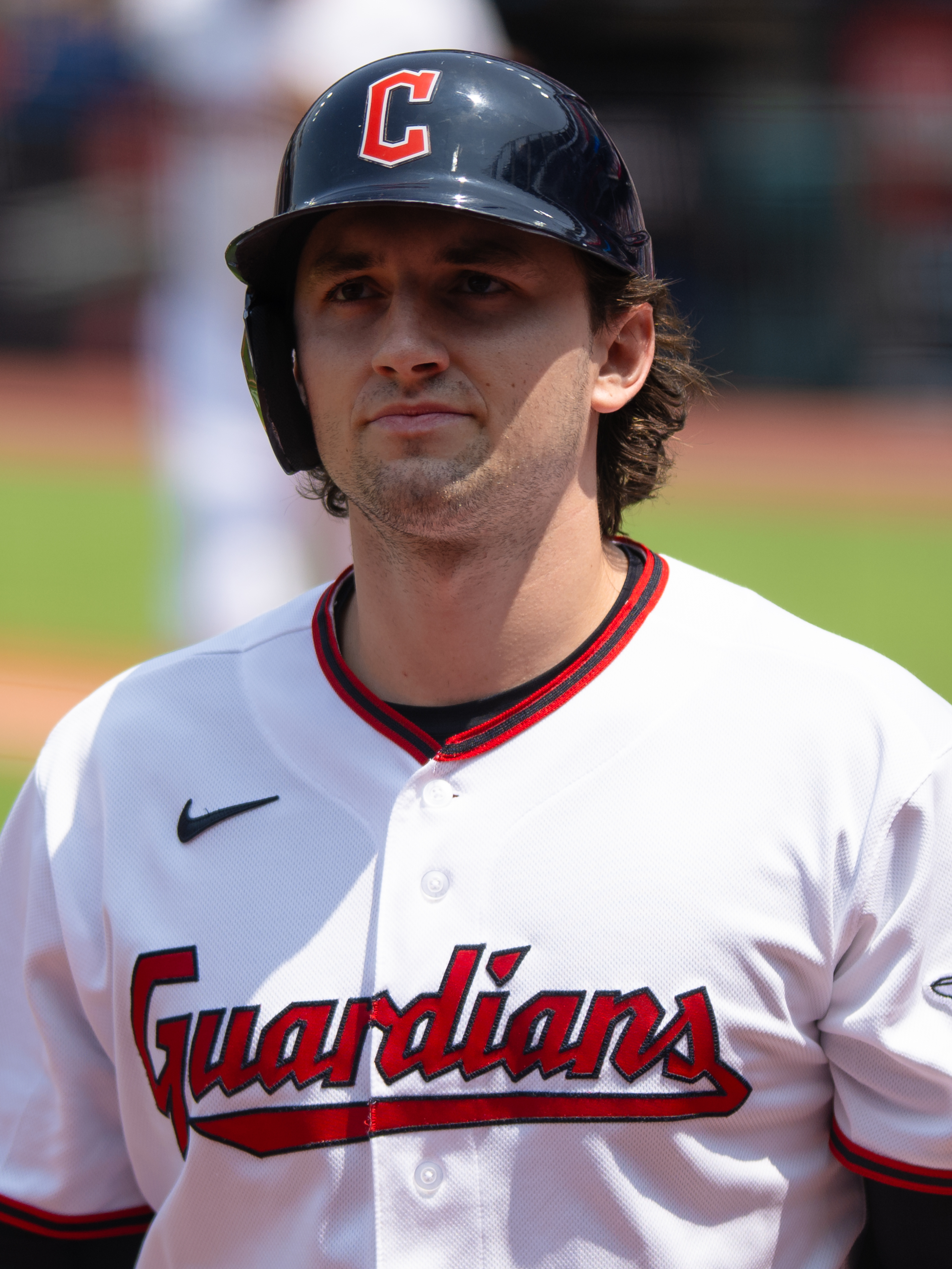
- DeLauter with the Cleveland Guardians in 2026

Cleveland Guardians – No. 24
- Outfielder
- Born: October 8, 2001 (age 25); Frederick, Maryland, U.S.
- Bats: Left Throws: Left

MLB debut
- October 1, 2025, for the Cleveland Guardians

MLB statistics (through 2026 season)
- Batting average: .287
- Home runs: 16
- Runs batted in: 67
- Stats at Baseball Reference

Teams
- Cleveland Guardians (2025–present)

Career highlights and awards
- Silver Slugger Award (2026)

Chase Daniel DeLauter (born October 8, 2001) is an American professional baseball outfielder for the Cleveland Guardians of Major League Baseball (MLB). He played college baseball at James Madison University and was selected by the Guardians in the first round of the 2022 MLB draft. He made his MLB debut with the Guardians in 2025.

== Amateur career ==
DeLauter was born in Frederick, Maryland, and grew up in Martinsburg, West Virginia. He attended Hedgesville High School in Hedgesville, West Virginia, where he played football, basketball, and baseball. In 2018, as a junior, he batted .500 and also pitched to a 1.95 ERA with 64 strikeouts. As a senior in 2019, he went 9-2 with a 0.84 ERA over 66 innings alongside hitting .606 with eight home runs, 52 RBI, and 21 doubles. He was named the Gatorade Player of the Year for the state of West Virginia.

After graduating high school, DeLauter enrolled at James Madison University to play college baseball for the James Madison Dukes. As a freshman in 2020, DeLauter earned a starting spot and batted .382 with 26 hits and 14 RBI over 16 games before the season was cancelled due to the COVID-19 pandemic. In those 16 starts, he reached base safely in his first 15 games of the season, setting the new JMU school record. He earned Freshman All-American honors from Collegiate Baseball Newspaper. He played in the Rockingham County Baseball League for the Broadway Bruins that summer where he batted .527 with 18 home runs and 45 RBI over thirty games. In 2021, as a redshirt freshman, he slashed .386/.500/.723 with six home runs, 21 RBI, and a 1.231 OPS over 26 games. He missed two games during the season due to injury. Following the season's end, he played collegiate summer baseball for the Orleans Firebirds of the Cape Cod Baseball League where he was named a league all-star and earned the Robert A. McNeese Outstanding Pro Prospect Award after batting .298 with nine home runs over 34 games. DeLauter entered the 2022 season as a top prospect for the upcoming draft. In early April, he broke his foot and missed the remainder of the season. Over 24 games before the injury, he batted .437 with eight home runs and 35 RBI. Following the season's end, he traveled to San Diego where he participated in the Draft Combine.

== Professional career ==
=== Minor leagues ===
The Cleveland Guardians selected DeLauter in the first round with the 16th overall selection of the 2022 Major League Baseball draft. He signed with the team for $3.75 million. He did not play for the organization in 2022 due to a broken foot he suffered in the spring.

On January 10, 2023, DeLauter underwent surgery to address a fracture in the fifth toe of his left foot, sidelining him for 4-5 months. He made his professional debut in June with the rookie-level Arizona Complex League Guardians and was later promoted to the High-A Lake County Captains and Double-A Akron RubberDucks. Over 57 games, DeLauter batted .355 with five home runs and 39 RBI. After the season, he was selected to play in the Arizona Fall League for the Peoria Javelinas.

DeLauter was assigned to Akron to open the 2024 season. DeLauter was promoted to the Triple-A Columbus Clippers on August 19. He missed time during the season due to a foot fracture, turf toe, and a hamstring injury. Across 39 appearances split between Columbus, Akron, and a rehab assignment with the ACL Guardians, he batted an aggregate .261/.342/.500 with eight home runs and 24 RBI.

On March 4, 2025, it was announced that DeLauter had undergone surgery to address a core muscle/sports hernia injury, and would miss 8-to-12 weeks as a result. On July 23, it was announced that DeLauter would miss 6-to-8 weeks after undergoing surgery to repair a right hamate fracture. He made a total of 42 appearances for Columbus and the ACL Guardians during the 2025 season, slashing .264/.379/.473 with seven home runs, 24 RBI, and one stolen base. He was initially assigned to play in the Arizona Fall League with the Surprise Saguaros after the season.

=== Major leagues ===
Following the 2025 Guardians qualifying for the postseason, DeLauter was selected to the major league roster on September 30, for the Guardians' roster in the 2025 American League Wild Card Series against the Detroit Tigers. He made his major league debut the following day, becoming the seventh player to make his major league debut in a postseason game, following Ryan Weathers, Shane McClanahan, Alex Kirilloff, Adalberto Mondesí, Mark Kiger, and Bug Holliday. On October 2, DeLauter recorded his first career hit, a single off of Tigers starter Jack Flaherty.

DeLauter was named to Cleveland's Opening Day roster for the 2026 season. He made his regular-season MLB debut during Cleveland's season opener on March 26, 2026, where he recorded his first three career regular season hits, going three-for-five with two solo home runs off of Logan Gilbert and Cooper Criswell in a 6-4 Guardians win over the Seattle Mariners. On June 17, 2026, DeLauter was placed on the injured list with a right side rib fracture. He was activated on June 28. DeLauter ended the 2026 season with a .287/.363/.457 slash line, 16 home runs, 67 RBI, and 30 doubles across 133 games.

Awards
Preceded by Kazuma Okamoto	American League Rookie of the Month; July 2026	Succeeded by Tristan Peters
