= Franco Alemán =

Cuban baseball player (born 2000)

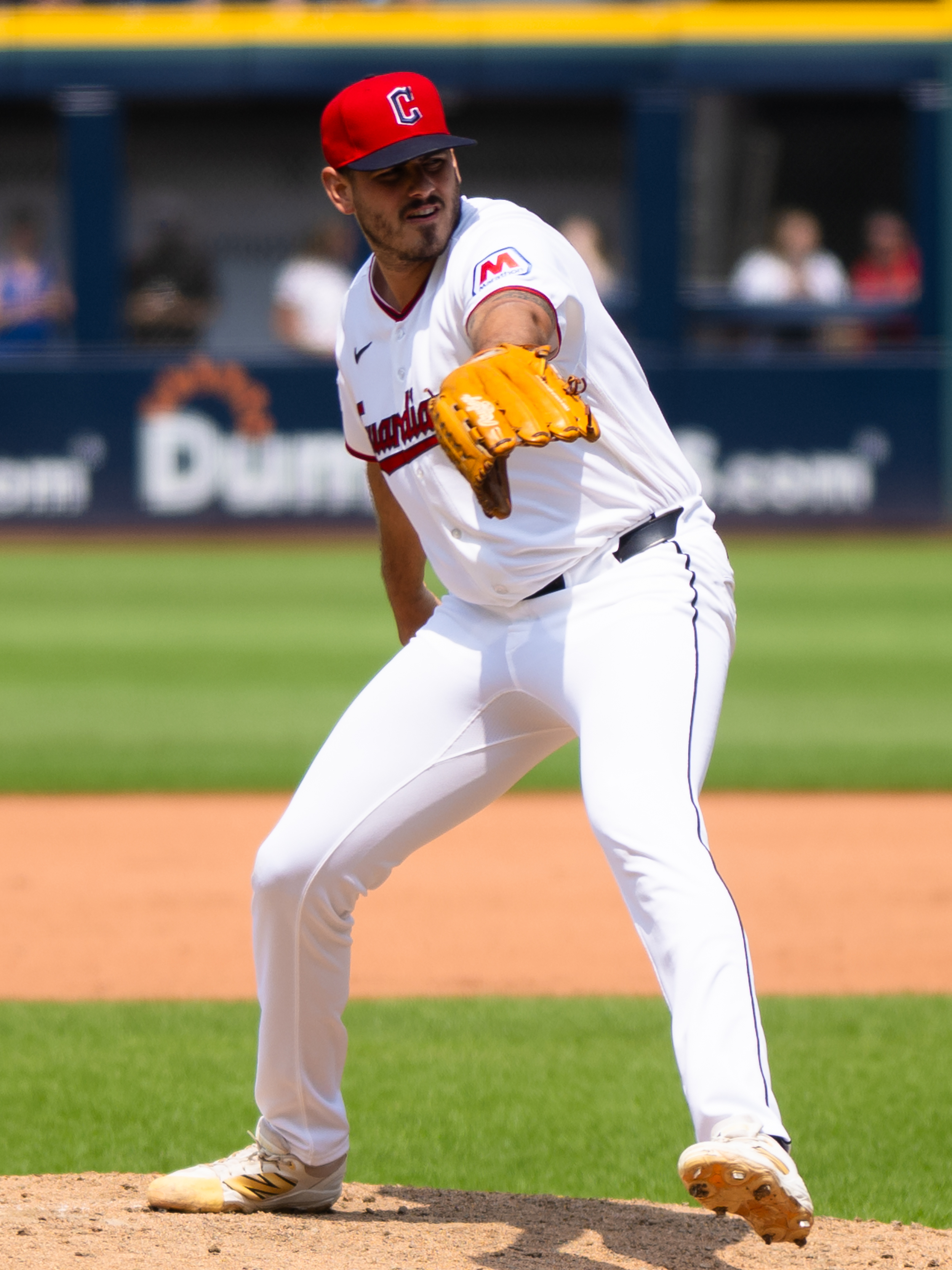
- Alemán with the Cleveland Guardians in 2026

Cleveland Guardians – No. 55
- Pitcher
- Born: June 26, 2000 (age 26); Yaguajay, Cuba
- Bats: Right Throws: Right

MLB debut
- May 10, 2026, for the Cleveland Guardians

MLB statistics (through 2026 season)
- Win–loss record: 0–1
- Earned run average: 4.43
- Strikeouts: 28
- Stats at Baseball Reference

Teams
- Cleveland Guardians (2026–present)

Franco Alemán (born June 26, 2000) is a Cuban professional baseball pitcher for the Cleveland Guardians of Major League Baseball (MLB). He made his MLB debut in 2026.

== Amateur career ==
Alemán was born in Cuba and defected to the United States with his family when he was 11. He attended Braulio Alonso High School in Tampa, Florida. He was selected by the Atlanta Braves in the 38th round of the 2018 Major League Baseball draft, but did not sign. Alemán started his college baseball career at Florida International University (FIU) for a year before transferring to St. Johns River State College and then the University of Florida. In 2019, he played collegiate summer baseball with the Falmouth Commodores of the Cape Cod Baseball League.

== Professional career ==
After one year at Florida, Alemán was selected by the Cleveland Indians in the 10th round of the 2021 MLB draft, and signed. He made his professional debut in 2022 with the Lynchburg Hillcats. He pitched 2023 with the Lake County Captains and Akron RubberDucks.

Alemán spent 2024 with the Triple–A Columbus Clippers, making 24 appearances and logging a 1.99 ERA with 34 strikeouts and 2 saves across 22 2/3 innings pitched.

On November 19, 2024, the Guardians added Alemán to their 40-man roster to protect him from the Rule 5 draft. On February 27, 2025, Alemán was ruled out for 4–6 weeks after undergoing surgery for a left hip inguinal hernia. He would go on to make 37 relief appearances for Columbus, but struggled to a 2–5 record and 7.85 ERA with 57 strikeouts and five saves across 36 2/3 innings pitched.

Alemán was optioned to Triple-A Columbus to begin the 2026 season, where he recorded 13 scoreless appearances with 18 strikeouts and three saves. On May 8, 2026, Alemán was promoted to the major leagues for the first time.
