= Ángel Genao =

Dominican baseball player (born 2004)

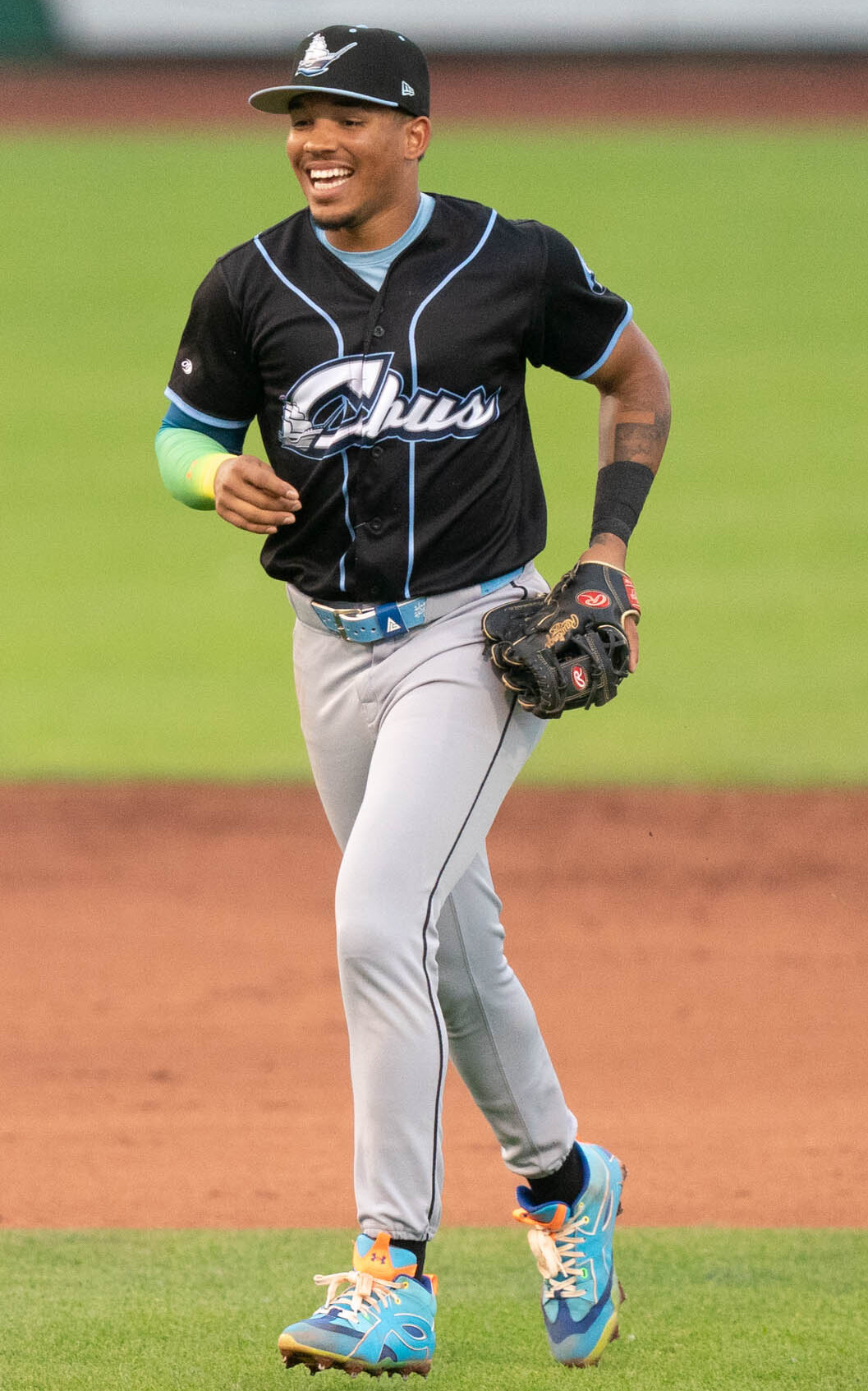
- Genao with the Columbus Clippers in 2026

Cleveland Guardians – No. 17
- Infielder
- Born: May 19, 2004 (age 22); Castillo, Dominican Republic
- Bats: Switch Throws: Right

MLB debut
- August 5, 2026, for the Cleveland Guardians

MLB statistics (through 2026 season)
- Batting average: .213
- Home runs: 2
- Runs batted in: 6
- Stats at Baseball Reference

Teams
- Cleveland Guardians (2026–present)

Ángel Luis Genao (born May 19, 2004) is a Dominican professional baseball infielder for the Cleveland Guardians of Major League Baseball (MLB). He made his MLB debut in 2026.

== Early life ==
Genao represented the Dominican Republic and the Caribbean region in the 2017 Little League World Series.

== Professional career ==
Genao signed with the Cleveland Guardians as an international free agent on January 15, 2021. He made his professional debut that year with the Dominican Summer League Guardians.

Genao spent 2022 with the Arizona Complex League Guardians and Lynchburg Hillcats. In 2023, he remained with the Hillcats for the full season.

On June 3, 2024, Genao was promoted to the High-A Lake County Captains. Genao was part of Lake County's first Midwest League Champion team since 2010.

Genao played primarily for the Double-A Akron RubberDucks, slashing .259/.323/.359 with two home runs, 37 RBI, and six stolen bases across 77 games. On November 18, 2025, the Guardians added Genao to their 40-man roster to protect him from the Rule 5 draft.

Genao was optioned to the Triple-A Columbus Clippers to begin the 2026 season. On August 5, 2026, the Guardians promoted Genao to the major leagues and he made his debut on the same day as a third baseman against the New York Mets. He became the first player in franchise history to have four hits in their debut. On August 9, Genao hit his first career home run off of Jordan Hicks of the Chicago White Sox.
