= Erik Sabrowski =

Canadian baseball player (born 1997)

Cleveland Guardians – No. 62
- Pitcher
- Born: October 31, 1997 (age 28); Edmonton, Alberta, Canada
- Bats: Right Throws: Left

MLB debut
- September 4, 2024, for the Cleveland Guardians

MLB statistics (through 2026 season)
- Win–loss record: 5–3
- Earned run average: 1.99
- Strikeouts: 137
- Stats at Baseball Reference

Teams
- Cleveland Guardians (2024–present)

Erik Wayne Thomas Sabrowski (born October 31, 1997) is a Canadian professional baseball pitcher for the Cleveland Guardians of Major League Baseball (MLB).

== Professional career ==
=== San Diego Padres ===
Sabrowski was drafted by the San Diego Padres with the 411th overall selection of the 2018 Major League Baseball draft. However, he underwent Tommy John surgery shortly after being drafted and missed the 2019 season as a result. Sabrowski did not play in a game in 2020 due to the cancellation of the minor league season because of the COVID-19 pandemic.

Sabrowski made his professional debut in 2021 with the High–A Fort Wayne TinCaps, recording a 1.86 ERA with 41 strikeouts over 8 games (3 starts).

=== Cleveland Guardians ===
On December 8, 2021, Sabrowski was selected by the Cleveland Guardians in the minor league phase of the Rule 5 draft. However, as a result of undergoing a second Tommy John surgery in 2021, he missed the entire 2022 campaign. Sabrowski returned to action in 2023 with the Double–A Akron RubberDucks, compiling a 4–0 record and 2.49 ERA with 28 strikeouts across 20 appearances out of the bullpen.

Sabrowski began the 2024 season with Akron, and was promoted to the Triple–A Columbus Clippers in May. In 36 appearances split between the two affiliates, he accumulated an 8–3 record and 3.51 ERA with 79 strikeouts over 48 2/3 innings pitched.

On August 28, 2024, Sabrowski was selected to the 40-man roster and promoted to the major leagues for the first time. He made his MLB debut on September 4, striking out the first batter he faced and pitching 1 1/3 innings in relief for Cleveland, allowing one hit and striking out two batters. He also became the 5th player from Edmonton to appear in the major leagues.

Sabrowski began the 2025 season on the injured list due to inflammation in his pitching elbow. He was transferred to the 60-day injured list on April 26. Sabrowski was activated to make his season debut on June 27.

== See also ==
- Rule 5 draft results
