= Foster Griffin =

American baseball player (born 1995)

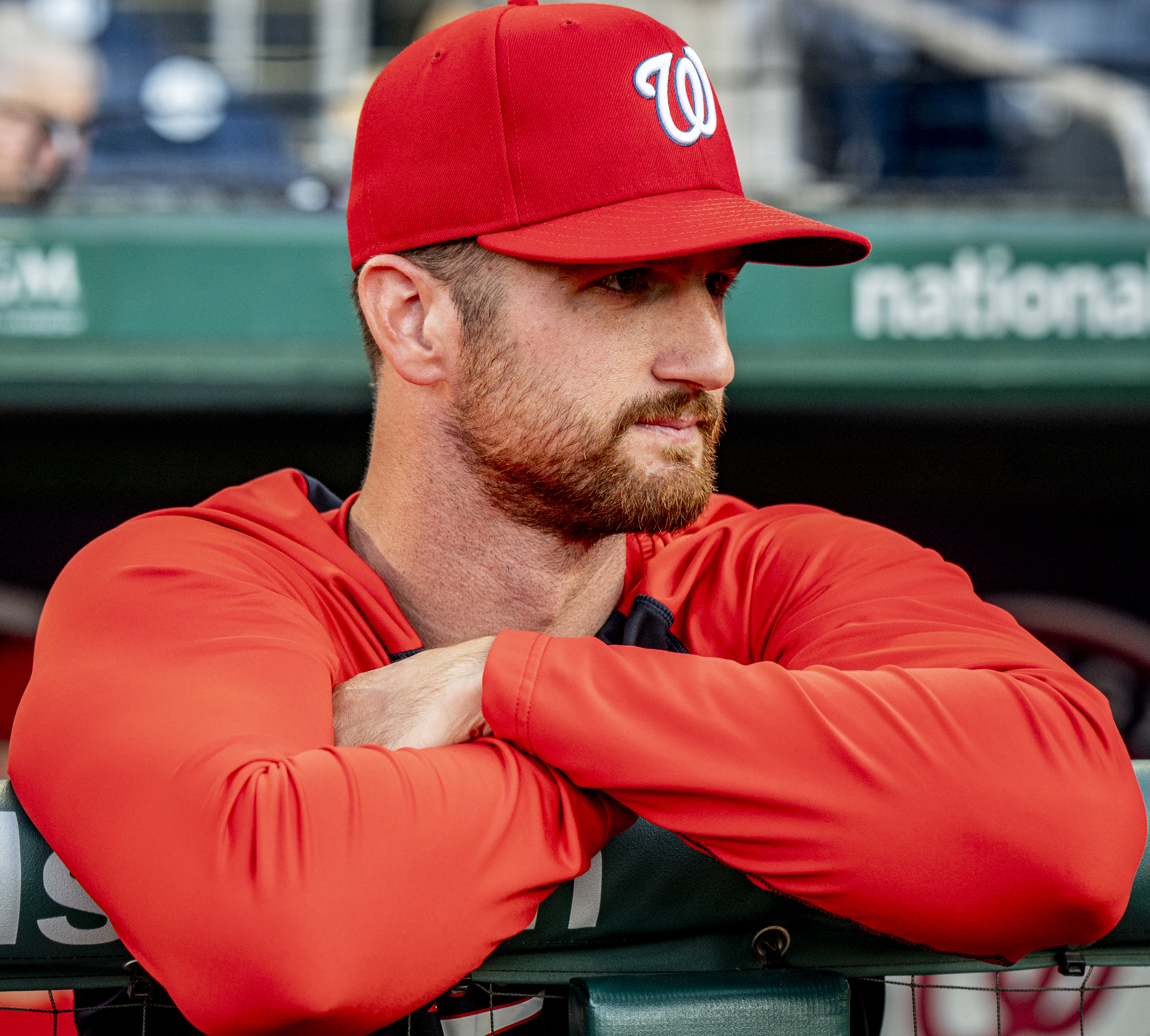
- Griffin with the Washington Nationals in 2026

Free agent
- Pitcher
- Born: July 27, 1995 (age 31); Orlando, Florida, U.S.
- Bats: Right Throws: Left

Professional debut
- MLB: July 27, 2020, for the Kansas City Royals
- NPB: April 1, 2023, for the Yomiuri Giants

MLB statistics (through 2026 season)
- Win–loss record: 16–6
- Earned run average: 3.74
- Strikeouts: 163

NPB statistics (through 2025 season)
- Win–loss record: 18–10
- Earned run average: 2.57
- Strikeouts: 318
- Stats at Baseball Reference

Teams
- Kansas City Royals (2020, 2022); Toronto Blue Jays (2022); Yomiuri Giants (2023–2025); Washington Nationals (2026); Cleveland Guardians (2026)

Career highlights and awards
- MLB All-Star (2026); NPB All-Star (2025)

Fred Foster Griffin (born July 27, 1995) is an American professional baseball pitcher who is a free agent. He has played in Major League Baseball (MLB) for the Kansas City Royals, Toronto Blue Jays, Washington Nationals, and Cleveland Guardians, and in Nippon Professional Baseball (NPB) for the Yomiuri Giants.

The Royals selected Griffin in the first round of the 2014 MLB draft, and he made his MLB debut with the team in 2020. After his debut, he had Tommy John surgery. After a brief return to the majors in 2022, he signed with Yomiuri. He was an NPB All-Star in 2025. Griffin was named to his first MLB All-Star game in 2026.

== Career ==
=== Kansas City Royals ===
Griffin attended The First Academy in Orlando, Florida. The Kansas City Royals selected him in the first round of the 2014 Major League Baseball draft. He signed on June 10, and was assigned to the Burlington Royals, where he posted a 3.21 ERA in 28 innings pitched. Griffin spent 2015 with the Lexington Legends where he went 4–6 with a 5.44 ERA. In 2016, Griffin split time between Lexington and the Wilmington Blue Rocks, where he posted a combined 6–4 record and a 5.43 ERA between the two teams. He spent 2017 with both Wilmington and the Northwest Arkansas Naturals where he went a combined 15–7 with a 3.35 ERA between both clubs, and 2018 back with the Naturals where he pitched to a 10–12 record with a 5.13 ERA in 28 games (26 starts). He spent 2019 with the Omaha Storm Chasers, going 8–6 with a 5.23 ERA over 25 starts, striking out 111 over 130 2/3 innings. Griffin was added to the Royals 40-man roster following the 2019 season.

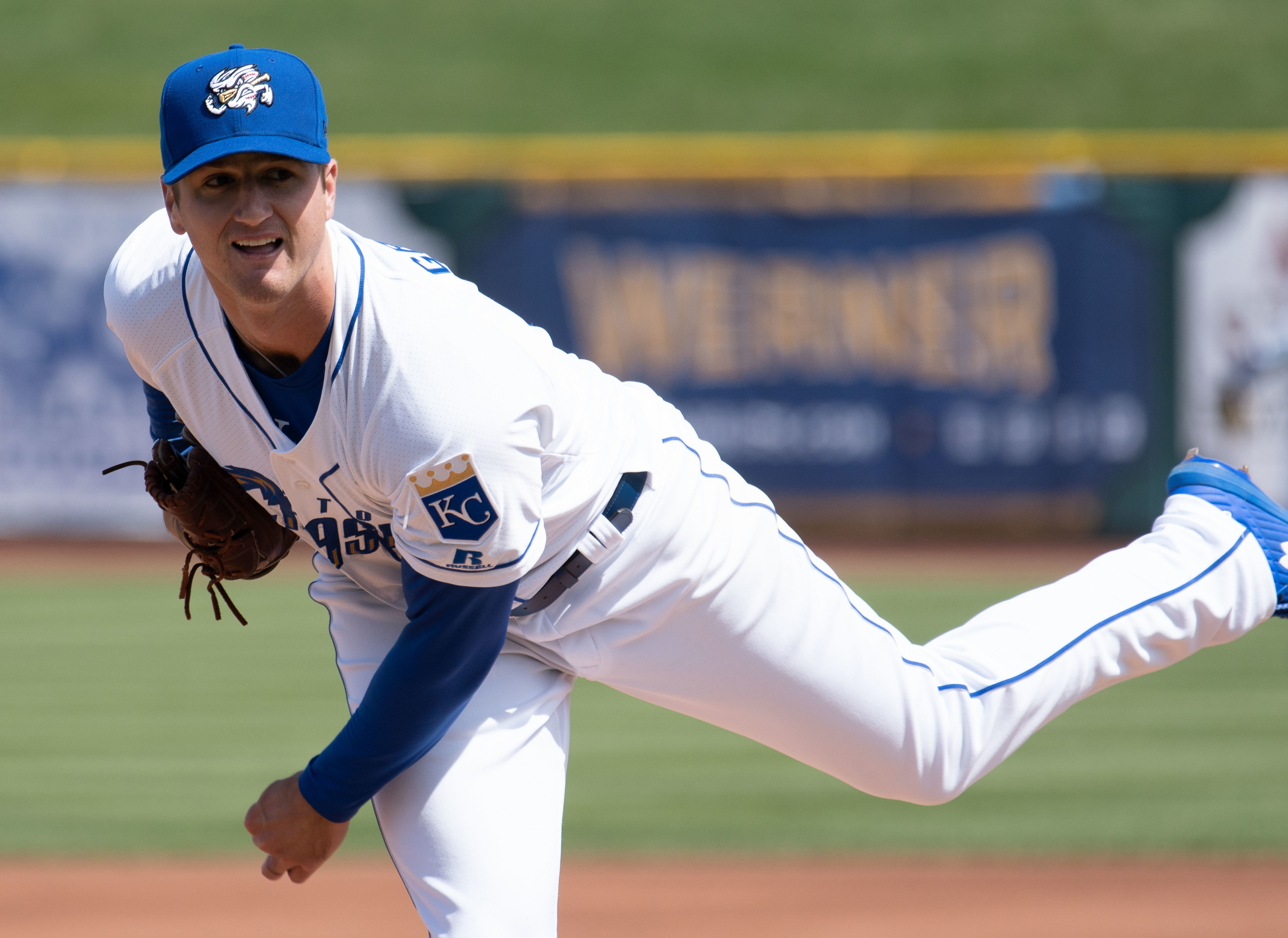
Griffin with the Omaha Storm Chasers in 2019

Griffin made his major league debut on July 27, 2020 (his 25th birthday), pitching 1 2/3 scoreless innings to earn the win against the Detroit Tigers. On August 11, Griffin underwent Tommy John surgery. On November 30, Griffin was designated for assignment. On December 2, the Royals non-tendered Griffin, making him a free agent. On December 12, Griffin re-signed with the Royals on a minor league contract.

Griffin made 15 rehab appearances with five Royals minor league affiliates in 2021. He began the 2022 season with the Triple-A Omaha Storm Chasers. On May 20, 2022, Griffin had his contract selected by the Royals. He pitched in five games before the Royals designated him for assignment on July 11.

=== Toronto Blue Jays ===
On July 16, 2022, Griffin was traded to the Toronto Blue Jays in exchange for Jonatan Bernal. Griffin pitched only once for Toronto, tossing two scoreless innings with two strikeouts. The rest of his season was spent with the Triple-A Buffalo Bisons, where he pitched to a pristine 2.31 ERA and 2-0 record with 25 strikeouts in 23 1/3 innings pitched. He was released on November 15.

=== Yomiuri Giants ===
On January 12, 2023, Griffin signed with the Yomiuri Giants of Nippon Professional Baseball. On May 13, Griffin hit a triple off of Masato Morishita of the Hiroshima Toyo Carp. He became the first Yomiuri non-Japanese pitcher to hit a triple since Toru Nishida in 1952. In his first season in Japan, he was 6–5 with a 2.75 ERA in 20 games. Griffin signed a two-year contract extension for the 2024 season on November 26. He had similar results in 2024, going 6–4 with a 3.01 ERA in 20 games.

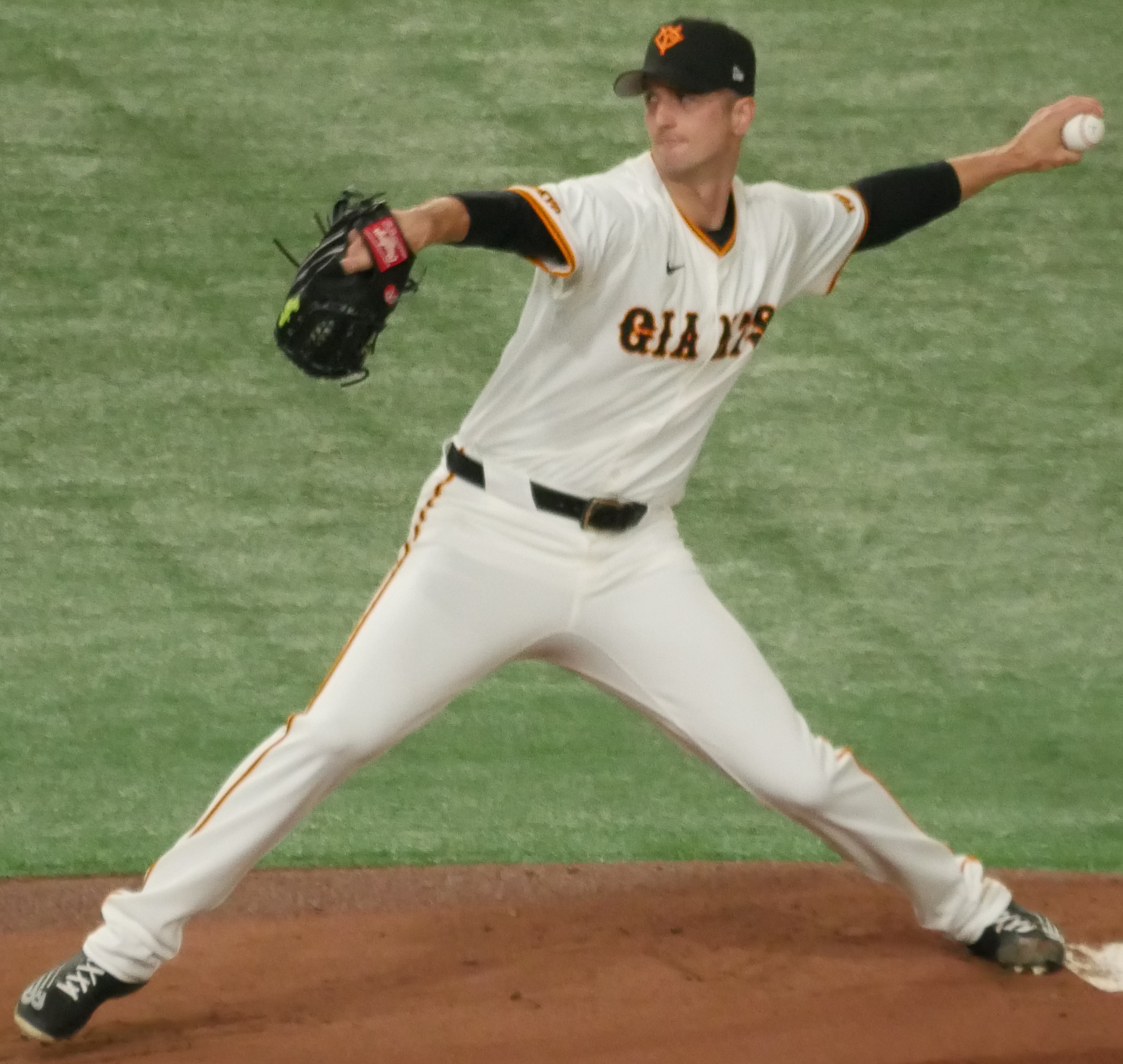
Griffin in 2024

Griffin was named an NPB All-Star in 2025. In 14 appearances for the Giants, he compiled a 6-1 record and 1.62 ERA with 77 strikeouts over 78 innings of work. On December 2, 2025, Griffin and Yomiuri parted ways.

=== Washington Nationals ===
On December 22, 2025, Griffin signed a one-year, $5.5 million contract with the Washington Nationals. On July 11, 2026, Griffin was named to the National League All–Star Team as a replacement for Cincinnati Reds starter Chase Burns. He made 22 starts for the Nationals, compiling a 12–3 record and 3.06 ERA with 116 strikeouts across 129 1/3 innings pitched.

=== Cleveland Guardians ===
On August 3, 2026, the Nationals traded Griffin to the Cleveland Guardians in exchange for Will Dion, Josh Hartle, Kendeglys Virguez, and Nick Mitchell.
