= 2025 Cleveland Guardians season =

2025 Cleveland Guardians
- American League Central champions
- League: American League
- Division: Central
- Ballpark: Progressive Field
- City: Cleveland, Ohio
- Record: 88–74 (.543)
- Divisional place: 1st
- Owners: Paul Dolan
- President of baseball operations: Chris Antonetti
- General managers: Mike Chernoff
- Manager: Stephen Vogt
- Television: MLB.tv (Matt Underwood, Rick Manning, Chris Gimenez, Andre Knott, Al Pawlowski, Jensen Lewis, Pat Tabler)
- Radio: English: WTAM · WMMS (Tom Hamilton, Jim Rosenhaus, Tim Belcher, Charles Nagy, Pat Tabler); Spanish: WARF (Rafa Hernández-Brito, Carlos Baerga)

The 2025 Cleveland Guardians season was the 125th season for the franchise, which competes in the American League of Major League Baseball (MLB). On July 6, they were 15.5 games back of the first place Detroit Tigers and were as many as 11 games back on September 4. However, the Guardians surged while the Tigers collapsed and took the American League Central lead on September 23 with a win over the Tigers. With the Guardians having trailed Detroit by 15.5 games in July, this ranked as the largest divisional comeback in MLB history. In addition to the historic division comeback, the Guardians also became the fifth team to make the playoffs while being sub-.500 on September 4 or later.

On September 27, with a walk-off win over the Texas Rangers, the Guardians clinched a postseason berth, taking the sixth and final postseason spot in the American League. On September 28, with the Tigers' loss to the Red Sox, the Guardians clinched the American League Central division for the second consecutive time and the sixth time in ten years (2016–2018, 2022, 2024–2025). However, they lost to the Tigers in the Wild Card Series.

== Offseason ==
=== Coaching changes ===
On October 24, 2024, the Cincinnati Reds hired hitting coach Chris Valaika away from the team. Valaika was reunited with former Indians/Guardians manager Terry Francona, who was hired by the Reds on October 4. Grant Fink was promoted to replace Valaika on November 13, 2024.

=== Transactions ===
==== October 2024 ====
| October 1 | Recalled 3B Gabriel Arias; RHP's Peter Strzelecki and Daniel Espino; LHP Logan Allen; RF's Johnathan Rodríguez and George Valera; SS Juan Brito; CF Tyler Freeman; RHP's Triston McKenzie and Connor Gillispie from Columbus Clippers. RHP Alex Cobb roster status changed. |
| October 5 | RHP Nick Sandlin and RHP Ben Lively roster status changed. Activated RHP Alex Cobb. RHP Pedro Ávila and CF Myles Straw roster status changed. Activated CF Tyler Freeman. CF Angel Martínez roster status changed. |
| October 7 | Activated CF Ángel Martínez. CF Tyler Freeman roster status changed. |
| October 14 | CF Ángel Martínez roster status changed. Activated RHP Pedro Ávila. |
| October 15 | RHP Alex Cobb roster status changed. Activated RHP Ben Lively. |
| October 20 | Activated RHP's Triston McKenzie and Connor Gillispie; CF Ángel Martínez; RF Johnathan Rodríguez; CF Tyler Freeman; RHP Peter Strzelecki; SS Juan Brito; CF Myles Straw; LHP Logan Allen; RHP Nick Sandlin; 3B Gabriel Arias; RF George Valera; RHP Alex Cobb and RHP Daniel Espino. |
| October 31 | C Austin Hedges; RHP Alex Cobb; LHP Matthew Boyd; and RHP Shane Bieber elected free agency. |

==== November 2024 ====
| November 4 | Sent CF Myles Straw; and RHP James Karinchak outright to Columbus Clippers. Activated LHP Sam Hentges; and RHP's Trevor Stephan and James Karinchak from the 60-day IL. |

== Season standings ==
=== American League Central ===
AL Central
| Team | W | L | Pct. | GB | Home | Road |
|---|---|---|---|---|---|---|
| Cleveland Guardians | 88 | 74 | .543 | — | 45‍–‍36 | 43‍–‍38 |
| Detroit Tigers | 87 | 75 | .537 | 1 | 46‍–‍35 | 41‍–‍40 |
| Kansas City Royals | 82 | 80 | .506 | 6 | 43‍–‍38 | 39‍–‍42 |
| Minnesota Twins | 70 | 92 | .432 | 18 | 38‍–‍43 | 32‍–‍49 |
| Chicago White Sox | 60 | 102 | .370 | 28 | 33‍–‍48 | 27‍–‍54 |

=== American League Wild Card ===
Division leaders
| Team | W | L | Pct. |
|---|---|---|---|
| Toronto Blue Jays | 94 | 68 | .580 |
| Seattle Mariners | 90 | 72 | .556 |
| Cleveland Guardians | 88 | 74 | .543 |

Wild Card teams (Top 3 teams qualify for postseason)
| Team | W | L | Pct. | GB |
|---|---|---|---|---|
| New York Yankees | 94 | 68 | .580 | +7 |
| Boston Red Sox | 89 | 73 | .549 | +2 |
| Detroit Tigers | 87 | 75 | .537 | — |
| Houston Astros | 87 | 75 | .537 | — |
| Kansas City Royals | 82 | 80 | .506 | 5 |
| Texas Rangers | 81 | 81 | .500 | 6 |
| Tampa Bay Rays | 77 | 85 | .475 | 10 |
| Athletics | 76 | 86 | .469 | 11 |
| Baltimore Orioles | 75 | 87 | .463 | 12 |
| Los Angeles Angels | 72 | 90 | .444 | 15 |
| Minnesota Twins | 70 | 92 | .432 | 17 |
| Chicago White Sox | 60 | 102 | .370 | 27 |

=== Record vs. opponents ===
==== Record vs. American League ====
2025 American League record Source: MLB Standings Grid – 2025
| Team | ATH | BAL | BOS | CWS | CLE | DET | HOU | KC | LAA | MIN | NYY | SEA | TB | TEX | TOR | NL |
|---|---|---|---|---|---|---|---|---|---|---|---|---|---|---|---|---|
| Athletics | — | 4–2 | 3–3 | 5–1 | 2–4 | 4–2 | 8–5 | 4–2 | 4–9 | 4–3 | 2–4 | 6–7 | 3–3 | 5–8 | 2–5 | 20–28 |
| Baltimore | 2–4 | — | 5–8 | 6–0 | 3–4 | 1–5 | 3–4 | 2–4 | 5–1 | 0–6 | 4–9 | 5–1 | 7–6 | 2–4 | 6–7 | 24–24 |
| Boston | 3–3 | 8–5 | — | 4–3 | 4–2 | 2–4 | 4–2 | 4–2 | 1–5 | 3–3 | 9–4 | 3–3 | 10–3 | 3–4 | 5–8 | 26–22 |
| Chicago | 1–5 | 0–6 | 3–4 | — | 2–11 | 5–8 | 3–3 | 3–10 | 3–3 | 8–5 | 1–6 | 1–5 | 4–2 | 2–4 | 3–3 | 21–27 |
| Cleveland | 4–2 | 4–3 | 2–4 | 11–2 | — | 8–5 | 4–2 | 8–5 | 3–3 | 9–4 | 3–3 | 2–4 | 5–2 | 2–4 | 3–3 | 20–28 |
| Detroit | 2–4 | 5–1 | 4–2 | 8–5 | 5–8 | — | 4–2 | 9–4 | 5–2 | 8–5 | 4–2 | 2–4 | 3–3 | 2–4 | 3–4 | 23–25 |
| Houston | 5–8 | 4–3 | 2–4 | 3–3 | 2–4 | 2–4 | — | 3–3 | 8–5 | 5–1 | 3-3 | 5–8 | 3–4 | 7–6 | 4–2 | 31–17 |
| Kansas City | 2–4 | 4–2 | 2–4 | 10–3 | 5–8 | 4–9 | 3–3 | — | 3–3 | 7–6 | 0–6 | 3–4 | 3–3 | 6-1 | 4–2 | 26–22 |
| Los Angeles | 9–4 | 1–5 | 5–1 | 3–3 | 3–3 | 2–5 | 5–8 | 3–3 | — | 2–4 | 3–4 | 4–9 | 3–3 | 5–8 | 2–4 | 22–26 |
| Minnesota | 3–4 | 6–0 | 3–3 | 5–8 | 4–9 | 5–8 | 1–5 | 6–7 | 4–2 | — | 2–4 | 3–4 | 3–3 | 3–3 | 2–4 | 20–28 |
| New York | 4–2 | 9–4 | 4–9 | 6–1 | 3–3 | 2–4 | 3–3 | 6–0 | 4–3 | 4–2 | — | 5–1 | 9–4 | 4–2 | 5–8 | 26–22 |
| Seattle | 7–6 | 1–5 | 3–3 | 5–1 | 4–2 | 4–2 | 8–5 | 4–3 | 9–4 | 4–3 | 1–5 | — | 3–3 | 10–3 | 2–4 | 25–23 |
| Tampa Bay | 3–3 | 6–7 | 3–10 | 2–4 | 2–5 | 3–3 | 4–3 | 3–3 | 3–3 | 3–3 | 4–9 | 3–3 | — | 3–3 | 7–6 | 28–20 |
| Texas | 8–5 | 4–2 | 4–3 | 4–2 | 4–2 | 4–2 | 6–7 | 1-6 | 8–5 | 3–3 | 2–4 | 3–10 | 3–3 | — | 2–4 | 25–23 |
| Toronto | 5–2 | 7–6 | 8–5 | 3–3 | 3–3 | 4–3 | 2–4 | 2–4 | 4–2 | 4–2 | 8–5 | 4–2 | 6–7 | 4–2 | — | 30–18 |

Updated with the results of all games through September 28, 2025.

==== Record vs. National League ====
2025 American League record vs. National League Source: MLB Standings
| Team | AZ | ATL | CHC | CIN | COL | LAD | MIA | MIL | NYM | PHI | PIT | SD | SF | STL | WSH |
|---|---|---|---|---|---|---|---|---|---|---|---|---|---|---|---|
| Athletics | 1–2 | 2–1 | 0–3 | 3–0 | 2–1 | 1–2 | 2–1 | 1–2 | 1–2 | 1–2 | 1–2 | 1–2 | 1–5 | 1–2 | 2–1 |
| Baltimore | 1–2 | 3–0 | 1–2 | 1–2 | 2–1 | 2–1 | 1–2 | 1–2 | 2–1 | 1–2 | 3–0 | 3–0 | 1–2 | 1–2 | 1–5 |
| Boston | 1–2 | 3–3 | 1–2 | 2–1 | 3–0 | 2–1 | 2–1 | 0–3 | 2–1 | 1–2 | 1–2 | 1–2 | 1–2 | 3–0 | 3–0 |
| Chicago | 1–2 | 1–2 | 1–5 | 2–1 | 2–1 | 0–3 | 2–1 | 1–2 | 1–2 | 2–1 | 3–0 | 1–2 | 2–1 | 0–3 | 2–1 |
| Cleveland | 1–2 | 0–3 | 0–3 | 1–5 | 2–1 | 1–2 | 2–1 | 2–1 | 3–0 | 1–2 | 3–0 | 0–3 | 2–1 | 0–3 | 2–1 |
| Detroit | 3–0 | 0–3 | 2–1 | 1–2 | 3–0 | 0–3 | 1–2 | 1–2 | 1–2 | 1–2 | 2–4 | 2–1 | 3–0 | 2–1 | 1–2 |
| Houston | 3–0 | 2–1 | 2–1 | 2–1 | 4–2 | 3–0 | 2–1 | 1–2 | 2–1 | 3–0 | 2–1 | 2–1 | 0–3 | 1–2 | 2–1 |
| Kansas City | 2–1 | 2–1 | 2–1 | 1–2 | 3–0 | 1–2 | 1–2 | 1–2 | 1–2 | 1–2 | 3–0 | 1–2 | 2–1 | 3–3 | 2–1 |
| Los Angeles | 2–1 | 2–1 | 0–3 | 1–2 | 1–2 | 6–0 | 1–2 | 0–3 | 0–3 | 2–1 | 1–2 | 1–2 | 2–1 | 2–1 | 1–2 |
| Minnesota | 1–2 | 0–3 | 2–1 | 1–2 | 1–2 | 1–2 | 1–2 | 2–4 | 2–1 | 1–2 | 2–1 | 2–1 | 3–0 | 0–3 | 1–2 |
| New York | 1–2 | 2–1 | 1–2 | 1–2 | 2–1 | 1–2 | 0–3 | 3–0 | 3–3 | 1–2 | 2–1 | 2–1 | 1–2 | 3–0 | 3–0 |
| Seattle | 0–3 | 2–1 | 2–1 | 2–1 | 3–0 | 0–3 | 2–1 | 1–2 | 1–2 | 0–3 | 3–0 | 5–1 | 0–3 | 3–0 | 1–2 |
| Tampa Bay | 2–1 | 2–1 | 1–2 | 0–3 | 2–1 | 1–2 | 3–3 | 2–1 | 3–0 | 0–3 | 2–1 | 3–0 | 2–1 | 2–1 | 3–0 |
| Texas | 2–4 | 3–0 | 1–2 | 2–1 | 3–0 | 1–2 | 0–3 | 3–0 | 2–1 | 0–3 | 2–1 | 1–2 | 1–2 | 2–1 | 2–1 |
| Toronto | 2–1 | 2–1 | 2–1 | 2–1 | 3–0 | 1–2 | 2–1 | 1–2 | 0–3 | 2–4 | 1–2 | 3–0 | 3–0 | 3–0 | 3–0 |

Updated with the results of all games through September 28, 2025.

== Roster ==
2025 Cleveland Guardians
Roster
| Pitchers: 49 Kolby Allard; 26 Logan Allen; 28 Tanner Bibee; 58 Cody Bolton; 54 Joey Cantillo; 44 Slade Cecconi; 48 Emmanuel Clase; 59 Nic Enright; 52 Matt Festa; 33 Hunter Gaddis; 29 Tim Herrin; 40 Carlos Hernández; 16 Jakob Junis; 61 Zak Kent; 39 Ben Lively; 24 Triston McKenzie; 77 Parker Messick; 65 Doug Nikhazy; 45 Luis Ortiz; 62 Erik Sabrowski; 34 Paul Sewald; 36 Cade Smith; 91 Andrew Walters; 32 Gavin Williams | Catchers: 27 Austin Hedges; 23 Bo Naylor; 46 Dom Núñez; Infielders: 13 Gabriel Arias; 9 Kyle Manzardo; 11 José Ramírez; 4 Brayan Rocchio; 41 Carlos Santana; 10 Daniel Schneemann; 7 Will Wilson | Outfielders: 17 Will Brennan; 34 Chase DeLauter; 0 Petey Halpin; 22 Nolan Jones; 63 C. J. Kayfus; 38 Steven Kwan; 1 Ángel Martínez; 43 Jhonkensy Noel; 30 Johnathan Rodríguez; 8 Lane Thomas; 35 George Valera; Other batters: 6 David Fry | Manager: 12 Stephen Vogt; Coaches: 55 Craig Albernaz (associate manager); 15 Sandy Alomar Jr. (first base/catching); 85 Junior Betances (assistant hitting); 50 Kai Correa (field coordinator); 56 Grant Fink (hitting); 81 Brad Goldberg (assistant pitching); 88 Caleb Longshore (bullpen); 84 J. T. Maguire (outfield/base running); 53 Rouglas Odor (third base/infield); 82 Ricky Pacione (bullpen catcher); 83 Dan Puente (assistant hitting); 89 Agustin Rivero (coach/interpreter); 72 Eric Rodríguez (bullpen catcher); 86 Joe Torres (assistant pitching); -- Josh Tubbs (hitting analyst); 51 Carl Willis (pitching) |

== Regular season ==
=== Game log ===
2025 Game Log: 88–74 (Home: 45–36; Away: 43–38)
March/April: 17–13 (Home: 10–5; Away: 7–8)

| # | Date | Opponent | Score | Win | Loss | Save | Attendance | Record | Streak |
|---|---|---|---|---|---|---|---|---|---|
| 1 | March 27 | @ Royals | 7–4 (10) | **Clase** (1–0) | Long (0–1) | **Sewald** (1) | 39,393 | 1–0 | W1 |
| 2 | March 29 | @ Royals | 3–4 | Lynch IV (1–0) | **Sewald** (0–1) | Estévez (1) | 22,015 | 1–1 | L1 |
| 3 | March 30 | @ Royals | 6–2 | **Bibee** (1–0) | Wacha (0–1) | — | 15,414 | 2–1 | W1 |
| 4 | March 31 | @ Padres | 2–7 | Hart (1–0) | **Ortiz** (0–1) | — | 43,404 | 2–2 | L1 |
| 5 | April 1 | @ Padres | 0–7 | King (1–0) | **Allen** (0–1) | — | 37,120 | 2–3 | L2 |
| 6 | April 2 | @ Padres | 2–5 | Cease (1–0) | **Lively** (0–1) | Suárez (3) | 35,858 | 2–4 | L3 |
| 7 | April 4 | @ Angels | 8–6 | **Herrin** (1–0) | Soriano (0–1) | — | 44,749 | 3–4 | W1 |
| 8 | April 5 | @ Angels | 4–10 | Kochanowicz (1–0) | **Bibee** (1–1) | — | 41,128 | 3–5 | L1 |
| 9 | April 6 | @ Angels | 2–6 | Zeferjahn (1–0) | **Ortiz** (0–2) | — | 41,483 | 3–6 | L2 |
| 10 | April 8 | White Sox | 1–0 | **Clase** (2–0) | Clevinger (0–2) | — | 33,722 | 4–6 | W1 |
| 11 | April 9 | White Sox | 3–2 | **Sewald** (1–1) | Burke (1–2) | **Clase** (1) | 12,997 | 5–6 | W2 |
| 12 | April 10 | White Sox | 6–1 | **Williams** (1–0) | Cannon (0–2) | — | 12,663 | 6–6 | W3 |
| 13 | April 11 | Royals | 7–0 | **Herrin** (2–0) | Bubic (2–1) | — | 15,430 | 7–6 | W4 |
| 14 | April 12 | Royals | 6–3 | **Ortiz** (1–2) | Lorenzen (1–2) | — | 20,256 | 8–6 | W5 |
| 15 | April 13 | Royals | 2–4 | Ragans (1–0) | **Lively** (0–2) | Estévez (5) | 17,864 | 8–7 | L1 |
| 16 | April 15 | @ Orioles | 6–3 | **Allen** (1–1) | Morton (0–4) | **Clase** (2) | 14,203 | 9–7 | W1 |
| 17 | April 16 | @ Orioles | 1–9 | Kremer (2–2) | **Williams** (1–1) | — | 13,964 | 9–8 | L1 |
| 18 | April 17 | @ Orioles | 2–6 | Sugano (2–1) | **Bibee** (1–2) | — | 16,201 | 9–9 | L2 |
| 19 | April 18 | @ Pirates | 10–7 | **Ortiz** (2–2) | Mlodzinski (1–3) | **Clase** (3) | 27,900 | 10–9 | W1 |
| 20 | April 19 | @ Pirates | 3–0 | **Lively** (1–2) | Skenes (2–2) | **Clase** (4) | 37,713 | 11–9 | W2 |
| 21 | April 20 | @ Pirates | 5–4 (10) | **Clase** (3–0) | Santana (0–1) | **Cantillo** (1) | 12,433 | 12–9 | W3 |
| 22 | April 21 | Yankees | 6–4 | **Williams** (2–1) | Schmidt (0–1) | **Smith** (1) | 20,896 | 13–9 | W4 |
| 23 | April 22 | Yankees | 3–2 | **Bibee** (2–1) | Leiter Jr. (2–2) | **Smith** (2) | 21,549 | 14–9 | W5 |
| 24 | April 23 | Yankees | 1–5 | Rodón (3–3) | **Ortiz** (2–3) | — | 23,981 | 14–10 | L1 |
| ― | April 25 | Red Sox | Postponed (rain); Makeup: April 26 | | | | | | |
| 25 | April 26 (1) | Red Sox | 5–4 | **Herrin** (3–0) | Bernardino (1–1) | **Smith** (3) | 17,367 | 15–10 | W1 |
| 26 | April 26 (2) | Red Sox | 3–7 | Buehler (4–1) | **Nikhazy** (0–1) | — | 24,316 | 15–11 | L1 |
| 27 | April 27 | Red Sox | 3–13 | Bello (2–0) | **Allen** (1–2) | — | 24,621 | 15–12 | L2 |
| 28 | April 28 | Twins | 1–11 | Ober (3–1) | **Williams** (2–2) | — | 15,018 | 15–13 | L3 |
| 29 | April 29 | Twins | 2–1 | **Clase** (4–0) | Varland (1–2) | — | 14,312 | 16–13 | W1 |
| 30 | April 30 | Twins | 4–2 | **Smith** (1–0) | López (2–2) | **Clase** (5) | 15,523 | 17–13 | W2 |

May: 14–13 (Home: 6–6; Away: 8–7)

| # | Date | Opponent | Score | Win | Loss | Save | Attendance | Record | Streak |
|---|---|---|---|---|---|---|---|---|---|
| 31 | May 1 | Twins | 4–3 (10) | **Allard** (1–0) | Topa (1–2) | — | 15,968 | 18–13 | W3 |
| 32 | May 2 | @ Blue Jays | 3–5 | Little (1–0) | **Junis** (0–1) | Hoffman (7) | 26,087 | 18–14 | L1 |
| 33 | May 3 | @ Blue Jays | 5–3 | **Allard** (2–0) | García (0–1) | **Clase** (6) | 40,507 | 19-14 | W1 |
| 34 | May 4 | @ Blue Jays | 5–4 | **Bibee** (3–2) | Francis (2–5) | **Clase** (7) | 30,641 | 20–14 | W2 |
| ― | May 5 | @ Nationals | Postponed (rain); Makeup: May 6 | | | | | | |
| 35 | May 6 (1) | @ Nationals | 9–10 | López (5–0) | **Smith** (1–1) | Finnegan (12) | see 2nd game | 20–15 | L1 |
| 36 | May 6 (2) | @ Nationals | 9–1 | **Lively** (2–2) | Lord (1–4) | — | 21,948 | 21–15 | W1 |
| 37 | May 7 | @ Nationals | 8–6 | **Cantillo** (1–0) | Soroka (0–2) | **Clase** (8) | 19,896 | 22–15 | W2 |
| 38 | May 9 | Phillies | 6–0 | **Williams** (3–2) | Nola (1–6) | — | 25,328 | 23–15 | W3 |
| 39 | May 10 | Phillies | 1–7 | Suárez (1–0) | **Bibee** (3–3) | — | 34,782 | 23–16 | L1 |
| 40 | May 11 | Phillies | 0–3 | Wheeler (4–1) | **Ortiz** (2–4) | Romano (3) | 20,304 | 23–17 | L2 |
| 41 | May 12 | Brewers | 5–0 | **Junis** (1–1) | Peralta (4–3) | — | 17,359 | 24–17 | W1 |
| 42 | May 13 | Brewers | 2–0 | **Allen** (2–2) | Priester (1–2) | **Clase** (9) | 16,153 | 25–17 | W2 |
| 43 | May 14 | Brewers | 5–9 | Henderson (2–0) | **Herrin** (3–1) | — | 25,063 | 25–18 | L1 |
| 44 | May 16 | @ Reds | 4–5 | Singer (5–2) | **Bibee** (4–5) | Pagán (10) | 26,131 | 25–19 | L2 |
| 45 | May 17 | @ Reds | 1–4 | Mey (1–0) | **Cecconi** (0–1) | Pagán (11) | 38,586 | 25–20 | L3 |
| 46 | May 18 | @ Reds | 1–3 | Abbott (3–0) | **Ortiz** (2–5) | Pagán (12) | 27,628 | 25–21 | L4 |
| 47 | May 19 | @ Twins | 5–6 (Note: The May 19 game was suspended due to rain in the top of the fourth inning with the Twins leading 2–1; it was completed before the regularly scheduled game on May 21) | Durán (2–0) | **Smith** (1–2) | — | see 2nd game | 25–22 | L5 |
| ― | May 20 | @ Twins | Postponed (rain); Makeup: Sept 20 | | | | | | |
| 48 | May 21 | @ Twins | 5–1 | **Williams** (4–2) | Paddack (2–4) | — | 26,142 | 26–22 | W1 |
| 49 | May 22 | @ Tigers | 7–0 | **Bibee** (4–4) | Flaherty (2–6) | — | 21,937 | 27–22 | W2 |
| 50 | May 23 | @ Tigers | 3–1 | **Cecconi** (1–1) | Jobe (4–1) | **Clase** (10) | 26,701 | 28–22 | W3 |
| 51 | May 24 | @ Tigers | 7–5 (10) | **Herrin** (4–1) | Hanifee (2–2) | — | 37,256 | 29–22 | W4 |
| 52 | May 25 | @ Tigers | 0–5 | Skubal (5–2) | **Allen** (2–3) | — | 37,031 | 29–23 | L1 |
| 53 | May 26 | Dodgers | 2–7 | Yamamoto (6–3) | **Williams** (4–3) | — | 34,711 | 29–24 | L2 |
| 54 | May 27 | Dodgers | 5–9 | May (3–4) | **Bibee** (4–5) | — | 25,422 | 29–25 | L3 |
| 55 | May 28 | Dodgers | 7–4 | **Festa** (1–0) | Scott (0–1) | **Clase** (11) | 23,381 | 30–25 | W1 |
| 56 | May 30 | Angels | 1–4 | Soriano (4–3) | **Ortiz** (2–6) | — | 31,407 | 30–26 | L1 |
| 57 | May 31 | Angels | 7–5 | **Allen** (3–3) | Zeferjahn (2–1) | **Clase** (12) | 28,184 | 31–26 | W1 |

June: 9–16 (Home: 4–9; Away: 5–7)

| # | Date | Opponent | Score | Win | Loss | Save | Attendance | Record | Streak |
|---|---|---|---|---|---|---|---|---|---|
| 58 | June 1 | Angels | 4–2 | **Williams** (5–3) | Kochanowicz (3–7) | **Clase** (13) | 26,518 | 32–26 | W2 |
| 59 | June 3 | @ Yankees | 2–3 | Rodón (8–3) | **Bibee** (4–6) | Williams (6) | 40,683 | 32–27 | L1 |
| 60 | June 4 | @ Yankees | 4–0 | **Ortiz** (3–6) | Schmidt (2–3) | — | 36,759 | 33–27 | W1 |
| 61 | June 5 | @ Yankees | 0–4 | Fried (8–1) | **Cecconi** (1–2) | — | 41,665 | 33–28 | L1 |
| 62 | June 6 | Astros | 2–4 | Gordon (1–1) | **Allen** (3–4) | Hader (17) | 31,819 | 33–29 | L2 |
| 63 | June 7 | Astros | 3-5 (10) | Hader (2–0) | **Gaddis** (0–1) | Sousa (1) | 31,717 | 33–30 | L3 |
| 64 | June 8 | Astros | 4–2 | **Smith** (2–2) | Okert (1–2) | **Clase** (14) | 23,876 | 34–30 | W1 |
| 65 | June 9 | Reds | 4–7 | Miley (1–0) | **Ortiz** (3–7) | Pagán (16) | 23,436 | 34–31 | L1 |
| 66 | June 10 | Reds | 0–1 | Abbott (6–1) | **Cecconi** (1–3) | — | 26,753 | 34–32 | L2 |
| 67 | June 11 | Reds | 11–2 | **Allen** (4–4) | Lodolo (4–5) | — | 28,564 | 35–32 | W1 |
| 68 | June 13 | @ Mariners | 2–7 | Vargas (2–5) | **Herrin** (4–2) | — | 34,378 | 35–33 | L1 |
| 69 | June 14 | @ Mariners | 3–4 | Kowar (1–0) | **Clase** (4–1) | — | 32,211 | 35–34 | L2 |
| 70 | June 15 | @ Mariners | 0–6 | Hancock (3–2) | **Ortiz** (3–8) | — | 40,871 | 35–35 | L3 |
| 71 | June 17 | @ Giants | 3–2 | **Cecconi** (2–3) | Ray (8–2) | **Clase** (15) | 36,222 | 36–35 | W1 |
| 72 | June 18 | @ Giants | 4–2 | **Allen** (5–4) | Verlander (0–4) | **Clase** (16) | 34,055 | 37–35 | W2 |
| 73 | June 19 | @ Giants | 1–2 | Webb (7–5) | **Festa** (1–1) | Doval (11) | 40,093 | 37–36 | L1 |
| 74 | June 20 | @ Athletics | 1–5 | Springs (6–5) | **Bibee** (4–7) | — | 8,578 | 37–37 | L2 |
| 75 | June 21 | @ Athletics | 4–2 | **Ortiz** (4–8) | Spence (2–2) | **Clase** (17) | 8,383 | 38–37 | W1 |
| 76 | June 22 | @ Athletics | 3–0 | **Cecconi** (3–3) | Sears (5–7) | **Clase** (18) | 10,215 | 39–37 | W2 |
| 77 | June 24 | Blue Jays | 6–10 | Lauer (4–1) | **Allen** (5–5) | — | 22,525 | 39–38 | L1 |
| 78 | June 25 | Blue Jays | 5–4 (10) | **Enright** (1–0) | Fluharty (3–2) | — | 23,849 | 40–38 | W1 |
| 79 | June 26 | Blue Jays | 0–6 | Gausman (6–6) | **Bibee** (4–8) | — | 26,217 | 40–39 | L1 |
| 80 | June 27 | Cardinals | 0–5 | Gray (8–2) | **Ortiz** (4–9) | — | 34,787 | 40–40 | L2 |
| 81 | June 28 | Cardinals | 6-8 | Svanson (1–0) | **Festa** (1–2) | Helsley (16) | 32,484 | 40–41 | L3 |
| 82 | June 29 | Cardinals | 0–7 | Liberatore (6–6) | **Allen** (5–6) | — | 27,935 | 40–42 | L4 |

July: 14–12 (Home: 7–6; Away: 7–6)

| # | Date | Opponent | Score | Win | Loss | Save | Attendance | Record | Streak |
|---|---|---|---|---|---|---|---|---|---|
| 83 | July 1 | @ Cubs | 2–5 | Boyd (8–3) | **Williams** (5–4) | Palencia (9) | 38,257 | 40–43 | L5 |
| 84 | July 2 | @ Cubs | 4–5 | Imanaga (5–2) | **Bibee** (4–9) | Palencia (10) | 35,250 | 40–44 | L6 |
| 85 | July 3 | @ Cubs | 0–1 (10) | Flexen (5–0) | **Clase** (4–2) | — | 38,450 | 40–45 | L7 |
| 86 | July 4 | Tigers | 1–2 | Holton (4–3) | **Cecconi** (3–4) | Vest (14) | 38,213 | 40–46 | L8 |
| 87 | July 5 | Tigers | 0–1 | Mize (9–2) | **Allen** (5–7) | Kahnle (9) | 34,580 | 40–47 | L9 |
| 88 | July 6 | Tigers | 2–7 (10) | Lee (4–0) | **Smith** (2–3) | — | 30,953 | 40–48 | L10 |
| 89 | July 7 | @ Astros | 7–5 | **Festa** (2–2) | Gordon (3–2) | **Clase** (19) | 27,472 | 41–48 | W1 |
| 90 | July 8 | @ Astros | 10–6 (10) | **Junis** (2–1) | Hader (5–2) | — | 30,681 | 42–48 | W2 |
| 91 | July 9 | @ Astros | 4–2 | **Cecconi** (4–4) | Walter (1–2) | **Sewald** (2) | 27,683 | 43–48 | W3 |
| ― | July 10 | @ White Sox | Postponed (rain); Makeup: July 11 | | | | | | |
| 92 | July 11 (1) | @ White Sox | 4–2 | **Allen** (6–7) | Alexander (4–9) | **Clase** (20) | 12,869 | 44–48 | W4 |
| 93 | July 11 (2) | @ White Sox | 4–5 (11) | Vasil (4–3) | **Allard** (2–1) | — | 25,084 | 44–49 | L1 |
| 94 | July 12 | @ White Sox | 6–2 | **Bibee** (5–9) | Leasure (2–5) | — | 21,785 | 45–49 | W1 |
| 95 | July 13 | @ White Sox | 6–5 (10) | **Clase** (5–2) | Eisert (2–2) | — | 24,680 | 46–49 | W2 |
**95th All-Star Game: Cumberland, GA**
| 96 | July 18 | Athletics | 8–6 | **Cecconi** (5–4) | Sears (7–8) | **Clase** (21) | 34,691 | 47–49 | W3 |
| 97 | July 19 | Athletics | 2–8 | Severino (3–11) | **Allen** (6–8) | — | 32,949 | 47–50 | L1 |
| 98 | July 20 | Athletics | 8–2 | **Williams** (6–4) | Springs (8–7) | — | 25,855 | 48–50 | W1 |
| 99 | July 21 | Orioles | 10–5 | **Bibee** (6–9) | Selby (0–1) | — | 21,748 | 49–50 | W2 |
| 100 | July 22 | Orioles | 6–3 | **Cantillo** (2–0) | Young (0–5) | **Clase** (22) | 22,714 | 50–50 | W3 |
| 101 | July 23 | Orioles | 3–2 | **Gaddis** (1–1) | Selby (0–2) | **Clase** (23) | 30,476 | 51–50 | W4 |
| 102 | July 24 | Orioles | 3–4 | Morton (6–8) | **Allen** (6–9) | Soto (1) | 26,223 | 51–51 | L1 |
| ― | July 25 | @ Royals | Postponed (rain); Makeup: July 26 | | | | | | |
| 103 | July 26 (1) | @ Royals | 3–5 (10) | Cruz (3–1) | **Clase** (5–3) | — | 21,801 | 51–52 | L2 |
| 104 | July 26 (2) | @ Royals | 6–4 | **Bibee** (7–9) | Bubic (8–7) | **Clase** (24) | 25,278 | 52–52 | W1 |
| 105 | July 27 | @ Royals | 1–4 | Cameron (5–4) | **Cantillo** (2–1) | Estévez (27) | 16,590 | 52–53 | L1 |
| 106 | July 28 | Rockies | 6–8 | Kinley (1–3) | **Smith** (2–4) | Halvorsen (11) | 19,130 | 52–54 | L2 |
| 107 | July 29 | Rockies | 10–4 | **Allen** (7–9) | Gordon (2–3) | — | 19,803 | 53–54 | W1 |
| 108 | July 30 | Rockies | 5–0 | **Junis** (3–1) | Freeland (2–11) | — | 21,560 | 54–54 | W2 |

August: 14–13 (Home: 8–7; Away: 6–6)

| # | Date | Opponent | Score | Win | Loss | Save | Attendance | Record | Streak |
|---|---|---|---|---|---|---|---|---|---|
| 109 | August 1 | Twins | 3–2 (10) | **Smith** (3–4) | Funderburk (1–1) | — | 32,777 | 55–54 | W3 |
| 110 | August 2 | Twins | 5–4 | **Enright** (2–0) | Ohl (0–2) | **Gaddis** (1) | 35,116 | 56–54 | W4 |
| 111 | August 3 | Twins | 4–5 | Funderburk (2–1) | **Cantillo** (2–2) | Ramírez (1) | 29,240 | 56–55 | L1 |
| 112 | August 4 | @ Mets | 7–6 (10) | **Smith** (4–4) | Helsley (3–2) | **Enright** (1) | 37,886 | 57–55 | W1 |
| 113 | August 5 | @ Mets | 3–2 | **Festa** (3–2) | Rogers (4–4) | **Smith** (4) | 39,895 | 58–55 | W2 |
| 114 | August 6 | @ Mets | 4–1 | **Williams** (7–4) | Peterson (7–5) | **Gaddis** (2) | 40,072 | 59–55 | W3 |
| 115 | August 8 | @ White Sox | 9–5 | **Bibee** (8–9) | Civale (3–7) | — | 21,007 | 60–55 | W4 |
| 116 | August 9 | @ White Sox | 3–1 | **Cantillo** (3–2) | Burke (4–9) | **Smith** (5) | 17,893 | 61–55 | W5 |
| 117 | August 10 | @ White Sox | 4–6 | Martin (4–9) | **Cecconi** (5–5) | Taylor (4) | 19,750 | 61–56 | L1 |
| 118 | August 12 | Marlins | 4–3 | **Smith** (5–4) | Faucher (3–3) | — | 21,874 | 62–56 | W1 |
| 119 | August 13 | Marlins | 4–13 | Pérez (5–3) | **Allard** (2–2) | ― | 19,738 | 62–57 | L1 |
| 120 | August 14 | Marlins | 9–4 | **Bibee** (9–9) | Cabrera (6–6) | **Smith** (6) | 22,605 | 63–57 | W1 |
| 121 | August 15 | Braves | 0–2 | Waldrep (3–0) | **Cantillo** (3–3) | Iglesias (18) | 33,571 | 63–58 | L1 |
| 122 | August 16 | Braves | 1–10 | Wentz (4–3) | **Cecconi** (5–6) | Stratton (1) | 34,059 | 63–59 | L2 |
| 123 | August 17 | Braves | 4–5 | Bummer (3–2) | **Enright** (2–1) | Iglesias (19) | 28,899 | 63–60 | L3 |
| 124 | August 18 | @ Diamondbacks | 3–1 | **Williams** (8–4) | Gallen (9–13) | **Smith** (7) | 16,815 | 64–60 | W1 |
| 125 | August 19 | @ Diamondbacks | 5–6 | Burgos (1–0) | **Herrin** (4–3) | Saalfrank (2) | 19,723 | 64–61 | L1 |
| 126 | August 20 | @ Diamondbacks | 2–3 (10) | Saalfrank (1–1) | **Festa** (3–3) | — | 16,848 | 64–62 | L2 |
| 127 | August 22 | @ Rangers | 3–4 | Garcia (2–7) | **Smith** (5–5) | — | 26,729 | 64–63 | L3 |
| 128 | August 23 | @ Rangers | 0–10 | Leiter (8–7) | **Allen** (7–10) | — | 37,006 | 64–64 | L4 |
| 129 | August 24 | @ Rangers | 0–5 | Kelly (10–7) | **Williams** (8–5) | — | 34,577 | 64–65 | L5 |
| 130 | August 25 | Rays | 0–9 | Seymour (2–0) | **Bibee** (9–10) | — | 16,325 | 64–66 | L6 |
| 131 | August 26 | Rays | 3–0 | **Messick** (1–0) | Baz (8–11) | **Smith** (8) | 19,729 | 65–66 | W1 |
| 132 | August 27 | Rays | 4–3 (10) | **Smith** (6–5) | Jax (1–7) | — | 23,316 | 66–66 | W2 |
| 133 | August 29 | Mariners | 5–4 | **Herrin** (5–3) | Muñoz (3–2) | — | 32,012 | 67–66 | W3 |
| 134 | August 30 | Mariners | 4–3 | **Williams** (9–5) | Gilbert (4–6) | **Smith** (9) | 33,203 | 68–66 | W4 |
| 135 | August 31 | Mariners | 2–4 | Miller (4–5) | **Bibee** (9–11) | Muñoz (32) | 34,136 | 68–67 | L1 |

September: 20–7 (Home: 10–3; Away: 10–4)

| # | Date | Opponent | Score | Win | Loss | Save | Attendance | Record | Streak |
|---|---|---|---|---|---|---|---|---|---|
| 136 | September 1 | @ Red Sox | 4–6 | Bello (11–6) | **Sabrowski** (0–1) | Chapman (28) | 36,021 | 68–68 | L2 |
| 137 | September 2 | @ Red Sox | 7–11 | Slaten (2–4) | **Gaddis** (1–2) | — | 34,902 | 68–69 | L3 |
| 138 | September 3 | @ Red Sox | 8–1 | **Cantillo** (4–3) | Bernardino (4–3) | — | 36,658 | 69–69 | W1 |
| 139 | September 4 | @ Rays | 2–4 | Pepiot (11–10) | **Allen** (7–11) | — | 8,306 | 69–70 | L1 |
| 140 | September 5 | @ Rays | 7–1 | **Williams** (10–5) | Seymour (3–1) | — | 8,836 | 70–70 | W1 |
| 141 | September 6 | @ Rays | 3–2 | **Gaddis** (2–2) | Fairbanks (4–5) | **Smith** (10) | 10,046 | 71–70 | W2 |
| 142 | September 7 | @ Rays | 2–1 | **Messick** (2–0) | Cleavinger (1–5) | **Smith** (11) | 8,155 | 72–70 | W3 |
| 143 | September 8 | Royals | 10–2 | **Cecconi** (6–6) | Bergert (2–2) | — | 15,875 | 73–70 | W4 |
| 144 | September 9 | Royals | 2–0 | **Cantillo** (5–3) | Cameron (7–7) | **Smith** (12) | 15,458 | 74–70 | W5 |
| 145 | September 10 | Royals | 3–4 | Avila (1–0) | **Herrin** (5–4) | Estévez (39) | 16,816 | 74–71 | L1 |
| 146 | September 11 | Royals | 3–2 | **Festa** (4–3) | Schreiber (3–3) | **Smith** (13) | 15,962 | 75–71 | W1 |
| 147 | September 12 | White Sox | 4–0 | **Bibee** (10–11) | Pérez (1–5) | — | 21,779 | 76–71 | W2 |
| 148 | September 13 | White Sox | 3–1 | **Messick** (3–0) | Martin (6–10) | **Smith** (14) | 28,643 | 77–71 | W3 |
| 149 | September 14 | White Sox | 3–2 | **Festa** (5–3) | Eisert (3–6) | **Smith** (15) | 22,320 | 78–71 | W4 |
| 150 | September 16 | @ Tigers | 7–5 (10) | **Smith** (7–5) | Vest (6–4) | — | 31,639 | 79–71 | W5 |
| 151 | September 17 | @ Tigers | 4–0 | **Williams** (11–5) | Flaherty (8–14) | — | 34,415 | 80–71 | W6 |
| 152 | September 18 | @ Tigers | 3–1 | **Bibee** (11–11) | Melton (3–2) | **Gaddis** (3) | 34,267 | 81–71 | W7 |
| 153 | September 19 | @ Twins | 6–2 | **Junis** (4–1) | Sands (4–6) | — | 20,159 | 82–71 | W8 |
| 154 | September 20 (1) | @ Twins | 6–0 | **Cecconi** (7–6) | Ryan (13–9) | — | 22,160 | 83–71 | W9 |
| 155 | September 20 (2) | @ Twins | 8–0 | **Allen** (8–11) | Ober (5–9) | — | 23,242 | 84–71 | W10 |
| 156 | September 21 | @ Twins | 2–6 | Funderburk (4–1) | **Festa** (5–4) | — | 22,526 | 84–72 | L1 |
| 157 | September 23 | Tigers | 5–2 | **Williams** (12–5) | Skubal (13–6) | **Smith** (16) | 29,571 | 85–72 | W1 |
| 158 | September 24 | Tigers | 5–1 | **Bibee** (12–11) | Flaherty (8–15) | — | 26,293 | 86–72 | W2 |
| 159 | September 25 | Tigers | 2–4 | Hurter (4–3) | **Messick** (3–1) | Vest (22) | 30,942 | 86–73 | L1 |
| 160 | September 26 | Rangers | 3–7 | Leiter (10–10) | **Cecconi** (7–7) | — | 36,275 | 86–74 | L2 |
| 161 | September 27 | Rangers | 3–2 | **Smith** (8–5) | Garcia (4–8) | — | 36,000 | 87–74 | W1 |
| 162 | September 28 | Rangers | 9–8 (10) | **Kent** (1–0) | Corniell (0–1) | — | 31,054 | 88–74 | W2 |

Legend: = Win = Loss = Clinched playoff spot = Clinched division = Postponement
Bold = Guardians team member

== Postseason ==
=== Game log ===
2025 Postseason Game Log: 1–2 (Home: 1–2; Away: 0–0)
American League Wild Card Series: 1–2 (Home: 1–2; Away: 0–0)

| # | Date | Opponent | Score | Win | Loss | Save | Attendance | Series |
|---|---|---|---|---|---|---|---|---|
| 1 | September 30 | Tigers | 1–2 | Skubal (1–0) | Williams (0–1) | Vest (1) | 26,186 | 0–1 |
| 2 | October 1 | Tigers | 6–1 | Smith (1–0) | Melton (0–1) | — | 26,669 | 1–1 |
| 3 | October 2 | Tigers | 3–6 | Finnegan (1–0) | Cantillo (0–1) | — | 29,891 | 1–2 |

=== Postseason rosters ===
Playoff rosters
American League Wild Card Series

- Pitchers: 16 Jakob Junis 28 Tanner Bibee 29 Tim Herrin 32 Gavin Williams 33 Hunter Gaddis 36 Cade Smith 44 Slade Cecconi 49 Kolby Allard 52 Matt Festa 54 Joey Cantillo 62 Erik Sabrowski
- Catchers: 23 Bo Naylor 27 Austin Hedges
- Infielders: 1 Ángel Martínez 4 Brayan Rocchio 9 Kyle Manzardo 10 Daniel Schneemann 11 José Ramírez 13 Gabriel Arias
- Outfielders: 0 Petey Halpin 30 Johnathan Rodríguez 34 Chase DeLauter 35 George Valera 38 Steven Kwan 43 Jhonkensy Noel 63 C. J. Kayfus

== Player stats ==
Note: Team leaders in each category are in bold.

- Indicates league leader.

=== Batting ===
Note: G = Games played; AB = At bats; R = Runs scored; H = Hits; 2B = Doubles; 3B = Triples; HR = Home runs; RBI = Runs batted in; BB = Walks; AVG = Batting average; SB = Stolen bases

| Player | G | AB | R | H | 2B | 3B | HR | RBI | BB | AVG | SB |
|---|---|---|---|---|---|---|---|---|---|---|---|
| Gabriel Arias | 129 | 432 | 44 | 95 | 25 | 2 | 11 | 53 | 27 | .220 | 8 |
| Will Brennan | 6 | 11 | 0 | 1 | 0 | 0 | 0 | 0 | 1 | .091 | 0 |
| Emmanuel Clase | 1 | 0 | 0 | 0 | 0 | 0 | 0 | 0 | — | — | 0 |
| Matt Festa | 1 | 0 | 0 | 0 | 0 | 0 | 0 | 0 | — | — | 0 |
| David Fry | 66 | 146 | 16 | 25 | 4 | 0 | 8 | 23 | 9 | .171 | 1 |
| Petey Halpin | 6 | 6 | 5 | 2 | 0 | 0 | 0 | 0 | 2 | .333 | 0 |
| Austin Hedges | 68 | 155 | 13 | 25 | 3 | 0 | 5 | 10 | 18 | .161 | 1 |
| Tim Herrin | 1 | 0 | 0 | 0 | 0 | 0 | 0 | 0 | — | — | 0 |
| Nolan Jones | 136 | 355 | 33 | 75 | 14 | 2 | 5 | 34 | 39 | .211 | 8 |
| C. J. Kayfus | 44 | 123 | 15 | 27 | 10 | 1 | 4 | 19 | 11 | .220 | 4 |
| Steven Kwan | **156** | **625** | 80 | **170** | 29 | 1 | 11 | 56 | 55 | .272 | 21 |
| Kyle Manzardo | 142 | 470 | 47 | 110 | 19 | 2 | 27 | 69 | 48 | .234 | 2 |
| Ángel Martínez | 139 | 447 | 56 | 100 | 23 | 2 | 11 | 44 | 23 | .224 | 8 |
| Bo Naylor | 123 | 359 | 46 | 70 | 22 | 1 | 14 | 47 | 45 | .195 | 1 |
| Jhonkensy Noel | 69 | 148 | 19 | 24 | 2 | 0 | 6 | 13 | 4 | .162 | 0 |
| Dom Nuñez | 2 | 7 | 2 | 2 | 0 | 0 | 0 | 0 | 0 | .286 | 0 |
| José Ramírez | 158 | 593 | **103** | 168 | **34** | **3** | **30** | **85** | **66** | **.283** | **44** |
| Brayan Rocchio | 115 | 344 | 34 | 80 | 18 | 2 | 5 | 44 | 22 | .233 | 8 |
| Johnathan Rodríguez | 31 | 71 | 6 | 14 | 4 | 1 | 2 | 10 | 6 | .197 | 1 |
| Carlos Santana | 116 | 396 | 49 | 89 | 9 | 0 | 11 | 51 | 52 | .225 | 7 |
| Daniel Schneemann | 131 | 379 | 48 | 78 | 18 | 1 | 12 | 41 | 38 | .206 | 9 |
| Lane Thomas | 39 | 125 | 10 | 20 | 2 | 0 | 4 | 11 | 14 | .160 | 4 |
| George Valera | 16 | 41 | 7 | 9 | 2 | 0 | 2 | 5 | 7 | .220 | 0 |
| Will Wilson | 34 | 78 | 7 | 15 | 4 | 0 | 0 | 2 | 7 | .192 | 2 |
| **Totals** | **162** | **5310** | **643** | **1198** | **240** | **17** | **164** | **620** | **494** | **.226** | **129** |

=== Pitching ===
Note: W = Wins; L = Losses; ERA = Earned run average; G = Games pitched; GS = Games started; SV = Saves; IP = Innings pitched; H = Hits allowed; R = Runs allowed; ER = Earned runs allowed; BB = Walks allowed; K = Strikeouts

| Player | W | L | ERA | G | GS | SV | IP | H | R | ER | BB | K |
|---|---|---|---|---|---|---|---|---|---|---|---|---|
| Kolby Allard | 2 | 2 | 2.63 | 33 | 2 | 0 | 65.0 | 64 | 22 | 19 | 14 | 42 |
| Logan Allen | 8 | **11** | 4.25 | 30 | 29 | 0 | 156.1 | 157 | 84 | 75 | 62 | 122 |
| Tanner Bibee | **12** | **11** | 4.24 | 31 | **31** | 0 | **182.1** | **170** | **93** | **86** | 54 | 162 |
| Cody Bolton | 0 | 0 | 13.50 | 1 | 0 | 0 | 2.0 | 4 | 3 | 3 | 0 | 1 |
| Joey Cantillo | 5 | 3 | 3.21 | 34 | 13 | 1 | 95.0 | 78 | 39 | 34 | 42 | 108 |
| Slade Cecconi | 7 | 7 | 4.30 | 23 | 23 | 0 | 132.0 | 125 | 66 | 63 | 32 | 109 |
| Emmanuel Clase | 5 | 3 | 3.23 | 48 | 0 | **24** | 47.1 | 46 | 20 | 17 | 12 | 47 |
| Nic Enright | 2 | 1 | 2.03 | 27 | 0 | 1 | 31.0 | 24 | 8 | 7 | 12 | 30 |
| Matt Festa | 5 | 4 | 4.12 | 63 | 0 | 0 | 54.2 | 44 | 29 | 25 | 15 | 56 |
| Hunter Gaddis | 2 | 2 | 3.11 | 73 | 0 | 3 | 66.2 | 58 | 24 | 23 | 21 | 73 |
| Austin Hedges | 0 | 0 | 6.00 | 3 | 0 | 0 | 3.0 | 6 | 2 | 2 | 1 | 1 |
| Carlos Hernández | 0 | 0 | 3.86 | 5 | 0 | 0 | 7.0 | 4 | 3 | 3 | 3 | 3 |
| Tim Herrin | 5 | 4 | 4.85 | 54 | 0 | 0 | 42.2 | 37 | 23 | 23 | 30 | 45 |
| Jakob Junis | 4 | 1 | 2.97 | 57 | 0 | 0 | 66.2 | 64 | 24 | 22 | 18 | 55 |
| Zak Kent | 1 | 0 | 4.58 | 12 | 0 | 0 | 17.2 | 17 | 10 | 9 | 8 | 17 |
| Ben Lively | 2 | 2 | 3.22 | 9 | 9 | 0 | 44.2 | 38 | 16 | 16 | 15 | 29 |
| Triston McKenzie | 0 | 0 | 11.12 | 4 | 0 | 0 | 5.2 | 7 | 7 | 7 | 7 | 4 |
| Parker Messick | 3 | 1 | 2.72 | 7 | 7 | 0 | 39.2 | 46 | 12 | 12 | 6 | 38 |
| Doug Nikhazy | 0 | 1 | 13.50 | 2 | 1 | 0 | 4.0 | 5 | 6 | 6 | 6 | 5 |
| Luis Ortiz | 4 | 9 | 4.36 | 16 | 16 | 0 | 88.2 | 80 | 44 | 43 | 42 | 96 |
| Erik Sabrowski | 0 | 1 | 1.84 | 33 | 0 | 0 | 30.1 | 14 | 8 | 6 | 21 | 42 |
| Paul Sewald | 1 | 1 | 4.70 | 18 | 0 | 2 | 15.1 | 14 | 9 | 8 | 4 | 18 |
| Cade Smith | 8 | 5 | 2.92 | **76** | 55 | 0 | 16 | 73.2 | 31 | 24 | 19 | 104 |
| Andrew Walters | 0 | 0 | 13.50 | 2 | 0 | 0 | 1.1 | 2 | 2 | 2 | 0 | 2 |
| Gavin Williams | 12 | 5 | **3.06** | 31 | 31 | 0 | 167.2 | 130 | 62 | 57 | **83*** | **173** |
| Will Wilson | 0 | 0 | 9.00 | 1 | 0 | 0 | 2.0 | 2 | 2 | 2 | 0 | 0 |
| **Totals** | **88** | **74** | **3.71** | **162** | **162** | **47** | **1442.0** | **1291** | **649** | **595** | **527** | **1381** |

== Postseason ==
=== Batting ===
Note: G = Games played; AB = At bats; R = Runs scored; H = Hits; 2B = Doubles; 3B = Triples; HR = Home runs; RBI = Runs batted in; BB = Walks; AVG = Batting average; SB = Stolen bases

| Player | G | AB | R | H | 2B | 3B | HR | RBI | BB | AVG | SB |
|---|---|---|---|---|---|---|---|---|---|---|---|
| Gabriel Arias | 3 | 10 | 0 | 2 | 0 | 0 | 0 | 1 | 0 | .200 | 0 |
| Chase DeLauter | 2 | 6 | 0 | 1 | 0 | 0 | 0 | 0 | 1 | .167 | 0 |
| Petey Halpin | 2 | 0 | 0 | 0 | 0 | 0 | 0 | 0 | 0 | — | 0 |
| Austin Hedges | 1 | 1 | 0 | 0 | 0 | 0 | 0 | 0 | 2 | .000 | 0 |
| C. J. Kayfus | 3 | 6 | 0 | 1 | 0 | 0 | 0 | 0 | 1 | .167 | 0 |
| Steven Kwan | 3 | 12 | 2 | 2 | 2 | 0 | 0 | 0 | 0 | .167 | 0 |
| Kyle Manzardo | 3 | 11 | 0 | 1 | 0 | 0 | 0 | 0 | 1 | .091 | 0 |
| Ángel Martínez | 1 | 3 | 1 | 1 | 0 | 0 | 0 | 0 | 0 | .333 | 0 |
| Bo Naylor | 3 | 8 | 1 | 1 | 0 | 0 | 1 | 3 | 0 | .125 | 0 |
| Jhonkensy Noel | 1 | 3 | 0 | 0 | 0 | 0 | 0 | 0 | 0 | .000 | 0 |
| José Ramírez | 3 | 8 | 1 | 2 | 0 | 0 | 0 | 1 | 4 | .250 | 0 |
| Brayan Rocchio | 3 | 9 | 2 | 2 | 0 | 0 | 1 | 1 | 0 | .222 | 0 |
| Johnathan Rodriguez | 2 | 3 | 0 | 0 | 0 | 0 | 0 | 0 | 0 | .000 | 0 |
| Daniel Schneemann | 3 | 3 | 1 | 1 | 1 | 0 | 0 | 1 | 0 | .333 | 0 |
| George Valera | 3 | 7 | 2 | 2 | 0 | 0 | 1 | 1 | 0 | .286 | 0 |
| Totals | 3 | 90 | 10 | 16 | 4 | 0 | 3 | 10 | 9 | .178 | 0 |

=== Pitching ===
Note: W = Wins; L = Losses; ERA = Earned run average; G = Games pitched; GS = Games started; SV = Saves; IP = Innings pitched; H = Hits allowed; R = Runs allowed; ER = Earned runs allowed; BB = Walks allowed; K = Strikeouts

| Player | W | L | ERA | G | GS | SV | IP | H | R | ER | BB | K |
|---|---|---|---|---|---|---|---|---|---|---|---|---|
| Tanner Bibee | 0 | 0 | 1.93 | 1 | 1 | 0 | 4.2 | 5 | 1 | 1 | 3 | 6 |
| Joey Cantillo | 0 | 1 | 3.38 | 1 | 0 | 0 | 2.2 | 2 | 1 | 1 | 2 | 3 |
| Slade Cecconi | 0 | 0 | 3.86 | 1 | 1 | 0 | 2.1 | 2 | 1 | 1 | 1 | 3 |
| Matt Festa | 0 | 0 | 0.00 | 1 | 0 | 0 | 0.2 | 0 | 0 | 0 | 1 | 1 |
| Hunter Gaddis | 0 | 0 | 6.75 | 3 | 0 | 0 | 2.2 | 5 | 2 | 2 | 1 | 3 |
| Tim Herrin | 0 | 0 | 0.00 | 2 | 0 | 0 | 1.1 | 1 | 0 | 0 | 0 | 3 |
| Jakob Junis | 0 | 0 | 0.00 | 2 | 0 | 0 | 1.2 | 0 | 0 | 0 | 1 | 0 |
| Erik Sabrowski | 0 | 0 | 10.80 | 3 | 0 | 0 | 1.2 | 2 | 2 | 2 | 1 | 2 |
| Cade Smith | 1 | 0 | 0.00 | 3 | 0 | 0 | 3.1 | 0 | 0 | 0 | 2 | 4 |
| Gavin Williams | 0 | 1 | 0.00 | 1 | 1 | 0 | 6.0 | 5 | 2 | 0 | 1 | 8 |
| Totals | 1 | 2 | 2.33 | 3 | 3 | 0 | 27.0 | 22 | 9 | 7 | 13 | 33 |

On July 1, 2025, Cleveland Guardians pitcher Gavin Williams recorded an unusual inning against the Chicago Cubs at Wrigley Field, retiring three baserunners via “non-plate appearance outs” in one inning; one at home plate and two on pickoffs at first base—marking the first such occurrence for Cleveland since at least 1920, and the first in MLB since April 13, 1985.

== Farm system ==
| Level | Team | League | Manager |
|---|---|---|---|
| AAA | Columbus Clippers | International League | Andy Tracy |
| AA | Akron RubberDucks | Eastern League | Greg DiCenzo |
| High-A | Lake County Captains | Midwest League | Omir Santos |
| Low–A | Lynchburg Hillcats | Carolina League | Jordan Smith |
| Rookie | ACL Guardians | Arizona Complex League | Juan De La Cruz |
| Rookie | DSL Guardians Goryl | Dominican Summer League | Mac Seibert |
| Rookie | DSL Guardians Mendoza | Dominican Summer League | Jonathan López |
