= Grant Fink =

American baseball coach (born 1990)

Cleveland Guardians – No. 56
- Coach
- Born: December 14, 1990 (age 34); Spokane, Washington, U.S.
- Bats: Right Throws: Right

Teams
- Cleveland Guardians (2025–present)

Grant Fink (born December 14, 1990) is an American former professional baseball infielder and current coach for the Cleveland Guardians of Major League Baseball (MLB).

== Playing career ==
Fink attended Mead High School in Washington, where he was a member of the baseball and basketball teams. He was drafted by the Cleveland Indians in the 23rd round of the 2013 Major League Baseball draft, after playing college baseball for the Missouri Western Griffons. Fink ended the 2013 season with the Mahoning Valley Scrappers. He played the following two years with the Lake County Captains, then joined the Washington Wild Things of the Frontier League in 2016 for his final season as an active player.

== Coaching career ==
Fink returned to the Cleveland Indians organization in 2017 to begin his coaching career as minor league hitting coach. On November 14, 2024, Fink was promoted to the role of major league hitting coach for the Guardians, replacing Chris Valaika.

Sporting positions
| Preceded by Chris Valaika | Cleveland Guardians hitting coach 2025–present | Succeeded by Incumbent |
