= Eric Wagaman =

American baseball player (born 1997)

Free agent
- Utility player
- Born: August 14, 1997 (age 29); Mission Viejo, California, U.S.
- Bats: Right Throws: Right

MLB debut
- September 10, 2024, for the Los Angeles Angels

MLB statistics (through 2026 season)
- Batting average: .245
- Home runs: 13
- Runs batted in: 68
- Stats at Baseball Reference

Teams
- Los Angeles Angels (2024); Miami Marlins (2025); New York Mets (2026)

Eric Wagaman (born August 14, 1997) is an American professional baseball utility player who is a free agent. He has previously played in MLB for the Los Angeles Angels, Miami Marlins, and New York Mets.

== Career ==
=== New York Yankees ===
Wagaman was drafted by the New York Yankees in the 13th round, with the 392nd overall selection, of the 2017 Major League Baseball draft. He made his professional debut with the rookie–level Pulaski Yankees. Wagaman spent 2018 with the Low–A Staten Island Yankees, playing in 64 games and hitting .194/.244/.333 with five home runs and 18 RBI.

He split the 2019 campaign between the rookie–level Gulf Coast League Yankees and Single–A Charleston RiverDogs, slashing .233/.293/.342 with seven home runs and 41 RBI over 88 total games. Wagaman did not play in a game in 2020 due to the cancellation of the minor league season because of the COVID-19 pandemic.

Wagaman returned to action in 2021 with the Single–A Tampa Tarpons and High–A Hudson Valley Renegades. In 78 games split between the two affiliates, he slashed .220/.315/.364 with six home runs and 34 RBI in 264 at bats.

Wagaman played 2022 with Hudson Valley and the Double–A Somerset Patriots, playing in 69 games and hitting .258/.346/.468 with a career–high 13 home runs and 32 RBI. He spent the 2023 campaign with Somerset, appearing in 35 games and posting a .320/.382/.500 batting line in 120 at bats with five home runs, 16 RBI, and 13 stolen bases.

=== Los Angeles Angels ===
On December 6, 2023, Wagaman was selected by the Los Angeles Angels in the minor league phase of the Rule 5 draft. In 121 games split between the Double–A Rocket City Trash Pandas and Triple–A Salt Lake Bees, he slashed .274/.339/.469 with 17 home runs, 60 RBI, and 10 stolen bases, while playing 42 games in the outfield, 29 games at third base, and 17 games at first base. On September 10, 2024, Wagaman was selected to the 40-man roster and promoted to the major leagues for the first time. In 18 games during his rookie campaign (17 at third base and one in left field), he slashed .250/.270/.403 with two home runs and 10 RBI. On November 19, Wagaman was designated for assignment by the Angels. Three days later, the Angels non–tendered Wagaman, making him a free agent.

=== Miami Marlins ===
On December 20, 2024, Wagaman signed a one–year, major league contract with the Miami Marlins. He made 140 appearances for the Marlins, batting .250/.296/.378 with nine home runs, 53 RBI, and four stolen bases. On December 29, 2025, Wagaman was designated for assignment by the Marlins following the acquisition of Esteury Ruiz.

=== Minnesota Twins ===
On January 2, 2026, Wagaman was traded to the Minnesota Twins in exchange for Kade Bragg. He was optioned to the Triple-A St. Paul Saints to begin the regular season. Wagaman made 18 appearances for the Saints, slashing .159/.284/.254 with one home run, six RBI, and one stolen base. On April 23, Wagaman was designated for assignment by Minnesota.

=== New York Mets ===
On April 27, 2026, Wagaman was claimed off of waivers by the New York Mets. He made two appearances for the Triple-A Syracuse Mets, going 3-for-5 (.600) with five RBI. On May 3, Wagaman was designated for assignment by New York. He cleared waivers and was sent outright to Syracuse on May 10. On May 26, New York added Wagaman back to their active roster. In his first start for the Mets on May 27, Wagaman hit a home run in his first at-bat against Cincinnati Reds starter Andrew Abbott, in a 4-2 Mets win. On August 8, Wagaman was sent back down to the AAA Syracuse Mets, replaced on the major league roster by Gabriel Arias. On November 1, he was sent outright off the 40-man roster and elected free agency.

== See also ==
- Rule 5 draft results
