= Nic Enright =

American baseball player (born 1997)

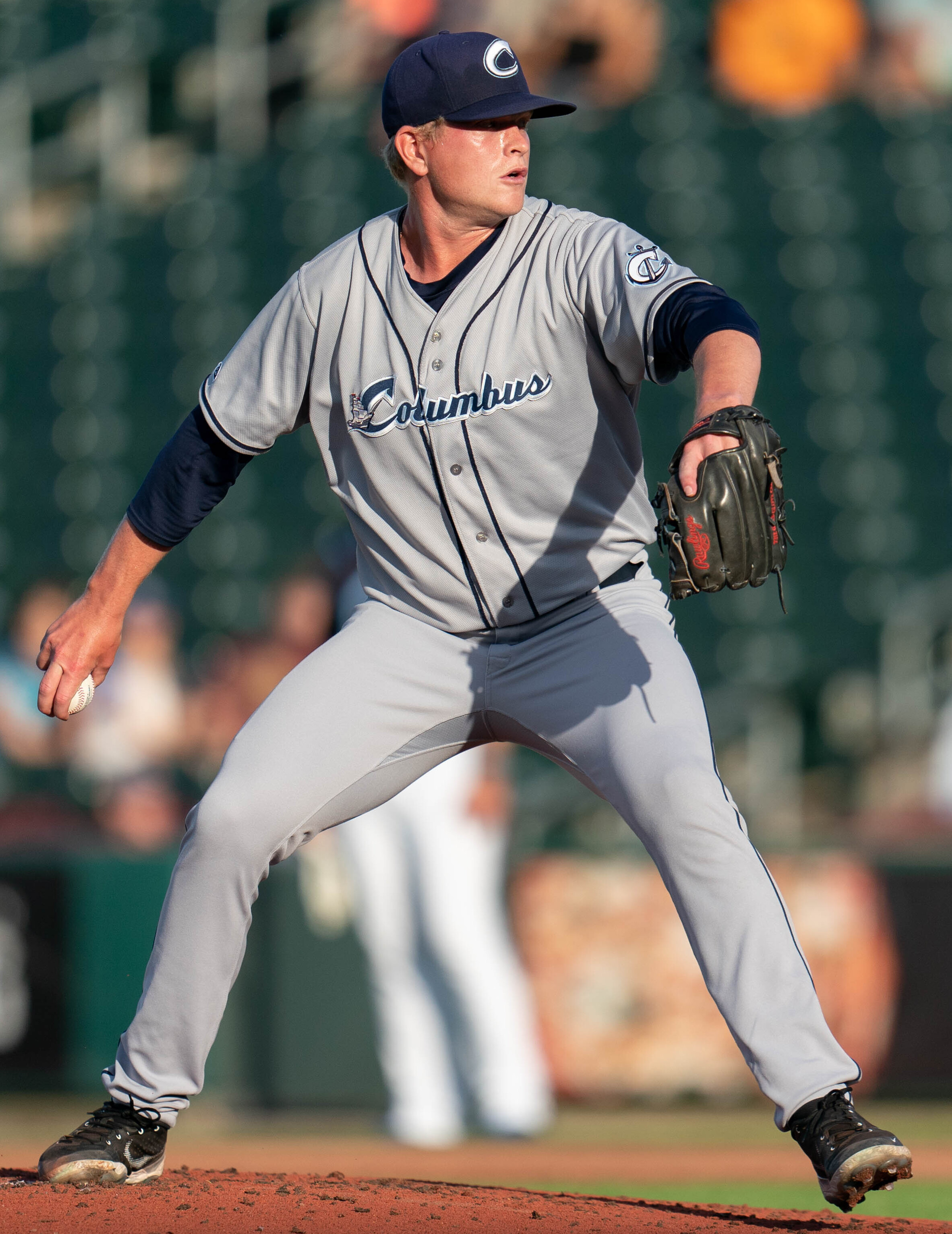
- Enright with the Columbus Clippers in 2022

Toronto Blue Jays
- Pitcher
- Born: January 8, 1997 (age 29); Richmond, Virginia, U.S.
- Bats: Right Throws: Right

MLB debut
- May 25, 2025, for the Cleveland Guardians

MLB statistics (through 2025 season)
- Win–loss record: 2–1
- Earned run average: 2.03
- Strikeouts: 30
- Stats at Baseball Reference

Teams
- Cleveland Guardians (2025)

Nicholas Crispen Enright (born January 8, 1997) is an American professional baseball pitcher in the Toronto Blue Jays organization. He has previously played in Major League Baseball (MLB) for the Cleveland Guardians.

== Career ==
=== Amateur ===
Enright attended The Steward School in Richmond, Virginia. As a senior in 2015, he was the Gatorade Baseball Player of the Year for Virginia. He was drafted by the New York Mets in the 19th round of the 2015 Major League Baseball draft, but did not sign and played college baseball at Virginia Tech. In 2018, he briefly played collegiate summer baseball with the Cotuit Kettleers of the Cape Cod Baseball League.

=== Cleveland Indians / Guardians ===
Enright was drafted by the Cleveland Indians in the 20th round, with the 610th overall selection, of the 2019 MLB draft, and signed. Enright made his professional debut with the rookie-level Arizona League Indians. He did not play in a game in 2020 due to the cancellation of the minor league season because of the COVID-19 pandemic.

Enright returned in 2021 to play for the High-A Lake County Captains and Double-A Akron RubberDucks. Enright started 2022 with Akron before being promoted to the Triple-A Columbus Clippers.

=== Miami Marlins ===
On December 7, 2022, Enright was selected by the Miami Marlins in the Rule 5 draft, adding him to their 40-man roster.

On February 13, 2023, Enright announced that he was diagnosed with Hodgkin’s lymphoma in December, and had already completed his first round of treatments. Enright began a rehab assignment with the Single-A Jupiter Hammerheads on April 28, and was later elevated to the Triple-A Jacksonville Jumbo Shrimp. On May 29, Enright was activated off of the injured list and designated for assignment by the Marlins.

=== Cleveland Guardians (second stint) ===
Enright was returned to the Guardians on June 1, 2023. In 16 appearances for the Triple–A Columbus Clippers, he logged a 1.06 ERA with 31 strikeouts and 3 saves across 17 innings pitched. On November 19, 2024, the Guardians added Enright to their 40-man roster to protect him from the Rule 5 draft.

Enright was optioned to Triple-A Columbus to begin the 2025 season. In nine appearances for the Clippers, he recorded a 2.00 ERA with seven strikeouts and one save over nine innings pitched. On May 24, 2025, Enright was promoted to the major leagues for the first time. On June 25, he recorded his first career win, tossing the scoreless 10th inning of a 5–4 victory over Toronto Blue Jays. On August 4, Enright earned his first career save. He made 27 appearances for Cleveland during his rookie campaign, compiling a 2–1 record and 2.03 ERA with 30 strikeouts across 31 innings of work. On October 7, it was announced that Enright would require Tommy John surgery, ruling him out for the entirety of the 2026 season. He was designated for assignment by the Guardians on November 18. On November 21, Enright was non-tendered by Cleveland and became a free agent.

=== Toronto Blue Jays ===
On December 31, 2025, Enright signed a two-year minor league contract with the Toronto Blue Jays. On April 27, 2026, Enright was placed on the full-season injured list ruling him out for the season.

== See also ==
- Rule 5 draft results
