= Gabriel Arias (infielder) =

Venezuelan baseball player (born 2000)

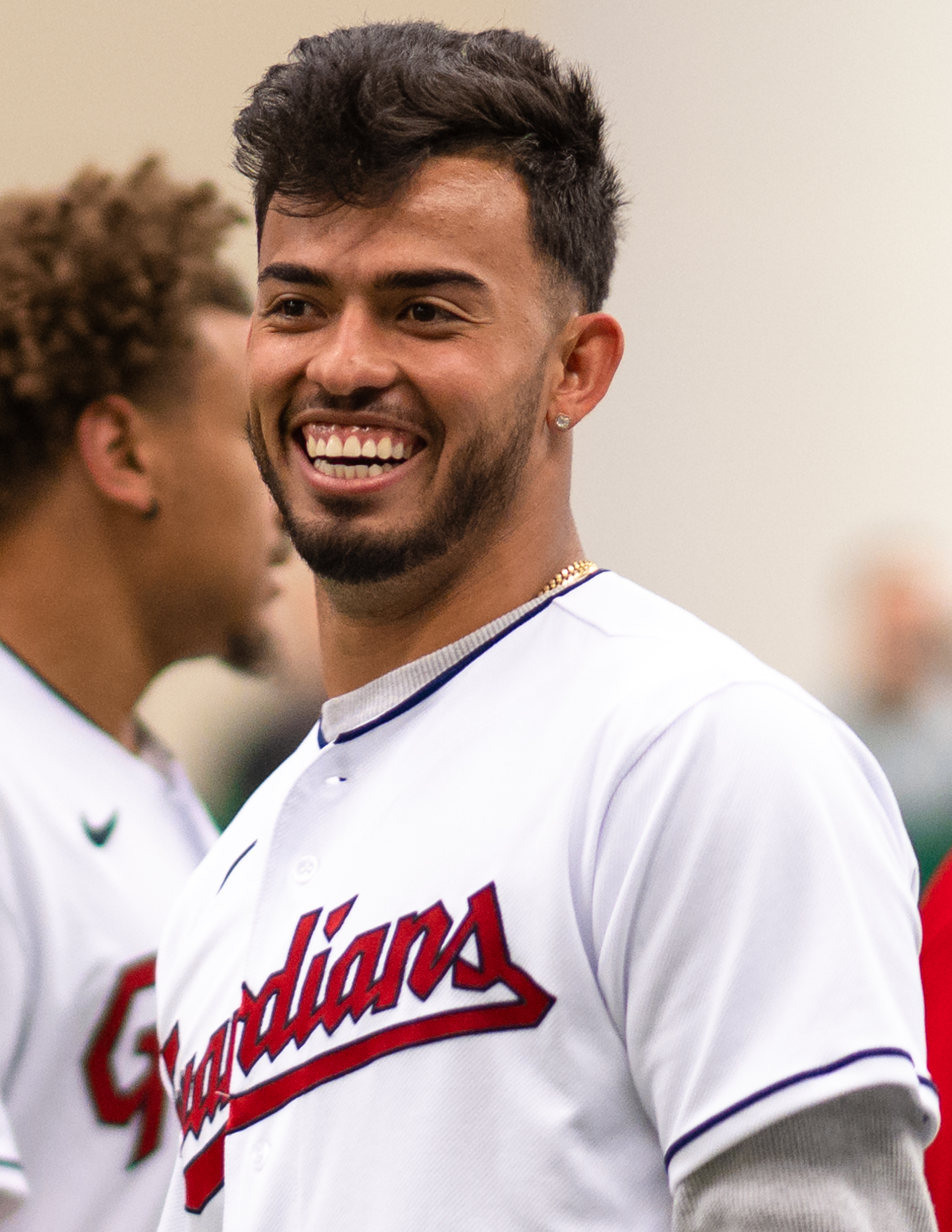
- Arias with the Cleveland Guardians in 2023

Free agent
- Infielder
- Born: February 27, 2000 (age 26); La Victoria, Venezuela
- Bats: Right Throws: Right

MLB debut
- April 20, 2022, for the Cleveland Guardians

MLB statistics (through 2026 season)
- Batting average: .219
- Home runs: 30
- Runs batted in: 114
- Stats at Baseball Reference

Teams
- Cleveland Guardians (2022–2026); New York Mets (2026); Chicago Cubs (2026)
Medals
Men's baseball
Representing Venezuela
U-15 Baseball World Cup
Bronze medal – third place	2014 Mazatlán	Team

Gabriel Alejandro Arias Gómez (born February 27, 2000) is a Venezuelan professional baseball infielder who is a free agent. He has previously played in Major League Baseball (MLB) for the Cleveland Guardians, New York Mets, and Chicago Cubs.

== Career ==
=== San Diego Padres ===
Arias signed with the San Diego Padres as an international free agent in July 2016. He played his first professional season in 2017 with the Arizona League Padres and Fort Wayne TinCaps. After the season he played in the Australian Baseball League for the Canberra Cavalry. Arias played 2018 with the Fort Wayne and 2019 with the Lake Elsinore Storm. In 2020, he was invited to spring training with the Padres.

=== Cleveland Indians / Guardians ===
On August 31, 2020, the Padres traded Arias, Austin Hedges, Josh Naylor, Cal Quantrill, Owen Miller, and Joey Cantillo to the Cleveland Indians in exchange for Mike Clevinger, Greg Allen, and Matt Waldron. The Indians selected Arias' contract on November 20, 2020, adding him to their 40-man roster. He spent the 2021 season with the Triple-A Columbus Clippers.

After beginning the 2022 season with Columbus, Arias was recalled by the Cleveland Guardians as the 29th man for their April 20, 2022, doubleheader against the Chicago White Sox. Arias made his major league debut in Game 1 of the team's doubleheader, starting at second base. On September 28, Arias hit his first career home run, a solo shot off of Tampa Bay Rays starter Tyler Glasnow.

On April 8, 2026, it was announced that Arias would miss four-to-eight weeks after being diagnosed with a moderate strain of his left hamstring. He was transferred to the 60-day injured list on May 29. Arias was activated on June 14. In 42 appearances for Cleveland, he slashed .244/.284/.386 with five home runs, 11 RBI, and four stolen bases. Arias was designated for assignment by the Guardians on August 5.

=== New York Mets ===
On August 7, 2026, the New York Mets claimed Arias off of waivers. He was assigned to the major league team the following day, with Eric Wagaman being sent down to the Triple–A Syracuse Mets to clear roster space for him. Arias appeared in two games for New York, going hitless with one strikeout across five at–bats. He was designated for assignment by the Mets on August 17.

=== Chicago Cubs ===
On August 19, 2026, the Chicago Cubs claimed Arias off waivers. On November 20, he was non-tendered by the Cubs and became a free agent.
