= Johnathan Rodríguez =

Puerto Rican baseball player (born 1999)

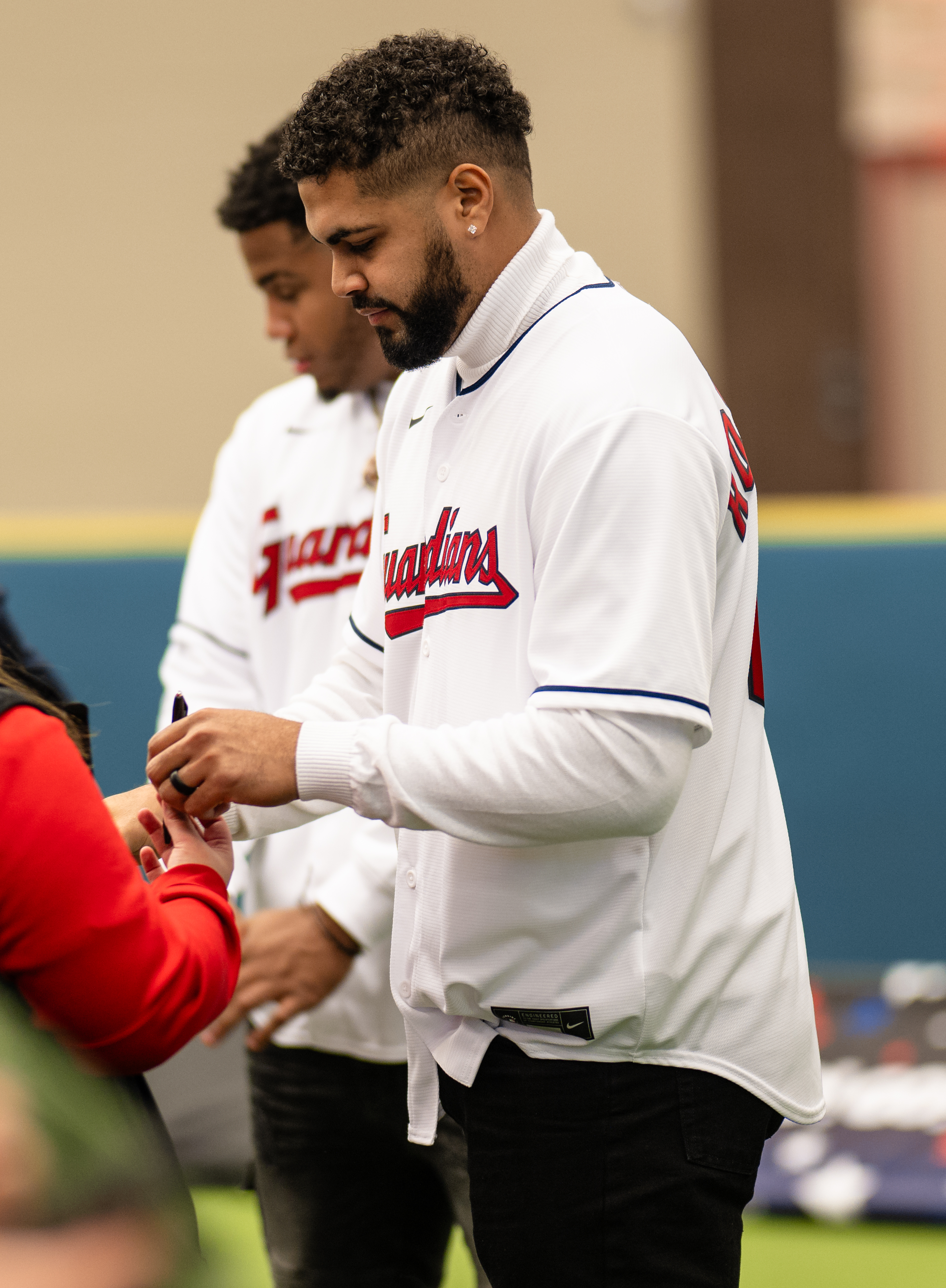
- Rodríguez at Guards Fest in 2024

Free agent
- Outfielder
- Born: November 4, 1999 (age 27); Toa Baja, Puerto Rico
- Bats: Right Throws: Right

MLB debut
- May 21, 2024, for the Cleveland Guardians

MLB statistics (through 2026 season)
- Batting average: .177
- Home runs: 2
- Runs batted in: 17
- Stats at Baseball Reference

Teams
- Cleveland Guardians (2024–2025); Baltimore Orioles (2026)

Johnathan José Rodríguez (born November 4, 1999) is a Puerto Rican professional baseball outfielder who is a free agent. He has previously played in MLB for the Cleveland Guardians and Baltimore Orioles.

== Career ==
=== Cleveland Indians / Guardians ===
Rodríguez is from Toa Baja, Puerto Rico. He attended the Carlos Beltran Baseball Academy in Florida, Puerto Rico. The Cleveland Indians selected Rodríguez in the third round, with the 102nd pick, in the 2017 Major League Baseball draft.

Rodríguez began the 2023 season with the Akron RubberDucks of the Double-A Eastern League and was promoted during the season to the Columbus Clippers of the Triple-A International League. After the season, he was named to the Eastern League's postseason All-Star team. On November 3, 2023, the Guardians added Rodríguez to their 40-man roster to prevent him from becoming a minor league free agent. He was optioned to Triple-A Columbus to begin the 2024 season.

On May 20, 2024, Rodríguez was promoted to the major leagues for the first time. In 13 games during his rookie campaign, he went 4–for–31 (.129) with five RBI. Rodríguez won the 2024 International League MVP Award after a season that saw him slash .301/.390/.540 with 29 home runs and 94 RBI across 118 games.

Rodríguez was optioned to Triple-A Columbus to begin the 2025 season. On July 18, 2025, Rodríguez hit his first career home run off of JP Sears of the Athletics. In 32 appearances for Cleveland during the regular season, he batted .197/.260/.366 with two home runs, 10 RBI, and one stolen base.

On March 25, 2026, Rodríguez was designated for assignment by the Guardians.

=== Baltimore Orioles ===
On March 29, 2026, the Guardians traded Rodríguez to the Baltimore Orioles in exchange for Carter Rustad. He began the regular season with the Triple-A Norfolk Tides and was promoted to the major leagues when Tyler O'Neill was placed on the injured list due to a concussion on April 12. In seven appearances for Baltimore, Rodríguez went 2-for-11 (.182) with two RBI and three stolen bases. On July 23, Rodríguez was designated for assignment by the Orioles.

=== Pittsburgh Pirates ===
On July 27, 2026, Rodríguez was traded to the Pittsburgh Pirates in exchange for cash considerations. He made 15 appearances for the Triple–A Indianapolis Indians, slashing .351/.424/.509 with two home runs and 12 RBI. Rodríguez was designated for assignment by Pittsburgh on August 17.

=== Athletics ===
On August 20, 2026, Rodríguez was claimed off of waivers by the Athletics. On October 29, he was sent outright to Triple-A Las Vegas Aviators. He elected free agency on November 2.
