= CJ Kayfus =

American baseball player (born 2001)

C. J. Kayfus
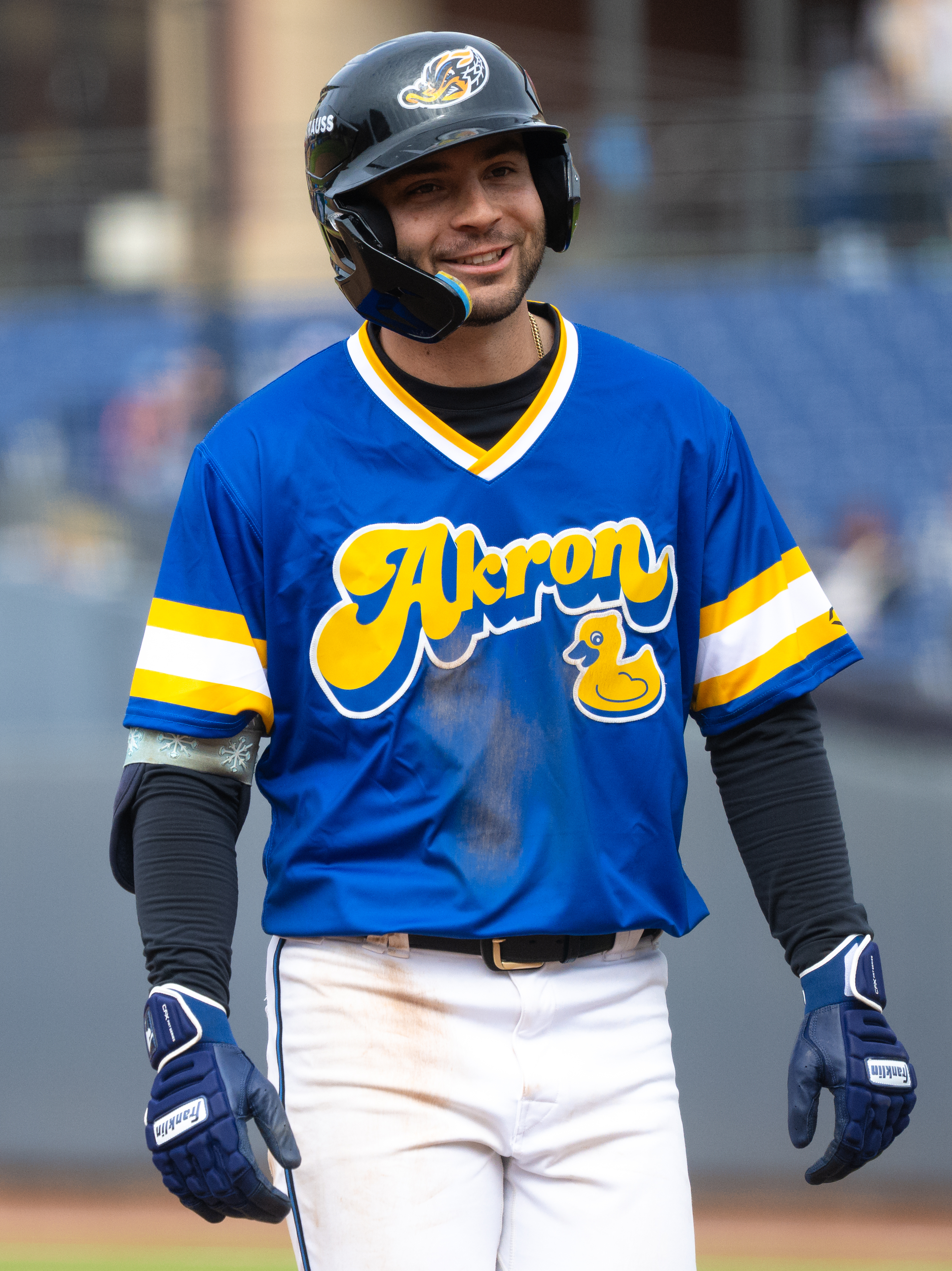
- Kayfus with the Akron RubberDucks in 2025

Cleveland Guardians – No. 2
- First baseman / Outfielder
- Born: October 28, 2001 (age 25); Boca Raton, Florida, U.S.
- Bats: Left Throws: Left

MLB debut
- August 2, 2025, for the Cleveland Guardians

MLB statistics (through 2026 season)
- Batting average: .214
- Home runs: 5
- Runs batted in: 21
- Stats at Baseball Reference

Teams
- Cleveland Guardians (2025–present)

Collin Joseph Kayfus (born October 28, 2001) is an American professional baseball first baseman and outfielder for the Cleveland Guardians of Major League Baseball (MLB). He made his MLB debut in 2025.

== Career ==
Kayfus attended Palm Beach Central High School in Wellington, Florida and played college baseball at the University of Miami. In summer 2021, he played collegiate summer baseball with the Wisconsin Woodchucks of the Northwoods League. In 2022, he played with the Cotuit Kettleers of the Cape Cod Baseball League and was named a league all-star.

Kayfus was selected by the Cleveland Guardians in the third round of the 2023 Major League Baseball draft. He signed with the Guardians and made his professional debut with the Lynchburg Hillcats. He started 2024 with the Lake County Captains before being promoted to the Akron RubberDucks. Kayfus started 2025 with Akron before being promoted to the Columbus Clippers in April.

On August 2, 2025, Kayfus was selected to the 40-man roster and promoted to the major leagues for the first time, debuting the same day against the Twins. On August 9, Kayfus hit his first major league home run against Bryan Hudson of the Chicago White Sox.

Kayfus played in nine games for Cleveland in 2026, going 4-for-22 (.182) with one home run and two RBI. On July 18, 2026, it was announced that Kayfus had sustained a fracture and ligament damage during a game against Triple-A Columbus the week prior, which necessitated season-ending surgery.
