= George Valera =

American baseball player (born 2000)

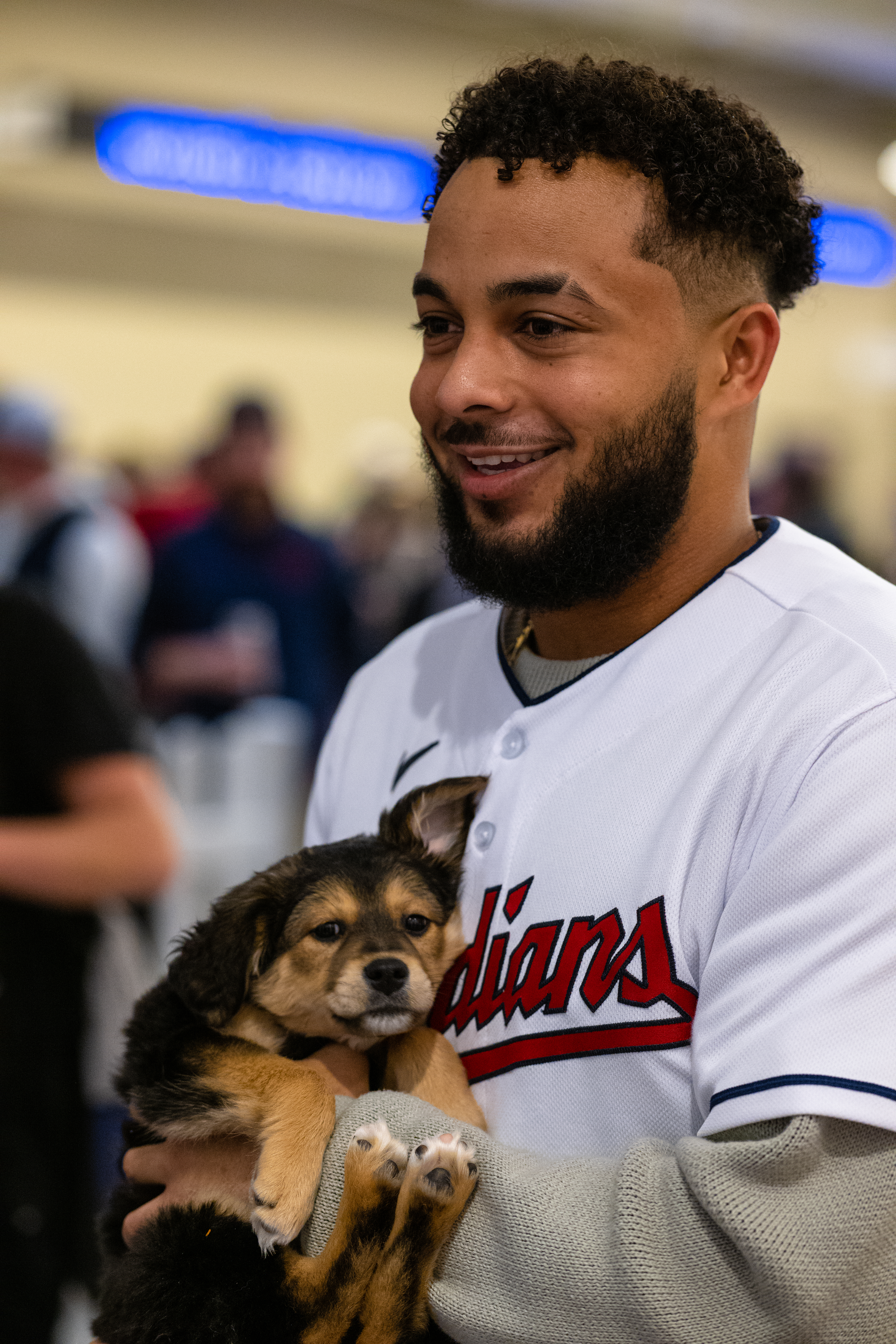
- Valera with the Cleveland Guardians in 2023

Free agent
- Outfielder
- Born: November 13, 2000 (age 26); Queens, New York, U.S.
- Bats: Left Throws: Left

MLB debut
- September 1, 2025, for the Cleveland Guardians

MLB statistics (through 2026 season)
- Batting average: .218
- Home runs: 2
- Runs batted in: 11
- Stats at Baseball Reference

Teams
- Cleveland Guardians (2025–2026)

George Valera (born November 13, 2000) is an American professional baseball outfielder who is a free agent. He has previously played in Major League Baseball (MLB) for the Cleveland Guardians. He made his MLB debut in 2025.

== Career ==
Valera was born in Queens, New York and moved to San Pedro de Macoris, Dominican Republic with his family when he was 13. He signed with the Cleveland Indians as an international free agent on July 2, 2017.

Valera made his professional debut with the rookie–level Arizona League Indians in 2018, batting .333 over six games. He started 2019 with the Low-A Mahoning Valley Scrappers and was promoted to the Single-A Lake County Captains near the season's end. Over 52 games between both affiliates, he batted .217 with eight home runs and 32 RBI. Valera did not play in a game in 2020 due to the cancellation of the minor league season because of the COVID-19 pandemic. Valera split the 2021 season between Lake County and the Double-A Akron RubberDucks, slashing .260/.405/.505 with 19 home runs, 65 RBI, and 11 stolen bases over 86 games.

The newly named Cleveland Guardians selected Valera to their 40-man roster on November 19, 2021, in order to protect him from the Rule 5 draft. In 132 games split between Akron and the Triple-A Columbus Clippers in 2022, he slashed .250/.353/.463 with 24 home runs and 82 RBI.

Valera was optioned to Triple-A Columbus to begin the 2023 season. In 73 games for the Clippers, he batted .211/.343/.375 with 10 home runs and 35 RBI. Valera was again optioned to Triple-A Columbus to begin the 2024 season. In 90 games for Columbus, he slashed .248/.337/.452 with 17 home runs and 50 RBI. On September 16, 2024, it was announced that Valera would undergo season–ending surgery to repair a ruptured patellar tendon in his right knee. Valera was designated for assignment by Cleveland on November 19. On November 22, the Guardians non-tendered Valera, making him a free agent.

On November 25, 2024, Valera re-signed with the Guardians on a minor league contract that included an invitation to major league spring training. In 44 appearances split between the ACL Guardians and Columbus, he batted .318/.388/.550 with seven home runs and 24 RBI. On September 1, 2025, Valera was selected to the 40-man roster and promoted to the major leagues for the first time. He recorded his first career hit on September 3, off of Dustin May of the Boston Red Sox. On September 20, Valera hit his first career home run, a solo shot off of Minnesota Twins starter Joe Ryan.

Valera played in 13 games for the Guardians in 2026, slashing .216/.237/.297 with six RBI and one walk. On June 14, 2026, Valera was designated for assignment by Cleveland. He cleared waivers and was sent outright to Triple-A Columbus Clippers on June 21. He elected free agency on November 2.
