= Doug Nikhazy =

American baseball player (born 1999)

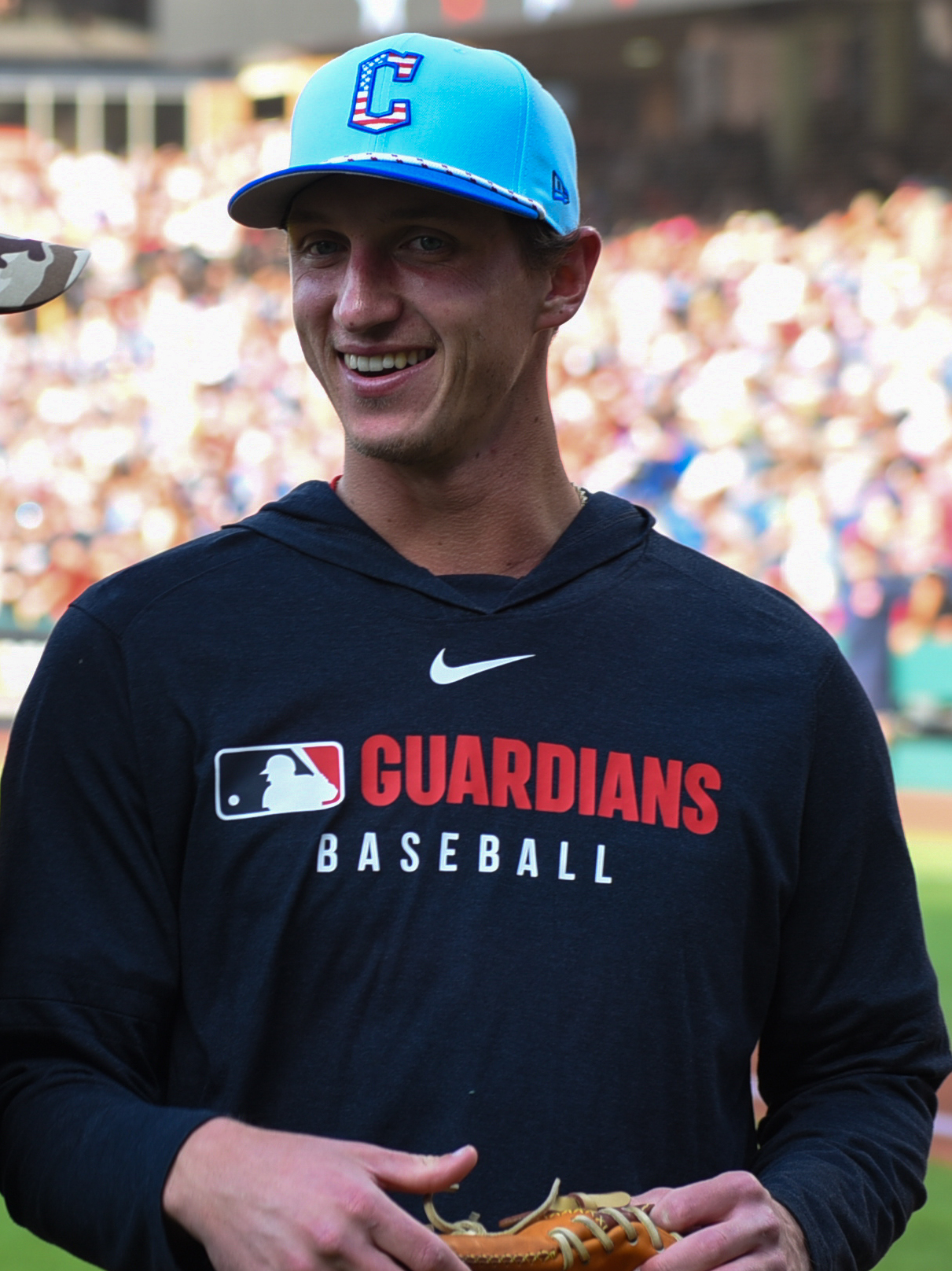
- Nikhazy with the Cleveland Guardians in 2025

Chicago Cubs
- Pitcher
- Born: August 11, 1999 (age 27); Burlington, North Carolina, U.S.
- Bats: Left Throws: Left

MLB debut
- April 26, 2025, for the Cleveland Guardians

MLB statistics (through 2026 season)
- Win–loss record: 0–1
- Earned run average: 10.50
- Strikeouts: 6
- Stats at Baseball Reference

Teams
- Cleveland Guardians (2025); Chicago White Sox (2026)
Medals
Men's baseball
Representing United States
15U Baseball World Cup
Silver medal – second place	2014 Mazatlán	Team

Douglas Samuel Nikhazy (born August 11, 1999) is an American professional baseball pitcher in the Chicago Cubs organization. He has previously played in Major League Baseball (MLB) for the Cleveland Guardians and Chicago White Sox. He played college baseball for the Ole Miss Rebels.

== Amateur career ==
Nikhazy grew up in Windermere, Florida. In eighth grade he was selected to the Under-15 United States national baseball team. Nikhazy attended West Orange High School, where he pitched and played right field on the baseball team. He committed to play college baseball at Ole Miss during his freshman year.

Nikhazy was named a freshman All-American after posting a 9-3 record and a 3.31 ERA with Ole Miss freshman record 86 strikeouts. After the season he was selected to play on the Team USA collegiate national baseball team. 3-1 record and 2.35 ERA with 31 strikeouts in four starts before the season was cut short due to the coronavirus pandemic. He was named first team All-Southeastern Conference (SEC) and was a consensus first team All-American as a junior after going 12-2 with a 2.45 ERA and 142 strikeouts over 92 innings pitched.

== Professional career ==
=== Cleveland Indians / Guardians ===
Nikhazy was selected by the Cleveland Indians in the second round with the 58th overall pick of the 2021 Major League Baseball draft. On July 23, 2021, Nikhazy signed with the Indians for a $1.2 million bonus. He made his professional debut in 2022 with the Lake County Captains of the High-A Midwest League. Nikhazy spent the 2023 campaign with the Double-A Akron RubberDucks. In 26 appearances (22 starts) for the team, he compiled a 4-8 record and 4.94 ERA with 128 strikeouts over 102 innings of work.

Nikhazy split the 2024 campaign between Akron and the Triple–A Columbus Clippers, posting a cumulative 7–4 record and 2.98 ERA with 124 strikeouts across 123 2/3 innings pitched. On November 19, 2024, the Guardians added Nikhazy to their 40-man roster to protect him from the Rule 5 draft.

Nikhazy was optioned to Triple-A Columbus to begin the 2025 season. On April 26, 2025, Nikhazy was promoted to the major leagues for the first time as the 27th man for Cleveland's doubleheader against the Boston Red Sox. He made two appearances for the Guardians during his rookie campaign, but struggled to an 0-1 record and 13.50 ERA with five strikeouts over four innings of work.

Nikhazy was again optioned to Triple-A Columbus to begin the 2026 season. On March 30, 2026, Nikhazy was designated for assignment by the Guardians.

=== Chicago White Sox ===
On April 6, 2026, Nikhazy was claimed off waivers by the Chicago White Sox. He made one appearance for Chicago, allowing one run over two innings; in three appearances for the Triple-A Charlotte Knights, he struggled to an 0-1 record and 8.71 ERA.

=== Chicago Cubs ===
On April 28, 2026, Nikhazy was claimed off waivers by the Chicago Cubs. He made eight appearances (including six starts) for the Triple-A Iowa Cubs, posting an 0-1 record and 8.44 ERA with 30 strikeouts across 26 2/3 innings pitched. Nikhazy was designated for assignment by the Cubs on June 15. He cleared waivers and was sent outright to Triple-A Iowa on June 17.

== Personal life ==
In February 2020, Nikhazy was arrested in Oxford, Mississippi for driving under the influence. He was released the same night of the arrest, issued an apology, and returned to the baseball team without missing any playing time.
