= Ángel Martínez (baseball) =

Dominican baseball player (born 2002)

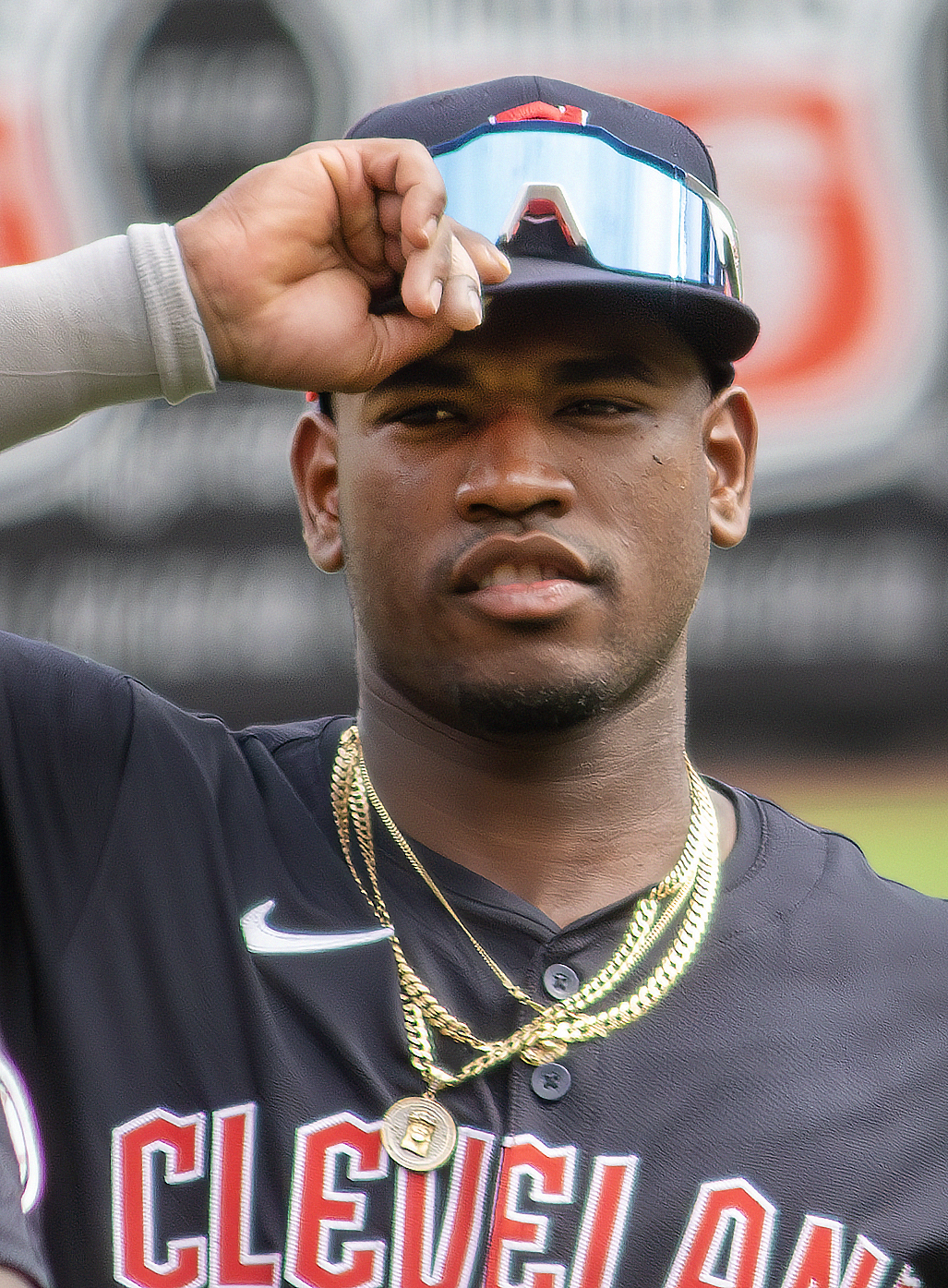
- Martínez with the Cleveland Guardians in 2024

Cleveland Guardians – No. 1
- Infielder
- Born: January 27, 2002 (age 24); Santo Domingo, Dominican Republic
- Bats: Switch Throws: Right

MLB debut
- June 22, 2024, for the Cleveland Guardians

MLB statistics (through 2026 season)
- Batting average: .237
- Home runs: 32
- Runs batted in: 118
- Stats at Baseball Reference

Teams
- Cleveland Guardians (2024–present)

Ángel Kevin Martínez Mejía (born January 27, 2002) is a Dominican professional baseball infielder for the Cleveland Guardians of Major League Baseball (MLB). He made his MLB debut in 2024.

== Professional career ==
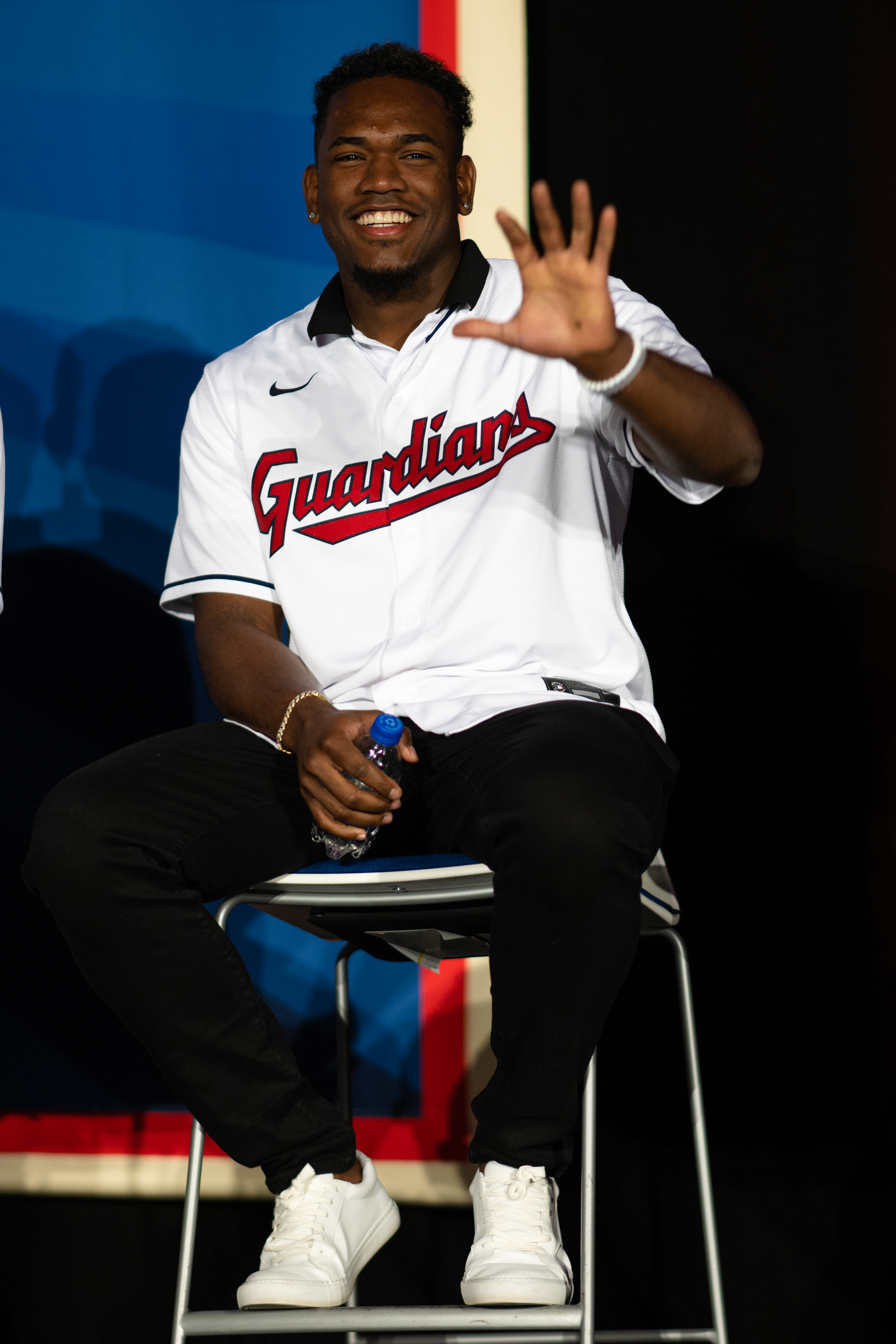
Ángel Martínez, outfielder with the Cleveland Guardians during Guards Fest at Huntington Convention Center of Cleveland on January 21, 2023.

Martínez signed with the Cleveland Indians as an international free agent on July 2, 2018. He made his professional debut in 2019 with the Dominican Summer League Indians, hitting .306/.402/.428 with one home run, 27 RBI, and 11 stolen bases. Martínez did not play in a game in 2020 due to the cancellation of the Minor League Baseball season because of the COVID-19 pandemic.

Martínez returned to action in 2021 with the Single-A Lynchburg Hillcats, playing in 97 games and slashing .241/.319/.382 with seven home runs, 46 RBI, and 13 stolen bases. He split the 2022 campaign between the High-A Lake County Captains and Double–A Akron RubberDucks. In 102 games split between the two affiliates, Martínez accumulated a .278/.378/.471 batting line with 13 home runs, 44 RBI, and 12 stolen bases.

On November 15, 2022, the Guardians added Martínez to their 40-man roster to protect him from the Rule 5 draft. Martínez was optioned to the Triple-A Columbus Clippers to begin the 2023 season. In 136 games split between the Akron and Columbus, he hit a combined .251/.321/.394 with 14 home runs, 79 RBI, and 11 stolen bases.

Martínez began the 2024 season on the major league 10-day injured list after suffering a foot contusion in spring training. He was transferred to the 60-day injured list on April 17, 2024, after it was announced he would undergo surgery to repair a hamate fracture in his right wrist. On May 29, Martínez was activated from the injured list and optioned to Triple-A Columbus. On June 21, Martínez was promoted to the major leagues for the first time. In 43 appearances during his rookie campaign, Martínez batted .232/.298/.338 with three home runs, 11 RBI, and three stolen bases.

Martínez was optioned to Triple-A Columbus to begin the 2025 season, but was recalled on April 9. In 139 games, Martinez batted .224/.269/.359 with 11 home runs, 45 RBI, 56 runs scored and eight stolen bases in 10 attempts.

== Personal life ==
His father, Sandy Martínez, played in MLB from 1995 to 2004, for 6 different teams. His cousin, Michael Martínez, played in MLB from 2011 to 2017, including parts of 3 seasons with Cleveland, and currently plays for the High Point Rockers.
