= Zak Kent =

American baseball player (born 1998)

Free agent
- Pitcher
- Born: February 24, 1998 (age 28); Henrico, Virginia, U.S.
- Bats: Right Throws: Right

MLB debut
- April 23, 2025, for the Cleveland Guardians

MLB statistics (through 2026 season)
- Win–loss record: 1–0
- Earned run average: 5.03
- Strikeouts: 28
- Stats at Baseball Reference

Teams
- Cleveland Guardians (2025); Minnesota Twins (2026); Washington Nationals (2026)

Zachary Allen Kent (born February 24, 1998) is an American professional baseball pitcher who is a free agent. He has previously played in Major League Baseball (MLB) for the Cleveland Guardians, Minnesota Twins, and Washington Nationals.

== Amateur career ==
Kent attended Northumberland High School in Heathsville, Virginia. As a sophomore, he was a member of their 1A State Championship team in 2014; a season in which he hit .315 and posted a 1.96 ERA. Kent was named the Virginia High School League's 1A All-State as a pitcher in his senior season of 2016. Undrafted out of high school, Kent attended the Virginia Military Institute (VMI) to play college baseball for the VMI Keydets for three seasons. Kent enjoyed his best season as a junior in 2019, when he went 5–5 with a 4.64 ERA and 132 strikeouts over 97 innings.

== Professional career ==
=== Texas Rangers ===
The Texas Rangers selected Kent in the ninth round, with the 265th overall selection, of the 2019 MLB draft. He signed with Texas for a $140,000 signing bonus.

Kent split his professional debut season of 2019 between the AZL Rangers of the Rookie-level Arizona League and the Spokane Indians of the Low-A Northwest League, going combined 0–1 with a 5.12 ERA and 18 strikeouts over 19 1/3 innings. Kent did not play in 2020 due to the cancellation of the Minor League Baseball season because of the COVID-19 pandemic. He opened the 2021 season with the Hickory Crawdads of the High-A East, going 6–2 with a 2.83 ERA and 78 strikeouts over 60 1/3 innings. After being promoted to the Frisco RoughRiders of the Double-A Central in August, he posted a 0–4 record with a 5.34 ERA and 39 strikeouts over 28 2/3 innings. Kent split the 2022 season between Frisco and the Round Rock Express of the Triple-A Pacific Coast League, going a combined 3–4 with a 3.94 ERA and 110 strikeouts over 109 2/3 innings.

On November 15, 2022, the Rangers selected Kent to their 40-man roster to protect him from the Rule 5 draft. Kent was optioned to Triple-A Round Rock to begin the 2023 season but was placed on the injured list after one game due to an oblique strain. In just 10 games due to injury, Kent posted a 0–1 record with a 3.97 ERA, and 34 strikeouts over 34 innings. Following the 2023 season, Kent played for the Surprise Saguaros of the Arizona Fall League.

=== Cleveland Guardians ===
On March 28, 2024, Kent was traded to the Cleveland Guardians in exchange for international bonus pool space. He was subsequently optioned to the Triple-A Columbus Clippers. Kent was designated for assignment by the Guardians on June 29. After clearing waivers, Cleveland released him on July 5. He re-signed with the organization on a minor league contract on July 16.

On April 21, 2025, Kent was selected to the 40-man roster and promoted to the major leagues for the first time. On September 28, Kent recorded his first career win, allowing two earned runs over two innings pitched against the Texas Rangers. He made 12 appearances for the Guardians during his first MLB season, compiling a 1–0 record and 4.58 ERA with 16 strikeouts across 17 2/3 innings pitched.

=== Minnesota Twins ===
On December 5, 2025, Kent was claimed off waivers by the St. Louis Cardinals. He was designated for assignment on January 6, following the acquisition of Justin Bruihl. On January 9, Kent was claimed off waivers by the Texas Rangers, who designated him for assignment on February 13. On February 16, he was again claimed off waivers by the Cardinals. However, on February 21, Kent was designated for assignment by St. Louis following the signing of Ramón Urías. On February 26, he was claimed off waivers by the Minnesota Twins. In two appearances for Minnesota, Kent recorded a 4.91 ERA with two strikeouts across 3 2/3 innings pitched. On April 28, Kent was designated for assignment by Minnesota following the promotion of Luis García.

=== Washington Nationals ===
On May 3, 2026, Kent was claimed off of waivers by the Washington Nationals. He made nine appearances for the Nationals, recording a 5.68 ERA with 10 strikeouts across 12 2/3 innings pitched. On October 29, the Nationals designated Kent for assignment following the acquisition of Braxton Roxby. He was released by Washington on November 4.

== Personal life ==
Kent is married. He grew up rooting for the Baltimore Orioles.
