= Joey Cantillo =

American baseball player (born 1999)

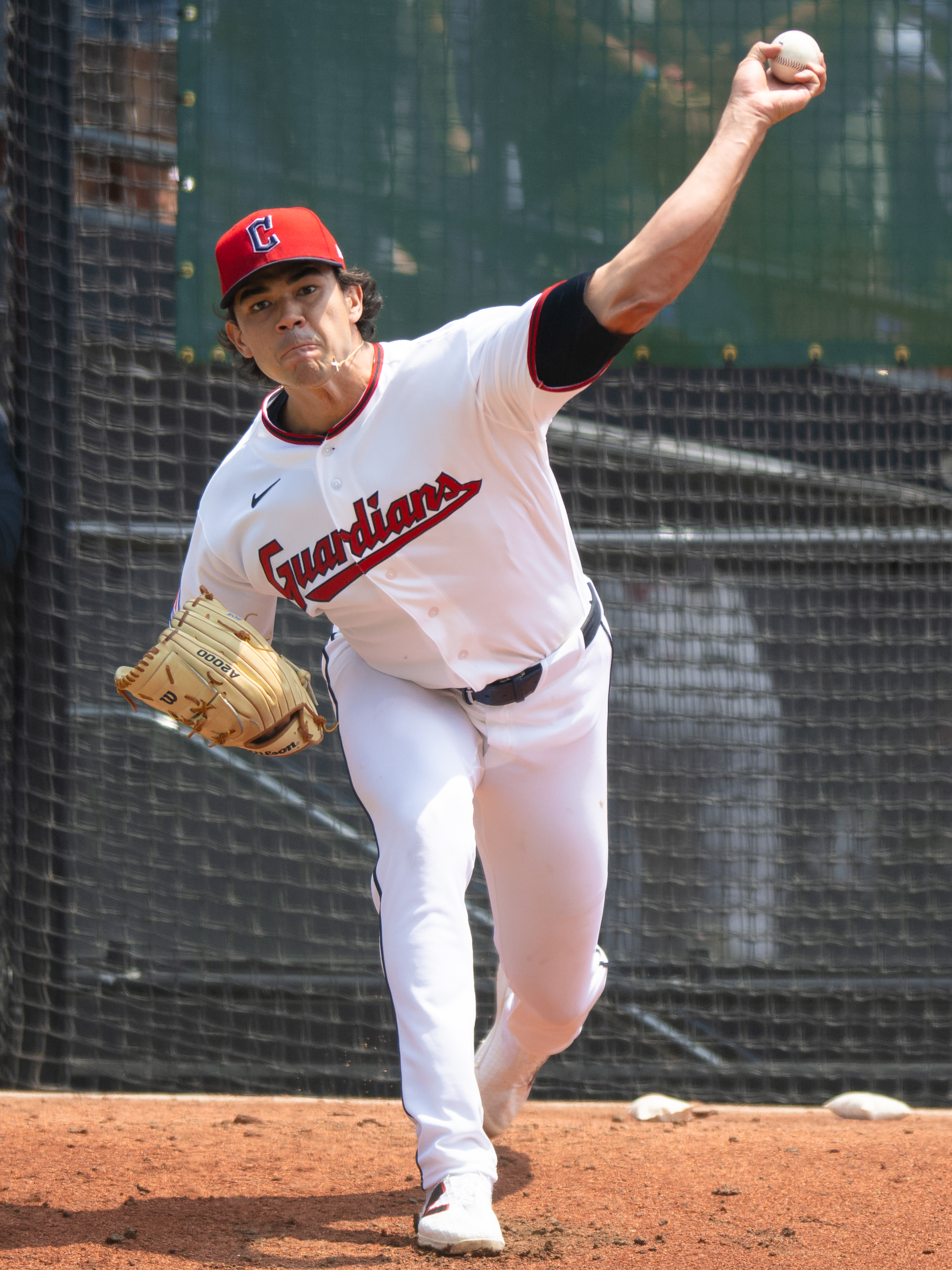
- Cantillo with the Cleveland Guardians in 2026

Cleveland Guardians – No. 54
- Pitcher
- Born: December 18, 1999 (age 26); Honolulu, Hawaii, U.S.
- Bats: Left Throws: Left

MLB debut
- July 28, 2024, for the Cleveland Guardians

MLB statistics (through 2026 season)
- Win–loss record: 18–16
- Earned run average: 3.66
- Strikeouts: 323
- Stats at Baseball Reference

Teams
- Cleveland Guardians (2024–present)

Joseph Lopaka Cantillo (born December 18, 1999) is an American professional baseball pitcher for the Cleveland Guardians of Major League Baseball (MLB). He was selected by the San Diego Padres in the 16th round of the 2017 MLB draft and was traded to Cleveland in 2020. He made his MLB debut in 2024.

== Amateur career ==
Cantillo attended Kailua High School in Kailua, Hawaii where he played baseball. He committed to play college baseball at the University of Kentucky. In 2017, his senior year, he was named the Gatorade Baseball Player of the Year for the state of Hawaii after pitching to a 5–1 record and 1.24 earned run average (ERA) along with batting .517.

== Professional career ==
=== San Diego Padres ===
The San Diego Padres drafted Cantillo in the 16th round, with the 468th overall selection, of the 2017 Major League Baseball draft and he signed for a $302,500 signing bonus. After signing with the Padres, Cantillo made his professional debut with the Rookie-level Arizona League Padres; over eight innings, he compiled a 4.50 ERA. In 2018, he spent the majority of the year back in the Arizona League in which he went 2–2 with a 2.18 ERA over 11 games (nine starts), striking out 58 over 45 1/3 innings. He also pitched in one game for the Fort Wayne TinCaps of the Single–A Midwest League at the end of the year. Cantillo returned to Fort Wayne to begin 2019. During the season, he earned Midwest League Pitcher of the Week three times alongside earning Pitcher of the Month honors for June. After pitching to a 9–3 record and a 1.98 ERA while striking out 128 batters over 98 innings (19 starts) with Fort Wayne, he was promoted to the Lake Elsinore Storm of the High–A California League in August. With Lake Elsinore, Cantillo made three starts in which he compiled a 4.61 ERA before being shut down for the season due to reaching his innings limit.

=== Cleveland Indians / Guardians ===
On July 31, 2020, the Padres traded Cantillo, Austin Hedges, Cal Quantrill, Josh Naylor, Gabriel Arias, and Owen Miller to the Cleveland Indians in exchange for Mike Clevinger, Greg Allen, and Matt Waldron. He did not play in a game in 2020 due to the cancellation of the minor league season because of the COVID-19 pandemic. He began the 2021 season on the injured list with abdominal soreness. He was activated in late August and joined the Akron RubberDucks of the Double-A Northeast. He pitched eight innings for the year, going 0–2 and giving up four runs. Cantillo returned to Akron for the 2022 season. In early August, he was placed on the injured list with a shoulder injury and missed the remainder of the season. Over 14 games (13 starts), he went 4–3 with a 1.93 ERA and 87 strikeouts over 60 2/3 innings.

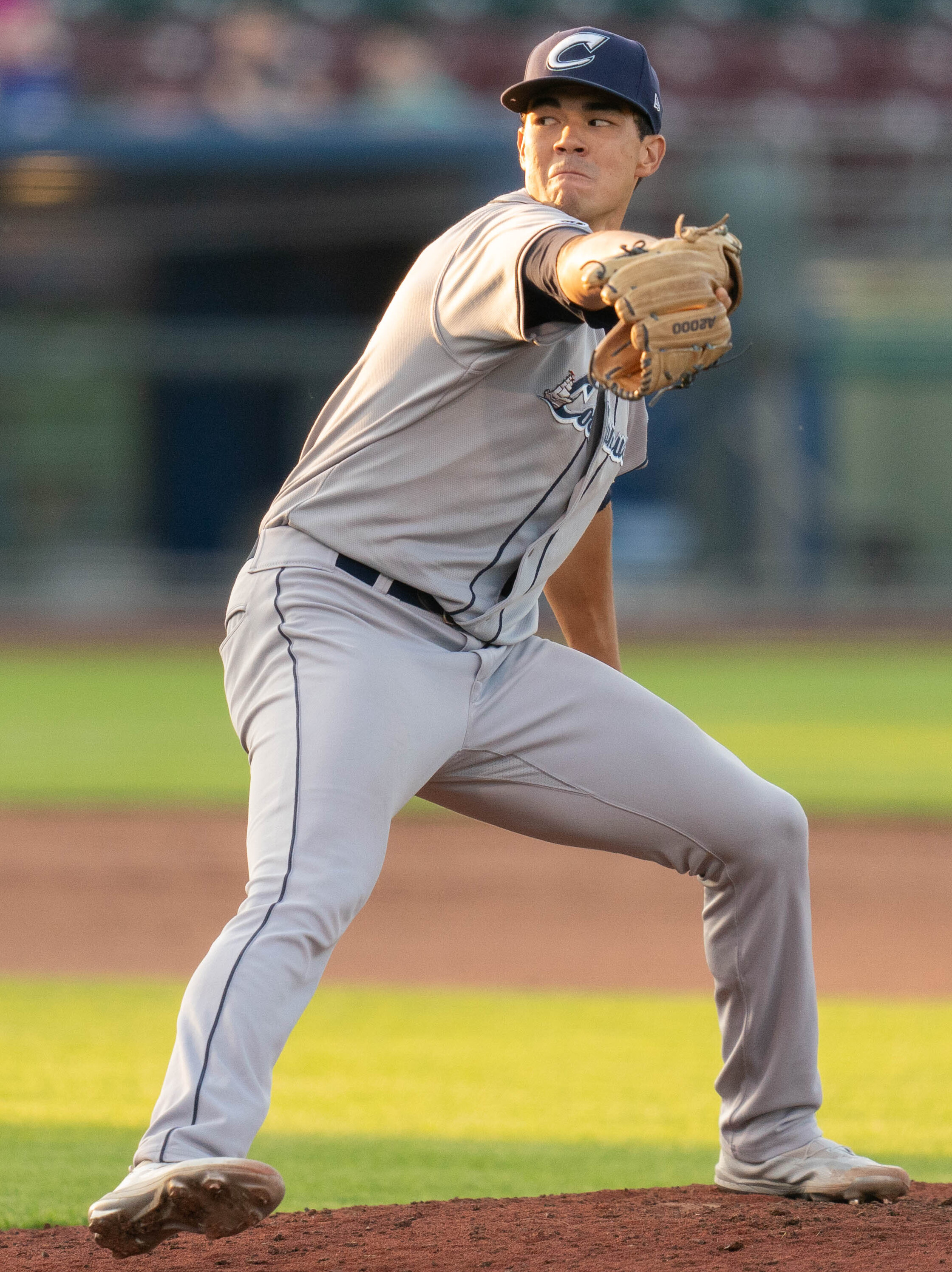
Cantillo with the Columbus Clippers in 2023

On November 15, 2022, the Guardians selected Cantillo's contract and added him to the 40-man roster, protecting him from the Rule 5 draft. He returned to Akron to open the 2023 season. Cantillo was promoted to the Guardians' Triple–A affiliate, the Columbus Clippers, on May 18, 2023. He was selected to represent the Guardians at the 2023 All-Star Futures Game. In 26 games (24 starts) between Akron and Columbus, he posted a combined 7–4 record and 4.07 ERA with 146 strikeouts across 119 1/3 innings of work. Cantillo was optioned to Triple–A Columbus to begin the 2024 season.

On July 28, 2024, Cantillo was promoted to the major leagues for the first time. He made his MLB debut that day as Cleveland's starting pitcher against the Philadelphia Phillies, pitching 3 1/3 innings and giving up three earned runs and three walks while recording three strikeouts. Over nine games (eight starts) for the Guardians in 2024, Cantillo went 2–4 with a 4.89 ERA and 44 strikeouts over 38 2/3 innings.

Cantillo opened the 2025 season in Cleveland's bullpen and was optioned back to Columbus in May, with plans to return as a starter. After starter Luis Ortiz placed on non-disciplinary paid leave by MLB due to an ongoing investigation into gambling-related activities, Cantillo was called up to the Guardians as a starting pitcher on July 3, 2025. He was optioned to Columbus for two-and-a-half weeks in August to continue developing as a starting pitcher, returning to Cleveland on September 3. He finished the 2025 season with 5–3 record with a 3.21 ERA and 108 strikeouts in 34 games. Cantillo became the American League Rookie of the Month in September with a 1.55 ERA and 28 strikeouts in 29 innings across five starts.

Cantillo was named to Cleveland's starting rotation for the 2026 season. He pitched in 33 games (30 starts) for the Guardians and ended the regular season with an 11–9 record, a 3.62 ERA, and 171 strikeouts over 159 innings.

== Personal life ==
Cantillo's father is a naval officer of Italian and Irish descent, and his mother is a nurse of Guyanese descent. He is named after Joe DiMaggio. Cantillo is a Christian.

Awards
Preceded by Roman Anthony	American League Rookie of the Month; September 2025	Succeeded by Kevin McGonigle
