= Tim Herrin =

American baseball player (born 1996)

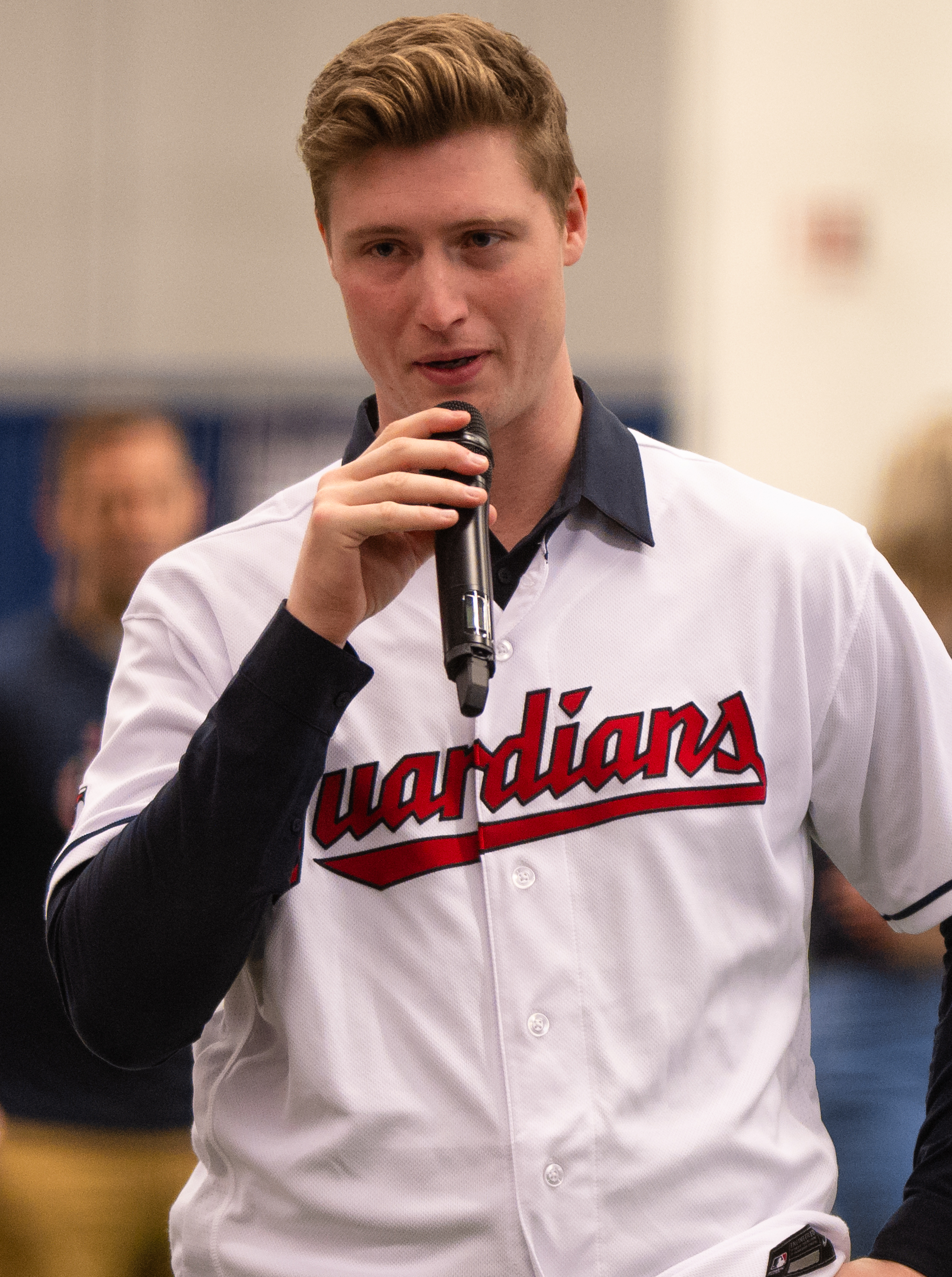
- Herrin with the Cleveland Guardians in 2024

Cleveland Guardians – No. 29
- Pitcher
- Born: October 8, 1996 (age 30); Terre Haute, Indiana, U.S.
- Bats: Left Throws: Left

MLB debut
- April 2, 2023, for the Cleveland Guardians

MLB statistics (through 2026 season)
- Win–loss record: 14–10
- Earned run average: 3.41
- Strikeouts: 199
- Stats at Baseball Reference

Teams
- Cleveland Guardians (2023–present)

Timothy Edward Herrin (born October 8, 1996) is an American professional baseball pitcher for the Cleveland Guardians of Major League Baseball (MLB). He made his MLB debut in 2023.

== Amateur career ==
Herrin attended South Vigo High School in Terre Haute, Indiana, where he played football, basketball and baseball. After graduating in 2015, he enrolled at Indiana University where he played college baseball for three years for the Indiana Hoosiers. During the summer of 2017, he played in the Cape Cod Baseball League for the Harwich Mariners. As a junior in 2018, he appeared in 17 games (making ten starts) and went 6–0 with a 3.22 ERA over 64 1/3 innings.

== Professional career ==
=== Minor leagues ===
The Cleveland Indians selected Herrin in the 29th round of the 2018 Major League Baseball draft. Herrin signed with the Indians and made his professional debut with the Arizona League Indians, going 0–1 with a 6.16 ERA over 19 innings. He opened the 2019 season with the Mahoning Valley Scrappers and was promoted to the Lake County Captains during the season. Over 23 relief appearances between both teams, he went 2–0 with a 2.93 ERA over 43 innings. He did not play minor league game in 2020 due to the cancellation of the minor league season. He returned to play in 2021 with Lake County with whom he went 4–3 with a 2.57 ERA and 85 strikeouts over 73 2/3 innings. He opened the 2022 season with the Akron RubberDucks before being promoted to the Columbus Clippers. Over 46 games (two starts) between the two teams, he went 1–4 with a 4.02 ERA and 101 strikeouts over 69 1/3 innings.

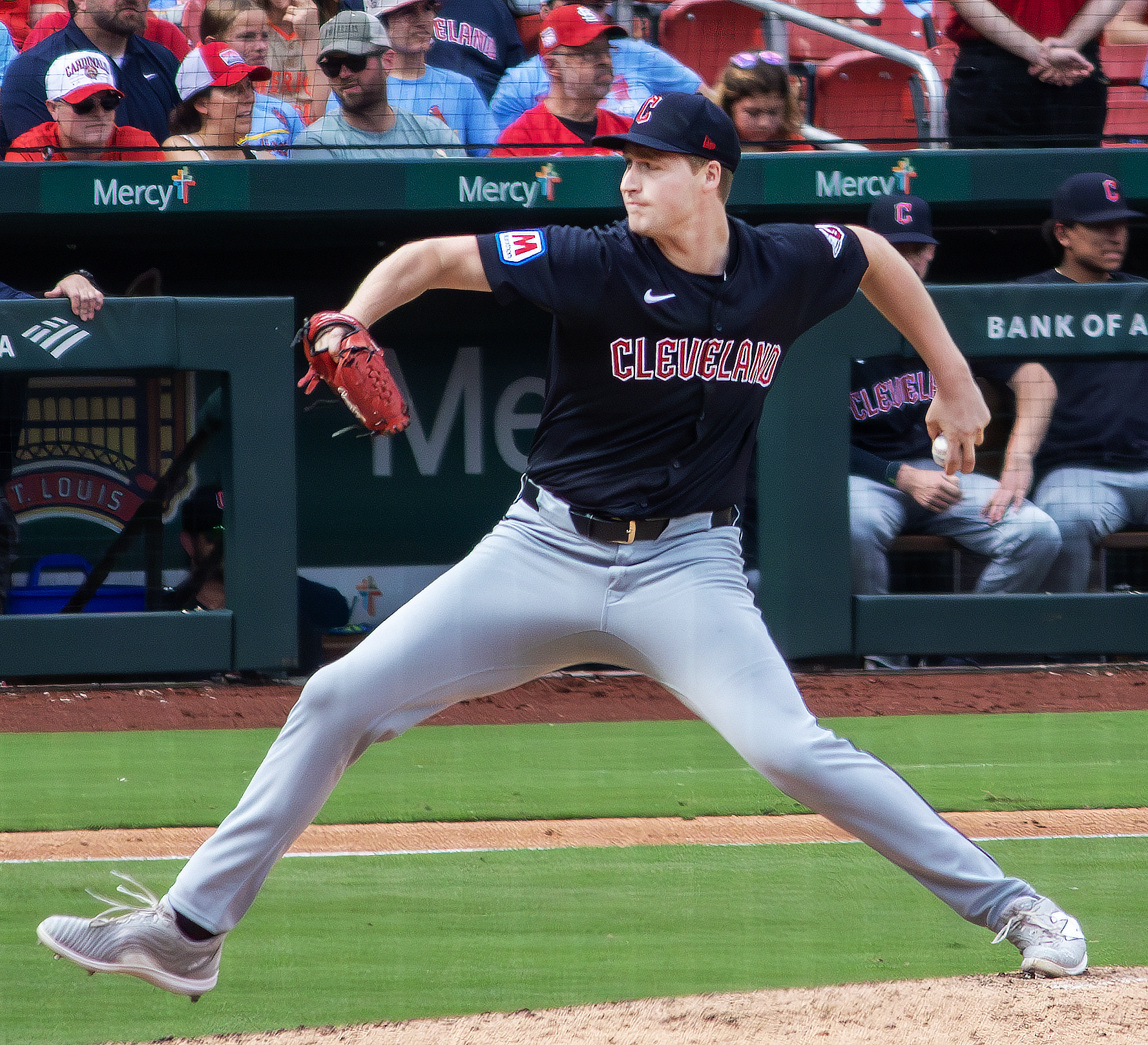
Tim Herrin on the mound in St.Louis, 2024.

=== Major leagues ===
On November 15, 2022, the Guardians selected Herrin's contract and added him to the 40-man roster. Herrin began the 2023 season on the Guardians' major league roster. Herrin made his debut on April 2 against the Seattle Mariners, facing four batters and striking them all out. With this, he became the first pitcher to face at least four batters in his debut and strike all of them out since the mound was moved to its current distance in 1893. Over 23 relief appearances for Cleveland in 2023, Herrin went 1–1 with a 5.53 ERA and 32 strikeouts over 27 2/3 innings. He also played with Columbus during the season, going 7–2 with a 3.38 ERA.

In 2024 for the Guardians, Herrin appeared in 75 games out of the bullpen and went 5–1 with a 1.92 ERA and 68 strikeouts over 65 2/3 innings. Herrin opened the 2025 season in the Cleveland bullpen before he was optioned to Columbus in early July. He was recalled later that month before being optioned once again in early August. On August 17, the Guardians promoted Herrin back to the major leagues. Over 54 relief appearances for the Guardians in 2025, Herrin went 5–4 with a 4.85 ERA and 45 strikeouts across 42 2/3 innings.

Herrin was named to Cleveland's Opening Day roster for the 2026 season. On July 8, he was placed on the injured list with a left elbow contusion after being hit by a line drive. He began a rehab assignment with Columbus on July 18, and returned to the Guardians roster on July 24. Herrin made a total 67 relief appearances for Cleveland and had a 3–4 record, a 3.02 ERA, and 54 strikeouts across 56 2/3 innings.
