= Chris Valaika =

American baseball player and coach (born 1985)

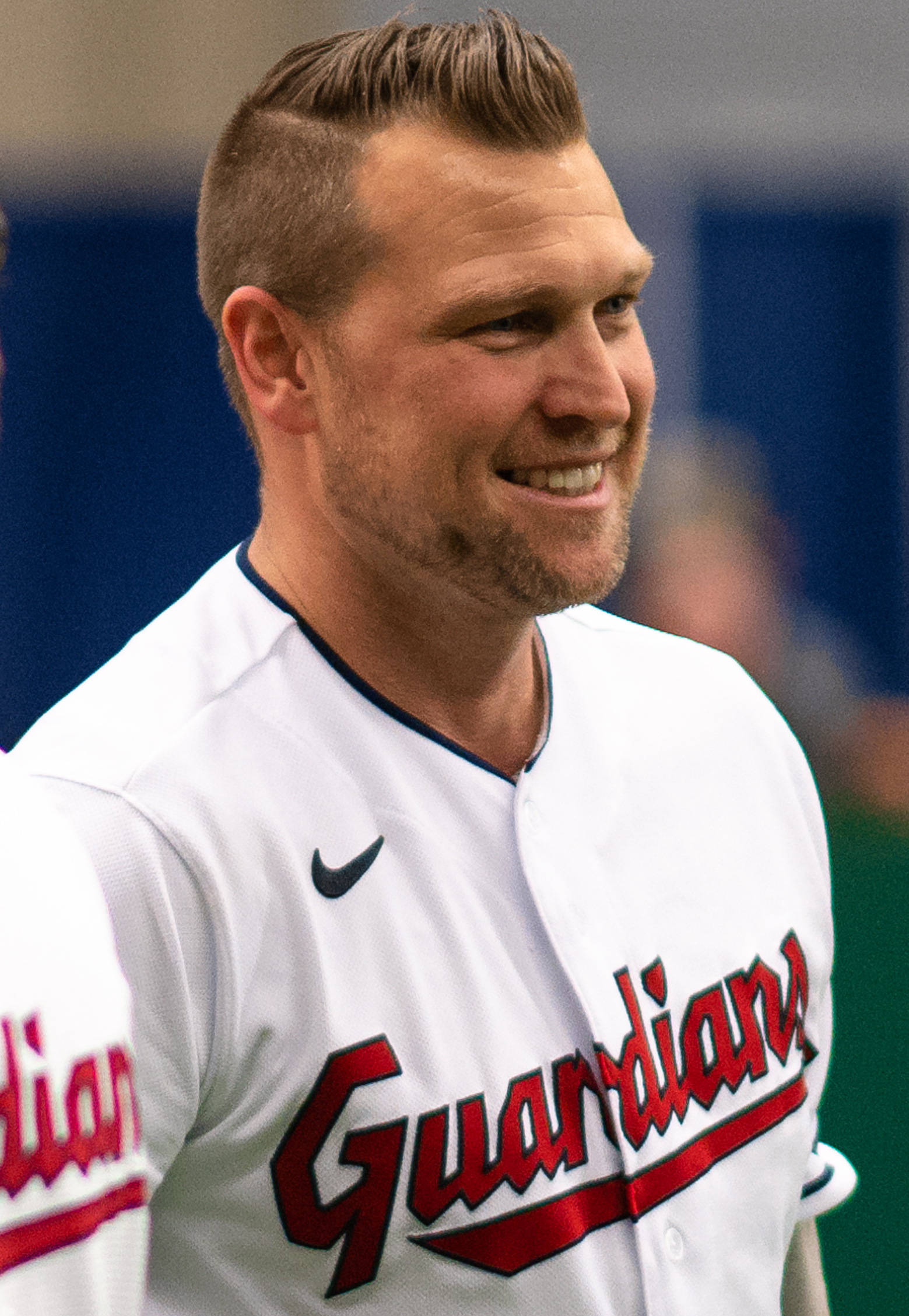
- Valaika with the Cleveland Guardians in 2023

Cincinnati Reds – No. 76
- Infielder / Hitting coach
- Born: August 14, 1985 (age 40); Santa Monica, California, U.S.
- Batted: Right Threw: Right

MLB debut
- August 24, 2010, for the Cincinnati Reds

Last MLB appearance
- September 28, 2014, for the Chicago Cubs

MLB statistics
- Batting average: .238
- Home runs: 5
- Runs batted in: 24
- Stats at Baseball Reference

Teams
- As player: Cincinnati Reds (2010–2011); Miami Marlins (2013); Chicago Cubs (2014); As coach: Chicago Cubs (2021); Cleveland Guardians (2022–2024); Cincinnati Reds (2025–present)
Medals
Men's baseball
Representing United States
World University Baseball Championship
Gold medal – first place	2004 Tainan	Team
World Youth Baseball Championship
Gold medal – first place	2001 Monterrey	Team

Christopher Andrew Valaika (born August 14, 1985) is a former professional baseball infielder and the current hitting coach for the Cincinnati Reds of Major League Baseball (MLB). He played for the Reds, Miami Marlins, and Chicago Cubs. He was formerly an assistant hitting coach for the Cubs.

== Early life and education ==
Valaika was born on August 14, 1985, in Santa Monica, California, to Jeffrey and Ilona Valaika. He is the oldest son of five children. Valaika is an American of Lithuanian descent. Valaika attended Hart High School in Santa Clarita, California, and attended college at the University of California-Santa Barbara. He was a member of the U.S. National Team, and won the silver medal at the U-18 Pan Am Cup in Curacao-Antilles and the gold medal at the 2004 World University Baseball Championship in Taiwan.

== Playing career ==
=== Cincinnati Reds ===
The Cincinnati Reds drafted Valaika in the third round of the 2006 Major League Baseball draft, and he started his pro career with the rookie–level Billings Mustangs. Chris hit .324 with 22 doubles and eight home runs with the Mustangs, and led the Pioneer League in total bases (143)and hits (89); was second in runs scored (58), RBI (60), and games played (70); and third in extra-base hits (34) and at-bats (275). He compiled a Pioneer League record 32-game hit streak, the longest in the Minor Leagues in 2006.

Valaika started 2007 with the Low–A Dayton Dragons, where he had two 11-game hit streaks. He was the Reds' Minor League player of the month for April. His play earned him the starting shortstop for the East Division in the Midwest League All-Star game and a spot on the postseason All-Star team. He was promoted to High–A Sarasota on July 4, where he batted .253 with two home runs and 23 RBI in 57 games.

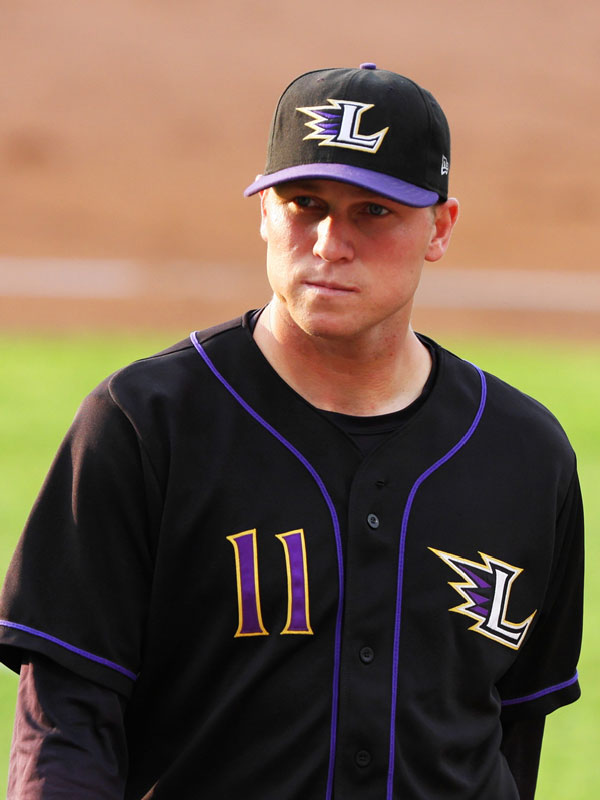
Valaika with the Louisville Bats in 2009

Valaika spent 2008 with Sarasota and the Double–A Chattanooga Lookouts. In a combined 129 games, he batted .317 with 18 home runs, 82 RBI, and nine stolen bases. He led all Reds minor leaguers in average and was second in RBI. His performance again earned him the Reds' Minor League Player of the Month for April. He played for the U.S. in the 2008 All-Star Futures Game, and was a mid-season Florida State League All-Star. He had an 18-game hit streak, which was the second longest in the Southern League. Valaika received the Chief Bender Award for Reds' Minor League Player of the Year in 2008.

He played for the Peoria Javelinas in the Arizona Fall League, where he batted .311 with two doubles, a triple, seven home runs, and 16 RBI in 32 games.

On November 20, 2009, the Reds added Valaika to their 40-man roster to protect him from the Rule 5 Draft.

Valaika made his Major League debut on August 24, 2010. In his first career at-bat, Valaika got his first Major League hit - a single off of Santiago Casilla - on the first pitch he saw.

Valaika was also called up for a brief stint with the Reds in 2011 to fill in for the injured Scott Rolen.

=== Miami Marlins ===
In 2013, Valaika was one of several Miami Marlins players verbally assaulted by hitting coach Tino Martinez, resulting in Martinez's resignation. With the New Orleans Zephyrs, he hit .235, with 7 doubles, 4 homers, 15 RBI, and 1 stolen base. Before his wrist injury, he played 1st base, 2nd base, 3rd base, and shortstop for the Marlins. He hit .219, with 5 doubles, 1 homer, 9 RBI, and no stolen bases when he was up with the Marlins.

He became a free agent on October 1, 2013.

=== Chicago Cubs ===
On November 17, 2013, Valaika agreed to a minor-league deal with an invitation to Spring Training with the Chicago Cubs. Valaika would add depth to third base with minor-league invitee Mat Gamel.

On August 1, 2014, Valaika was called up to the Cubs in the wake of the team trading Emilio Bonifacio and James Russell to the Atlanta Braves. On August 20, 2014, Valaika hit his first home run as a member of the Chicago Cubs. After the season, he was outrighted off the roster. He re-signed with the Cubs after the season.

== Coaching career ==
=== Cleveland Guardians ===
On November 4, 2021, the Cleveland Guardians hired Valaika to serve as their hitting coach, replacing Ty Van Burkleo.

=== Cincinnati Reds ===
On October 24, 2024, Valaika was hired to serve as the hitting coach for the Cincinnati Reds.

== Personal life ==
Valaika's younger brother, Pat Valaika, played for the Colorado Rockies and Baltimore Orioles.
