= 2024 Cleveland Guardians season =

2024 Cleveland Guardians
- American League Central champions
- League: American League
- Division: Central
- Ballpark: Progressive Field
- City: Cleveland, Ohio
- Record: 92–69 (.571)
- Divisional place: 1st
- Owners: Larry Dolan
- President of baseball operations: Chris Antonetti
- General managers: Mike Chernoff
- Manager: Stephen Vogt
- Television: Bally Sports Great Lakes; WKYC (select simulcasts) (Matt Underwood, Rick Manning, Chris Gimenez, Andre Knott)
- Radio: English: WTAM · WMMS (Tom Hamilton, Jim Rosenhaus); Spanish: WARF (Rafa Hernández-Brito, Carlos Baerga)

The 2024 Cleveland Guardians season was the 124th season for the franchise, which competed in the American League of Major League Baseball (MLB). This was the franchise's third season using the name "Guardians" and the first season under manager Stephen Vogt after previous manager Terry Francona stepped down at the conclusion of the previous season. The season opened on March 28, 2024, on the road against the Oakland Athletics and ended on September 29, 2024, at home against the Houston Astros.

On September 19, the Guardians clinched a postseason berth after beating the Minnesota Twins 3–2 in 10 innings on an Andrés Giménez walk-offsingle, becoming the second American League team after the New York Yankees to clinch a 2024 postseason berth. It was their seventh postseason appearance in the past 12 seasons (2013, 2016–2018, 2020, 2022, and 2024). On September 21, the Guardians clinched their 12th American League Central division title following the Kansas City Royals' loss to the San Francisco Giants. It was their second division title in the past three years. Vogt was named AL Manager of the Year for his contributions to the team's regular season success.

Cleveland beat their division rival Detroit Tigers in the American League Division Series in five games to advance to the American League Championship Series for the first time since 2016. In a matchup with the Yankees, the Guardians were defeated in five games.

== Offseason ==
=== Transactions ===
==== October 2023 ====
October 2	Recalled SS Ángel Martínez; LHP Joey Cantillo; 3B Jhonkensy Noel; RHP Michael Kelly; SS Juan Brito; LHP Tim Herrin; RHP Cody Morris; OF George Valera and RHP Hunter Gaddis from Columbus Clippers. Activated LHP Logan Allen from the 15-day IL. Activated C David Fry from the paternity list. Activated SS Gabriel Arias from the 10-day IL.
October 30	Signed international free agent RHP Luilli Cabrera from Dominican Republic to a minor league contract.

==== November 2023 ====
November 2	Claimed 1B Alfonso Rivas off waivers from Pittsburgh Pirates. RHP Reynaldo López – (signed a major league contract with Atlanta Braves on November 20); RF Kole Calhoun; and RHP Lucas Giolito – (signed a major league contract with Boston Red Sox on January 3) elected free agency.
November 3	Selected the contract of OF Johnathan Rodríguez from the Columbus Clippers. Activated OF Johnathan Rodríguez.
November 6	Claimed C Christian Bethancourt off waivers from Tampa Bay Rays. Activated RHP Tanner Bibee from the 60-day IL. Designated C Cam Gallagher for assignment.
November 10	C Cam Gallagher elected free agency.
November 14	Selected the contracts of RHP's Cade Smith from the Columbus Clippers and Daniel Espino from the Akron RubberDucks. Designated RHP's Michael Kelly and Cal Quantrill for assignment. Activated RHP's Cade Smith and Daniel Espino. Signed free agent RHP Adam Oller from the Oakland Athletics to a minor league contract and invited him to spring training.
November 17	Oakland Athletics claimed RHP Michael Kelly off of waivers. Acquired RHP Scott Barlow from the San Diego Padres for RHP Enyel De Los Santos. Acquired C Kody Huff from the Colorado Rockies for RHP Cal Quantrill. Activated RHP's Gavin Williams; Scott Barlow; Tanner Bibee; and SS Brayan Rocchio.

==== December 2023 ====
December 1	New York Yankees claimed RF Oscar González off of waivers. Signed free agent RHP Jaime Barría to a minor league contract and invited him to spring training.
December 6	Drafted 3B Deyvison De Los Santos from the Arizona Diamondbacks in the 2023 Rule 5 draft. Activated 3B Deyvison De Los Santos.
December 10	Acquired cash from the Miami Marlins for C Christian Bethancourt.
December 12	Signed RHP Ben Lively from the Cincinnati Reds to a one-year, $7.5 million contract.
December 15	Signed C Austin Hedges from the Texas Rangers to a one-year, $4 million contract.
December 22	Los Angeles Angels claimed 1B Alfonso Rivas off of waivers.
December 26	Acquired CF Estevan Florial from the New York Yankees for RHP Cody Morris. Activated CF Estevan Florial.

== Season standings ==
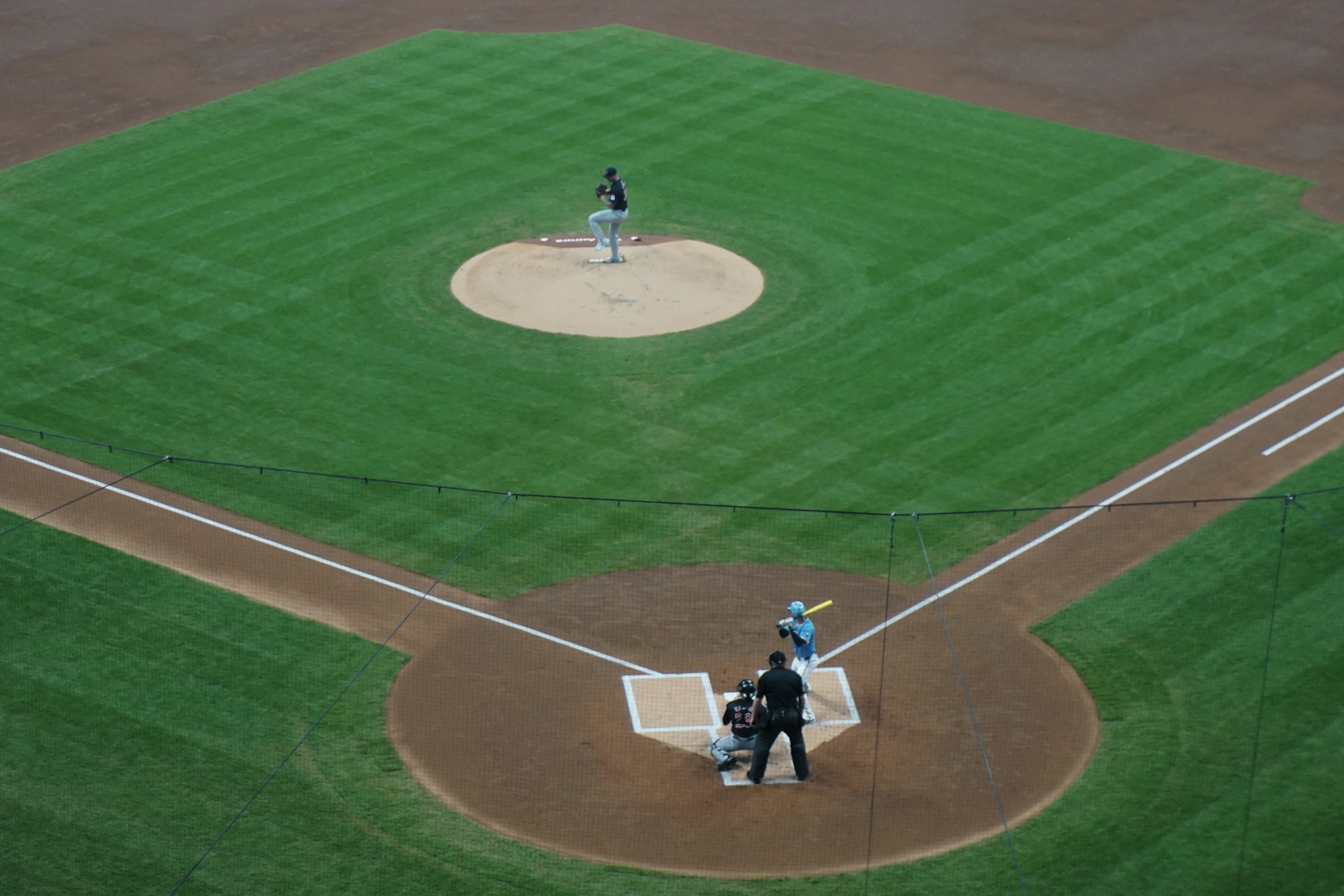
The Guardians playing at Milwaukee on August 18

=== American League Central ===
AL Central
Team	W	L	Pct.	GB	Home	Road
Cleveland Guardians	92	69	.571	—	50‍–‍30	42‍–‍39
Kansas City Royals	86	76	.531	6½	45‍–‍36	41‍–‍40
Detroit Tigers	86	76	.531	6½	43‍–‍38	43‍–‍38
Minnesota Twins	82	80	.506	10½	43‍–‍38	39‍–‍42
Chicago White Sox	41	121	.253	51½	23‍–‍58	18‍–‍63

=== American League Wild Card ===
Division leaders
Team	W	L	Pct.
New York Yankees	94	68	.580
Cleveland Guardians	92	69	.571
Houston Astros	88	73	.547

Wild Card teams (Top 3 teams qualify for postseason)
Team	W	L	Pct.	GB
Baltimore Orioles	91	71	.562	+5
Kansas City Royals	86	76	.531	—
Detroit Tigers	86	76	.531	—
Seattle Mariners	85	77	.525	1
Minnesota Twins	82	80	.506	4
Boston Red Sox	81	81	.500	5
Tampa Bay Rays	80	82	.494	6
Texas Rangers	78	84	.481	8
Toronto Blue Jays	74	88	.457	12
Oakland Athletics	69	93	.426	17
Los Angeles Angels	63	99	.389	23
Chicago White Sox	41	121	.253	45

=== Record vs. opponents ===
==== Record vs. American League ====
2024 American League record Source: MLB Standings Grid – 2024
Team	BAL	BOS	CWS	CLE	DET	HOU	KC	LAA	MIN	NYY	OAK	SEA	TB	TEX	TOR	NL
Baltimore	—	8–5	6–1	3–4	2–4	2–5	4–2	4–2	6–0	8–5	3–3	4–2	9–4	5–2	7–6	20–26
Boston	5–8	—	4–3	2–5	3–4	2–4	4–2	4–2	3–3	6–7	5–1	4–3	6–7	4–2	8–5	21–25
Chicago	1–6	3–4	—	5–8	3–10	2–4	1–12	4–2	1–12	1–5	3–3	1–6	4–2	0–7	1–5	11–35
Cleveland	4–3	5–2	8–5	—	7–6	1–4	5–8	5–1	10–3	2–4	6–1	4–2	3–4	4–2	4–2	24–22
Detroit	4–2	4–3	10–3	6–7	—	2–4	6–7	3–4	6–7	2–4	3–3	5–1	5–1	3–4	5–2	22–24
Houston	5–2	4–2	4–2	4–1	4–2	—	4–3	9–4	2–4	1–6	8–5	5–8	4–2	7–6	5–2	22–24
Kansas City	2–4	2–4	12–1	8–5	7–6	3–4	—	5–2	6–7	2–5	4–2	3–3	3–3	1–5	5–2	23–23
Los Angeles	2–4	2–4	2–4	1–5	4–3	4–9	2–5	—	1–5	3–3	5–8	8–5	3–4	4–9	0–7	22–24
Minnesota	0–6	3–3	12–1	3–10	7–6	4–2	7–6	5–1	—	0–6	6–1	5–2	3–4	5–2	4–2	18–28
New York	5–8	7–6	5–1	4–2	4–2	6–1	5–2	3–3	6–0	—	5–2	4–3	7–6	3–3	7–6	23–23
Oakland	3–3	1–5	3–3	1–6	3–3	5–8	2–4	8–5	1–6	2–5	—	4–9	3–4	6–7	3–3	24–22
Seattle	2–4	3–4	6–1	2–4	1–5	8–5	3–3	5–8	2–5	3–4	9–4	—	3–3	10–3	2–4	26–20
Tampa Bay	4–9	7–6	2–4	4–3	1–5	2–4	3–3	4–3	4–3	6–7	4–3	3–3	—	1–5	9–4	26–20
Texas	2–5	2–4	7–0	2–4	4–3	6–7	5–1	9–4	2–5	3–3	7–6	3–10	5–1	—	2–4	19–27
Toronto	6–7	5–8	5–1	2–4	2–5	2–5	2–5	7–0	2–4	6–7	3–3	4–2	4–9	4–2	—	20–26

Updated with the results of all games through September 30, 2024.

==== Record vs. National League ====
2024 American League record vs. National League Source: MLB Standings
Team	AZ	ATL	CHC	CIN	COL	LAD	MIA	MIL	NYM	PHI	PIT	SD	SF	STL	WSH
Baltimore	2–1	2–1	0–3	3–0	2–1	1–2	1–2	1–2	1–2	2–1	1–2	1–2	1–2	0–3	2–2
Boston	0–3	1–3	2–1	2–1	1–2	0–3	3–0	1–2	0–3	2–1	3–0	1–2	2–1	1–2	2–1
Chicago	1–2	2–1	0–4	0–3	2–1	0–3	1–2	0–3	0–3	0–3	0–3	0–3	1–2	2–1	2–1
Cleveland	0–3	1–2	3–0	3–1	1–2	1–2	2–1	0–3	3–0	2–1	2–1	1–2	2–1	1–2	2–1
Detroit	2–1	0–3	1–2	3–0	2–1	2–1	1–2	1–2	2–1	1–2	2–2	1–2	1–2	2–1	1–2
Houston	2–1	0–3	0–3	0–3	4–0	2–1	3–0	2–1	2–1	1–2	1–2	1–2	1–2	2–1	1–2
Kansas City	1–2	1–2	1–2	3–0	1–2	1–2	2–1	2–1	1–2	1–2	2–1	1–2	0–3	3–1	3–0
Los Angeles	1–2	1–2	1–2	0–3	1–2	2–2	3–0	1–2	2–1	1–2	2–1	3–0	2–1	1–2	1–2
Minnesota	2–1	0–3	1–2	1–2	2–1	1–2	1–2	1–3	1–2	2–1	1–2	1–2	1–2	1–2	2–1
New York	2–1	1–2	2–1	0–3	2–1	1–2	2–1	2–1	0–4	3–0	1–2	2–1	3–0	1–2	1–2
Oakland	1–2	1–2	2–1	2–1	2–1	1–2	2–1	1–2	2–1	2–1	3–0	0–3	2–2	1–2	2–1
Seattle	2–1	2–1	1–2	3–0	2–1	0–3	1–2	1–2	3–0	2–1	1–2	3–1	2–1	2–1	1–2
Tampa Bay	3–0	1–2	2–1	2–1	2–1	1–2	3–1	1–2	3–0	0–3	2–1	1–2	2–1	1–2	2–1
Texas	2–2	1–2	2–1	2–1	0–3	2–1	2–1	0–3	1–2	0–3	2–1	1–2	1–2	1–2	2–1
Toronto	1–2	1–2	1–2	1–2	2–1	1–2	0–3	1–2	1–2	1–3	2–1	2–1	2–1	3–0	1–2

Updated with the results of all games through September 30, 2024.

== Roster ==
2024 Cleveland Guardians
Roster
Pitchers: 41 Logan Allen; 60 Pedro Ávila; 58 Scott Barlow; 46 Tyler Beede; 28 Tanner Bibee; 57 Shane Bieber; 16 Matthew Boyd; 54 Joey Cantillo; 59 Carlos Carrasco; 48 Emmanuel Clase; 35 Alex Cobb; 44 Xzavion Curry; 33 Hunter Gaddis; 61 Connor Gillispie; 26 Anthony Gose; 31 Sam Hentges; 29 Tim Herrin; 54 Spencer Howard; 39 Ben Lively; 56 Darren McCaughan; 24 Triston McKenzie; 49 Eli Morgan; 47 Wes Parsons; 62 Erik Sabrowski; 52 Nick Sandlin; 36 Cade Smith; 34 Peter Strzelecki; 63 Andrew Walters; 32 Gavin Williams	Catchers: 6 David Fry; 27 Austin Hedges; 23 Bo Naylor; Infielders: 13 Gabriel Arias; 0 Andrés Giménez; 9 Kyle Manzardo; 22 Josh Naylor; 11 José Ramírez; 4 Brayan Rocchio; 10 Daniel Schneemann; 8 José Tena	Outfielders: 17 Will Brennan; 90 Estevan Florial; 2 Tyler Freeman; 38 Steven Kwan; 10 Ramón Laureano; 1 Ángel Martínez; 43 Jhonkensy Noel; 30 Johnathan Rodríguez; 7 Myles Straw; 8 Lane Thomas	Manager: 12 Stephen Vogt; Coaches: 55 Craig Albernaz (bench); 15 Sandy Alomar Jr. (first base/catching); 50 Kai Correa (field coordinator); 85 Jason Esposito (run production coordinator); 81 Brad Goldberg (bullpen); 84 J. T. Maguire (outfield/base running); 53 Rouglas Odor (third base/infield); 82 Ricky Pacione (bullpen catcher); 83 Dan Puente (assistant hitting); 72 Eric Rodríguez (bullpen catcher); 86 Joe Torres (assistant pitching); -- Josh Tubbs (hitting analyst); 45 Chris Valaika (hitting); 51 Carl Willis (pitching)

== Regular season ==
=== Game log ===
2024 Game Log: 92–69 (Home: 50–30; Away: 42–39)
March/April: 19–10 (Home: 8–4; Away: 11–6)

#	Date	Opponent	Score	Win	Loss	Save	Attendance	Record	Streak
1	March 28	@ Athletics	8–0	**Bieber** (1–0)	Wood (0–1)	—	13,522	1–0	W1
2	March 29	@ Athletics	6–4	**Allen** (1–0)	Stripling (0–1)	**Clase** (1)	3,837	2–0	W2
3	March 30	@ Athletics	12–3	**Sandlin** (1–0)	Sears (0–1)	—	5,425	3–0	W3
4	March 31	@ Athletics	3–4	Jiménez (1–0)	**Barlow** (0–1)	—	4,118	3–1	L1
5	April 1	@ Mariners	4–5	Hancock (1–0)	**McKenzie** (0–1)	Stanek (1)	21,322	3–2	L2
6	April 2	@ Mariners	5–2	**Bieber** (2–0)	Castillo (0–2)	**Clase** (2)	20,646	4–2	W1
7	April 3	@ Mariners	8–0	**Allen** (2–0)	Kirby (1–1)	—	22,583	5–2	W2
8	April 4	@ Twins	4–2	**Bibee** (1–0)	López (1–1)	**Clase** (3)	35,595	6–2	W3
9	April 6	@ Twins	3–1	**Sandlin** (2–0)	Ryan (0–1)	**Clase** (4)	25,806	7–2	W4
—	April 7	@ Twins	Postponed (rain); Makeup: August 9						
10	April 8	White Sox	4–0	**McKenzie** (1–1)	Banks (0–1)	—	35,735	8–2	W5
11	April 9	White Sox	5–7	Wilson (1–1)	**Barlow** (0–2)	Kopech (2)	14,887	8–3	L1
12	April 10	White Sox	7–6 (10)	**Morgan** (1–0)	Shaw (0–1)	—	12,405	9–3	W1
—	April 12	Yankees	Postponed (rain); Makeup: April 13						
13	April 13 (1)	Yankees	2–3	Schmidt (1–0)	**Carrasco** (0–1)	Holmes (6)	17,089	9–4	L1
14	April 13 (2)	Yankees	2–8	Poteet (1–0)	**McKenzie** (1–2)	—	31,066	9–5	L2
15	April 14	Yankees	8–7 (10)	**Beede** (1–0)	Ferguson (0–2)	—	28,119	10–5	W1
16	April 15	@ Red Sox	6–0	**Herrin** (1–0)	Bernardino (0–1)	—	33,008	11–5	W2
17	April 16	@ Red Sox	10–7 (11)	**Clase** (1–0)	Winckowski (1–1)	**Barlow** (1)	30,133	12–5	W3
18	April 17	@ Red Sox	0–2	Houck (3–1)	**Lively** (0–1)	—	32,024	12–6	L1
19	April 18	@ Red Sox	5–4	**Carrasco** (1–1)	Criswell (0–1)	**Clase** (5)	35,494	13–6	W1
20	April 19	Athletics	10–2	**McKenzie** (2–2)	Boyle (1–3)	—	16,262	14–6	W2
21	April 20	Athletics	6–3	**Allen** (3–0)	Wood (0–2)	**Clase** (6)	19,487	15–6	W3
22	April 21	Athletics	6–2	**Bibee** (2–0)	Stripling (0–5)	—	16,905	16–6	W4
23	April 23	Red Sox	4–1	**Barlow** (1–2)	Houck (3–2)	**Clase** (7)	13,543	17–6	W5
24	April 24	Red Sox	0–8	Criswell (1–1)	**Carrasco** (1–2)	—	13,916	17–7	L1
25	April 25	Red Sox	6–4	**Gaddis** (1–0)	Anderson (0–1)	**Clase** (8)	16,082	18–7	W1
26	April 26	@ Braves	2–6	Sale (3–1)	**Allen** (3–1)	—	40,210	18–8	L1
27	April 27	@ Braves	4–2 (11)	**Barlow** (2–2)	Lee (0–1)	**Sandlin** (1)	41,696	19–8	W1
28	April 28	@ Braves	3–4 (10)	Minter (5–1)	**Clase** (1–1)	—	40,758	19–9	L1
29	April 30	@ Astros	9–10 (10)	Hader (1–2)	**Gaddis** (1–1)	—	29,711	19–10	L2

May: 19–9 (Home: 11–2; Away: 8–7)

#	Date	Opponent	Score	Win	Loss	Save	Attendance	Record	Streak
30	May 1	@ Astros	3–2 (10)	**Smith** (1–0)	Dubin (0–1)	**Clase** (9)	25,733	20–10	W1
31	May 2	@ Astros	2–8	Scott (1–1)	**Allen** (3–2)	—	26,600	20–11	L1
32	May 3	Angels	0–6	Soriano (1–4)	**Bibee** (2–1)	—	19,698	20–12	L2
33	May 4	Angels	7–1	**Lively** (1–1)	Detmers (3–3)	—	26,292	21–12	W1
34	May 5	Angels	4–1	**Carrasco** (2–2)	Canning (1–4)	**Clase** (10)	19,579	22–12	W2
35	May 6	Tigers	2–1	**Sandlin** (3–0)	Flaherty (0–2)	**Clase** (11)	15,029	23–12	W3
36	May 7	Tigers	7–11	Holton (3–0)	**Ávila** (1–1)	—	15,531	23–13	L1
37	May 8	Tigers	5–4 (10)	**Clase** (2–1)	Lange (0–2)	—	20,788	24–13	W1
38	May 9	@ White Sox	2–3	Fedde (3–0)	**Lively** (1–2)	Kopech (4)	10,495	24–14	L1
39	May 10	@ White Sox	3–6	Crochet (3–4)	**Carrasco** (2–3)	Leasure (2)	17,319	24–15	L2
40	May 11	@ White Sox	1–3	Hill (1–0)	**McKenzie** (2–3)	Brebbia (1)	26,152	24–16	L3
41	May 12	@ White Sox	7–0	**Allen** (4–2)	Soroka (0–5)	—	15,529	25–16	W1
42	May 13	@ Rangers	7–0	**Gaddis** (2–1)	Leclerc (3–3)	—	27,100	26–16	W2
43	May 14	@ Rangers	7–4	**Lively** (2–2)	Leiter (0–1)	**Clase** (12)	33,885	27–16	W3
44	May 15	@ Rangers	0–4	Gray (2–1)	**Carrasco** (2–4)	—	29,276	27–17	L1
45	May 17	Twins	3–2	**Herrin** (2–0)	Durán (0–1)	**Clase** (13)	30,121	28–17	W1
46	May 18	Twins	11–4	**Allen** (5–2)	Ober (4–2)	—	35,545	29–17	W2
47	May 19	Twins	5–2	**Clase** (3–1)	Durán (0–2)	—	25,136	30–17	W3
48	May 20	Mets	3–1	**Lively** (3–2)	Megill (0–2)	**Clase** (14)	20,046	31–17	W4
49	May 21	Mets	7–6	**Sandlin** (4–0)	Houser (0–4)	**Clase** (15)	20,977	32–17	W5
50	May 22	Mets	6–3	**Gaddis** (3–1)	Garrett (5–1)	**Smith** (1)	22,322	33–17	W6
51	May 24	@ Angels	10–4	**Allen** (6–2)	Sandoval (2–7)	—	37,618	34–17	W7
52	May 25	@ Angels	4–3	**Bibee** (3–1)	Soriano (2–5)	**Clase** (16)	35,861	35–17	W8
53	May 26	@ Angels	5–4	**Lively** (4–2)	Detmers (3–5)	**Clase** (17)	38,741	36–17	W9
54	May 27	@ Rockies	6–8	Rogers (1–0)	**Curry** (0–1)	Beeks (5)	35,122	36–18	L1
55	May 28	@ Rockies	13–7	**Smith** (2–0)	Lambert (2–4)	—	21,009	37–18	W1
56	May 29	@ Rockies	4–7	Blach (2–2)	**Allen** (6–3)	—	21,374	37–19	L1
57	May 31	Nationals	7–1	**Bibee** (4–1)	Corbin (1–6)	—	35,526	38–19	W1

June: 14–11 (Home: 7–3; Away: 7–8)

#	Date	Opponent	Score	Win	Loss	Save	Attendance	Record	Streak
58	June 1	Nationals	3–2	**Lively** (5–2)	Parker (4–3)	**Clase** (18)	36,725	39–19	W2
59	June 2	Nationals	2–5	Irvin (3–5)	**Carrasco** (2–5)	Finnegan (16)	25,521	39–20	L1
60	June 4	Royals	8–5	**Smith** (3–0)	Long (0–1)	**Clase** (19)	23.260	40–20	W1
—	June 5	Royals	Postponed (rain); Makeup: August 26						
61	June 6	Royals	3–4	Long (1–1)	**Gaddis** (3–2)	McArthur (12)	26,344	40–21	L1
62	June 7	@ Marlins	2–3	Scott (5–4)	**Smith** (3–1)	—	10,718	40–22	L2
63	June 8	@ Marlins	8–0	**Lively** (6–2)	Muñoz (1–2)	**Ávila** (1)	15,669	41–22	W1
64	June 9	@ Marlins	6–3	**Sandlin** (5–0)	Puk (0–7)	—	12,850	42–22	W2
65	June 11	@ Reds	5–3	**McKenzie** (3–3)	Martinez (2–4)	**Clase** (20)	34,103	43–22	W3
66	June 12	@ Reds	2–4	Lodolo (7–2)	**Bibee** (4–2)	Díaz (14)	42,427	43–23	L1
67	June 14	@ Blue Jays	3–1	**Allen** (7–3)	Gausman (5–5)	**Clase** (21)	36,790	44–23	W1
68	June 15	@ Blue Jays	0–5	Francis (3–2)	**Carrasco** (2–6)	—	39,318	44–24	L1
69	June 16	@ Blue Jays	6–7	Berríos (6–5)	**Lively** (6–3)	Pearson (2)	40.043	44–25	L2
70	June 18	Mariners	5–8	Miller (6–5)	**McKenzie** (3–4)	Muñoz (13)	25,453	44–26	L3
71	June 19	Mariners	8–0	**Bibee** (5–2)	Woo (3–1)	—	26,107	45–26	W1
72	June 20	Mariners	6–3	**Allen** (8–3)	Castillo (6–8)	**Clase** (22)	24,470	46–26	W2
73	June 21	Blue Jays	7–1	**Carrasco** (3–6)	Rodríguez (0–2)	—	35,868	47–26	W3
74	June 22	Blue Jays	6–3	**Lively** (7–3)	Berríos (6–6)	**Clase** (23)	37,133	48–26	W4
75	June 23	Blue Jays	6–5	**Herrin** (3–0)	Kikuchi (4–7)	**Clase** (24)	27,479	49–26	W5
76	June 24	@ Orioles	3–2	**Bibee** (6–2)	Povich (0–2)	**Barlow** (2)	20,309	50–26	W6
77	June 25	@ Orioles	10–8	**Ávila** (2–1)	Irvin (6–4)	**Clase** (25)	18,574	51–26	W7
78	June 26	@ Orioles	2–4	Rodriguez (9–3)	**Curry** (0–2)	Kimbrel (17)	17,965	51–27	L1
79	June 27	@ Royals	1–2	Long (2–1)	**Lively** (7–4)	McArthur (14)	23,340	51–28	L2
80	June 28	@ Royals	3–10	Marsh (6–5)	**McKenzie** (3–5)	—	20,691	51–29	L3
81	June 29	@ Royals	7–2	**Bibee** (7–2)	Ragans (5–6)	—	24,153	52–29	W1
82	June 30	@ Royals	2–6	Lugo (11–2)	**Allen** (8–4)	—	27,691	52–30	L1

July: 13–12 (Home: 7–6; Away: 6–6)

#	Date	Opponent	Score	Win	Loss	Save	Attendance	Record	Streak
83	July 2	White Sox	7–6	**Clase** (4–1)	Kopech (2–7)	—	25,654	53–30	W1
84	July 3	White Sox	2–8	Fedde (6–3)	**Williams** (0–1)	—	37,151	53–31	L1
85	July 4	White Sox	8–4	**Lively** (8–4)	Shuster (1–1)	—	29,404	54–31	W1
86	July 5	Giants	2–4	Walker (5–3)	**Bibee** (7–3)	Doval (17)	36,769	54–32	L1
87	July 6	Giants	5–4	**Ávila** (3–1)	Harrison (4–4)	**Clase** (26)	36,081	55–32	W1
88	July 7	Giants	5–4	**Smith** (4–1)	Hjelle (3–3)	**Clase** (27)	32,012	56–32	W2
89	July 8	@ Tigers	0–1	Holton (4–1)	**Barlow** (2–3)	Miller (1)	17,677	56–33	L1
90	July 9	@ Tigers	9–8 (10)	**Barlow** (3–3)	Vest (1–3)	**Clase** (28)	17,111	57–33	W1
91	July 10	@ Tigers	4–5	Olson (4–8)	**Bibee** (7–4)	Foley (15)	16,862	57–34	L1
92	July 11	@ Tigers	1–10	Flaherty (6–5)	**Howard** (1–2)	—	22,399	57–35	L2
93	July 12	@ Rays	0–2	Bradley (4–4)	**Carrasco** (3–7)	Adam (4)	17,290	57–36	L3
94	July 13	@ Rays	4–2	**Sandlin** (6–0)	Cleavinger (5–2)	**Clase** (29)	19,946	58–36	W1
95	July 14	@ Rays	0–2	Pepiot (6–5)	**Lively** (8–5)	Fairbanks (17)	21,875	58–37	L1
**94th All-Star Game: Arlington, TX**
96	July 19	Padres	7–0	**Bibee** (8–4)	Waldron (5–9)	—	37,242	59–37	W1
97	July 20	Padres	0–7	Cease (9–8)	**Williams** (0–2)	—	37,485	59–38	L1
98	July 21	Padres	1–2	King (8–6)	**Lively** (8–6)	Suárez (23)	30,491	59–39	L2
99	July 22	Tigers	2–8	Skubal (11–3)	**Carrasco** (3–8)	—	22,451	59–40	L3
100	July 23	Tigers	5–4	**Smith** (5–1)	Wentz (0–2)	**Clase** (30)	23,277	60–40	W1
101	July 24	Tigers	2–1	**Gaddis** (4–2)	Brieske (1–1)	**Clase** (31)	24,633	61–40	W2
102	July 25	Tigers	0–3	Lucas (1–0)	**Williams** (0–3)	Miller (2)	32,867	61–41	L1
103	July 26	@ Phillies	3–1	**Lively** (9–6)	Sánchez (7–6)	**Clase** (32)	44,448	62–41	W1
104	July 27	@ Phillies	0–8	Phillips (3–0)	**Carrasco** (3–9)	—	44,356	62–42	L1
105	July 28	@ Phillies	4–3	**Herrin** (4–0)	Alvarado (1–5)	**Clase** (33)	43,845	63–42	W1
106	July 29	@ Tigers	8–4	**Bibee** (9–4)	Brieske (1–2)	—	18,387	64–42	W2
107	July 30	@ Tigers	5–0	**Williams** (1–3)	Faedo (5–3)	—	23,239	65–42	W3

August: 12–17 (Home: 9–10; Away: 3–7)

#	Date	Opponent	Score	Win	Loss	Save	Attendance	Record	Streak
108	August 1	Orioles	10–3	**Lively** (10–6)	Rogers (2–10)	—	26,194	66–42	W4
109	August 2	Orioles	8–4	**Smith** (6–1)	Kremer (4–8)	—	35,137	67–42	W5
110	August 3	Orioles	4–7	Eflin (7–7)	**Cantillo** (0–1)	Canó (5)	37,251	67–43	L1
111	August 4	Orioles	5–9	Burnes (12–4)	**Williams** (1–4)	—	33,628	67–44	L2
112	August 5	Diamondbacks	6–7 (10)	Thompson (6–3)	**Clase** (4–2)	Martínez (1)	19,570	67–45	L3
—	August 6	Diamondbacks	Postponed (rain); Makeup: August 7						
113	August 7 (1)	Diamondbacks	3–7	Pfaadt (5–6)	**Lively** (10–7)	—	see 2nd game	67–46	L4
114	August 7 (2)	Diamondbacks	3–5	Rodríguez (1–0)	**Carrasco** (3–10)	Martínez (2)	26,739	67–47	L5
115	August 9 (1)	@ Twins	2–4	Ober (12–5)	**Cantillo** (0–2)	Durán (16)	23,217	67–48	L6
116	August 9 (2)	@ Twins	3–6	Sands (6–1)	**Cobb** (0–1)	Richards (1)	28,605	67–49	L7
117	August 10	@ Twins	2–1	**Williams** (2–4)	Woods Richardson (3–3)	**Clase** (34)	30,314	68–49	W1
118	August 11	@ Twins	5–3	**Bibee** (10–4)	Thielbar (2–3)	**Clase** (35)	30,084	69–49	W2
119	August 12	Cubs	9–8	**Sandlin** (7–0)	Merryweather (1–1)	**Clase** (36)	25,619	70–49	W3
120	August 13	Cubs	2–1	**Ávila** (3–1)	Smyly (3–6)	**Clase** (37)	29,090	71–49	W4
121	August 14	Cubs	6–1	**Cobb** (1–1)	Taillon (8–7)	—	30,243	72–49	W5
122	August 16	@ Brewers	3–5	Civale (4–8)	**Williams** (2–5)	Payamps (6)	30,346	72–50	L1
123	August 17	@ Brewers	1–2	Peralta (8–7)	**Bibee** (10–5)	Williams (4)	37,518	72–51	L2
124	August 18	@ Brewers	0–2	Rea (11–4)	**Lively** (10–8)	Koenig (1)	34,483	72–52	L3
125	August 20	@ Yankees	9–5 (12)	**Herrin** (5–0)	Mayza (0–2)	—	41,426	73–52	W1
126	August 21	@ Yankees	1–8	Cortés Jr. (7–10)	**Cantillo** (0–3)	—	41,263	73–53	L1
127	August 22	@ Yankees	0–6	Cole (5–2)	**Williams** (2–6)	—	38,105	73–54	L2
128	August 23	Rangers	3–5	Eovaldi (9–7)	**Bibee** (10–6)	Yates (23)	33,786	73–55	L3
129	August 24	Rangers	13–5	**Lively** (11–8)	Gray (5–5)	—	33,037	74–55	W1
130	August 25	Rangers	4–2	**Boyd** (1–0)	Bradford (4–2)	**Clase** (38)	28,370	75–55	W2
131	August 26 (1)	Royals	3–4	Schreiber (4–3)	**Gaddis** (4–3)	Erceg (8)	17,738	75–56	L1
132	August 26 (2)	Royals	4–9	Long (3–1)	**Allen** (8–5)	Lynch IV (1)	16,856	75–57	L2
133	August 27	Royals	1–6	McArthur (5–5)	**Williams** (2–7)	—	19,820	75–58	L3
134	August 28	Royals	7–5	**Morgan** (2–0)	Erceg (2–4)	**Clase** (39)	19,722	76–58	W1
135	August 30	Pirates	10–8	**Ávila** (5–1)	Mlodzinski (2–5)	**Clase** (40)	32,132	77–58	W2
136	August 31	Pirates	0–3	Ortiz (6–4)	**Boyd** (1–1)	Chapman (5)	35,747	77–59	L1

September: 15–10 (Home: 8–5; Away: 7–5)

#	Date	Opponent	Score	Win	Loss	Save	Attendance	Record	Streak
137	September 1	Pirates	6–1	**Cobb** (2–1)	Keller (11–9)	—	33,750	78–59	W1
138	September 2	@ Royals	4–2	**Williams** (3–7)	Wacha (11–7)	**Clase** (41)	30,612	79–59	W2
139	September 3	@ Royals	7–1	**Bibee** (11–6)	Singer (9–10)	—	14,813	80–59	W3
140	September 4	@ Royals	1–4	Lugo (15–8)	**Lively** (11–9)	Erceg (9)	14,094	80–60	L1
141	September 6	@ Dodgers	3–1	**Boyd** (2–1)	Knack (2–3)	**Clase** (42)	45,318	81–60	W1
142	September 7	@ Dodgers	2–7	Honeywell Jr. (1–1)	**Williams** (3–8)	—	48,690	81–61	L1
143	September 8	@ Dodgers	0–4	Flaherty (12–6)	**Bibee** (11–7)	—	44,207	81–62	L2
144	September 9	@ White Sox	5–3	**Cantillo** (1–3)	Shuster (1–4)	**Clase** (43)	11,429	82–62	W1
145	September 10	@ White Sox	5–0	**Ávila** (6–1)	Cannon (3–10)	—	12,246	83–62	W2
146	September 11	@ White Sox	6–4	**Sandlin** (8–0)	Martin (0–4)	**Clase** (44)	11,252	84–62	W3
147	September 12	Rays	2–5	Sulser (1–0)	**Williams** (3–9)	Lovelady (2)	19,188	84–63	L1
148	September 13	Rays	1–3	Littell (7–9)	**Bibee** (11–8)	Uceta (3)	24,160	84–64	L2
149	September 14	Rays	6–1	**Cantillo** (2–3)	Alexander (6–5)	—	31,362	85–64	W1
150	September 15	Rays	2–0	**Lively** (12–9)	Bradley (6–11)	**Clase** (45)	21,144	86–64	W2
151	September 16	Twins	4–3	**Walters** (1–0)	Jax (4–5)	**Clase** (46)	17,559	87–64	W3
152	September 17	Twins	1–4	Sands (9–1)	**Williams** (3–10)	Jax (9)	17,391	87–65	L1
153	September 18	Twins	5–4 (10)	**Gaddis** (5–3)	Henriquez (1–1)	—	19,391	88–65	W1
154	September 19	Twins	3–2 (10)	**Morgan** (3–0)	Thielbar (2–4)	—	21,707	89–65	W2
155	September 20	@ Cardinals	5–1	**Lively** (13–9)	Gibson (8–8)	**Sabrowski** (1)	33,967	90–65	W3
156	September 21*	@ Cardinals	5–6	Mikolas (9–11)	**Boyd** (2–2)	Helsley (46)	41,317	90–66	L1
157	September 22	@ Cardinals	1–2	Pallante (8–8)	**Herrin** (5–1)	Helsley (47)	39,100	90–67	L2
158	September 24	Reds	6–1	**Bibee** (12–8)	Spiers (5–7)	—	19,752	91–67	W1
159	September 25	Reds	5–2	**Gaddis** (6–3)	Pagán (4–5)	**Clase** (47)	25,860	92–67	W2
160	September 27	Astros	2–5	Blanco (13–6)	**Cantillo** (2–4)	—	34,149	92–68	L1
161	September 28	Astros	3–4	Verlander (5–6)	**Lively** (13–10)	Dubin (2)	33,609	92–69	L2
–	September 29	Astros	Canceled (rain)						

Legend: = Win = Loss = Postponement = Clinched playoff spot = Clinched division
Bold = Guardians team member

== Postseason ==
=== Game log ===
2024 Postseason Game Log: 4–6 (Home: 3–3; Away: 1–3)
American League Division Series: 3–2 (Home: 2–1; Away: 1–1)

#	Date	Opponent	Score	Win	Loss	Save	Attendance	Series
1	October 5	Tigers	7–0	Smith (1–0)	Holton (0–1)	—	33,548	1–0
2	October 7	Tigers	0–3	Vest (1–0)	Clase (0–1)	Brieske (2)	33,650	1–1
3	October 9	@ Tigers	0–3	Hurter (1–0)	Cobb (0–1)	Holton (1)	44,885	1–2
4	October 10	@ Tigers	5–4	Gaddis (1–0)	Brieske (0–1)	Clase (1)	44,923	2–2
5	October 12	Tigers	7–3	Herrin (1–0)	Skubal (1–1)	Clase (2)	34,105	3–2

American League Championship Series: 1–4 (Home: 1–2; Away: 0–2)

#	Date	Opponent	Score	Win	Loss	Save	Attendance	Series
1	October 14	@ Yankees	2–5	Rodón (1–1)	Cobb (0–2)	Weaver (4)	47,264	0–1
2	October 15	@ Yankees	3–6	Holmes (2–0)	Bibee (0–1)	—	47,054	0–2
3	October 17	Yankees	7–5 (10)	Ávila (1–0)	Holmes (2–1)	—	32,531	1–2
4	October 18	Yankees	6–8	Leiter Jr. (1–0)	Clase (0–2)	Kahnle (1)	35,263	1–3
5	October 19	Yankees	2–5 (10)	Weaver (1–0)	Gaddis (1–1)	—	32,545	1–4

=== Postseason rosters ===
Playoff rosters
American League Division Series

- Pitchers: 16 Matthew Boyd 28 Tanner Bibee 29 Tim Herrin 32 Gavin Williams 33 Hunter Gaddis 35 Alex Cobb 36 Cade Smith 48 Emmanuel Clase 49 Eli Morgan 54 Joey Cantillo 62 Erik Sabrowski 63 Andrew Walters
- Catchers: 6 David Fry 23 Bo Naylor 27 Austin Hedges
- Infielders: 0 Andrés Giménez 4 Brayan Rocchio 9 Kyle Manzardo 10 Daniel Schneemann 11 José Ramírez 22 Josh Naylor
- Outfielders: 1 Ángel Martínez (Games 2–5) 2 Tyler Freeman (Game 1) 8 Lane Thomas 17 Will Brennan 38 Steven Kwan 43 Jhonkensy Noel

American League Championship Series

- Pitchers: 16 Matthew Boyd 28 Tanner Bibee 29 Tim Herrin 32 Gavin Williams 33 Hunter Gaddis 35 Alex Cobb (Game 1) 36 Cade Smith 39 Ben Lively (Games 2–5) 48 Emmanuel Clase 49 Eli Morgan 54 Joey Cantillo 60 Pedro Ávila 62 Erik Sabrowski 63 Andrew Walters
- Catchers: 6 David Fry 23 Bo Naylor 27 Austin Hedges
- Infielders: 0 Andrés Giménez 4 Brayan Rocchio 9 Kyle Manzardo 10 Daniel Schneemann 11 José Ramírez 22 Josh Naylor
- Outfielders: 8 Lane Thomas 17 Will Brennan 38 Steven Kwan 43 Jhonkensy Noel

== Player stats ==
= Indicates team leader

= Indicates league leader

=== Batting ===
Note: G = Games played; AB = At bats; R = Runs scored; H = Hits; 2B = Doubles; 3B = Triples; HR = Home runs; RBI = Runs batted in; AVG = Batting average; SB = Stolen bases

Player	G	AB	R	H	2B	3B	HR	RBI	AVG	SB
Gabriel Arias	53	153	15	34	9	1	3	15	.222	5
Pedro Ávila	1	0	0	0	0	0	0	0	—	0
Will Brennan	114	330	37	87	13	2	8	30	.264	4
Estevan Florial	36	98	11	17	6	2	3	11	.173	2
Tyler Freeman	118	330	48	69	14	1	7	32	.209	11
David Fry	122	335	44	88	18	1	14	51	.263	4
Hunter Gaddis	1	0	0	0	0	0	0	0	—	0
Andrés Giménez	152	583	64	147	22	1	9	63	.252	30
Austin Hedges	66	132	12	20	3	0	2	15	.152	2
Spencer Howard	1	0	0	0	0	0	0	0	—	0
Steven Kwan	122	480	83	140	16	3	14	44	.292	12
Ramón Laureano	31	70	7	10	3	0	1	4	.143	3
Kyle Manzardo	53	145	11	34	12	0	5	15	.234	0
Ángel Martínez	43	151	16	35	7	0	3	11	.232	3
Bo Naylor	123	354	39	71	10	2	13	39	.201	6
Josh Naylor	152	563	84	137	27	0	31	108	.243	6
Jhonkensy Noel	67	179	25	39	7	1	13	28	.218	0
José Ramírez	158	620	114	173	39	2	39	118	.279	41
Brayan Rocchio	143	383	50	79	18	0	8	36	.206	10
Johnathan Rodríguez	13	31	6	4	1	0	0	5	.129	0
Daniel Schneemann	73	193	17	42	10	2	5	22	.218	3
Myles Straw	7	4	2	1	0	0	0	0	.250	2
José Tena	3	4	0	0	0	0	0	0	.000	0
Lane Thomas	53	172	23	36	10	0	7	23	.209	4
Team totals	161	5310	708	1263	245	18	185	670	.238	148

Source:Baseball Reference

=== Pitching ===
Note: W = Wins; L = Losses; ERA = Earned run average; G = Games pitched; GS = Games started; SV = Saves; IP = Innings pitched; H = Hits allowed; R = Runs allowed; ER = Earned runs allowed; BB = Walks allowed; K = Strikeouts

Player	W	L	ERA	G	GS	SV	IP	H	R	ER	BB	K
Logan Allen	8	5	5.73	20	20	0	97.1	113	63	62	41	79
Pedro Avila	5	1	3.25	50	0	1	74.2	68	30	27	30	73
Scott Barlow	3	3	4.25	63	0	2	55.0	44	27	26	31	68
Tyler Beede	1	0	8.36	13	0	0	14.0	16	14	13	9	18
Tanner Bibee	12	8	3.47	31	31	0	173.2	150	70	67	44	187
Shane Bieber	2	0	0.00	2	2	0	12.0	10	0	0	1	20
Matthew Boyd	2	2	2.72	8	8	0	39.2	32	16	12	13	46
Joey Cantillo	2	4	4.89	9	8	0	38.2	35	22	21	15	44
Carlos Carrasco	3	10	5.64	21	21	0	103.2	112	68	65	33	89
Emmanuel Clase	4	2	0.61	74	0	47	74.1	39	10	5	10	66
Alex Cobb	2	1	2.76	3	3	0	16.1	14	7	5	3	10
Xzavion Curry	0	2	5.84	7	4	0	24.2	29	17	16	5	15
Hunter Gaddis	6	3	1.57	78	0	0	74.2	43	15	13	14	66
Connor Gillispie	0	0	2.25	3	0	0	8.0	4	2	2	5	8
Anthony Gose	0	0	10.38	3	0	0	4.1	9	5	5	1	4
Austin Hedges	0	0	0.00	1	0	0	2.0	0	0	0	1	0
Sam Hentges	0	0	3.04	25	0	0	23.2	18	8	8	5	27
Tim Herrin	5	1	1.92	39	0	0	75	65.2	17	14	25	68
Spencer Howard	0	1	9.00	2	1	0	5.0	11	8	5	3	6
Ben Lively	13	10	3.81	29	29	0	151.0	139	67	64	49	118
Darren McCaughan	0	0	9.00	2	0	0	6.0	9	6	6	6	1
Triston McKenzie	3	5	5.11	16	16	0	75.2	69	46	43	49	74
Eli Morgan	3	0	1.93	32	0	0	42.0	30	11	9	11	34
Wes Parsons	0	0	0.00	2	0	0	4.0	4	0	0	0	5
Erik Sabrowski	0	0	0.00	8	0	1	12.2	6	0	0	4	19
Nick Sandlin	8	0	3.75	68	1	1	57.2	46	29	24	27	68
Cade Smith	6	1	1.91	74	0	1	75.1	51	16	16	17	103
Peter Strzelecki	0	0	2.31	10	0	0	11.2	11	3	3	3	9
Andrew Walters	1	0	0.00	9	1	0	8.2	1	1	0	5	6
Gavin Williams	3	10	4.86	16	16	0	76.0	72	42	41	32	79
Team totals	92	69	3.61	161	161	53	1428.0	1224	621	572	492	1410

Source:Baseball Reference

== Postseason stats ==
=== Batting ===
Note: G = Games played; AB = At bats; R = Runs scored; H = Hits; 2B = Doubles; 3B = Triples; HR = Home runs; RBI = Runs batted in; AVG = Batting average; SB = Stolen bases

Player	G	AB	R	H	2B	3B	HR	RBI	AVG	SB
Will Brennan	7	12	0	2	1	0	0	1	.167	0
David Fry	10	28	4	8	1	0	2	8	.286	1
Andrés Giménez	10	37	4	8	2	0	0	1	.216	2
Austin Hedges	8	11	0	1	1	0	0	0	.091	0
Steven Kwan	10	42	10	16	1	0	0	2	.381	2
Kyle Manzardo	9	19	2	6	1	0	1	2	.316	0
Ángel Martínez	1	1	0	0	0	0	0	0	.000	0
Bo Naylor	10	22	2	4	2	0	0	1	.182	0
Josh Naylor	10	40	2	9	2	0	0	5	.225	0
Jhonkensy Noel	9	21	2	2	0	0	1	2	.095	0
José Ramírez	10	35	5	7	3	0	2	6	.200	2
Brayan Rocchio	10	33	4	11	2	0	1	2	.333	0
Daniel Schneemann	3	7	0	0	0	0	0	0	.000	0
Lane Thomas	10	36	4	8	1	0	2	9	.222	1
Team totals	10	344	38	82	18	0	9	38	.238	8

=== Pitching ===
Note: W = Wins; L = Losses; ERA = Earned run average; G = Games pitched; GS = Games started; SV = Saves; IP = Innings pitched; H = Hits allowed; R = Runs allowed; ER = Earned runs allowed; BB = Walks allowed; K = Strikeouts

Player	W	L	ERA	G	GS	SV	IP	H	R	ER	BB	K
Pedro Avila	1	0	0.00	3	0	0	4.0	0	0	0	2	3
Tanner Bibee	0	1	3.45	4	4	0	15.2	19	7	6	4	16
Matthew Boyd	0	0	0.77	3	2	0	11.2	7	1	1	6	14
Joey Cantillo	0	0	3.86	3	0	0	2.1	0	1	1	4	3
Emmanuel Clase	0	2	9.00	7	0	2	8.0	12	8	8	1	8
Alex Cobb	0	2	7.94	2	2	0	5.2	8	5	5	4	5
Hunter Gaddis	1	1	4.91	8	0	0	7.1	8	6	4	5	12
Tim Herrin	1	0	1.08	9	0	0	8.1	6	1	1	5	6
Ben Lively	0	0	0.00	1	0	0	1.1	1	0	0	1	2
Eli Morgan	0	0	2.25	6	0	0	4.0	2	2	1	2	6
Erik Sabrowski	0	0	1.69	5	0	0	5.1	4	2	1	3	8
Cade Smith	1	0	3.60	9	0	0	10.0	5	4	4	2	16
Andrew Walters	0	0	3.00	4	0	0	3.0	1	1	1	2	4
Gavin Williams	0	0	11.57	1	1	0	2.1	3	3	3	0	4
Team totals	4	6	3.68	10	10	2	88.0	76	42	36	41	107

== Farm system ==
Level	Team	League	Manager
AAA	Columbus Clippers	International League	Andy Tracy
AA	Akron RubberDucks	Eastern League	Greg DiCenzo
High-A	Lake County Captains	Midwest League	Omir Santos
Low–A	Lynchburg Hillcats	Carolina League	Jordan Smith
Rookie	ACL Guardians	Arizona Complex League	Yan Rivera
Rookie	DSL Guardians Goryl	Dominican Summer League	Juan De La Cruz
Rookie	DSL Guardians Mendoza	Dominican Summer League	Jonathan López
