= Brayan Rocchio =

Venezuelan baseball player (born 2001)

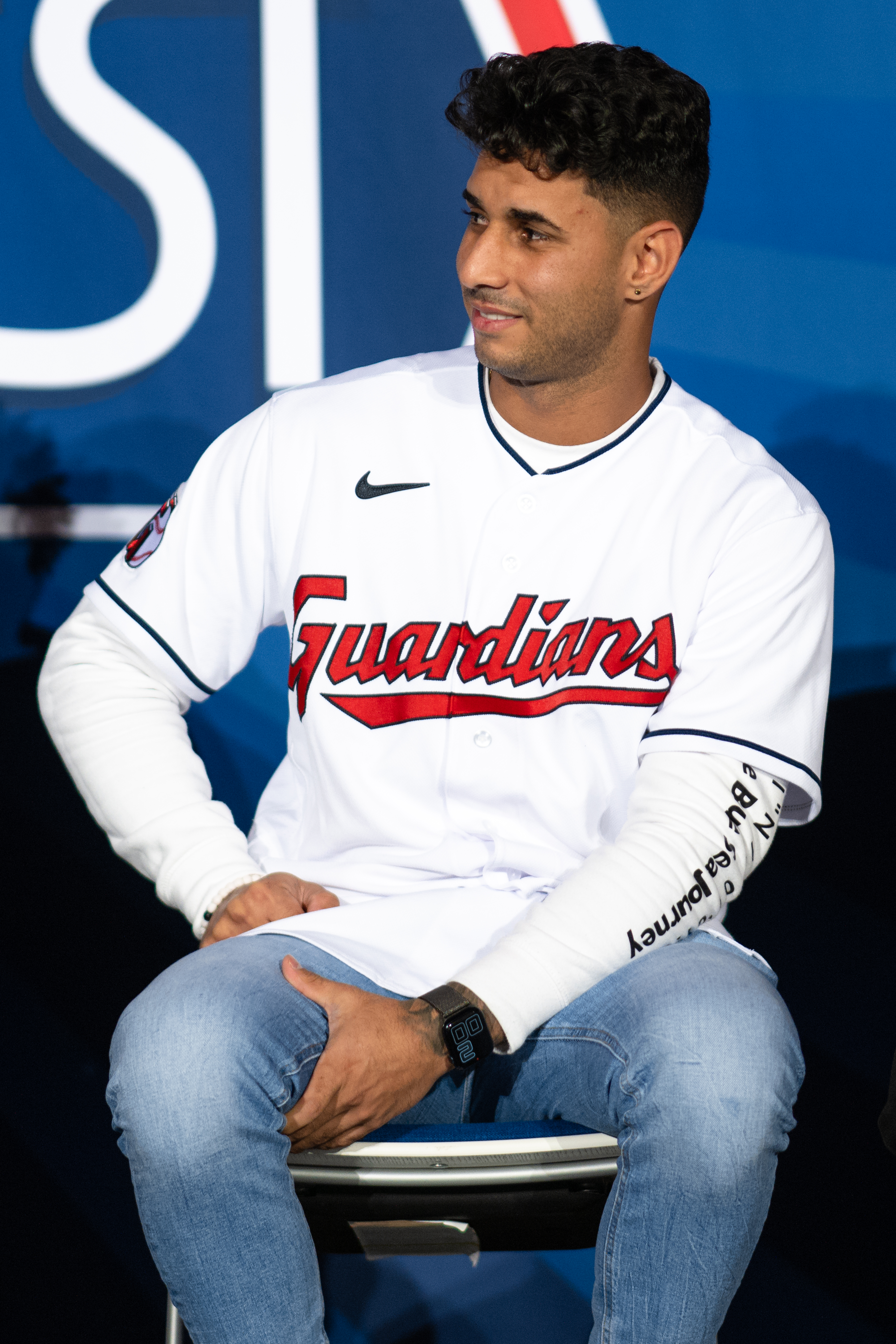
- Rocchio with the Cleveland Guardians in 2023

Cleveland Guardians – No. 4
- Shortstop
- Born: January 13, 2001 (age 25); Caracas, Venezuela
- Bats: Switch Throws: Right

MLB debut
- May 16, 2023, for the Cleveland Guardians

MLB statistics (through 2026 season)
- Batting average: .234
- Home runs: 28
- Runs batted in: 161
- Stats at Baseball Reference

Teams
- Cleveland Guardians (2023–present)

Brayan Hommy Rocchio Zambrano (born January 13, 2001) is a Venezuelan professional baseball shortstop for the Cleveland Guardians of Major League Baseball (MLB). He made his MLB debut in 2023.

== Career ==
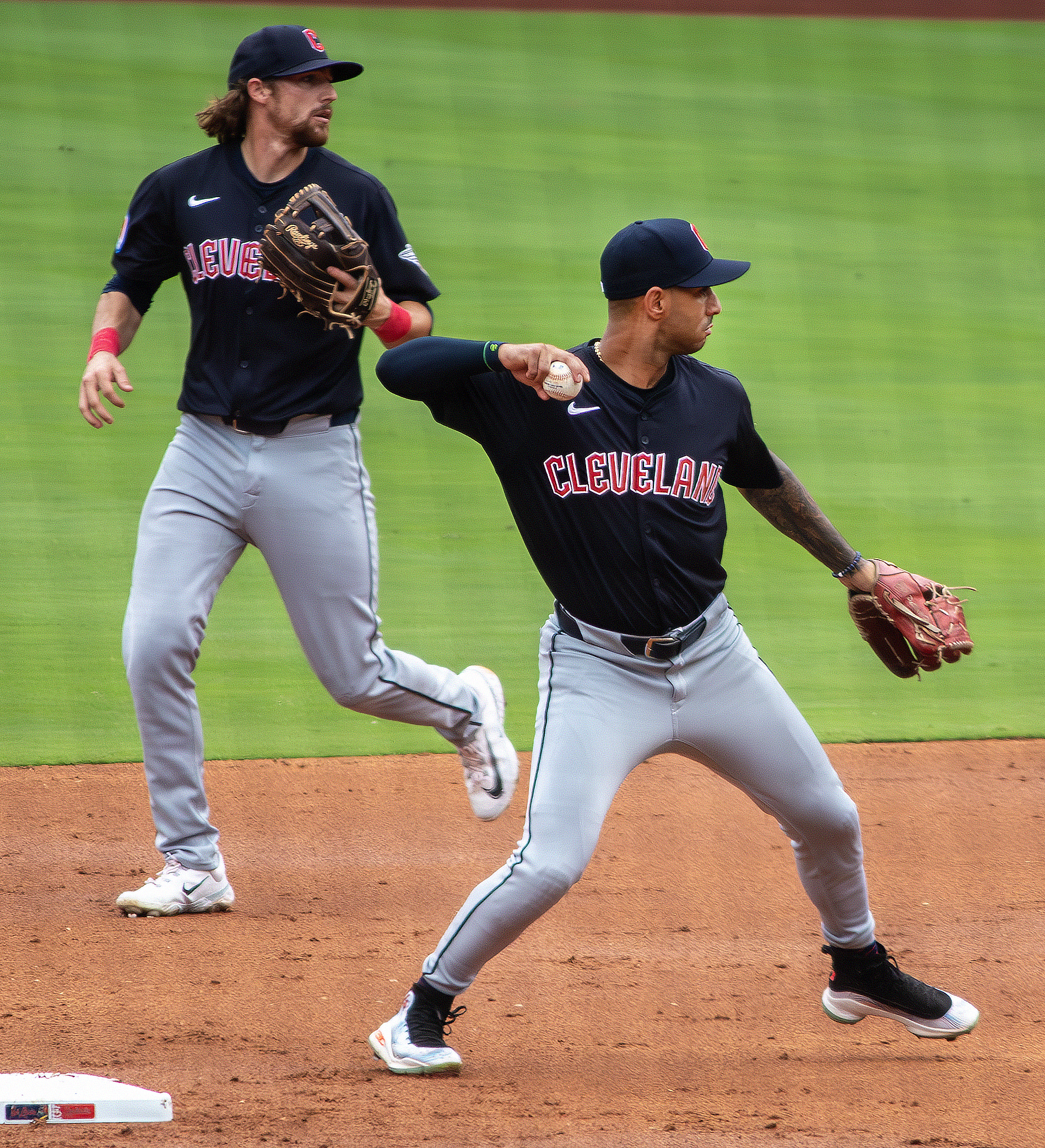
Rocchio (right) with Daniel Schneemann (left) in 2024

Rocchio was signed as an international free agent by the Cleveland Indians on July 2, 2017. He made his professional debut with the Dominican Summer League Indians in 2018.

Rocchio was promoted to the Arizona League Indians after hitting .323 in 25 games for the DSL Indians. He had an even better season with the AZL Indians, hitting for a .343 batting average in 35 games. Across both leagues in his first professional season, Rocchio hit .335 in 60 games. For his 2019 season, he played the full season with the Low-A Mahoning Valley Scrappers. Rocchio played in 69 games, hitting for a .250 batting average. Rocchio did not play in a game in 2020 due to the cancellation of the minor league season because of the COVID-19 pandemic.

Rocchio returned to action in 2021 with the High–A Lake County Captains and Double–A Akron RubberDucks, batting .277/.346/.460 with 15 home runs, 63 RBI, and 21 stolen bases across 108 total games. The newly named Cleveland Guardians selected Rocchio to their 40–man roster on November 19, 2021. Rocchio split the 2022 season between Akron and the Triple–A Columbus Clippers, slashing a combined .257/.336/.420 with 18 home runs, 64 RBI, and 14 stolen bases over 132 appearances. Rocchio was optioned to Triple-A Columbus to begin the 2023 season.

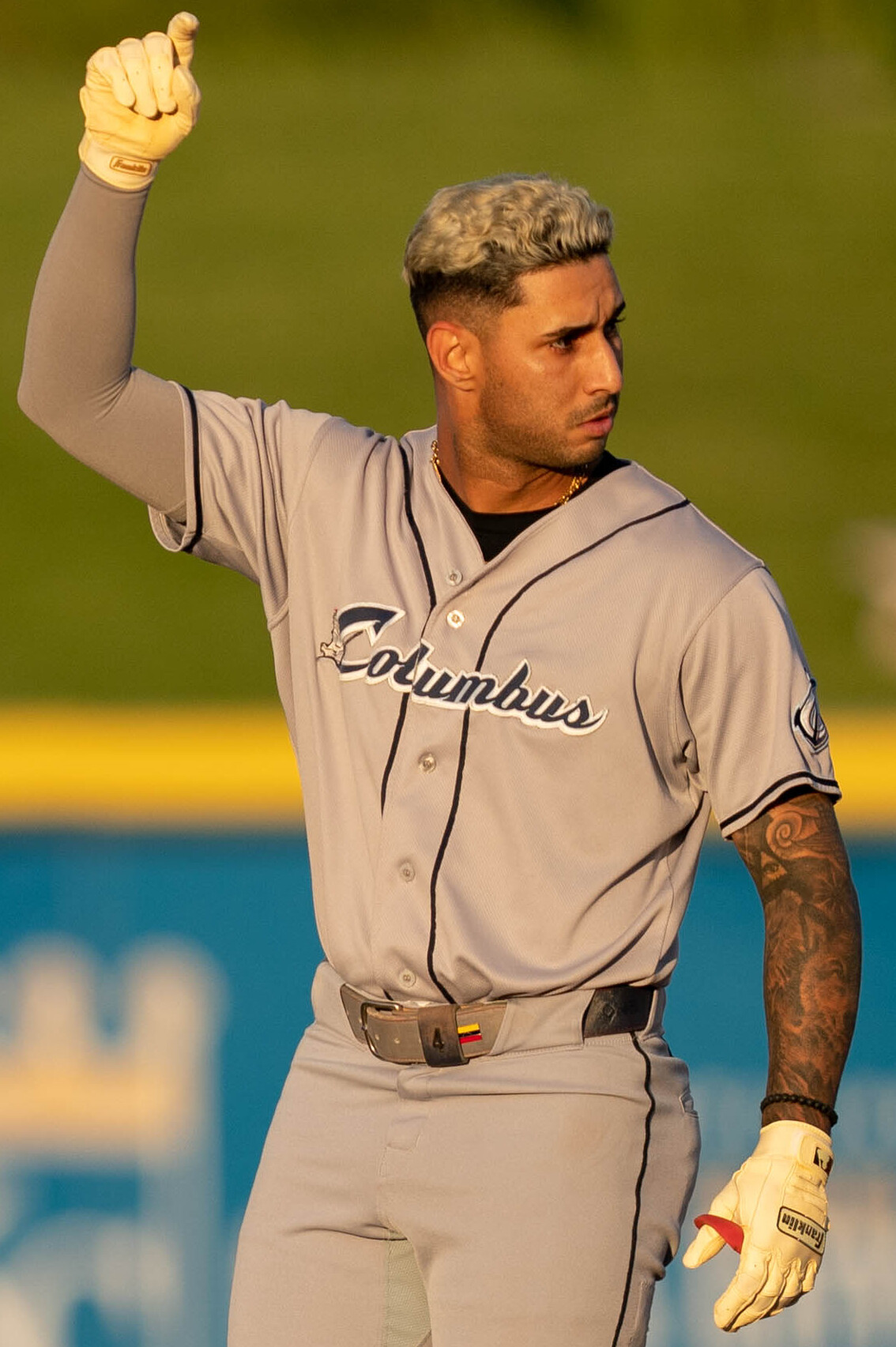
Rocchio with Triple-A Columbus in 2025

On April 19, 2023, Rocchio was promoted to the major leagues for the first time. He did not see game action for the Guardians and was optioned back to Columbus the following day, becoming a phantom ballplayer. On May 16, Rocchio was again promoted to the major leagues after José Ramírez was placed on the bereavement list. Rocchio made his major league debut that day. He made 23 appearances for the team during his rookie campaign, hitting .247/.279/.321 with eight RBI.

Rocchio was Cleveland's Opening Day starting shortstop in 2024. Rocchio made 143 appearances for Cleveland during the regular season, batting .206/.298/.316 with eight home runs, 36 RBI, and 10 stolen bases. Despite his shortcomings at the plate, Rocchio displayed solid defense throughout the year. In the playoffs, he hit .333/.421/.485 in 10 games. The Guardians lost to the New York Yankees in five games despite Rocchio's efforts. However, he started off 2025 slowly and was demoted to Triple-A in May. Rocchio returned to the Guardians on July 1. On September 28, Rocchio hit a walk-off three-run home run in the 10th inning against the Texas Rangers to end the final game of the regular season. In 115 contests for the Guardians, he slashed .233/.290/.340 with five home runs and 44 RBI.

On September 4, 2026, in a game against the Detroit Tigers, Rocchio hit a grand slam off of Keider Montero while batting left–handed. Later in the same game, Rocchio hit a walk–off solo homer off of Drew Sommers from the right side of the plate. In doing so, Rocchio became the sixth player in MLB history to hit a walk–off homer and grand slam in the same game, joining George Kelly (1924), Hank Greenberg (1938), Minnie Miñoso (1960), Otto Vélez (1980), and Jack Clark (1991). Rocchio made 153 appearances for Cleveland during the regular season, batting .253/.313/.391 with career–highs in home runs (15), RBI (73), and stolen bases (20).

== International career ==
Rocchio appeared for Italy in the 2026 World Baseball Classic.
