= Andrew Walters (baseball) =

American baseball player (born 2000)

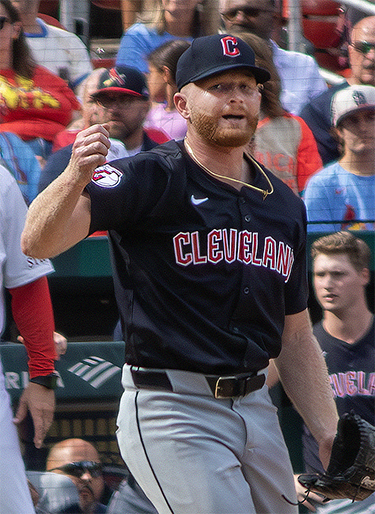
- Walters with the Cleveland Guardians

Cleveland Guardians – No. 91
- Pitcher
- Born: December 8, 2000 (age 25); Palm Bay, Florida, U.S.
- Bats: Right Throws: Right

MLB debut
- September 12, 2024, for the Cleveland Guardians

MLB statistics (through 2025 season)
- Win–loss record: 1–0
- Earned run average: 1.80
- Strikeouts: 8
- Stats at Baseball Reference

Teams
- Cleveland Guardians (2024–2025)

Andrew Wayne Walters (born December 8, 2000) is an American professional baseball pitcher for the Cleveland Guardians of Major League Baseball (MLB).

== Amateur career ==
Walters grew up in Palm Bay, Florida and attended Bayside High School.

Walters began his college baseball career at Eastern Florida State College (EFSC) and played one season, which was cut short due to COVID-19 and did not count towards his collegiate eligibility. In 2021, he played collegiate summer baseball with the Wareham Gatemen of the Cape Cod Baseball League. He transferred to Miami after his one season at EFSC. Walters made 19 appearances and had a 1.46 ERA with 36 strikeouts and nine walks in his first season with the Hurricanes. He was named Miami's closer entering his redshirt sophomore season and was named first-team All-Atlantic Coast Conference (ACC) after leading the conference with 14 saves. Walters was selected in the 18th round of the 2022 Major League Baseball draft by the Baltimore Orioles, but opted to return to Miami for his redshirt junior season. He was named a consensus first-team All-American in 2023 after finishing the season with a 4–0 record, 12 saves, and 1.21 ERA with 72 strikeouts in 44 2/3 innings pitched over 28 appearances.

== Professional career ==
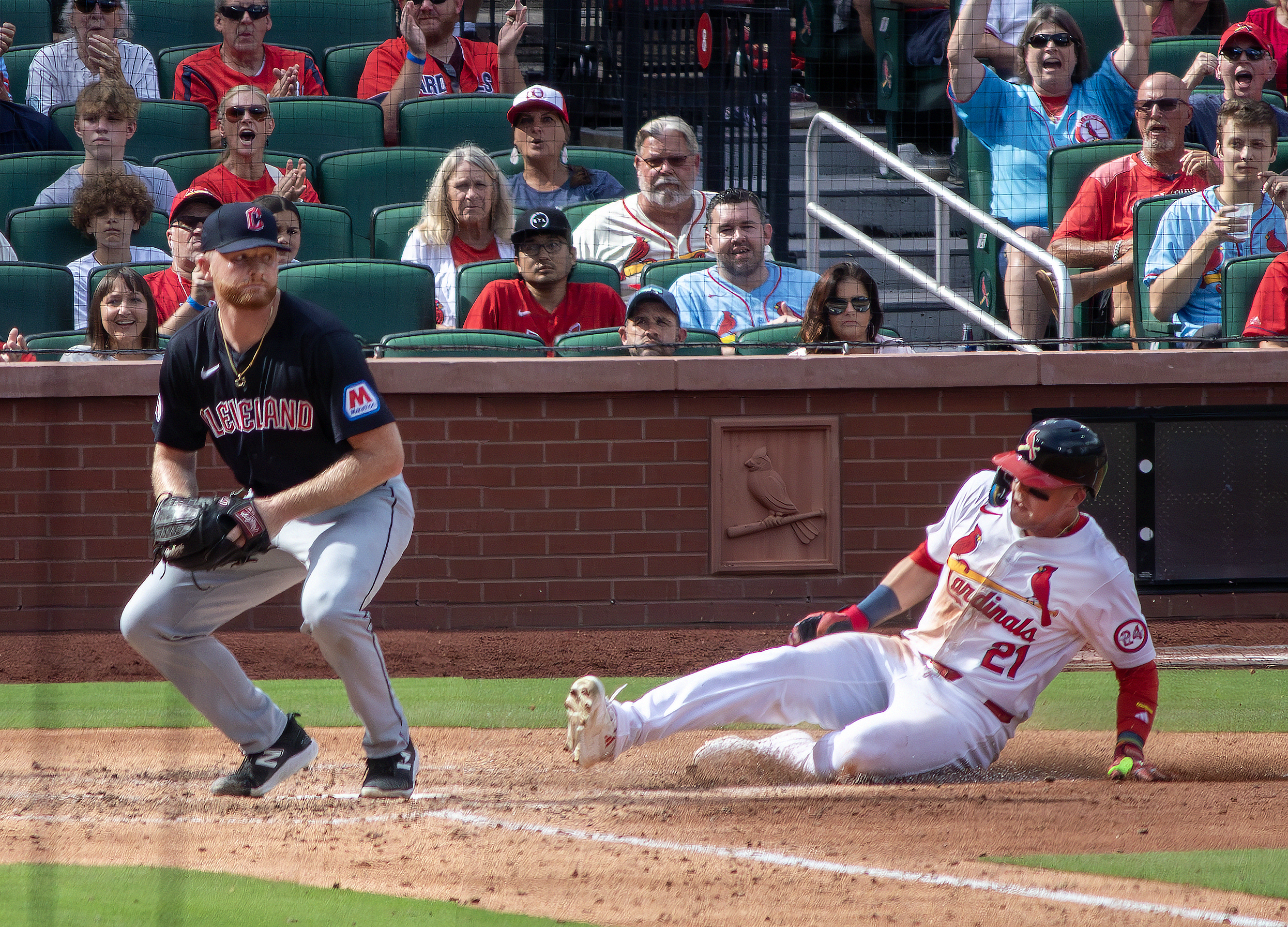
Andrew Walters cover home as Lars Nootbaar slides, 2024.

Walters was selected by the Cleveland Guardians in the second round, with the 62nd overall pick in the 2023 Major League Baseball draft. On July 22, 2023, Walters signed with Cleveland for a below slot deal worth $955,275. He made his professional debut in 2024 with the Double–A Akron RubberDucks. In 50 appearances split between Akron and the Triple–A Columbus Clippers, Walters compiled a 4–0 record and 2.32 ERA with 79 strikeouts and 8 saves over 50 1/3 innings pitched.

On September 12, 2024, Walters was selected to the 40-man roster and promoted to the major leagues for the first time. He made 9 scoreless appearances for Cleveland during his rookie campaign, striking out 6 in 8 2/3 innings pitched.

Walters was optioned to Triple-A Columbus to begin the 2025 season. He was recalled to the majors on May 28, 2025, left his second appearance on May 30 with an injury, and was transferred to the 60-day injured list on June 6. Walters underwent season-ending surgery to repair his right latissimus dorsi muscle on June 9.

Walters returned to action in 2026 with Triple–A Columbus, but struggled to a 7.30 ERA with 23 strikeouts over 14 games. On September 10, 2026, it was announced that Walters had undergone an internal brace procedure to repair the UCL in his right elbow.

== Personal life ==
Walters' parents were college athletes at Florida Tech with his father playing basketball and his mother playing softball. His uncle, Matt Walters, played college football at Miami and was a starting defensive tackle on the Hurricanes' 2001 National Championship team before playing in the NFL for the New York Jets.
