= Daniel Schneemann =

American baseball player (born 1997)

- Schneemann with the Cleveland Guardians in 2026

Cleveland Guardians – No. 10
- Utility player
- Born: January 23, 1997 (age 29); San Diego, California, U.S.
- Bats: Left Throws: Right

MLB debut
- June 2, 2024, for the Cleveland Guardians

MLB statistics (through 2026 season)
- Batting average: .210
- Home runs: 24
- Runs batted in: 93
- Stats at Baseball Reference

Teams
- Cleveland Guardians (2024–present)

Daniel Richard Schneemann (born January 23, 1997) is an American professional baseball utility player for the Cleveland Guardians of Major League Baseball (MLB).

== Amateur career ==
Schneemann attended Bonita Vista High School in Chula Vista, California where he played basketball and baseball. He then played college baseball at Brigham Young University (BYU). In 2017, he played collegiate summer baseball with the St. Cloud Rox of the Northwoods League.

== Professional career ==
Schneemann was selected by the Cleveland Indians in the 33rd round, with the 1,003rd overall selection, of the 2018 Major League Baseball draft. He made his professional debut with the rookie-level Arizona League Indians, hitting .206 in 41 games. Schneemann spent the 2019 campaign with the Single–A Lake County Captains, playing in 70 games and hitting .287/.366/.374 with two home runs and 30 RBI.

Schneemann did not play in a game in 2020 due to the cancellation of the minor league season because of the COVID-19 pandemic. He returned to action in 2021 with Lake County and the Double–A Akron RubberDucks. In 51 games for the two affiliates, Schneemann accumulated a .252/.315/.407 batting line with six home runs, 30 RBI, and nine stolen bases.

Schneemann spent the 2022 campaign with Akron, also receiving a late–season cup of coffee with the Triple–A Columbus Clippers. In 112 games for Akron, he batted .205/.286/.292 with six home runs, 38 RBI, and 20 stolen bases. Schneemann spent the entirety of the 2023 campaign with Columbus, playing in 114 games and slashing .267/.360/.437 with career–highs in home runs (16) and RBI (60) paired with 17 stolen bases.

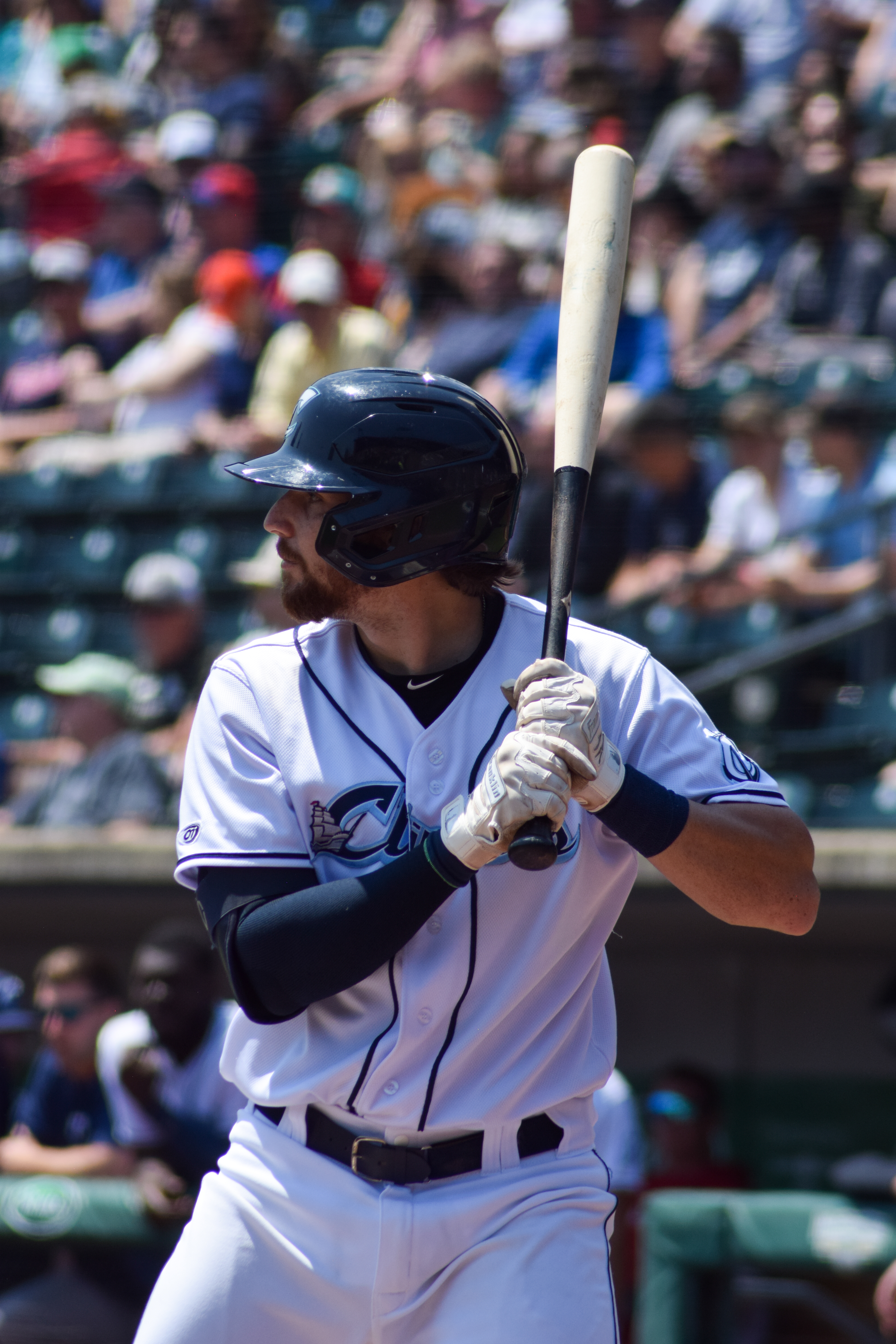
Schneemann at bat for the Columbus Clippers during a game at Huntington Park in Columbus, Ohio on May 17, 2024

Schneemann began the 2024 season with Triple–A Columbus, hitting .294/.428/.556 with 10 home runs and 39 RBI across 53 games. On June 2, 2024, Schneemann was selected to the 40-man roster and promoted to the major leagues for the first time. In his debut, he hit a two–RBI double on the first pitch in his first major league at-bat against Washington Nationals pitcher Jake Irvin.

After the 2025 season, Schneemann was selected as a Gold Glove finalist at the utility position, ultimately losing the award to Mauricio Dubón.

On April 17, 2026, Schneemann hit a grand slam off of Anthony Nunez during a 6–4 loss to the Baltimore Orioles. On June 17, during a 9–4 loss to the Milwaukee Brewers, Schneemann hit another grand slam off of Brandon Sproat. On August 4, Schneemann, David Fry, and Kyle Manzardo were optioned to triple-A, Columbus Clippers, when the Guardians acquired Jo Adell from the Los Angeles Angels, Foster Griffin from the Washington Nationals, and Nathaniel Lowe from the Cincinnati Reds.

== Personal life ==
Schneemann is married to Allie Hancock-Schneemann, an assistant softball coach at BYU.. Schneemann is a member of the Church of Jesus Christ of Latter-day Saints.
