= David Fry (baseball) =

American baseball player (born 1995)

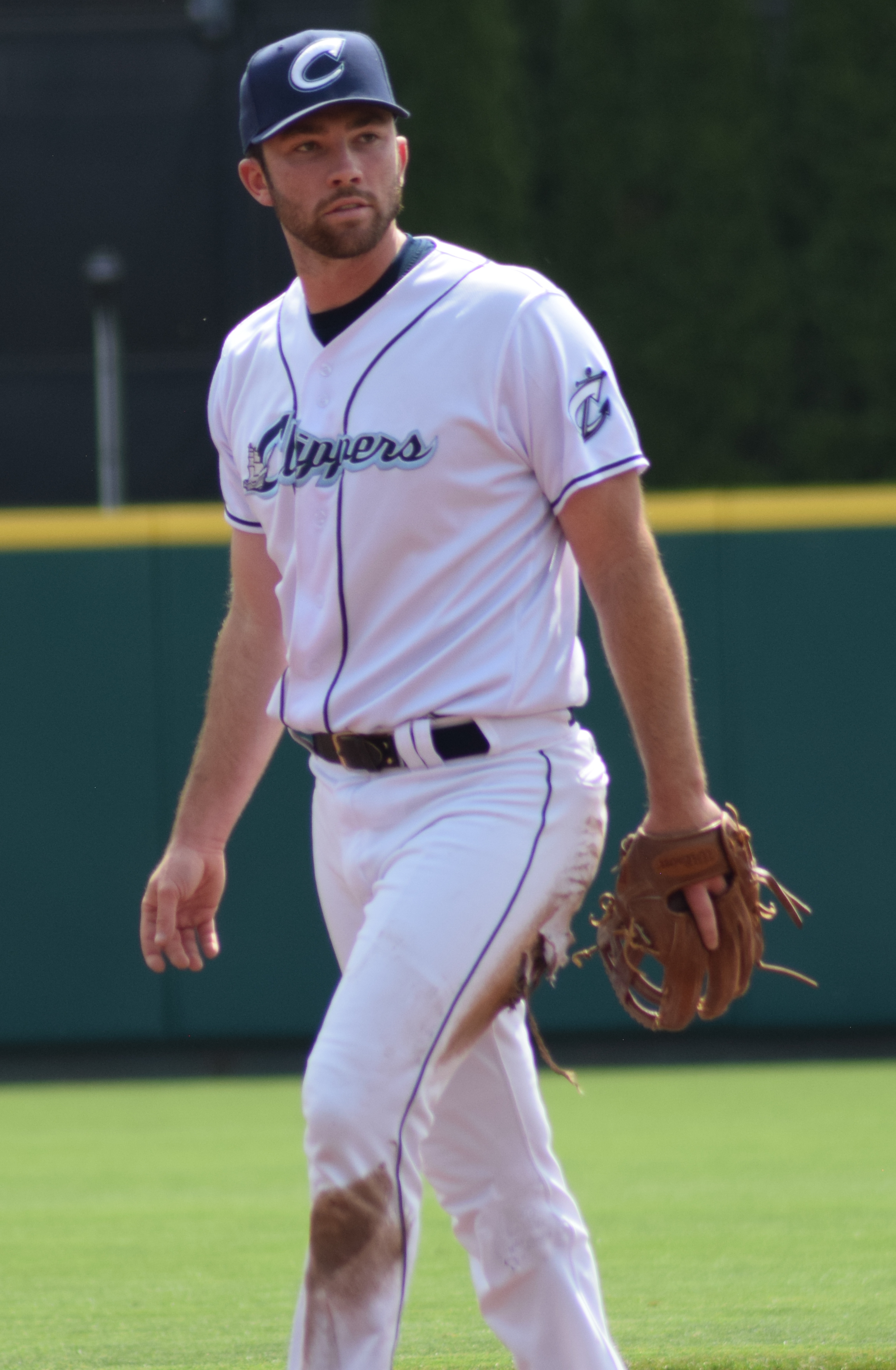
- Fry with the Columbus Clippers in 2023

Free agent
- Catcher / First baseman / Outfielder
- Born: November 20, 1995 (age 31); Irving, Texas, U.S.
- Bats: Right Throws: Right

MLB debut
- May 1, 2023, for the Cleveland Guardians

MLB statistics (through 2026 season)
- Batting average: .227
- Home runs: 34
- Runs batted in: 109
- Stats at Baseball Reference

Teams
- Cleveland Guardians (2023–2026)

Career highlights and awards
- All-Star (2024)

David James Fry (born November 20, 1995) is an American professional baseball catcher, first baseman, and outfielder who is a free agent. He has previously played in Major League Baseball (MLB) for the Cleveland Guardians. He made his MLB debut in 2023 and was named an All-Star in 2024.

== Amateur career ==
Fry attended Grapevine High School in Grapevine, Texas. He enrolled at Northwestern State University and played college baseball for the Northwestern State Demons.

== Professional career ==
=== Milwaukee Brewers ===
The Milwaukee Brewers selected Fry in the seventh round, with the 215th overall selection, of the 2018 Major League Baseball draft. He split his first professional season between the rookie-level Helena Brewers and the Single-A Wisconsin Timber Rattlers, playing in 63 games and slashing .312/.400/.550 with 12 home runs and 57 RBI.

Fry spent the 2019 back with Single-A Wisconsin, playing in 134 games and hitting .258/.329/.444 with 17 home runs, 70 RBI, and 7 stolen bases. He did not play in a game in 2020 due to the cancellation of the minor league season because of the COVID-19 pandemic. Returning to action in 2021, Fry spent time with the Double-A Biloxi Shuckers and the Triple-A Nashville Sounds. In 94 total games, he batted a cumulative .255/.348/.449 with 12 home runs and 46 RBI.

=== Cleveland Guardians ===
On March 13, 2022, Fry was traded to the Cleveland Guardians as the player to be named later in the trade that sent J. C. Mejía to Milwaukee. He spent the year with the Triple-A Columbus Clippers, playing in 119 games and hitting .256/.329/.450 with 17 home runs and 74 RBI. He began the 2023 season with Columbus, hitting .289/.381/.478 with 2 home runs in 25 games.

On May 1, 2023, Fry was selected to the 40-man roster and promoted to the major leagues for the first time. He made his major league debut that same day as a pinch runner for Josh Bell against the New York Yankees. He gave up three homers, 10 hits and seven runs while pitching the last four innings in relief in a 20–6 loss to the Minnesota Twins on September 4. His 64 pitches was the second-most by a non-pitcher, surpassed only by the 65 thrown on May 14, 1988, by José Oquendo who was the previous position player who had a four-inning relief outing.

Fry made the 2024 MLB All-Star Game. In 122 games for Cleveland, he batted .263/.356/.448 with 14 home runs and 51 RBI. In Game 4 of the 2024 ALDS, Fry hit a key home run in the 7th inning and a RBI bunt in the 9th inning to extend the series and help the Guardians advance to the ALCS. In Game 3 of the ALCS, Fry hit a two-run walk-off home run off Clay Holmes to left center field in the bottom of the 10th to give the Guardians a 7–5 victory.

Fry missed the beginning of the 2025 season as a result of elbow surgery. The surgery was a hybrid/internal brace and tendon reconstruction surgery to address a flexor strain and "chronically insufficient" ulnar collateral ligament. On May 31, 2025, Fry was activated off of the injured list. In 66 appearances for Cleveland, he batted .171/.229/.363 with eight home runs, 23 RBI, and one stolen base. On September 23, Fry was hit in the face by a 99-mile-per-hour (159 km/h) fastball thrown by Tarik Skubal of the Detroit Tigers, that was narrowly deflected off his bat during a bunt attempt (resulting in a foul ball, not a hit-by-pitch). Fry was able to board the on-field ambulance under his own power, and was taken to a hospital for observation. The next day, Fry was ruled out for 6-to-8 weeks after he was diagnosed with multiple facial fractures. On October 7, it was announced that Fry would require surgery to repair a deviated septum and fractured nose.

On August 4, 2026, Fry, Kyle Manzardo, and Daniel Schneemann were optioned to triple-A, Columbus Clippers, when the Guardians acquired Jo Adell from the Los Angeles Angels, Foster Griffin from the Washington Nationals, and Nathaniel Lowe from the Cincinnati Reds. This marked Fry's first stint on optioned assignment since making his MLB debut three years prior. He played in 91 games for the Guardians and batted .201 with eight home runs and 20 RBIs. On November 20, 2026, Fry was non-tendered by the Guardians and became a free agent.
