= Hunter Gaddis =

American baseball player (born 1998)

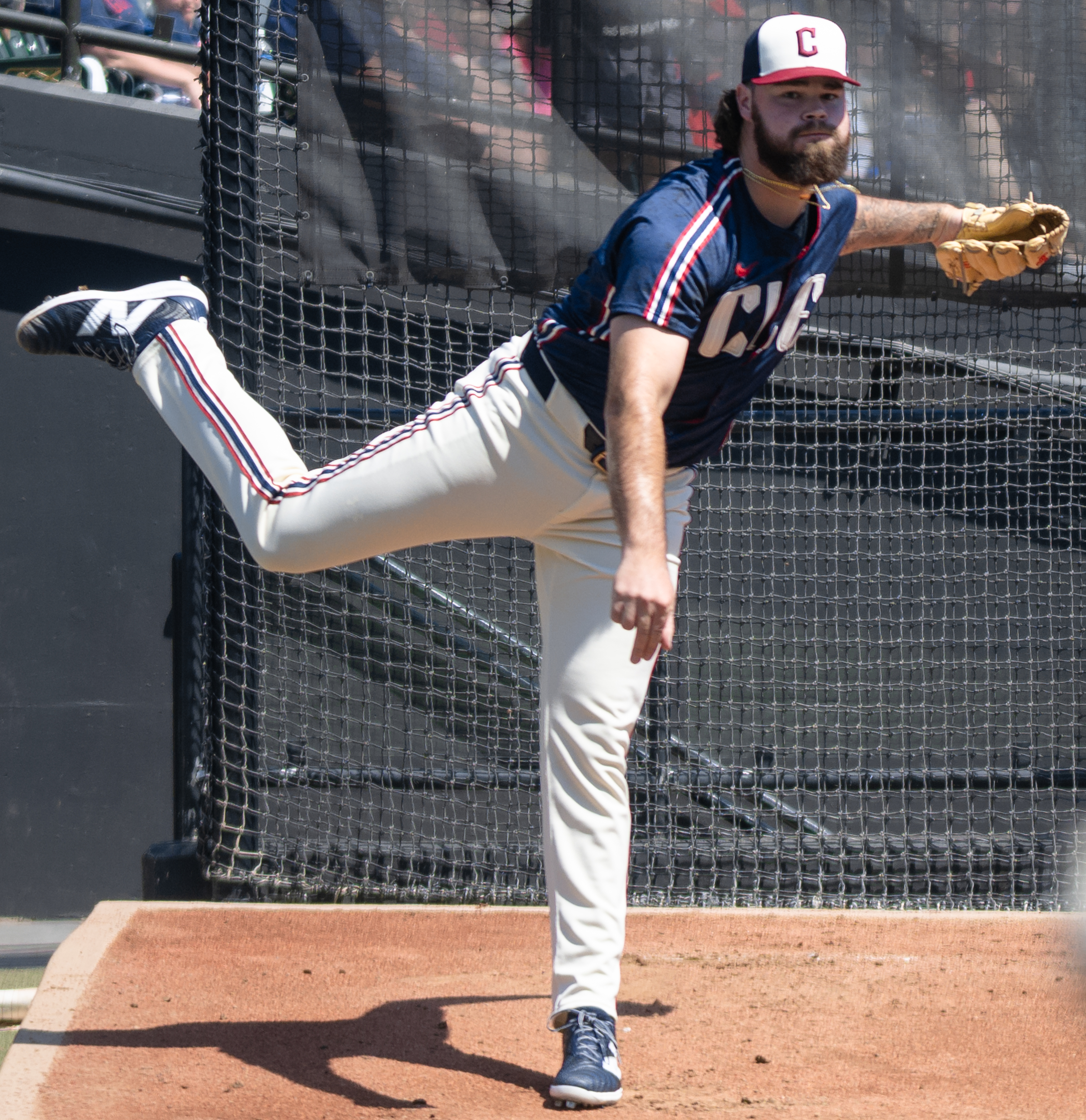
- Gaddis with the Cleveland Guardians in 2024

Cleveland Guardians – No. 33
- Pitcher
- Born: April 9, 1998 (age 28); Canton, Georgia, U.S.
- Bats: Right Throws: Right

MLB debut
- August 5, 2022, for the Cleveland Guardians

MLB statistics (through 2026 season)
- Win–loss record: 16–11
- Earned run average: 3.30
- Strikeouts: 225
- Stats at Baseball Reference

Teams
- Cleveland Guardians (2022–present)

Hunter Reid Gaddis (born April 9, 1998) is an American professional baseball pitcher for the Cleveland Guardians of Major League Baseball (MLB). He made his MLB debut in 2022.

== Amateur career ==
Gaddis attended Sequoyah High School in Canton, Georgia, and enrolled at Georgia State University to play college baseball for the Georgia State Panthers. As a sophomore, he was named second team All-Sun Belt Conference after he went 9–4 with a 2.95 earned run average (ERA) with 98 strikeouts. In 2018, he played collegiate summer baseball with the Chatham Anglers of the Cape Cod Baseball League. Gaddis repeated as a second team All-Sun Belt selection as a junior despite a 1–7 record and led the conference with 112 strikeouts.

== Professional career ==
The Cleveland Indians selected Gaddis in the fifth round of the 2019 Major League Baseball draft. After signing with the team he was initially assigned to the Arizona League Indians before being promoted to the Class A Short-Season Mahoning Valley Scrappers. Gaddis did not play a minor league game in 2020 due to the cancellation of the minor league season caused by the COVID-19 pandemic. He spent the 2021 season with the High-A Lake County Captains and went 4–11 with a 4.16 ERA and 127 strikeouts in 97 1/3 innings pitched. Gaddis was assigned to the Double-A Akron RubberDucks at the start of the 2022 season.

On August 5, 2022, the Cleveland Guardians selected Gaddis' contract from the Triple-A Columbus Clippers. His first season in the majors was forgettable, as he recorded an 18.41 ERA over two relief appearances, earning the loss in both. Gaddis struggled as a starting pitcher in his 2023 rookie season, recording a 5.17 ERA over seven starts. However, he had a breakout 2024 campaign as a full-time relief pitcher, recording a 1.57 ERA, a 0.76 WHIP, and a .166 batting average against. He finished the season with 66 strikeouts in 74 2/3 innings.

In 2025, Gaddis recorded a 3.11 ERA with 73 strikeouts in 66 2/3 innings.

In 2026, Gaddis recorded a 2.98 ERA with 57 strikeouts in 60 1/3 innings.
