= Emmanuel Clase =

Dominican baseball player (born 1998)

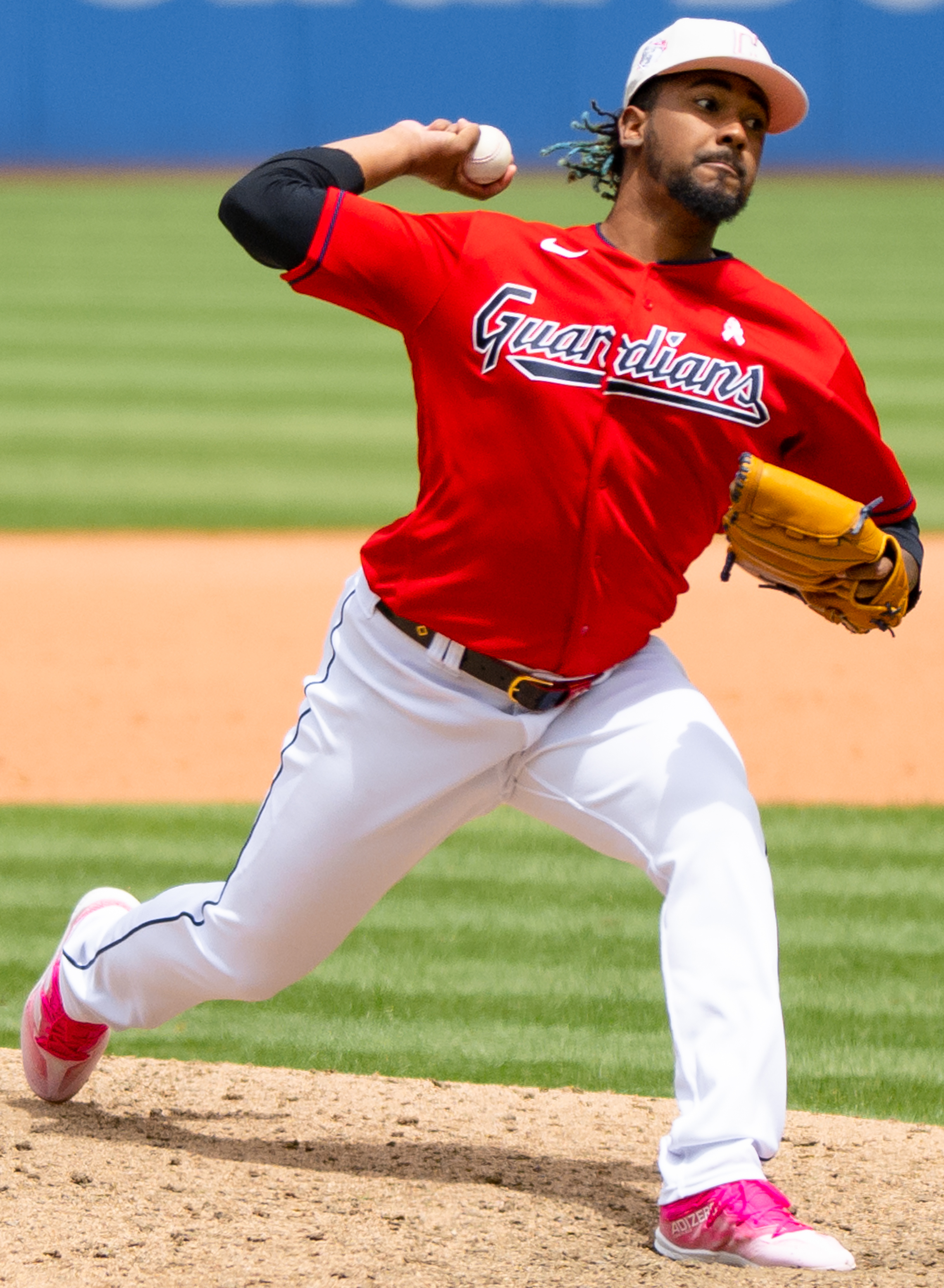
- Clase with the Cleveland Guardians in 2023

Cleveland Guardians – No. 48
- Pitcher
- Born: March 18, 1998 (age 28); Río San Juan, Dominican Republic
- Bats: Right Throws: Right

MLB debut
- August 4, 2019, for the Texas Rangers

MLB statistics (through 2025 season)
- Win–loss record: 21–26
- Earned run average: 1.88
- Strikeouts: 349
- Saves: 182
- Stats at Baseball Reference

Teams
- Texas Rangers (2019); Cleveland Indians / Guardians (2021–2025)

Career highlights and awards
- 3× All-Star (2022–2024); 2× All-MLB First Team (2022, 2024); 2× AL Reliever of the Year (2022, 2024); 3× AL saves leader (2022–2024)

Emmanuel Clase (Spanish pronunciation: [’klase] clahs-AY; born March 18, 1998) is a Dominican former professional baseball pitcher who previously played for the Cleveland Guardians of Major League Baseball (MLB). He made his MLB for the Texas Rangers in 2019.

Clase was traded to Cleveland following the 2019 season and became their main closer in 2021. With Cleveland, he was named an All-Star and led the American League in saves three times, was named AL Reliever of the Year in 2022 and 2024, and is the franchise's all-time save leader.

Since July 2025, Clase has been on non-disciplinary paid leave as part of a league investigation into sports betting. In November 2025, he was federally indicted and arrested in relation to the investigation.

== Career ==
=== San Diego Padres ===
Clase signed with the San Diego Padres as an international free agent on February 11, 2015, for a $125,000 signing bonus. He played for the DSL Padres in 2015, going 2–1 with a 1.99 ERA in 54 innings. In 2016, he played for the AZL Padres, going 2–0 with a 4.01 ERA in 24 2/3 innings. In 2017, he played for the AZL Padres (2), going 2–4 with a 5.30 ERA in 35 2/3 innings, and in one game with the Tri-City Dust Devils of the Class A Short Season Northwest League, allowing 5 runs in 3 1/3 innings.

=== Texas Rangers ===
On May 7, 2018, the Padres traded Clase to the Texas Rangers as the player to be named later in an earlier trade for Brett Nicholas. Clase was assigned to the Spokane Indians of the Northwest League, and finished the 2018 season after going 1–1 with a 0.64 ERA, 27 strikeouts, and 12 saves in 28 1/3 innings. Clase was assigned to the Down East Wood Ducks of the High-A Carolina League to open the 2019 season. He appeared in 6 games for them, going 2–0 with a 0.00 ERA, 1 save, and 11 strikeouts in 7 innings. On April 23, he was promoted to the Frisco RoughRiders of the Double-A Texas League, and went 1–2 with a 3.35 ERA and 39 strikeouts over 37 2/3 innings.

On August 2, 2019, the Rangers selected Clase's contract and promoted him to MLB. He made his MLB debut on August 4, pitching 1 2/3 scoreless innings. Clase had a 2–3 record, 2.31 ERA, and 21 strikeouts over 23 1/3 innings. His cutter was on average the fastest in MLB, at 99.2 miles per hour (159.6 km/h).

=== Cleveland Indians / Guardians ===
On December 15, 2019, the Rangers traded Clase and Delino DeShields Jr. to the Cleveland Indians in exchange for Corey Kluber and cash considerations. Clase was suspended for 80 games on May 1, 2020, after testing positive for Boldenone, a banned performance-enhancing substance. Due to the COVID-19 pandemic and the shortening of the 2020 Major League Baseball season to 60 games, Clase's suspension was lifted at the conclusion of the 2020 season.

Clase joined Cleveland's bullpen for the 2021 season. After converting all six save opportunities in August and holding opposing batters to a .095 batting average, he was named American League (AL) Reliever of the Month. In 2021, he was 4–5 with a 1.29 ERA in 69 2/3 innings. He earned 24 saves in 29 opportunities, a franchise rookie record. He finished fifth in AL Rookie of the Year voting.

On April 2, 2022, Clase agreed to a five-year $20 million extension with Cleveland. In July, he was named to his first career All-Star team. He pitched the ninth inning for the AL at Dodger Stadium and struck out the side to get the save and secure a 3–2 victory. In 2022, he was 3–4 with a 1.36 ERA in 72 2/3 innings and led MLB in saves. He earned 42 saves in 46 opportunities.

In 2023, Clase was named to his second consecutive All-Star team. He was 3–9 with a 3.22 ERA in 72 2/3 innings and led MLB in saves for the second year in a row. He had 44 saves in 56 opportunities.

In July 2024, Clase was named to his third career All-Star team. He threw a scoreless ninth inning for the AL to get the save and secure a 5–3 victory. On August 30, Clase recorded his 150th save for Cleveland, passing Cody Allen to become the franchise's all-time save leader. He finished the regular season with an AL-leading 47 saves, also a career high, and a 0.61 ERA, the second-lowest ever for a pitcher with at least 70 innings in a season. He won his second AL Reliever of the Year Award and finished third in AL Cy Young Award and 11th in AL Most Valuable Player Award voting.

Clase allowed more earned runs in the 2024 postseason than he did in the regular season. In Game 2 of the AL Division Series, he gave up a game-winning three-run home run in the ninth inning to Kerry Carpenter of the Detroit Tigers, the first runs Clase allowed since August 30 and just his third home run allowed in the season. Clase recorded saves in games 4 and 5 that won the series, with the latter being the first six-out save of his major league career. In Game 3 of the AL Championship Series, Clase gave up back-to-back home runs in the top of the 8th inning to New York Yankees sluggers Aaron Judge and Giancarlo Stanton. In Game 4, with the game tied in the 9th inning, Clase gave up two more runs as his postseason ERA ballooned to 10.29, compared to his 0.61 ERA in 74 games during the regular season.

In 2025, he was 5–3 with a 3.23 ERA in 47 1/3 innings. He also compiled 24 saves in 29 opportunities before he was placed on paid leave in July.

== Gambling allegations, indictment and arrest ==
On July 28, 2025, Clase was placed on non-disciplinary paid leave as part of an investigation by MLB into sports betting. Clase did not pitch again that season. Following the end of the season, he attempted to join the Estrellas Orientales of the Dominican Professional Baseball League (LIDOM). However, because the gambling investigation was active, LIDOM did not allow him to play.

On November 9, 2025, federal prosecutors from the United States District Court for the Eastern District of New York indicted Clase and teammate Luis Ortiz on charges including wire fraud conspiracy, conspiracy to influence sporting contests by bribery, and money laundering conspiracy. The indictment allege that Clase and Ortiz "agreed in advance with their co-conspirators to throw specific types of pitches and speeds of pitches", and the co-conspirators then used the information to place bets. The indictment alleged that the two pitchers purposefully threw balls and slower pitches, conspiring with bettors, who made at least $450,000 by placing prop bets on specific pitches. On November 13, Clase was arrested at JFK Airport in New York City by Federal Bureau of Investigation agents. Hours later, he was arraigned in a Brooklyn federal court, entering a plea of not guilty.

Clause's federal trial began in November 2026.

== Player profile ==
Clase throws an upper 90s/low 100s mph cut fastball and a low 90s slider. He has demonstrated an exceptional ability to control his pitches despite throwing at such a high velocity, averaging just 1.8 walks per 9 innings as of the end of the 2025 season.

== Personal life ==
Clase has a child.
