= Jhonkensy Noel =

Dominican baseball player (born 2001)

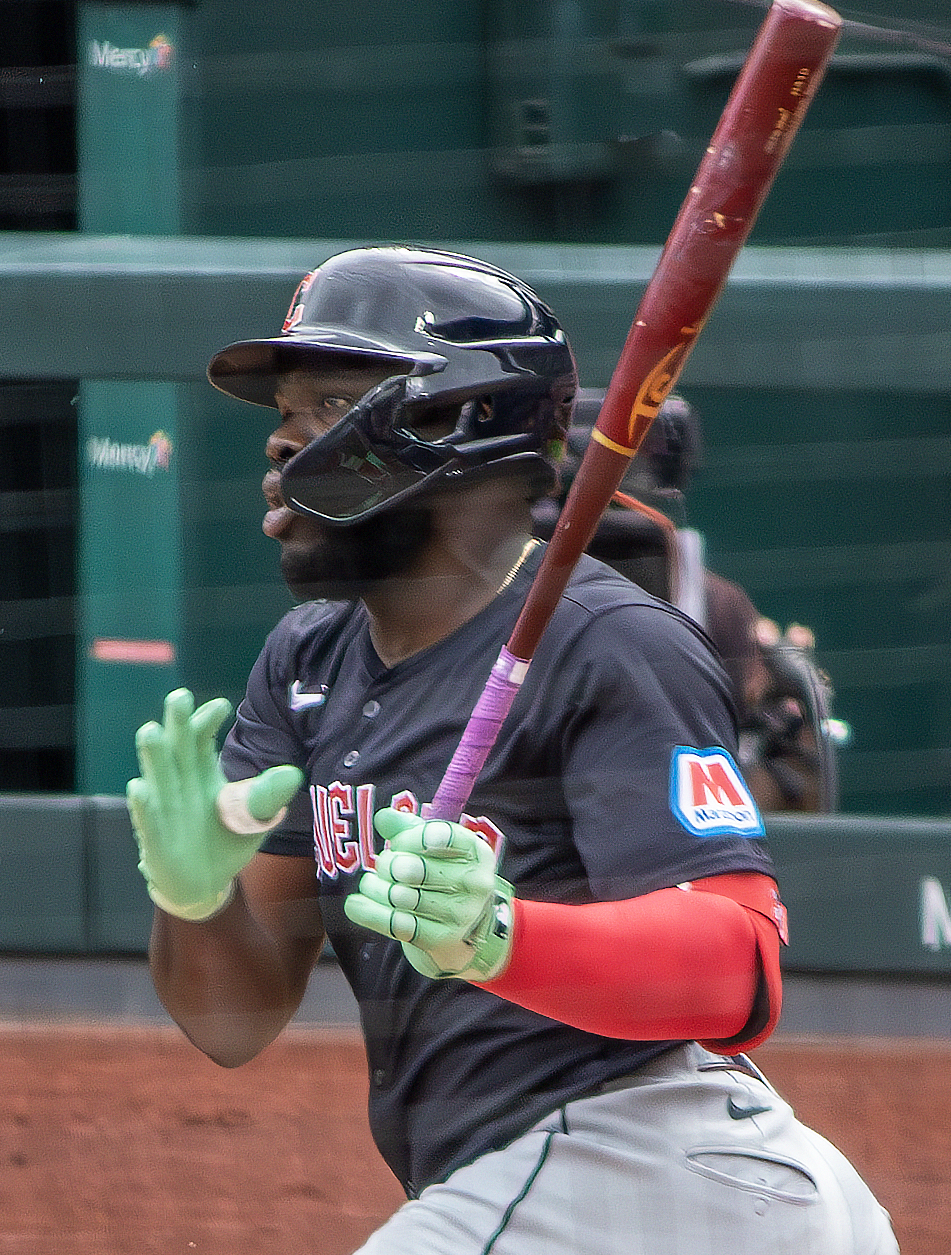
- Noel with the Cleveland Guardians in 2024

Free agent
- First baseman / Outfielder
- Born: July 15, 2001 (age 25); San Pedro de Macorís, Dominican Republic
- Bats: Right Throws: Right

MLB debut
- June 26, 2024, for the Cleveland Guardians

MLB statistics (through 2025 season)
- Batting average: .193
- Home runs: 19
- Runs batted in: 41
- Stats at Baseball Reference

Teams
- Cleveland Guardians (2024–2025)

Jhonkensy Albert Noel (born July 15, 2001), nicknamed "Big Christmas", is a Dominican professional baseball first baseman and outfielder who is a free agent. He has previously played in Major League Baseball (MLB) for the Cleveland Guardians.

== Career ==
=== Cleveland Guardians ===
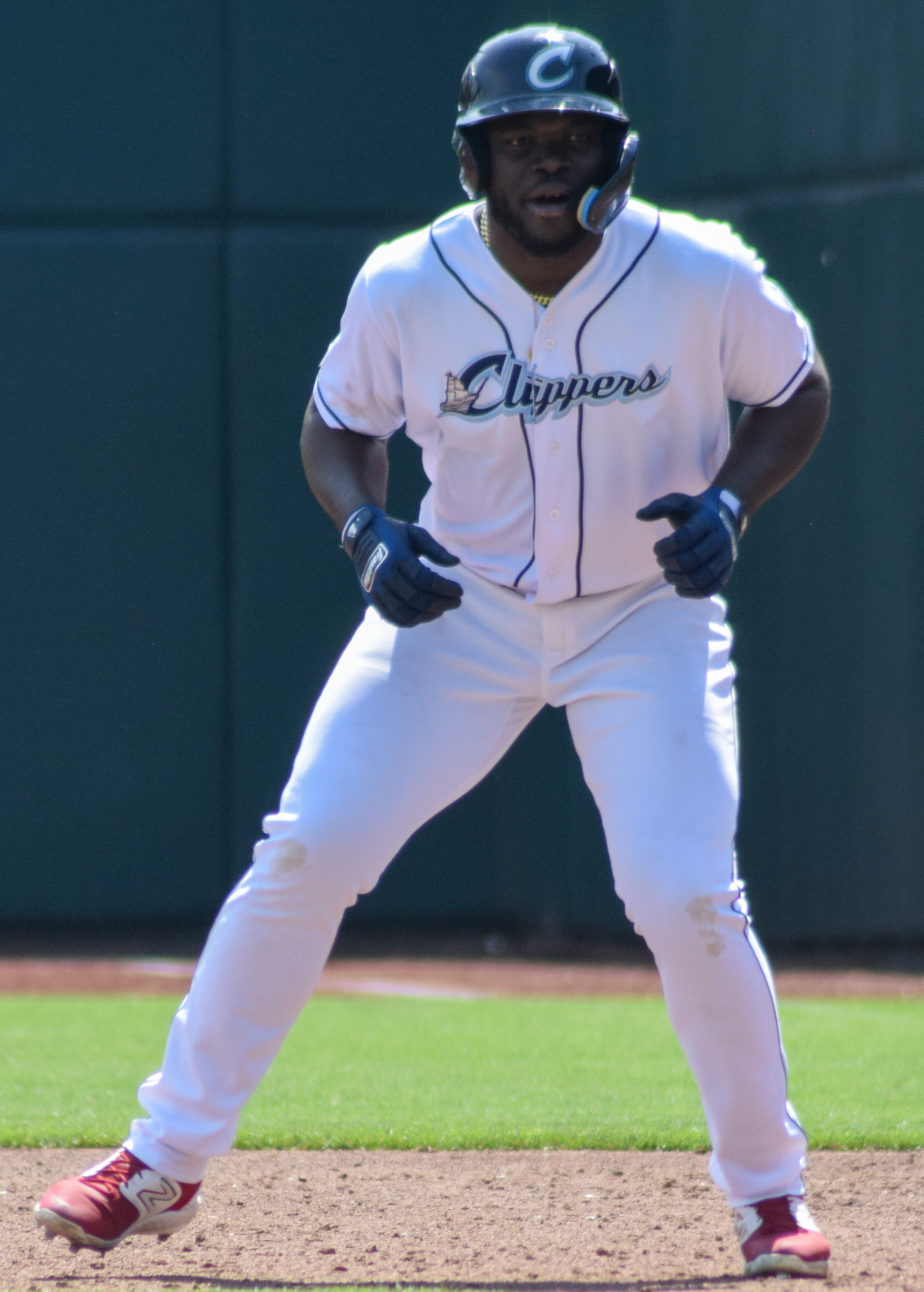
Noel with the Columbus Clippers

Noel signed with the Cleveland Indians organization as an international free agent on July 15, 2017. He made his professional debut in 2018 with the Dominican Summer League Indians, batting .243 with ten home runs and 34 runs batted in (RBIs) over 64 games. In 2019, he played for the Arizona League Indians where he hit .287 with six home runs and 42 RBIs over 47 games. He did not play a game in 2020 due to the cancellation of the minor league season because of the COVID-19 pandemic. Noel split the 2021 season between the Arizona League, the Lynchburg Hillcats, and the Lake County Captains, slashing .340/.390/.615 with 19 home runs and 66 RBIs over 70 games.

The newly named Cleveland Guardians added Noel to their 40-man roster on November 19, 2021, protecting him from the Rule 5 draft. He split the 2022 campaign between Lake County, the Double-A Akron RubberDucks, and the Triple-A Columbus Clippers, hitting a combined .229/.310/.489 with 32 home runs and 84 RBIs. Noel was optioned to Triple-A Columbus to begin the 2023 season. He spent the entirety of the season with the Clippers, batting .220/.303/.420 with 27 home runs and 85 RBIs.

On March 12, 2024, Noel was cut from major league spring training camp and optioned to Triple–A Columbus to start the year. On June 26, Noel was promoted to the major leagues for the first time. He made his major league debut that day against the Baltimore Orioles, recording a home run in his first major league at-bat. Pinch-hitting in the ninth inning with two outs in Game 3 of the ALCS, Noel hit a game-tying two-run home run; the Guardians won over the Yankees in 10 innings.

Noel made 69 appearances for Cleveland during the 2025 season, batting .162/.183/.297 with six home runs and 13 RBIs. On December 17, 2025, Noel was designated for assignment by the Guardians following the acquisition of Justin Bruihl.

=== Baltimore Orioles ===
On January 5, 2026, the Baltimore Orioles claimed Noel off waivers. Two days later, he was designated for assignment following the acquisition of Marco Luciano. On January 14, Noel cleared waivers and was sent outright to the Triple-A Norfolk Tides. In 31 appearances split between the rookie–level Florida Complex League Orioles and Triple-A Norfolk, he batted .135/.226/.252 with three home runs and 14 RBI. Noel was released by the Orioles on July 22.

== See also ==
- List of Major League Baseball players with a home run in their first major league at bat
