= Tanner Bibee =

American baseball player (born 1999)

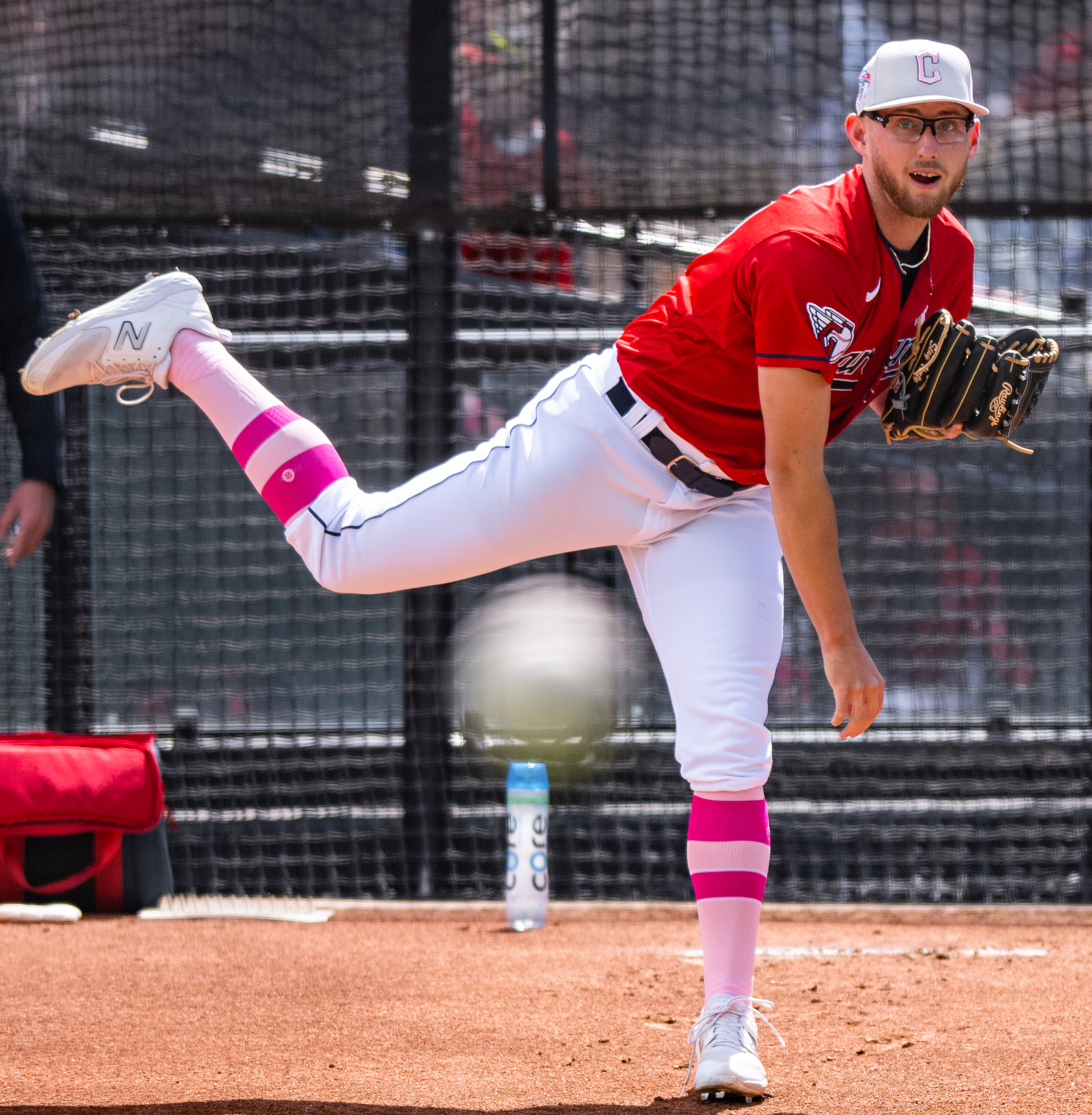
- Bibee with the Cleveland Guardians in 2023

Cleveland Guardians – No. 28
- Pitcher
- Born: March 5, 1999 (age 27); Mission Viejo, California, U.S.
- Bats: Right Throws: Right

MLB debut
- April 26, 2023, for the Cleveland Guardians

MLB statistics (through 2026 season)
- Win–loss record: 41–38
- Earned run average: 3.82
- Strikeouts: 638
- Stats at Baseball Reference

Teams
- Cleveland Guardians (2023–present)

Career highlights and awards
- Gold Glove Award (2026)

Tanner Hayes Bibee (/ˈbaɪbiː/ BY-bee; born March 5, 1999) is an American professional baseball pitcher for the Cleveland Guardians of Major League Baseball (MLB). He made his MLB debut in 2023.

== Amateur career ==
Bibee attended Mission Viejo High School in Mission Viejo, California and California State University, Fullerton, where he played college baseball for the Cal State Fullerton Titans. In 2019, he played collegiate summer baseball with the Wareham Gatemen of the Cape Cod Baseball League. He was eligible for the 2020 Major League Baseball draft but went undrafted and returned to Fullerton for his senior year.

== Professional career ==
The Cleveland Guardians selected Bibee in the fifth round with the 156th overall selection of the 2021 Major League Baseball draft. He made his professional debut in 2022 with the High-A Lake County Captains. Splitting the year between Lake County and the Double-A Akron RubberDucks, Bibee worked to a combined 8–2 record and 2.17 ERA with 167 strikeouts in 132 2/3 innings pitched across 25 starts. He began the 2023 season with the Triple-A Columbus Clippers, posting a 2–0 record and 1.76 ERA with 19 strikeouts in 3 starts.

On April 26, 2023, Bibee was promoted to the major leagues for the first time. He made his major league debut that day, starting against the Colorado Rockies. In his debut, Bibee became the first Cleveland pitcher since at least 1920 to record at least five consecutive strikeouts in a major league debut. He ended the game with a final line of 5 2/3 innings pitched with 8 strikeouts and 1 earned run while recording his first career win. In 25 starts for Cleveland, Bibee posted a 10–4 record and 2.98 ERA with 141 strikeouts in 142 innings of work. On September 24, it was announced that Bibee would miss the remainder of the year with right hip inflammation. Cleveland subsequently placed him on the 60-day injured list.

Bibee made 31 starts during the 2024 season, registering a 12–8 record and 3.47 ERA with 187 strikeouts across 173 2/3 innings pitched. Bibee won a Fielding Bible Award, given to the best fielding pitcher.

On March 22, 2025, Bibee and the Guardians agreed to a five-year, $48 million contract extension. He was named Cleveland's Opening Day starter but was later scratched due to acute gastroenteritis. Bibee made his first 2025 start on March 30 against the Kansas City Royals, where he pitched 5 2/3 innings, allowing two runs, two walks, and getting two strikeouts as he earned his first win of the season in a 6–2 victory. On September 12, Bibee pitched a complete-game shutout with 10 strikeouts against the Chicago White Sox; it was the first complete game shutout for Cleveland since Zach Plesac achieved the feat in 2019.
