= Pedro Ávila =

Venezuelan baseball player (born 1997)

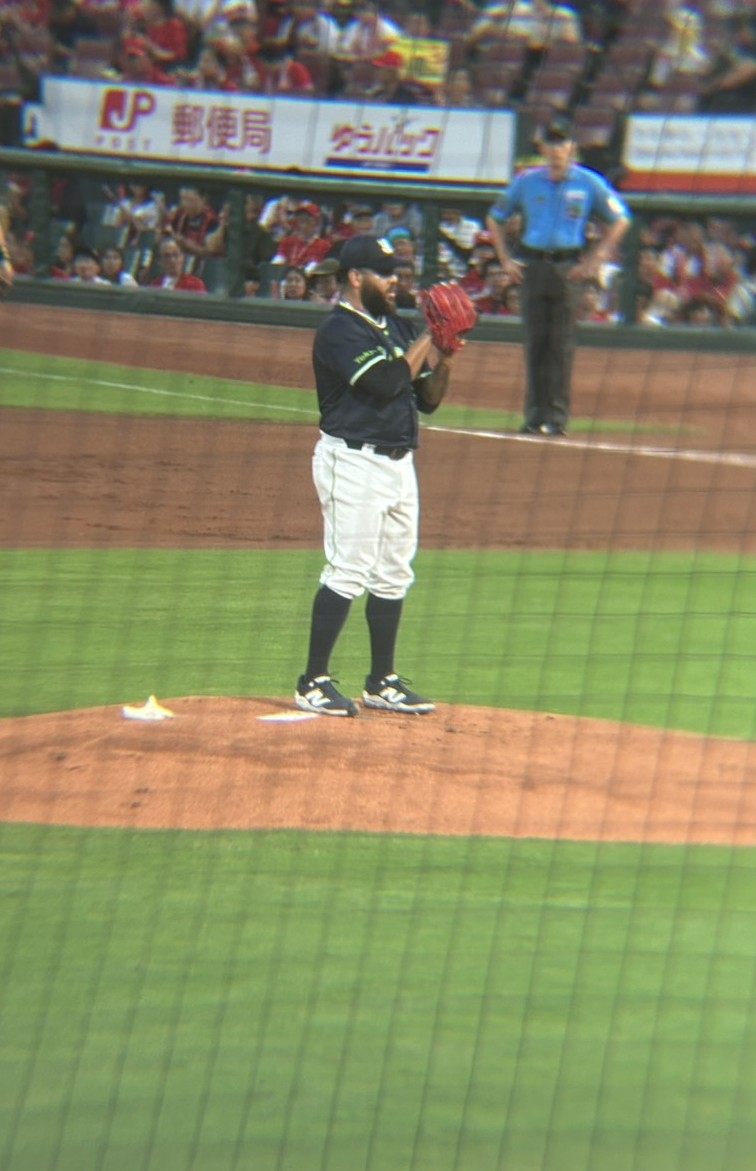
- Avila with the Tokyo Yakult Swallows

SSG Landers – No. 33
- Pitcher
- Born: January 14, 1997 (age 29); Caracas, Venezuela
- Bats: Right Throws: Right

Professional debut
- MLB: April 11, 2019, for the San Diego Padres
- NPB: May 14, 2025, for the Tokyo Yakult Swallows
- KBO: July 16, 2026, for the SSG Landers

MLB statistics (through 2024 season)
- Win–loss record: 8–4
- Earned run average: 3.51
- Strikeouts: 151

NPB statistics (through 2025 season)
- Win–loss record: 7–8
- Earned run average: 4.04
- Strikeouts: 61

KBO statistics (through August 16, 2026)
- Win–loss record: 4–0
- Earned run average: 1.54
- Strikeouts: 40
- Stats at Baseball Reference

Teams
- San Diego Padres (2019, 2021–2024); Cleveland Guardians (2024); Tokyo Yakult Swallows (2025); SSG Landers (2026–present)

Pedro Manuel Ávila (born January 14, 1997) is a Venezuelan professional baseball pitcher for the SSG Landers of the KBO League. He has previously played in Major League Baseball (MLB) for the San Diego Padres and Cleveland Guardians, and in Nippon Professional Baseball (NPB) for the Tokyo Yakult Swallows (NPB). He made his MLB debut in 2019.

== Career ==
=== Washington Nationals ===
Ávila was signed as an international free agent by the Washington Nationals on July 5, 2014. He made his professional debut in 2015, and played for the Rookie-level Dominican Summer League Nationals and the Rookie-level Gulf Coast League Nationals, going 7–3 with a 2.12 ERA in 63 2/3 innings. He played for the Single–A Hagerstown Suns in 2016, going 7–7 with a 3.48 ERA in 93 innings.

=== San Diego Padres ===
On December 2, 2016, the Nationals traded Ávila to the San Diego Padres in exchange for Derek Norris. Ávila split the 2017 season between the Single-A Fort Wayne TinCaps and the High-A Lake Elsinore Storm. He accumulated an 8–5 record with a 3.70 ERA in 128 1/3 innings, and finished the season with 170 strikeouts, the most by a Padres minor leaguer that season. In 2018, he pitched the full season in Lake Elsinore, making 20 starts with a 4.27 ERA and striking out 142 batters in 130 2/3 innings.

The Padres added Ávila to their 40-man roster after the 2018 season, in order to protect him from the Rule 5 draft. He opened the 2019 season with the Amarillo Sod Poodles of the Double-A Texas League. On April 11, 2019, he was promoted to the major leagues for the first time. In a start versus the Arizona Diamondbacks, he went 5 1/3 innings and allowed one run while recording five strikeouts in his debut. He became the first player in Sod Poodle history to reach MLB. He was optioned back to Amarillo on April 12. Ávila suffered an elbow injury in August and underwent Tommy John surgery in September 2019.

Ávila was designated for assignment on November 27, 2019. He was non-tendered on December 2 and became a free agent. He re-signed with San Diego the next day on a minor league contract. Ávila did not play in a game in 2020 due to the cancellation of the minor league season because of the COVID-19 pandemic.

San Diego selected his contract to the active roster on October 1, 2021. He made 1 start for San Diego, logging a 2.25 ERA with 5 strikeouts in 4 innings.

Ávila was optioned to the Triple-A El Paso Chihuahuas to begin the 2022 season. He was recalled from the Chihuahuas on April 13 and joined the Padres' active roster. He made 2 appearances with a 4.50 ERA and 5 strikeouts in 4 innings before being optioned to Triple-A El Paso on May 5. On June 6, Ávila was removed from the 40-man roster and sent outright to the Chihuahuas. He made 30 appearances (24 starts) for the affiliate, recording a 7-2 record and 4.58 ERA with 124 strikeouts in 112 innings pitched.

On November 10, 2022, the Padres selected his contract onto the 40-man roster. Ávila was optioned to Triple-A El Paso to begin the 2023 season. He was recalled from El Paso on July 1 and joined the Padres' active roster. He made 1 appearance for the team, then was optioned back to El Paso on July 3. He was recalled to the Padres' active roster again on July 23, where he remained for the rest of the 2023 season. That season, he accumulated a 2-2 record and a 3.22 ERA in 14 appearances and 6 starts for the Padres. He struck out 54 batters in 50 1/3 innings.

In 2024, Ávila made San Diego's Opening Day roster as part of the bullpen. In four appearances, he struggled to a 9.00 ERA with nine strikeouts across eight innings pitched. On April 12, 2024, Ávila was designated for assignment by the Padres.

=== Cleveland Guardians ===
On April 16, 2024, Ávila was traded to the Cleveland Guardians in exchange for cash considerations. In 50 appearances for Cleveland, he compiled a 5-1 record and 3.25 ERA with 73 strikeouts across 74 2/3 innings pitched. Ávila was designated for assignment by the Guardians on January 22, 2025. He cleared waivers on January 29 and was sent outright to the Triple-A Columbus Clippers, but rejected the assignment the following day and elected free agency.

=== Tokyo Yakult Swallows ===
On February 14, 2025, Ávila signed a contract with the Tokyo Yakult Swallows of Nippon Professional Baseball. He made 15 appearances for the Swallows, compiling a 7-8 record and 4.04 ERA with 61 strikeouts across 82 1/3 innings pitched. Ávila became a free agent following the season.

=== Cleveland Guardians (second stint) ===
On December 30, 2025, Ávila signed a minor league contract with the Cleveland Guardians. He was released by the Guardians on March 17, 2026, after he failed to make the team's roster. Ávila re-signed with Cleveland on a new minor league contract on March 22. He made 15 appearances (13 starts) for the Triple-A Columbus Clippers, posting a 3–7 record with a 7.50 ERA, 49 strikeouts, and 32 walks across 60 innings of work. On July 1, Ávila opted out of his contract and was released by the organization.

=== SSG Landers ===
On July 8, 2026, Ávila signed with the SSG Landers of the KBO League. He finished the season with a 1.44 ERA, a record of 9-2 and 93 strikeouts.

On November 13, 2026, Ávila re-signed with the Landers on two-years contract, $3.1 million.

== See also ==
- List of Major League Baseball players from Venezuela
