= Estevan Florial =

Dominican-Haitian baseball player (born 1997)

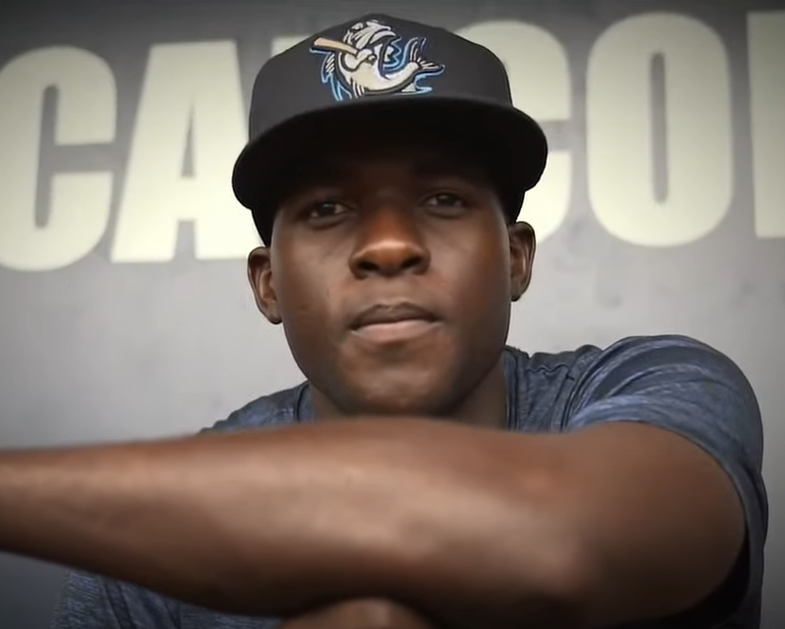

Dorados de Chihuahua
- Outfielder
- Born: November 25, 1997 (age 28); Barahona, Dominican Republic
- Bats: Left Throws: Right

Professional debut
- MLB: August 28, 2020, for the New York Yankees
- KBO: March 22, 2025, for the Hanwha Eagles

MLB statistics (through 2024 season)
- Batting average: .192
- Home runs: 4
- Runs batted in: 22

KBO statistics (through 2025 season)
- Batting average: .271
- Home runs: 8
- Runs batted in: 29
- Stats at Baseball Reference

Teams
- New York Yankees (2020–2023); Cleveland Guardians (2024); Hanwha Eagles (2025)

Estevan Haniel Florial (born November 25, 1997) is a Dominican-Haitian professional baseball outfielder for the Dorados de Chihuahua of the Mexican League. He has previously played in Major League Baseball (MLB) for the New York Yankees and Cleveland Guardians, and in the KBO League for the Hanwha Eagles.

== Background ==
Estevan Florial was born and raised in Santo Domingo, Dominican Republic. He holds dual-citizenship with Haiti due to his mother being born there. In the first couple of years with the Yankees organization, they mistakenly listed him as being born in Port-au-Prince, Haiti, which would have made him a forerunner to become the first Haitian-born Major League player. Florial signed with the New York Yankees under the name Haniel d'Oleo in 2014. However the contract was voided after he was unable to provide a birth certificate and he re-signed with the Yankees under the name Estevan Florial in 2015.

== Career ==
=== New York Yankees ===
==== Minor leagues ====
Florial made his professional debut that season with the Dominican Summer League Yankees 1 where he batted .313 with seven home runs and 53 RBIs in 57 games. He played in 2016 with the Pulaski Yankees, Charleston RiverDogs and Tampa Yankees, batting a combined .227 with eight home runs and thirty RBIs in 67 total games among the three teams.

Florial started the 2017 season with Charleston. He was selected to appear in the All-Star Futures Game in July. After batting .297 with 11 home runs, 43 RBIs and 17 stolen bases for Charleston, he was promoted to Tampa in August, where he finished the season slashing .303/.368/.461 with two home runs and 14 RBIs in 19 games. The Yankees promoted him to the Trenton Thunder for their postseason but did not appear in a game.

Florial entered 2018 as one of the top prospects in the minor leagues. Playing for Tampa, he broke the hamate bone in his right wrist in May and required surgery, costing him three months of the season. In 2019, the Yankees invited Florial to spring training as a non-roster player. He suffered a non-displaced fracture in his right wrist during spring training. He returned to Tampa in June, where he played for the 2019 season.

==== Major leagues ====
Florial was called up to the majors on August 28, 2020. He played in the first game of a doubleheader that same day against the New York Mets, where he got his first MLB hit. At the end of the day he was sent back to the minors.

On July 20, 2021, the Yankees promoted Florial to the major leagues to replace the injured Trey Amburgey. He recorded his first major league RBI on a groundout to first base, and later hit his first major league home run; a solo shot off of pitcher Enyel De Los Santos of the Philadelphia Phillies. In 11 games for the Yankees, Florial went 6–for–20 (.300) with one home run, two RBI, and one stolen base. Florial made 17 appearances for New York in 2022, going 3–for–31 (.097) with one RBI and two stolen bases.

Out of options in 2023, Florial made the Yankees Opening Day roster. He appeared as a pinch runner on Opening Day, but was designated for assignment on April 1. Florial had 63 plate appearances for the Yankees across four seasons, batting .185 with 21 strikeouts. He cleared waivers and was sent outright to the Triple-A Scranton/Wilkes-Barre RailRiders on April 7. In 101 games in Triple–A, he batted .284/.380/.565 with 28 home runs, 79 RBIs, and 25 stolen bases. On September 11, Florial had his contract selected back to the major league roster. In 19 major league games for New York, he hit .230/.324/.312 with no home runs, eight RBIs, and three stolen bases.

=== Cleveland Guardians ===
On December 26, 2023, the Yankees traded Florial to the Cleveland Guardians in exchange for Cody Morris. In 36 games for Cleveland in 2024, he batted .173/.264/.367 with career–highs in home runs (3) and RBI (11). Florial was designated for assignment by the Guardians on May 31, 2024. He cleared waivers and was sent outright to the Triple-A Columbus Clippers on June 7. Florial elected minor league free agency on October 21.

=== Hanwha Eagles ===
On December 10, 2024, Florial signed with the Hanwha Eagles of the KBO League. In 65 appearances for the Eagles, he slashed .271/.333/.450 with eight home runs, 29 RBI, and 13 stolen bases. On June 17, 2025, it was announced that Florial had suffered a broken right pinkie, and would be temporarily replaced by Luis Liberato. On July 26, Florial was released by the Eagles after being medically cleared, who elected to keep Liberato for the remainder of the season.

=== Leones de Yucatán ===
On February 3, 2026, Florial signed with the Leones de Yucatán of the Mexican League. In 27 appearances for Yucatán, he slashed .193/.330/.289 with two home runs and eight RBI.

=== Caliente de Durango ===
On May 23, 2026, Florial was traded to the Caliente de Durango of the Mexican League. In 61 appearances for Durango, he batted .332/.427/.612 with 13 home runs and 39 RBI.

=== Dorados de Chihuahua ===
On September 21, 2026, Florial was traded to the Dorados de Chihuahua of the Mexican League.
