= Kyle Manzardo =

American baseball player (born 2000)

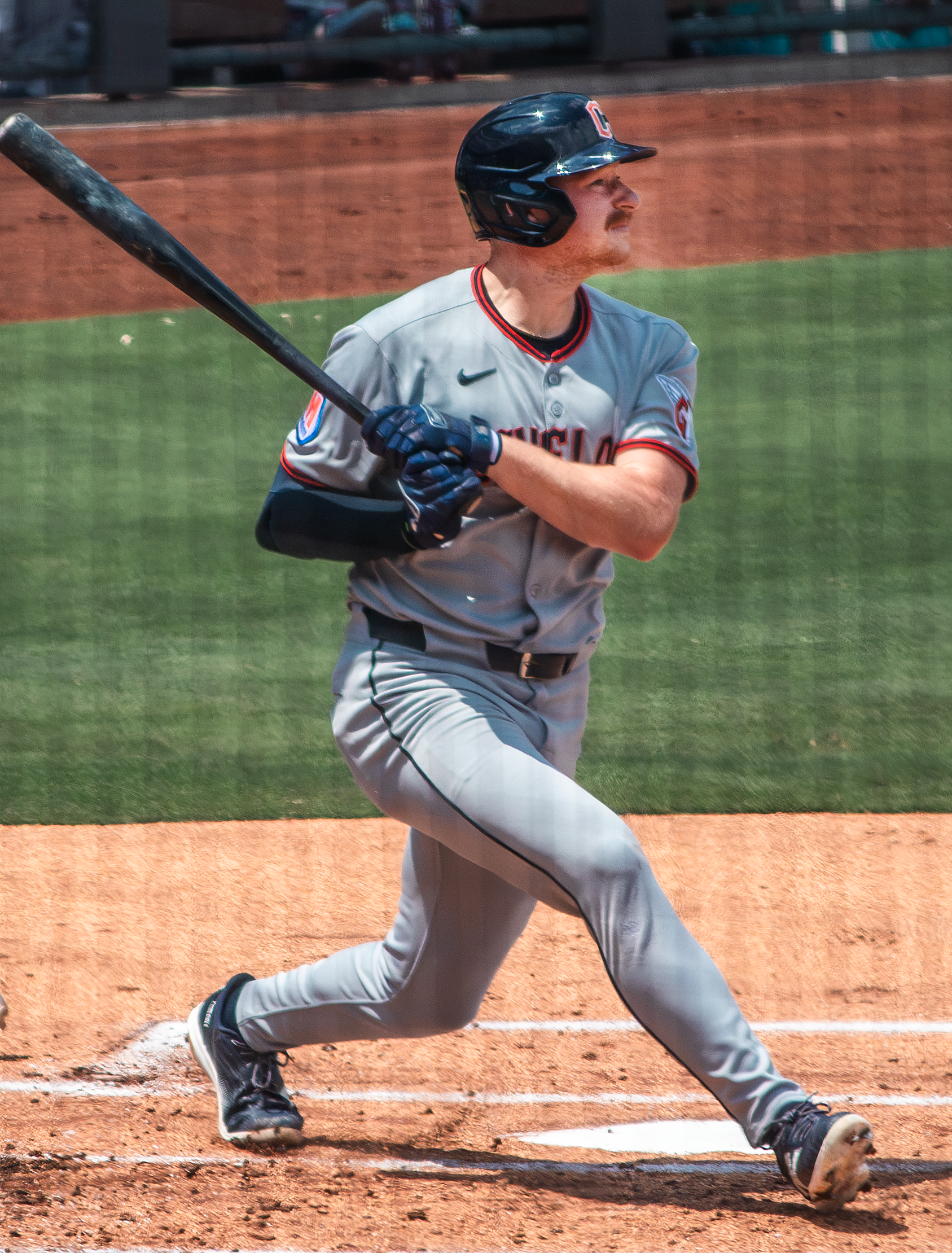
- Manzardo with the Cleveland Guardians

Cleveland Guardians – No. 9
- First baseman
- Born: July 18, 2000 (age 26); Coeur d'Alene, Idaho, U.S.
- Bats: Left Throws: Right

MLB debut
- May 6, 2024, for the Cleveland Guardians

MLB statistics (through 2026 season)
- Batting average: .228
- Home runs: 45
- Runs batted in: 124
- Stats at Baseball Reference

Teams
- Cleveland Guardians (2024–present)

Kyle Thomas Manzardo (born July 18, 2000) is an American professional baseball first baseman for the Cleveland Guardians of Major League Baseball (MLB). He made his MLB debut in 2024.

== Early life and amateur career ==
Manzardo grew up in Coeur d'Alene, Idaho, and attended Lake City High School, where he played baseball and basketball. As a senior, he had a .594 batting average and was named the Inland Empire League's most valuable player after batting .471 as a junior.

Manzardo attended Washington State University and played college baseball for the Washington State Cougars for three seasons. He hit for a .272 average as a freshman and led the team with 31 runs batted in (RBIs). After the season, Manzardo played collegiate summer baseball for the Portland Pickles of the West Coast League. He hit .435 through 16 games as a sophomore before the season was cut short due to the coronavirus pandemic. During the summer, he played for the Willmar Stingers of the Northwoods League. As a junior, Manzardo batted .365 with 11 home runs and 60 RBIs and was named a first team All-American by Collegiate Baseball.

== Professional career ==
=== Tampa Bay Rays ===
The Tampa Bay Rays selected Manzardo in the second round of the 2021 Major League Baseball draft. He signed and made his professional debut with the Rookie-level Florida Complex League Rays, slashing .349/.440/.605 with two home runs, eight RBIs, and five doubles over 13 games. Manzardo began the 2022 season with the High-A Bowling Green Hot Rods. He slashed .329/.436/.636 with 17 home runs in 63 games before being promoted to the Montgomery Biscuits of the Double-A Southern League.

=== Cleveland Guardians ===
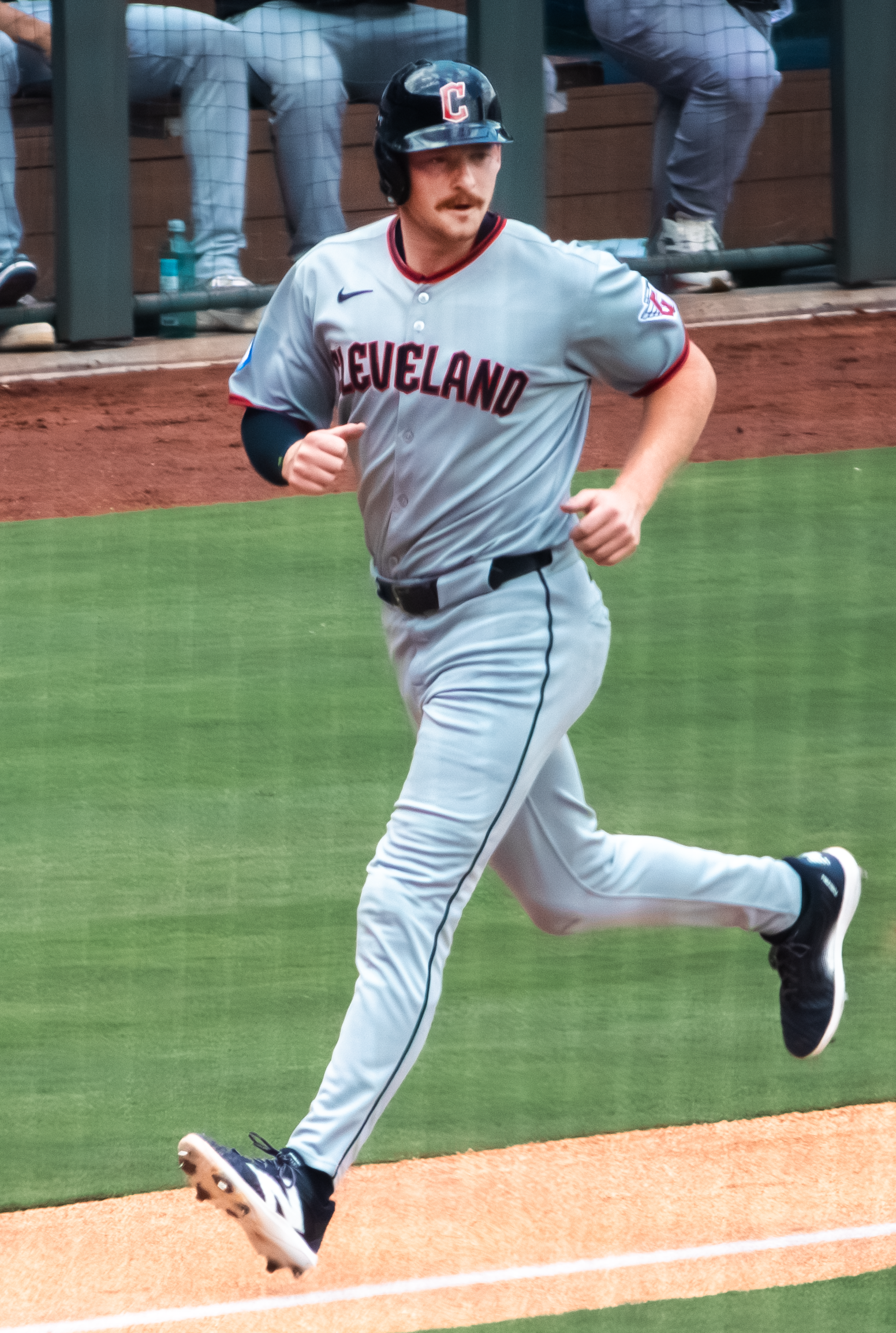
Kyle Manzardo of the Guardians

On July 31, 2023, the Rays traded Manzardo to the Cleveland Guardians for starting pitcher Aaron Civale. After the trade, he played for the Columbus Clippers of the Triple-A International League.

On May 6, 2024, Manzardo was selected to the 40-man roster and promoted to the major leagues for the first time. On June 18, Manzardo was sent back down to the Clippers.

On September 1, 2024, Manzardo was recalled to the Guardians active roster, and hit his first and second career home runs on the same day off of Pittsburgh Pirates starting pitcher Mitch Keller. In the 2025 season, he hit .234 with 27 home runs and 70 RBI in 142 games. On August 4, 2026, Manzardo and David Fry were optioned to Triple-AColumbus Clippers when the Guardians acquired Jo Adell from the Los Angeles Angels, Foster Griffin from the Washington Nationals, and Nathaniel Lowe from the Cincinnati Reds.

== Personal life ==
In July 2025, Manzardo was placed on the Guardians' family medical emergency list and missed three games to be with his family while his mother underwent heart transplant surgery.
