= 2023 Cleveland Guardians season =

2023 Cleveland Guardians
- League: American League
- Division: Central
- Ballpark: Progressive Field
- City: Cleveland, Ohio
- Record: 76–86 (.469)
- Divisional place: 3rd
- Owners: Larry Dolan
- President of baseball operations: Chris Antonetti
- General managers: Mike Chernoff
- Managers: Terry Francona
- Television: Bally Sports Great Lakes (Matt Underwood, Rick Manning, Pat Tabler)
- Radio: WTAM · WMMS; Cleveland Guardians Radio Network (Tom Hamilton, Jim Rosenhaus)

The 2023 Cleveland Guardians season was the 123rd season for the franchise, which competed in the American League of Major League Baseball (MLB). This was the franchise's second season using the "Guardians" nickname, and 11th and final season under manager Terry Francona, the longest-tenured manager in MLB entering the 2023 season. They entered the season as the defending American League Central champions. The team opened the regular season on March 30, losing on the road against the Seattle Mariners, and concluded the regular season on October 1, losing on the road against the Detroit Tigers. They failed to improve on their 92–70 record from the 2022 season, and failed to qualify for the playoffs.

The Cleveland Guardians drew an average home attendance of 23,513 in 78 home games in the 2023 MLB season. The total attendance was 1,834,068.

== Offseason ==
=== Rule changes ===
Pursuant to the CBA, new rule changes will be in place for the 2023 season:

- institution of a pitch clock between pitches;
- limits on pickoff attempts per plate appearance;
- limits on defensive shifts requiring two infielders to be on either side of second and be within the boundary of the infield; and
- larger bases (increased to 18-inch squares);

== Season standings ==
=== American League Central ===
AL Central
Team	W	L	Pct.	GB	Home	Road
Minnesota Twins	87	75	.537	—	47‍–‍34	40‍–‍41
Detroit Tigers	78	84	.481	9	37‍–‍44	41‍–‍40
Cleveland Guardians	76	86	.469	11	42‍–‍39	34‍–‍47
Chicago White Sox	61	101	.377	26	31‍–‍50	30‍–‍51
Kansas City Royals	56	106	.346	31	33‍–‍48	23‍–‍58

=== American League Wild Card ===
Division leaders
Team	W	L	Pct.
Baltimore Orioles	101	61	.623
Houston Astros	90	72	.556
Minnesota Twins	87	75	.537

Wild Card teams (Top 3 teams qualify for postseason)
Team	W	L	Pct.	GB
Tampa Bay Rays	99	63	.611	+10
Texas Rangers	90	72	.556	+1
Toronto Blue Jays	89	73	.549	—
Seattle Mariners	88	74	.543	1
New York Yankees	82	80	.506	7
Boston Red Sox	78	84	.481	11
Detroit Tigers	78	84	.481	11
Cleveland Guardians	76	86	.469	13
Los Angeles Angels	73	89	.451	16
Chicago White Sox	61	101	.377	28
Kansas City Royals	56	106	.346	33
Oakland Athletics	50	112	.309	39

=== Record vs. opponents ===
==== Record vs. American League ====
2023 American League record Source: MLB Standings Grid – 2023
Team	BAL	BOS	CWS	CLE	DET	HOU	KC	LAA	MIN	NYY	OAK	SEA	TB	TEX	TOR	NL
Baltimore	—	7–6	4–2	3–4	6–1	3–3	5–1	5–2	4–2	7–6	6–1	4–2	8–5	3–3	10–3	26–20
Boston	6–7	—	2–4	3–3	5–1	2–5	5–2	3–4	4–3	9–4	4–2	3–3	2–11	3–3	7–6	20–26
Chicago	2–4	4–2	—	8–5	5–8	3–4	6–7	3–4	4–9	4–2	3–4	2–4	1–6	1–5	0–6	15–31
Cleveland	4–3	3–3	5–8	—	4–9	2–4	7–6	3–4	7–6	2–4	5–1	4–3	3–3	3–3	4–3	20–26
Detroit	1–6	1–5	8–5	9–4	—	3–3	10–3	3–3	8–5	2–5	3–4	3–3	1–5	3–4	2–4	21–25
Houston	3–3	5–2	4–3	4–2	3–3	—	1–5	9–4	2–4	2–5	10–3	4–9	3–3	9–4	3–4	28–18
Kansas City	1–5	2–5	7–6	6–7	3–10	5–1	—	2–4	4–9	2–4	2–4	1–6	3–4	1–5	1–6	16–30
Los Angeles	2–5	4–3	4–3	4–3	3–3	4–9	4–2	—	3–3	4–2	7–6	5–8	2–4	6–7	2–4	19–27
Minnesota	2–4	3–4	9–4	6–7	5–8	4–2	9–4	3–3	—	4–3	5–1	3–4	1–5	5–2	3–3	25–21
New York	6–7	4–9	2–4	4–2	5–2	5–2	4–2	2–4	3–4	—	5–1	4–2	5–8	3–4	7–6	23–23
Oakland	1–6	2–4	4–3	1–5	4–3	3–10	4–2	6–7	1–5	1–5	—	1–12	2–5	4–9	2–4	14–32
Seattle	2–4	3–3	4–2	3–4	3–3	9–4	6–1	8–5	4–3	2–4	12–1	—	3–4	4–9	3–3	22–24
Tampa Bay	5–8	11–2	6–1	3–3	5–1	3–3	4–3	4–2	5–1	8–5	5–2	4–3	—	2–4	7–6	27–19
Texas	3–3	3–3	5–1	3–3	4–3	4–9	5–1	7–6	2–5	4–3	9–4	9–4	4–2	—	6–1	22–24
Toronto	3–10	6–7	6–0	3–4	4–2	4–3	6–1	4–2	3–3	6–7	4–2	3–3	6–7	1–6	—	30–16

Updated with the results of all games through October 1, 2023.

==== Record vs. National League ====
2023 American League record vs. National League Source: MLB Standings
Team	ARI	ATL	CHC	CIN	COL	LAD	MIA	MIL	NYM	PHI	PIT	SD	SF	STL	WSH
Baltimore	2–1	1–2	1–2	1–2	2–1	1–2	3–0	1–2	3–0	1–2	2–1	1–2	2–1	1–2	4–0
Boston	2–1	3–1	2–1	1–2	1–2	1–2	0–3	2–1	2–1	2–1	0–3	2–1	1–2	0–3	1–2
Chicago	1–2	2–1	1–3	2–1	1–2	1–2	1–2	0–3	1–2	1–2	1–2	0–3	1–2	1–2	1–2
Cleveland	1–2	1–2	2–1	2–2	1–2	1–2	1–2	1–2	0–3	2–1	2–1	1–2	1–2	2–1	2–1
Detroit	0–3	1–2	1–2	1–2	2–1	1–2	1–2	2–1	3–0	0–3	2–2	1–2	3–0	2–1	1–2
Houston	3–0	3–0	3–0	0–3	3–1	1–2	2–1	1–2	2–1	1–2	2–1	2–1	1–2	2–1	2–1
Kansas City	1–2	0–3	1–2	0–3	1–2	2–1	0–3	0–3	3–0	1–2	0–3	2–1	2–1	2–2	1–2
Los Angeles	1–2	1–2	3–0	0–3	1–2	0–4	0–3	1–2	2–1	1–2	2–1	0–3	2–1	3–0	2–1
Minnesota	3–0	0–3	2–1	2–1	2–1	1–2	1–2	2–2	2–1	2–1	2–1	2–1	1–2	2–1	1–2
New York	2–1	0–3	1–2	3–0	1–2	2–1	1–2	1–2	2–2	2–1	2–1	2–1	2–1	1–2	1–2
Oakland	1–2	2–1	0–3	1–2	2–1	0–3	0–3	3–0	0–3	0–3	2–1	0–3	2–2	1–2	0–3
Seattle	2–1	1–2	1–2	1–2	3–0	0–3	2–1	0–3	1–2	1–2	2–1	3–1	2–1	2–1	1–2
Tampa Bay	2–1	1–2	1–2	2–1	3–0	2–1	3–1	2–1	1–2	0–3	3–0	1–2	2–1	1–2	3–0
Texas	1–3	1–2	1–2	0–3	3–0	1–2	3–0	0–3	2–1	3–0	2–1	0–3	2–1	2–1	1–2
Toronto	3–0	3–0	1–2	2–1	2–1	2–1	2–1	2–1	3–0	1–3	3–0	1–2	2–1	1–2	2–1

Updated with the results of all games through October 1, 2023.

== Regular season ==
=== Game log ===
2023 Game Log: 76–86 (Home: 42–39; Away: 34–47)
March/April: 13–15 (Home: 4–8; Away: 9–7)

#	Date	Opponent	Score	Win	Loss	Save	Attendance	Record	Streak
1	March 30	@ Mariners	0–3	Sewald (1–0)	**Karinchak** (0–1)	Muñoz (1)	45,268	0–1	L1
2	March 31	@ Mariners	9–4	**Sandlin** (1–0)	Ray (0–1)	—	31,516	1–1	W1
3	April 1	@ Mariners	2–0	**Civale** (1–0)	Gilbert (0–1)	**Clase** (1)	44,250	2–1	W2
4	April 2	@ Mariners	6–5 (10)	**De Los Santos** (1–0)	Murfee (0–1)	**Stephan** (1)	34,045	3–1	W3
5	April 3	@ Athletics	12–11 (10)	**Clase** (1–0)	May (1–1)	**Morgan** (1)	3,035	4–1	W4
6	April 4	@ Athletics	3–4	May (2–1)	**Karinchak** (0–2)	—	3,407	4–2	L1
7	April 5	@ Athletics	6–4 (10)	**Morgan** (1–0)	Jackson (0–1)	**Clase** (2)	4,930	5–2	W1
8	April 7	Mariners	3–5	Murfee (1–1)	**Civale** (1–1)	Sewald (1)	34,821	5–3	L1
9	April 8	Mariners	2–3	Gonzales (1–0)	**Quantrill** (0–1)	Sewald (2)	17,489	5–4	L2
10	April 9	Mariners	7–6 (12)	**Herrin** (1–0)	Murfee (1–2)	—	12,716	6–4	W1
11	April 10	Yankees	3–2	**Bieber** (1–0)	Hamilton (0–1)	**Clase** (3)	19,278	7–4	W2
12	April 11	Yankees	2–11	Cole (3–0)	**Gaddis** (0–1)	—	20,164	7–5	L1
13	April 12	Yankees	3–4	Peralta (1–0)	**Clase** (1–1)	Holmes (4)	23,164	7–6	L2
14	April 14	@ Nationals	4–3	**Stephan** (1–0)	Edwards Jr. (0–1)	**Clase** (4)	21,367	8–6	W1
15	April 15	@ Nationals	6–4	**Plesac** (1–0)	Kuhl (0–1)	**Clase** (5)	24,909	9–6	W2
16	April 16	@ Nationals	6–7	Thompson (1–1)	**Sandlin** (1–1)	Finnegan (3)	21,929	9–7	L1
—	April 17	@ Tigers	Postponed (rain); Makeup April 18						
17	April 18 (1)	@ Tigers	3–4	Lange (1–0)	**Karinchak** (0–3)	—	see 2nd game	9–8	L2
18	April 18 (2)	@ Tigers	0–1	Rodríguez (1–2)	**Battenfield** (0–1)	Foley (1)	10,099	9–9	L3
19	April 19	@ Tigers	3–2	**Quantrill** (1–1)	Turnbull (1–3)	**Clase** (6)	11,230	10–9	W1
—	April 21	Marlins	Postponed (rain); Makeup April 22						
20	April 22 (1)	Marlins	1–6	Nardi (2–1)	**Bieber** (1–1)	—	see 2nd game	10–10	L1
21	April 22 (2)	Marlins	2–3	Garrett (1–0)	**Plesac** (1–1)	Puk (4)	14,478	10–11	L2
22	April 23	Marlins	7–4	**Allen** (1–0)	Luzardo (2–1)	**Clase** (7)	12,664	11–11	W1
23	April 24	Rockies	0–6	Gomber (1–4)	**Quantrill** (1–2)	—	9,258	11–12	L1
24	April 25	Rockies	1–5	Feltner (2–2)	**Battenfield** (0–2)	—	9,493	11–13	L2
25	April 26	Rockies	4–1	**Bibee** (1–0)	Márquez (2–2)	**Clase** (8)	9,841	12–13	W1
26	April 28	@ Red Sox	5–2	**Bieber** (2–1)	Pivetta (1–2)	**Clase** (9)	30,578	13–13	W2
27	April 29	@ Red Sox	7–8 (10)	Bernardino (1–0)	**Clase** (1–2)	—	31,717	13–14	L1
28	April 30	@ Red Sox	1–7	Sale (2–2)	**Allen** (1–1)	—	29,395	13–15	L2

May: 12–15 (Home: 8–7; Away: 4–8)

#	Date	Opponent	Score	Win	Loss	Save	Attendance	Record	Streak
29	May 1	@ Yankees	3–2	**De Los Santos** (2–0)	Holmes (0–2)	**Clase** (10)	33,414	14–15	W1
30	May 2	@ Yankees	2–4	Peralta (2–0)	**Karinchak** (0–4)	King (2)	32,521	14–16	L1
31	May 3	@ Yankees	3–4 (10)	Abreu (1–0)	**Stephan** (1–1)	—	36,060	14–17	L2
32	May 5	Twins	0–2	Ober (2–0)	**Battenfield** (0–3)	Durán (7)	17,849	14–18	L3
33	May 6	Twins	4–3	**Stephan** (2–1)	Alcalá (0–1)	**Clase** (11)	20,795	15–18	W1
34	May 7	Twins	2–0	**Quantrill** (2–2)	Ryan (5–1)	**Clase** (12)	17,477	16–18	W2
35	May 8	Tigers	2–6	Wentz (1–3)	**Bibee** (1–1)	—	12,509	16–19	L1
36	May 9	Tigers	2–0	**Bieber** (3–1)	Lorenzen (1–2)	**Clase** (13)	13,096	17–19	W1
37	May 10	Tigers	0–5	Rodríguez (4–2)	**Battenfield** (0–4)	—	16,128	17–20	L1
38	May 12	Angels	4–5	Moore (3–1)	**Clase** (1–3)	Estévez (9)	22,550	17–21	L2
39	May 13	Angels	8–6	**Morgan** (2–0)	Tepera (2–2)	**Stephan** (2)	27,644	18–21	W1
40	May 14	Angels	4–3	**Karinchak** (1–4)	Sandoval (3–2)	**Clase** (14)	23,175	19–21	W2
41	May 16	@ White Sox	3–8	Lynn (2–5)	**Bieber** (3–2)	—	18,459	19–22	L1
42	May 17	@ White Sox	2–7	Clevinger (3–3)	**Battenfield** (0–5)	—	12,241	19–23	L2
43	May 18	@ White Sox	3–1	**Sandlin** (2–1)	Cease (2–3)	**Clase** (15)	11,900	20–23	W1
44	May 19	@ Mets	9–10 (10)	Smith (3–1)	**Clase** (1–4)	—	35,010	20–24	L1
--	May 20	@ Mets	Postponed (rain); Makeup May 21						
45	May 21	@ Mets	4–5	Robertson (2–0)	**Stephan** (2–2)	—	39,995	20–25	L2
46	May 21	@ Mets	1–2	Verlander (2–2)	**Bieber** (3–3)	Raley (1)	29,862	20–26	L3
47	May 22	White Sox	3–0	**Gaddis** (1–1)	Scholtens (0–2)	**Clase** (16)	13,878	21–26	W1
48	May 23	White Sox	2–4	Cease (3–3)	**Allen** (1–2)	Graveman (4)	14,524	21–27	L1
49	May 24	White Sox	0–6	Kopech (3–4)	**Quantrill** (2–3)	—	17,767	21–28	L2
50	May 26	Cardinals	4–3	**Bieber** (4–3)	Liberatore (1–1)	**Clase** (17)	31,303	22–28	W1
51	May 27	Cardinals	1–2 (10)	Helsley (3–3)	**Sandlin** (2–2)	Gallegos (6)	32,224	22–29	L1
52	May 28	Cardinals	4–3	**Curry** (1–0)	Helsley (3–4)	—	27,398	23–29	W1
53	May 29	@ Orioles	5–0	**Allen** (2–2)	Wells (3–2)	—	25,249	24–29	W2
54	May 30	@ Orioles	5–8	Gibson (7–3)	**Quantrill** (2–4)	Bautista (14)	11,709	24–30	L1
55	May 31	@ Orioles	12–8	**Curry** (2–0)	Givens (0–1)	—	11,304	25–30	W1

June: 14–12 (Home: 8–4; Away: 6–8)

#	Date	Opponent	Score	Win	Loss	Save	Attendance	Record	Streak
56	June 1	@ Twins	6–7	Jax (3–6)	**Morgan** (2–1)	—	16,788	25–31	L1
57	June 2	@ Twins	0–1	Stewart (2–0)	**Sandlin** (2–3)	Durán (8)	26,818	25–32	L2
58	June 3	@ Twins	4–2	**Allen** (3–2)	Gray (4–1)	**Clase** (18)	27,153	26–32	W1
59	June 4	@ Twins	2–1	**Karinchak** (2–4)	Ryan (7–3)	**Clase** (19)	23,629	27–32	W2
60	June 6	Red Sox	4–5	Paxton (2–1)	**De Los Santos** (2–1)	Jansen (13)	21,471	27–33	L1
61	June 7	Red Sox	5–2	**Bibee** (2–1)	Crawford (1–3)	**Clase** (20)	19,444	28–33	W1
62	June 8	Red Sox	10–3	**Civale** (2–1)	Dermody (0–1)	—	21,473	29–33	W2
63	June 9	Astros	10–9 (14)	**Curry** (3–0)	Martinez (1–2)	—	31,787	30–33	W3
64	June 10	Astros	4–6	France (2–1)	**McKenzie** (0–1)	Pressly (12)	35,087	30–34	L1
65	June 11	Astros	5–0	**Bieber** (5–3)	Bielak (3–3)	—	26,318	31–34	W1
66	June 13	@ Padres	3–6	Musgrove (4–2)	**Bibee** (2–2)	Hader (16)	40,197	31–35	L1
67	June 14	@ Padres	0–5	Wacha (7–2)	**Civale** (2–2)	—	43,660	31–36	L2
68	June 15	@ Padres	8–6	**Stephan** (3–2)	Weathers (1–5)	**Clase** (21)	41,864	32–36	W1
69	June 16	@ Diamondbacks	1–5	Gallen (8–2)	**Toussaint** (0–1)	—	27,203	32–37	L1
70	June 17	@ Diamondbacks	3–6	Castro (4–2)	**Bieber** (5–4)	McGough (3)	25,471	32–38	L2
71	June 18	@ Diamondbacks	12–3	**Bibee** (3–2)	Davies (1–3)	—	42,031	33–38	W1
72	June 20	Athletics	3–2 (10)	**De Los Santos** (3–1)	May (2–4)	—	17,773	34–38	W2
73	June 21	Athletics	7–6	**Morgan** (3–1)	Pruitt (1–5)	**Clase** (22)	17,853	35–38	W3
74	June 22	Athletics	6–1	**Sandlin** (3–3)	Sears (1–5)	—	23,969	36–38	W4
75	June 23	Brewers	1–7	Miley (5–2)	**Bieber** (5–5)	—	30,056	36–39	L1
76	June 24	Brewers	4-2	**Bibee** (4–2)	Peralta (5–7)	**Clase** (23)	32,349	37-39	W1
77	June 25	Brewers	4–5 (10)	Williams (4–1)	**Stephan** (3–3)	Peguero (1)	24,701	37–40	L1
78	June 27	@ Royals	2–1	**Stephan** (4–3)	Barlow (2–4)	**Clase** (24)	15,718	38–40	W1
79	June 28	@ Royals	14–1	**Sandlin** (4–3)	Cox (0–1)	—	11,978	39–40	W2
80	June 29	@ Royals	3–4 (10)	Chapman (4–2)	**Clase** (1–5)	—	12,414	39–41	L1
81	June 30	@ Cubs	1–10	Steele (9–2)	**Quantrill** (2–5)	—	32,230	39–42	L2

July: 14–12 (Home: 8–5; Away: 6–7)

#	Date	Opponent	Score	Win	Loss	Save	Attendance	Record	Streak
82	July 1	@ Cubs	6–0	**Bibee** (5–2)	Stroman (9–6)	—	34,342	40–42	W1
83	July 2	@ Cubs	8–6 (10)	**Hentges** (1–0)	Alzolay (1–4)	—	38,392	41–42	W2
84	July 3	Braves	2–4	Elder (7–1)	**Williams** (0–1)	Iglesias (15)	38,106	41–43	L1
85	July 4	Braves	6–5 (10)	**De Los Santos** (4–1)	Iglesias (3–3)	—	24,808	42–43	W1
86	July 5	Braves	1–8	Tonkin (5–2)	**Quantrill** (2–6)	—	23,862	42–44	L1
87	July 6	Royals	6–1	**Morgan** (4–1)	Garrett (0–1)	—	17,464	43–44	W1
88	July 7	Royals	3–0	**Civale** (3–2)	Lynch (2–4)	**Clase** (25)	29,990	44–44	W2
89	July 8	Royals	10–6	**Williams** (1–1)	Singer (5–8)	—	30,864	45–44	W3
90	July 9	Royals	1–4	Yarbrough (2–4)	**Bieber** (5–6)	Barlow (11)	25,911	45–45	L1
**93rd All-Star Game: Seattle, WA**
91	July 14	@ Rangers	4–12	Burke (3–2)	**Hentges** (1–1)	—	33,863	45–46	L2
92	July 15	@ Rangers	0–2	Heaney (6–6)	**Williams** (1–2)	Chapman (3)	37,730	45–47	L3
93	July 16	@ Rangers	5–6	Bradford (2–1)	**Stephan** (4–4)	Smith (16)	33,957	45–48	L4
94	July 17	@ Pirates	11–0	**Kelly** (1–0)	Priester (0–1)	—	20,080	46–48	W1
95	July 18	@ Pirates	10–1	**Allen** (4–2)	Keller (9–5)	—	21,622	47–48	W2
96	July 19	@ Pirates	5–7	Borucki (1–0)	**Hentges** (1–2)	Bednar (18)	26,541	47–49	L1
97	July 21	Phillies	6–5	**Stephan** (5–4)	Suárez (2–5)	**Clase** (26)	38,260	48–49	W1
98	July 22	Phillies	1–0	**Bibee** (6–2)	Wheeler (7–5)	**Clase** (27)	37,937	49–49	W2
99	July 23	Phillies	5–8 (10)	Kimbrel (6–1)	**Herrin** (1–1)	Marte (2)	31,806	49–50	L1
100	July 24	Royals	3–5	Yarbrough (3–5)	**Allen** (4–3)	Barlow (12)	19,630	49–51	L2
101	July 25	Royals	5–1	**Civale** (4–2)	Greinke (1–11)	—	22,177	50–51	W1
102	July 26	Royals	8–3	**Sandlin** (5–3)	Marsh (0–5)	—	26,699	51–51	W2
103	July 27	@ White Sox	6–3	**Bibee** (7–2)	Cease (4–4)	**Clase** (28)	20,893	52–51	W3
104	July 28	@ White Sox	0–3	Toussaint (1–3)	**Curry** (3–1)	Santos (2)	26,654	52–52	L1
105	July 29	@ White Sox	2–7	Clevinger (4–4)	**Allen** (4–4)	—	26,299	52–53	L2
106	July 30	@ White Sox	5–0	**Civale** (5–2)	Kopech (4–10)	—	28,096	53–53	W1
107	July 31	@ Astros	3–7	France (7–3)	**Morgan** (4–2)	Pressly (25)	30,165	53–54	L1

August: 11–16 (Home: 5–9; Away: 6–7)

#	Date	Opponent	Score	Win	Loss	Save	Attendance	Record	Streak
108	August 1	@ Astros	0–2	Valdez (9–7)	**Williams** (1–3)	—	33,703	53–55	L2
109	August 2	@ Astros	2–3	Maton (3–3)	**Sandlin** (5–4)	Pressly (26)	37,522	53–56	L3
110	August 4	White Sox	4–2	**Allen** (5–4)	Clevinger (4–5)	**Clase** (29)	37,056	54–56	W1
111	August 5	White Sox	4–7	Kopech (5–10)	**Syndergaard** (1–5)	—	35,823	54–57	L1
112	August 6	White Sox	3–5	Peralta (1–0)	**Clase** (1–6)	Lambert (1)	27,305	54–58	L2
113	August 7	Blue Jays	1–3	Swanson (3–2)	**De Los Santos** (4–2)	Hicks (10)	18,198	54–59	L3
114	August 8	Blue Jays	1–0	**Bibee** (8–2)	Kikuchi (9–4)	**Clase** (30)	19,467	55–59	W1
115	August 9	Blue Jays	0–1	Gausman (9–6)	**Allen** (5–5)	Hicks (11)	21,227	55–60	L1
116	August 10	Blue Jays	4–3	**Syndergaard** (2–5)	Manoah (3–9)	**Clase** (31)	23,905	56–60	W1
117	August 11	@ Rays	8–9	Stephenson (2–4)	**Sandlin** (5–5)	—	19,625	56–61	L1
118	August 12	@ Rays	5–6	Fleming (2–0)	**Clase** (1–7)	—	25,025	56–62	L2
119	August 13	@ Rays	9–2	**Bibee** (9–2)	Eflin (12–7)	—	22,163	57–62	W1
120	August 15	@ Reds	3–0	**Allen** (6–5)	Ashcraft (6–8)	**Clase** (32)	26,290	58–62	W2
121	August 16	@ Reds	2–7	Abbott (8–3)	**Syndergaard** (2–6)	—	19,797	58–63	L1
—	August 17	Tigers	Postponed (rain); Makeup August 18						
122	August 18 (1)	Tigers	2–4	Skubal (3–2)	**Williams** (1–4)	Foley (6)	see 2nd game	58–64	L2
123	August 18 (2)	Tigers	4–1	**De Los Santos** (5–2)	Cisnero (2–4)	**Clase** (33)	31,556	59–64	W1
124	August 19	Tigers	3–4	Manning (5–4)	**Bibee** (9–3)	Foley (7)	32,641	59–65	L1
125	August 20	Tigers	1–4	Rodríguez (9–6)	**Allen** (6–6)	Lange (18)	26,824	59–66	L2
126	August 22	Dodgers	8–3	**Hentges** (2–2)	Miller (7–3)	—	22,173	60–66	W1
—	August 23	Dodgers	Suspended (rain); Completion August 24						
127	August 24 (1)	Dodgers	1–6	Varland (1–0)	**Curry** (3–2)	—		60–67	L1
128	August 24 (2)	Dodgers	3–9	Pepiot (1–0)	**Williams** (1–5)	—	23,533	60–68	L2
129	August 25	@ Blue Jays	5–2	**Bibee** (10–3)	Bassitt (12–7)	**Clase** (34)	40,755	61–68	W1
130	August 26	@ Blue Jays	3–8	Ryu (3–1)	**Allen** (6–7)	—	41,924	61–69	L1
131	August 27	@ Blue Jays	10–7 (11)	**Clase** (2–7)	Jackson (3–1)	—	41,978	62–69	W1
132	August 28	@ Twins	6–10	Funderburk (1–0)	**Curry** (3–3)	Winder (1)	20,323	62–70	L1
133	August 29	@ Twins	4–2	**Gaddis** (2–1)	López (9–7)	**Clase** (35)	23,433	63–70	W1
134	August 30	@ Twins	5–2 (10)	**Stephan** (6–4)	Pagán (5–2)	**Clase** (36)	20,169	64–70	W2

September/October: 12–16 (Home: 9–6; Away: 3–10)

#	Date	Opponent	Score	Win	Loss	Save	Attendance	Record	Streak
135	September 1	Rays	3–2	**Morgan** (5–2)	Glasnow (7–5)	**Clase** (37)	25,685	65–70	W3
136	September 2	Rays	7–6 (11)	**Hentges** (3–2)	Devenski (3–3)	—	27,788	66–70	W4
137	September 3	Rays	2–6	Poche (10–3)	**Stephan** (6–5)	Fairbanks (19)	25,556	66–71	L1
138	September 4	Twins	6–20	López (10–7)	**Giolito** (7–12)	—	17,359	66–72	L2
139	September 5	Twins	3–8	Jax (6–8)	**Stephan** (6–6)	—	20,224	66–73	L3
140	September 6	Twins	2–1	**Williams** (2–5)	Ryan (10–9)	**Clase** (38)	16,148	67–73	W1
141	September 7	@ Angels	2–3	Soriano (1–2)	**Clase** (2–8)	—	24,288	67–74	L1
142	September 8	@ Angels	6–3	**Allen** (7–7)	Canning (7–6)	**Clase** (39)	34,209	68–74	W1
143	September 9	@ Angels	2–6	Anderson (6–6)	**Giolito** (7–13)	—	27,233	68–75	L1
144	September 10	@ Angels	1–2	Rosenberg (1–1)	**Bibee** (10–4)	Estévez (30)	26,134	68–76	L2
145	September 11	@ Giants	4–5 (10)	Jackson (2–2)	**Clase** (2–9)	—	20,705	68–77	L3
146	September 12	@ Giants	3–1	**Quantrill** (3–6)	Manaea (5–6)	**Clase** (40)	23,541	69–77	W1
147	September 13	@ Giants	5–6 (10)	Doval (6–4)	**Curry** (3–4)	—	26,218	69–78	L1
148	September 15	Rangers	12–3	**Giolito** (8–13)	Gray (8–8)	—	21,043	70–78	W1
149	September 16	Rangers	2–1	**López** (3–7)	Smith (2–6)	**Clase** (41)	25,263	71–78	W2
150	September 17	Rangers	9–2	**Williams** (3–5)	Bradford (4–2)	—	19,361	72–78	W3
151	September 18	@ Royals	4–6	Kowar (2–0)	**Stephan** (6–7)	McArthur (1)	9,736	72–79	L1
152	September 19	@ Royals	6–7	Marsh (2–8)	**Allen** (7–8)	Snider (1)	15,254	72–80	L2
153	September 20	@ Royals	2–6	Zerpa (3–3)	**Giolito** (8–14)	—	12,162	72–81	L3
154	September 21	Orioles	5–2	**Stephan** (7–7)	Pérez (4–2)	**Clase** (42)	25,226	73–81	W1
155	September 22	Orioles	9–8	**Clase** (3–9)	Canó (1–4)	—	22,567	74–81	W2
156	September 23	Orioles	1–2	Means (1–1)	**Quantrill** (3–7)	Pérez (3)	28,271	74–82	L1
157	September 24	Orioles	1–5	Gibson (15–9)	**McKenzie** (0–2)	—	20,287	74–83	L2
158	September 26	Reds	7–11	Moll (2–3)	**Karinchak** (2–5)	Díaz (38)	29,189	74–84	L3
159	September 27	Reds	4–3	**Bieber** (6–6)	Abbott (8–6)	**Clase** (43)	28,915	75–84	W1
160	September 29	@ Tigers	7–5	**Quantrill** (4–7)	Wentz (3–13)	**Clase** (44)	30,053	76–84	W2
161	September 30	@ Tigers	0–8	Brieske (2–3)	**McKenzie** (0–3)	—	40,224	76–85	L1
162	October 1	@ Tigers	2–5	Rodríguez (13–9)	**Giolito** (8–15)	Lange (26)	41,425	76–86	L2

Legend: = Win = Loss = Postponement
Bold = Guardians team member

== Roster ==
2023 Cleveland Guardians
Roster
Pitchers: 41 Logan Allen; 50 Peyton Battenfield; 61 Tanner Bibee; 57 Shane Bieber; 43 Aaron Civale; 48 Emmanuel Clase; 44 Xzavion Curry; 62 Enyel De Los Santos; 33 Hunter Gaddis; 27 Lucas Giolito; 31 Sam Hentges; 29 Tim Herrin; 99 James Karinchak; 58 Michael Kelly; 40 Reynaldo López; 24 Triston McKenzie; 55 Matt Moore; 49 Eli Morgan; 36 Cody Morris; 53 Daniel Norris; 45 Konnor Pilkington; 34 Zach Plesac; 47 Cal Quantrill; 52 Nick Sandlin; 37 Trevor Stephan; 34 Noah Syndergaard; 56 Touki Toussaint; 63 Gavin Williams	Catchers: 32 Zack Collins; 12 David Fry; 35 Cam Gallagher; 9 Eric Haase; 23 Bo Naylor; 46 Meibrys Viloria; 10 Mike Zunino; Infielders: 13 Gabriel Arias; 55 Josh Bell; 2 Tyler Freeman; 0 Andrés Giménez; 22 Josh Naylor; 11 José Ramírez; 6 Brayan Rocchio; 1 Amed Rosario; 8 José Tena	Outfielders: 17 Will Brennan; 56 Kole Calhoun; 39 Oscar González; 38 Steven Kwan; 10 Ramón Laureano; 7 Myles Straw	Manager: 77 Terry Francona; Coaches: 15 Sandy Alomar Jr. (first base/catchers); 87 Mike Barnett (replay coordinator); 83 Rigo Beltrán (bullpen); 64 Armando Camacaro (bullpen catcher/staff assistant); 85 Jason Esposito (run production coordinator); 30 DeMarlo Hale (bench); 84 J. T. Maguire (staff assistant); 82 Ricky Pacione (bullpen catcher/staff assistant); 60 Vic Rodriguez (assistant hitting); 16 Mike Sarbaugh (third base/infield); 86 Joe Torres (assistant pitching); 45 Chris Valaika (hitting); 51 Carl Willis (pitching)

== Player stats ==
Note = Individual team leaders in each category are in bold.

- Indicates league leader.

=== Batting ===
Note: G = Games played; AB = At bats; R = Runs scored; H = Hits; 2B = Doubles; 3B = Triples; HR = Home runs; RBI = Runs batted in; AVG = Batting average; SB = Stolen bases

Player	G	AB	R	H	2B	3B	HR	RBI	AVG	SB
Gabriel Arias	122	315	36	66	15	0	10	26	.210	3
Josh Bell	97	347	26	81	19	0	11	48	.233	0
Will Brennan	139	432	41	115	24	0	5	41	.266	13
Kole Calhoun	43	157	18	34	7	0	6	25	.217	0
Zack Collins	2	4	0	2	0	0	0	0	.500	0
Tyler Freeman	64	153	20	37	7	0	4	18	.242	5
David Fry	57	101	12	24	6	0	4	15	.238	2
Cam Gallagher	56	143	6	18	6	0	0	7	.126	0
Andrés Giménez	153	557	76	140	27	5	15	62	.251	**30**
Oscar González	54	173	15	37	7	2	2	12	.214	0
Eric Haase	3	10	0	2	0	0	0	0	.200	1
Steven Kwan	**158**	**638**	**93**	171	**36**	7	5	54	.268	21
Ramón Laureano	41	136	22	33	8	1	3	14	.243	4
Bo Naylor	67	198	33	47	13	0	11	32	.237	5
Josh Naylor	121	452	52	139	31	0	17	**97**	.308	10
José Ramírez	156	611	87	**172**	**36**	5	**24**	80	**.282**	28
Brayan Rocchio	23	81	9	20	6	0	0	8	.247	0
Amed Rosario	94	385	51	102	19	**6**	3	40	.265	9
Myles Straw	147	462	52	110	18	3	1	29	.238	20
José Tena	18	31	2	7	2	0	0	3	.226	0
Meibrys Viloria	10	3	0	0	0	0	0	0	.000	0
Mike Zunino	42	124	11	22	7	0	3	11	.177	0
**Totals**	**162**	**5513**	**662**	**1379**	**294**	**29**	**124**	**622**	**.250**	**151**

=== Pitching ===
Note: W = Wins; L = Losses; ERA = Earned run average; G = Games pitched; GS = Games started; SV = Saves; IP = Innings pitched; H = Hits allowed; R = Runs allowed; ER = Earned runs allowed; BB = Walks allowed; K = Strikeouts

Player	W	L	ERA	G	GS	SV	IP	H	R	ER	BB	K
Logan Allen	7	8	3.81	24	24	0	125.1	**127**	55	53	**48**	119
Peyton Battenfield	0	5	5.19	7	6	0	34.2	34	22	20	12	27
Tanner Bibee	**10**	4	2.98	25	**25**	0	**142.0**	122	49	47	45	**141**
Shane Bieber	6	6	3.80	21	21	0	128.0	124	56	54	34	107
Aaron Civale	5	2	2.34	13	13	0	77.0	58	20	20	22	58
Emmanuel Clase	3	**9**	3.22	**75**	0	**44***	72.2	68	37	26	16	64
Xzavion Curry	3	4	4.07	41	9	0	95.0	98	47	43	30	67
Enyel De Los Santos	5	2	3.29	70	0	0	65.2	50	26	24	25	62
David Fry	0	0	12.60	2	0	0	5.0	10	7	7	1	0
Hunter Gaddis	2	1	4.50	11	7	0	42.0	41	21	21	14	24
Lucas Giolito	1	4	7.04	6	6	0	30.2	30	27	24	16	39
Sam Hentges	3	2	3.61	56	0	0	52.1	53	24	21	18	56
Tim Herrin	1	1	5.53	23	0	0	27.2	29	18	17	12	32
James Karinchak	2	5	4.15	44	0	0	39.0	25	18	18	28	52
Michael Kelly	1	0	3.78	14	0	0	16.2	13	8	7	9	16
Reynaldo López	1	0	0.00	12	0	0	11.0	5	0	0	4	12
Triston McKenzie	0	3	5.06	4	4	0	16.0	12	9	9	13	16
Matt Moore	0	0	3.86	5	0	0	4.2	9	2	2	2	8
Eli Morgan	5	2	4.01	61	0	1	67.1	73	37	30	24	75
Cody Morris	0	0	6.75	6	0	0	8.0	10	6	6	6	9
Daniel Norris	0	0	5.68	7	0	0	12.2	10	11	8	12	11
Konnor Pilkington	0	0	0.00	1	0	0	2.0	1	0	0	1	2
Zach Plesac	1	1	7.59	5	5	0	21.1	37	20	18	5	14
Cal Quantrill	4	7	5.24	19	19	0	99.2	111	**59**	**58**	35	58
Nick Sandlin	5	5	3.75	61	0	0	60.0	38	28	25	24	66
Trevor Stephan	7	7	4.06	71	0	2	68.2	63	35	31	26	75
Noah Syndergaard	1	2	5.40	6	6	0	33.1	33	21	20	10	18
Touki Toussaint	0	1	4.91	1	1	0	3.2	3	2	2	5	2
Gavin Williams	3	5	3.29	16	16	0	82.0	66	32	30	37	81
**Totals**	**76**	**86**	**3.98**	**162**	**162**	**47**	**1444.0**	**1353**	**697**	**639**	**534**	**1311**

Note: No qualifiers for league ERA title as no pitchers averaged 1 inning pitched per game (162 innings).

== Farm system ==
Level	Team	League	Manager
AAA	Columbus Clippers	International League	Andy Tracy
AA	Akron RubberDucks	Eastern League	Rouglas Odor
High-A	Lake County Captains	Midwest League	
Low–A	Lynchburg Hillcats	Carolina League	
Rookie	ACL Guardians	Arizona Complex League	
Rookie	DSL Guardians Blue	Dominican Summer League	
Rookie	DSL Guardians Red	Dominican Summer League	
