= Spencer Horwitz =

American baseball player (born 1997)

Pittsburgh Pirates – No. 2
- First baseman / Second baseman
- Born: November 14, 1997 (age 28); Timonium, Maryland, U.S.
- Bats: Left Throws: Right

MLB debut
- June 18, 2023, for the Toronto Blue Jays

MLB statistics (through 2026 season)
- Batting average: .260
- Home runs: 34
- Runs batted in: 147
- Stats at Baseball Reference

Teams
- Toronto Blue Jays (2023–2024); Pittsburgh Pirates (2025–present)

Spencer Elliott Horwitz (born November 14, 1997) is an American professional baseball first baseman and second baseman for the Pittsburgh Pirates of Major League Baseball (MLB). He has previously played in MLB for the Toronto Blue Jays. The Blue Jays selected him in the 24th round of the 2019 MLB draft, and he made his MLB debut in 2023. Horwitz played for Team Israel in the 2023 World Baseball Classic.

== Early life and high school ==
Horwitz is the son of David and Laura Horwitz, and has a brother, Ben. He was born in Timonium, Maryland. He is Jewish.

Horwitz played both baseball and hockey at St. Paul's School for Boys in Brooklandville, Maryland. In baseball, Horwitz was a 2016 Maryland Interscholastic Athletic Association (MIAA) First Team selection, and twice MIAA All-Conference as a catcher. In hockey he played as a defenseman, and led the high school to two state championships.

== College ==
Horwitz played college baseball at Radford University, primarily at first base. In 2017 as a freshman, Horwitz batted .311/.384/.481 in 206 at bats, and was named Big South Conference Second Team, and a Collegiate Baseball Freshman All American.

In 2018, Horwitz batted .288/.386/.443 in 219 at bats, had 43 runs batted in (RBIs) (7th in the conference), and was again named Big South Conference Second Team. After the 2018 season, he played collegiate summer baseball with the Bourne Braves of the Cape Cod Baseball League. In 2019 he batted .268/.392/.465 with 10 home runs and a league-leading 49 walks alongside 29 strikeouts; he was named Big South Conference Honorable Mention.

== Professional career ==
=== Toronto Blue Jays ===
==== 2019–22 ====
The Toronto Blue Jays selected Horwitz in the 24th round of the 2019 Major League Baseball draft. He signed for a $100,000 signing bonus.

Horwitz spent his first professional season in 2019 with the Rookie League Bluefield Blue Jays and Low–A Vancouver Canadians. He batted a combined .307/.368/.440 with 4 home runs and 52 RBIs. He was named a 2019 Appalachian League Post-Season All-Star. Horwitz did not play in 2020 due to the Minor League Baseball season being cancelled because of the COVID-19 pandemic.

Horwitz returned in 2021 to play for the now High–A Vancouver Canadians and for the Double–A New Hampshire Fisher Cats. He batted a combined .294/.400/.462 with 12 home runs and 66 RBIs, with more walks (70) than strikeouts (66), while leading the High-A West in doubles (28; tied) and walks (70) in 389 at bats. He had a 28-game hitting streak, breaking a 60-year-old Northwest League/High A-West League record. He was named the Northwest League’s 2021 Top MLB Prospect, and a Northwest League Post-Season All Star.

After the season, Horwitz played for the Mesa Solar Sox in the Arizona Fall League, where he batted .375/.460/.484 in 64 at bats.He was named an Arizona Fall League Rising Star. MLB.com named him Toronto's #30 prospect.

Horwitz started 2022 with New Hampshire, and was named Eastern League Player of the Week on June 13. He was promoted to the Triple–A Buffalo Bisons following a strong start to the season. Across both levels in 2022, he batted .275/.391/.452 in 403 at bats with 77 runs, 12 home runs, and 51 RBIs, while playing 73 games at first base and 20 games in left field.

==== 2023 ====
On November 15, 2022, Horwitz was added to the Blue Jays' 40-man roster. He was optioned to Triple-A Buffalo to begin the 2023 season. Baseball America named him the Jays’ #14 prospect.

Following a hot start in Triple-A, Horwitz was promoted to the major leagues for the first time on June 16, 2023. On June 18, 2023, he made his MLB debut with the Blue Jays, and collected his first MLB hit off of Texas Rangers pitcher Jon Gray. He hit his first major-league home run (a solo shot) in a 7-5 win against the Colorado Rockies on September 3, 2023. In 39 at bats for the Blue Jays, he hit .256/.341/.385.

During his time in Triple-A, Horwitz batted .337 (10th in the league)/.450 (4th)/.495 with 30 doubles (tied for 7th), six sacrifice flies (tied for 3rd) in 392 at bats, and three intentional walks (tied for league lead), with more walks (78; 4th in the league) than strikeouts (72). He was voted Bisons' 2023 team MVP and the International League's top defensive infielder in a Baseball America poll.

==== 2024 ====
In January 2024, MLB Pipeline ranked Horwitz #9 on its Top 10 1B Prospects list. He was optioned to Triple–A Buffalo to begin the 2024 season, where he batted .335 (5th in the league))/.456 (3rd in the league)/.514 in 212 at bats, with more walks (44) than strikeouts (41). Horwitz was called up to the Blue Jays on June 6, 2024, after the club designated Cavan Biggio for assignment.

In 2024 for the Blue Jays, he batted .265/.357/.433 with 46 runs, 12 home runs, and 40 RBIs in 328 at bats. On defense, he split time between first base (41 games), second base (39 games), and designated hitter (17 games). Among qualified AL rookies, Horwitz ranked first in OPS and seventh in WAR.

=== Pittsburgh Pirates ===
==== 2025 season ====
On December 10, 2024, Horwitz, alongside Nick Mitchell, was traded to the Cleveland Guardians in exchange for Andrés Giménez and Nick Sandlin. On the same day, Horwitz was then traded by the Guardians to the Pittsburgh Pirates in exchange for Luis Ortiz, Michael Kennedy, and Josh Hartle.

He missed spring training and the first 45 games of the 2025 season following a thumb surgery to relieve right wrist pain. On July 23, 2025, Horwitz hit his first career grand slam off of Troy Melton of the Detroit Tigers. In 2025 he batted .272/.353/.434 in 364 at bats with 26 doubles, 11 home runs, 55 runs, and 51 RBIs.

==== 2026 season ====
On June 25, 2026, Horwitz was placed on the 10-day injured list with a left hamstring strain. At the time he was batting .280/.386/.455 with 10 home runs in 246 at bats.

== International career ==
Horwitz played for the Israel national baseball team roster in the 2023 World Baseball Classic. He played left field for Team Israel manager and former All-Star Ian Kinsler, and alongside All-Star outfielder Joc Pederson and starting pitcher Dean Kremer, among others.

== See also ==
- List of Jewish Major League Baseball players
- List of Jews in Sports
