= Verdigris, Oklahoma =

- Town
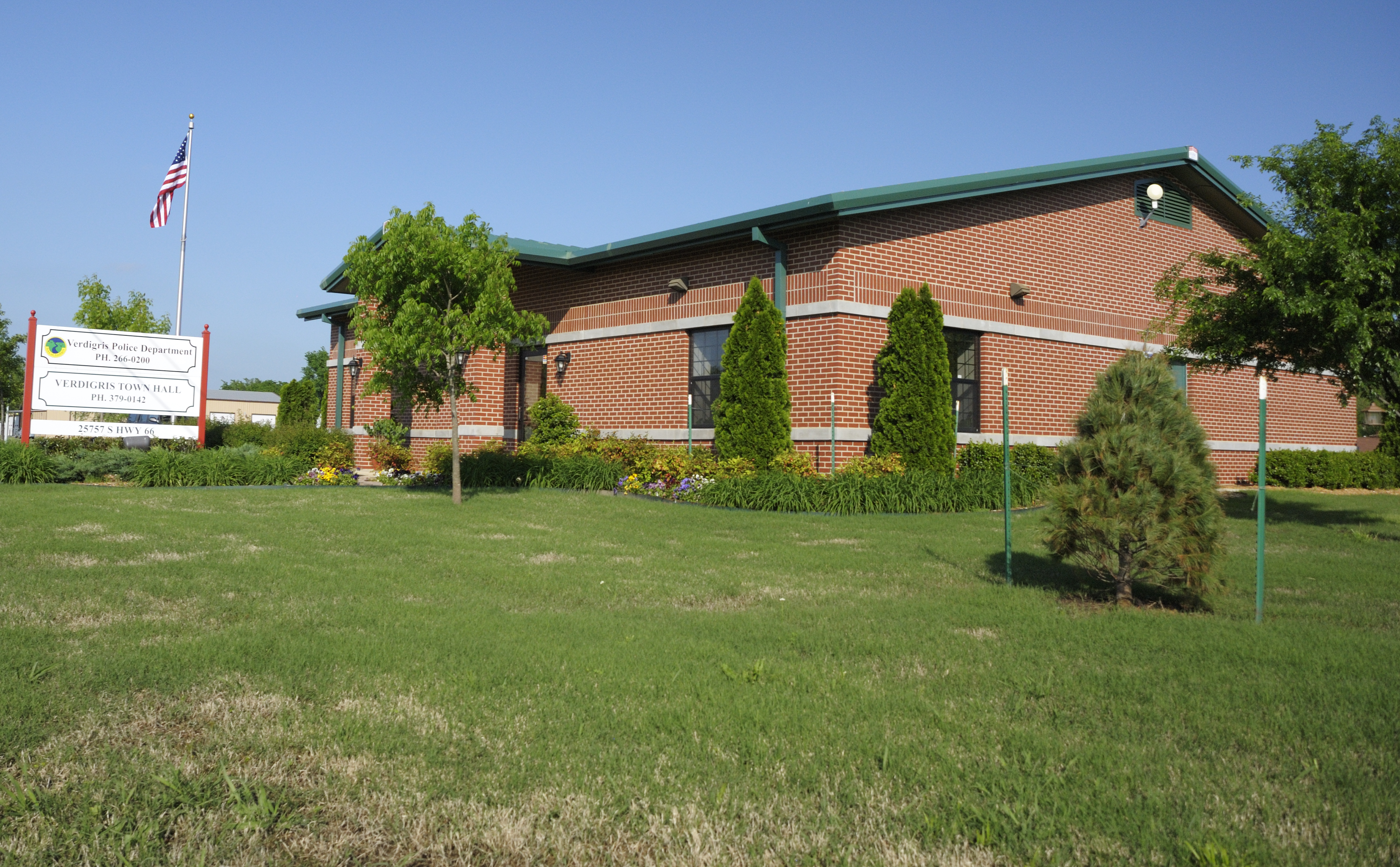
- Verdigris Town Hall
- Interactive map of Verdigris, Oklahoma
- Coordinates: 36°14′22″N 95°40′26″W
- Country: United States
- State: Oklahoma
- County: Rogers

Area
  - Total: 5.64 sq mi (14.62 km^{2})
  - Land: 5.64 sq mi (14.62 km^{2})
  - Water: 0 sq mi (0.00 km^{2})
- Elevation: 600 ft (180 m)

Population (2020)
  - Total: 5,256
  - Density: 930.8/sq mi (359.39/km^{2})
- Time zone: UTC-6 (CST)
  - Summer (DST): UTC-5 (CDT)
- ZIP codes: 74019
- Area codes: 539/918
- FIPS code: 40-14700
- GNIS feature ID: 2413429
- Website: www.townofverdigris.com

Verdigris is an incorporated town in Rogers County, Oklahoma, United States, in the Tulsa metropolitan area. It straddles former U.S. Highway 66 (now State Highway 66) between Catoosa and Claremore. As of the 2020 census, Verdigris had a population of 5,256.

== History ==
Verdigris is named after the nearby Verdigris River, so named by French traders who settled in the area around the late 1700s. Several Native American tribes, including the Osage, Delaware and Cherokee, had populations along the Verdigris River. The rural community known as Verdigris has been in existence since before Oklahoma statehood in 1907. The St. Louis-San Francisco Railway (Frisco) referred to the area as the "Verdigris Switch" in the late 1880s. Verdigris schools were founded in the early 1900s. America's Mother road, U.S. 66, was routed through Verdigris in the late 1920s.

Verdigris is the fastest growing municipality in Rogers County. The growth rate between 2000 and 2010 was 119%. The population at the 2010 census was 3,993.

== Climate ==
The average annual temperature is 60 degrees. On average, 66 days annually are above 90 degrees, and 25 days annually have a temperature of 20 degrees or lower. The average rainfall is 43.45 inches. The growing season is 208 days.

== Demographics ==
Historical population
Census	Pop.	Note	%±
2000	659		—
2010	3,993		505.9%
2020	5,256		31.6%
U.S. Decennial Census

=== 2020 census ===
As of the 2020 census, Verdigris had a population of 5,256. The median age was 34.2 years. 28.7% of residents were under the age of 18 and 13.1% of residents were 65 years of age or older. For every 100 females there were 100.5 males, and for every 100 females age 18 and over there were 99.3 males age 18 and over.

95.5% of residents lived in urban areas, while 4.5% lived in rural areas.

There were 1,818 households in Verdigris, of which 43.6% had children under the age of 18 living in them. Of all households, 63.5% were married-couple households, 13.4% were households with a male householder and no spouse or partner present, and 16.6% were households with a female householder and no spouse or partner present. About 14.9% of all households were made up of individuals and 6.8% had someone living alone who was 65 years of age or older.

There were 1,919 housing units, of which 5.3% were vacant. The homeowner vacancy rate was 2.0% and the rental vacancy rate was 7.8%.

Racial composition as of the 2020 census
Race	Number	Percent
White	3,484	66.3%
Black or African American	33	0.6%
American Indian and Alaska Native	673	12.8%
Asian	39	0.7%
Native Hawaiian and Other Pacific Islander	0	0.0%
Some other race	143	2.7%
Two or more races	884	16.8%
Hispanic or Latino (of any race)	395	7.5%

=== 2010 census ===
As of the 2010 census, there were 3,993 people living in the Town of Verdigris. There were 1,598 housing units. The racial makeup of Verdigris was 77.41% White, 13.30% Native American, 0.55% Asian, 0.43% Black, 6.74% from 2 or more races, and 1.57% other.

== Economy ==
Verdigris is primarily a small agricultural community. It is also the home of the CF Industries’ Verdigris Nitrogen Facility, which manufactures anhydrous ammonia, urea ammonium nitrate (UAN) solutions, nitric acid, high purity argon and food grade liquid carbon dioxide. The facility is located on 800 acres (320 ha) and employs approximately 200 people. The UAN production facility has an annual capacity of 2.0 million tons and is the second largest such in North America.

== Notable people ==
- Peyton Battenfield - Baseball player for the Cleveland Guardians
- Rotnei Clarke - Basketball player
- Steve Gage- Football player for the University of Tulsa then NFL for Washington Redskins
- Zach Loyd - Defender/Midfielder for FC Dallas
