= Xzavion Curry =

American baseball player (born 1998)

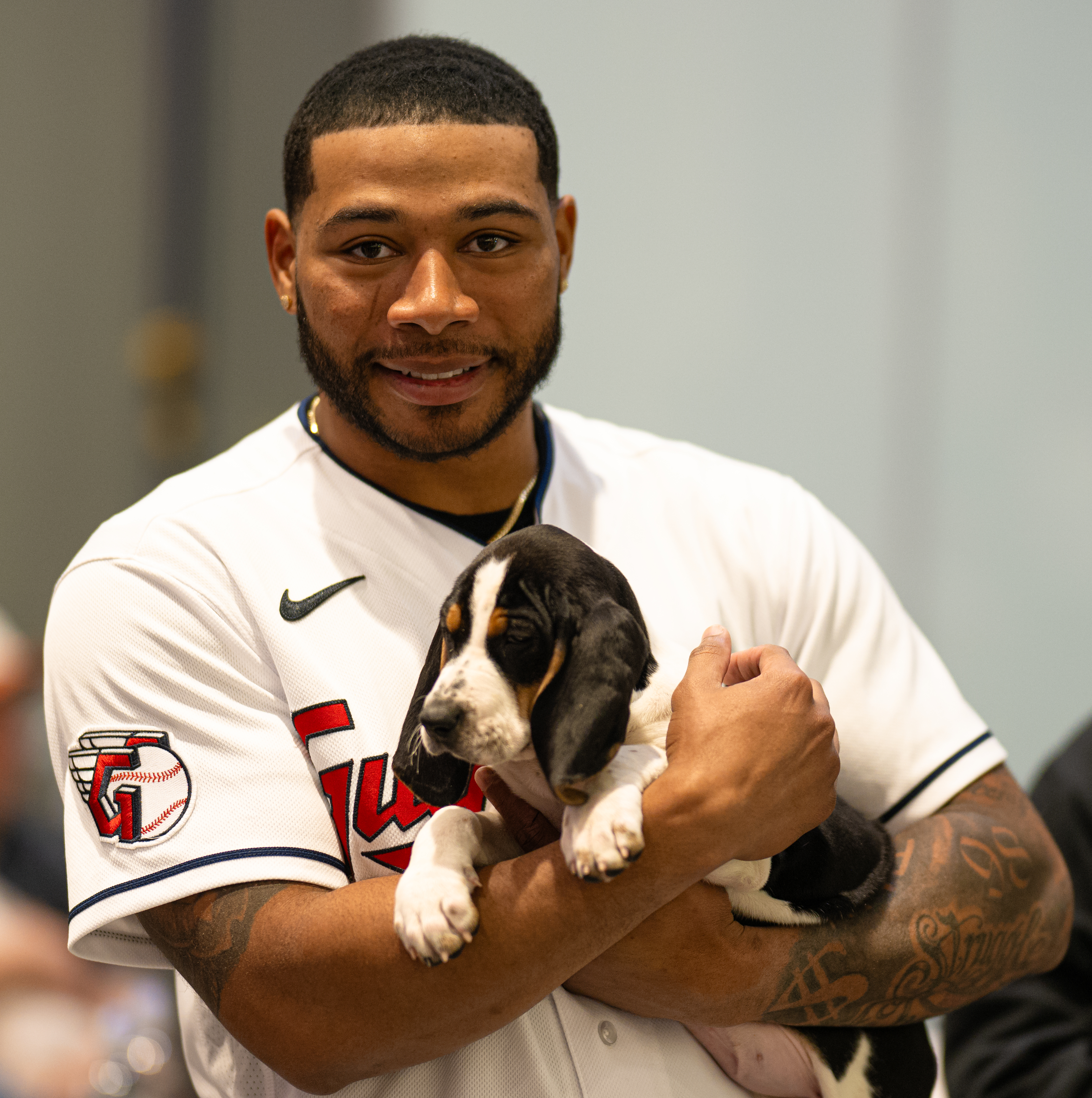
- Curry with the Cleveland Guardians in 2024

Free agent
- Pitcher
- Born: July 27, 1998 (age 28); Orangeburg, South Carolina, U.S.
- Bats: Right Throws: Right

MLB debut
- August 15, 2022, for the Cleveland Guardians

MLB statistics (through 2026 season)
- Win–loss record: 5–9
- Earned run average: 4.52
- Strikeouts: 114
- Stats at Baseball Reference

Teams
- Cleveland Guardians (2022–2024); Miami Marlins (2024–2025); New York Mets (2026)

Xzavion Rashan Curry (born July 27, 1998) is an American professional baseball pitcher who is a free agent. He has previously played in Major League Baseball (MLB) for the Cleveland Guardians, Miami Marlins, and New York Mets.

== Amateur career ==
Curry was born in Orangeburg, South Carolina. He attended Benjamin Elijah Mays High School in Atlanta, Georgia and Georgia Tech, where he played college baseball for the Georgia Tech Yellow Jackets.

During the summer of 2017, Curry played for the Brookhaven Bucks in the Sunbelt Baseball League, where he was named an all-star. During the summer of 2018, he played collegiate summer baseball with the Harwich Mariners of the Cape Cod Baseball League. In 2019, his junior year at Georgia Tech, Curry pitched 57 1/3 innings and went 4–2 with a 4.08 earned run average (ERA) and 66 strikeouts.

== Professional career ==
=== Cleveland Indians / Guardians ===
After his junior year, the Cleveland Indians selected Curry in the seventh round of the 2019 Major League Baseball draft. He signed with the Indians, but did not play after signing and also did not play in 2020 after the minor league season was cancelled due to the COVID-19 pandemic. He made his professional debut in 2021 with the Lynchburg Hillcats of the Low-A East and was promoted to the Lake County Captains of the High-A Central and the Akron RubberDucks of the Double-A Northeast during the season. Over 19 starts between the three clubs, Curry went 8–1 with a 2.30 ERA and 123 strikeouts over 97 2/3 innings. His ERA was sixth lowest in the minor leagues. He returned to Akron to begin the 2022 season and was promoted to the Columbus Clippers of the Triple-A International League in late June.

On August 14, 2022, Guardians manager Terry Francona announced that Curry would be promoted to the major leagues the next day to make his MLB debut as the starting pitcher in the second game of a double header versus the Detroit Tigers at Progressive Field. He debuted wearing number 71, which hadn't been worn by a Guardians player since Johnny Hodapp in 1929, the first year players wore jersey numbers. He pitched five innings and gave up eight hits, three earned runs, and one walk while striking out three in a 7–5 loss.

Curry was initially optioned to Triple-A Columbus to begin the 2023 season. However, after Triston McKenzie suffered an injury, Hunter Gaddis was moved into the rotation, and Curry took his spot in the Opening Day bullpen. On April 3, he made his first appearance of the year, pitching five innings in relief, allowing two runs to the Oakland Athletics after Zach Plesac could not record an out in the second inning.

Curry made 7 appearances (4 starts) for Cleveland in 2024, posting a 5.84 ERA with 15 strikeouts across 24 2/3 innings pitched. On August 6, 2024, Curry was designated for assignment by the Guardians.

=== Miami Marlins ===
On August 9, 2024, Curry was claimed off waivers by the Miami Marlins. In 9 games for Miami, he posted a 2–0 record and 3.00 ERA with 13 strikeouts over 18 innings of work.

Curry was designated for assignment by the Marlins on February 11, 2025. He cleared waivers and was sent outright to the Triple-A Jacksonville Jumbo Shrimp on February 14. On March 30, the Marlins selected Curry's contract, adding him to their active roster. In three appearances for Miami, he posted an 0–1 record and 6.00 ERA with one strikeout over three innings of work. Curry was designated for assignment by the Marlins on April 11. He again cleared waivers and was sent outright to Jacksonville on April 14. Curry was released by the Marlins organization on June 3.

=== Tigres de Quintana Roo ===
On July 1, 2025, Curry signed with the Tigres de Quintana Roo of the Mexican League. In seven appearances (six starts) for Quintana Roo, Curry compiled a 3–2 record and 3.44 ERA with 14 strikeouts over 34 innings of work.

=== Colorado Rockies ===
On August 10, 2025, Curry signed a minor league contract with the Colorado Rockies organization. He made eight starts for the Triple-A Albuquerque Isotopes, but struggled to a 2–3 record and 7.97 ERA with 19 strikeouts over 35 innings of work. Curry elected free agency following the season on November 6.

=== Tigres de Quintana Roo (second stint) ===
On April 11, 2026, Curry signed with the Tigres de Quintana Roo of the Mexican League. Curry made four starts for Quintana Roo, compiling a 1-2 record and 4.87 ERA with 17 strikeouts across 20 1/3 innings pitched.

=== New York Mets ===
On May 9, 2026, Curry signed a minor league contract with the New York Mets and was assigned to the Triple–A Syracuse Mets. On July 8, New York selected Curry's contract, adding him to their active roster. He was designated for assignment on September 23. On September 25, he cleared waivers and was sent outright to the FCL Mets. He elected free agency on November 2.
