= Logan Allen (baseball, born 1998) =

American baseball player (born 1998)

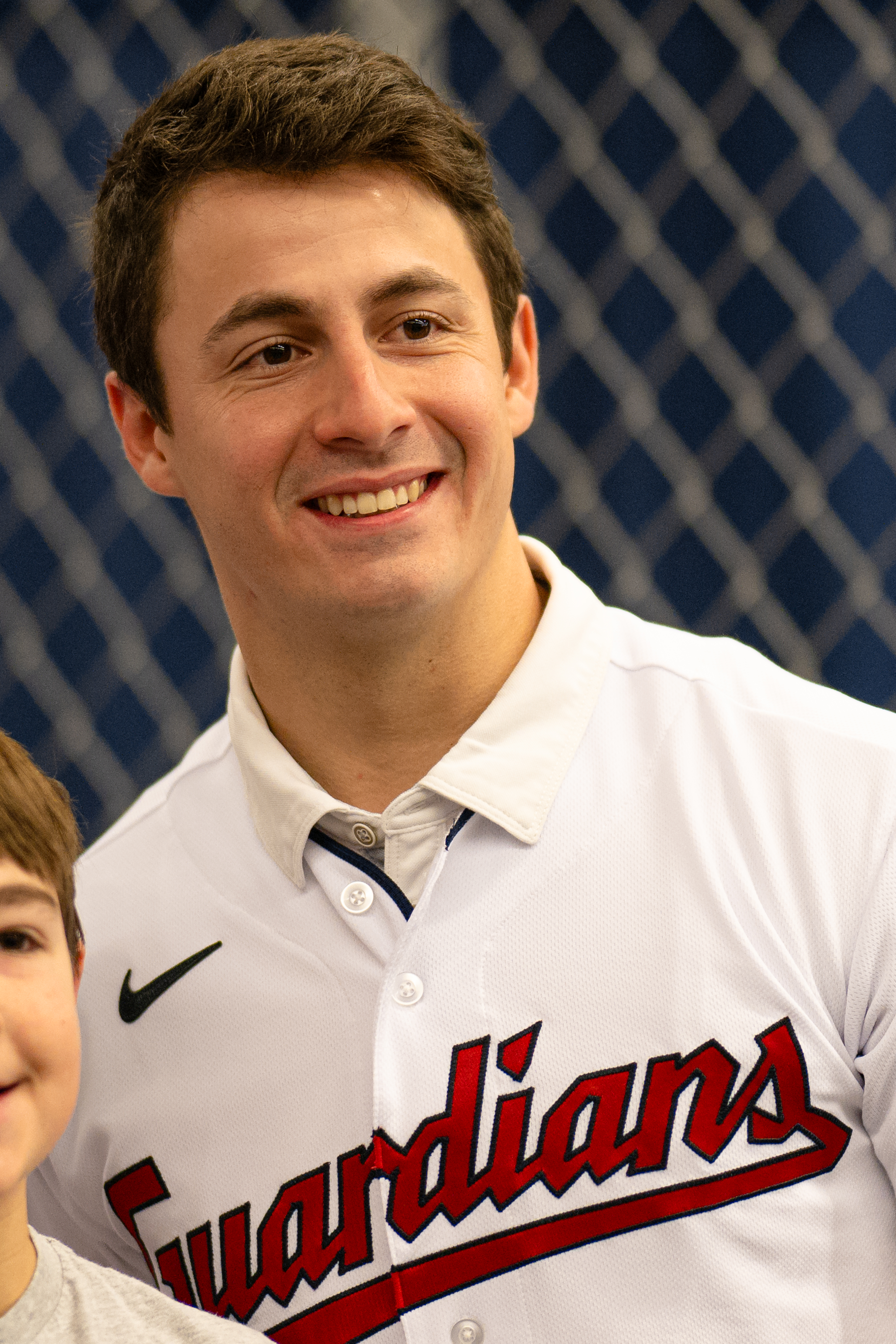
- Allen with the Cleveland Guardians in 2024

Cleveland Guardians – No. 26
- Pitcher
- Born: September 5, 1998 (age 28); Altamonte Springs, Florida, U.S.
- Bats: Right Throws: Left

MLB debut
- April 23, 2023, for the Cleveland Guardians

MLB statistics (through 2026 season)
- Win–loss record: 23–24
- Earned run average: 4.55
- Strikeouts: 336
- Stats at Baseball Reference

Teams
- Cleveland Guardians (2023–present)

Logan Taylor Allen (born September 5, 1998) is an American professional baseball pitcher for the Cleveland Guardians of Major League Baseball (MLB). He made his MLB debut in 2023.

== Amateur career ==
Allen grew up in Deltona, Florida and attended University High School in Orange City, Florida. He was named The Daytona Beach News-Journal's Player of the Year for three straight seasons and was named the Florida Gatorade Baseball Player of the Year and Florida Mr. Baseball as a senior. In his final high school start, Allen threw a no-hitter to send University to the state championship game. Allen was selected in the 16th round of the 2017 Major League Baseball draft by the Baltimore Orioles, but opted not to sign.

Allen attended Florida International University (FIU) and played college baseball for the FIU Panthers as both a pitcher and a first baseman. In 2018, he was named a Freshman All-American by the NCBWA, Collegiate Baseball Newspaper, and Perfect Game and second team All-Conference USA as a utility player after posting a 5–5 record with a 3.89 earned run average and 85 strikeouts in 74 innings pitched while also batting .309 with two home runs and 16 runs batted in. As a sophomore, Allen was named first team All-Conference USA after went 4–6 with a 3.11 earned run average with 120 strikeouts in 84 innings pitched and hit .276 with three home runs. After the 2019 season, he played collegiate summer baseball with the Harwich Mariners of the Cape Cod Baseball League. As a junior in 2020, Allen went 2–1 with a 2.45 earned run average in four starts batted .286 with one home run and two runs batted in before the season was cut short due to the coronavirus pandemic.

== Professional career ==
The Cleveland Indians selected Allen in the second round of the 2020 Major League Baseball draft. Allen was assigned to the High-A Lake County Captains at the beginning of the 2021 season, where he went 5–0 with a 1.58 earned run average in nine starts before being promoted to the Double-A Akron RubberDucks. He had a 2.85 ERA with 76 strikeouts in 60 innings pitched after his promotion. Allen returned to Akron at the beginning of the 2022 season before being promoted to the Triple-A Columbus Clippers after going 5–3 with a 3.33 ERA and 104 strikeouts in 73 innings over 13 starts.

On April 23, 2023, Allen was selected to the Guardians' 40-man roster and promoted to the major leagues for the first time. He made his major league debut the same day. Allen struck out eight, walked one, and gave up one run, picking up the win in his first career MLB start. Allen was optioned back to the Clippers on June 29, as the corresponding move for the recall of reliever Michael Kelly. He made 24 starts for Cleveland during his rookie campaign, compiling a 7-8 record and 3.81 ERA with 119 strikeouts across 125 1/3 innings pitched.

Allen started 20 contests for the Guardians during the 2024 season, registering an 8-5 record and 5.73 ERA with 79 strikeouts across 97 1/3 innings pitched. He made 30 appearances (including 29 starts) for Cleveland in 2025, posting an 8-11 record and 4.25 ERA with 122 strikeouts over 156 2/3 innings of work.

Allen was optioned to Triple-A Columbus to begin the 2026 season.

== International career ==
Allen played for the Panama national baseball team during the 2026 World Baseball Classic, giving up three runs in three innings in a loss against Cuba.

== Personal life ==
Allen is the son of Douglas Allen and Caron Pamela Sadowski. His brother, Hunter, played baseball at Alabama State University and was an assistant softball coach at Florida International University. Logan is dating Bridget Howard, daughter of ex-MLB player David Howard. Allen is of Panamanian descent through his mother.
