= Andrés Giménez =

Venezuelan baseball player (born 1998)

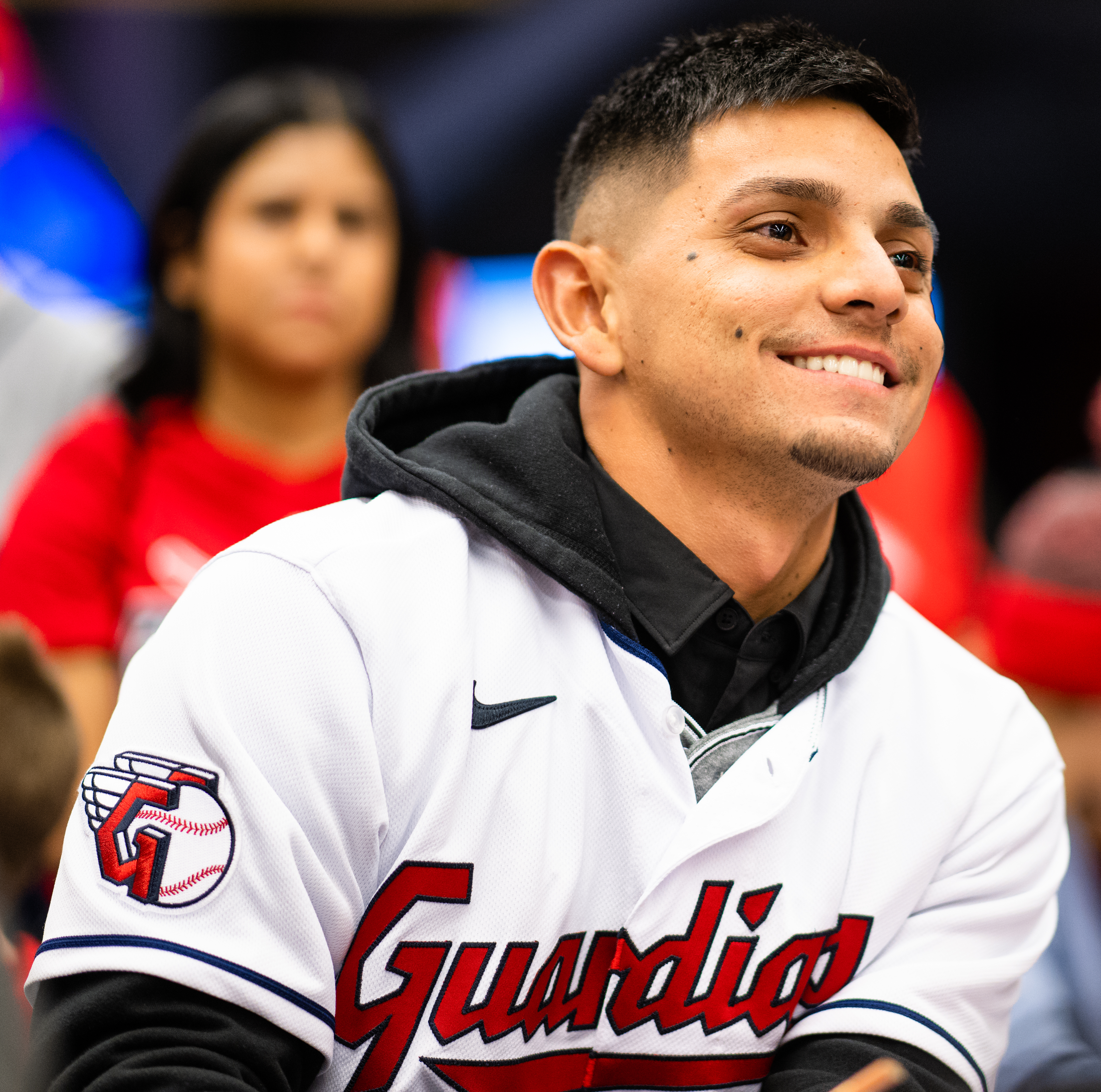
- Giménez with the Cleveland Guardians in 2023

Toronto Blue Jays – No. 0
- Second baseman / Shortstop
- Born: September 4, 1998 (age 28); Barquisimeto, Venezuela
- Bats: Left Throws: Right

MLB debut
- July 24, 2020, for the New York Mets

MLB statistics (through 2026 season)
- Batting average: .252
- Home runs: 65
- Runs batted in: 316
- Stolen bases: 131
- Stats at Baseball Reference

Teams
- New York Mets (2020); Cleveland Indians / Guardians (2021–2024); Toronto Blue Jays (2025–present)

Career highlights and awards
- All-Star (2022); 3× Gold Glove Award (2022–2024)
Medals
Men's baseball
Representing Venezuela
World Baseball Classic
Gold medal – first place	2026 Miami	Team

Andrés Alfonso Giménez Osorio (born September 4, 1998) is a Venezuelan professional baseball second baseman and shortstop for the Toronto Blue Jays of Major League Baseball (MLB). He has previously played in MLB for the New York Mets and Cleveland Guardians. He made his MLB debut in 2020 with the Mets.

== Career ==
=== New York Mets ===
Giménez signed with the New York Mets of Major League Baseball (MLB) as an international free agent in July 2015. He made his professional debut in 2016 with the Dominican Summer League Mets and spent the whole season there, batting a combined .350 with three home runs, 38 runs batted in (RBIs), and a .992 on-base plus slugging (OPS). In 2017, he played for the Columbia Fireflies where he slashed .265/.346/.349 with four home runs and 31 RBIs in 92 games.

After the 2017 season, Baseball America rated Giménez as the Mets' best prospect. He spent the 2018 season with both the St. Lucie Mets and the Binghamton Rumble Ponies, batting .281/.347/.409 with six home runs, 46 RBIs, and 38 stolen bases in 122 total games between the two clubs. That summer, he played in the 2018 All-Star Futures Game. He returned to Binghamton for the 2019 season, hitting .250/.309/.387 with nine home runs, 37 RBIs, and 28 stolen bases over 117 games.

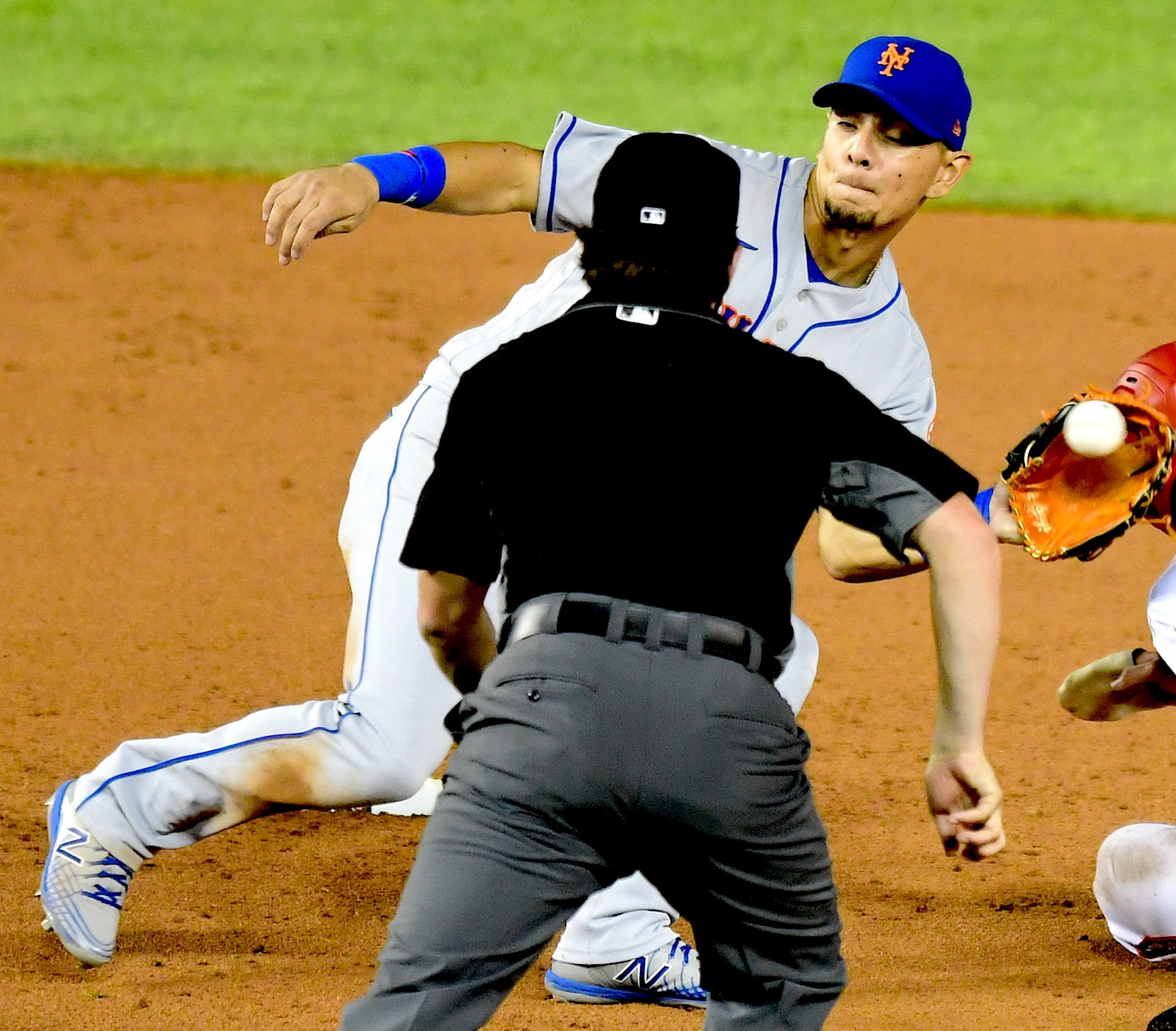
Giménez with the Mets in 2020

The Mets added Giménez to their 40-man roster following the 2019 season. Giménez made the Mets' Opening Day roster in 2020, and made his Major League debut on July 24, 2020, at Citi Field as an eighth inning defensive replacement for Robinson Canó at second base. On July 29, Giménez made his first start, and recorded his first career hit off of Boston Red Sox pitcher Nathan Eovaldi, a single, in the second inning. In the sixth inning of the same game, Giménez tripled off Marcus Walden to record his first career RBI.

Giménez received a single vote in National League Rookie of the Year voting, tying him for seventh place with Ian Anderson and Sixto Sánchez. According to Statcast, his sprint speed was tied for fourth-fastest among Major League shortstops on the season.

=== Cleveland Indians / Guardians ===
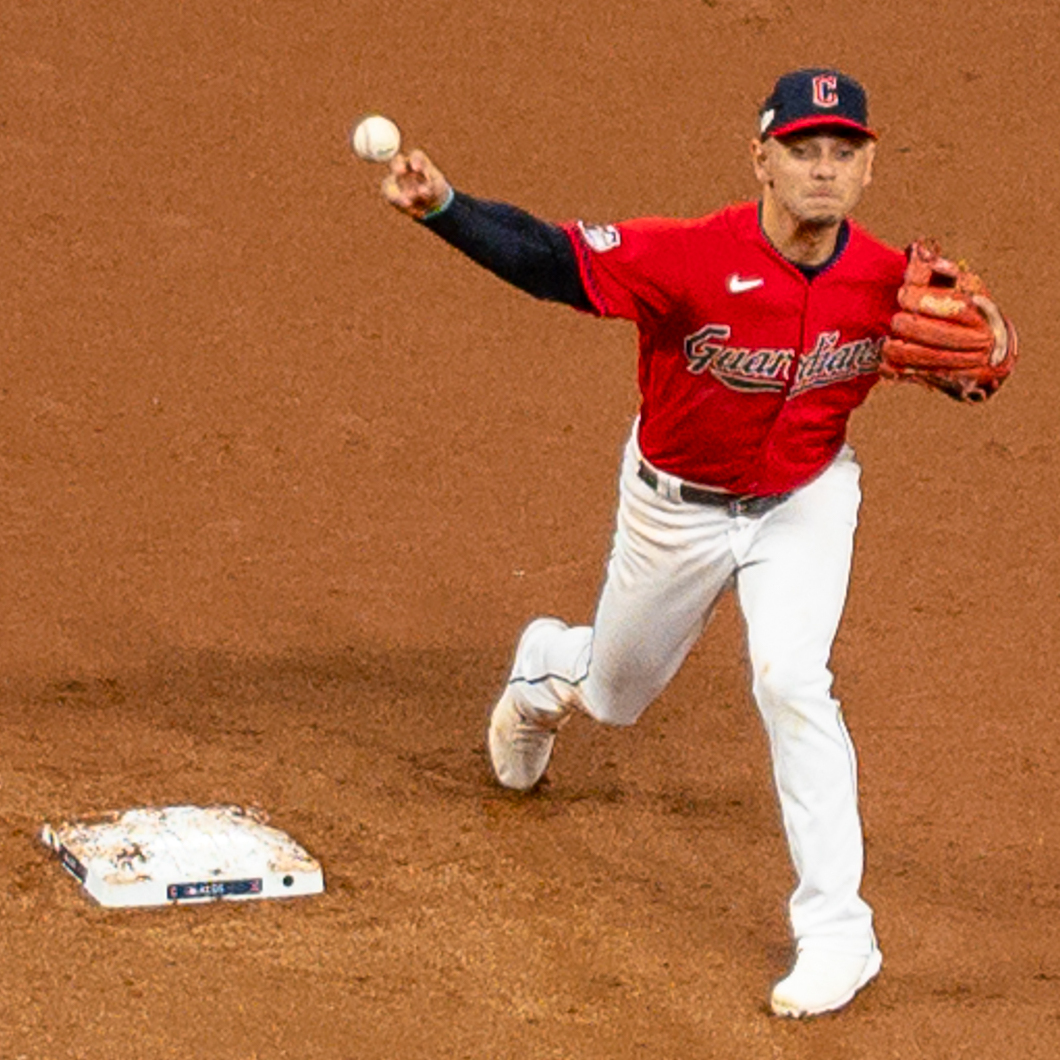
Giménez with the Guardians in 2022

On January 7, 2021, the Mets traded Giménez, Amed Rosario, Josh Wolf, and Isaiah Greene to the Cleveland Indians for Francisco Lindor and Carlos Carrasco. Giménez was the Indians' Opening Day starter at shortstop. Giménez struggled at the start of the season and was demoted to Triple-A on May 18.

In 2022 with the renamed Guardians, Giménez experienced a breakout season, batting .297 with 17 home runs and 69 RBI. He was elected to the All Star Game at 2nd base, and started as a replacement for the injured Jose Altuve. His reputation as a clutch hitter developed in 2022, as he had a 281 WRC+ in high leverage situations, meaning he nearly tripled the average hitter's production in that position. Giménez won a Gold Glove Award for his performance at second base. He was also selected for the second team on the 2022 All-MLB Team.

Prior to the 2023 season, Giménez represented the Venezuelan national baseball team in the 2023 World Baseball Classic. On March 30, Giménez signed a seven-year major league contract with the Guardians worth $106.5 million. The deal includes a club option for the 2030 season. On April 12, 2023, a relay throw to home plate by Giménez struck the head of umpire Larry Vanover, who was hospitalized with non-life threatening injuries. In 2023 he batted .251/.314/.399, had the lowest average exit velocity of all AL batters (84.8 mph), and led the AL in percentage of balls that were softly hit (21.7%).

=== Toronto Blue Jays ===
On December 10, 2024, Giménez, alongside Nick Sandlin, was traded to the Toronto Blue Jays in exchange for Spencer Horwitz and Nick Mitchell. In his first five games with the Toronto Blue Jays to start the season, Giménez hit three home runs, a franchise record.

== See also ==
- List of Gold Glove Award winners at second base
