= Nick Sandlin =

American baseball player (born 1997)

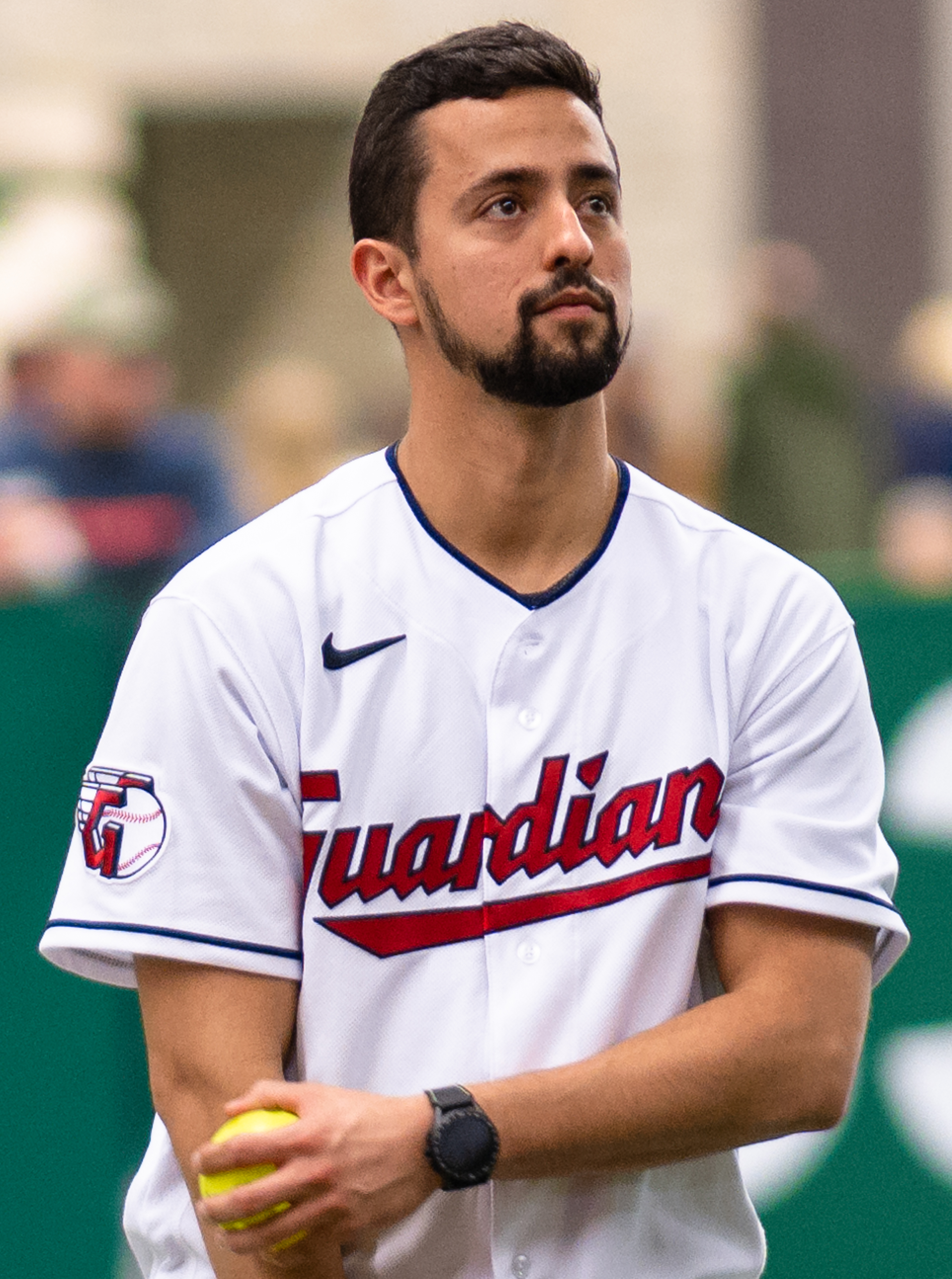
- Sandlin with the Cleveland Guardians in 2023

Free agent
- Pitcher
- Born: January 10, 1997 (age 29); Evans, Georgia, U.S.
- Bats: Right Throws: Right

MLB debut
- May 1, 2021, for the Cleveland Indians

MLB statistics (through 2026 season)
- Win–loss record: 19–11
- Earned run average: 3.51
- Strikeouts: 245
- Stats at Baseball Reference

Teams
- Cleveland Indians / Guardians (2021–2024); Toronto Blue Jays (2025); Los Angeles Angels (2026)

Nick Howard Sandlin (born January 10, 1997) is an American professional baseball pitcher who is a free agent. He has previously played in Major League Baseball (MLB) for the Cleveland Indians / Guardians, Toronto Blue Jays, and Los Angeles Angels.

== Amateur career ==
Sandlin - a sidearm style pitcher - attended Greenbrier High School in Evans, Georgia. He enrolled at the University of Southern Mississippi and played college baseball for the Southern Miss Golden Eagles. In 2017, he played collegiate summer baseball with the Hyannis Harbor Hawks of the Cape Cod Baseball League. In 2018, his junior year, Sandlin won the C Spire Ferriss Trophy, given to the best collegiate baseball player in Mississippi. and was named Conference USA's Baseball Pitcher of the Year and the National Pitcher of the Year Award from Perfect Game/Rawlings.

== Professional career ==
=== Cleveland Indians / Guardians ===
The Cleveland Indians selected Sandlin in the second round, with the 67th overall selection, of the 2018 MLB draft. He signed with Cleveland, receiving a $750,000 signing bonus. He spent the 2018 season with the rookie-level Arizona League Indians, Single-A Lake County Captains, High-A Lynchburg Hillcats, and Double-A Akron RubberDucks, compiling a combined 2–0 record and 3.00 ERA with 36 strikeouts in 24 total relief innings pitched between the four clubs.

In 2019, Sandlin played for Akron and the Triple-A Columbus Clippers. He went a combined 1–0 with a 2.39 ERA over 26 1/3 innings. On July 1, it was announced that he would miss the rest of the season due to a right forearm strain. Sandlin did not play in a game in 2020 due to the cancellation of the Minor League Baseball season because of the COVID-19 pandemic.

On April 30, 2021, Sandlin was promoted to the major leagues for the first time. On May 1, Sandlin made his MLB debut against the Chicago White Sox and struck out White Sox outfielder Adam Eaton for his first major league strikeout. He made 34 relief outings during his rookie campaign, posting a 2.94 ERA with 48 strikeouts across 33 2/3 innings pitched.

Sandlin pitched in 46 games out of the bullpen during the 2022 season, compiling a 5-2 record and 2.25 ERA with 41 strikeouts over 44 innings of work. In 2023, he made 61 appearances, logging a 5-5 record and 3.75 ERA with 66 strikeouts over 60 innings of work. Sandlin made 68 appearances for Cleveland in 2024, registering an 8-0 record and 3.75 ERA with 68 strikeouts and 1 save across 57 2/3 innings pitched.

=== Toronto Blue Jays ===
On December 10, 2024, Sandlin, alongside Andrés Giménez, was traded to the Toronto Blue Jays in exchange for Spencer Horwitz and Nick Mitchell. He made 19 appearances for Toronto, logging an 0-2 record and 2.20 ERA with 16 strikeouts and one save across 16 1/3 innings pitched. On July 8, 2025, Sandlin was placed on the injured list due to right elbow inflammation. He was transferred to the 60-day injured list on September 1. Sandlin was removed from the 40-man roster and sent outright to the Triple-A Buffalo Bisons on November 15; he elected to become a free agent two days later.

=== Los Angeles Angels ===
On January 26, 2026, Sandlin signed a minor league contract with the Los Angeles Angels. He was assigned to the Triple-A Salt Lake Bees to begin the season, where he recorded a 1.42 ERA across five appearances. On April 12, the Angels selected Sandlin's contract, adding him to their active roster. He made eight appearances for Los Angeles, but struggled to an 0-1 record and 11.42 ERA with six strikeouts over 8 2/3 innings pitched. On May 4, Sandlin was designated for assignment by the Angels. He elected free agency after clearing waivers on May 6.

=== Detroit Tigers ===
On May 10, 2026, Sandlin signed a minor league contract with the Detroit Tigers. He made 26 appearances (including one start) for the Triple–A Toledo Mud Hens, compiling a 2–0 record and 3.50 ERA with 46 strikeouts and two saves over 36 innings of work. Sandlin was released by the Tigers organization on August 25. On August 28, Sandlin re-signed with the Tigers on a new minor league contract. He elected free agency on November 2.

== Personal life ==
His older brother, Jake, also played baseball for Greenbrier and Southern Miss.
