= Peyton Battenfield =

American baseball player (born 1997)

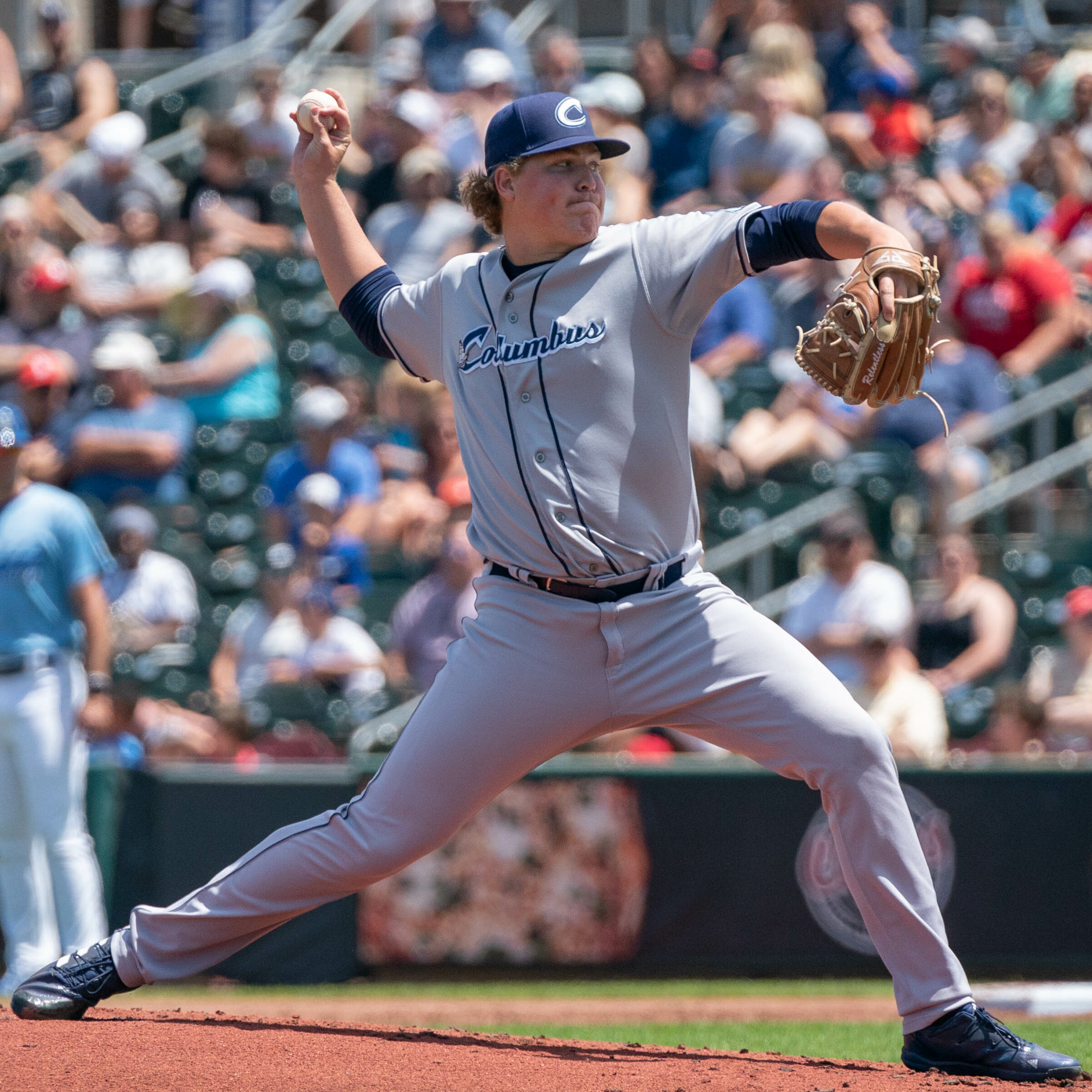
- Battenfield with the Columbus Clippers in 2022
- Pitcher
- Born: August 10, 1997 (age 28); Tulsa, Oklahoma, U.S.
- Batted: Right Threw: Right

MLB debut
- April 12, 2023, for the Cleveland Guardians

Last MLB appearance
- May 17, 2023, for the Cleveland Guardians

MLB statistics
- Win–loss record: 0–5
- Earned run average: 5.19
- Strikeouts: 27
- Stats at Baseball Reference

Teams
- Cleveland Guardians (2023)

Peyton Cole Battenfield (born August 10, 1997) is an American former professional baseball pitcher. He played in Major League Baseball (MLB) for the Cleveland Guardians.

== Amateur career ==
Battenfield attended Verdigris High School in Verdigris, Oklahoma. As a senior he was The Oklahoman All-State Baseball Player of the Year. After high school, he attended Oklahoma State University and played college baseball for the Oklahoma State Cowboys.

== Professional career ==
=== Houton Astros ===
The Houston Astros selected Battenfield in the ninth round of the 2019 Major League Baseball draft. He made his professional debut that season with the Tri-City ValleyCats, going 2–1 with a 1.60 earned run average over 14 starts.

=== Tampa Bay Rays ===
On January 9, 2020, the Astros traded Battenfield and Cal Stevenson to the Tampa Bay Rays for Austin Pruitt. He did not play a minor league game in 2020 since the season was cancelled due to the COVID-19 pandemic. Battenfield began the 2021 with the High-A Bowling Green Hot Rods before being promoted to the Double-A Montgomery Biscuits.

=== Cleveland Indians / Guardians ===
On July 30, 2021, the Rays traded Battenfield to the Cleveland Indians in exchange for Jordan Luplow and D. J. Johnson. After the trade, he was assigned to the Double-A Akron RubberDucks. Over 21 games (19 starts) between the three teams, he went 7–1 with a 2.53 earned run average and 131 strikeouts over 103 innings.

Battenfield began the 2022 season with the Triple-A Columbus Clippers. The Guardians selected Battenfield's contract as a COVID-19 replacement player on August 12, 2022. He was returned to Columbus on August 15 without making appearance, becoming a phantom ballplayer. On the year, he started 28 games for Columbus, posting an 8-6 record and 3.63 ERA with 109 strikeouts in 153.2 innings pitched.

On April 10, 2023, the Guardians selected Battenfield's contract a second time. He made his MLB debut as the Guardians' starting pitcher on April 12. Battenfield pitched 4 2/3 innings, allowing no walks, striking out three, and allowing a single earned run. He would go winless in his next four decisions, posting an 0–5 record and 5.19 ERA in 7 appearances (6 starts). On May 19, Battenfield was placed on the injured list with right shoulder inflammation. He was transferred to the 60-day injured list on June 3. On August 3, Battenfield was activated from the injured list and optioned to Triple–A Columbus. The Guardians designated Battenfield for assignment on August 31.

=== New York Mets ===
On September 2, 2023, Battenfield was claimed off waivers by the New York Mets, and was assigned to the Triple–A Syracuse Mets. In 2 starts for the Mets, he allowed 6 runs on 10 hits with 4 strikeouts across 9.0 innings of work. Following the season on November 2, Battenfield was removed from the 40–man roster and sent outright to Triple–A Syracuse. He elected free agency following the season on November 6.

On February 28, 2024, Battenfield re-signed with the Mets on a minor league contract. He was released by the organization on March 24.

=== Colorado Rockies ===
On April 17, 2024, Battenfield signed a minor league contract with the Colorado Rockies. In 26 appearances (24 starts) for the Triple-A Albuquerque Isotopes, he struggled to a 5-8 record and 7.45 ERA with 80 strikeouts across 118 1/3 innings pitched. Battenfield elected free agency following the season on November 4.

On March 1, 2025, Battenfield retired from professional baseball.
