= Austin Pruitt =

American baseball player (born 1989)

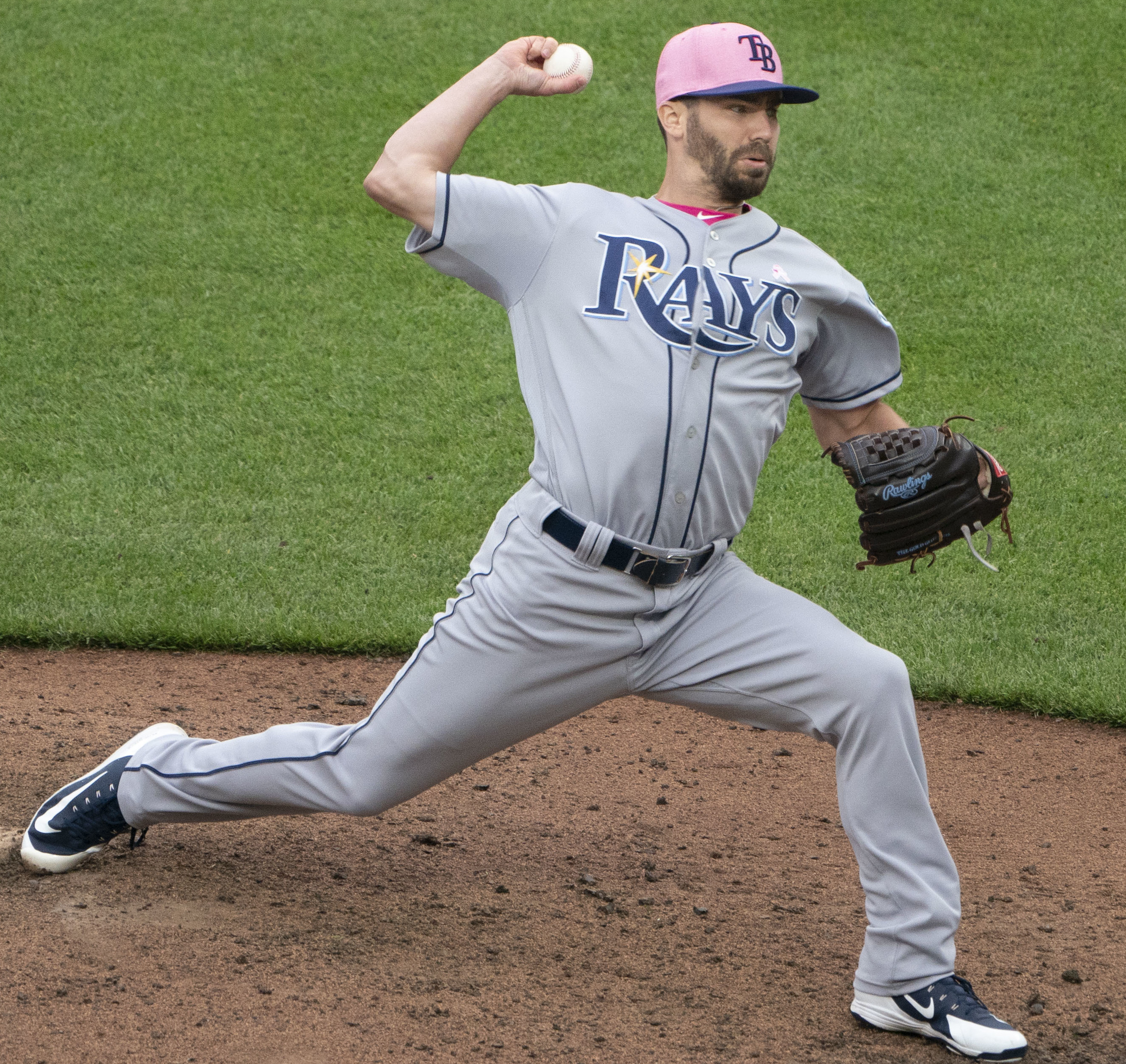
- Pruitt with the Tampa Bay Rays in 2018
- Pitcher
- Born: August 31, 1989 (age 37); Plano, Texas, U.S.
- Batted: Right Threw: Right

MLB debut
- April 2, 2017, for the Tampa Bay Rays

Last MLB appearance
- April 20, 2024, for the Texas Rangers

MLB statistics
- Win–loss record: 14–16
- Earned run average: 4.54
- Strikeouts: 221
- Stats at Baseball Reference

Teams
- Tampa Bay Rays (2017–2019); Houston Astros (2021); Miami Marlins (2021); Oakland Athletics (2022–2023); Texas Rangers (2024)

Austin Daniel Pruitt (born August 31, 1989) is an American former professional baseball pitcher. He played in Major League Baseball (MLB) for the Tampa Bay Rays, Houston Astros, Miami Marlins, Oakland Athletics, and Texas Rangers.

== Career ==
=== Amateur career ===
Pruitt attended The Woodlands College Park High School in The Woodlands, Texas, where he was a four-year baseball letterer and two-year football letterer, starting at defensive back on the football team. He played college baseball at Navarro College and was a key player as the team won the NJCAA title. He transferred to the University of Houston to continue his college baseball career with the Houston Cougars.

=== Tampa Bay Rays ===
The Tampa Bay Rays selected Pruitt in the ninth round of the 2013 Major League Baseball draft. After signing, he made his professional debut with the Hudson Valley Renegades and was promoted to the Bowling Green Hot Rods in July. In 14 games (seven starts), he was 0–3 with a 1.44 ERA. In 2014, he pitched for the Charlotte Stone Crabs where he pitched to a 9–7 record with a 3.73 ERA in 26 games (25 starts), and in 2015, he played with the Montgomery Biscuits where he was 10–7 with a 3.09 ERA in 26 starts. He spent 2016 with the Durham Bulls where he compiled an 8–11 record with a 3.76 ERA in 28 starts. The Rays added Pruitt to their 40-man roster after the 2016 season.

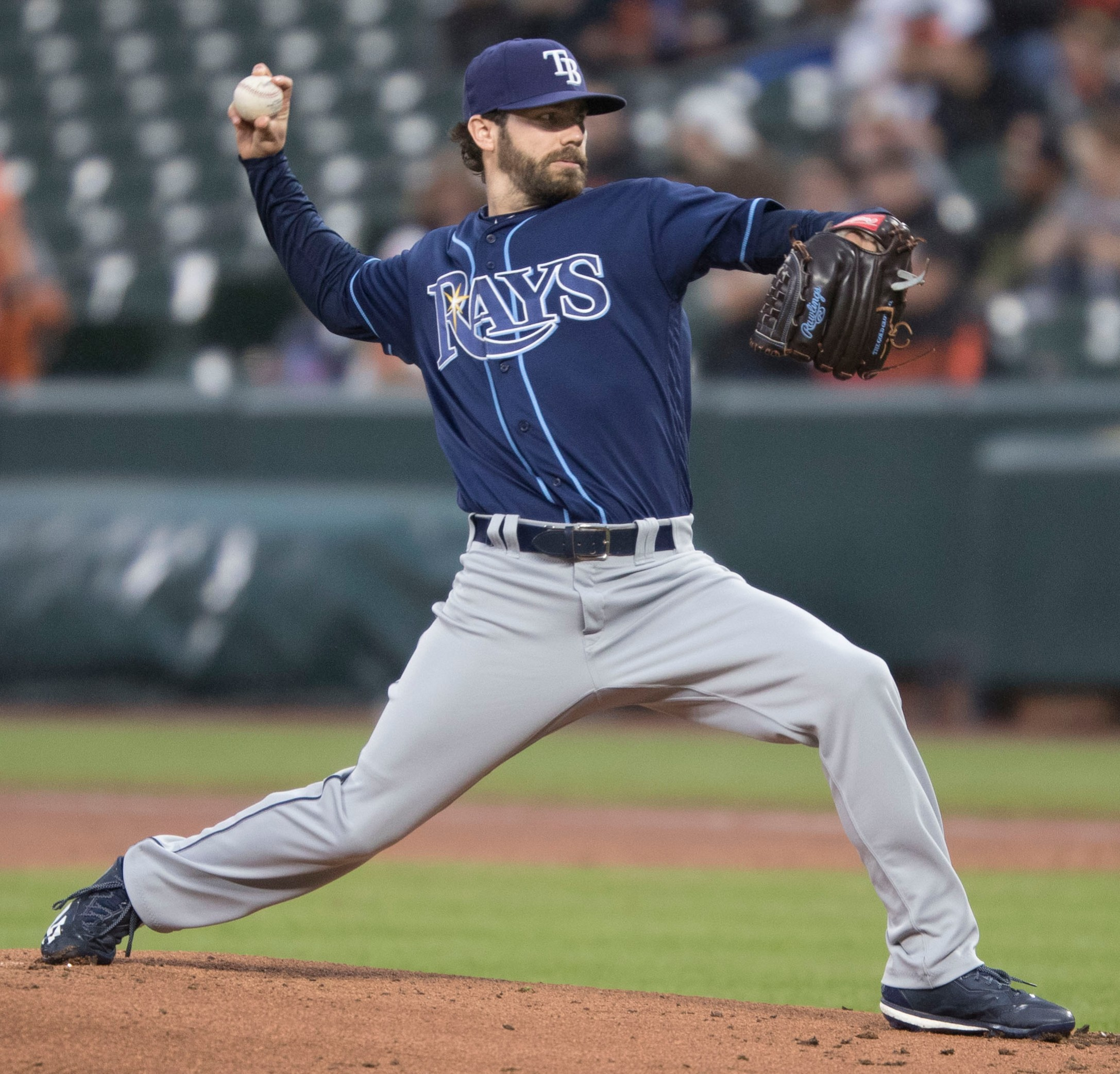
Pruitt with the Tampa Bay Rays in 2017

On March 30, 2017, the Tampa Bay Rays announced that Pruitt had made the 2017 Opening Day roster as a reliever. He made his major league debut on April 2, 2017. He loaded the bases and was charged with an unearned run without recording an out. Pruitt allowed ten earned runs in his first six innings of big league work. On 9 May, Pruitt was optioned to Durham after surrendering three runs the previous night. He was recalled on 31 May to replace Chih-Wei Hu. On July 28, Pruitt entered the Rays' rotation following an injury to starter Jake Odorizzi. In just his third career start, Pruitt hurled 6 1/3 scoreless innings against his hometown team — the Houston Astros. Pruitt ended the season with Tampa Bay with an ERA of 5.31 in 83 1/3 innings pitched, including eight starts. In 2018, Pruitt spent the majority of the season as the Rays' long reliever, logging 69 2/3 innings in 23 games. Pruitt appeared in 14 games for the Rays in 2019, recording a 4.40 ERA with 39 strikeouts in 47 innings.

=== Houston Astros ===
On January 9, 2020, the Rays traded Pruitt to the Houston Astros in exchange for Cal Stevenson and Peyton Battenfield. Pruitt did not appear in a game for the Astros in 2020 after suffering a hairline fracture in his right elbow. On April 10, 2021, Pruitt was placed on the 60-day injured list as he recovered from right elbow surgery. On July 16, Pruitt was activated off of the injured list. On July 28, Pruitt was designated for assignment by the Astros.

=== Miami Marlins ===
On July 28, 2021, the Astros traded Pruitt along with minor league outfielder Bryan De La Cruz for relief pitcher Yimi García. On August 5, the Marlins designated Pruitt for assignment. On August 7, Pruitt cleared waivers and was assigned outright to the Triple-A Jacksonville Jumbo Shrimp. On August 20, Pruitt's contract was selected by the Marlins. In 4 appearances for the Marlins, Pruitt posted a 1.93 ERA with 4 strikeouts. On September 2, Pruitt was designated for assignment by the Marlins, and was again outrighted to Jacksonville on September 5. On October 5, Pruitt elected free agency.

=== Oakland Athletics ===
On March 13, 2022, Pruitt signed a minor league contract with the Oakland Athletics organization. He had his contract selected to the major league roster on May 28. He was designated for assignment on August 22, and was sent outright to the Triple-A Las Vegas Aviators. On August 27, Pruitt was selected back to the active roster following an injury to Dany Jiménez. In 39 appearances for Oakland, he registered a 4.23 ERA with 38 strikeouts in 55.1 innings of work. In 12 games with Las Vegas, he had a 3.27 ERA with 20 strikeouts in 22.0 innings pitched. On November 3, Pruitt was removed from the 40-man roster and sent outright to Triple–A. He elected free agency three days later.

On January 15, 2023, Pruitt re-signed with the Athletics on a minor league contract. He began the year with Triple-A Las Vegas, making 10 appearances and logging a 2.30 ERA with 16 strikeouts in 15.2 innings of work. On May 4, he had his contract selected to the active roster. In 38 games for Oakland, Pruitt registered a 2–6 record and 2.98 ERA with 30 strikeouts in 48 1/3 innings pitched. On October 4, Pruitt was removed from the 40–man roster and sent outright to Triple–A. On October 9, Pruitt elected free agency.

=== Texas Rangers ===
On January 10, 2024, Pruitt signed a minor league contract with the Texas Rangers. He began the year with the Triple–A Round Rock Express. On April 13, the Rangers selected Pruitt to the major league roster. Pruitt was placed on the injured list with a right meniscus injury on April 24, and was later transferred to the 60–day injured list on May 21. After struggling during his rehab assignments, Pruitt was released on July 28.

=== Oakland Athletics (second sint) ===
On August 20, 2024, Pruitt signed a minor league contract with the Oakland Athletics. In nine appearances (two starts) for the Triple-A Las Vegas Aviators, he struggled to a 1-2 record and 8.40 ERA with 14 strikeouts and one save over 15 innings of work. Pruitt elected free agency following the season on November 4.
