= Josh Naylor =

Canadian baseball player (born 1997)

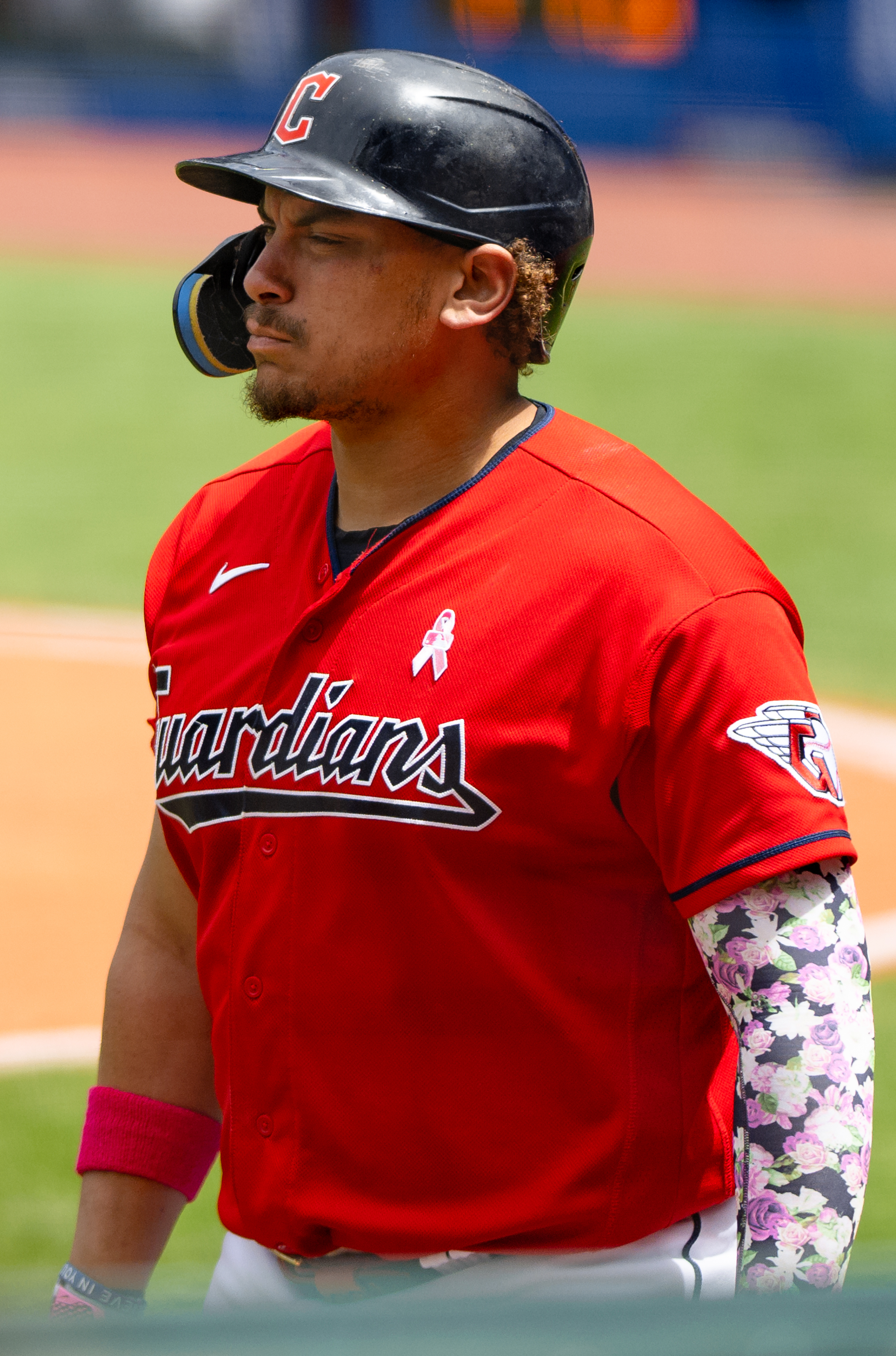
- Naylor with the Cleveland Guardians in 2023

Seattle Mariners – No. 12
- First baseman
- Born: June 22, 1997 (age 29); Mississaugua, Ontario, Canada
- Bats: Left Throws: Left

MLB debut
- May 24, 2019, for the San Diego Padres

MLB statistics (through 2026 season)
- Batting average: .268
- Home runs: 114
- Runs batted in: 492
- Stats at Baseball Reference

Teams
- San Diego Padres (2019–2020); Cleveland Indians / Guardians (2020–2024); Arizona Diamondbacks (2025); Seattle Mariners (2025–present)

Career highlights and awards
- All-Star (2024)
Medals
Men's baseball
Representing Canada
18U Baseball World Championship
Silver medal – second place	2012 Seoul	Team

Joshua-Douglas James Naylor (born June 22, 1997) is a Canadian professional baseball first baseman for the Seattle Mariners of Major League Baseball (MLB). He has previously played in MLB for the San Diego Padres, Cleveland Indians/Guardians, and Arizona Diamondbacks.

Naylor was selected 12th overall by the Miami Marlins in the first round of the 2015 MLB draft. He was later traded to the Padres in 2016 and made his MLB debut with the team in 2019. Naylor played with the Padres until August 2020, when he was traded to the Indians. He remained with the Indians through the 2024 season, during which he was named an MLB All-Star. After the 2024 season, Naylor was traded to the Diamondbacks and began the 2025 season with the team before being traded to the Mariners in July 2025.

Naylor plays for the Canada national baseball team. He competed in the 2017 and 2026 World Baseball Classic, serving as team captain in 2026. With the junior national team, Naylor became the first and only Canadian to compete in three different editions of the U-18 Baseball World Cup (2012, 2013, and 2015).

Naylor won the Tip O'Neill Award, presented annually by the Canadian Baseball Hall of Fame and Museum to the best Canadian baseball player, in 2023 and 2025.

== Early life and amateur career ==
Naylor was born on June 22, 1997, in Burlington, Ontario. Having grown up in Mississauga, a suburb immediately west of Toronto, he was a Toronto Blue Jays fan from a young age though he also was a Boston Red Sox fan. Naylor attended St. Joan of Arc Catholic Secondary School, graduating in 2015.

Naylor began his amateur career with the Ontario Blue Jays, an elite travel baseball team in the Canadian Premier Baseball League composed of top young players from the Greater Toronto Area and surrounding Southern Ontario cities. He was the youngest player on the team; he joined when he was 12 years old, while most of his teammates were aged 16 or older.

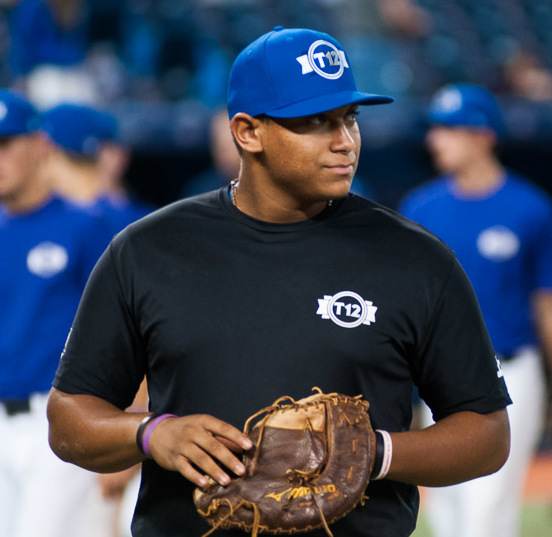
Naylor in 2014

Following his junior year of high school, Naylor was one of ten high school baseball players invited to the 2014 MLB Junior Select Home Run Derby during MLB All-Star Week at Target Field in Minneapolis, Minnesota, on July 13 and 14. He became the first Canadian to participate in the event. He finished second behind Luken Baker. The following month, Naylor was selected to play in the 2014 Perfect Game All-American Classic at Petco Park in San Diego, California, on August 10, becoming the second Canadian to do so after Gareth Morgan in 2013. Six days later, he also played in the 2014 Under Armour All-America Baseball Game at Wrigley Field in Chicago, Illinois, on August 16.

Naylor committed to play college baseball for the Texas Tech Red Raiders. In 2015, Perfect Game ranked Naylor among the top 50 best prospects in that year's Major League Baseball draft, and he earned selection to Baseball America's High School All-American First Team.

== Professional career ==
=== Draft and minor leagues (2015–2019) ===
Naylor was selected 12th overall by the Miami Marlins in the first round of the 2015 MLB draft on June 8. He signed with the Marlins after his June 25 graduation from St. Joan of Arc Catholic Secondary School for a $2.25 million signing bonus. He made his professional debut with the Rookie-level GCL Marlins. Naylor finished the 2015 season batting .327/.352/.418 with one home run and 16 runs batted in (RBIs) in 25 games.

Naylor began the 2016 season with the Single-A Greensboro Grasshoppers. In June, he was suspended without pay after injuring teammate and roommate Stone Garrett with a knife as part of a prank. After the incident, Marlins general manager Michael Hill said, "I don't think you'll see Josh Naylor goofing around with knives anymore." Midway through the season, Naylor was selected to participate in the 2016 All-Star Futures Game during MLB All-Star Week at Petco Park in San Diego, California, on July 10.

Later that month, the Marlins traded Naylor with Carter Capps, Jarred Cosart, and Luis Castillo to the San Diego Padres on July 29, for pitchers Andrew Cashner, Colin Rea, and Tayron Guerrero, and cash. Naylor was assigned to the Advanced-A Lake Elsinore Storm. He finished the 2016 season batting a combined .264/.302/.407 with 12 home runs and 75 RBIs in 122 games.

Naylor began the 2017 season with the Storm before being promoted to the Double-A San Antonio Missions midway through the season in July. He was again selected to play in the Futures Game. He finished the season batting a combined .280/.346/.415 with 10 home runs and 64 RBIs in 114 games.

Naylor played with the Missions in the 2018 season and began playing as an outfielder. He finished the season batting .297/.383/.447 with 17 home runs and 74 RBIs in 128 games.

Naylor began the 2019 season with the Triple-A El Paso Chihuahuas, batting .314/.389/.547 with 10 home runs and 42 RBIs in 54 games. Midway through the season, he was called up to MLB by the Padres on May 24.

=== San Diego Padres (2019–2020) ===
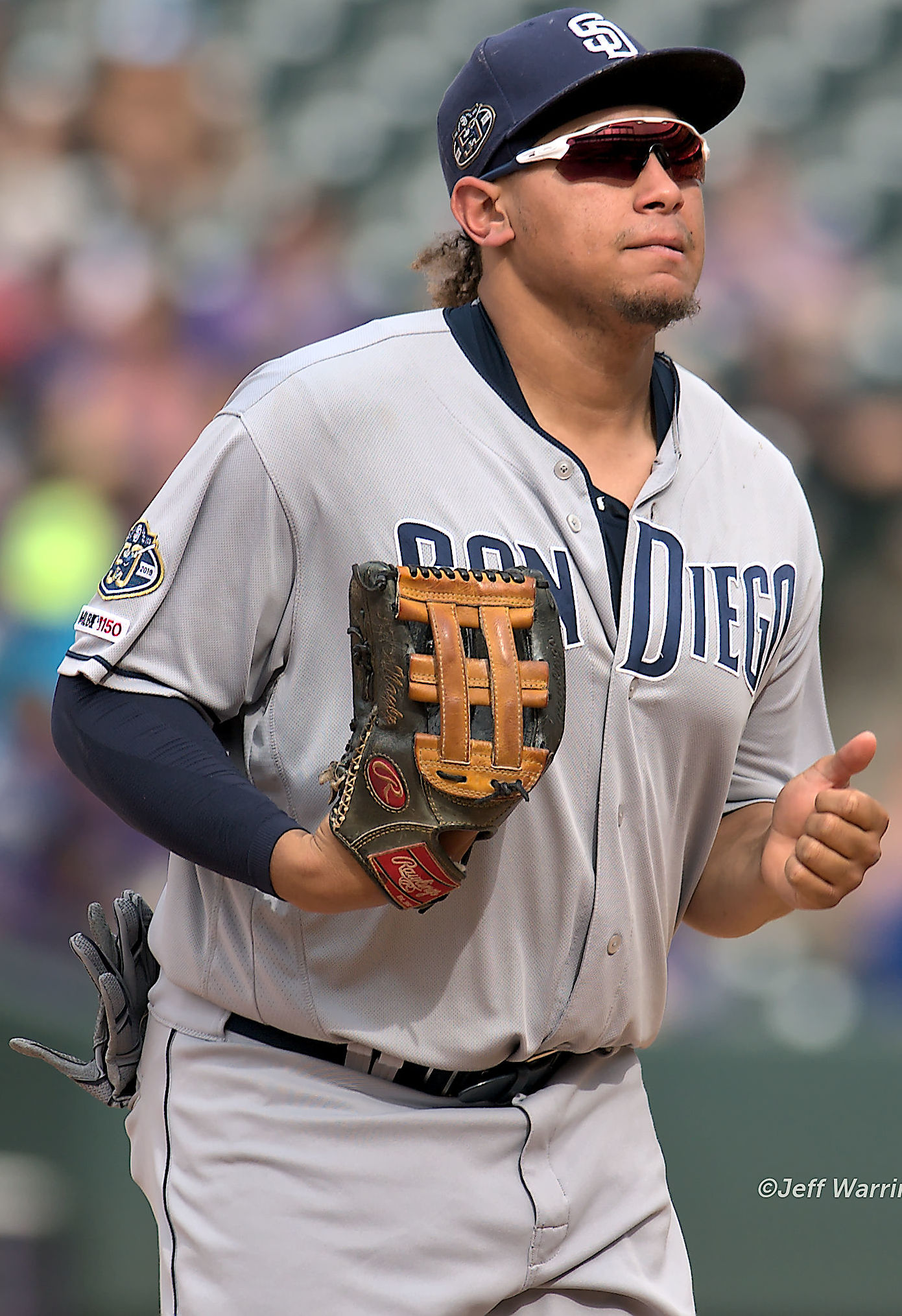
Naylor with the San Diego Padres in 2019

Naylor made his MLB debut on May 24, 2019 in a game against his hometown team, the Toronto Blue Jays, at Rogers Centre in Toronto, Ontario. The next game, he recorded his first career hit, an RBI double off pitcher Edwin Jackson on May 25. Naylor finished the 2019 season batting .249/.315/.403 with eight home runs and 32 RBIs in 94 games. Defensively, he committed six errors and had the lowest fielding percentage of any outfielder.

Naylor played in 18 games for the Padres during the 2020 season, batting .278/.316/.417 with one home run and four RBIs. He played multiple positions throughout the season, including designated hitter, first baseman, outfielder, and pinch hitter.

=== Cleveland Indians / Guardians (2020–2024) ===
==== 2020 ====
The San Diego Padres traded Naylor along with Austin Hedges, Cal Quantrill, and minor leaguers Gabriel Arias, Joey Cantillo, and Owen Miller, to the Cleveland Indians in exchange for Greg Allen, Matt Waldron, and Mike Clevinger on August 31, 2020. Naylor played in 22 games for the Indians during the 2020 season, batting .230/.277/.279 with two RBIs.

Naylor made his first career postseason appearance in the 2020 MLB postseason. During the American League (AL) Wild Card Series against the New York Yankees, he recorded five hits in his first five career postseason plate appearances, the first player in MLB history to do so. The Indians were eliminated from the playoffs after the Yankees swept them 2–0, and Naylor finished the series and thus the postseason going 5-for-7 at the plate, batting .714/.714/1.571 with one home run and three RBIs.

==== 2021–2022 ====
During a game against the Minnesota Twins on June 27, 2021, Naylor collided with second baseman Ernie Clement while trying to catch a pop-up in shallow right field. He broke and dislocated his ankle, which required season-ending surgery. Naylor finished the 2021 season batting .253/.301/.399 with seven home runs and 21 RBIs in 69 games. During his rehabilitation, Naylor's mother threw balled-up socks for him to hit to maintain his hand-eye coordination.

Naylor returned from his ankle injury in April 2022, missing the first week of the season. During a game against the Chicago White Sox on May 9, Naylor became the first player in MLB history to hit two home runs of three runs or more in the ninth inning or later of the same game. He also became the first player in MLB history to have at least eight runs batted in (RBIs) from the eighth inning on in a single game since RBIs became an official statistic in the 1920 season. After an RBI double in the top of the eight inning, his first home run was a game-tying grand slam off White Sox pitcher Liam Hendriks in the top of the ninth inning to tie the game 8–8. His second home run was a go-ahead three-run home run off White Sox pitcher Ryan Burr in the top of the 11th inning, which would win the game 12–9. Naylor finished the 2022 season batting .256/.319/.452 with 20 home runs and 79 RBIs in 122 games.

Naylor made his second career postseason appearance in the 2022 MLB postseason. After sweeping the Tampa Bay Rays 2–0 in the AL Wild Card Series, the Guardians were eliminated 3–2 by the New York Yankees in the AL Division Series (ALDS). Naylor finished the 2022 postseason batting .194/.194/.323 with one home run and three RBIs in seven games.

==== 2023–2024 ====
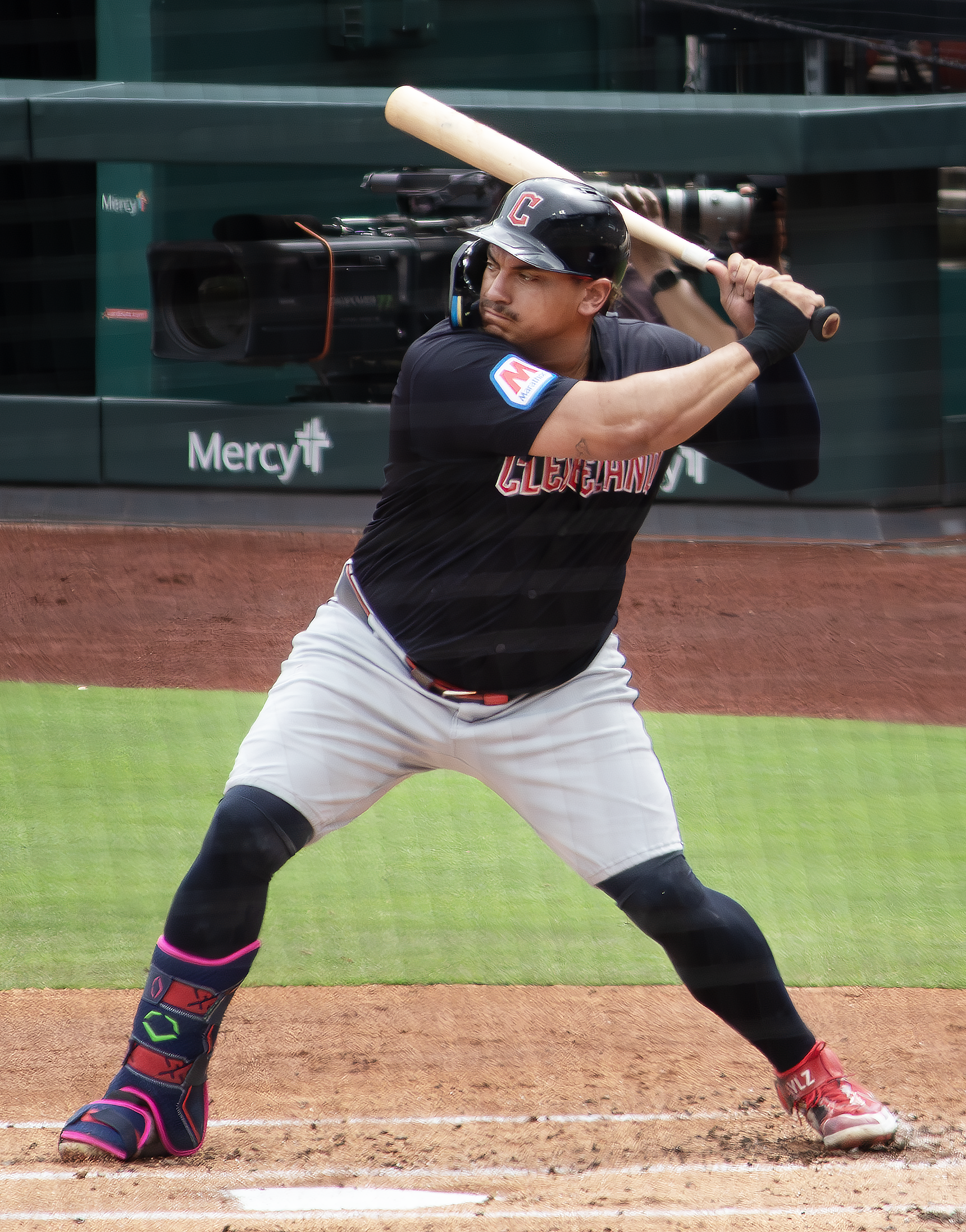
Naylor with the Cleveland Guardians in 2024

Naylor agreed to a one-year, $3.35 million contract with the Guardians on January 13, 2023, avoiding salary arbitration. After a 1-for-38 start to the season, he was one of the best hitters in June and July. He finished the season batting .308/.354/.489 with 17 home runs and 97 RBIs in 121 games. Naylor received the 2023 Tip O'Neill Award, presented annually by the Canadian Baseball Hall of Fame and Museum to the best Canadian baseball player; it was the first of his career.

Naylor earned his first career MLB All-Star selection in 2024. However, he fared worse after the All-Star break, batting .220 with a .717 on-base plus slugging (OPS). Naylor finished the regular season batting .243/.320/.456 with 31 home runs and 108 RBIs in 152 games.

During the postseason, the Guardians defeated the Detroit Tigers 3–2 in the ALDS to advance to the AL Championship Series (ALCS), where they were eliminated 4–1 by the New York Yankees. Naylor batted .225/.256/.275 with five RBIs in 10 postseason games.

=== Arizona Diamondbacks (2025) ===
Cleveland traded Naylor to the Arizona Diamondbacks on December 21, 2024 for pitcher Slade Cecconi and a competitive balance draft pick in the 2025 MLB draft, which was later used to select Canadian pitcher Will Hynes. Shortly thereafter, Naylor agreed to a one-year, $10.9 million contract in January 2025, avoiding his final opportunity for arbitration.

During a game against the Seattle Mariners on June 9, 2025, Naylor hit a walk-off grand slam in the bottom of the 11th inning off pitcher Carlos Vargas to win the game 8–4. Naylor played in 93 games for the Diamondbacks to start the season, batting .292/.360/.447 with 11 home runs, 59 RBIs, and 11 stolen bases.

=== Seattle Mariners (2025–present) ===
The Diamondbacks traded Naylor to the Mariners on July 24, 2025 for pitchers Ashton Izzi and Brandyn Garcia. On September 23, with the Mariners trailing 3–1 in the bottom of the eighth inning with two outs and the bases loaded against the Colorado Rockies, Naylor hit a bases-clearing double to give the Mariners a 4–3 lead. The Mariners went on to win the game, clinching a postseason berth. Three games later, during a game against the Los Angeles Dodgers on September 26, Naylor stole his 30th base, becoming the fourth first baseman in MLB history with at least 20 home runs and 30 stolen bases in a season. Naylor's successful base stealing came despite being one of the slowest runners in MLB. He was caught stealing only twice in 2025, both times with the Diamondbacks. Naylor played with the Mariners for the remainder of the 2025 season, batting .299/.341/.490 with nine home runs, 33 RBIs, and 19 stolen bases in 54 games. The Mariners won the AL West division.

The Mariners began the 2025 postseason against the Detroit Tigers in the ALDS. Naylor did not get a hit in the first three games, going 0-for-13, before logging three hits each in both Games 4 and 5, going 6-for-10 in the last two games of the series. The Mariners won the series 3–2 and advanced to the ALCS for the first time since 2001. The Mariners played against Naylor's hometown team, the Toronto Blue Jays. During Game 2 at Rogers Centre in Toronto on October 13, Naylor hit a two-run home run off pitcher Braydon Fisher in the top of the seventh inning to extend the Mariners' lead to 9–3. Naylor became the first Canadian-born player to hit a postseason home run against the Blue Jays. Naylor also became the first Canadian-born player to hit a postseason home run as a visiting player in Canada, as well as the fourth Canadian-born player to hit a postseason home run in Canada; he joined Russell Martin (October 9, 2016), Michael Saunders (October 17, 2016), and Vladimir Guerrero Jr. (October 4, 2025). The Mariners lost the series in seven games. Naylor finished the postseason batting .340/.392/.574 with three home runs and five RBIs in 12 games.

Following the season, Naylor became a free agent. He re-signed with the Mariners on a five-year, $92.5 million contract on November 17. He received his second Tip O'Neill Award, presented annually to the best Canadian baseball player; he had previously won the award in 2023.

After a slow start, Naylor hit his first two home runs of the 2026 season on April 13. Naylor was caught stealing twice on April 28, ending his perfect base stealing streak with Seattle.

== International career ==
Naylor joined the Canada junior national baseball team at the age of 15 to compete in the 2012 18U Baseball World Championship in Seoul, South Korea. The team won the silver medal, losing 6–2 to the United States on September 8, Canada's best finish at the U-18 Baseball World Cup since winning the gold medal at the 1991 World Junior Baseball Championship in Brandon, Manitoba. Throughout the tournament, Naylor batted .235/.289/.294 with three runs batted in (RBIs). The following year, he competed in the 2013 18U Baseball World Cup in Taichung, Taiwan, where the team finished in seventh place after defeating Australia 17–3 on September 5. In the tournament, Naylor batted .333/.400/.444 with five RBIs. Naylor then competed in the 2014 COPABE 18U Pan American Championship in La Paz, Mexico. The team won the bronze medal after defeating Mexico 9–7 on September 14 and subsequently qualified for the 2015 U-18 Baseball World Cup in Osaka, Japan. Naylor competed in that tournament, becoming the first and only Canadian to compete in three editions of the U-18 Baseball World Cup (2012, 2013, and 2015). Canada finished sixth at the 2015 tournament. Naylor was named to the All-World Team as a first baseman after batting .484/.556/.903 with three home runs and 11 RBIs in eight games; he ranked first in home runs (3) and hits (15), and second in batting average (.484), RBIs (11), and runs scored (10).

Naylor represented Canada at the 2017 World Baseball Classic (WBC) at the age of 19, making him the youngest player on the roster. He batted 0-for-2 in two games. He declined to play in the 2023 WBC, due to an ankle injury. Naylor was Canada's captain at the 2026 WBC. He hit .200 with two walks as Canada advanced out of pool play for the first time at the WBC.

== Player profile ==
Naylor is 5 feet 10 inches (1.78 m) tall and weighs 235 pounds (107 kg). As a prospect, he profiled as a power hitter, and Greg Hamilton, the coach of the Canada junior national baseball team, described Naylor's hitting approach as "advanced" in 2013. In his first three Major League Baseball (MLB) seasons, Naylor was a below average hitter, hitting lots of ground balls but not swinging at many pitches. He also was a poor defensive outfielder. Starting in 2022, he became a full-time first baseman, lowered his strikeout rate, and improved his batting average and power.

Naylor is known for wearing custom cleats and belts and has ordered many cleats from a company owned by former MLB pitcher Jeremy Guthrie.

== Personal life ==
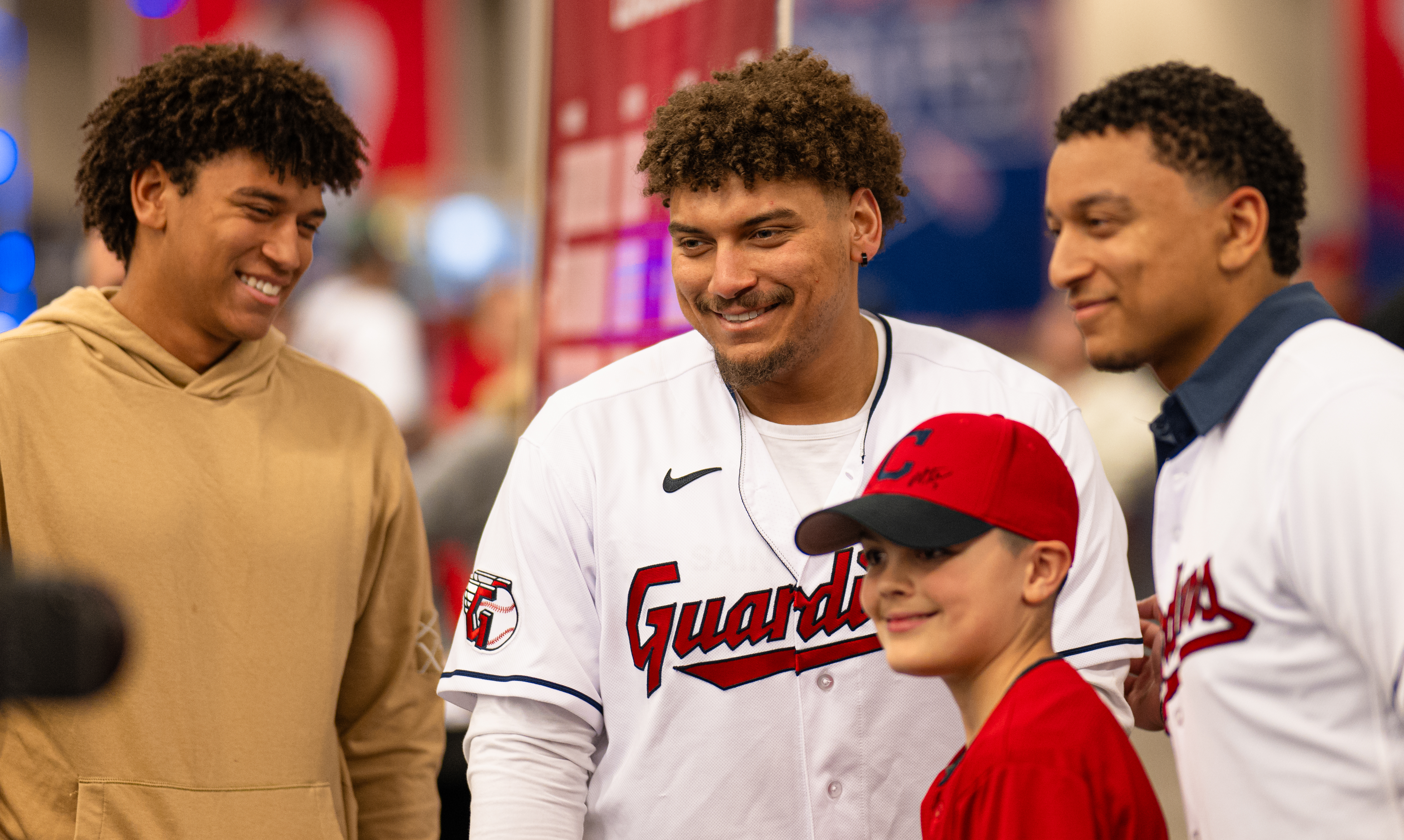
Naylor (center) with his brothers Bo (right) and Myles (left) and a fan (bottom)

Naylor is biracial, with a white Canadian father and a mother of Jamaican descent.

Naylor has two brothers who were also first-round selections in the MLB draft. Bo Naylor is a catcher for the Milwaukee Brewers, while their youngest brother, Myles Naylor, plays in the Athletics' farm system. In addition to baseball, Naylor and his brothers grew up playing ice hockey. Naylor and his brothers are second cousins of fellow Major League Baseball (MLB) player Denzel Clarke, a center fielder for the Athletics. Naylor's mother and Clarke's mother, Donna Smellie, are cousins.

Naylor married his high school sweetheart, Chantel Collado, on January 4, 2025, in Vaughan, Ontario. Collado, a Bachata singer who performs under the mononym Chantel, is a fellow native of Mississauga and met Naylor when both attended St. Joan of Arc Catholic Secondary School. They attended their high school prom together in June 2015. Their first child was born in October 2025 while Naylor was playing in the 2025 ALDS. Former Cleveland teammate Myles Straw, who played for the Blue Jays during the 2025 ALCS, attended Naylor's baby shower.
