= Bo Naylor =

Canadian baseball player (born 2000)

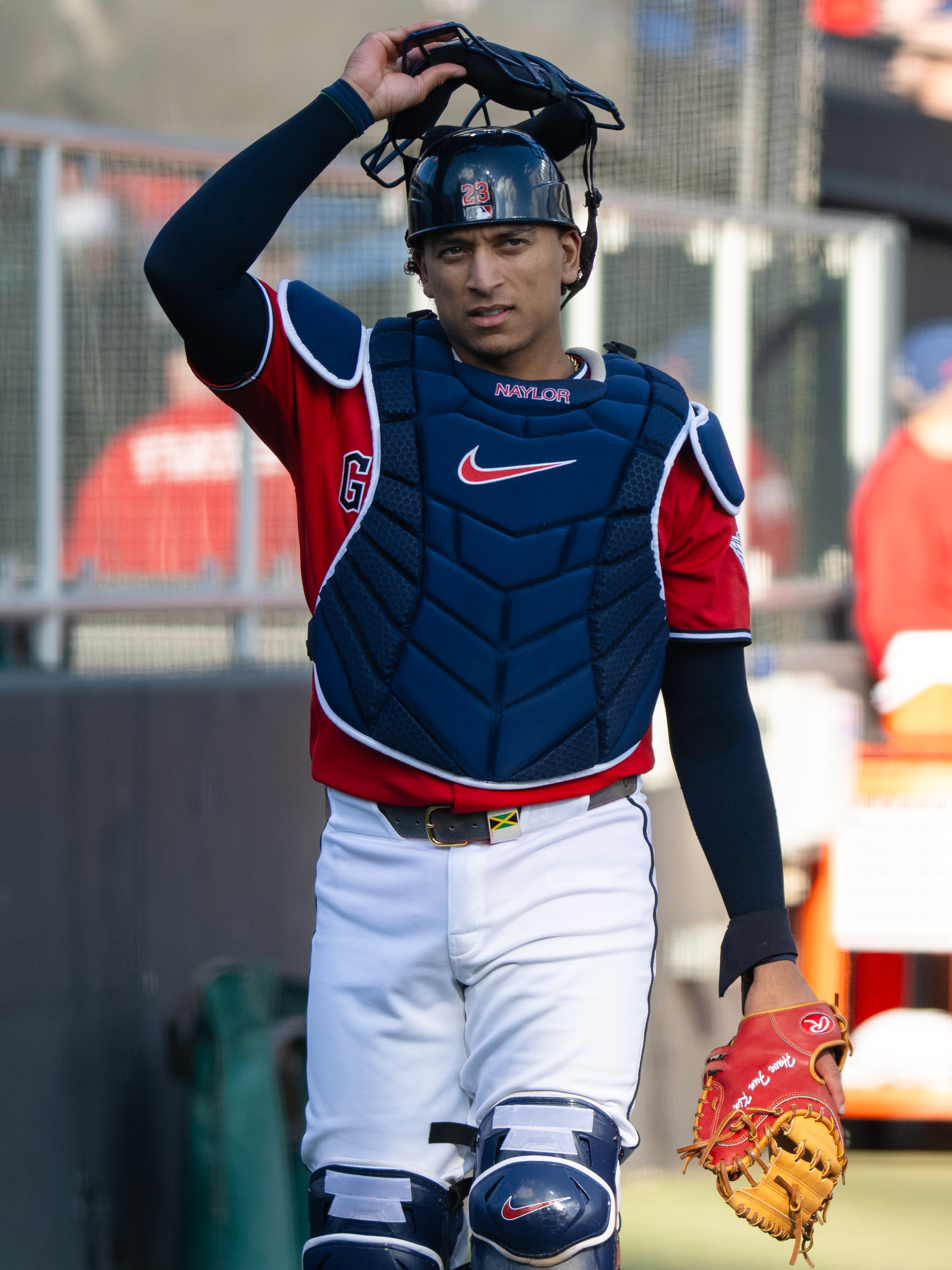
- Naylor with the Cleveland Guardians in 2026

Milwaukee Brewers – No. 14
- Catcher
- Born: February 21, 2000 (age 26); Mississauga, Ontario, Canada
- Bats: Left Throws: Right

MLB debut
- October 1, 2022, for the Cleveland Guardians

MLB statistics (through 2026 season)
- Batting average: .200
- Home runs: 41
- Runs batted in: 128
- Stats at Baseball Reference

Teams
- Cleveland Guardians (2022–2026); Milwaukee Brewers (2026–present)

Noah-Gibson James Washington "Bo" Naylor (born February 21, 2000) is a Canadian professional baseball catcher for the Milwaukee Brewers of Major League Baseball (MLB). He has previously played in MLB for the Cleveland Guardians. Naylor was selected by the Cleveland Indians in the first round of the 2018 MLB draft and made his MLB debut in 2022.

== Amateur career ==
Naylor attended St. Joan of Arc Catholic Secondary School in Mississauga, Ontario and played for the Canadian junior national baseball team. He appeared in the Under Armour All-America Game and the 2017 Under-18 Baseball World Cup, held in Thunder Bay, Ontario. He committed to play college baseball for the Texas A&M Aggies.

== Professional career ==
=== Cleveland Guardians ===
The Cleveland Indians selected Naylor in the first round, with the 29th pick, in the 2018 Major League Baseball draft. He signed with Cleveland, forgoing college ball, for a $2,578,138 signing bonus. He played that summer for the Arizona League Indians, with a batting average of .274 with two home runs and 17 runs batted in (RBI) in 33 games played. Naylor spent the 2019 season with the Lake County Captains. Over 107 games, he batted .243 with 11 home runs, 65 RBI, and 104 strikeouts.

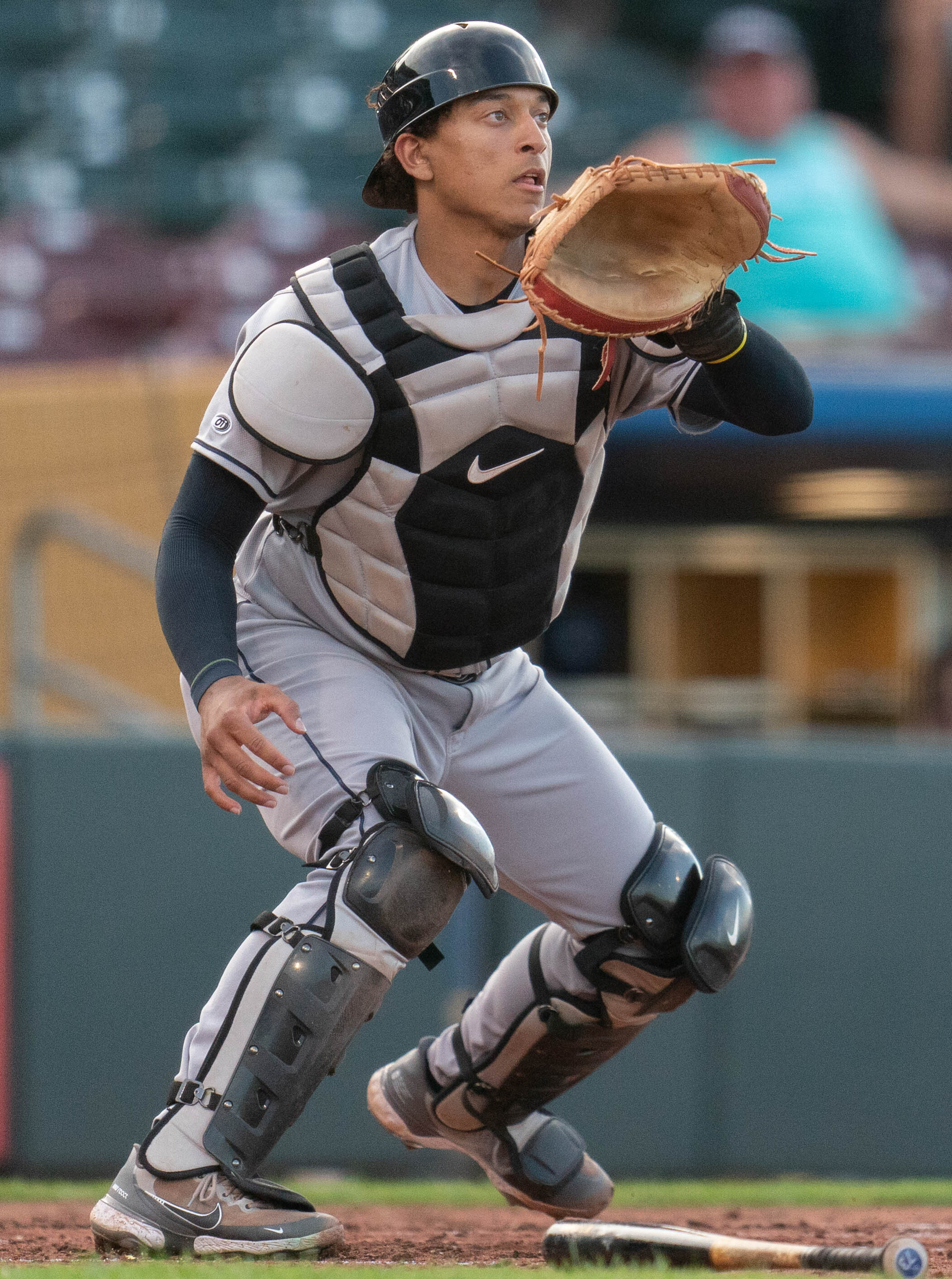
Naylor with the Columbus Clippers in 2022

Naylor did not play in a game in 2020 due to the cancellation of the minor league season because of the COVID-19 pandemic, though he was on the team's initial 60-man player pool for the abbreviated season. In 2021, he played with the Akron RubberDucks, slashing .188/.280/.332 with 10 home runs and 44 RBI over 87 games. In June, Naylor was selected to play in the All-Star Futures Game. In 2022 with Akron, Naylor had a .271 average, .898 OPS and six home runs. He was promoted to the Columbus Clippers in June.

The Guardians selected Naylor's contract on October 1, 2022, adding him to their active roster. He made his major league debut that night against the Kansas City Royals as a defensive replacement. He made his first start the next day. He batted 0-for-8 with 5 strikeouts in five October games against the Royals. He was the third catcher on Cleveland's playoff roster but did not play in the postseason.

In March 2023, Naylor played for Canada in the 2023 World Baseball Classic. The Guardians optioned him to Columbus to start the 2023 season. He was a top-70 prospect, according to MLB.com and Baseball America. After appearing in one MLB game in May, he returned to Cleveland for good in late June. He earned his first MLB hit on June 21, a single against the Oakland Athletics. He played in 67 games for Cleveland in 2023, hitting .237/.339/.470 with 11 home runs and 32 RBI.

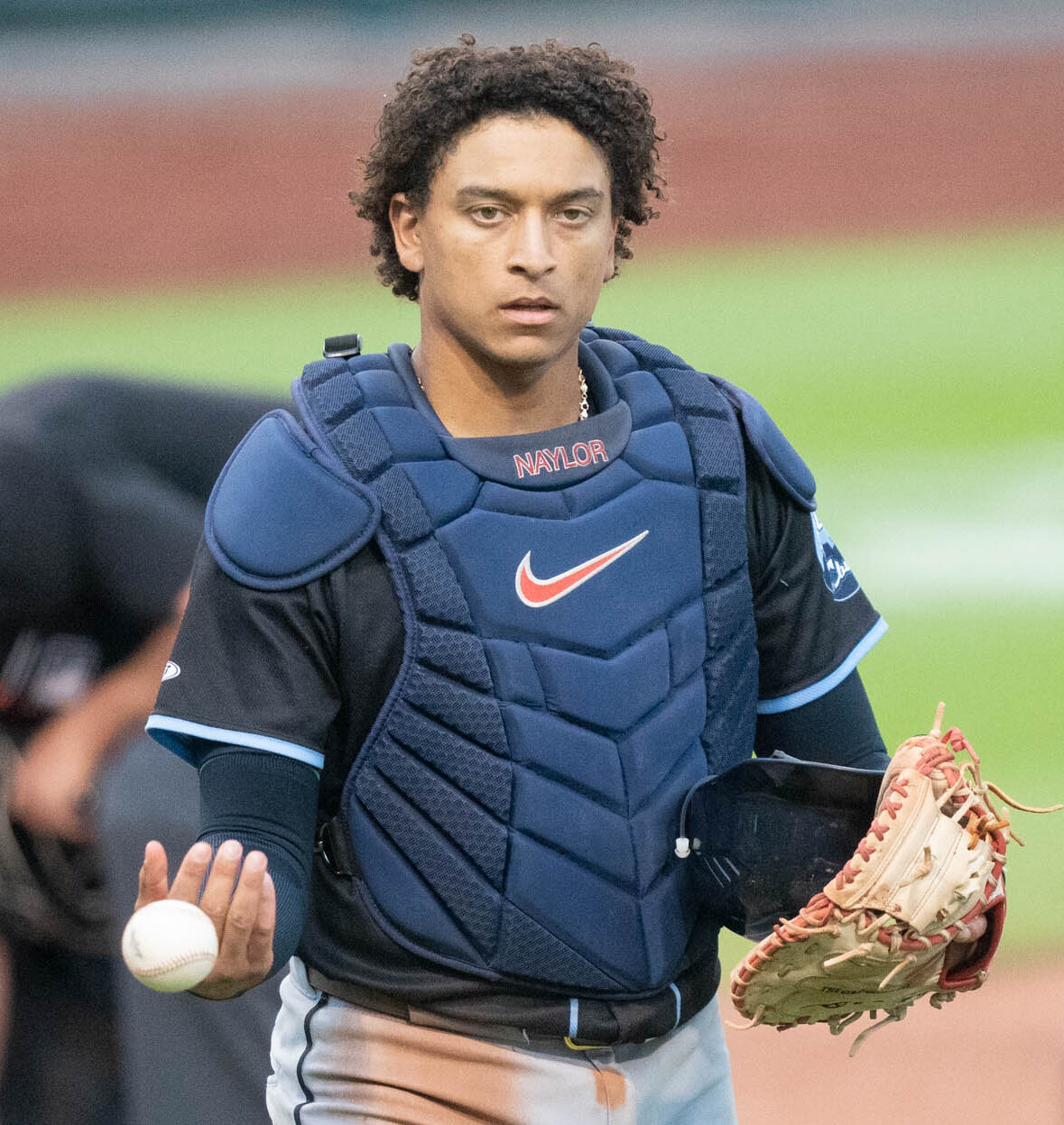
Naylor with the Columbus Clippers in 2026

On May 4, 2024, Naylor hit his first career grand slam off Reid Detmers of the Los Angeles Angels. He finished his first full season in the majors batting .201/.264/.350 with 13 home runs. He was an average batter from June through August, faring poorly in other months. He was above average defensively, excelling at pitch framing, according to Statcast. Naylor played all 10 Cleveland postseason games, going hitless in the first seven games before getting 4 hits, including 2 doubles, in the last three American League (AL) Championship Series games.

Naylor played in 123 games for the second consecutive season in 2025, slashing .195/.282/.379. He batted 1-for-8 as the Guardians lost in the AL Wild Card Series.

On May 9, 2026, Naylor was optioned to Triple-A Columbus after struggling at the start of the season, batting .143 with 2 home runs and 7 RBI through 84 plate appearances to make room for newly acquired catcher Patrick Bailey from the San Francisco Giants.

=== Milwaukee Brewers ===
On August 1, 2026, the Guardians traded Naylor and Codi Heuer to the Milwaukee Brewers in exchange for Craig Yoho and Blake Perkins. Naylor appeared in three games for the Brewers, hitting a home run with 3 RBI. Overall in 2026, combined for both teams he played for in 2026, Naylor appeared in 31 total games with a .154 batting average, 3 home runs, and 10 RBI. The Brewers finished with a 103–59 record, clinching the NL central division. Although Naylor did not make any appearance during the playoffs, the Brewers won the 2026 World Series against the Tampa Bay Rays, which was the Brewers' first championship in franchise history.

== Personal life ==
Naylor was born in Canada and is of Jamaican descent through his mother. His older brother, Josh Naylor, was his teammate with Cleveland from 2022 to 2024. Their younger brother, Myles Naylor, plays in the Athletics organization, as does their cousin Denzel Clarke.
