= Kevin Smellie =

American football player (born 1966)

No. 5, 33
- Position: Fullback

Personal information
- Born: July 27, 1966 (age 60); Battersea, London, England
- Listed height: 5 ft 10 in (1.78 m)
- Listed weight: 190 lb (86 kg)

Career information
- High school: Erindale (Mississauga, Ontario)
- College: UMass (1985–1988)
- CFL draft: 1989: 1st round, 2nd overall pick

Career history
- Toronto Argonauts (1990–1992, 1994)

Awards and highlights
- Grey Cup champion (1991)

Kevin Smellie (born July 27, 1966) is an English-Canadian former professional gridiron football fullback who played for the Toronto Argonauts of the Canadian Football League (CFL). He played college football for the UMass Minutemen. Smellie was selected second overall by the Saskatchewan Roughriders in the first round of the 1989 CFL draft. He made his CFL debut with the Argonauts in 1990.

== Early life ==
Smellie was born on July 27, 1966, in Battersea, London, England, to a father who worked as a welder. He moved with his family to Toronto, Ontario, Canada, at the age of two. Smellie grew up in Mississauga and attended Erindale High School.

== College career ==
Smellie played college football for the UMass Minutemen over offers from Iowa and Purdue. His four-year career spanned from 1985 to 1988, during which he was a four-year letterman and a three-year starter. Smellie finished his college career second in school history with 2,228 rushing yards. He also scored 21 rushing touchdowns.

Smellie earned a degree in early childhood education from the University of Massachusetts Amherst.

== Professional career ==
Smellie was selected second overall by the Saskatchewan Roughriders in the first round of the 1989 CFL draft. However, he sat out the 1989 season after refusing to play for any CFL team west of Windsor, Ontario. Smellie's deep religious conviction required him to worship at the Toronto Church of Christ in Scarborough. The only CFL teams he would play for were his childhood favourite team the Toronto Argonauts, the Hamilton Tiger-Cats, or the Ottawa Rough Riders. Smellie worked a sales job for Mantek while sitting out the 1989 season.

In mid-June 1990, the Roughriders traded Smellie to the Argonauts for a first-round pick in the 1991 CFL draft. He dressed in all 54 games for the Argonauts from 1990 to 1992, winning the 79th Grey Cup in 1991. He retired from professional football in January 1993. However, Smellie unretired in March 1994 and dressed in all 18 games for the Argonauts that year. He was released in March 1995. He finished his CFL career with totals of 72 games dressed, 191 carries for 938 yards and 11 touchdowns, 50 receptions for 482 yards and five touchdowns, six kick returns for 97 yards, and 23 special teams tackles.

== Personal life ==
Smellie's older sister, Donna Smellie, is a former Olympian who competed in the women's heptathlon at the 1984 Summer Olympics. His nephew, Denzel Clarke, is a professional baseball center fielder for the Athletics of Major League Baseball (MLB).
