= Myles Naylor =

Canadian baseball player (born 2005)

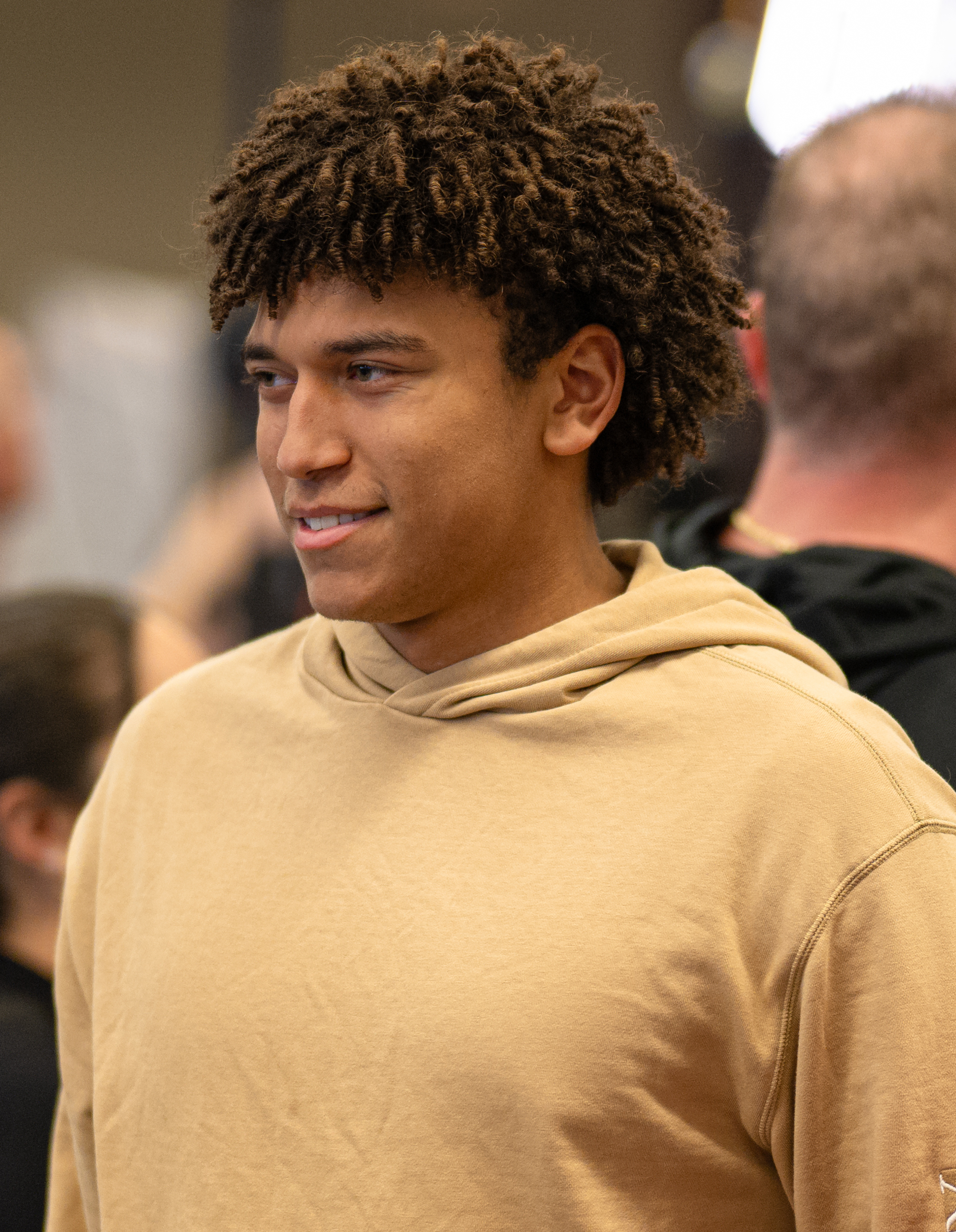
- Naylor in 2024

Athletics
- Third baseman
- Born: April 15, 2005 (age 21); Mississauga, Ontario, Canada
- Bats: Right Throws: Right
- Stats at Baseball Reference

Myles-Jaxon Douglas James Naylor (born April 15, 2005) is a Canadian professional baseball third baseman in the Athletics organization.

== Career ==
Naylor attended St. Joan of Arc Catholic Secondary School in Mississauga, Ontario, Canada. He committed to play college baseball at Texas Tech University.

Naylor was drafted by the Oakland Athletics with the 39th overall pick in the 2023 Major League Baseball draft. He signed with the Athletics on July 17, 2023 for $2,202,500.

Naylor made his professional debut in 2023 for the Arizona Complex League Athletics and, after two games, was promoted to the Stockton Ports. He hit .214 with six home runs over 34 games between both teams. In 2024, Naylor played with Stockton and batted .192 with 11 home runs and 58 runs batted in over 115 games. Naylor returned to Stockton in 2025, batting .185 in 81 games. He advanced to High-A in May 2026, joining the Lansing Lugnuts.

== Personal life ==
Naylor was born in Canada and is of Jamaican descent through his mother. His older brothers are Milwaukee Brewers catcher Bo Naylor and Seattle Mariners first baseman Josh Naylor. Denzel Clarke is one of his cousins.
