= Denzel Clarke =

Canadian baseball player (born 2000)

Athletics – No. 1
- Center fielder
- Born: May 1, 2000 (age 26); Toronto, Ontario, Canada
- Bats: Right Throws: Right

MLB debut
- May 23, 2025, for the Athletics

MLB statistics (through 2026 season)
- Batting average: .205
- Home runs: 3
- Runs batted in: 14
- Stats at Baseball Reference

Teams
- Athletics (2025–present)

Denzel Leslie Clarke (born May 1, 2000) is a Canadian professional baseball center fielder for the Athletics of Major League Baseball (MLB). He played college baseball for the Cal State Northridge Matadors. Clarke was selected by the Oakland Athletics in the fourth round of the 2021 MLB draft and made his MLB debut with the Athletics in 2025.

== Early life ==
Clarke was born on May 1, 2000, in Toronto, Ontario. A native of Pickering, he attended Everest Academy in Thornhill, graduating in 2018.

== College career ==
Clarke was selected by the New York Mets in the 36th round of the 2018 MLB draft, but he chose not to sign a professional contract with the team. Instead, he played college baseball for the Cal State Northridge Matadors. Clarke's college career spanned three seasons from 2019 to 2021. In 2019, Clarke played summer league baseball with the Kokomo Jackrabbits of the Northwoods League.

== Professional career ==
=== Draft and minor leagues ===
After a three-season college baseball career at Cal State Northridge, Clarke was selected 127th overall by the Oakland Athletics in the fourth round of the 2021 MLB draft. He signed with the team and made his professional debut with the ACL Athletics. Clarke started the 2022 season with the Single-A Stockton Ports before being promoted to the High-A Lansing Lugnuts. In July, he was selected to play in the All-Star Futures Game during MLB All-Star Week. Clarke finished the 2022 season batting a combined .248/.365/.469 with 15 home runs, 47 RBIs, and 30 stolen bases in 93 games. He spent the 2023 season with the Double-A Midland RockHounds, batting .261/.381/.496 with 12 home runs, 43 RBIs, and 11 stolen bases in 64 games. Clarke remained with the RockHounds for the 2024 season, batting .269/.339/.446 with 13 home runs, 53 RBIs, and 36 stolen bases in 116 games. After the 2024 season, the Athletics added Clarke to their 40-man roster to protect him from the Rule 5 draft. He was optioned to the Triple-A Las Vegas Aviators to begin the 2025 season. Clarke batted .286/.436/.419 with 21 RBIs and seven stolen bases in 31 games for the Aviators before being called up to the MLB by the Athletics on May 23, 2025.

=== Athletics (2025–present) ===
Clarke made his Major League Baseball (MLB) debut on May 23, 2025. He hit his first career home run on May 31, against his hometown team, the Toronto Blue Jays, at Rogers Centre. Clarke became a standout center fielder during his rookie season after several notable wall climbs, robbing batters of home runs.

On May 21, 2026, it was announced that Clarke had suffered a hamstring strain during a rehab game that would sideline him through the All-Star break. He was placed on the 60-day injured list on May 26. Clarke was activated from the injured list on September 1.

== International career ==
Clarke has represented Canada internationally multiple times. He played on the U-18 national team during the 2017 Baseball World Cup, where Canada finished fourth. Clarke has also twice played for Team Canada in the World Baseball Classic, in 2023 and 2026.

== Personal life ==
Clarke is of Jamaican descent.

Clarke comes from a family of athletes. His mother, Donna Smellie, is a former Olympian who competed in the women's heptathlon at the 1984 Summer Olympics. His maternal uncle, Kevin Smellie, played professional football for the Toronto Argonauts in the Canadian Football League (CFL). Clarke's cousins include sprinter Gavin Smellie, as well as fellow Major League Baseball (MLB) players Josh, Bo, and Myles Naylor. Clarke's mother, Donna, and the Naylor brothers' mother, Jenice, are cousins.
