= 2024 American League Championship Series =

Team (Wins)	Managers	Season
New York Yankees (4)	Aaron Boone	94–68 (.580), GA: 3
Cleveland Guardians (1)	Stephen Vogt	92–69 (.571), GA: 6 1/2
- Dates: October 14–19
- MVP: Giancarlo Stanton (New York)
- Umpires: Vic Carapazza, Mike Estabrook, Dan Iassogna (crew chief), Gabe Morales, Alan Porter, Chris Segal, Jansen Visconti

Broadcast
- Television: TBS; TruTV (Datacast); Max
- TV announcers: Brian Anderson, Ron Darling, Jeff Francoeur, and Lauren Jbara (TBS); Jon Morosi, Dexter Fowler, and Mike Petriello (TruTV)
- Radio: ESPN
- Radio announcers: Karl Ravech, Eduardo Pérez, and Tim Kurkjian
- ALDS: New York Yankees over Kansas City Royals (3–1); Cleveland Guardians over Detroit Tigers (3–2)

The 2024 American League Championship Series (ALCS) was the best-of-seven playoff in Major League Baseball's 2024 postseason between the top-seeded New York Yankees and the second-seeded Cleveland Guardians for the American League (AL) pennant and the right to play in the 2024 World Series. The Yankees won the series, four games to one, to win their 41st AL pennant and first since 2009. For his performance, Yankees hitter Giancarlo Stanton won the AL Championship Series Most Valuable Player Award.

The series began on October 14 and ended on October 19. TBS/Max televised all games in the United States.

The Yankees would go on to lose in the 2024 World Series to the Los Angeles Dodgers in five games. This was the first ALCS since 2016 without the Houston Astros participating in the series.

== Background ==
This is the first American League Championship Series since 2016 to not feature the Houston Astros, who were swept by the Detroit Tigers in the Wild Card Series. This brought an end to the Astros' streak of seven consecutive ALCS appearances (2017–2023), the most consecutive LCS appearances in the American League and the second-most consecutive LCS appearances after the Atlanta Braves' consecutive NLCS appearances of eight (1991–1999, excluding 1994 that was not played due to a players' strike).

The New York Yankees qualified for the postseason as the American League East division winner and the league's top seed. They clinched a playoff berth on September 18, returning to the postseason for the seventh time in eight years. They clinched the division on September 26 with a win over the Baltimore Orioles, which is their third divisional title in six years (2019, 2022, and this year). They are playing in their 59th postseason in franchise history, the most postseason appearances by a single team in Major League Baseball history. In the Division Series, they defeated the Kansas City Royals in four games to advance to the American League Championship Series for the 19th time in franchise history, the fourth time in eight years (2017, 2019, 2022, and this year), and their first ALCS appearance where their opponent is not the Houston Astros since 2012. The Yankees were attempting to win their record 41st American League pennant and return to the World Series for the first time since they won their record 27th championship title in 2009, which would end their 15-year World Series appearance drought.

The Cleveland Guardians qualified for the postseason as the American League Central division winner and the league's second seed. They clinched a playoff berth on September 19, returning to the postseason for the seventh time in 12 years. They clinched the division on September 21 with the Kansas City Royals' loss to the San Francisco Giants, which is their second division title in three years. In the Division Series, they defeated the Detroit Tigers in five games to advance to the American League Championship Series for the first time since 2016. Overall, this is their seventh ALCS appearance in franchise history. The Guardians were attempting to return to the World Series for the first time since 2016 when they lost in seven games as the Cleveland Indians to the Chicago Cubs. The Guardians currently hold the longest active championship drought in Major League Baseball for 76 years since they last won their championship in 1948.

With the New York Mets having clinched an NLCS berth October 9th, this was the farthest that both New York teams in Major League Baseball have gone in the postseason since 2000, which was when the Yankees beat the Mets in the World Series in five games.

This series marked the seventh postseason meeting between the two teams, with the Yankees having won four of the previous six meetings. Cleveland defeated New York in the ALDS in 1997 and 2007, while New York prevailed in the 1998 ALCS, 2017 ALDS, 2020 AL Wild Card, and most recently the 2022 ALDS. Both the Yankees and Guardians missed the postseason in 2023. In six head-to-head matchups during the 2024 regular season, the Yankees won four and the Guardians won two.

== Summary ==
New York won the series, 4–1.

Game	Date	Score	Location	Time	Attendance
1	October 14	Cleveland Guardians – 2, New York Yankees – 5	Yankee Stadium	3:01	47,264
2	October 15	Cleveland Guardians – 3, New York Yankees – 6	Yankee Stadium	3:26	47,054
3	October 17	New York Yankees – 5, Cleveland Guardians – 7 (10)	Progressive Field	3:52	32,531
4	October 18	New York Yankees – 8, Cleveland Guardians – 6	Progressive Field	3:27	35,263
5	October 19	New York Yankees – 5, Cleveland Guardians – 2 (10)	Progressive Field	3:36	32,545

== Game summaries ==
=== Game 1 ===
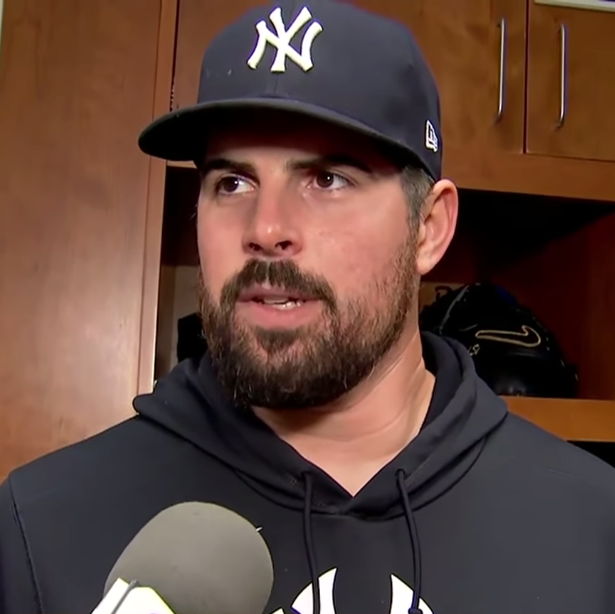
Carlos Rodón allowed one run over six innings and was the winning pitcher in Game 1.

October 14, 2024 7:38 pm (EDT) at Yankee Stadium at The Bronx, New York 60 °F (16 °C), Cloudy
Team	1	2	3	4	5	6	7	8	9	R	H	E
Cleveland	0	0	0	0	0	1	0	1	0	2	6	0
New York	0	0	3	1	0	0	1	0	X	5	6	1
WP: Carlos Rodón (1–0) LP: Alex Cobb (0–1) Sv: Luke Weaver (1); Home runs: CLE: Brayan Rocchio (1); NYY: Juan Soto (1), Giancarlo Stanton (1); Attendance: 47,264; Boxscore

Game 1 featured starting pitchers Carlos Rodón for the Yankees and Alex Cobb for the Guardians. Juan Soto opened the scoring in the bottom of the third, hitting a solo home run off Cobb to put the Yankees on the board. The Yankees then scored two more runs on a wild pitch, with Aaron Judge and then Giancarlo Stanton reaching home on separate pitches by Joey Cantillo. In the bottom of the fourth, Judge added another run, plating Gleyber Torres with a sacrifice fly to extend the Yankees' lead to 4–0. In the top of the sixth, Brayan Rocchio hit a solo home run off Carlos Rodón to put the Guardians on the board and cut their deficit to 4–1. In the bottom of the seventh, Stanton hit a solo home run off Erik Sabrowski to extend the Yankees' lead to 5–1. In the top of the eighth, Steven Kwan hit an RBI single to score Andrés Giménez, cutting the Guardians' deficit to 5–2. Luke Weaver closed out the win by striking out Austin Hedges swinging for the Yankees to take Game 1 and the 1–0 series lead.

With the victory, the Yankees won their first League Championship Series game since Game 5 of the 2019 ALCS.

=== Game 2 ===
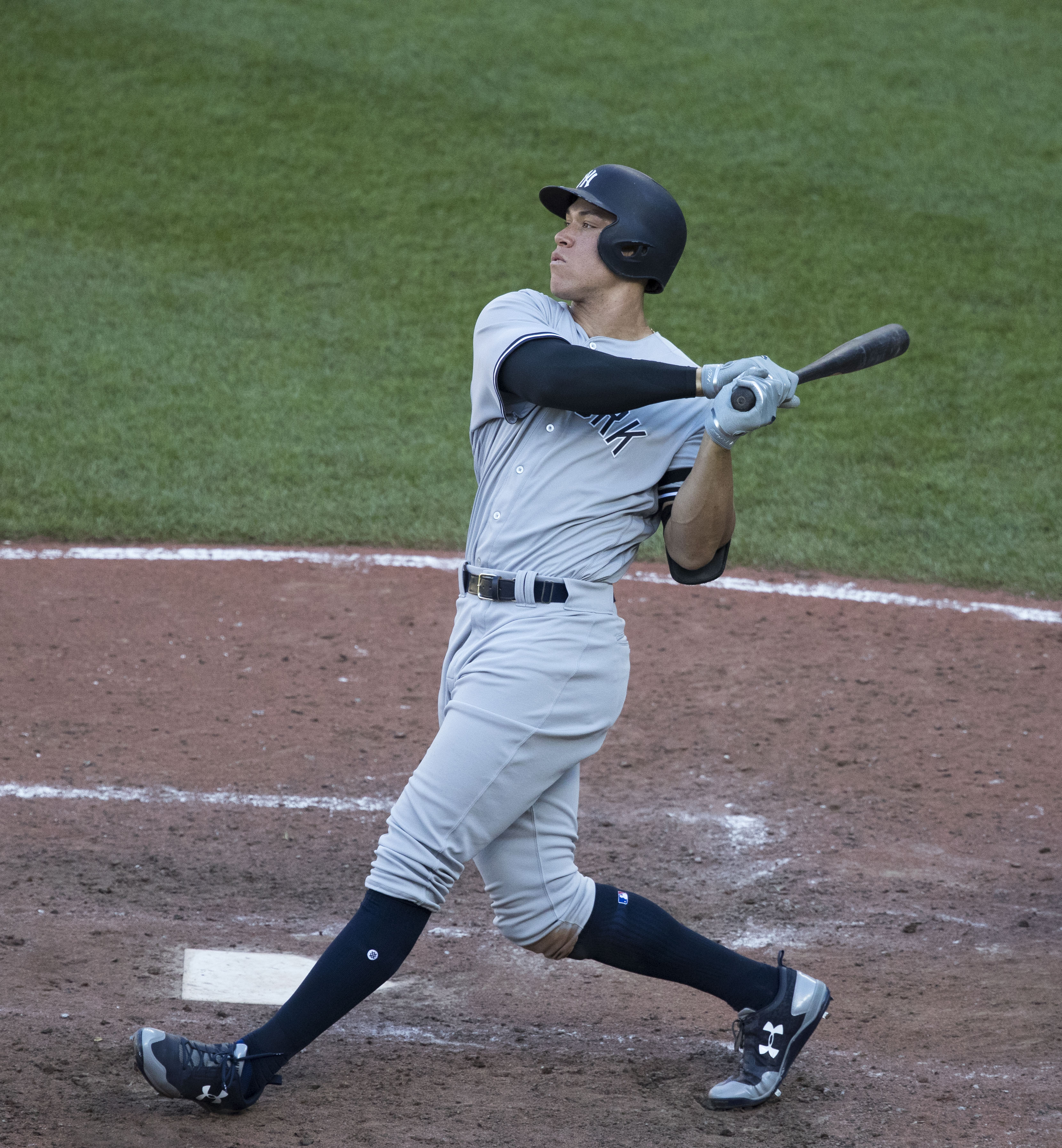
Aaron Judge drove in 3 runs for the Yankees and hit his first home run of the 2024 postseason in Game 2.

October 15, 2024 7:38 pm (EDT) at Yankee Stadium at The Bronx, New York 52 °F (11 °C), Partly Cloudy
Team	1	2	3	4	5	6	7	8	9	R	H	E
Cleveland	0	0	0	0	2	0	0	0	1	3	8	2
New York	1	2	0	0	0	1	2	0	X	6	11	0
WP: Clay Holmes (1–0) LP: Tanner Bibee (0–1); Home runs: CLE: José Ramírez (1); NYY: Aaron Judge (1); Attendance: 47,054; Boxscore

Game 2 featured starting pitchers Gerrit Cole for the Yankees and Tanner Bibee for the Guardians. The Yankees started the scoring for Game 2 in the bottom of the first when Aaron Judge reached first base on a fielding error by Brayan Rocchio, scoring Gleyber Torres. In the bottom of the second, Alex Verdugo hit an RBI double, scoring Anthony Volpe. Then Judge hit a sacrifice fly, scoring Anthony Rizzo and increasing the Yankees' lead to 3–0. In the top of the fifth, Josh Naylor hit a sacrifice fly, scoring Steven Kwan as the Guardians cut the lead to 3–1. Then Will Brennan grounded into a force out at first base as he allowed Kyle Manzardo to score to cut the Yankees' lead to 3–2. In the bottom of the sixth, Rizzo hit an RBI double, scoring Volpe and giving the Yankees a 4–2 lead. In the bottom of the seventh, Judge hit his first home run of the postseason, a two-run shot off Hunter Gaddis to extend the Yankees' lead to 6–2, scoring Torres. In the top of the ninth, José Ramírez hit a home run off closer Luke Weaver to cut the Yankees' lead to 6–3. Weaver then closed out the game for the Yankees to extend their series lead to 2–0 as the series shifted to Cleveland for Game 3.

=== Game 3 ===
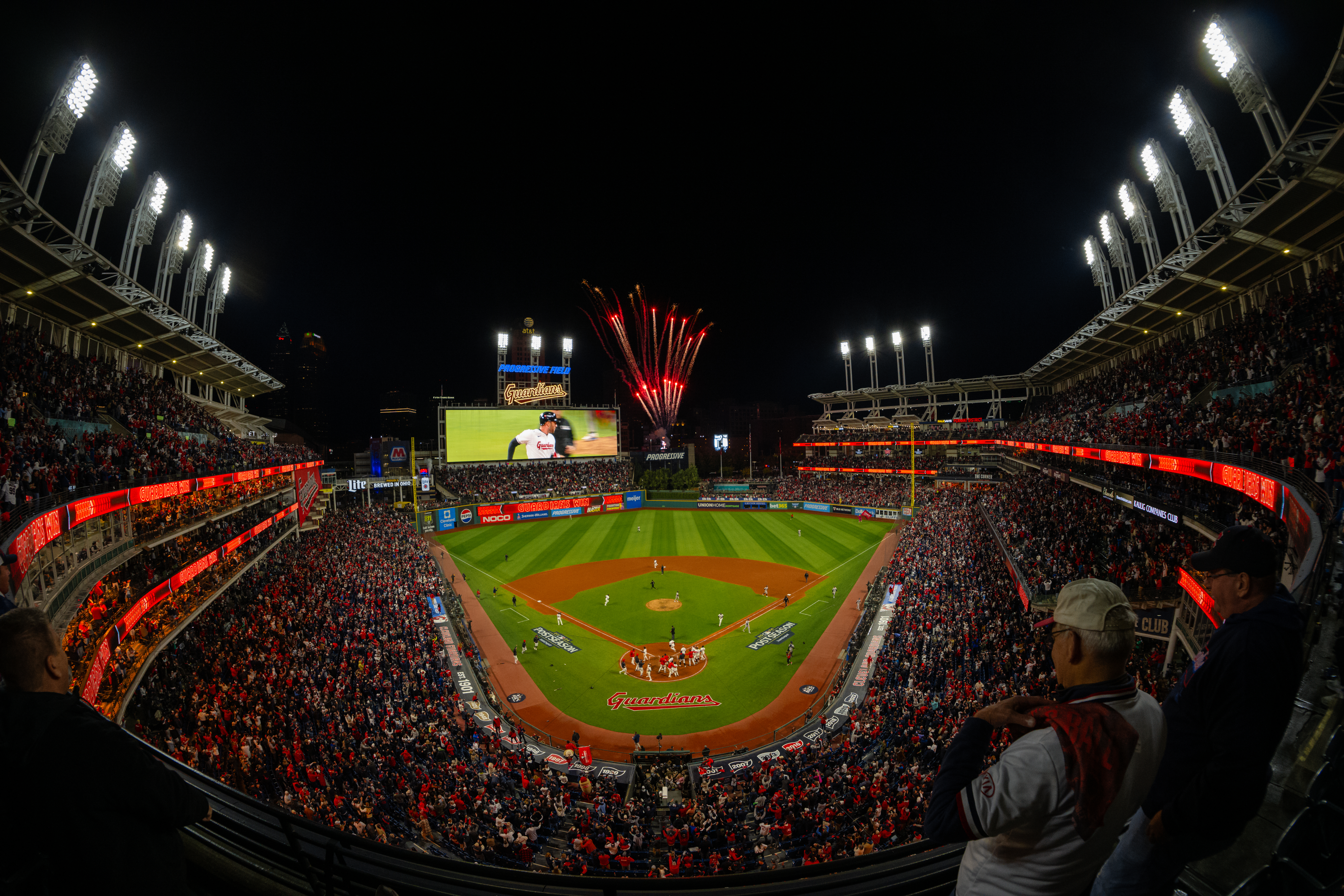
David Fry rounds second base as teammates gather at home plate following a walk-off 2-run home run in Game 3.

October 17, 2024 5:08 pm (EDT) at Progressive Field in Cleveland, Ohio 57 °F (14 °C), Clear
Team	1	2	3	4	5	6	7	8	9	10	R	H	E
New York	0	1	0	0	0	0	0	3	1	0	5	6	1
Cleveland	0	0	2	0	0	1	0	0	2	2	7	11	1
WP: Pedro Ávila (1–0) LP: Clay Holmes (1–1); Home runs: NYY: Aaron Judge (2), Giancarlo Stanton (2); CLE: Kyle Manzardo (1), Jhonkensy Noel (1), David Fry (1); Attendance: 32,531; Boxscore

Game 3 featured starting pitchers Clarke Schmidt for the Yankees and Matthew Boyd for the Guardians. In the top of the second, Jose Trevino hit an RBI single, scoring Anthony Volpe to put the Yankees on the board for a 1–0 lead. In the bottom of the third, Kyle Manzardo hit a two-run home run off Schmidt to turn the game upside down as the Guardians took the lead at 2–1. That home run was also Manzardo's first career postseason home run. In the bottom of the sixth, Andrés Giménez hit an RBI single, scoring Lane Thomas to extend the Guardians' lead to 3–1. With the Yankees top of the order coming up in the Eighth, the Guardians brought in closer Emmanuel Clase. However, Clase would surrender a game-tying blast to Judge, followed by another home run from Stanton, giving the Yankees the lead at 4–3. In the top of the ninth, Gleyber Torres hit a sacrifice fly, scoring Volpe to extend the Yankees' lead to 5–3.

In the bottom of the ninth, the Yankees once again leaned on Weaver to close out the game. He got Josh Naylor to ground into a double play, putting the Yankees one out away from closing out Game 3. The Yankees were one strike away from winning the game when the next batter, Lane Thomas, hit a double off the left field wall to keep Cleveland alive. Jhonkensy Noel then hit a clutch two-run home run off Weaver to tie the game at 5–5 and send the game into extra innings. In the bottom of the 10th, David Fry hit a two-out walk-off two-run home run off Clay Holmes to end the game with a 7–5 victory for the Guardians. Fry's blast was the first postseason walk-off home run for Cleveland since 2022 ALWC Game 2 against the Tampa Bay Rays by Oscar González.

=== Game 4 ===
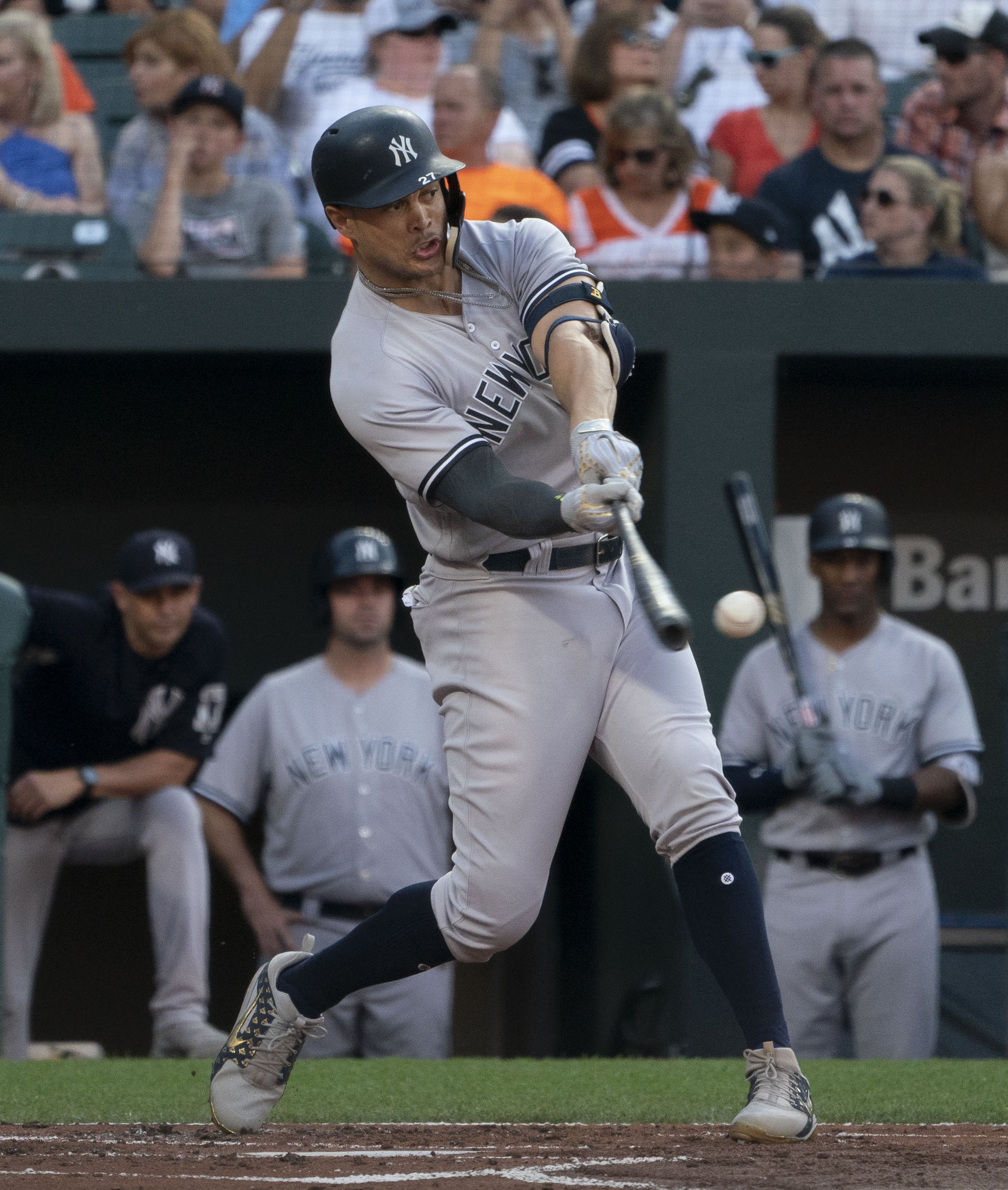
Giancarlo Stanton hit a 3-run home run in the top of the 6th inning; he would eventually go on to be named the ALCS MVP.

October 18, 2024 8:08 pm (EDT) at Progressive Field in Cleveland, Ohio 56 °F (13 °C), Clear
Team	1	2	3	4	5	6	7	8	9	R	H	E
New York	2	1	0	0	0	3	0	0	2	8	10	1
Cleveland	1	0	1	0	0	0	3	1	0	6	11	1
WP: Mark Leiter Jr. (1–0) LP: Emmanuel Clase (0–1) Sv: Tommy Kahnle (1); Home runs: NYY: Juan Soto (2), Austin Wells (1), Giancarlo Stanton (3); CLE: None; Attendance: 35,263; Boxscore

Game 4 featured starting pitchers Gavin Williams for the Guardians and Luis Gil for the Yankees. In the top of the first, Juan Soto hit a two-run home run off Williams to put the Yankees on the board with an early lead of 2–0. In the bottom of the first, José Ramírez hit a sacrifice fly, scoring Steven Kwan to cut the Yankees' lead at 2–1. In the top of the second, Austin Wells hit a solo home run off Williams to give the Yankees a 3–1 lead. In the bottom of the third, Josh Naylor hit an RBI single, scoring Kwan to cut the Yankees' lead at 3–2. In the top of the sixth, Giancarlo Stanton hit a three-run home run off Cade Smith, scoring Soto and Aaron Judge to give the Yankees a 6–2 lead. In the bottom of the seventh, Ramírez hit an RBI double, followed by a two-run RBI double by Naylor to narrow the Guardians' deficit to 6–5. In the bottom of the eighth, David Fry hit an RBI single to score Bo Naylor and tie the game at 6–6. In the top of the ninth, the Yankees retook the lead 7–6 with Alex Verdugo reaching first base on a fielding error by Brayan Rocchio to score Jon Berti. Gleyber Torres then hit an RBI single to score Anthony Volpe, further extending the Yankees' lead to 8–6. Tommy Kahnle closed out the game for the Yankees to take a 3–1 series lead, putting them one win away from their first World Series appearance since 2009.

=== Game 5 ===
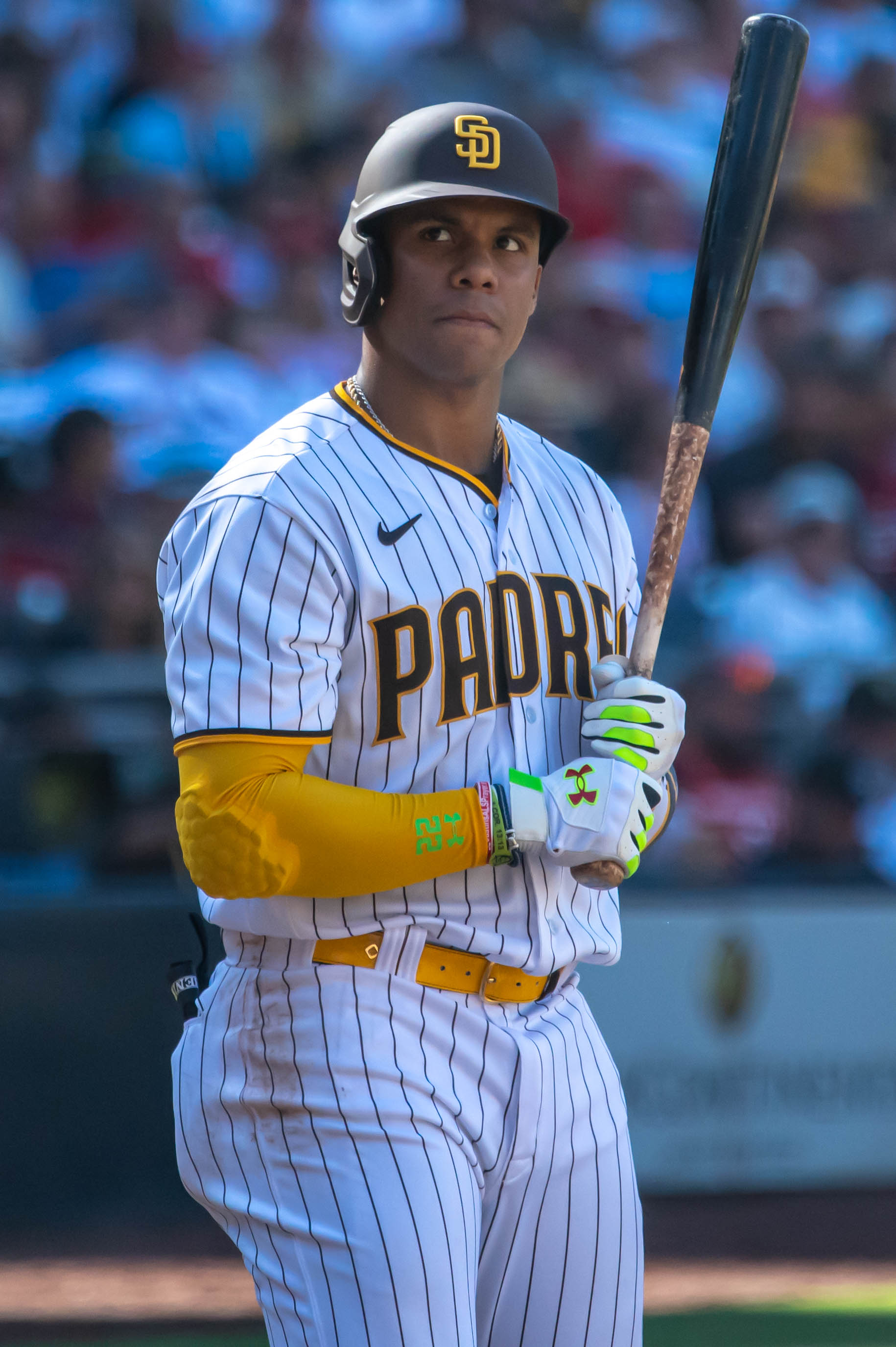
Juan Soto (pictured here with the San Diego Padres) hit a go-ahead 3-run home run in the top of the 10th inning.

October 19, 2024 8:08 pm (EDT) at Progressive Field in Cleveland, Ohio 58 °F (14 °C), Clear
Team	1	2	3	4	5	6	7	8	9	10	R	H	E
New York	0	0	0	0	0	2	0	0	0	3	5	9	0
Cleveland	0	1	0	0	1	0	0	0	0	0	2	7	1
WP: Luke Weaver (1–0) LP: Hunter Gaddis (0–1); Home runs: NYY: Giancarlo Stanton (4), Juan Soto (3); CLE: None; Attendance: 32,545; Boxscore

Game 5 featured starting pitchers Tanner Bibee for the Guardians and Carlos Rodón for the Yankees. In the top of the first, Bibee escaped a bases-loaded jam without surrendering a run by getting Anthony Rizzo to fly out. In the bottom of the second, Bo Naylor hit an RBI double, scoring Josh Naylor to put the Guardians on the board with a score of 1–0. In the bottom of the fifth, Steven Kwan hit an RBI single, scoring Andrés Giménez to extend the lead to 2–0. In the top of the sixth, Bibee got in a bit of trouble, with Torres and Soto reaching base to start the inning. However, Judge proceeded to ground into a double play and it looked like the Guardians were going to escape the inning. But after initially going down in the count 0-2, Giancarlo Stanton worked a full count before smashing a hanging slider into left center, chasing Bibee from the game and tying the game at 2–2. The game would then drag on. In the bottom of the ninth, Luke Weaver threw a 1–2–3 inning to send the game into extra innings for the second time in the series. Disaster would then strike for Cleveland in the top of the tenth, where Austin Wells drew a one-out walk and Verdugo proceeded to reach base when Rocchio mishandled a potential double-play ball, his third error of the series. With two outs, Juan Soto, after an intense at-bat, hit a three-run home run off Hunter Gaddis, giving the Yankees a crushing 5-2 lead. Weaver then closed out the game in the bottom of the inning to clinch the Yankees' 41st pennant and send them to the World Series for the first time since 2009. With the loss, the Guardians extended their championship drought to 76 seasons dating back to 1948.

Yankees hitter Giancarlo Stanton hit four home runs, drove in seven runs, and scored five runs during the series, earning him the AL Championship Series Most Valuable Player Award.

=== Composite line score ===
2024 ALCS (4–1): New York Yankees beat Cleveland Guardians

Team	1	2	3	4	5	6	7	8	9	10	R	H	E
Cleveland Guardians	1	1	3	0	3	2	3	2	3	2	20	43	5
New York Yankees	3	4	3	1	0	6	3	3	3	3	29	42	3
Total attendance: 194,657 Average attendance: 38,931

== Aftermath ==
The Yankees could not recover after losing Game 1 of the World Series on a Freddie Freeman walk-off grand slam home run, going down in the series 3–0, before salvaging a game, but losing in five games to the Los Angeles Dodgers. In the off-season, Juan Soto, the man whose home run got the Yankees to the World Series, left the team for their Subway Series rival, the New York Mets.

Emmanuel Clase experienced a difficult 2024 ALCS against the Yankees, blowing saves in back-to-back games (Game 3 and Game 4), a stark contrast to his dominant regular season. On July 28, 2025, Clase, along with teammate Luis Ortiz (who did not appear in the 2024 ALCS), were placed on non-disciplinary paid leave as part of an investigation by MLB into sports betting. Prosecutors identified 15 times from 2023 through 2025 in which they alleged Clase tried to throw pitches to help sports gamblers win their prop bets on him. It also was later revealed in his indictment that Clase engaged in the illegal sports gambling scheme during the 2024 postseason.

== See also ==
- 2024 National League Championship Series
- Guardians–Yankees rivalry
- Curse of Rocky Colavito
