= St. Joan of Arc Catholic Secondary School =

Location
- 3801 Thomas St; Mississauga, Ontario, L5M 7G2; Canada; 43°33′09.4″N 79°44′47.7″W

Information
- School type: Catholic High School
- Motto: Courage to Believe
- Religious affiliation: Roman Catholic
- Founded: 2004
- School board: Dufferin-Peel Catholic District School Board
- Superintendent: Esther O'Toole
- Area trustee: B. Corbet
- Principal: Samuel Macaluso
- Chaplain: S. Smalridge
- Grades: 9 to 12
- Language: English
- Area: Mississauga North
- Colours: Black and gold
- Mascot: Angel
- Team name: Arc Angels
- Website: www.dpcdsb.org/JOANA

St. Joan of Arc Catholic Secondary School is a school administered by the Dufferin-Peel Catholic District School Board, located in the neighbourhood of Churchill Meadows, Mississauga, Ontario, Canada (Wards 8 and 10). Churchill Meadows Branch of the Mississauga Library System is attached to the school, which shares its facilities.

== School History ==
St. Joan of Arc Catholic Secondary School opened its doors on an off-site location to 134 Grade 9 Students from Churchill Meadows community on September 7, 2004. Clara Pitoscia was the founding Principal and with a staff of twelve teachers, the Chaplaincy leader, and three secretaries the school community began to establish its foundation. St. Joan of Arc was the third high school in Mississauga to be built in partnership with the City of Mississauga sharing a public library facility and community area. In January 2007, two and half years after the school was founded, the students and staff moved into the permanent site at 3801 Thomas Street.

== Feeder Schools ==
- St. Bernard of Clairvaux Catholic Elementary School
- St. Faustina Catholic Elementary School
- St. Sebastian Catholic Elementary School

== Notable alumni ==
- Josh Naylor, first baseman for the MLB's Seattle Mariners (Class of 2015)
- Bo Naylor, catcher for the MLB's Cleveland Guardians (Class of 2018)
- Myles Naylor, third baseman, drafted by the MLB's Oakland Athletics in the 2023 Major League Baseball draft (Class of 2023)
- Tani Oluwaseyi, a forward for Minnesota United FC of Major League Soccer. Born in Nigeria, Oluwaseyi is eligible to represent both Nigeria and Canada internationally.

== See also ==
- Education in Ontario
- List of secondary schools in Ontario
- Churchill Meadows

== Controversy ==
- A small group of staff members at a high school in Mississauga briefly refused to work on Tuesday, March 17, 2020, saying they were initially provided masks that did not meet Health Canada standards.
