= Donna Smellie =

Canadian athlete (born 1960)

Personal information
- Born: 2 September 1964 (age 61) Mississauga, Ontario, Canada

Sport
- Sport: Athletics
- Event: Heptathlon

Donna Smellie (born 2 September 1964) is a Canadian athlete. She competed in the women's heptathlon at the 1984 Summer Olympics.

== Personal life ==
Born in Canada, Smellie is of Jamaican descent. Her brother Kevin Smellie played in the Canadian Football League. Her son Denzel Clarke is a professional baseball outfielder for the Athletics of Major League Baseball (MLB).
