= Alex Clemmey =

American baseball player (born 2005)

Washington Nationals
- Pitcher
- Born: July 18, 2005 (age 21); Fall River, Massachusetts, U.S.
- Bats: Left Throws: Left

Alexander Clemmey (born July 18, 2005) is an American professional baseball pitcher in the Washington Nationals organization.

== Amateur career ==
Clemmey grew up in Middletown, Rhode Island and attended Bishop Hendricken High School in Warwick, Rhode Island. A 6-foot-6 left-handed pitcher, Clemmey won the Rhode Island Gatorade Player of the Year in his senior year of high school, after compiling a 6-1 record with a 0.59 ERA. He committed to play college baseball at Vanderbilt.

== Professional career ==
=== Cleveland Guardians ===
Clemmey was selected by the Cleveland Guardians in the second round, with the 58th overall selection, of the 2023 Major League Baseball draft. On July 22, 2023, Clemmey signed with Cleveland for an above slot deal worth $2.3 million.

Clemmey made his professional debut in 2024 with the Single–A Lynchburg Hillcats, recording a 4.67 ERA with 97 strikeouts in 69 1/3 innings pitched across 19 starts.

=== Washington Nationals ===
On July 29, 2024, the Guardians traded Clemmey, José Tena, and Rafael Ramírez Jr. to the Washington Nationals in exchange for Lane Thomas.
