= Lane Thomas =

American baseball player (born 1995)

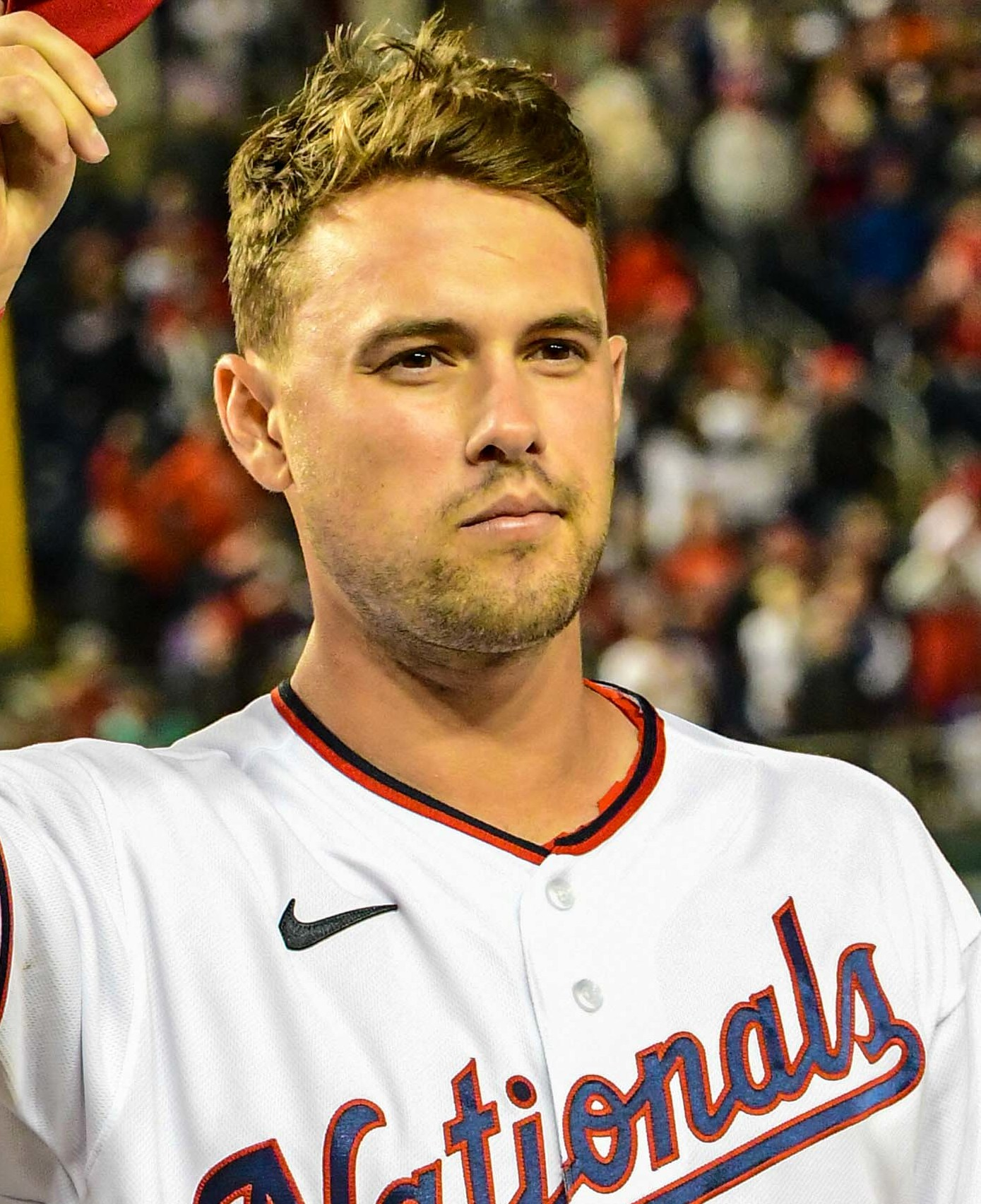
- Thomas with the Nationals in 2022

Free agent
- Outfielder
- Born: August 23, 1995 (age 31); Knoxville, Tennessee, U.S.
- Bats: Right Throws: Right

MLB debut
- April 17, 2019, for the St. Louis Cardinals

MLB statistics (through 2026 season)
- Batting average: .239
- Home runs: 87
- Runs batted in: 294
- Stats at Baseball Reference

Teams
- St. Louis Cardinals (2019–2021); Washington Nationals (2021–2024); Cleveland Guardians (2024–2025); Kansas City Royals (2026); Atlanta Braves (2026)
Medals
Men's baseball
Representing United States
18U Baseball World Cup
Gold medal – first place	2013 Taichung	Team

Lane Michael Thomas (born August 23, 1995) is an American professional baseball outfielder who is a free agent. He has played in Major League Baseball (MLB) for the St. Louis Cardinals, Washington Nationals, Cleveland Guardians, Kansas City Royals, and Atlanta Braves.

The Toronto Blue Jays selected Thomas in the 2014 MLB draft. He played in their minor league system for four years before he was traded to the Cardinals in 2017. He made his MLB debut with the team in 2019, but struggled with injuries and was unable to find consistent playing time. During the 2021 season, he was traded to the Nationals, where he became their starting center fielder. The Nationals traded him to the Guardians in 2024. Thomas signed with the Royals as a free agent prior to the 2026 season.

== Amateur career ==
Thomas attended Bearden High School in Knoxville, Tennessee. As a sophomore, he committed to play college baseball at the University of Tennessee. During the summer of 2013, he played for Team USA in the 2013 18U Baseball World Cup in Taichung. In 2014, as a senior, he batted .410 with 17 home runs and 40 RBIs. Following his senior year, he was drafted by the Toronto Blue Jays in the fifth round of the 2014 Major League Baseball draft.

== Professional career ==
=== Toronto Blue Jays ===
Thomas signed with the Blue Jays for $750,000, forgoing his college commitment.

Thomas made his professional debut that same year with the Gulf Coast League Blue Jays before being reassigned to the Bluefield Blue Jays. In 52 games between the two clubs, he batted .281 with one home run and 19 RBIs. In 2015, he played for both the Vancouver Canadians and the Lansing Lugnuts, hitting a combined .206 with five home runs and 35 RBIs in 52 total games. He spent 2016 with Lansing where he compiled a .216 batting average with seven home runs, 27 RBIs, and 17 stolen bases in 81 games. He began 2017 with the Dunedin Blue Jays.

=== St. Louis Cardinals ===
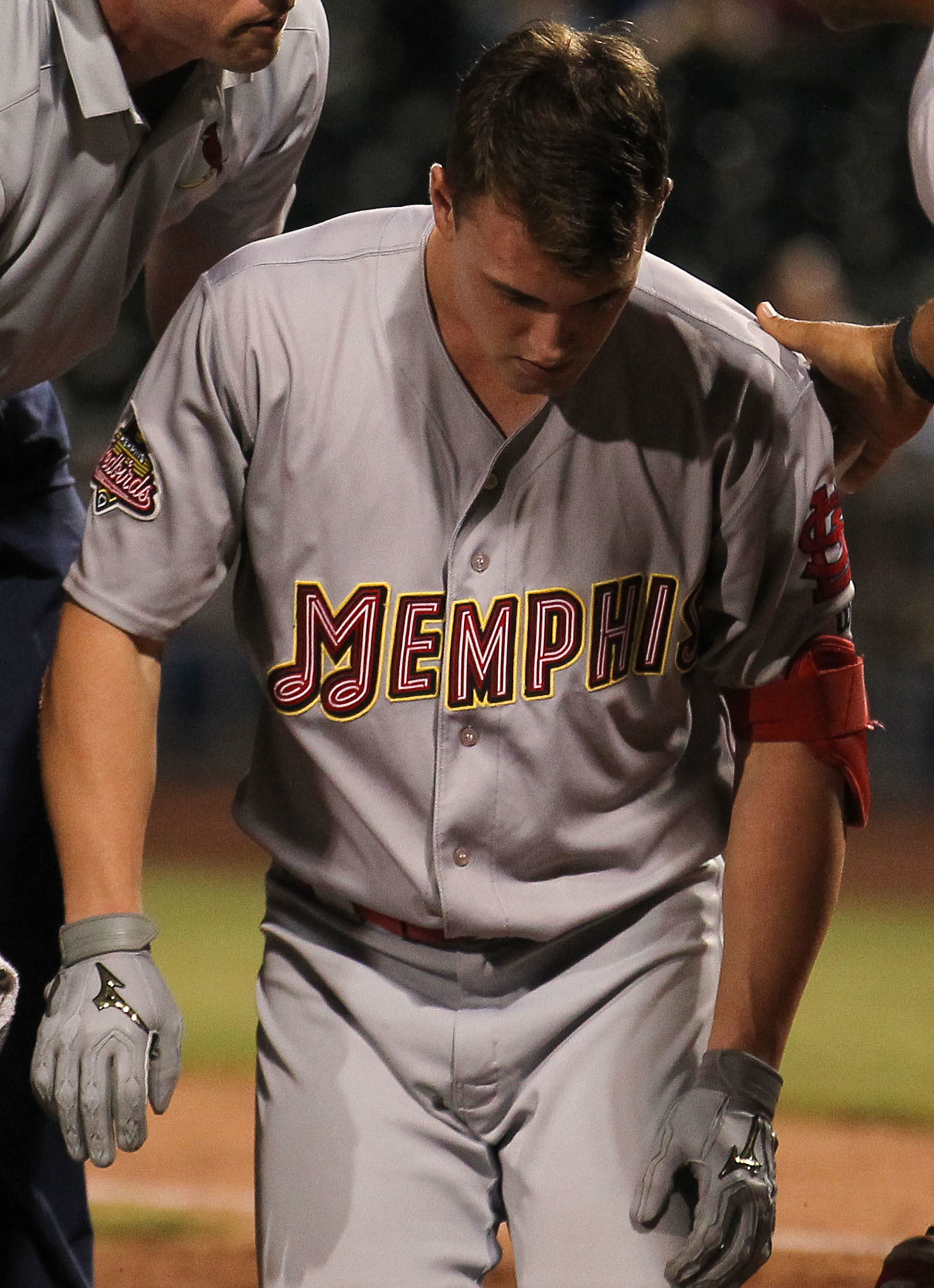
Thomas with the Memphis Redbirds in 2019

On July 2, 2017, Toronto traded Thomas to the St. Louis Cardinals in exchange for international signing bonus cap space. St. Louis assigned him to the Palm Beach Cardinals, but he played in only nine games due to injury. In 82 total games between Dunedin and Palm Beach, he hit .252 with four home runs and 41 RBIs. Thomas began the 2018 season with the Springfield Cardinals where he was named a Texas League All-Star. He was promoted to the Memphis Redbirds in late July and finished the season there, helping the Redbirds win the 2018 Triple-A National Championship Game. In 132 games between Springfield and Memphis, Thomas slashed .264/.333/.489 with 27 home runs, 88 RBIs, and 17 stolen bases. He was assigned to play for the Surprise Saguaros of the Arizona Fall League after the season.

The Cardinals added Thomas to their 40-man roster after the 2018 season. He returned to Memphis to begin 2019. On April 17, he was recalled to the major leagues for the first time and he made his major league debut that same day at Miller Park against the Milwaukee Brewers. On April 19, against the New York Mets at Busch Stadium, he hit a home run in his first major league at bat. On August 11, Thomas hit his first ever major league grand slam. On August 30, he was placed on the 10-day injured list after being hit in his right wrist. On September 1, he was transferred to the 60-day injured list, effectively ending his season. Over 44 plate appearances with St. Louis, he hit .316 with four home runs.

Thomas began the 2020 season with St. Louis. On August 9, it was announced he had tested positive for COVID-19. He returned to play in October, and ended the season batting .111 with one home run over 18 games. In 2021, Thomas did not make the Opening Day roster. He split time between Memphis and St. Louis during the 2021 season before being traded, batting .104 in 58 plate appearances with the big league team.

=== Washington Nationals ===
On July 30, 2021, Thomas was traded to the Washington Nationals in exchange for starting pitcher Jon Lester. Thomas was called up in August 2021 and soon became the Nationals' everyday center fielder, supplanting Victor Robles. Over 45 games with Washington, Thomas slashed .270/.364/.489 with seven home runs and 27 RBIs.

On June 3, 2022, Thomas enjoyed his first career three-home run game in a contest against the Cincinnati Reds. In 2022 with the Nationals, he played in 146 games, led the majors in percentage of balls hit safely (23.2%), and batted .241/.301/.404 with 17 home runs, 52 RBIs, and 26 doubles.

On January 13, 2023, Thomas agreed to a one-year, $2.2 million contract with the Nationals, avoiding salary arbitration.

In 2023, Thomas became the Nationals' primary right fielder and enjoyed a breakout season, batting .268 and setting career highs with 28 home runs and 20 stolen bases.

On January 11, 2024, Thomas and the Nationals agreed to a one-year contract worth $5.45 million to avoid salary arbitration. In 77 games prior to being traded, Thomas hit .253/.331/.407 with 8 home runs and 40 RBIs.

=== Cleveland Guardians ===
On July 29, 2024, Thomas was traded to the Cleveland Guardians in exchange for Alex Clemmey, José Tena, and Rafael Ramírez Jr. He struggled mightily after the trade, but bounced back to have some memorable postseason moments. In 53 regular season games with Cleveland, Thomas hit .209/.267/.390 with 7 home runs and 23 RBI. On October 12, in the deciding fifth game of the American League Division Series against the Detroit Tigers, Thomas hit his second home run of the series, a grand slam off Tarik Skubal in the bottom of the fifth inning, giving the Guardians a 5–1 lead. They held on for a 7-3 win, which advanced the team to the ALCS, Cleveland's first appearance in a championship series since 2016. In 10 playoff games, Thomas hit .222 with two home runs and nine RBI as the Guardians made it to ALCS.

Thomas made 39 appearances for Cleveland during the 2025 campaign, batting .160/.246/.272 with four home runs, 11 RBI, and four stolen bases. On September 23, 2025, it was announced that Thomas had undergone season-ending surgery to address plantar fasciitis.

After the season ended, on November 2, Thomas elected free agency.

=== Kansas City Royals ===
On December 17, 2025, Thomas signed a one-year, $5.25 million contract with the Kansas City Royals. Thomas made 97 appearances for Kansas City during the 2026 season, batting .232/.326/.393 with 10 home runs, 37 RBI, and seven stolen bases.

=== Atlanta Braves ===
On August 1, 2026, the Royals traded Thomas to the Atlanta Braves, along with Bailey Falter, in exchange for Lucas Braun and Carter Holton. He played in 21 games for Atlanta and batted .171 with one home run and three RBI. He missed time in September after being placed on the injured list with a strained intercostal muscle. Thomas was activated and returned to play in the 2026 National League Division Series.

== Personal life ==
Growing up, Thomas's favorite athlete was Todd Helton, who also hails from Knoxville.

Thomas co-owns Knox Cabinet Co., a home remodeling business, with his sister, alongside another co-owner.

Thomas's wife is Chase Henry, who he married on January 21, 2023, in Panama City Beach, Florida. On October 30, 2023, their son Henry was born.

== See also ==
- List of Major League Baseball players with a home run in their first major league at bat
