= 2024 American League Division Series =

Teams
Team (Wins)		Manager	Season
New York Yankees (3)		Aaron Boone	94–68 (.580), GA: 3
Kansas City Royals (1)		Matt Quatraro	86–76 (.531), GB: 6 1/2
- Dates: October 5–10
- Television: TBS/TruTV; Max
- TV announcers: Bob Costas, Ron Darling, and Jon Morosi
- Radio: ESPN
- Radio announcers: Karl Ravech, Eduardo Pérez, and Tim Kurkjian
- Umpires: Lance Barksdale, Lance Barrett, Ryan Blakney, Mark Carlson (crew chief), Adam Hamari, Roberto Ortiz

Teams
Team (Wins)		Manager	Season
Cleveland Guardians (3)		Stephen Vogt	92–69 (.571), GA: 6 1/2
Detroit Tigers (2)		A. J. Hinch	86–76 (.531), GB: 6 1/2
- Dates: October 5–12
- Television: TBS/TruTV (Games 1–3, 5); TNT (Game 4); Max
- TV announcers: Brian Anderson, Jeff Francoeur, and Lauren Jbara
- Radio: ESPN
- Radio announcers: Dave O'Brien and Gregg Olson
- Umpires: Adam Beck, Ramon De Jesus, Chad Fairchild, Nick Mahrley, Todd Tichenor (crew chief), Jim Wolf
- ALWC: Detroit Tigers over Houston Astros (2–0); Kansas City Royals over Baltimore Orioles (2–0)

The 2024 American League Division Series (ALDS) were the two best-of-five playoff series in Major League Baseball's (MLB) 2024 postseason to determine the participating teams of the 2024 American League Championship Series (ALCS). These matchups were:

- (1) New York Yankees (AL East champions) vs. (5) Kansas City Royals (Wild Card Series winner): Yankees won the series, 3–1.
- (2) Cleveland Guardians (AL Central champions) vs. (6) Detroit Tigers (Wild Card Series winner): Guardians won the series, 3–2.

The team with the better regular season record (higher seed) of each series hosted Games 1 and 2, and in Cleveland's case, hosted Game 5. The lower seeded team hosted Games 3 and 4.

The Yankees would go on to defeat the Guardians in the American League Championship Series (ALCS) by 4 games to 1, but would lose the 2024 World Series, 4 games to 1, to the Los Angeles Dodgers.

== Background ==
The top two division winners (first two seeds) were determined by regular season winning percentages. The final two teams were the winners of the American League (AL) Wild Card Series, played between the league's third to sixth-seeded teams. This was the first AL Division Series since 2016 to not feature the Houston Astros after they were swept in the Wild Card Series by the Tigers.

The New York Yankees (94–68) clinched a postseason berth on September 18, won both the AL East and earned a first-round bye on September 26, and clinched home-field advantage throughout the AL postseason on September 28 after the Guardians lost to the Houston Astros. This was first time they held the best record in the league since 2012. The Yankees, who had made the postseason six straight years from 2017 to 2022, returned to the postseason after missing out in 2023. They played the Kansas City Royals (86–76), who qualified for the postseason as the fifth seed wild card entrant due to their head-to-head record versus the Detroit Tigers, the team they finished tied with. The Royals swept the Baltimore Orioles in the Wild Card Series to advance to their first ALDS since 2015, the year they won the World Series. New York won the season series, 5–2, outscoring Kansas City 42–24. This was a renewal of a classic playoff rivalry from the late 1970s to the early 1980s, as both teams met in the AL Championship Series for four out of the five seasons (1976, 1977, 1978, and 1980), with New York winning the first three, and Kansas City sweeping New York in 1980. New York won the first game of the 2024 ALDS 6–5; the game featured six lead changes, more than any game in playoff history.

The Cleveland Guardians (92–69) clinched a postseason berth on September 19, won the American League Central on September 21, and clinched a first-round bye on September 24. Like the Yankees, the Guardians made their return to the postseason after missing out in 2023. They played the Detroit Tigers (86–76), who qualified for the postseason as the sixth seed wild card entrant. They swept the AL West division winner Houston Astros in two games in the Wild Card Series to advance to their first ALDS since 2014. The Guardians won 7–6 against the Tigers during the regular season. This was the first playoff meeting between the Tigers and Guardians. This was also the first postseason matchup between AL Central teams. (Note: Kansas City vs Detroit Tigers in 1984 and Minnesota Twins vs Detroit Tigers in 1987 playoff series happened before the creation of the American League Central Division.)

== Matchups ==
=== New York Yankees vs. Kansas City Royals ===
New York won the series, 3–1.

Game	Date	Score	Location	Time	Attendance
1	October 5	Kansas City Royals – 5, New York Yankees – 6	Yankee Stadium	3:21	48,790
2	October 7	Kansas City Royals – 4, New York Yankees – 2	Yankee Stadium	3:07	48,034
3	October 9	New York Yankees – 3, Kansas City Royals – 2	Kauffman Stadium	3:06	40,312
4	October 10	New York Yankees – 3, Kansas City Royals – 1	Kauffman Stadium	2:36	39,012

=== Cleveland Guardians vs. Detroit Tigers ===
Cleveland won the series, 3–2.

Game	Date	Score	Location	Time	Attendance
1	October 5	Detroit Tigers – 0, Cleveland Guardians – 7	Progressive Field	2:50	33,548
2	October 7	Detroit Tigers – 3, Cleveland Guardians – 0	Progressive Field	2:42	33,650
3	October 9	Cleveland Guardians – 0, Detroit Tigers – 3	Comerica Park	2:43	44,885
4	October 10	Cleveland Guardians – 5, Detroit Tigers – 4	Comerica Park	3:05	44,923
5	October 12	Detroit Tigers – 3, Cleveland Guardians – 7	Progressive Field	3:08	34,105

== New York vs. Kansas City ==
This was the fifth postseason meeting between the New York Yankees and the Kansas City Royals. Their previous postseason meetings between the former rivals took place in 1976, 1977, 1978, and 1980, all in the ALCS, with the Yankees winning the first three matchups (winning in 1976 and 1977 on their last at bat) and the Royals winning in 1980. After 1980, the rivalry continued in 1983 with the Pine Tar Game, which was one of the most controversial incidents in MLB history.

=== Game 1 ===
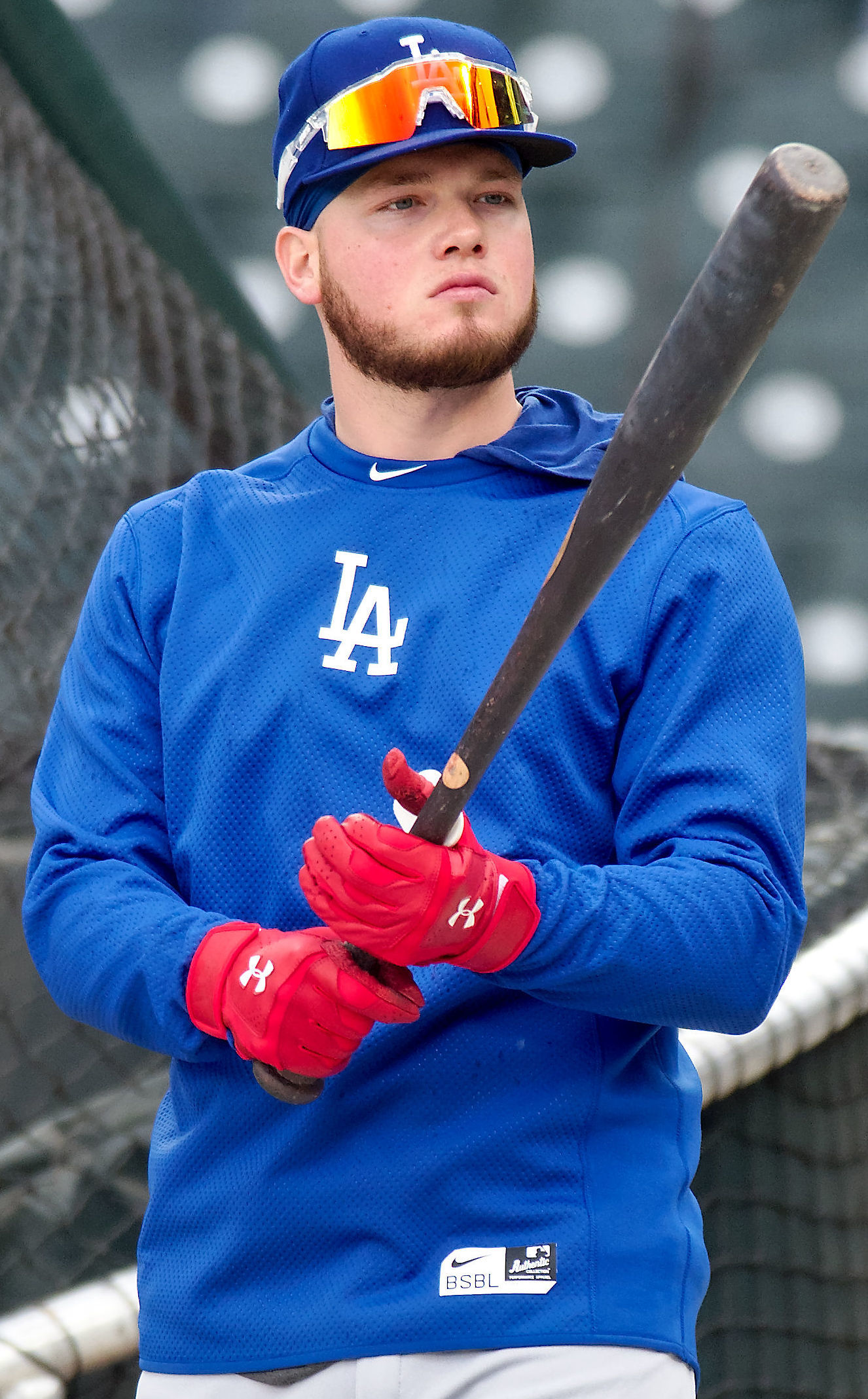
Alex Verdugo, pictured here with the Los Angeles Dodgers, drove in the game-winning run in Game 1, which was the fifth lead change of the game.

October 5, 2024 6:38 pm (EDT) at Yankee Stadium in The Bronx, New York 71 °F (22 °C), Clear
Team	1	2	3	4	5	6	7	8	9	R	H	E
Kansas City	0	1	0	2	0	2	0	0	0	5	9	0
New York	0	0	2	0	2	1	1	0	X	6	9	1
WP: Clay Holmes (1–0) LP: Michael Lorenzen (0–1) Sv: Luke Weaver (1); Home runs: KC: MJ Melendez (1); NYY: Gleyber Torres (1); Attendance: 48,790; Boxscore

In the first postseason meeting between the two teams since the 1980 ALCS, the lead changed five times throughout the game, the most ever in MLB postseason history. Gerrit Cole started for the Yankees against Michael Wacha for the Royals. Tommy Pham got the scoring started in the second inning with a sacrifice fly that scored Yuli Gurriel and made it 1-0 Royals. In the bottom of the third, Gleyber Torres hit a go-ahead two-run home run off Michael Wacha to give the Yankees their first lead at 2–1, scoring Alex Verdugo. In the top of the fourth, MJ Melendez hits a go-ahead two-run home run to give the Royals the lead back at 3–2, scoring Gurriel again. In the bottom of the fifth, bases-loaded walks by Austin Wells and Anthony Volpe put the Yankees back in front, 4–3. In the top of the sixth, after a crucial error by Volpe that moved Gurriel and Pham into scoring position, Garrett Hampson hit a two-run RBI single to score both runners and the Royals retook the lead again, 5–4. In the bottom of the sixth, Wells' RBI single scored Verdugo, tying the game at five. In the bottom of the seventh, Verdugo hit an RBI single to score Jazz Chisholm Jr. and the Yankees retook the lead again 6–5, the fifth lead change of the game. Luke Weaver, in his first career postseason appearance, preserved the one-run lead for the Yankees to take a thrilling Game 1.

=== Game 2 ===
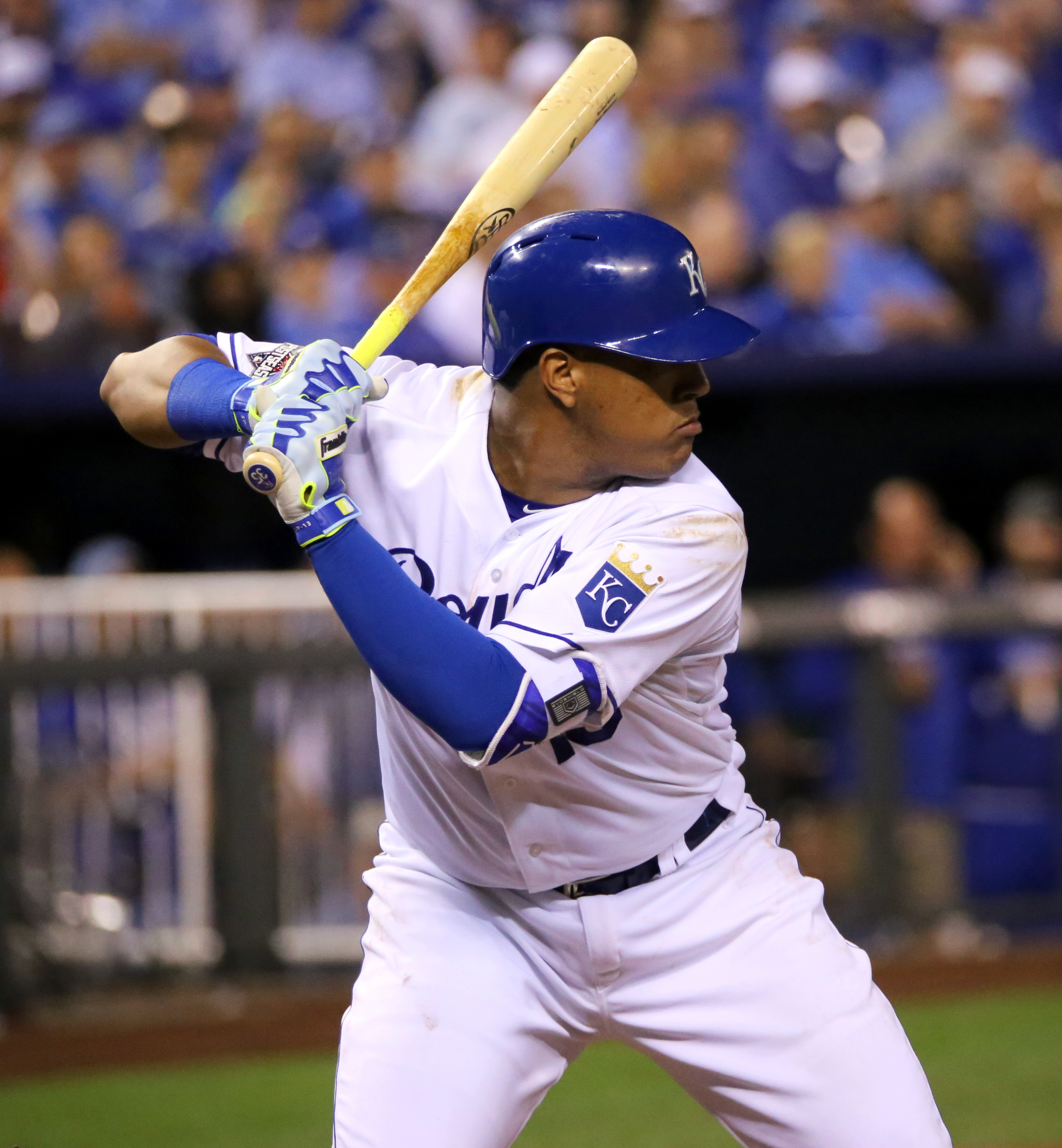
Salvador Perez hit a game-tying home run in Game 2.

October 7, 2024 7:38 pm (EDT) at Yankee Stadium in The Bronx, New York 67 °F (19 °C), Party Cloudy
Team	1	2	3	4	5	6	7	8	9	R	H	E
Kansas City	0	0	0	4	0	0	0	0	0	4	11	0
New York	0	0	1	0	0	0	0	0	1	2	6	1
WP: Ángel Zerpa (1–0) LP: Carlos Rodón (0–1) Sv: Lucas Erceg (1); Home runs: KC: Salvador Pérez (1); NYY: Jazz Chisholm Jr. (1); Attendance: 48,034; Boxscore

Game 2 matched New York's Carlos Rodón against Kansas City's Cole Ragans. The Yankees scored first on Giancarlo Stanton's RBI single that scored Gleyber Torres in the bottom of the third. In the top of the fourth, Salvador Pérez's solo home run tied the game at one. Tommy Pham then hit an RBI single, scoring Yuli Gurriel to give the Royals the lead at 2–1. Garrett Hampson then hit an RBI single, scoring Pham to extend the Royals' lead to 3–1. Maikel García hit another RBI single in the fourth for the Royals to extend their lead to 4–1 over the Yankees. In the bottom of the ninth, Jazz Chisholm Jr. hit a home run off Lucas Erceg to cut the Royals' lead to 4–2, but Erceg managed to get the save and win for the Royals, tying the series at 1–1.

=== Game 3 ===
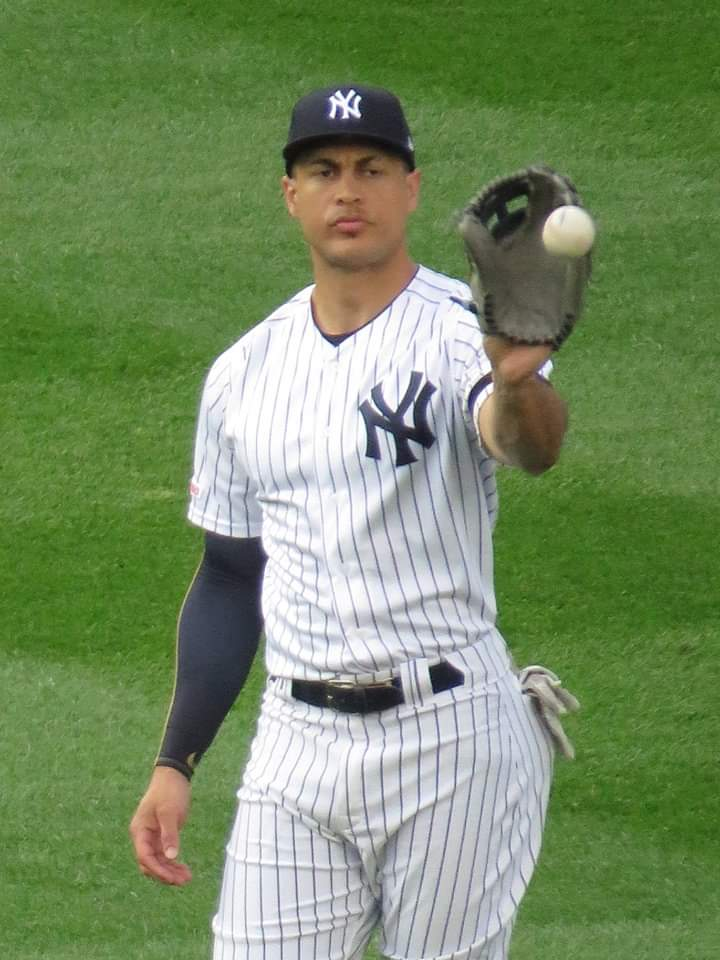
Giancarlo Stanton drove in two of the Yankees' three runs in Game 3.

October 9, 2024 6:08 pm (CDT) at Kauffman Stadium in Kansas City, Missouri 81 °F (27 °C), Clear
Team	1	2	3	4	5	6	7	8	9	R	H	E
New York	0	0	0	1	1	0	0	1	0	3	4	0
Kansas City	0	0	0	0	2	0	0	0	0	2	6	1
WP: Tommy Kahnle (1–0) LP: Kris Bubic (0–1) Sv: Luke Weaver (2); Home runs: NYY: Giancarlo Stanton (1); KC: None; Attendance: 40,312; Boxscore

This was the first postseason game in Kansas City since Game 2 of the 2015 World Series. Seth Lugo started for the Royals while Clarke Schmidt started for the Yankees. In the top of the fourth, Giancarlo Stanton hit an RBI double off Lugo to score Juan Soto, putting the Yankees on the board 1–0. In the top of the fifth, Soto hit a sacrifice fly, scoring Anthony Volpe to extend the Yankees' lead to 2–0. In the bottom of the fifth, Kyle Isbel hit an RBI double, followed by an RBI triple from Michael Massey to tie the game at 2–2. In the top of the eighth, Stanton hit a home run off Kris Bubic to put the Yankees back in the lead at 3–2. Luke Weaver closed the game with a five-out save preserving a one-run lead as the Yankees took a 2–1 series lead.

=== Game 4 ===
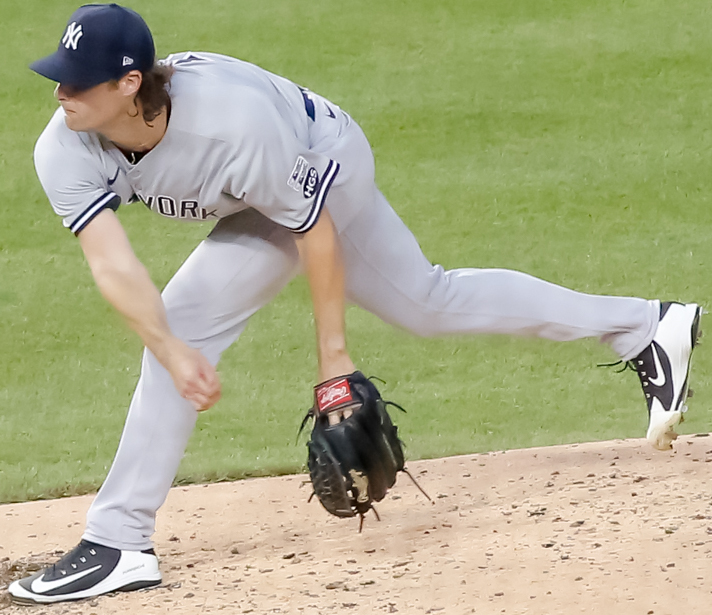
Gerrit Cole pitched 7 strong innings and earned the win in Game 4.

October 10, 2024 7:08 pm (CDT) at Kauffman Stadium in Kansas City, Missouri 78 °F (26 °C), Clear
Team	1	2	3	4	5	6	7	8	9	R	H	E
New York	1	0	0	0	1	1	0	0	0	3	8	0
Kansas City	0	0	0	0	0	1	0	0	0	1	6	0
WP: Gerrit Cole (1–0) LP: Michael Wacha (0–1) Sv: Luke Weaver (3); Attendance: 39,012; Boxscore

Gleyber Torres started Game 4 with a double on Michael Wacha's first pitch, followed by an RBI single from Juan Soto to score Torres and put the Yankees on the board 1–0. In the top of the fifth, Torres hit an RBI single, scoring Alex Verdugo to extend the Yankees' lead to 2–0. In the top of the sixth, Giancarlo Stanton hit an RBI single, scoring Aaron Judge as an insurance run to extend the Yankees' lead to 3–0. In the bottom of the sixth, the benches were cleared for an on-field delay for a brief amount of time when Maikel García was tagged out sliding to second base on a 3–6 double play by Anthony Volpe. Vinnie Pasquantino then hit an RBI double off Gerrit Cole to score Bobby Witt Jr., cutting the Yankees' lead to 3–1. Luke Weaver closed out the game and series with a perfect ninth for his third save of the series, sending the Yankees to their fourth ALCS appearance in eight years.

The Yankees' series win ended closer Will Smith's unlikely streak of three consecutive World Series wins with three separate teams (the Atlanta Braves in 2021, the Astros in 2022, and the Texas Rangers the previous year).

=== Composite line score ===
2024 ALDS (3–1): New York Yankees beat Kansas City Royals

Team	1	2	3	4	5	6	7	8	9	R	H	E
Kansas City Royals	0	1	0	6	2	3	0	0	0	12	32	1
New York Yankees	1	0	3	1	4	2	1	1	1	14	27	2
Total attendance: 176,148 Average attendance: 44,037

== Cleveland vs. Detroit ==
This was the first postseason meeting between the Cleveland Guardians and the Detroit Tigers.

=== Game 1 ===
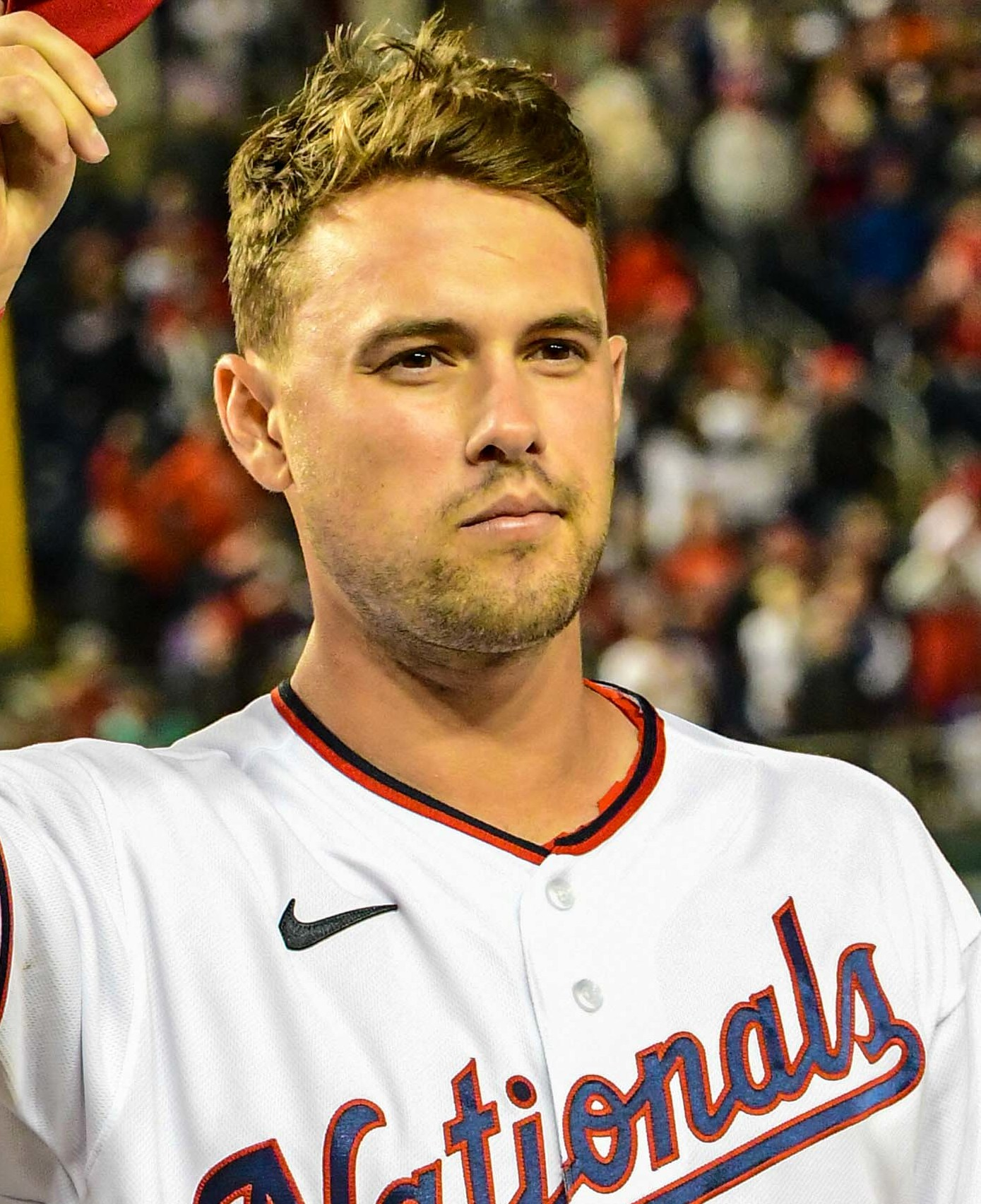
Lane Thomas, pictured here with the Washington Nationals, hit a three-run homer in the bottom of the 1st inning in Game 1.

October 5, 2024 1:08 pm (EDT) at Progressive Field in Cleveland, Ohio 68 °F (20 °C), Sunny
Team	1	2	3	4	5	6	7	8	9	R	H	E
Detroit	0	0	0	0	0	0	0	0	0	0	4	1
Cleveland	5	0	0	0	0	2	0	0	X	7	6	0
WP: Cade Smith (1–0) LP: Tyler Holton (0–1); Home runs: DET: None; CLE: Lane Thomas (1); Attendance: 33,548; Boxscore

Cleveland pounced on Detroit in the first inning of Game 1 as the Guardians plated five runs. The Guardians scored the first run of the game when José Ramírez doubled, scoring Steven Kwan. Josh Naylor's RBI single extended the Guardians' lead to 2–0. At this time, starting Tigers pitcher Tyler Holton was removed from the game without recording a single out. He allowed two hits and four earned runs. Lane Thomas then greeted reliever Reese Olson with a three-run home run that gave the Guardians a 5–0 advantage. In the bottom of the sixth, David Fry hit an RBI double for two more runs to extend the Guardians' lead to 7–0, scoring Jhonkensy Noel and Steven Kwan. Emmanuel Clase closed out the game as the Guardians took Game 1 and a 1–0 series lead.

The Guardians' five-run first inning tied for the most runs in the first inning in franchise playoff history.

=== Game 2 ===
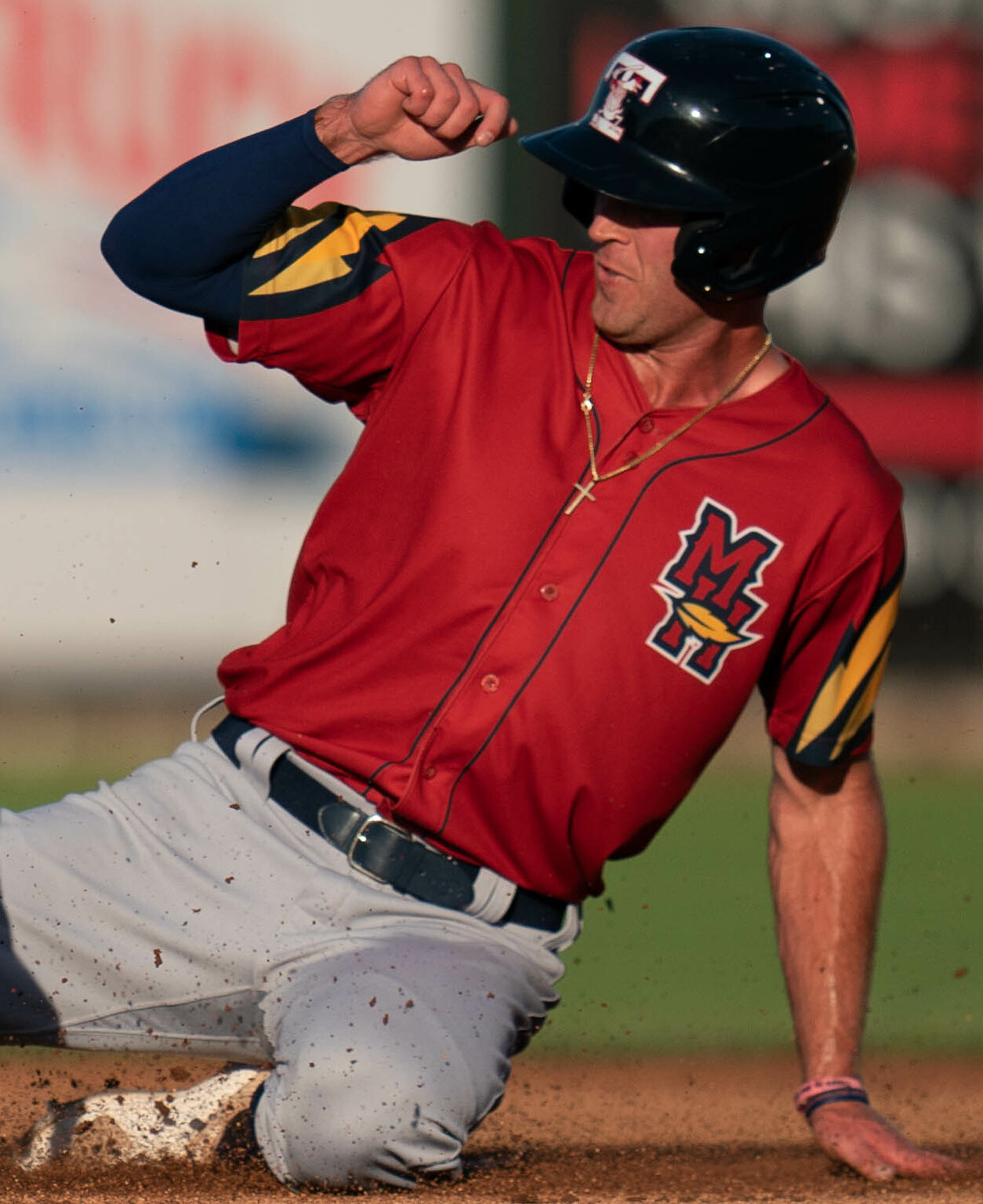
Kerry Carpenter, pictured here with the Toledo Mud Hens, hit a go-ahead three-run homer in the top of the 9th inning in Game 2.

October 7, 2024 4:08 pm (EDT) at Progressive Field in Cleveland, Ohio 61 °F (16 °C), Partly Cloudy
Team	1	2	3	4	5	6	7	8	9	R	H	E
Detroit	0	0	0	0	0	0	0	0	3	3	9	0
Cleveland	0	0	0	0	0	0	0	0	0	0	3	0
WP: Will Vest (1–0) LP: Emmanuel Clase (0–1) Sv: Beau Brieske (1); Home runs: DET: Kerry Carpenter (1); CLE: None; Attendance: 33,650; Boxscore

Game 2 between the Tigers and Guardians went scoreless until the top of the ninth when the Tigers' Kerry Carpenter hit a three-run home run off Guardians closer Emmanuel Clase to break the tie. Beau Brieske closed out the game as the Tigers took Game 2 and evened the series at one game apiece. Tarik Skubal, the starting pitcher for the Tigers, went seven shutout innings while striking out eight in his performance.

=== Game 3 ===
October 9, 2024 3:08 pm (EDT) at Comerica Park in Detroit, Michigan 65 °F (18 °C), Partly Cloudy
Team	1	2	3	4	5	6	7	8	9	R	H	E
Cleveland	0	0	0	0	0	0	0	0	0	0	6	1
Detroit	1	0	1	0	0	1	0	0	X	3	5	1
WP: Brant Hurter (1–0) LP: Alex Cobb (0–1) Sv: Tyler Holton (1); Attendance: 44,885; Boxscore

Alex Cobb made his first postseason start since 2013 for Game 3 against the Tigers. The Tigers scored the first run of Game 3 in the bottom of the first as Riley Greene's RBI single scored Parker Meadows. In the bottom of the third, Matt Vierling increased the Tigers' lead to 2–0 as Vierling hit a sacrifice fly, scoring Jake Rogers. In the bottom of the sixth, Spencer Torkelson hit an RBI double, scoring Colt Keith to extend the Tigers' lead to 3–0. Tyler Holton closed the game as the Tigers took a 2–1 series lead over the Guardians. With this victory, the Tigers shutout the Guardians for two consecutive games in the playoffs.

=== Game 4 ===
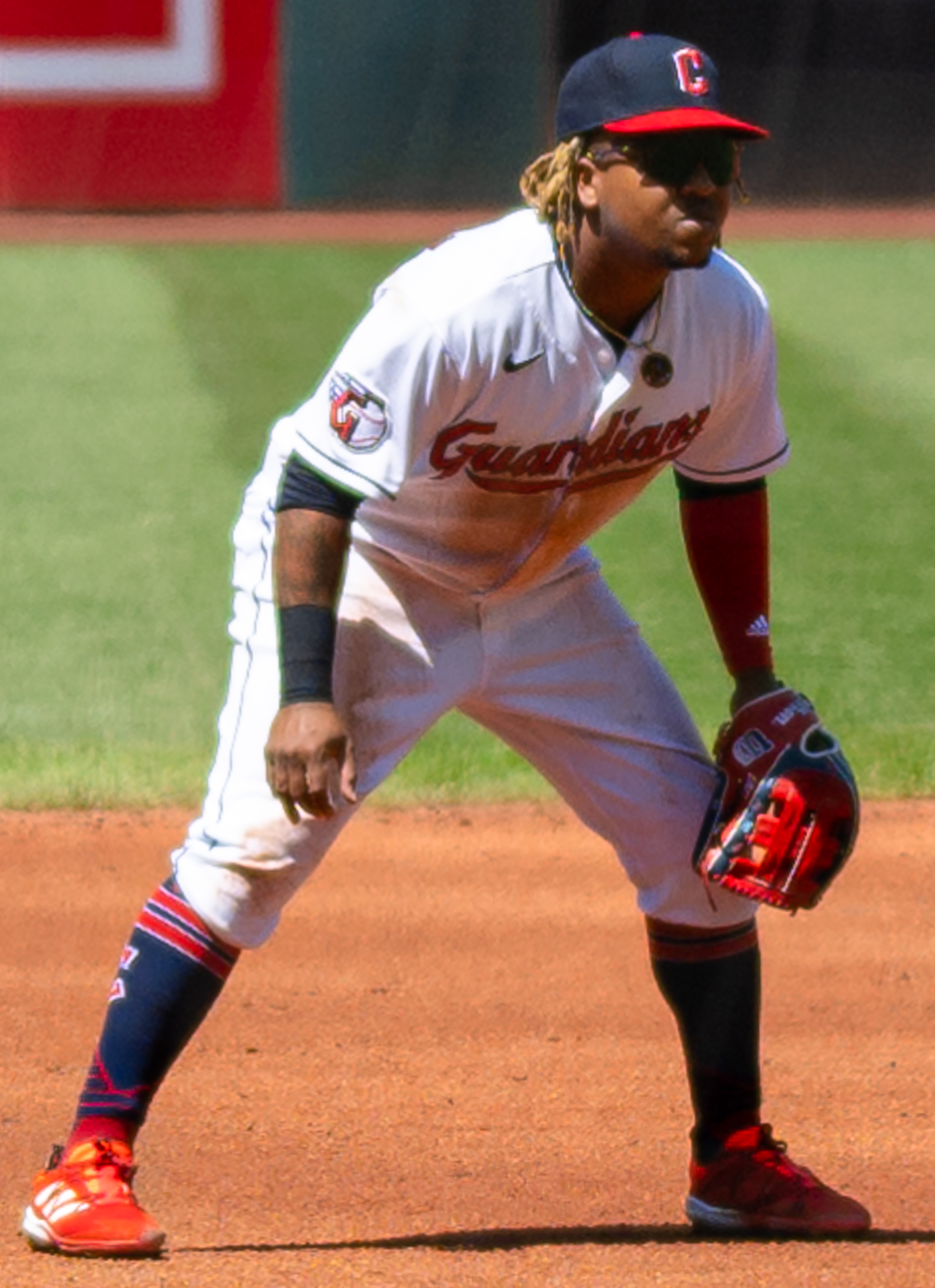
José Ramírez hit a go-ahead home run in Game 4.

October 10, 2024 6:08 pm (EDT) at Comerica Park in Detroit, Michigan 61 °F (16 °C), Clear
Team	1	2	3	4	5	6	7	8	9	R	H	E
Cleveland	1	0	0	0	1	0	2	0	1	5	11	0
Detroit	0	1	0	0	1	1	0	0	1	4	9	0
WP: Hunter Gaddis (1–0) LP: Beau Brieske (0–1) Sv: Emmanuel Clase (1); Home runs: CLE: José Ramírez (1), David Fry (1); DET: Zach McKinstry (1); Attendance: 44,923; Boxscore

Game 4 opened with an RBI single by Lane Thomas to score Steven Kwan in the top of the first, putting the Guardians on the board 1–0. In the bottom of the second, Trey Sweeney hit a sacrifice fly to score Colt Keith, tying the game 1–1. In the top of the fifth, José Ramírez hit a home run off Tyler Holton as the Guardians retook the lead at 2–1. In the bottom of the fifth, Zach McKinstry answered back with a home run off Tanner Bibee to tie the game 2–2. In the bottom of the sixth, Wenceel Pérez hit an RBI single, scoring Riley Greene as the Tigers took the lead at 3–2. In the top of the seventh, David Fry hit a two-run home run off Beau Brieske as the Guardians retook the lead at 4–3. In the top of the ninth, Fry hit a sacrifice bunt for a squeeze play, scoring Brayan Rocchio from third base to extend the Guardians' lead to 5–3. In the bottom of the ninth, Justyn-Henry Malloy scored from third base on a soft RBI groundout by Jace Jung to cut the Guardians' lead to 5–4. Emmanuel Clase closed the door by getting the save as the Guardians tied the series to force a winner-take-all Game 5 back in Cleveland. It was the first elimination game won by Cleveland since Game 6 of the 1997 World Series; since that game, they had lost eleven playoff games where they were facing elimination, an MLB record.

Game 4's attendance of 44,923 was the largest for a postseason game in Comerica Park's history.

=== Game 5 ===
October 12, 2024 1:08 pm (EDT) at Progressive Field in Cleveland, Ohio 65 °F (18 °C), Sunny
Team	1	2	3	4	5	6	7	8	9	R	H	E
Detroit	0	0	0	0	1	1	1	0	0	3	7	1
Cleveland	0	0	0	0	5	0	1	1	X	7	11	0
WP: Tim Herrin (1–0) LP: Tarik Skubal (0–1) Sv: Emmanuel Clase (2); Home runs: DET: None; CLE: Lane Thomas (2); Attendance: 34,105; Boxscore

Game 5 featured a pitching rematch from Game 2 between Matthew Boyd and Tarik Skubal, in which they both were teammates with the Tigers last year. Additionally, the start time of the game was moved from 8:08 p.m. ET to 1:08 p.m. ET to avoid inclement weather in Cleveland. In the bottom of the third, Skubal loaded the bases with two outs by intentionally walking José Ramírez, and got Lane Thomas to pop out to Spencer Torkelson to escape a two-out bases-loaded jam to keep the game scoreless. In the top of the fifth, Kerry Carpenter hit an RBI single off Andrew Walters to score Trey Sweeney from first base after he drew a walk. In the bottom of the fifth, Ramírez was hit by a pitch with the bases loaded by Skubal to put the Guardians on the board and tie the game at one. Lane Thomas then hit a grand slam off Skubal to put the Guardians in the lead at 5–1, scoring Steven Kwan, David Fry, and Ramírez. In the top of the sixth, Jake Rogers hit an RBI single, scoring Spencer Torkelson, cutting the Guardians' lead to 5–2. Hunter Gaddis then escaped a two-out bases-loaded jam to preserve a 5–2 lead for the Guardians. In the top of the seventh, Colt Keith hit an RBI double to score Riley Greene, cutting the Guardians' lead to 5–3. In the bottom of the seventh, Thomas hit an RBI single to score Kwan, extending the Guardians' lead to 6–3. In the bottom of the eighth, Brayan Rocchio hit an RBI single for an insurance run from Andrés Giménez, extending the Guardians' lead to 7–3. Emmanuel Clase closed the game with a six-out save as the Guardians won the series and advanced to the American League Championship Series for the first time since 2016.

=== Composite line score ===
2024 ALDS (3–2): Cleveland Guardians beat Detroit Tigers

Team	1	2	3	4	5	6	7	8	9	R	H	E
Detroit Tigers	1	1	1	0	2	3	1	0	4	13	34	3
Cleveland Guardians	6	0	0	0	6	2	3	1	1	19	37	1
Total attendance: 191,111 Average attendance: 38,222

== See also ==
- 2024 National League Division Series
