= Spencer Torkelson =

American baseball player (born 1999)

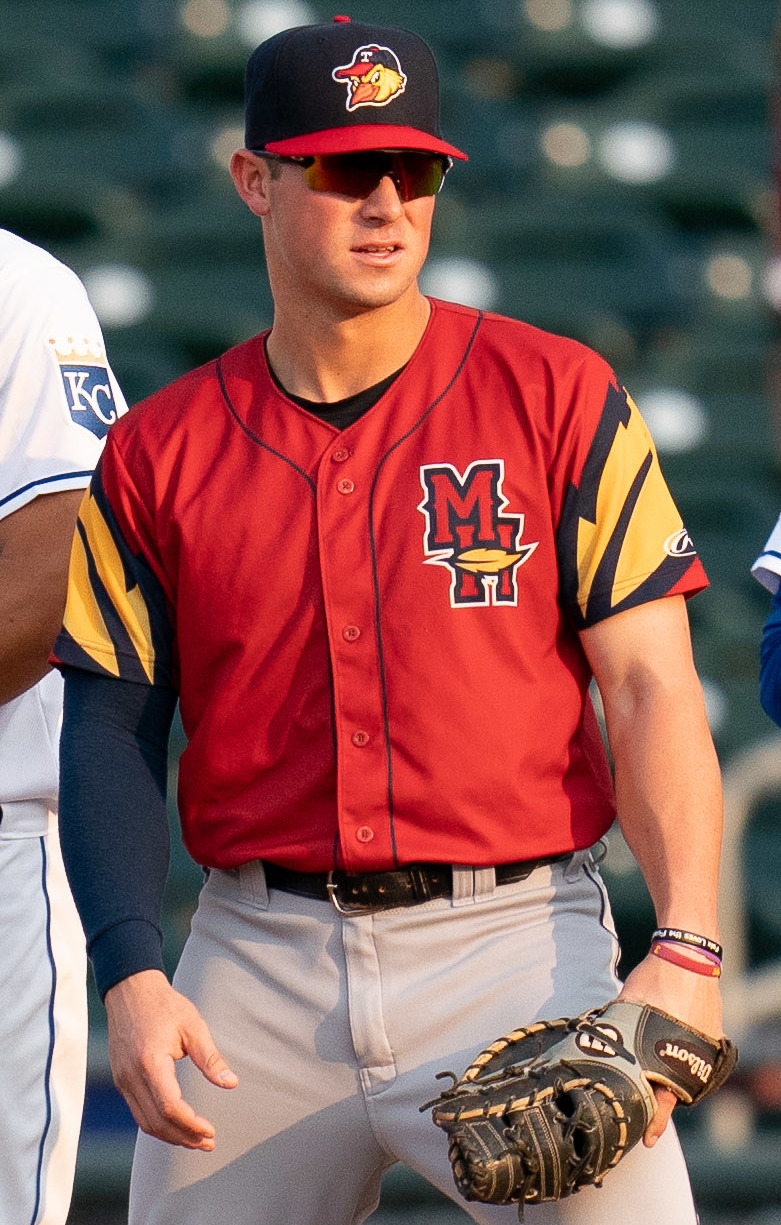
- Torkelson with the Toledo Mud Hens in 2021

Detroit Tigers – No. 20
- First baseman
- Born: August 26, 1999 (age 27); Petaluma, California, U.S.
- Bats: Right Throws: Right

MLB debut
- April 8, 2022, for the Detroit Tigers

MLB statistics (through 2026 season)
- Batting average: .227
- Home runs: 106
- Runs batted in: 314
- Stats at Baseball Reference

Teams
- Detroit Tigers (2022–present)

Spencer Enochs Torkelson (born August 26, 1999) is an American baseball first baseman for the Detroit Tigers of Major League Baseball (MLB). Torkelson was selected first overall by the Tigers in the 2020 Major League Baseball draft.

== Amateur career ==
Torkelson attended Casa Grande High School in Petaluma, California, where he played baseball, football and basketball. During his high school baseball career, he batted .430 with 11 home runs and 99 runs batted in (RBIs). He committed to Arizona State University (ASU) to play college baseball for the Arizona State Sun Devils.

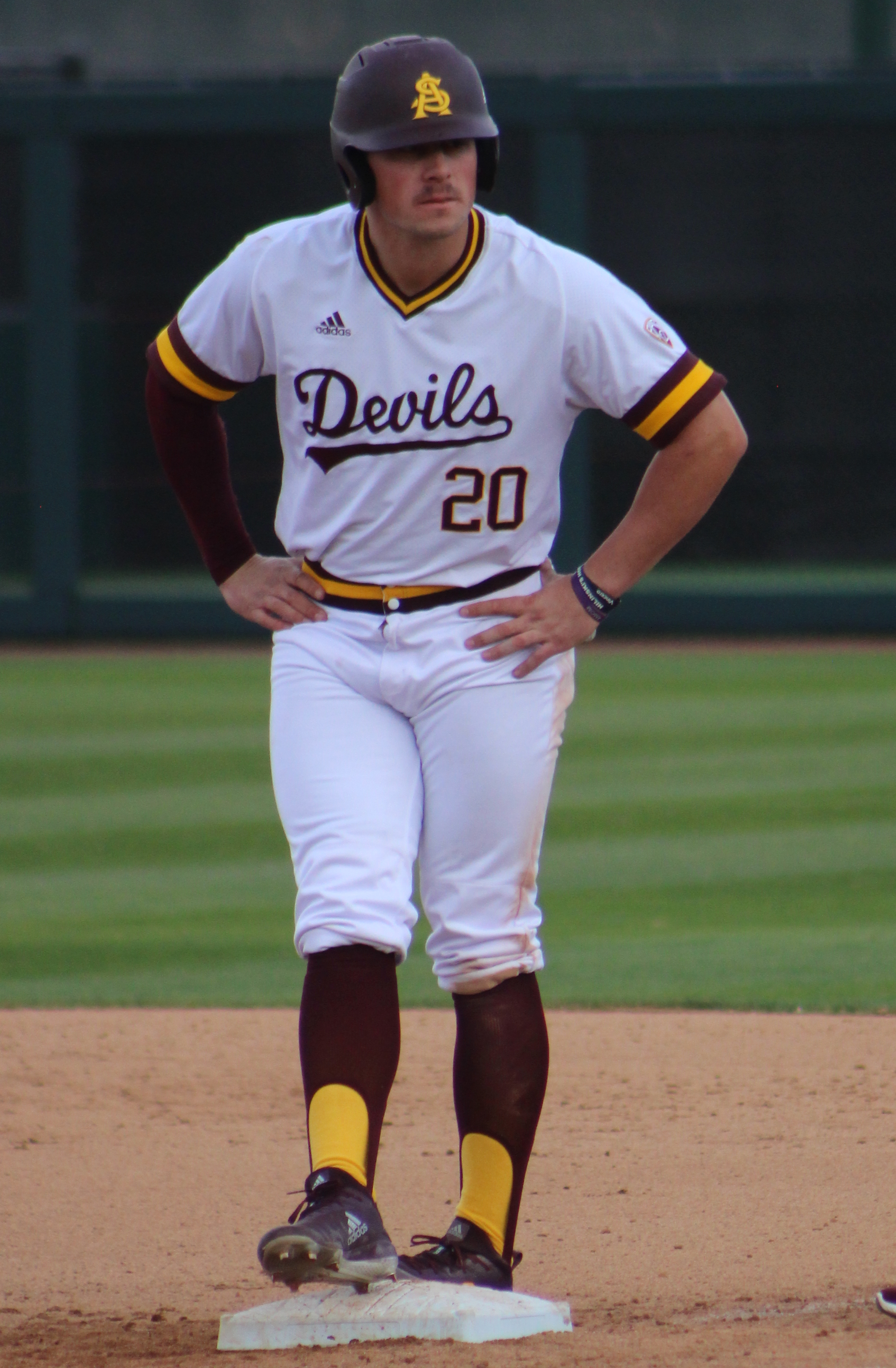
Torkelson with Arizona State in 2019

As a freshman at Arizona State, Torkelson batted .320/.440/.743 with 25 home runs and 53 RBIs over 55 games. The 25 home runs led the nation, set a Pac-12 Conference record for home runs by a freshman, and also broke Barry Bonds' school record for home runs by a freshman. He was named the Collegiate Baseball Newspaper Freshman of the Year, National Collegiate Baseball Writers Association National Freshman Hitter of the Year and the Pac-12 Freshman of the Year. After the season, he played for the United States collegiate national team. As a sophomore, Torkelson joined Bob Horner as the only Arizona State players to hit 20 home runs for consecutive seasons. In 2019, Baseball America ranked Torkelson as the No. 1 college prospect in the 2020 draft. After the 2018 and 2019 seasons, he played collegiate summer baseball for the Chatham Anglers of the Cape Cod Baseball League. As a junior, Torkelson hit six home runs in a COVID-19 shortened season, giving him 53 for his ASU career, three shy of ASU's career record.

== Professional career ==
=== Minor leagues ===
The Detroit Tigers selected Torkelson with the first overall pick in the 2020 Major League Baseball draft. On June 30, 2020, he signed with the Tigers for $8,416,300, at that time the highest signing bonus in MLB draft history. The same day, he was added to the Tigers' 60-man player pool.

To begin the 2021 season, Torkelson was assigned to the West Michigan Whitecaps of the High-A Central. After slashing .312/.440/.569 with five home runs and 28 RBIs over 31 games, he was promoted to the Erie SeaWolves of the Double-A Northeast in mid-June. That same month, he was selected to play in the All-Star Futures Game. Over fifty games with Erie, he batted .263 with 14 home runs and 36 RBIs. On August 15, he was promoted to the Toledo Mud Hens of Triple-A East, where finished the season and hit .238/.350/.481 with 11 home runs and 27 RBIs over 40 games. After the Triple-A season ended, he joined the Salt River Rafters of the Arizona Fall League.

=== Detroit Tigers ===
On April 2, 2022, the Tigers announced that Torkelson had made their Opening Day roster. His first major league hit was a double off Boston Red Sox pitcher Rich Hill on April 12. He hit his first major league home run off Red Sox pitcher Austin Davis on April 13. On July 17, the Tigers optioned Torkelson to Triple-A Toledo. At the time of the demotion, he was hitting .199 with 5 home runs. Torkelson returned to the Tigers as a September call-up, and finished the 2022 season with a batting average of .203, with 8 home runs.

In the 2023 season, Torkelson hit .233 while leading the Tigers in home runs (31), RBI (94) and extra-base hits (66). He became the seventh Tigers player to hit 20 or more home runs in his age-23 season, joining Travis Fryman, Hank Greenberg, Willie Horton, Matt Nokes, Jason Thompson and Rudy York. He is the first Tiger to hit 30 homers since Miguel Cabrera and Justin Upton both reached the mark in 2016. Also, on July 18, 2023, at Kansas City he became the first Tigers player age 23-or-younger to have three or more extra-base hits and 10 or more total bases in a game since Nick Castellanos on August 19, 2015, at Chicago (NL).

After struggling for the first two months of the 2024 season, Torkelson was again optioned to Triple-A Toledo on June 3. At the time of the demotion, he was hitting .201 with 4 home runs. He was recalled August 17, and finished the 2024 season hitting .219 with 10 home runs and 37 RBI in 92 games.

The Tigers ended up clinching a Wild Card spot with Torkelson as Detroit's starting first baseman. Torkelson started the postseason 0-14 at the plate with nine strikeouts and three walks. On October 9, in Game 3 of the 2024 American League Division Series against the Cleveland Guardians, Torkelson recorded his first postseason hit — an RBI double in the sixth inning to put the Tigers up 3-0. That proved to be the final score, as Detroit took a 2-1 lead in the series.

For the 2025 season, Torkelson batted .240 with 78 RBI, while matching his career high with 31 home runs. He went 6-for-33 (.182) in the 2025 postseason, with 3 doubles and 6 RBI.

On January 6, 2026, the Tigers and Torkelson agreed on a one-year, $4.075 million contract, avoiding arbitration. From April 22 to April 26 of the 2026 season, Torkelson hit a home run in five consecutive games, tying a franchise record held by five others, most recently accomplished by Marcus Thames in 2008. On July 29, Torkelson recorded his 500th career hit and later hit his 100th career home run, a game-tying two-run home run in the 11th inning off Baltimore Orioles pitcher Rico Garcia, during an extra-inning loss. He finished the game 2-for-5 with two RBIs. For the season, Torkelson hit .230 with 26 home runs and 77 RBI. His 194 strikeouts were the second-most for a season in Tigers history, behind only the 201 strikeouts recorded by Riley Greene in 2025.
