= José Tena (baseball) =

Dominican baseball player (born 2001)

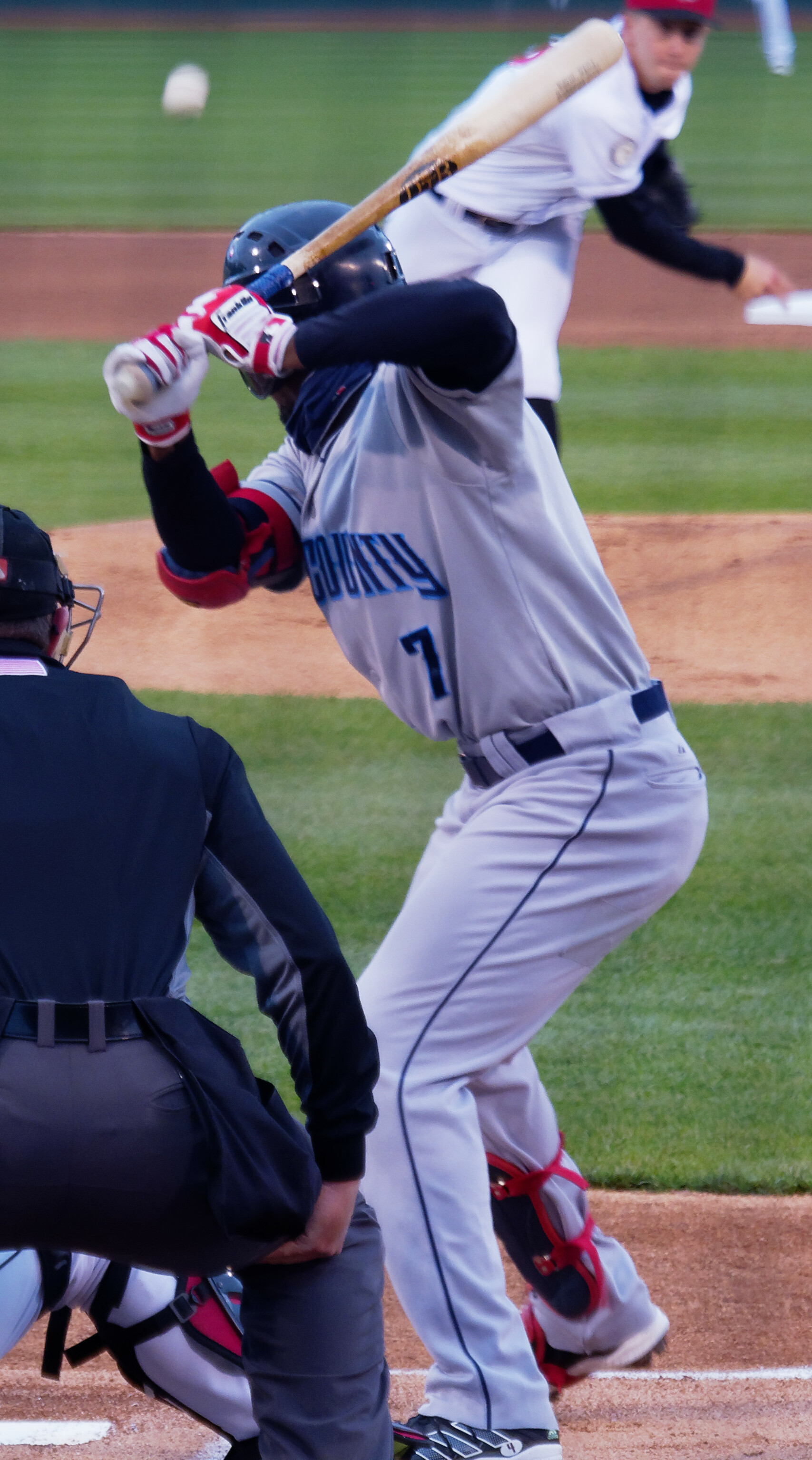
- Tena with the Lake County Captains in 2021

Cleveland Guardians
- Infielder / Designated hitter
- Born: March 20, 2001 (age 25); San Cristóbal, Dominican Republic
- Bats: Left Throws: Right

MLB debut
- August 5, 2023, for the Cleveland Guardians

MLB statistics (through 2026 season)
- Batting average: .240
- Home runs: 10
- Runs batted in: 59
- Stats at Baseball Reference

Teams
- Cleveland Guardians (2023–2024); Washington Nationals (2024–2026)

José Luis Tena (born March 20, 2001) is a Dominican professional baseball infielder and designated hitter for the Cleveland Guardians of Major League Baseball (MLB). He has previously played in Major League Baseball (MLB) for the Washington Nationals.

== Career ==
=== Cleveland Indians / Guardians ===
Tena signed with the Cleveland Indians as an international free agent on July 2, 2017. He made his professional debut in 2018 with the Dominican Summer League Indians, batting .313 with one home run and 23 runs batted in over 51 games. He spent the 2019 season with the rookie–level Arizona League Indians where he hit .325 with one home run and 18 runs batted in over 44 games. Tena did not play in a game in 2020 due to the cancellation of the minor league season because of the COVID-19 pandemic.

Tena spent the 2021 season with the Lake County Captains, slashing .281/.331/.467 with 16 home runs and 58 runs batted in over 107 games. After the season, he played in the Arizona Fall League for the Scottsdale Scorpions where he won the batting title with a .387 average over 17 games. On November 19, 2021, Cleveland added Tena to their 40-man roster to protect him from the Rule 5 draft. He split the 2022 campaign between the Double–A Akron RubberDucks and Triple–A Columbus Clippers, slashing a combined .267/.306/.419 with 14 home runs, 68 RBI, and eight stolen bases across 132 games.

Tena was optioned to Triple–A Columbus to begin the 2023 season. On August 4, 2023, Tena was promoted to the major leagues for the first time. On August 10, he registered his first major league hit, an RBI single against Alek Manoah of the Toronto Blue Jays. In 18 games during his rookie campaign, Tena went 7–for–31 (.226) with 3 RBI.

Tena was optioned to Triple–A Columbus to begin the 2024 season. In three games for Cleveland in 2024, he went 0–for–4.

=== Washington Nationals ===
On July 29, 2024, Tena, along with minor leaguers Alex Clemmey and Rafael Ramírez Jr., were traded to the Washington Nationals in exchange for Lane Thomas. In 41 games for the Nationals down the stretch, he hit .274/.305/.363 with three home runs, 15 RBI, and six stolen bases.

Tena made 114 appearances for Washington during the 2026 campaign, batting .222/.302/.370 with seven home runs, 25 RBI, and six stolen bases. On November 2, 2026, Tena was designated for assignment by the Nationals.

=== Cleveland Guardians (second stint) ===
On November 6, 2026, Tena was claimed off waivers by the Cleveland Guardians.
