= New York Yankees =

Major League Baseball franchise

- 2026 New York Yankees season

Logo	Cap insignia
- Established in 1903

Major league affiliations
- American League (1903–present); East Division (1969–present)

Current uniform
- Retired numbers: 1; 2; 3; 4; 5; 6; 7; 8; 8; 9; 10; 15; 16; 20; 21; 23; 32; 37; 42; 44; 46; 49; 51; 52; 42

Colors
- Midnight navy blue, white

Name
- New York Yankees (1913–present); New York Highlanders (1903–1912)

Nicknames
- The Bronx Bombers; The Yanks; The Pinstripers; The Evil Empire

Ballpark
- Yankee Stadium (II) (2009–present); Shea Stadium (1974–1975); Yankee Stadium (I) (1923–1973, 1976–2008); Polo Grounds (IV) (1913–1922); Hilltop Park (1903–1912)

Major league titles
- World Series titles (27): 1923; 1927; 1928; 1932; 1936; 1937; 1938; 1939; 1941; 1943; 1947; 1949; 1950; 1951; 1952; 1953; 1956; 1958; 1961; 1962; 1977; 1978; 1996; 1998; 1999; 2000; 2009
- AL pennants (41): 1921; 1922; 1923; 1926; 1927; 1928; 1932; 1936; 1937; 1938; 1939; 1941; 1942; 1943; 1947; 1949; 1950; 1951; 1952; 1953; 1955; 1956; 1957; 1958; 1960; 1961; 1962; 1963; 1964; 1976; 1977; 1978; 1981; 1996; 1998; 1999; 2000; 2001; 2003; 2009; 2024
- AL East division titles (21): 1976; 1977; 1978; 1980; 1981; 1996; 1998; 1999; 2000; 2001; 2002; 2003; 2004; 2005; 2006; 2009; 2011; 2012; 2019; 2022; 2024
- Wild card berths (11): 1995; 1997; 2007; 2010; 2015; 2017; 2018; 2020; 2021; 2025; 2026

Front office
- Principal owners: Yankee Global Enterprises (Hal Steinbrenner, chairman)
- President: Randy Levine
- General manager: Brian Cashman
- Manager: Aaron Boone
- Website: mlb.com/yankees

The New York Yankees are an American professional baseball team based in the New York City borough of the Bronx. The Yankees compete in Major League Baseball as a member club of the American League (AL) East Division. They are one of two MLB clubs based in New York City, along with the New York Mets of the National League. The team was founded in 1903 when Frank Farrell and Bill Devery purchased the franchise rights to the defunct Baltimore Orioles (Note: No relation to the current Orioles) and used them to establish the New York Highlanders. (Note: Although the history of the New York Yankees can be traced back to the 1901–1902 Baltimore Orioles, the Orioles team is considered a separate team by Baseball-Reference.com, official Major League Baseball historian John Thorn, and the official Yankees history.) The Highlanders were renamed the Yankees in 1913.

The team is owned by Yankee Global Enterprises, a limited liability company that is controlled by the family of the late George Steinbrenner. Steinbrenner purchased the team from CBS in 1973. As of 2025, Brian Cashman is the team's general manager, Aaron Boone is the team's field manager, and Aaron Judge is the team captain. The team's home games were played at the original Yankee Stadium in the Bronx from 1923 to 1973 and from 1976 to 2008. In 1974 and 1975, the Yankees shared Shea Stadium with the Mets, the New York Jets, and the New York Giants. In 2009, they moved into a new Yankee Stadium, built next to the old one, which was demolished. The team is perennially among the leaders in MLB attendance.

Arguably the most successful professional sports franchise in the United States, the Yankees have won 21 American League East Division titles, 41 American League pennants, and 27 World Series championships, all of which are Major League Baseball records. The team has won more titles than any other franchise in the major North American sports leagues. The Yankees have had 52 players and 11 managers inducted into the National Baseball Hall of Fame, including iconic figures of the sport such as Babe Ruth, Lou Gehrig, Joe DiMaggio, Mickey Mantle, Yogi Berra, Whitey Ford, and Reggie Jackson; more recent inductees include Mariano Rivera and Derek Jeter, who received the highest vote percentages of any Hall of Fame member. According to Forbes, the Yankees are the tenth-most valuable sports franchise in the world and the most valuable MLB franchise, with an estimated value of $8.2 billion in 2025. The team has garnered enormous popularity and a dedicated fanbase, as well as widespread enmity from fans of other MLB teams. The team's rivalry with the Boston Red Sox is one of the best-known in North American sports. The team's logo is internationally known as a fashion item and an icon of New York City and the United States.

From 1903 to the 2025 season, the Yankees' win–loss record is 10,872–8,216–88 (a .569 winning percentage).

== History ==
=== 1901–1902: Origins in Baltimore ===
In 1900, Ban Johnson, the president of a minor league known as the Western League (1894–1899), changed the Western League name to the American League (AL) and asked the National League to classify it as a major league. Johnson held that his league would operate on friendly terms with the National League, but the National League demanded concessions which Johnson did not agree with and he declared major league status for the AL in 1901 anyway.

Plans to add an AL team in New York City were blocked by the NL's New York Giants. A team was instead placed in Baltimore, Maryland, in 1901 and named the Orioles. The Orioles were managed by John McGraw, who was also a part-owner. After many personal clashes with Johnson, during the 1902 season McGraw moved to become the new manager of the Giants, taking many players with him. The Orioles limped through the remainder of the season under league control, using a roster of players loaned from the rest of the AL clubs. The Orioles were disbanded at the end of the season.

In early 1903, the two leagues decided to settle their disputes and try to coexist. At a conference, Johnson requested that an AL team be put in New York, to play alongside the NL's Giants. It was put to a vote, and 15 of the 16 major league owners agreed on it. The franchise was awarded to Frank J. Farrell and William S. Devery. It is not clear whether Farrell and Devery purchased the remains of the Orioles and moved them to New York, or if they received an expansion franchise. Baseball-Reference.com included the 1901 and 1902 Orioles in its statistics for the Yankees until 2014, when it decided to separate the two years from the subsequent New York-based seasons. Official MLB historian John Thorn supported the change, citing the new ownership, high roster turnover, and AL takeover of the Orioles. The Yankees do not count the Orioles years as part of their history.

=== 1903–1912: Establishment in New York and the Highlanders years ===
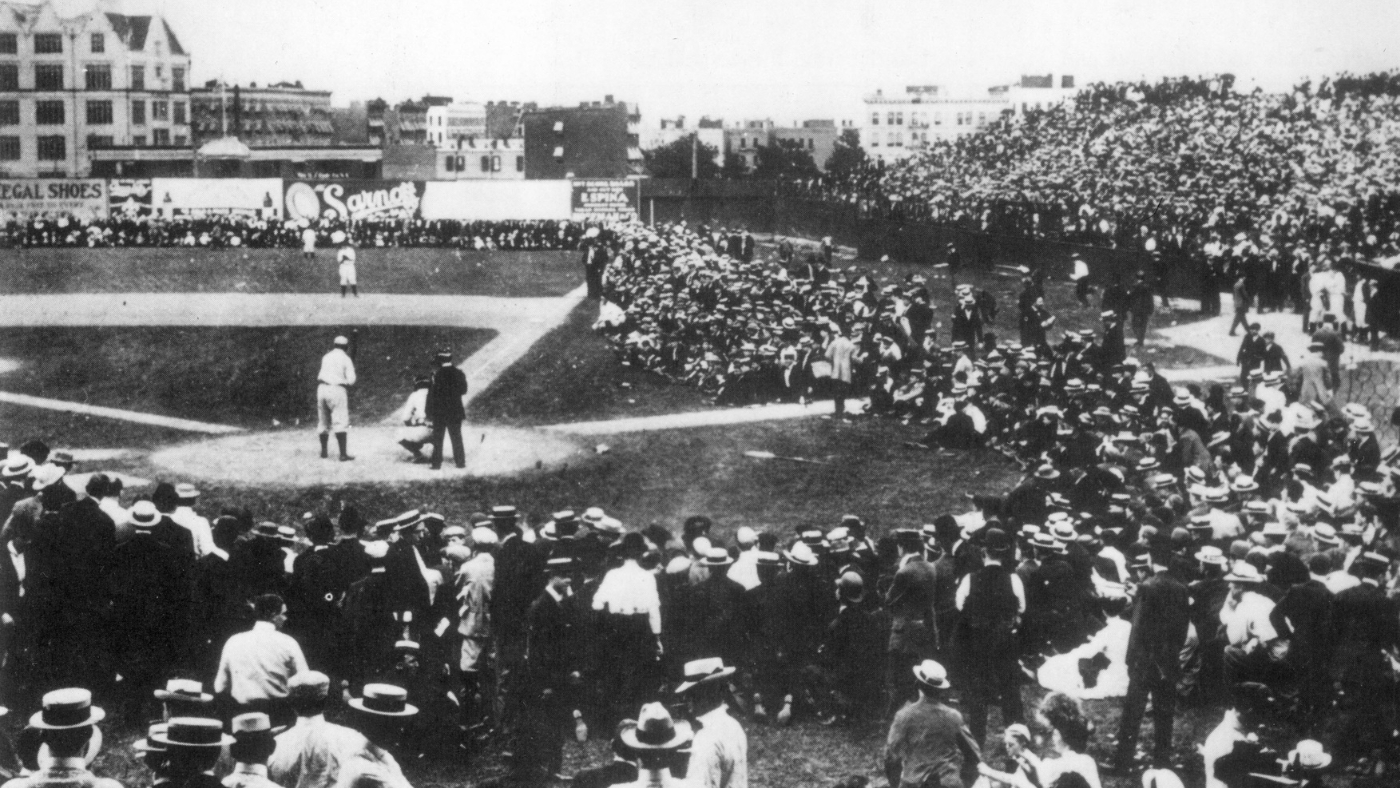
Hilltop Park, home of the Highlanders

The team's new ballpark, Hilltop Park, formally known as "American League Park", was constructed on one of Upper Manhattan's highest points—between 165th and 168th Streets in the Washington Heights neighborhood. The team was named the New York Highlanders. Fans believed the name was chosen because of the team's elevated location in Upper Manhattan, or as a nod to team president Joseph Gordon's Scottish-Irish heritage (the Gordon Highlanders were a well-known Scottish military unit). The land was owned by the New York Institute for the Education of the Blind and was leased to the Highlanders for 10 years.

Initially, the team was commonly referred to as the New York Americans. The team was also referred to as the "Invaders" in the Evening Journal and The Evening World. New York Press Sports Editor Jim Price coined the unofficial nickname Yankees (or "Yanks") for the club as early as 1904, because it was easier to fit in headlines. The Highlanders finished second in the AL in 1904, 1906, and 1910. In 1904, they lost the deciding game on a wild pitch to the Boston Americans, who later became the Boston Red Sox. That year, Highlander pitcher Jack Chesbro set the single-season wins record at 41. At this time there was no formal World Series agreement wherein the AL and NL winners would play each other.

=== 1913–1922: New owners, a new home, and a new name: Years at the Polo Grounds ===
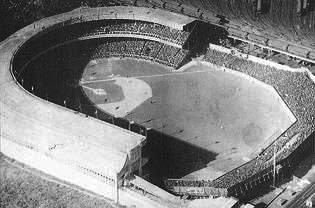
The Polo Grounds, home of the Yankees from 1913 to 1922, was demolished in 1964, after the Mets had moved to Shea Stadium in Flushing.

The Polo Grounds, (Note: The Polo Grounds were actually four different stadiums, the stadiums mentioned in this article are Polo Grounds III and IV.) located on the shore of the Harlem River in Washington Heights, was home to the New York Giants of the National League. The Giants were inter-city rivals with the Highlanders, dating back to when Giants manager John McGraw feuded with Ban Johnson after McGraw jumped from the Orioles to the Giants. Polo Grounds III burned down in 1911 and the Highlanders shared Hilltop Park with the Giants during a two-month renovation period. From 1913 to 1922, the Highlanders shared the Polo Grounds with the Giants after their lease with Hilltop Park expired. While playing at the Polo Grounds, the name "Highlanders" fell into disuse among the press. In 1913 the team, became officially known as the New York Yankees.

In the mid‑1910s, the Yankees finished towards the bottom of the standings. The relationship between Farrell and Devery became strained due to money issues and the team performance. At the start of 1915, the pair sold the team to Colonel Jacob Ruppert, a brewer, and Captain Tillinghast L'Hommedieu Huston, a contractor-engineer. Ruppert and Huston paid $350,000 (equivalent to $9,375,000 in 2021) with both men contributing half of the total price. After the purchase, Ruppert assumed the role of team president with Huston becoming team secretary and treasurer.

=== 1923–1935: Sluggers and the Stadium: Ruth, Gehrig, and Murderer's Row ===
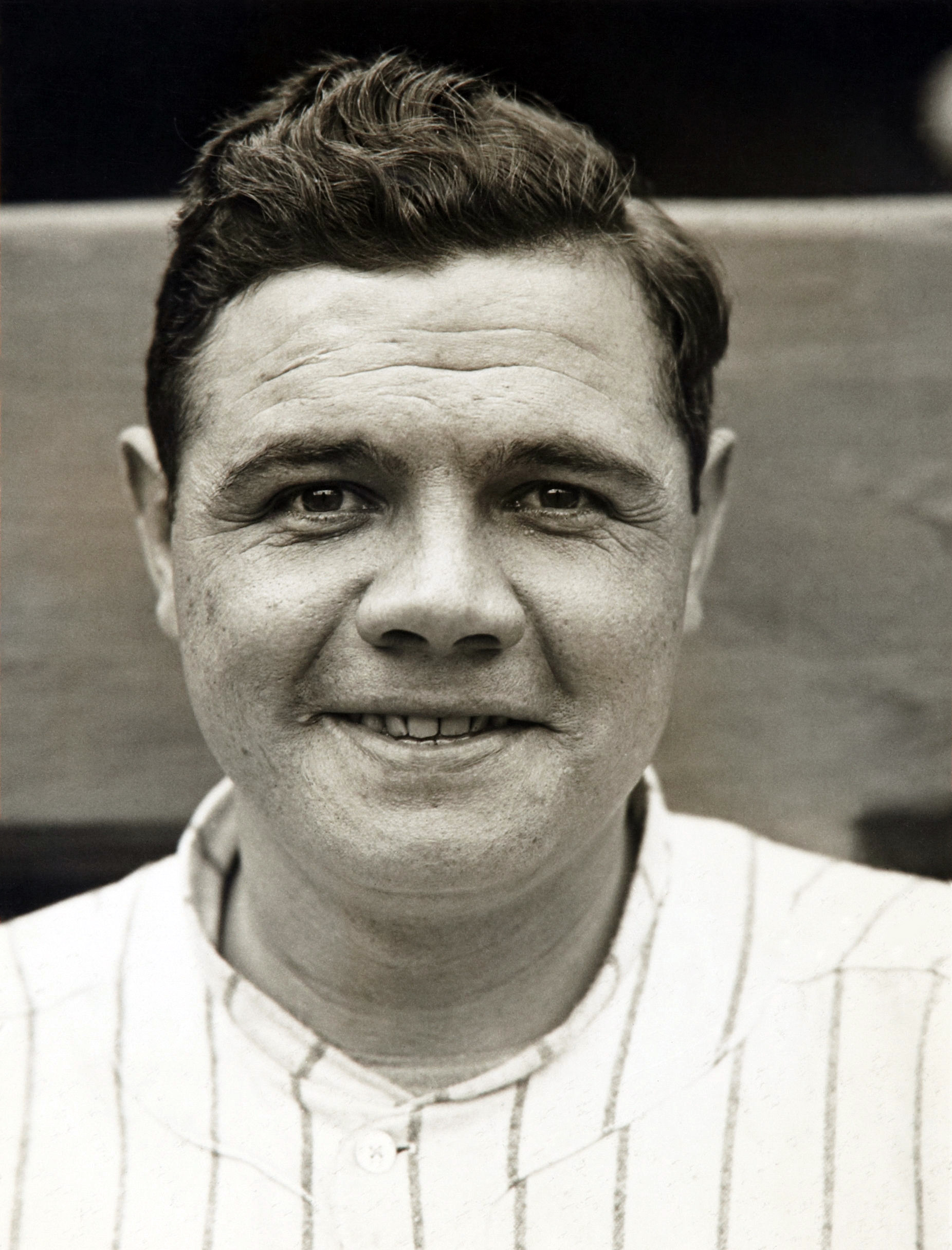
With his hitting prowess, Babe Ruth (1895–1948) ushered in an offensive-oriented era of baseball and helped lead the Yankees to four World Series titles.

In the years around 1920, the Yankees, the Red Sox, and the Chicago White Sox had a détente. The trades between the three ball clubs antagonized Ban Johnson and earned the teams the nickname "The Insurrectos". This agreement paid off well for the Yankees as they increased their payroll. Most new players who later contributed to the team's success came from the Red Sox. Their owner, Harry Frazee, was trading them for large sums of money to finance his theatrical productions. Pitcher-turned-outfielder Babe Ruth was the most talented of all the acquisitions from Boston. The outcome of that trade would haunt the Red Sox for the next 86 years, a span in which the team did not win a single World Series championship. This phenomenon eventually became known as the Curse of the Bambino, a term coined by writer Dan Shaughnessy in the 1990 book of the same name.

Ruth's multitude of home runs proved so popular that the Yankees began drawing more people than their National League counterpart, the New York Giants. In 1921, the year after acquiring Ruth, the Yankees played in their first World Series. They competed against the Giants, and all eight games of the series were played in the Polo Grounds. After the 1922 season, the Yankees were told to move out of the Polo Grounds.

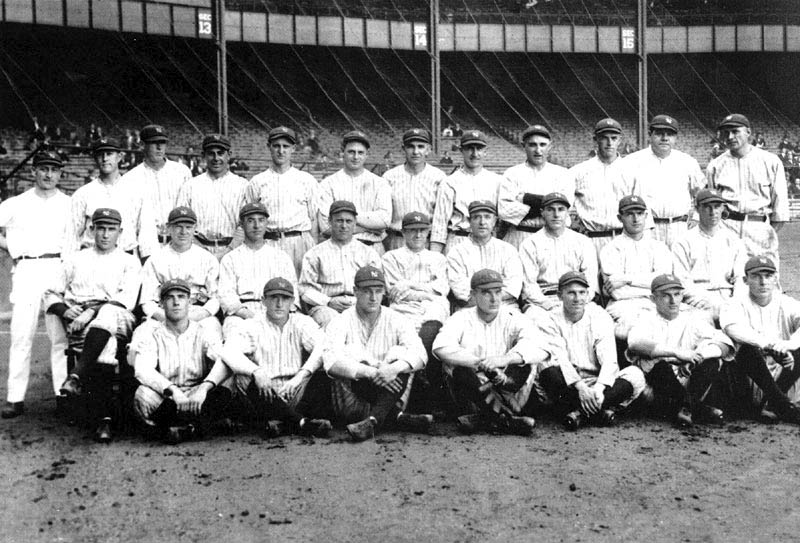
The Yankees won their first World Series title in 1923, defeating the New York Giants 4–2.

Giants manager John McGraw became upset with the increase of Yankees attendance and the number of home runs. He reportedly commented that the Yankees should "move to some out-of-the-way place, like Queens", but they instead broke ground for a new ballpark in the Bronx, right across the Harlem River from the Polo Grounds. In 1922, the Yankees returned to the World Series again and were dealt a second defeat at the hands of the Giants. Manager Miller Huggins and general manager Ed Barrow were important newcomers in this period. The hiring of Huggins by Ruppert in 1918 caused a rift between the owners, which eventually led to Ruppert buying Huston out in 1923.

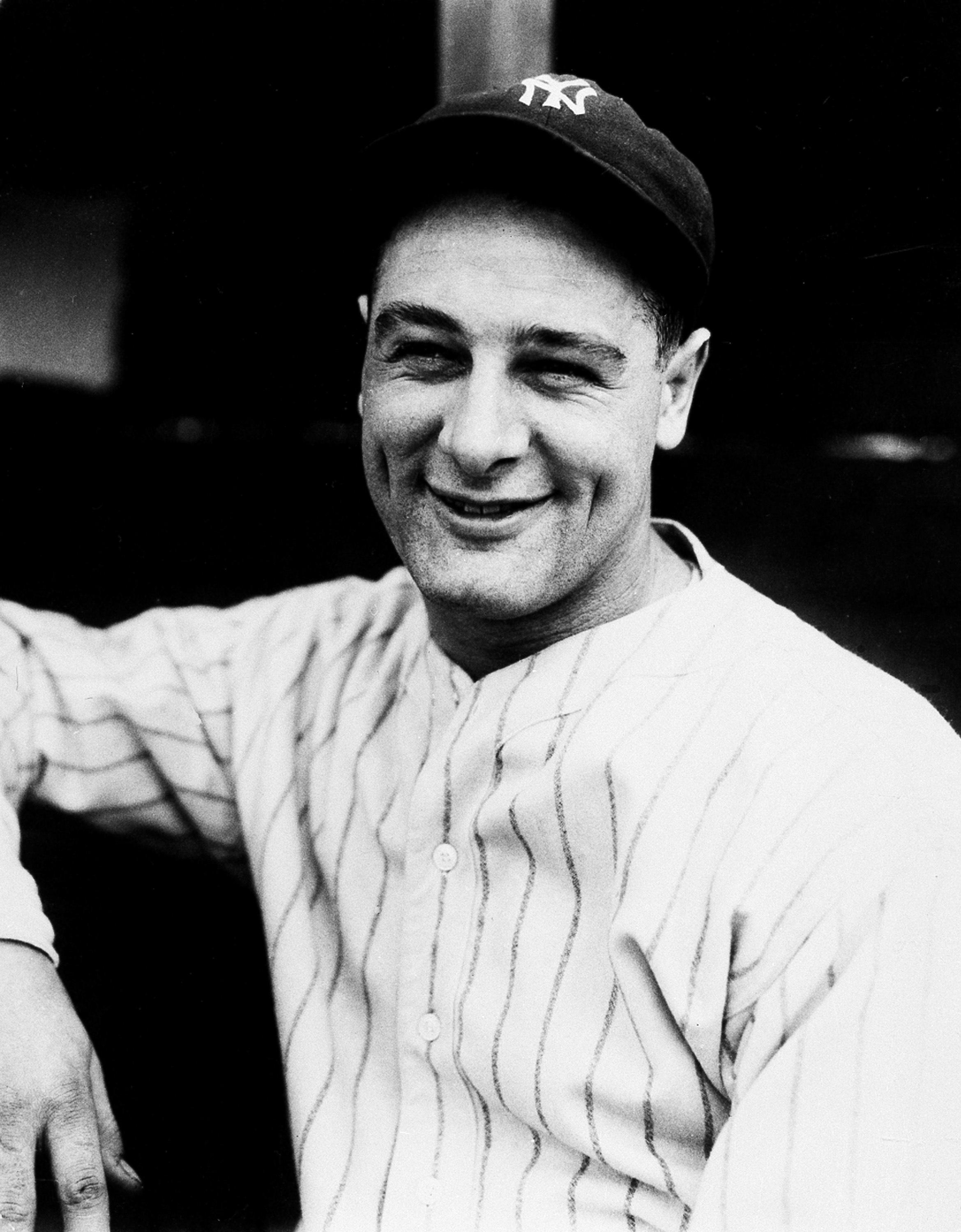
Lou Gehrig (1903–1941) was the first Yankees player to have his number retired, in 1939, which was the same year that he retired from baseball due to a crippling disease.

In 1923, the Yankees moved to their new home, Yankee Stadium, which took 11 months to build and cost $2.5 million (equivalent to $40,000,000 in 2021). The team announced that 99,200 fans showed up on Opening Day and 25,000 were turned away. In the first game at Yankee Stadium, Ruth hit a home run. The stadium was nicknamed "The House That Ruth Built", due mainly to the fact that Ruth had doubled Yankees' attendance, which helped the team pay for the new stadium. At the end of the season, the Yankees faced the Giants in the World Series for the third straight year and won their first championship.

In the 1927 season, the Yankees featured a lineup that became known as "Murderers' Row", the team is considered by some to be the best in the history of baseball, though similar claims have been made for other Yankee squads, notably those of 1939, 1961, and 1998. The name originated from The Tombs, a jail complex in Lower Manhattan that housed a specific cell block for murderers. That season, the Yankees became the first team in baseball to occupy first place every day of the season, winning 110 games. The team also swept the Pittsburgh Pirates in the World Series.

Ruth's home run total of 60 in 1927 set a single-season home run record that stood until Roger Maris broke it in 1961, although Maris had eight additional games in which to break the record. Meanwhile, first baseman Lou Gehrig had his first big season, batting .373 with 47 home runs and 175 runs batted in (RBI), beating Ruth's single-season RBI mark which he had set in 1921. The Yankees won the World Series again in 1928.

In 1931, Joe McCarthy, who was previously manager of the Chicago Cubs, was hired as manager and brought the Yankees back to the top of the AL. They swept the Chicago Cubs in the 1932 World Series, and brought the team's streak of consecutive World Series game wins to 12. This series was made famous by Babe Ruth's "Called Shot" in game three of the series at Wrigley Field, in which Ruth pointed to center field before hitting a home run. In 1935, Ruth left the Yankees to join the NL's Boston Braves, and he made his last major league baseball appearance on May 30 of that year.

=== 1936–1951: Joltin' Joe DiMaggio ===
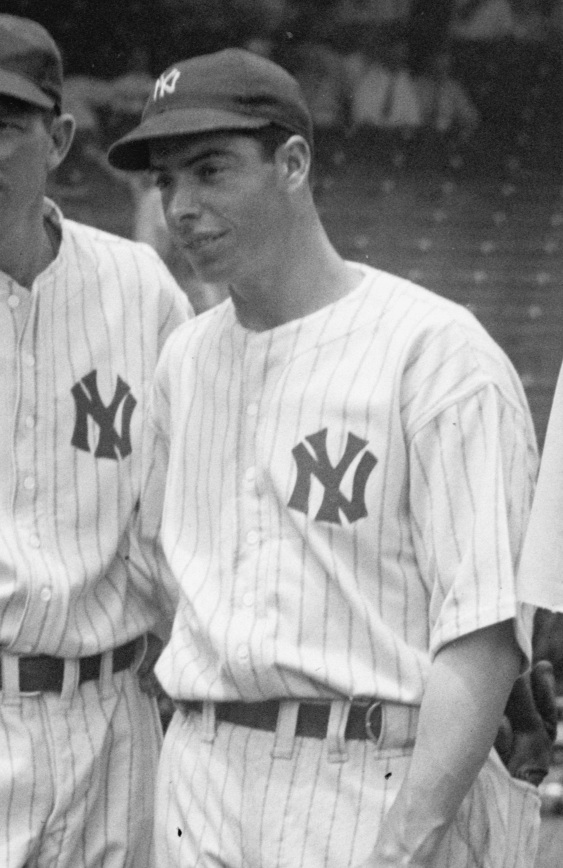
In 1941, Joe DiMaggio (1914–1999) set an MLB record with a 56-game hitting streak that stands to this day and will probably never be broken.

After Ruth left the Yankees following the 1934 season, Gehrig finally had a chance to take center stage, but it was only one year before a new star appeared, Joe DiMaggio. The team won an unprecedented four straight World Series titles from 1936 to 1939. For most of 1939, however, they had to do it without Gehrig, who took himself out of the lineup on May 2 and retired due to amyotrophic lateral sclerosis (ALS), which was later known as "Lou Gehrig's Disease" in his memory. The Yankees declared July 4, 1939, to be "Lou Gehrig Day", on which they retired his number 4, the first retired number in baseball. Gehrig made a famous speech in which he declared himself to be "the luckiest man on the face of the earth." He died two years later on June 2, 1941. The acclaimed movie The Pride of the Yankees about Gehrig was released in 1942.

The 1941 season was often described as the last year of the "Golden Era" before the United States entered World War II and other realities intervened. Numerous achievements were made in the early 1940s, including Ted Williams of the Red Sox hitting for the elusive .400 batting average and Joe DiMaggio getting hits in consecutive ballgames. By the end of his hitting streak, DiMaggio hit in 56 consecutive games, the current major league record and one often deemed unbreakable.

Two months after the Yankees beat the Brooklyn Dodgers in the 1941 World Series, the first of seven October meetings between the two crosstown rivals before the Dodgers moved to Los Angeles. As a result of the mandatory draft following the attack on Pearl Harbor, more than 90 percent of the players, including DiMaggio, were forced to suspend their playing careers and enter the military. Despite losing many of their players, the Yankees still managed to pull out a win against the St. Louis Cardinals in the 1943 World Series.

Following Jacob Ruppert's death in 1939, his heirs assumed control on the team. In 1945 construction and real estate magnate Del Webb along with partners Dan Topping and Larry MacPhail purchased the team from the Ruppert estate for $2.8 million, equivalent to roughly $47.8 million in 2023. MacPhail, who was the team president, treasurer, and general manager, was bought out following the 1947 World Series.

After a few slumping seasons, McCarthy left the organization in 1946. A few interim managers later, Bucky Harris took the job, righting the ship and taking the Yankees to a hard-fought series victory against the Dodgers. Despite finishing only three games behind the Cleveland Indians in the 1948 pennant race, Harris was relieved of his duties and replaced by Casey Stengel, who had a reputation of being a clown and managing bad teams. His tenure as Yankees' field manager, however, was marked with success.

The "underdog" Yankees came from behind to catch and surprise a powerful Red Sox team on the last two days of the 1949 season, a face-off that fueled the beginning of the modern Red Sox–Yankees rivalry. By this time, DiMaggio's career was winding down, and the "Yankee Clipper" retired after the 1951 season after numerous injuries. That year marked the arrival of Mickey Mantle, who was one of several rookies to fill the gap.

=== 1951–1959: Stengel's Squad ===
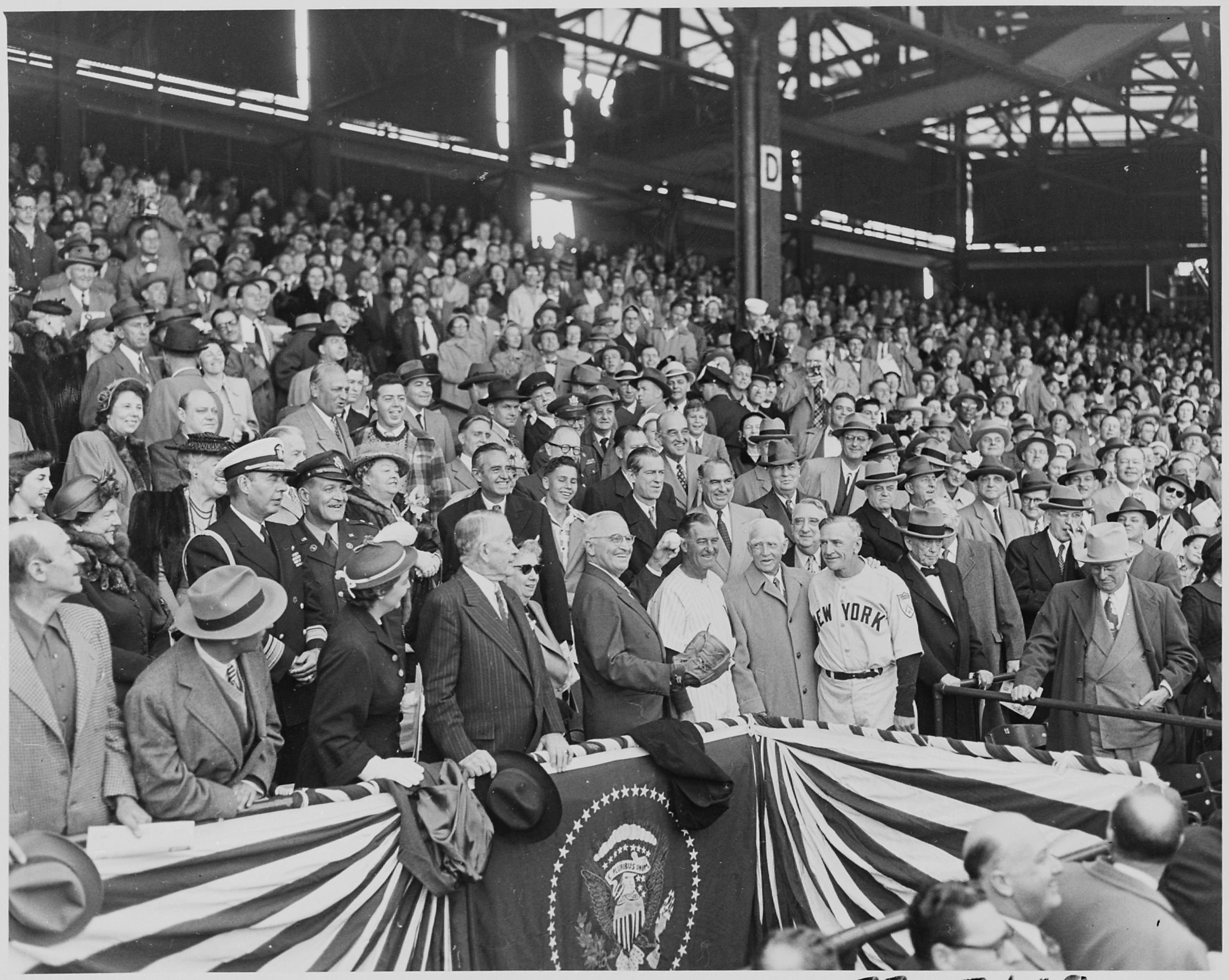
Opening Day of the 1951 baseball season at Griffith Stadium. President Harry Truman throws out the first ball as Bucky Harris and Casey Stengel look on.

Bettering the clubs managed by Joe McCarthy, the Yankees won the World Series five consecutive times from 1949 to 1953 under Stengel, which remains an MLB record. Led by players like center fielder Mickey Mantle, pitcher Whitey Ford, and catcher Yogi Berra, Stengel's teams won ten pennants and seven World Series titles in his 12 seasons as the Yankees manager. The 1950 title was the only one of those five championships not to be won against either the New York Giants or Brooklyn Dodgers; it was won in four straight games against the Whiz Kids of the Philadelphia Phillies.

In 1954, the Yankees won 103 games, but the Cleveland Indians took the pennant with a then-AL record 111 wins; 1954 was famously referred to as "The Year the Yankees Lost the Pennant". The term was coined by writer Douglass Wallop, who wrote a novel of the same name. The novel was then adapted into a musical called Damn Yankees. In 1955, the Dodgers finally beat the Yankees in the World Series, after five previous Series losses to them. The Yankees came back strong the next year. In Game 5 of the 1956 World Series against the Dodgers, pitcher Don Larsen threw the only perfect game in World Series history, which remains the only perfect game in postseason play and the only postseason no-hitter until 2010.

The Yankees lost the 1957 World Series to the Milwaukee Braves when Lew Burdette won three games for the Braves and was awarded World Series MVP. Following the Series, the New York Giants and the Brooklyn Dodgers both left for San Francisco and Los Angeles, respectively. This left the Yankees as New York's only baseball team. In the 1958 World Series, the Yankees got their revenge against the Braves and became the second team to win the Series after being down 3–1. For the decade, the Yankees won six World Series championships (1950, 1951, 1952, 1953, 1956, 1958) and eight American League pennants (those six plus 1955 and 1957). Led by Mantle, Ford, Berra, Elston Howard (the Yankees' first African-American player), and the newly acquired Roger Maris, the Yankees entered the 1960s seeking to replicate their success of the 1950s.

=== 1960–1964: Mantle and Maris ===
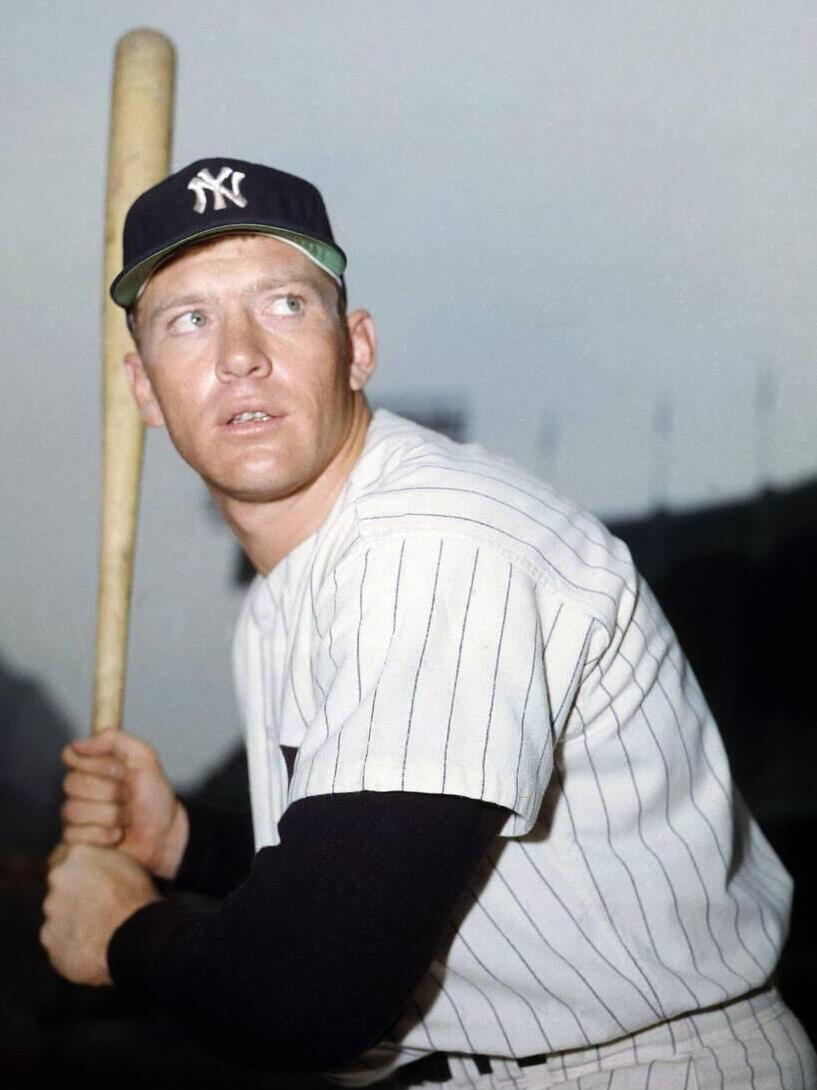
Mickey Mantle (1931–1995) was one of the franchise's most celebrated hitters, highlighted by his 1956 Triple Crown and World Series championship.

Arnold Johnson, owner of the Kansas City Athletics, was a longtime business associate of Yankees co-owners Del Webb and Dan Topping. Because of this "special relationship" with the Yankees, he traded young players to them in exchange for cash and aging veterans. Invariably, these trades ended up being heavily tilted in the Yankees' favor, leading to accusations that the Athletics were little more than a Yankees farm team at the major league level. Kansas City had been home to the Yankees' top farm team, the Kansas City Blues, for almost 20 years before the Athletics moved there from Philadelphia in 1954.

In 1960, Charles O. Finley purchased the Athletics and put an end to the trades with the Yankees. At that point the Yankees had already strengthened their supply of future prospects, which included a young outfielder named Roger Maris. In 1960, Maris led the league in slugging percentage, RBI, and extra-base hits. He finished second in home runs, one behind Mickey Mantle, and total bases, and won a Gold Glove, which garnered enough votes for the American League MVP award.

1961 was one of the most memorable years in Yankees history. Mantle and Maris hit home runs at a fast pace and became known as the "M&M Boys". Ultimately, a severe hip infection forced Mantle to leave the lineup at the end of the regular season. Maris continued though, and on October 1, the last day of the regular season, he hit home run number 61, surpassing Babe Ruth's single-season home run record of 60. However, MLB Commissioner Ford Frick decreed that since Maris had played in a 162-game season, and Ruth (in 1927) had played in a 154-game season. They were considered two separate records for 30 years, until MLB reversed course and stated Maris held the record alone. His record was broken by Mark McGwire, who hit 70 home runs in 1998. Maris held the American League record until 2022, when Aaron Judge hit 62.

The Yankees won the pennant with a 109–53 record and went on to defeat the Cincinnati Reds in the 1961 World Series. The team finished the year with 240 home runs, which was an MLB record until surpassed by the 1996 Baltimore Orioles team with 257 home runs. In 1962, the sports scene in New York changed when the National League added an expansion team, the New York Mets. The Mets played at the Giants' former home, the Polo Grounds, for two seasons while Shea Stadium was under construction in nearby Flushing, Queens. This restored New York as a city with more than one team, as it had been from the late 1800s until 1957. The Yankees won the 1962 World Series, their tenth in the past sixteen years, defeating the San Francisco Giants 4–3. It was the Yankees' last championship until 1977.

The Yankees easily reached the 1963 World Series when they won the pennant by 10.5 games, but they scored only four runs in the series and were swept by the Los Angeles Dodgers and their ace pitcher, Sandy Koufax. The series was the first between the Yankees and the new Los Angeles Dodgers, after their move in 1958. After the season, Yogi Berra, who had just retired from playing, took over managerial duties. The aging Yankees returned the next year for a fifth straight World Series, but were beaten 4–3 by the St. Louis Cardinals. It would be the Yankees' last World Series appearance until 1976.

=== 1965–1972: New ownership and a steep decline ===
In November 1964, broadcasting company CBS purchased 80% of the Yankees from Topping and Webb for $11.2 million (equivalent to $116.3 million in 2025). Four months later, Webb sold his ten percent of the club to CBS for $1.4 million; Topping held onto his ten percent until September 1966.

With the new ownership, the team began to decline. The 1965 team posted a record of 77–85 — the Yankees' first losing record in 40 years. In 1966, they finished in last place in the AL for the first time since 1912. It also marked their first consecutive losing seasons since 1917 and 1918. The 1967 season was not much better, with just 72 wins and ninth place in the American League. While their fortunes improved somewhat in the late 1960s and early 1970s, they finished higher than fourth only once during CBS' ownership, in 1970.

The Yankees were not able to replace their aging superstars with promising young talent, as they had consistently done in the previous five decades. As early as the 1961–62 off-season, longtime fans noticed that the pipeline of talent from the minor league affiliates had started to dry up. This was worsened by the introduction of the amateur draft that year, which meant that the Yankees could no longer sign any player they wanted. The Yankees were one of four teams who voted against the establishment of the draft, with the Dodgers, Mets, and Cardinals also objecting. While the Yankees usually drafted fairly early during this period due to their lackluster records, Thurman Munson was the only pick who lived up to his billing.

=== 1973–1981: Steinbrenner, Martin, Jackson, and Munson: the Bronx Zoo ===
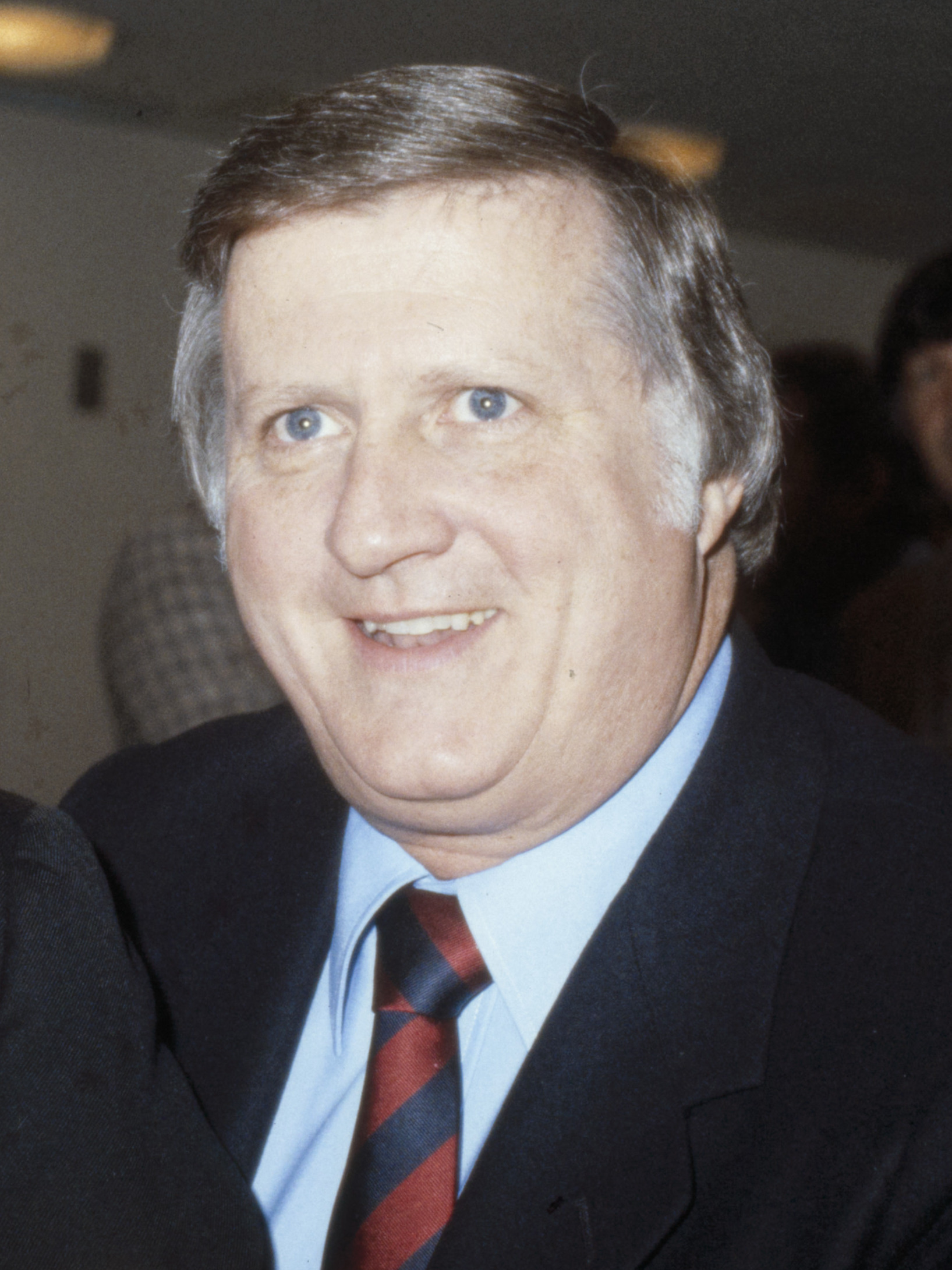
A group of investors led by George Steinbrenner purchased the team in 1973.

On January 3, 1973, CBS announced they were selling the club to a group of investors, led by Cleveland-based shipbuilder George Steinbrenner (1930–2010), for $10 million (equivalent to $72.5 million in 2025). E. Michael Burke, who assumed the role of team president in 1966, resigned as president in April but stayed with the organization as a consultant to the owner. Within a year, Steinbrenner bought out most of his other partners and became the team's principal owner, although Burke continued to hold a minority share into the 1980s.

One of Steinbrenner's major goals was to renovate Yankee Stadium. Both the stadium and the surrounding neighborhood had deteriorated by the late 1960s. CBS initially suggested renovations, but the team needed to play elsewhere, and the Mets refused to open their home, Shea Stadium, to the Yankees. A new stadium in the Meadowlands, across the Hudson River in New Jersey, was suggested and was eventually built, as Giants Stadium, specifically for football. In mid-1972, Mayor John Lindsay stepped in. The city bought the stadium and began an extensive two-year renovation period. Since the city also owned Shea Stadium, the Mets were forced to allow the Yankees to play two seasons there. The renovations modernized the look of the stadium, significantly altered the dimensions, and reconfigured some of the seating.

In 1973, Steinbrenner instituted a personal appearance policy that included being clean-shaven, with long hair slicked back or trimmed. In an interview with The New York Times, Steinbrenner stated the policy was to " instill a certain sense of order and discipline" in the players. The policy originated from Steinbrenner's service in the United States Air Force, which had a similar appearance policy. This rule was enforced by his sons after George's death, until it was modified to allow well-groomed beards in 2025. The Cincinnati Reds had the same personal appearance policy from 1967 until 1999.

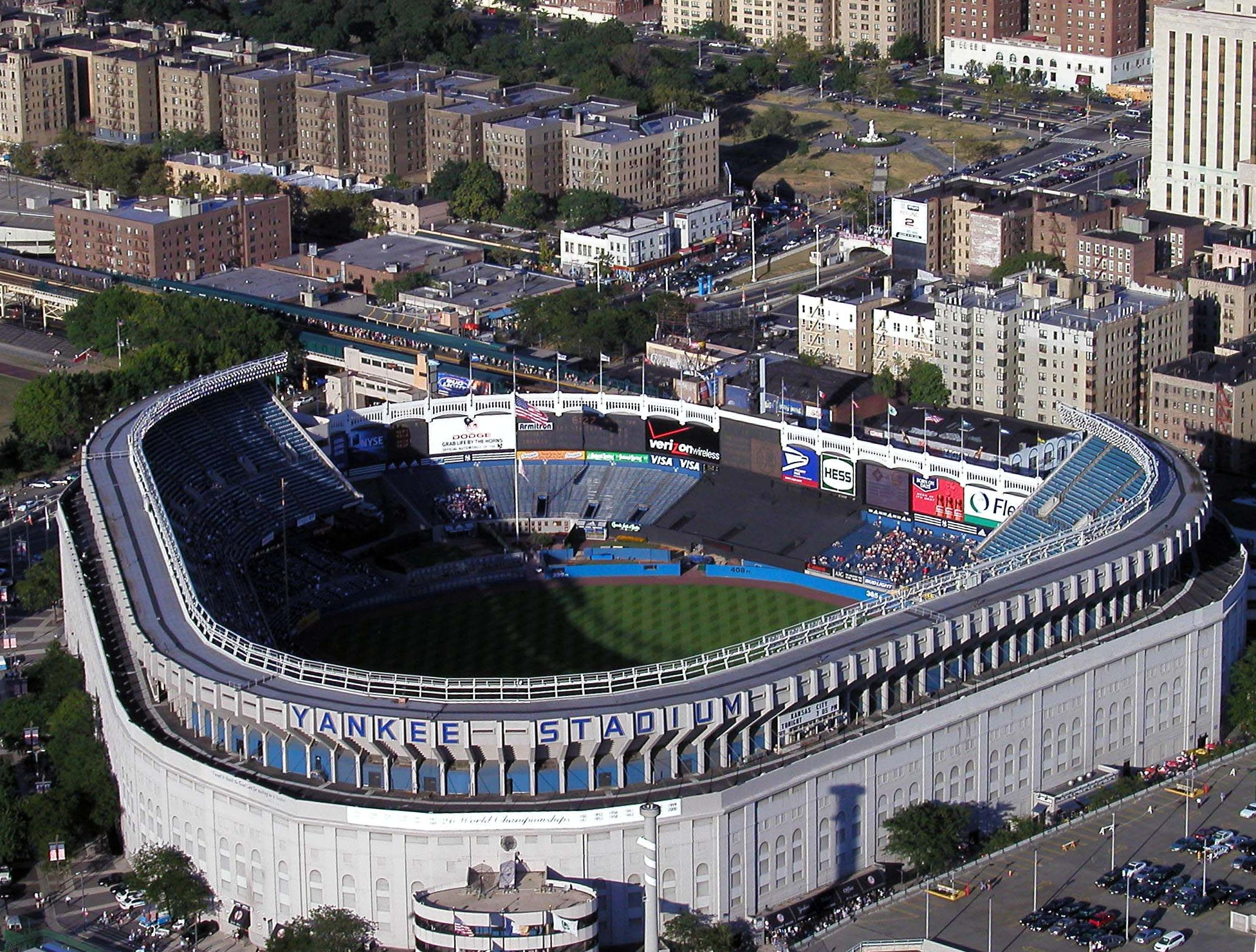
During 1974 and 1975, Yankee Stadium was renovated into its final shape and structure, as shown here in 2002, seven years before demolition.

After the 1974 season, Steinbrenner made a move that started the modern era of free agency, signing star pitcher Catfish Hunter away from Oakland. Midway through the 1975 season, the team hired former second baseman Billy Martin as manager. With Martin at the helm, the Yankees reached the 1976 World Series, but were swept by the Cincinnati Reds and their famed "Big Red Machine."

After the 1976 campaign, Steinbrenner added star Oakland outfielder Reggie Jackson—who had spent 1976 with the Baltimore Orioles—to his roster. During spring training of 1977, Jackson alienated his teammates with controversial remarks about the Yankees captain, catcher Thurman Munson. He had bad blood with manager Billy Martin, who had managed the Detroit Tigers when Jackson's Athletics defeated them in the 1972 playoffs. Jackson, Martin, and Steinbrenner repeatedly feuded with each other throughout Jackson's 5-year contract. Martin was hired and fired by Steinbrenner five times over the next 13 years. This conflict, combined with the extremely rowdy Yankees fans of the late 1970s and the bad conditions of the Bronx, led to the Yankees organization and stadium being referred to as the "Bronx Zoo". Despite the turmoil, Jackson hit four home runs in the 1977 World Series; hit three of those home runs on the first pitch of his at bats in the fourth, fifth and eighth innings of the sixth game of the World Series; earned the Series MVP Award; and got the nickname "Mr. October."

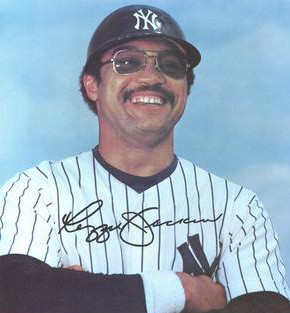
Reggie Jackson's tenure with the Yankees defined their "Bronx Zoo" era of the late 1970s.

Throughout the late 1970s, the race for the pennant was often a close competition between the Yankees and the Red Sox. Despite that, during the 1978 season, the Red Sox were 14 1/2 games ahead of the Yankees in July. In late July, Martin suspended Reggie Jackson and fined him $9,000 (equivalent to $44,000 in 2025) for "defiance" after he bunted while Martin had the "swing" signal on. Upon Jackson's return, Martin made a famous statement against both Jackson and owner Steinbrenner: "They deserve each other. One's a born liar; the other's convicted." Martin was forced to resign the next day and was replaced by Bob Lemon. This came while the team was winning five games in a row and Boston was losing five in a row.

The Yankees continued to win games, and by the time they met Boston for a pivotal four-game series at Fenway Park in early September, the Yankees were four games behind the Red Sox. The Yankees swept the Red Sox in what became known as the "Boston Massacre", winning the games 15–3, 13–2, 7–0, and 7–4. The third game was a shutout pitched by Ron Guidry, who led the majors with nine shutouts, a 25–3 record, and a 1.74 ERA. On the last day of the season, the two clubs finished in a tie for first place in the AL East, and a tiebreaker game was held at Fenway Park. With Guidry pitching against former Yankee Mike Torrez, the Red Sox took an early 2–0 lead. In the seventh inning, light-hitting Yankee shortstop Bucky Dent drove a three-run home run over the Fenway Park's Green Monster, putting the Yankees up 3–2. Reggie Jackson's solo home run in the following inning sealed the eventual 5–4 win that gave the Yankees their one-hundredth win of the season and their third straight AL East title. Guidry earned his 25th win of the season.

After defeating the Kansas City Royals for the third consecutive year in the ALCS, the Yankees faced the Los Angeles Dodgers in the World Series. They lost the first two games in Los Angeles, but won all three games at Yankee Stadium and Game 6 back in Los Angeles, winning their 22nd world championship. Changes occurred during the 1979 season. Former Cy Young Award-winning closer Sparky Lyle was traded to the Texas Rangers for several players, including Dave Righetti. Tommy John was acquired from the Dodgers and Luis Tiant from the Red Sox to bolster the pitching staff. During the season, Bob Lemon was replaced by Billy Martin, who was serving his second stint as Yankees manager.

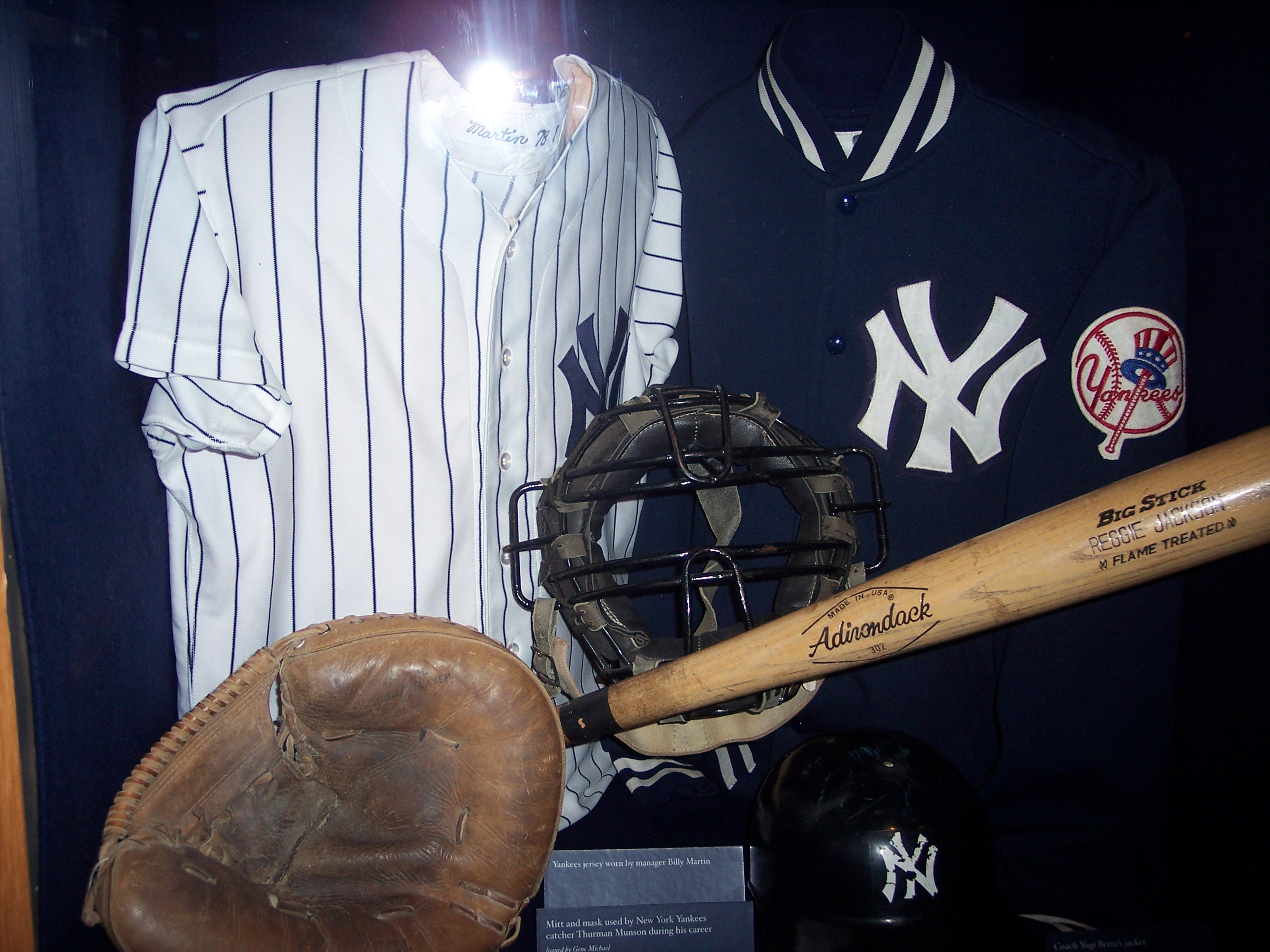
The mask and catcher's mitt of Thurman Munson, the team captain who was killed in a plane crash in 1979

On August 2, 1979, catcher Thurman Munson died when his private plane crashed while he was practicing touch-and-go landings. Four days later, the entire team flew out to Canton, Ohio, for the funeral, despite having a game later that day against the Orioles. Bobby Murcer, a close friend of Munson's, along with Lou Piniella, were chosen to give the eulogy at his funeral. In a nationally televised and emotional game, Murcer used Munson's bat (which he gave to Munson's wife after the game), and drove in all five of the team's runs in a dramatic 5–4 walk-off victory. Before the game, Munson's locker sat empty except for his catching gear, a sad reminder for his teammates. His locker, labeled with his number 15, has remained empty in the Yankees clubhouse as a memorial. When the Yankees moved across the street, Munson's locker was torn out and installed in the new stadium's museum. Immediately after Munson's death, the team announced his number 15 would be retired.

The 1980 season brought more changes. Billy Martin was fired once again and Dick Howser took his place. Chris Chambliss was traded to the Toronto Blue Jays for catcher Rick Cerone. Reggie Jackson hit .300 for the only time in his career with 41 homers, and finished second in the MVP voting to Kansas City's George Brett. The Yankees won 103 games and the AL East by three games over the Baltimore Orioles, but were swept by the Royals in the ALCS.

After the season ended, the Yankees signed Dave Winfield to a 10-year contract. A contract misunderstanding led to a feud between Winfield and Steinbrenner. The team fired Howser and replaced him with Gene Michael. Under Michael, the Yankees led the AL East before a strike hit in June 1981. The Yankees struggled under Bob Lemon, who replaced Michael for the second half of the season. Thanks to the split-season playoff format, the Yankees faced the second-half winner Milwaukee Brewers in the special 1981 American League Division Series. After defeating Milwaukee 3–2, they swept the Oakland Athletics in a three-game ALCS. In the World Series, the Yankees won the first two games against the Los Angeles Dodgers. But the Dodgers fought back to win the next four games to claim the World Series title.

=== 1982–1995: Struggles during the Mattingly years ===
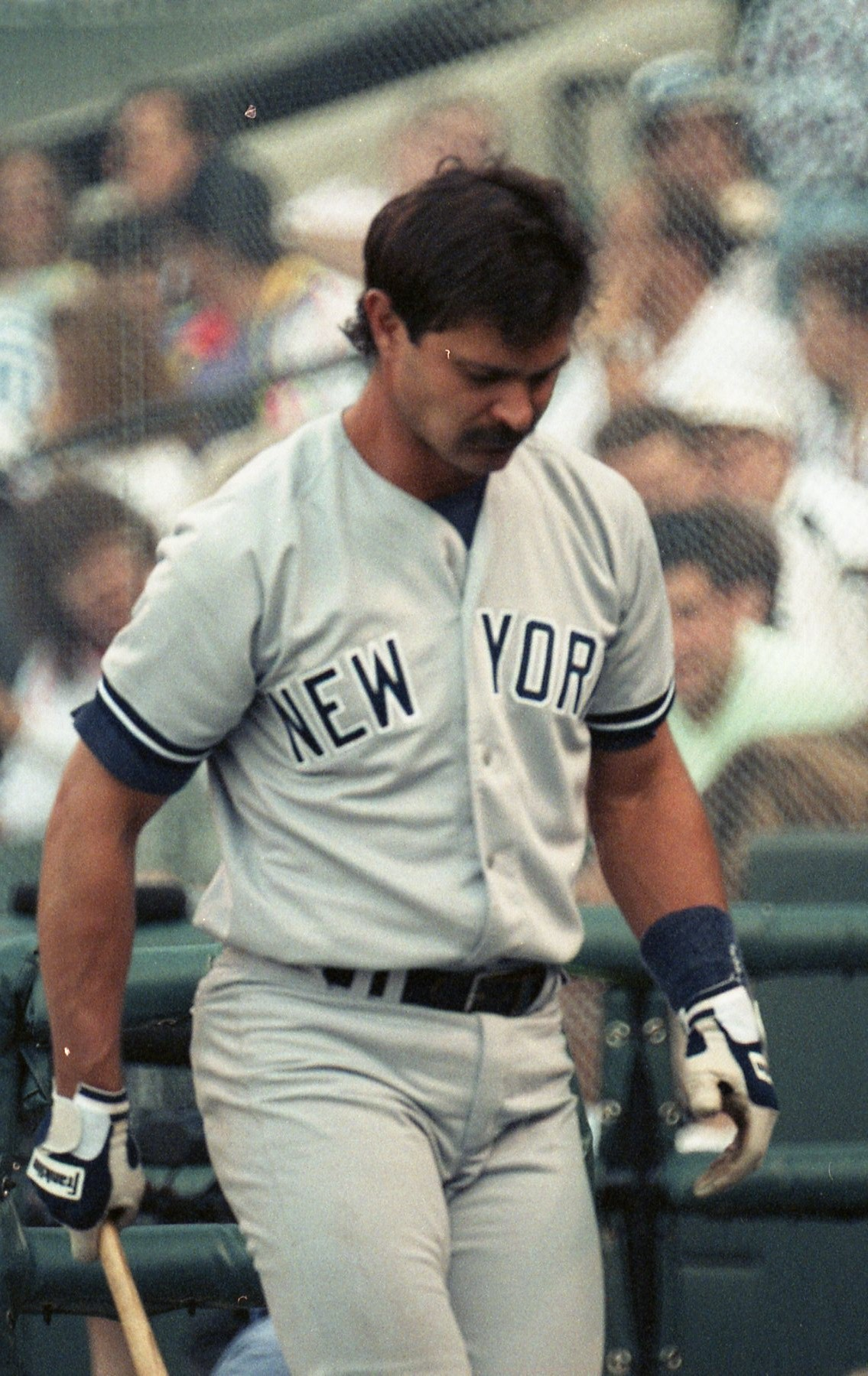
Don Mattingly headlined a Yankees franchise that struggled in the 1980s.

Following the team's loss to the Dodgers in the 1981 World Series, the Yankees began their longest absence from the playoffs since 1921. Steinbrenner announced his plan to transform the Yankees from the "Bronx Bombers" into the "Bronx Burners", increasing the Yankees' ability to win games based on speed and defense instead of relying on home runs. As a first step towards this end, the Yankees signed Dave Collins from the Cincinnati Reds during the 1981 off-season. Collins was traded to the Toronto Blue Jays after the 1982 season in a deal that also included future All-Stars Fred McGriff and Mike Morgan. In return the Yankees got Dale Murray and Tom Dodd.

The Yankees of the 1980s were led by All-Star first baseman Don Mattingly. In spite of accumulating the most total wins of any major league team, they failed to win a World Series (the 1980s were the first decade since the 1910s in which the Yankees did not win at least two Series) and had only two playoff appearances. They consistently had a powerful offense, with Mattingly and Winfield competing for the best average in the AL for the 1984 season.

Despite their offense, the Yankees teams of the 1980s lacked sufficient starting pitching to win a championship in the 1980s. After posting a 22–6 record in 1985, arm problems caught up with Guidry, and his performance declined over the next three years. He retired after the 1988 season. Of the remaining mainstays of the Yankees' rotation, only Dave Righetti stood out, pitching a no-hitter on July 4, 1983, but he was moved to the bullpen the next year where he helped to define the closer role.

Despite the Yankees' lack of pitching success during the 1980s, they had three of the premier pitchers of the early 1990s on their roster during these years in Al Leiter, Doug Drabek and José Rijo. All were mismanaged and dealt away before they could reach their full potential, with only Rijo returning much value – he was traded to the Oakland A's in the deal that brought Henderson to New York. The team came close to winning the AL East in 1985 and 1986, finishing second to the Toronto Blue Jays and Boston Red Sox, respectively, but fell to fourth place in 1987 and fifth in 1988, despite having mid-season leads in the AL East both years.

By the end of the decade, the Yankees' offense declined. Henderson and third baseman Mike Pagliarulo had departed by the middle of 1989, while back problems hampered both Winfield (who missed the entire 1989 season) and Mattingly (who missed almost the entire second half of 1990). Winfield's tenure with the team ended when he was dealt to the California Angels. From 1989 to 1992, the team had a losing record, spending significant money on free-agents and draft picks who did not live up to expectations. In 1990, the Yankees had the worst record in the American League, and their fourth last-place finish in franchise history.

During the 1990 season, Yankee fans started to chant "1918!" to taunt the Red Sox, reminding them of the last time they won a World Series one weekend the Red Sox were there in 1990. Each time the Red Sox were at Yankee Stadium afterward, chants of "1918!" echoed through the stadium. Yankee fans also taunted the Red Sox with signs saying "CURSE OF THE BAMBINO", pictures of Babe Ruth, and wearing "1918!" T-shirts each time they were at the stadium. These fans came to be known as the Bleacher Creatures.

The poor showings in the 1980s and early 1990s soon changed. Steinbrenner hired Howard Spira to uncover damaging information on Winfield and was subsequently suspended from day-to-day team operations by Commissioner Fay Vincent for two years when the plot was revealed. This turn of events allowed management to implement a coherent acquisition and development program without owner interference. General Manager Gene Michael, along with manager Buck Showalter, shifted the club's emphasis from high-priced acquisitions to developing talent through the farm system. This new philosophy developed key players such as outfielder Bernie Williams, shortstop Derek Jeter, catcher Jorge Posada, and pitchers Andy Pettitte and Mariano Rivera.

The first significant success came in 1994, when the Yankees had the best record in the AL, but the season was cut short by a players' strike. Since the Yankees' last post season appearance was also in a season cut short by a strike, the news media constantly reminded the Yankees about the parallels between these two Yankees teams, which included both teams having division leads taken away by strike. Throughout October, the media continued to speculate about what might have been if there had not been a strike, making references to the day's games in the postseason would have been played.

A year later, the team qualified for the playoffs in the new wild card slot in the strike-shortened 1995 season. In the memorable 1995 American League Division Series against the Seattle Mariners, the Yankees won the first two games at home and lost the next three in Seattle. Although Mattingly batted .417 with a home run and six RBI in the only postseason series of his career, his back problems led him to retire after the 1997 season after sitting out the 1996 season.

=== 1996–2007: Core Four: Jeter, Posada, Pettitte, and Rivera ===
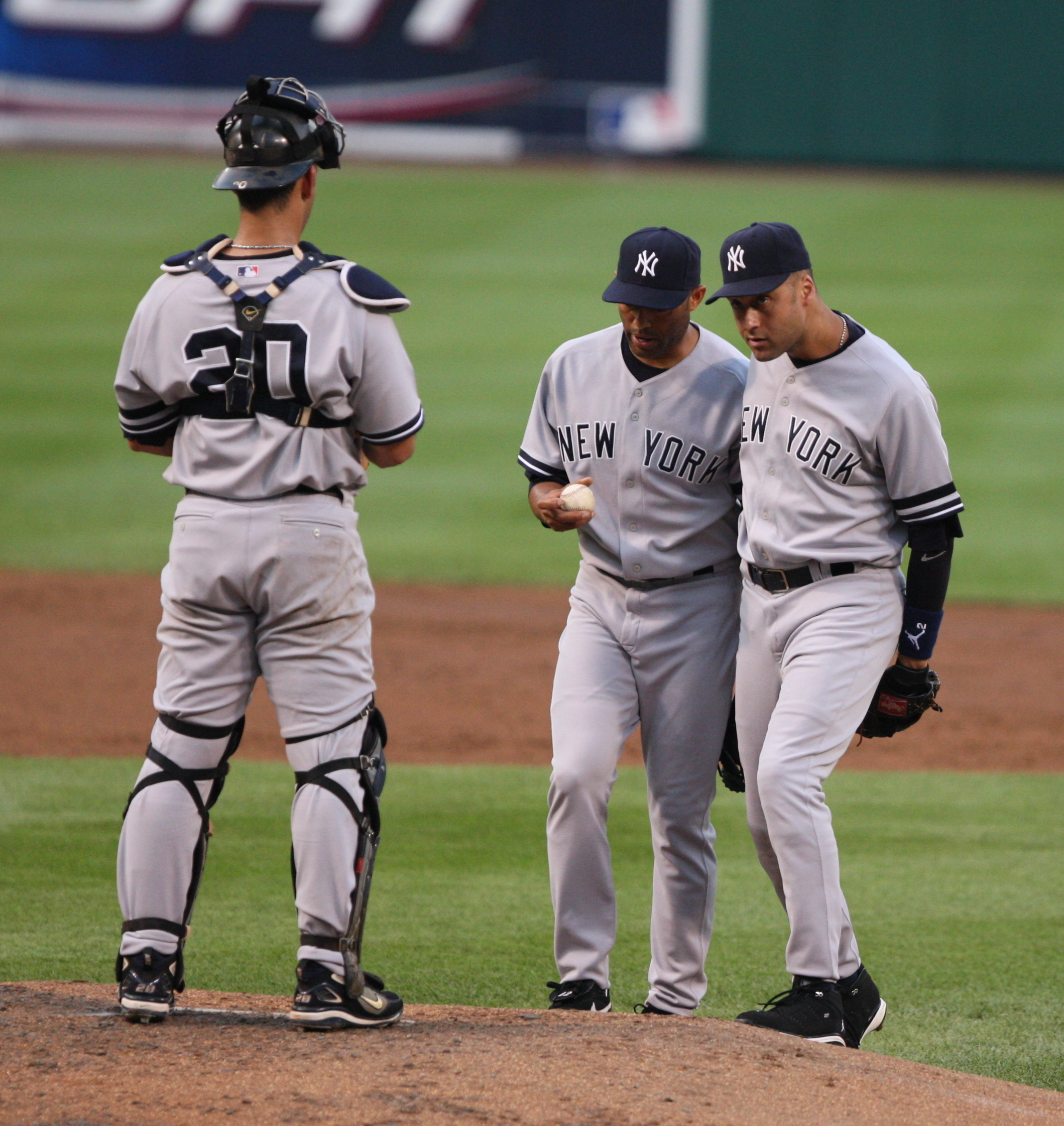
The Yankees' success in the late 1990s and early 2000s was built from a core of productive players that included Jorge Posada, Mariano Rivera, and Derek Jeter.

Joe Torre had a mediocre run as a manager in the National League, and the choice was initially derided ("Clueless Joe" was a headline in the New York Daily News). However, his calm demeanor proved to be a good fit, and his tenure was the longest under George Steinbrenner's ownership. Torre was announced as the new Yankees manager in November 1995.

The 1996 season saw the rise of three Yankees who formed the core of the team for years to come: rookie shortstop Derek Jeter, second-year starting pitcher Andy Pettitte, and second-year pitcher Mariano Rivera, who served as setup man in 1996 before becoming closer in 1997. Aided by these young players, the Yankees won their first AL East title in 15 years. They defeated the Texas Rangers in the ALDS, and in ALCS beat the Baltimore Orioles 4–1, which included a notable fan interference by Jeffrey Maier that was called as a home run for the Yankees.

In the World Series the team rebounded from an 0–2 series deficit and defeated the defending champion Atlanta Braves, ending an 18-year championship drought. Jeter was named Rookie of the Year. In 1997, the Yankees lost the 1997 ALDS to the Cleveland Indians 3–2. General manager Bob Watson stepped down and was replaced by assistant general manager Brian Cashman.

The 1998 Yankees are widely acknowledged to be one of the greatest teams in baseball history, compiling a record of 114–48, a then–AL record for the most wins in a season. On May 17, 1998, David Wells pitched a perfect game against the Minnesota Twins. The Yankees went on to sweep the San Diego Padres in the World Series. Their 125 combined regular and postseason wins remains an MLB single-season record. On July 18, 1999, David Cone pitched a perfect game against the Montreal Expos. The ALCS was the Yankees' first postseason meeting with the rival Red Sox. The 1999 Yankees defeated the Red Sox 4–1 and swept the Braves in the 1999 World Series giving the 1998–99 Yankees a combined 22–3 record in the (including four series sweeps) in the six post-season series those years.

In 2000, the Yankees faced the Mets in the first New York City Subway World Series in 44 years. The Yankees won the series in 5 games, but a loss in Game 3 snapped their streak of consecutive games won in World Series contests at 14, surpassing the club's previous record of 12 (in 1927, 1928, and 1932). The Yankees are the last MLB team to repeat as World Series champions and after the 2000 season they joined the Yankees teams of 1936–39 and 1949–53, as well as the 1972–74 Oakland Athletics as the only teams to win at least three consecutive World Series.

In aftermath of the September 11, 2001, terrorist attacks, the Yankees defeated the Oakland Athletics in the ALDS, and the Seattle Mariners in the ALCS. By winning the pennant for a fourth straight year, the 1998–2001 Yankees joined the 1921–24 New York Giants, and the Yankees teams of 1936–39, 1949–53, 1955–58 and 1960–64 as the only teams to win at least four straight pennants. The Yankees won 11 consecutive postseason series in this 4-year period. In the World Series against the Arizona Diamondbacks, the Yankees lost the series when Rivera uncharacteristically blew a save in the bottom of the ninth inning of Game 7. Also, despite a very poor series overall, batting under .200, Derek Jeter got the nickname, "Mr. November", echoing comparisons to Reggie Jackson's "Mr. October", for his walk-off home run in Game 4, though it began October 31, as the game ended in the first minutes of November 1. In addition, Yankee Stadium played host for a memorial service titled "Prayer for America" for the September 11 victims.

A vastly revamped Yankees team finished the 2002 season with an AL-best record of 103–58. The season was highlighted by Alfonso Soriano becoming the first second baseman ever to hit 30 home runs and steal 30 bases in a season. In the ALDS the Yankees lost to the eventual World Series champion Anaheim Angels 3–1. In 2003, the Yankees again had the best league record (101–61), highlighted by Roger Clemens' 300th win and 4000th strikeout. In the ALCS, they defeated the Boston Red Sox in a dramatic seven-game series, which featured a bench-clearing incident in Game 3 and a series-ending walk-off home run by Aaron Boone in the bottom of the 11th inning of Game 7. In the World Series the Yankees lost in 6 games to the Florida Marlins.

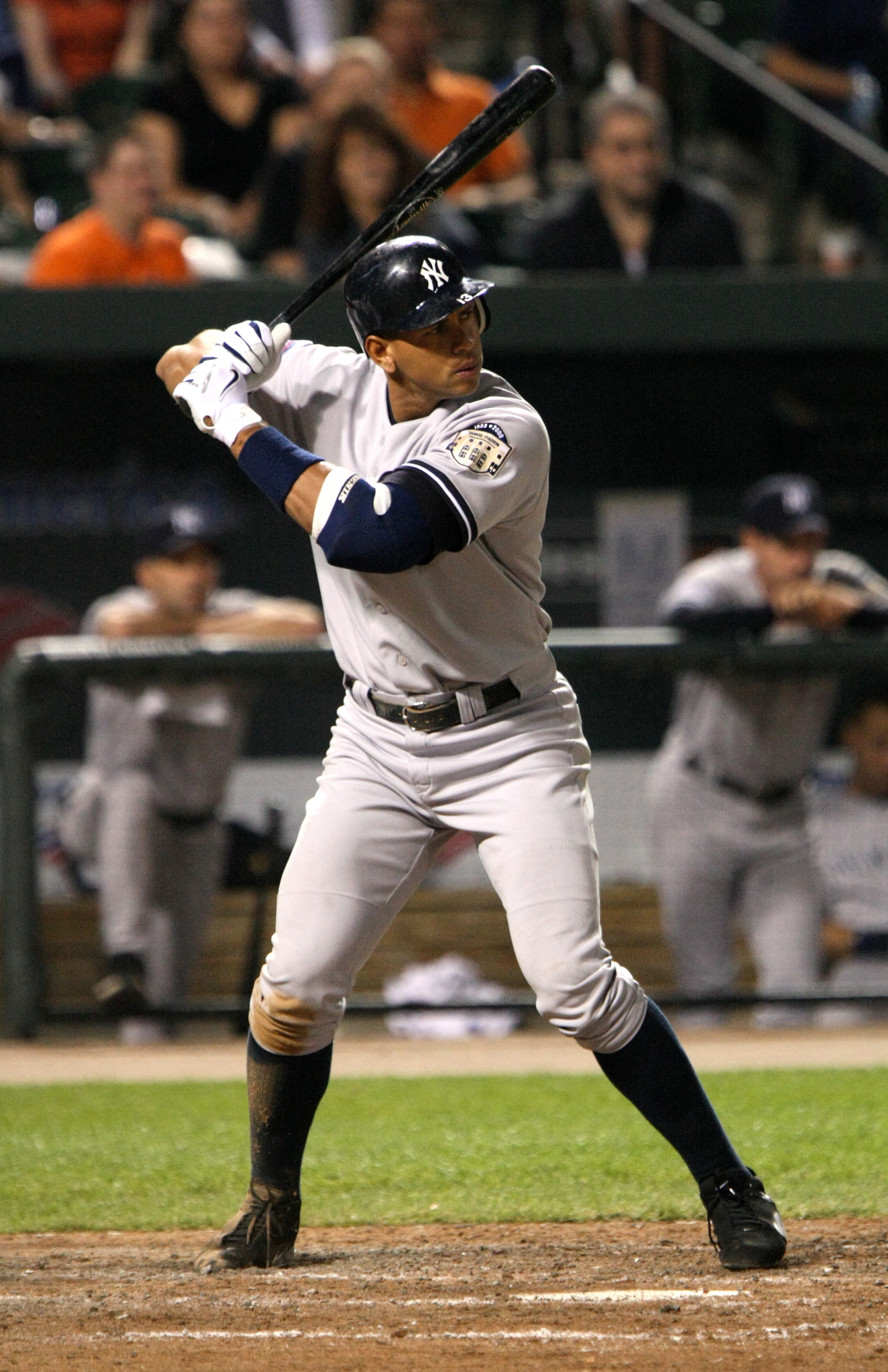
Alex Rodriguez was acquired via trade in 2004, and would go on to win two AL MVP awards with the team

In 2004, the Yankees traded Alfonso Soriano to the Texas Rangers in exchange for star shortstop Alex Rodriguez, who moved to third base from his usual shortstop position to accommodate Jeter. In the ALCS, the Yankees met the Boston Red Sox again, and became the first team in professional baseball history, and only the third team in North American professional sports history, to lose a best-of-seven series after taking a 3–0 series lead. The Red Sox would go on to defeat the Cardinals in the World Series, their first championship since 1918. In 2005 Alex Rodriguez won the American League MVP award, becoming the first Yankee to win the award since Don Mattingly in 1985. The 2006 season was highlighted by a 5-game series sweep of the Red Sox at Fenway Park (sometimes referred to as the "Second Boston Massacre"), outscoring the Red Sox 49–26.

The Yankees' streak of nine straight AL East division titles ended in 2007, but they still reached the playoffs with the AL Wild Card. For the third year in a row, the team lost in the first round of the playoffs, as the Cleveland Indians defeated the Yankees, 3–1, in the 2007 ALDS. After the series, Joe Torre declined a reduced-length and compensation contract offer from the Yankees and returned to the National League as manager of the Los Angeles Dodgers.

=== 2008–2016: Championship run, followed by pennant drought ===
After Torre's departure, the Yankees signed former catcher Joe Girardi to a three-year contract to manage the club. The 2008 season was the last season played at Yankee Stadium. To celebrate the final year and history of Yankee Stadium, the 2008 Major League Baseball All-Star Game was played there. The final regular-season game at Yankee Stadium was played on September 21, 2008, with the Yankees defeating the Orioles. After the game, Jeter addressed the crowd, thanking them for their support over the years, and urging them to "take the memories of this field, add them to the new memories that will come at the new Yankee Stadium and continue to pass them on from generation to generation." Despite multiple midseason roster moves, the team was hampered by injuries and missed the playoffs for the first time in 14 seasons.

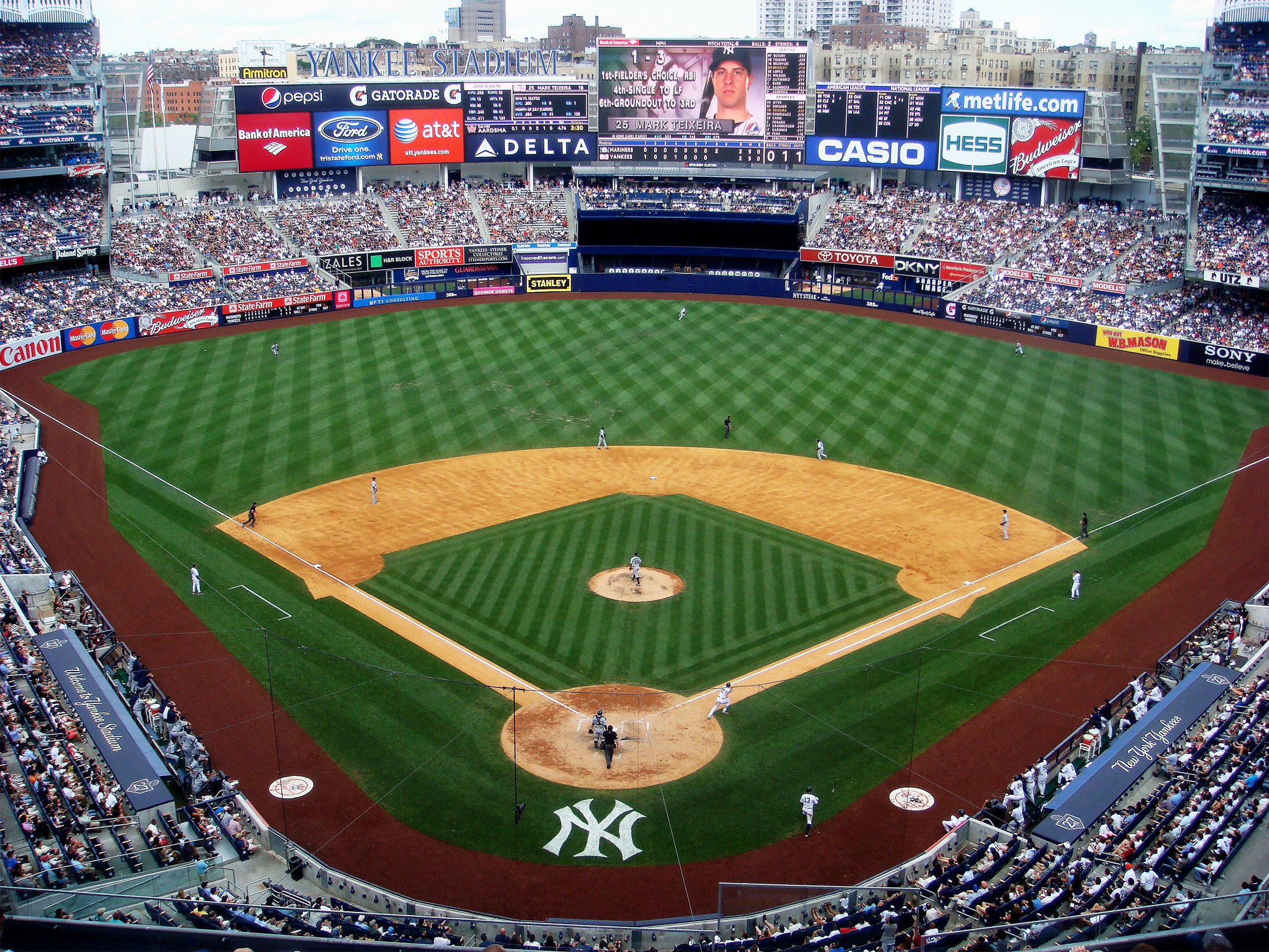
The new Yankee Stadium opened in 2009 and was christened with a World Series victory in the same way that the original Yankee Stadium was christened with a World Series victory when it opened in 1923.

During the off-season, the Yankees retooled their roster with several star free agent acquisitions, including CC Sabathia, Mark Teixeira, and A. J. Burnett. At the beginning of the 2009 season, the Yankees opened the new Yankee Stadium, located just a block north on River Avenue from their former home. The Yankees set a major league record by playing error-free ball for 18 consecutive games from May 14 to June 1, 2009. In the ALDS they swept the Minnesota Twins before defeating the Los Angeles Angels in the ALCS, 4–2. They Yankees defeated the Philadelphia Phillies, in the World Series 4–2, winning their 27th World Series title; Hideki Matsui was World Series MVP.

During the 2010 All-Star break, public address announcer Bob Sheppard and principal owner George Steinbrenner died. Eight days later, another longtime Yankee icon, former player and manager Ralph Houk, died.

In a 22–9 win over the Oakland Athletics on August 25, 2011, the Yankees became the first team in Major League history to hit three grand slams in a single game. They were hit by Robinson Canó, Russell Martin, and Curtis Granderson.

In 2012, the Yankees again finished the season with the AL's best record at 95–67. In mid-July, the Yankees traded two prospects to the Seattle Mariners for Ichiro Suzuki. They faced the Orioles in the ALDS. In Game 3, Raúl Ibañez became the oldest player to hit two home runs in a game, the oldest to hit a walk-off home run, the first substitute position player in a postseason game to hit two home runs, and the first to hit two home runs in the 9th inning or later in a postseason game, in the Yankees' 3–2 win. The Yankees defeated the Orioles in five games. However, in the ALCS, the Yankees lost to the Tigers again, this time in a four-game sweep, which was compounded with a struggling offense and a season-ending injury to Derek Jeter.

On April 12, 2013, the Yankees made their second triple play ever. It was scored as 4–6–5–6–5–3–4, the first triple play of its kind in baseball history. On September 25, the Yankees lost to the Tampa Bay Rays, which for the second time in the wild-card era, eliminated them from playoff contention. They ended the season 85–77, finishing in 3rd place in the AL East.

On September 25, 2014, Jeter – playing his final home game – hit a walk-off single off pitcher Evan Meek to defeat the Baltimore Orioles in front of a sold out stadium. Reliever Dellin Betances finished 3rd in voting for AL Rookie of the Year, while starting pitcher Masahiro Tanaka finished 5th.

Before the 2016 season began, the Yankees acquired closer Aroldis Chapman. The triumvirate of Betances, Chapman, and Miller became known by fans as "No Runs–D.M.C.", owing to the relievers' dominance of opposing hitters. The Yankees struggled through the 2016 season, ending at 4th place in the AL East. The resurgent 2015 experienced by Rodriguez and Teixeira did not carry over, as they batted .200 and .204 for the season, respectively. At the trade deadline, the Yankees stood at an uninspiring 52–52, and decided to become sellers rather than buyers.

=== 2017–present: The Judge era and return to the World Series ===
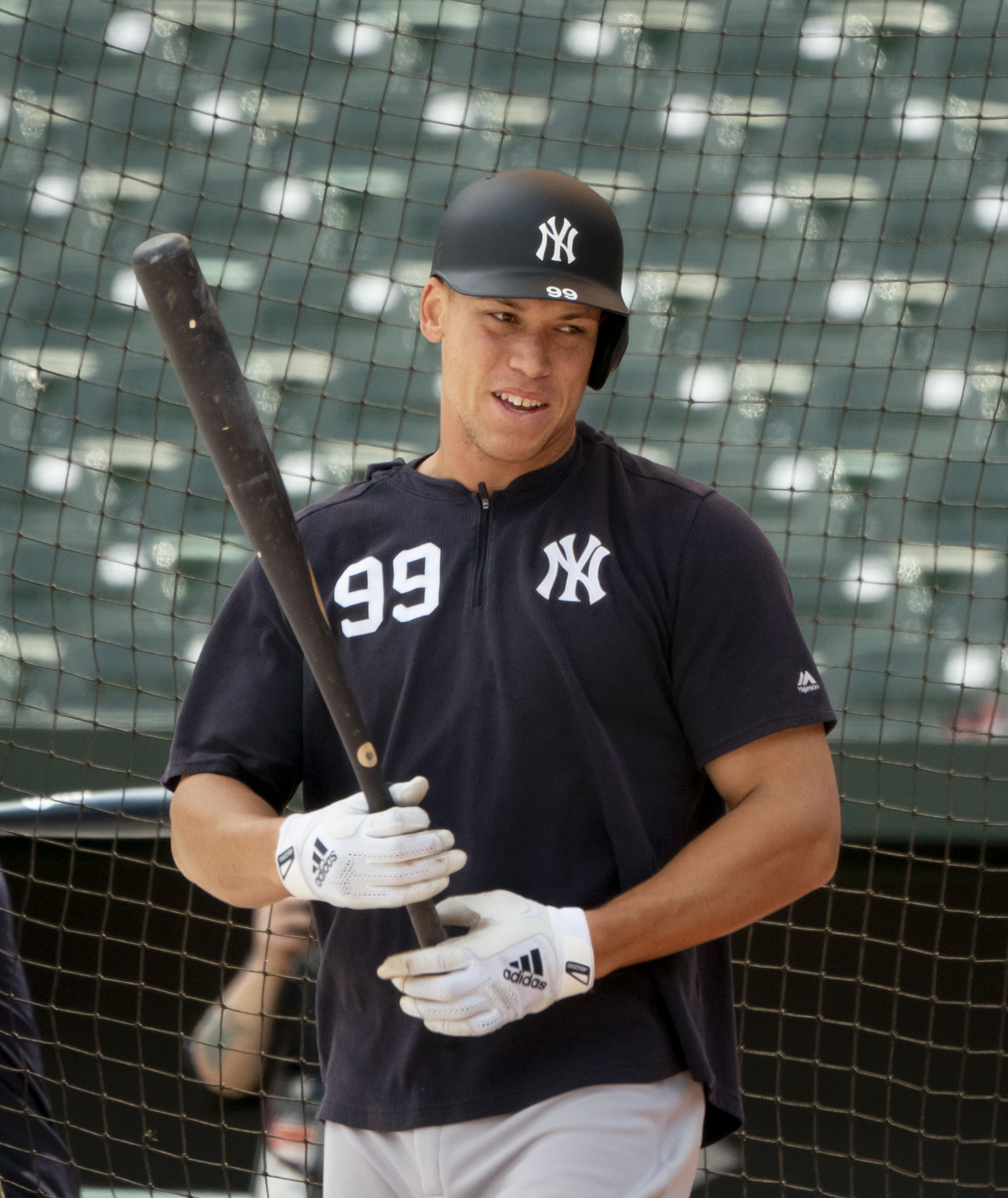
Aaron Judge quickly emerged as the new face of the franchise, earning multiple MVP honors and eventually being named team captain

The Yankees trades brought a group of players to the team, most notably, Cubs prospect Gleyber Torres. In discussing the midseason trades, Yankees general manager Brian Cashman said that the Yankees recognized the "need to look toward the future."

In early August, both Teixeira and Rodriguez revealed their plans to retire by the season's end. Rodriguez played his final game on August 12, 2016, accepting a front office job with the Yankees shortly after. In one of his final games, Teixeira hit a walk-off grand slam against the Boston Red Sox, his 409th and last career home run. The Yankees called up Tyler Austin and outfielder Aaron Judge in August. They made their debuts on August 13, hitting back-to-back home runs in their first career at-bats. Catcher Gary Sánchez hit 20 home runs in 53 games, finishing 2nd in AL Rookie of the Year voting and setting the record at the time as the fastest to reach 20 career home runs. Sanchez, Judge and Austin, as well as the Yankees' prosperous farm system in general, became nicknamed the "Baby Bombers".

In 2017, Judge led the American League with 52 home runs, breaking Mark McGwire's major league record for most home runs by a rookie in a single season (McGwire hit 49 in 1987). Judge won the 2017 Home Run Derby, making the Yankees the team with the most players in history to win a Home Run Derby. Judge would end the season by winning Rookie of the Year, and finishing second in the AL MVP voting.

In the 2017–18 off-season, the Yankees made a couple moves including hiring Aaron Boone to succeed Girardi as their new manager. and trading for reigning National League Most Valuable Player Giancarlo Stanton. A right fielder who bats right-handed, Stanton hit 59 home runs and drove in 132 runs—both major league highs—in 2017; his contract was the largest player contract in the history of professional sports in North America at the time.

In 2019 the Yankees traveled to London in late June to play the Red Sox in the first ever MLB London Series, in addition to the first MLB games played in Europe. The Yankees swept Boston in the two-game series, with the first game lasting 4 hours and 42 minutes, 3 minutes shorter than the longest MLB 9-inning game. The Yankees beat the Twins in a three-game sweep to advance to the ALCS for the second time in three seasons. However, on October 19, the Houston Astros beat the Yankees in the ALCS 4–2. With this loss, the 2010s decade became the first since the 1980s to have the Yankees fail to win a World Series and the first since the 1910s to have the Yankees failing to play in one. In addition, with the Mets losing the 2015 World Series, the 2010s decade also was the first decade since the 1910s in which there was no World Series champion in New York.

During the 2019 offseason, on December 18, 2019, the Yankees signed Gerrit Cole to a nine-year, $324 million contract.

On May 19, 2021, former Cy Young Award winner Corey Kluber threw a no-hitter against the Texas Rangers. This was the Yankees 12th no-hitter of all time, and the first since David Cone's perfect game in 1999. The Yankees also recorded a record-tying three triple plays throughout the 2021 season.

In 2022, the Yankees clinched their 30th straight winning season. On October 4, Aaron Judge hit his 62nd home run, breaking the American League single-season home run record set in 1961 by Roger Maris. In the offseason, Jose Trevino would become the first Yankee ever to win the Platinum Glove Award. Aaron Judge would also win AL MVP after having an historic season, being the first Yankee to win the award since Alex Rodriguez did in 2007.

On December 21, 2022, Aaron Judge was named the 16th captain in Yankees history, after getting resigned to a nine-year, $360 million contract. Judge was named the first captain of the team since Derek Jeter retired in 2014.

On June 28, 2023, Domingo Germán threw the 24th perfect game in MLB history, and fourth in Yankees history. After the 2023 season, shortstop Anthony Volpe became the first Yankee rookie to win the Gold Glove Award, and Gerrit Cole won the AL Cy Young Award after posting a league leading 2.63 ERA and 0.981 WHIP.

On December 6, 2023, the Yankees made a blockbuster trade for young superstar Juan Soto. The addition of Soto helped boost the Yankees to capturing their 21st AL East title and securing the top seed in the American League, just one season after missing the playoffs entirely. Throughout the 2024 season, Aaron Judge had an historic season once again, leading the MLB in most major offensive categories; while also hitting 50 or more homeruns in a season for the third time, making him one of five players in history to do so. In the ALCS the Yankees defeated the Cleveland Guardians in five games, with Soto delivering a game-clinching three-run home run in the 10th inning of Game Five. Giancarlo Stanton was named ALCS MVP, hitting four homeruns in the series. The Yankees won their 41st AL Pennant, and headed to the 2024 World Series to face the Los Angeles Dodgers. This marked the 12th time ever that the Yankees and Dodgers played each other in the World Series, which is an MLB record. The Yankees fell to the Dodgers in a tightly contested five-game series, marking their 14th World Series loss—tying the Dodgers for the most in MLB history. Despite close games, the Yankees struggled to capitalize on key moments, with Aaron Judge enduring a postseason slump, batting just .222 in the World Series. Following the season, Judge was announced as AL MVP for the second time in his career. This marks the 22nd Yankees MVP since the BBWAA began voting on the award in 1931, the most of any team. He won the award unanimously joining Mickey Mantle as the only other Yankee to do so.

During the 2025 season Judge continued to perform at a high level. He won the AL batting title with a .331 average and hit 53 home runs, en route to repeating as AL MVP, winning his third in four years.

== Distinctions ==
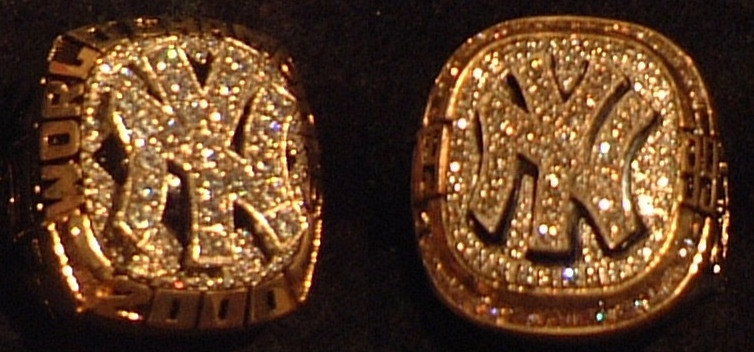
World Series rings

The Yankees have won 27 World Series in 41 appearances, the most in Major League Baseball in addition to major North American professional sports leagues. The St. Louis Cardinals are in second place with 11 World Series championships with their last win in 2011. The Dodgers are second in total World Series appearances with 22. The Yankees have lost 14 World Series which is tied for the most in MLB with the Dodgers. The Yankees have faced the Dodgers in 12 World Series, going 8–4 overall. Among North American major sports, the Yankees' success is approached by only the 24 Stanley Cup championships of the Montreal Canadiens of the National Hockey League. The Yankees have played in the World Series against every National League pennant winner except the Houston Astros (who now play in the American League), the Colorado Rockies, and the Washington Nationals.

Through 2025, the Yankees have an all-time regular season winning percentage of .569 (a 10,872 – 8,216 record), the best of any team in MLB history. On June 25, 2019, they set a new major league record for homering in 28 consecutive games, breaking the record set by the 2002 Texas Rangers. The streak would reach 31 games, during which they hit 57 home runs. With the walk-off solo home run by DJ LeMahieu to win the game against the Oakland Athletics on August 31, 2019, the Yankees ended the month of August that year now holding a new record of 74 home runs hit in the month alone, a new record for the most home runs hit in a month by a single MLB team.

== World Series championships ==
The Yankees have won a record 27 World Series championships. Their most recent one came when the new stadium opened in 2009; they defeated the Philadelphia Phillies in six games under manager Joe Girardi.

Season	Manager	Opponent	Series score	Record
1923	Miller Huggins	New York Giants	4–2	98–54
1927	Miller Huggins	Pittsburgh Pirates	4–0	110–44
1928	Miller Huggins	St. Louis Cardinals	4–0	101–53
1932	Joe McCarthy	Chicago Cubs	4–0	107–47
1936	Joe McCarthy	New York Giants	4–2	102–51
1937	Joe McCarthy	New York Giants	4–1	102–52
1938	Joe McCarthy	Chicago Cubs	4–0	99–53
1939	Joe McCarthy	Cincinnati Reds	4–0	106–45
1941	Joe McCarthy	Brooklyn Dodgers	4–1	101–53
1943	Joe McCarthy	St. Louis Cardinals	4–1	98–56
1947	Bucky Harris	Brooklyn Dodgers	4–3	97–57
1949	Casey Stengel	Brooklyn Dodgers	4–1	97–57
1950	Casey Stengel	Philadelphia Phillies	4–0	98–56
1951	Casey Stengel	New York Giants	4–2	98–56
1952	Casey Stengel	Brooklyn Dodgers	4–3	95–59
1953	Casey Stengel	Brooklyn Dodgers	4–2	99–51
1956	Casey Stengel	Brooklyn Dodgers	4–3	97–57
1958	Casey Stengel	Milwaukee Braves	4–3	92–62
1961	Ralph Houk	Cincinnati Reds	4–1	109–53
1962	Ralph Houk	San Francisco Giants	4–3	96–66
1977	Billy Martin	Los Angeles Dodgers	4–2	100–62
1978	Bob Lemon	Los Angeles Dodgers	4–2	100–63
1996	Joe Torre	Atlanta Braves	4–2	92–70
1998	Joe Torre	San Diego Padres	4–0	114–48
1999	Joe Torre	Atlanta Braves	4–0	98–64
2000	Joe Torre	New York Mets	4–1	87–74
2009	Joe Girardi	Philadelphia Phillies	4–2	103–59
Total World Series championships:				27

== Team nicknames ==
The team has acquired different nicknames over the years by both baseball personalities and the media. Sportswriter Fred Lieb, in a 1922 story for the Baseball Magazine, said he will call the club "the Yanks" in his articles. He stated the nickname "will fit into heads better". Their most prominently used nickname is "the Bronx Bombers" or simply "the Bombers", a reference to their home and their prolific hitting. The nickname "Bronx Bombers" was first used by writer Frank Wallace in a July 5, 1928, article in the New York Daily News. By 1935, the name had caught on among sportswriters around the country.

A less used nickname is "the Pinstripes" or "Pinstripers", in reference to the iconic feature on their home uniforms. The term "Murderers' Row" has historically been used to refer to both the 1920s Yankees and the team altogether. Critics often refer to the team and the organization as "the Evil Empire", a term applied to the Yankees by Boston Red Sox president Larry Lucchino in a 2002 interview with The New York Times after the Yankees signed pitching prospect José Contreras. Ironically, Yankee fans and supporters refer to their team as the "Evil Empire" as a badge of honor and in fact enjoy having their team play the villain. The team also embraced the label as well, with the stadium playing "The Imperial March" from Star Wars, the song associated with antagonist Darth Vader, at home games. A term from the team's tumultuous late 1970s, "the Bronx Zoo", is sometimes used by detractors, as well as the "Damn Yankees", after the musical of the same name.

== Logos and uniforms ==
The Yankees logo and uniform design has changed throughout the team's history. During the inaugural Highlanders season in 1903, the uniform featured a large "N" and a "Y" on each breast. In 1909, the "N" and "Y" were combined and was added to both the left breast and caps. According to history, the interlocking "NY" letters predates the New York Yankees. The letters appear on the New York City Police Department Medal for Valor, which was established in 1877 and was designed by Tiffany & Co. Three years later, black pinstripes were added to the Highlander uniforms for the first time. The current cap look, a navy blue hat with the white interlocking "NY" letters, was adopted in 1932. Both the home and away uniforms has been relatively unchanged since the 1920s and 1940s, respectively. The away uniform is grey in color with "NEW YORK" across the chest.

Primary logo

Cap insignia

Jersey insignia

Print insignia (Note: Featured prominently in marketing, is painted behind home plate at the Stadium, and appears on the team’s batting helmets.)

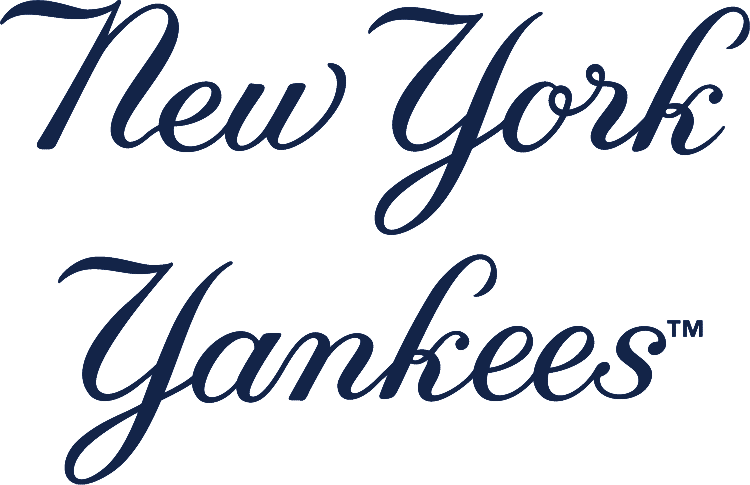
Wordmark logo

Merchandise with the Yankees logo, such as baseball caps, is popular worldwide, including in countries where the sport of baseball is not popular. According to a 2023 New York Times report, for instance, Yankees caps (mostly counterfeit) are "viral" in Brazil. Customers there mostly do not know that the logo represents a baseball team, but think of it as "a classic piece of Americana, a status symbol, or a generic—perhaps chic—emblem of the West".

== Popularity ==
=== Fan support ===
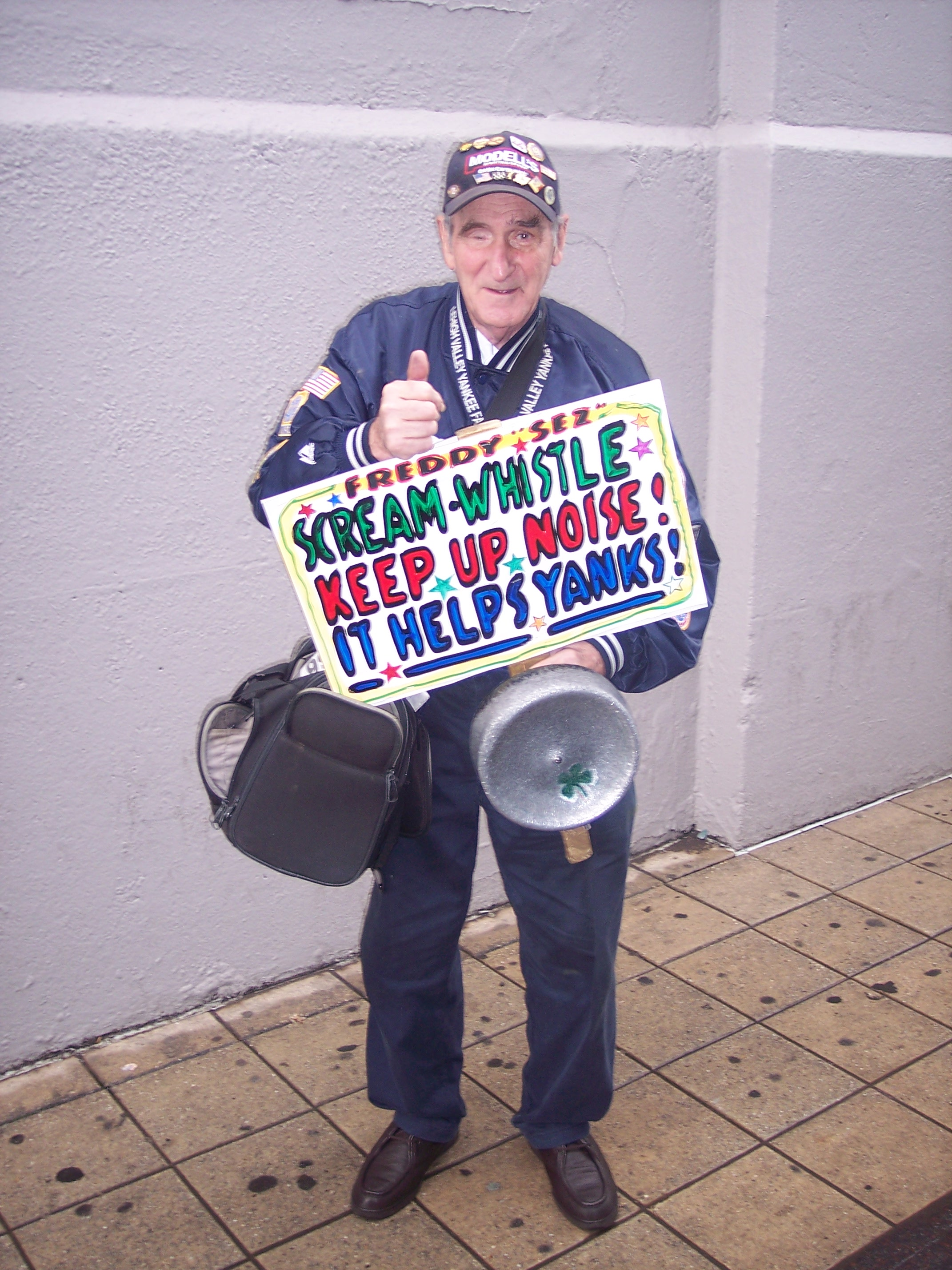
"Freddy Sez" holding one of his signs near the bleachers entrance before a game between the Yankees and the Texas Rangers

With their recurring success since the 1920s, the Yankees have since been one of the most popular teams in the world, with their fan base coming from much further than the New York metropolitan area. The Yankees typically bring an upsurge in attendance at all or most of their various road-trip venues, drawing crowds of their own fans, as well as home-town fans whose interest is heightened when the Yankees come to town.

The Yankees have consistently been the most attended MLB games. The first 1 million-fan season was in 1920, when more than 1.2 million fans attended Yankee games at the Polo Grounds. According to Baseball-Reference.com, the 2008 season saw the most fans per game in Yankees history, with an average of 53,000 per game. In the past seven years, the Yankees have drawn over three million fans each year, with an American League record-setting 4,090,696 in 2005, becoming only the third franchise in sports history to draw over four million in regular-season attendance in their own ballpark. The Yankees were the league leaders in "road attendance" each year from 2001 through 2006.

Some Yankees superfans have become notable in their own right. One famous fan was Freddy Schuman, popularly known as "Freddy Sez." For over 50 years, he came to the Yankees' home games with a baseball cap, a Yankees' jersey (which on the back bears his own name), and a cake pan with a shamrock painted on it, which was connected to a sign inscribed with words of encouragement for the home team. Schuman died on October 17, 2010, at the age of 85. The popularity of the Yankees also extended internationally. According to a Major League Baseball executive, the Yankees logo is considered a "sign of quality" despite many people not knowing the team.

=== The Bleacher Creatures ===
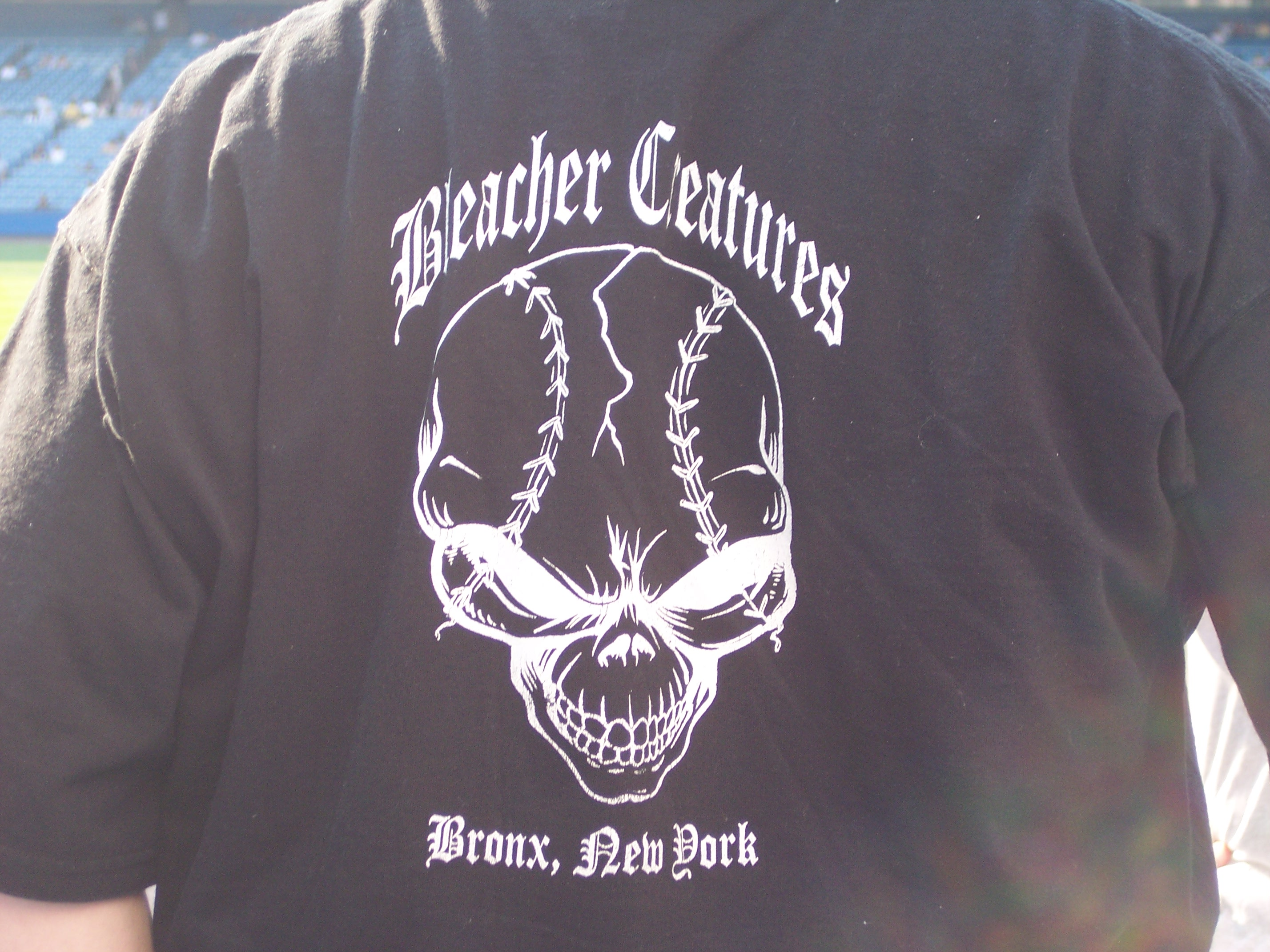
A shirt worn by a number of Bleacher Creatures

The "Bleacher Creatures" are a group of fans known for their strict allegiance to the Yankees and are often merciless to opposing fans who sit in the section and cheer for the road team. They occupied Section 39 in the right-field bleachers at the old Yankee Stadium and occupy Section 203 in the new stadium. The Bleacher Creatures are known for their use of chants and songs, with the "roll call" at the beginning of each home game being the most prominent.

The "creatures" got their nickname from New York Daily News columnist Filip "Flip" Bondy, who spent the 2004 season sitting in the section for research on his book about the group, Bleeding Pinstripes: A Season with the Bleacher Creatures of Yankee Stadium, published in 2005. Throughout the years both at the old and new stadiums, the Bleacher Creatures have attracted controversy for the use of derogatory and homophobic chants and rowdiness aimed at both opposing fans and players.

=== The Judge's Chambers at Yankee Stadium ===
In 2017, team management ordered the creation of a special cheer section in Section 104, "the Judge's Chambers", for fans of Yankees outfielder Aaron Judge, a young superstar. They were the second AL team to create a special cheering section, after the Seattle Mariners' "King's Court" for pitcher Félix Hernández. The section's 18 seats are given to ticketholders and their families, along with black judicial robes with the team logo on the front and Judge's 99 jersey number on the back; before the addition of the section, fans were wearing white wigs and judicial robes to games. Occasionally, community organizations, charities and Little League teams are given precedence when selecting participants. The seats, which are close to his position in right field, are surrounded by mahogany wood to emulate the appearance of the city's courthouses.

=== Team ownership ===
The Yankees baseball club is owned by Yankee Global Enterprises, a holding company in turn majorly owned by the Steinbrenner family. Yankee Global Enterprises also has a majority stake in the YES Network, the Yankees main television network. Since purchasing the team from CBS in 1973, George Steinbrenner was involved in daily team operations, including player and manager signings. Steinbrenner retired from day-to-day team operations in 2005, handing over control to Steve Swindal, his then son-in-law. Swindal was bought out in 2007 with George's son Hal Steinbrenner becoming chairman of Yankee Global Enterprises and the team's managing partner. George Steinbrenner, citing declining health, formally handed control of the team to both Hal and brother Hank in October 2007. George Steinbrenner died in 2010 and Hank died ten years later, leaving Hal as the main managing partner. In 2008, the Yankees announced a joint venture with the National Football League's Dallas Cowboys to form the basis for a partnership in running food and beverage, and other catering services to both teams' stadiums.

The Yankees has consistently been one of the most valuable sport teams in the world. In 2013, Forbes magazine ranked New York Yankees as the fourth most valuable sports team in the world, behind association football clubs Real Madrid of La Liga, Manchester United of the Premier League and Barcelona of La Liga, a value of $2.3 billion. In 2017, Forbes magazine ranked the Yankees as the second most valuable sports team at $3.7 billion behind the Dallas Cowboys, up 9% from 2016. In 2019, Forbes magazine again ranked the Yankees as the most valuable MLB team at $4.6 billion, up 15% from 2018, behind only the Dallas Cowboys. In 2022, the Yankees were again ranked as the second most valuable team behind the Cowboys, valued at $6 billion. The team's value rose again in 2023, rising 17% from 2022 to $7.1 billion, and keeping the Yankees as the second most valuable sports team in the world behind the Cowboys. In 2024 the team's value rose to $7.55 billion, but the team fell to fourth overall in the ranking with the Golden State Warriors and Los Angeles Rams passing the Yankees. In 2025, the team's value rose to $8.2 billion, but the team fell to tenth overall in the ranking as several teams surpassed the Yankees.

=== Criticism ===
With the long-term success of the franchise and a large Yankee fanbase, many fans of other teams have come to dislike the Yankees. When the Yankees are on the road, it is common for the home fans to chant "Yankees Suck". According to the opinion poll and analytics website FiveThirtyEight, the Yankees were MLB's least liked team, with 48% of fans expressing an "unfavorable" view of the team.

Much of the animosity toward the team may derive from its high payroll and perceptions that it "buys" champions instead of developing players. Their payroll was around $200 million at the start of the 2008 season, the highest of any American sports team. In 2005, the team's average player salary was $2.6 million with the Yankees having the five highest paid players in MLB. During his tenure as team owner, George Steinbrenner attracted controversy for his public criticism of players and managers and for high personnel turnover. Manager Billy Martin was hired and fired a total of five times under Steinbrenner. Chicago Tribune columnist Mike Royko noted, "Hating the Yankees is as American as pizza pie, unwed mothers, and cheating on your income tax."

== Fight and theme songs ==
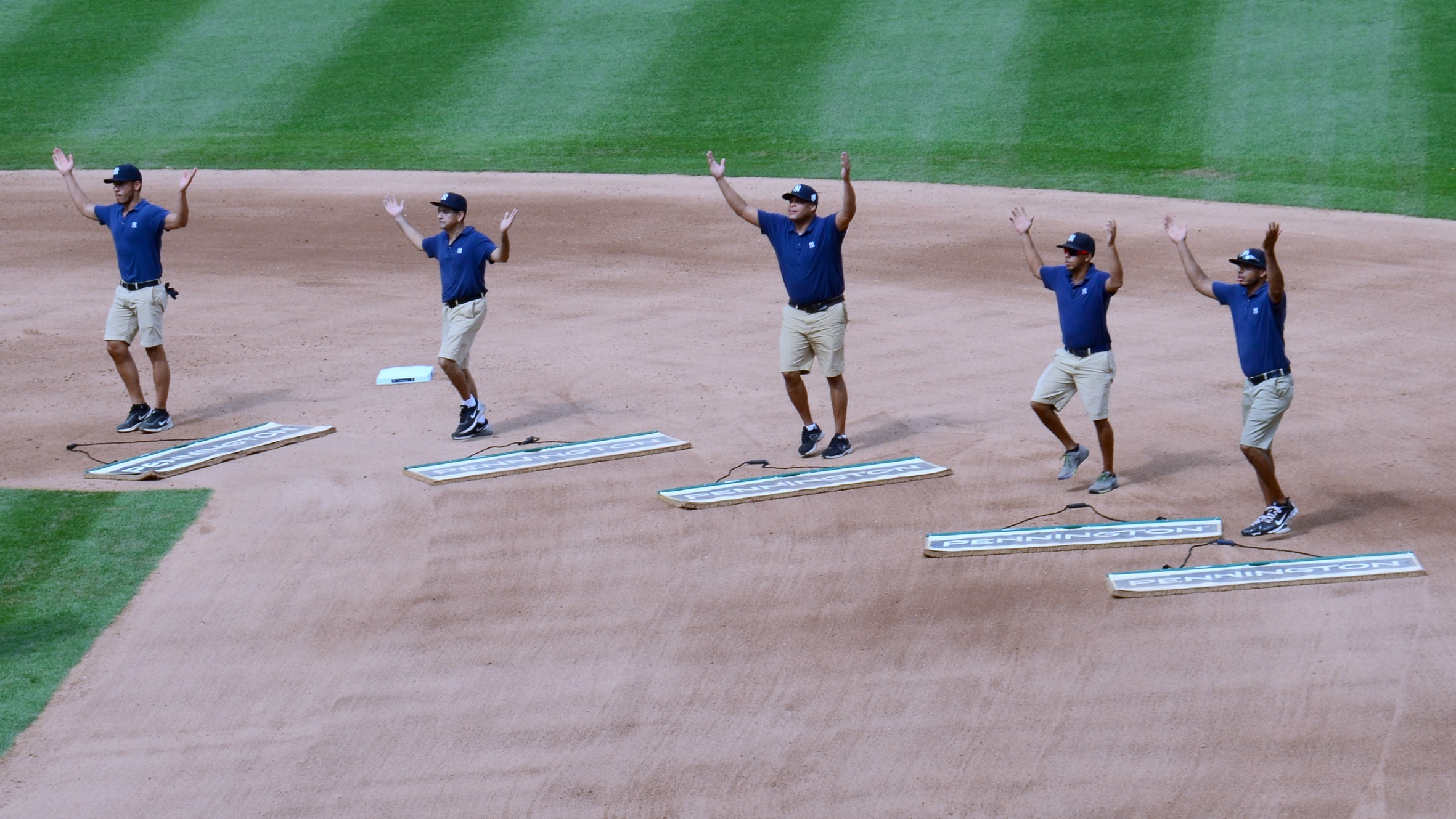
The grounds crew at Yankee Stadium dancing to "Y.M.C.A."

The official fight song for the Yankees is "Here Come the Yankees", written in 1967 by Bob Bundin and Lou Stallman. The song was used extensively in radio and television broadcast introductions. The song, however, did not catch on with fans and has been rarely used past the 1990s. This is contrasted to other, more popular fight songs such as "Meet the Mets", which is played at every Mets home game. Another song strongly linked to the team is "New York, New York", which is played in the stadium after home games. George Steinbrenner started having the song played during the 1980 season. The Frank Sinatra cover version was traditionally played after victories, and the Liza Minnelli original version after losses. However, due to a complaint from Minnelli, the Yankees began playing the Frank Sinatra version after all home games, regardless of the result. Starting in the 2025 season, the team stopped playing the song after losses, instead choosing a rotation of other songs from Sinatra including "That's Life." This change was made after fans criticized the song being played following their 2024 World Series loss at home. The song was also played following their 2003 World Series loss at home.

A wide selection of songs are played regularly at the stadium, many of them live on the Stadium's Hammond organ. One of the popular songs is "God Bless America", which has been played during the seventh-inning stretch since September 11. The version typically played for many years since 2001 was an abbreviated version of Kate Smith's rendition. In 2019 the Yankees stopped playing Smith's rendition to allegations of racism in some of her songs. The team switched to a live version by the stadium organist during the stretch in the interim. In 2021, the organ version was replaced by a recording of the Robert Merrill cover of the song. Merrill was the national anthem singer in the old Yankees Stadium for Opening Day and other special events before dying in 1998. During the 5th inning, the grounds crew grooms the field while the Village People song "Y.M.C.A." plays. During the song's chorus, the crew members stop working and do the "YMCA" poses. Former Yankees executive Joseph Molloy said that he saw fans dancing to the song during a spring training game in the mid-1990s. Molloy told Steinbrenner, who started to play the song at the stadium.

== Radio and television ==
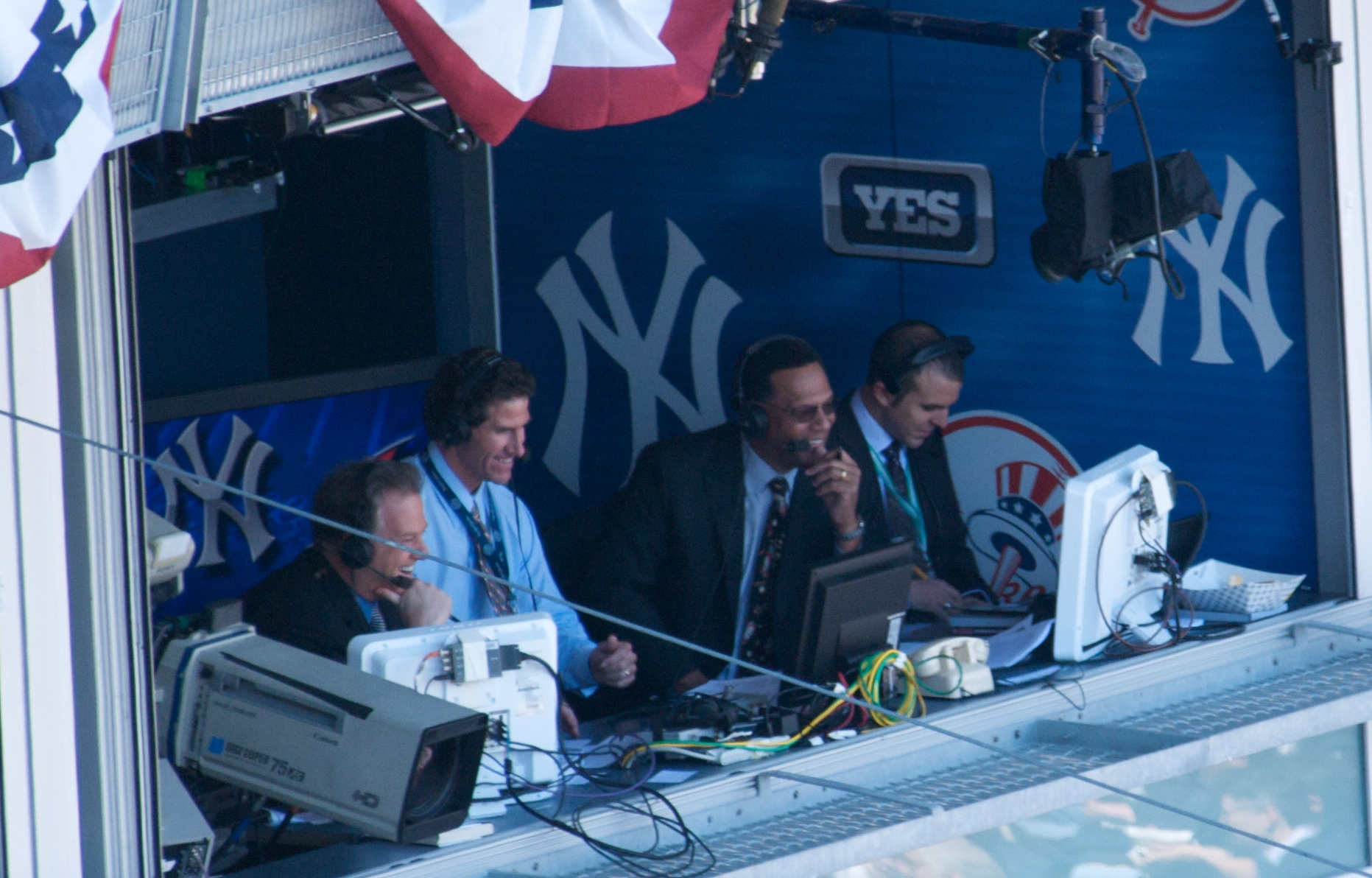
Announcers Michael Kay, Paul O'Neill, Ken Singleton, and Ryan Ruocco in the YES Network broadcast booth at Yankee Stadium in 2009

The Yankees Entertainment and Sports (YES) Network was launched in 2002 and serves as the primary home of the New York Yankees. As of 2026, Michael Kay is the play-by-play announcer with David Cone, Joe Girardi, and Paul O'Neill working as commentators as part of a three-man, or occasionally two-man, booth. Bob Lorenz hosts both the pre-game and the post-game shows with Jack Curry, and Meredith Marakovits and Nancy Newman are the on-site reporters. Select games are available streaming only on Amazon Prime in the New York metropolitan area; these games formerly aired on WPIX and WWOR-TV. Radio broadcasts are on the Yankees Radio Network, the flagship station being WFAN 660 AM, with Dave Sims as the play-by-play announcer and Suzyn Waldman providing the commentary. Spanish-language broadcasts are on WADO 1280 AM, with Rickie Ricardo calling the games.

=== Past announcers ===
- Mel Allen was the team's lead announcer from 1948 to 1964. He was known as "The voice of the Yankees." Later in his career, he became the iconic host of This Week in Baseball.
- Russ Hodges had a brief stint with Mel Allen before he took over as the lead announcer with the New York Giants.
- Red Barber called Yankees games for 13 seasons, from 1954 to 1966.
- Jerry Coleman called Yankees games from 1963 to 1970. Coleman was the Yankees second baseman from 1949 to 1957.
- Joe Garagiola called Yankees games from 1965 to 1967.
- Frank Messer, Phil Rizzuto and Bill White teamed together in the 1970s and 1980s. Rizzuto, with 40 years in the broadcast booth, was the longest-serving broadcaster in the history of the club. Messer and White each worked nearly two decades for the Yankees, with White notably moving on to become president of the National League in 1989.
- Bobby Murcer also called games for over twenty years, and continued with the YES Network until shortly before his death from brain cancer in 2008.
- John Sterling called Yankees games on radio from 1989 to 2024, and also hosted select team-related programs on the YES Network.

== Personnel ==
=== Active roster ===
New York Yankees 2027 spring training roster
40-man roster		Non-roster invitees	Coaches / other
**Pitchers**: 89 Brendan Beck; 53 David Bednar; -- Kyle Carr; 74 Kervin Castro; 57 Angel Chivilli; 45 Gerrit Cole; 73 Yerry De Los Santos; 54 Max Fried; -- Chase Hampton; 93 Bradley Hanner; 47 Brent Headrick; -- Carlos Lagrange; 55 Carlos Rodón; 71 Elmer Rodríguez; 36 Clarke Schmidt; 31 Cam Schlittler; 29 Will Warren; 40 Ryan Weathers	**Catchers**: 25 J. C. Escarra; 39 Ali Sánchez; 28 Austin Wells; **Infielders**: 72 José Caballero; 26 Luis García Jr.; 96 George Lombard Jr.; -- Marco Luciano; 19 Ryan McMahon; 11 Anthony Volpe; **Outfielders**: 35 Cody Bellinger; 24 Jasson Domínguez; 78 Spencer Jones; 99 Aaron Judge; -- Garrett Martin; 34 Heliot Ramos; 30 Max Schuemann; **Designated hitters**: 22 Ben Rice; 27 Giancarlo Stanton	**Outfielders**: -- Allan Castro	**Manager**: 17 Aaron Boone; **Coaches**: 77 Matt Blake (pitching); 79 Preston Claiborne (bullpen/assistant pitching); -- Rainiero Coa (bullpen catcher); 83 Desi Druschel (assistant pitching); 78 Casey Dykes (assistant hitting); 85 Dan Fiorito (first base/infield); 84 Jake Hirst (assistant hitting); 67 Luis Rojas (third base/outfield); -- Peter Serruto (bullpen catcher); -- Aaron Gershenfeld (field coordinator/catching); Vacant (hitting); Vacant (bench); 36 active, 0 inactive, 1 non-roster invitees; 7-, 10-, or 15-day injured list; * Not on active roster; ^{†} Suspended list; Roster, coaches, and NRIs updated November 20, 2026; Transactions • Depth chart; → All MLB rosters

=== Retired numbers ===
The Yankees have retired 23 numbers for 25 individuals, the most in Major League Baseball.

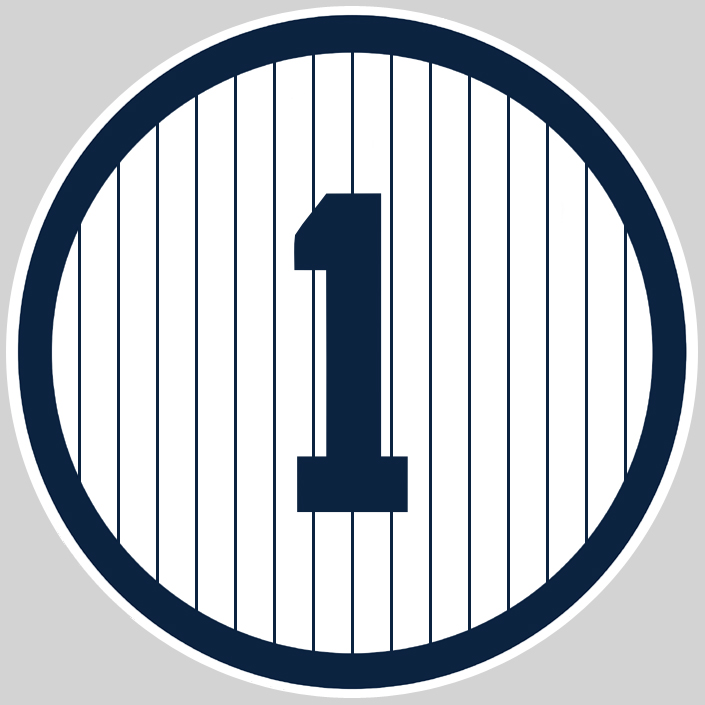
Billy
Martin
2B, M
Retired
August 10, 1986
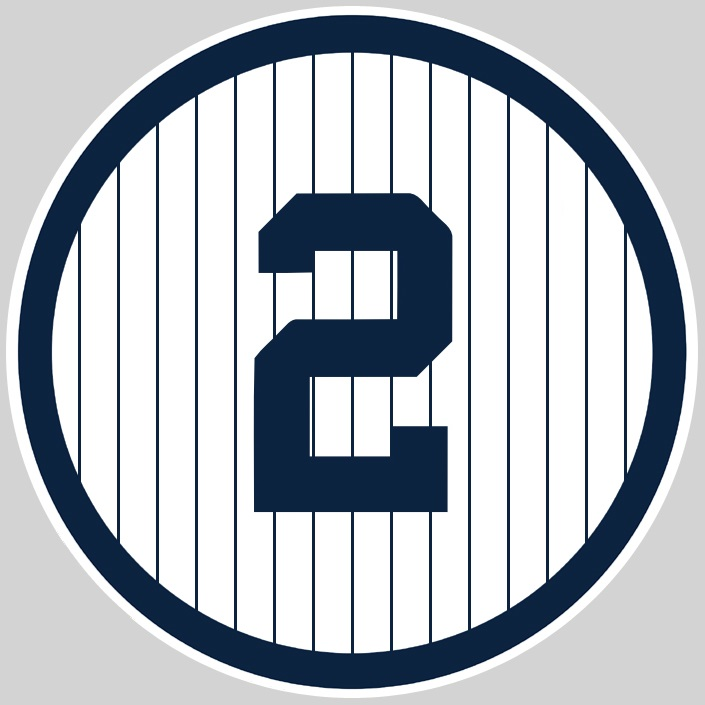
Derek
Jeter
SS
Retired
May 14, 2017
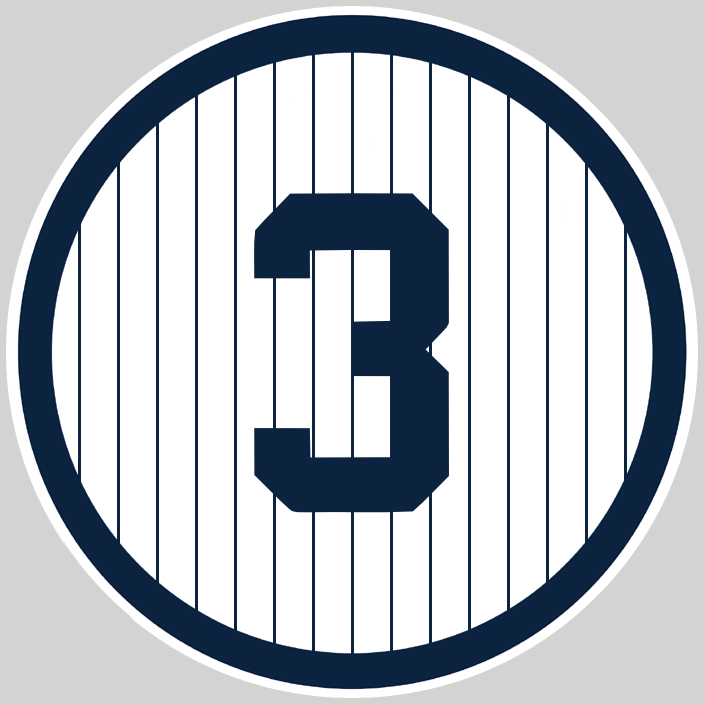
Babe
Ruth
RF
Retired
June 13, 1948
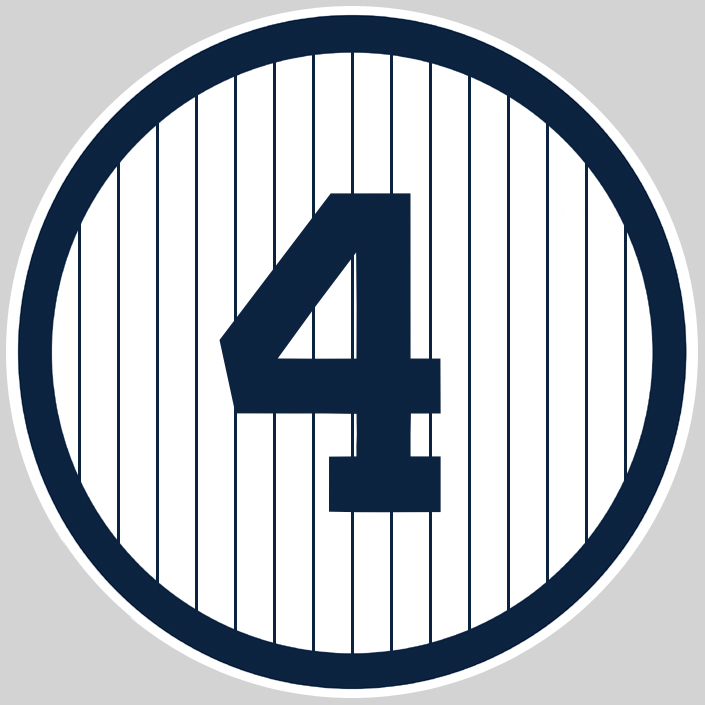
Lou
Gehrig
1B
Retired
July 4, 1939
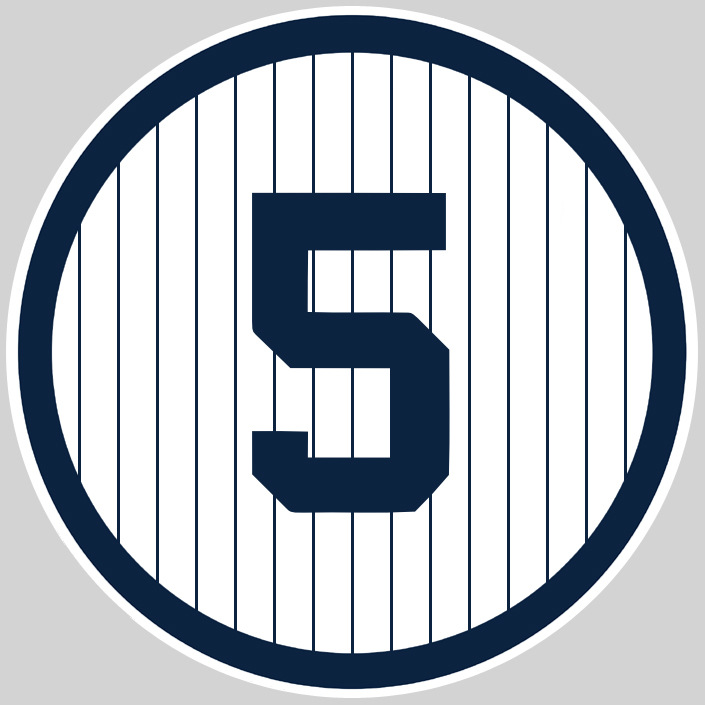
Joe
DiMaggio
CF
Retired
April 18, 1952
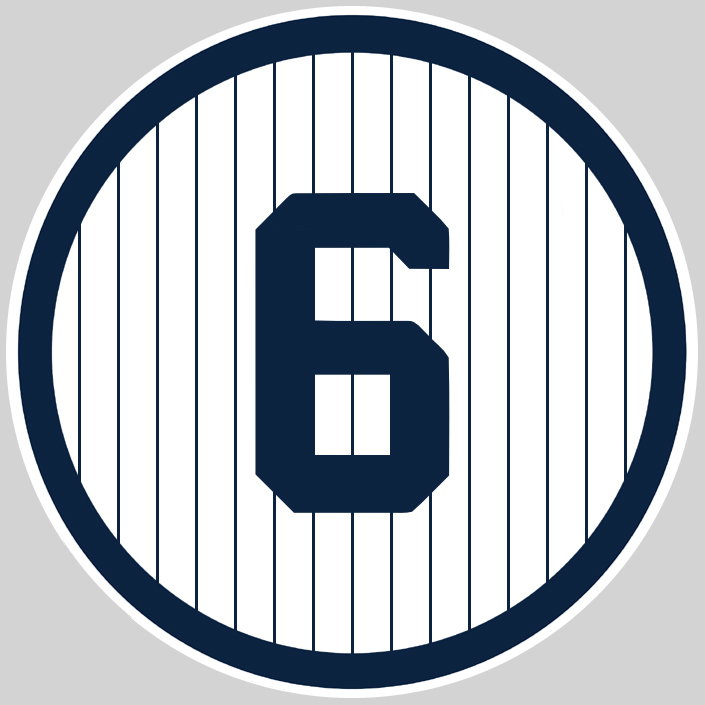
Joe
Torre
M
Retired
August 23, 2014
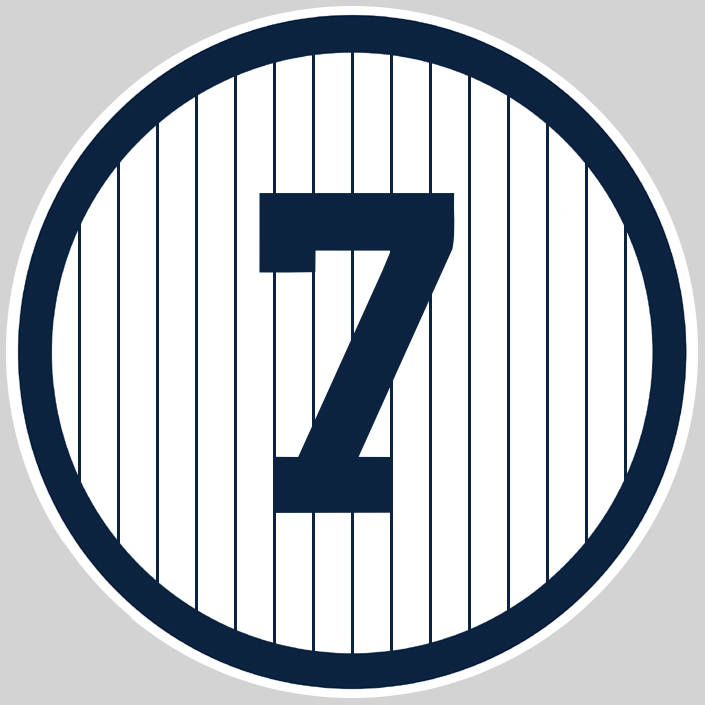
Mickey
Mantle
CF, Coach
Retired
June 8, 1969
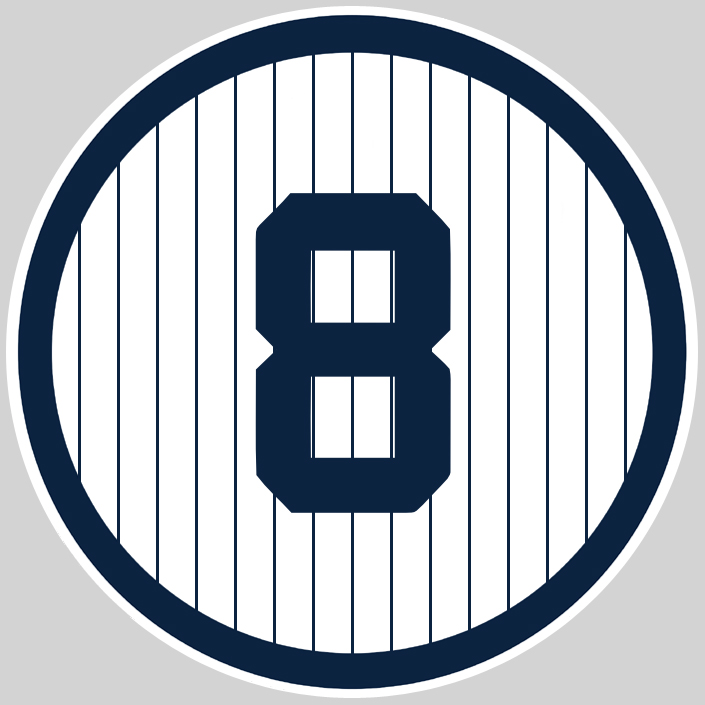
Bill
Dickey
C, M, Coach
Retired
July 22, 1972
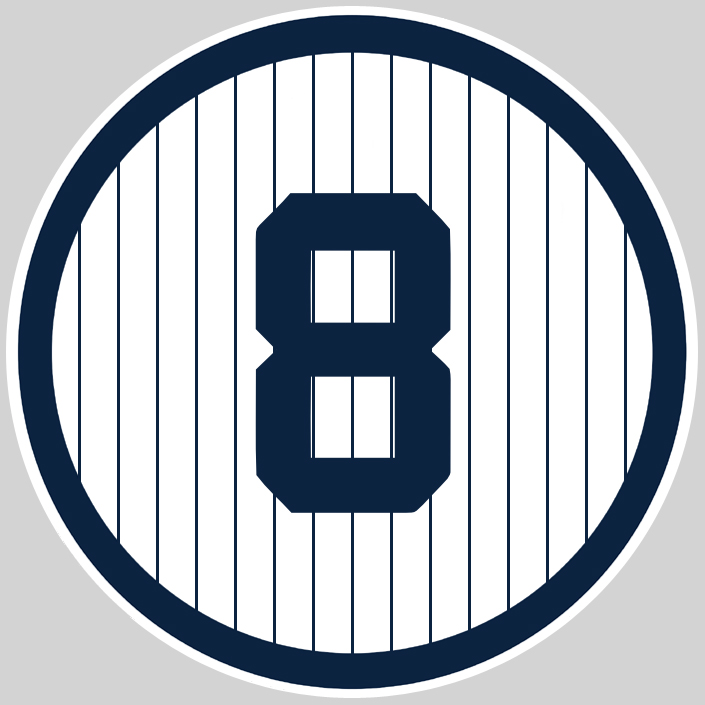
Yogi
Berra
C, M, Coach
Retired
July 22, 1972
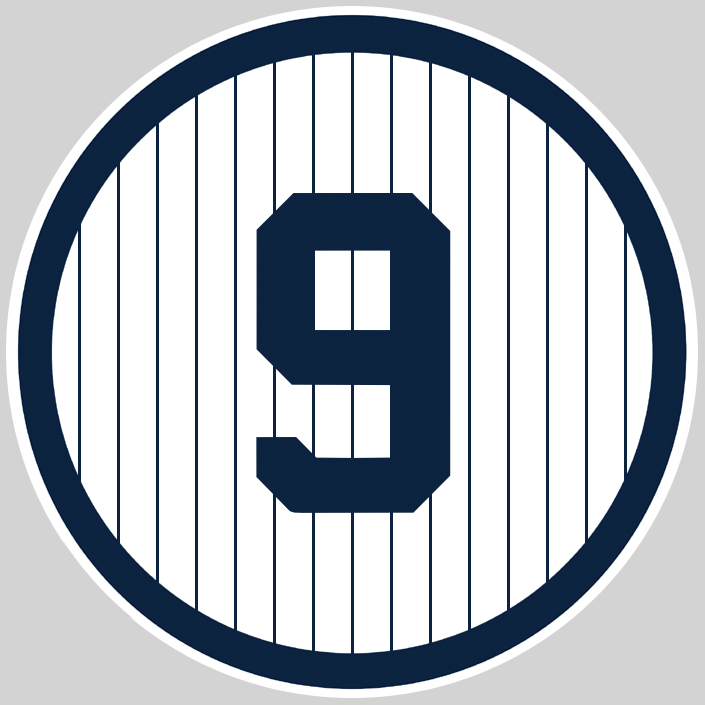
Roger
Maris
RF
Retired
July 21, 1984
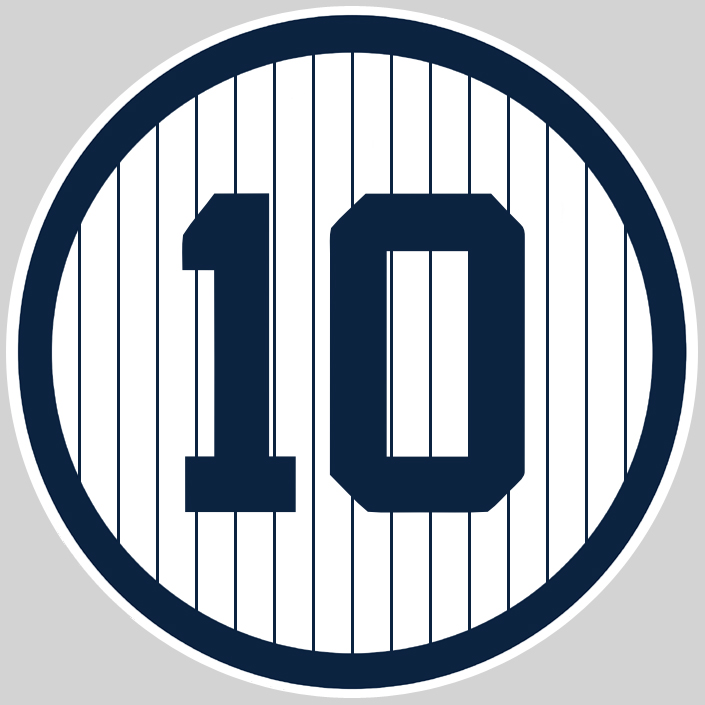
Phil
Rizzuto
SS
Retired
August 4, 1985
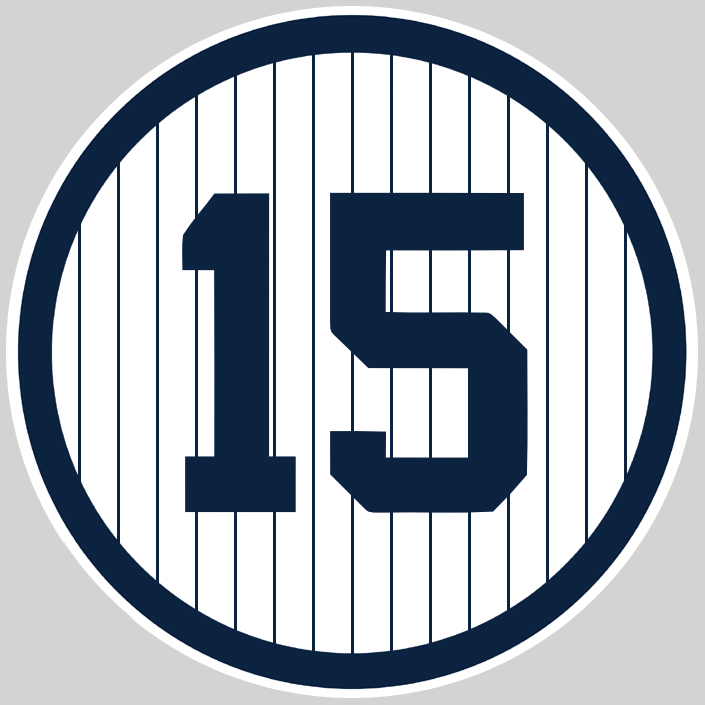
Thurman
Munson
C
Retired
August 3, 1979
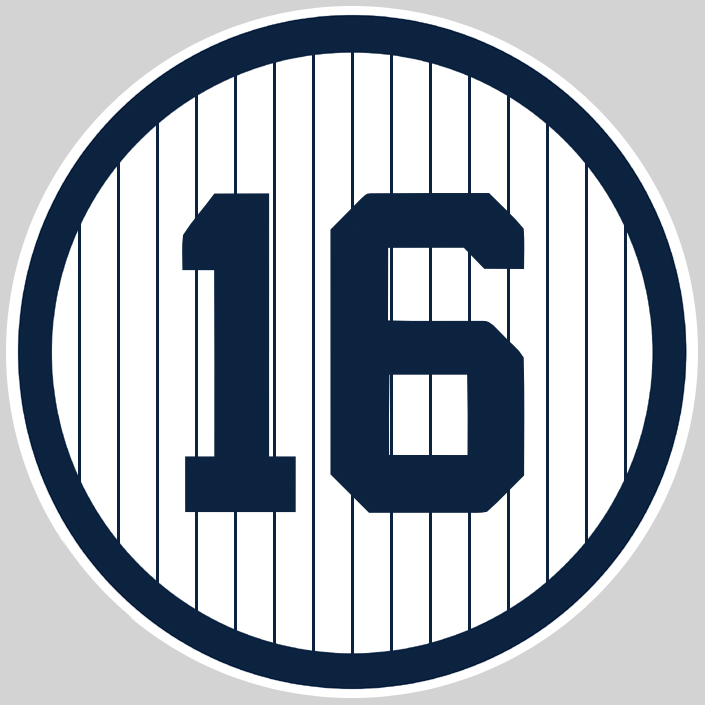
Whitey
Ford
SP, Coach
Retired
August 3, 1974
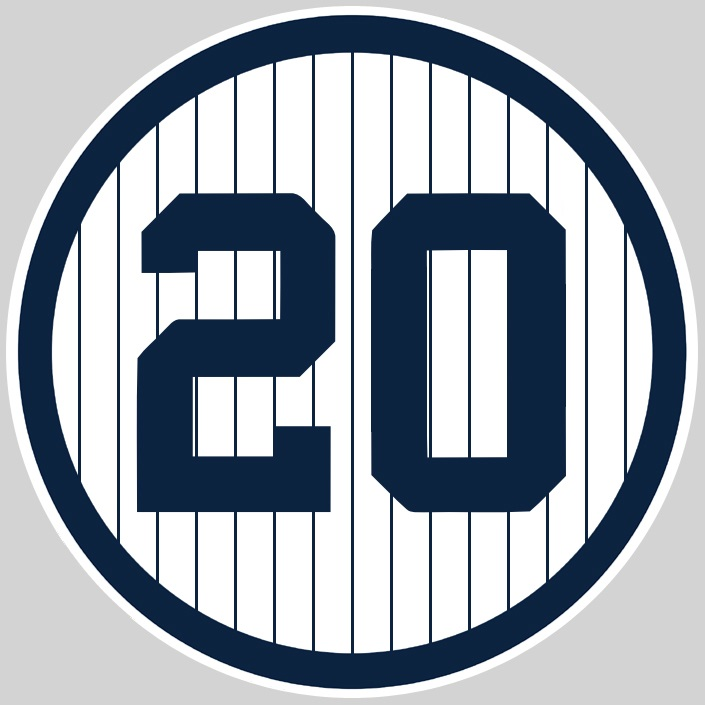
Jorge
Posada
C
Retired
August 22, 2015
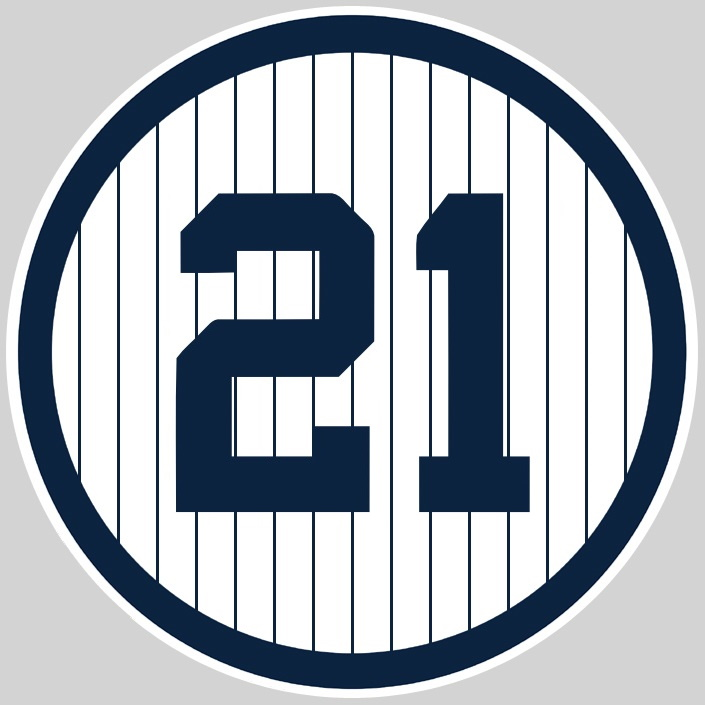
Paul
O'Neill
RF
Retired
August 21, 2022
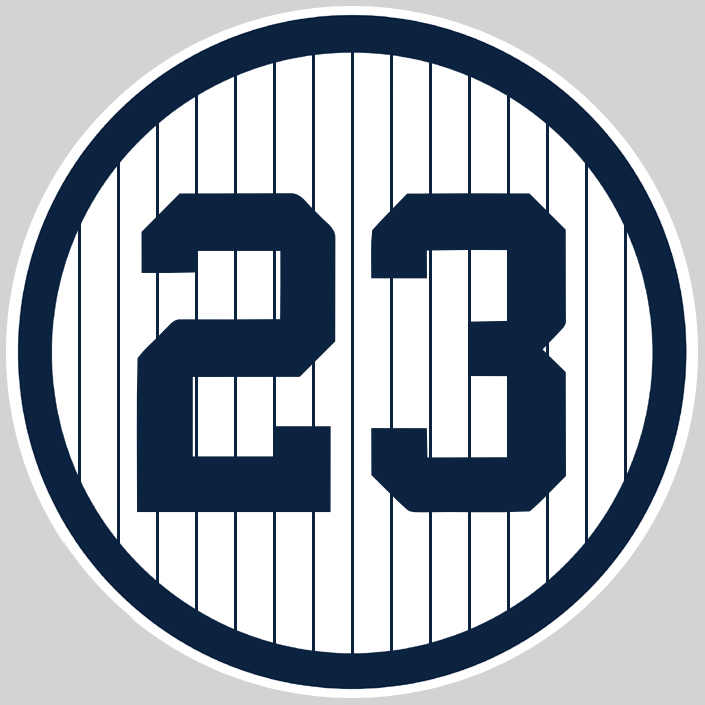
Don
Mattingly
1B, Coach
Retired
August 31, 1997
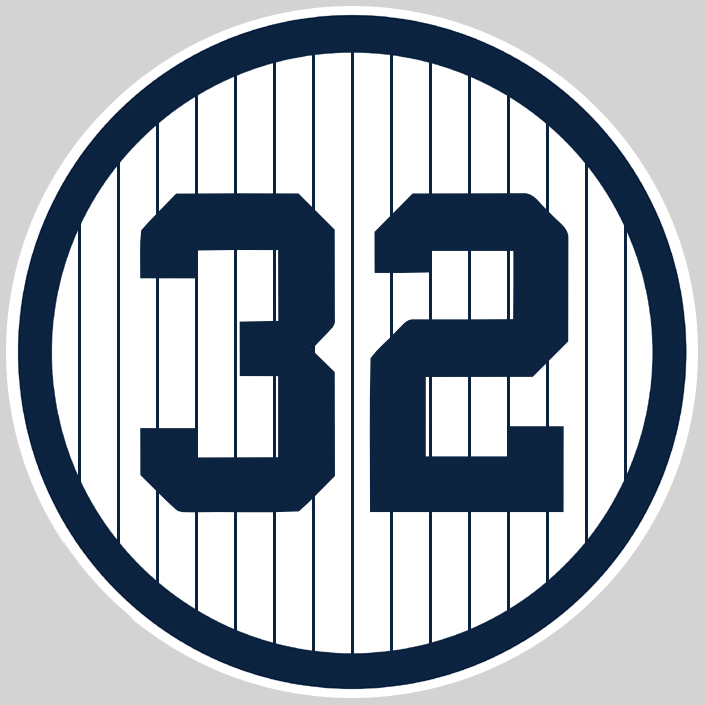
Elston
Howard
C, Coach
Retired
July 21, 1984
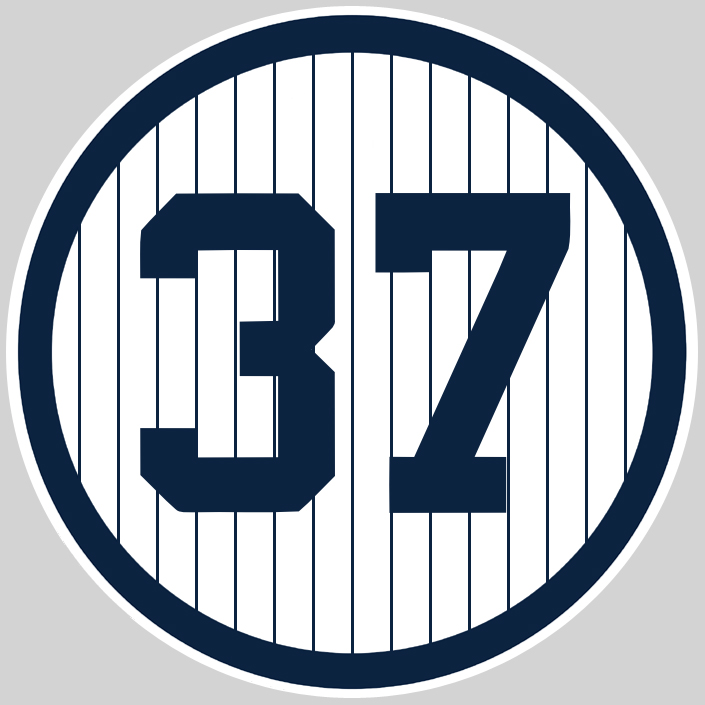
Casey
Stengel
M
Retired
August 8, 1970
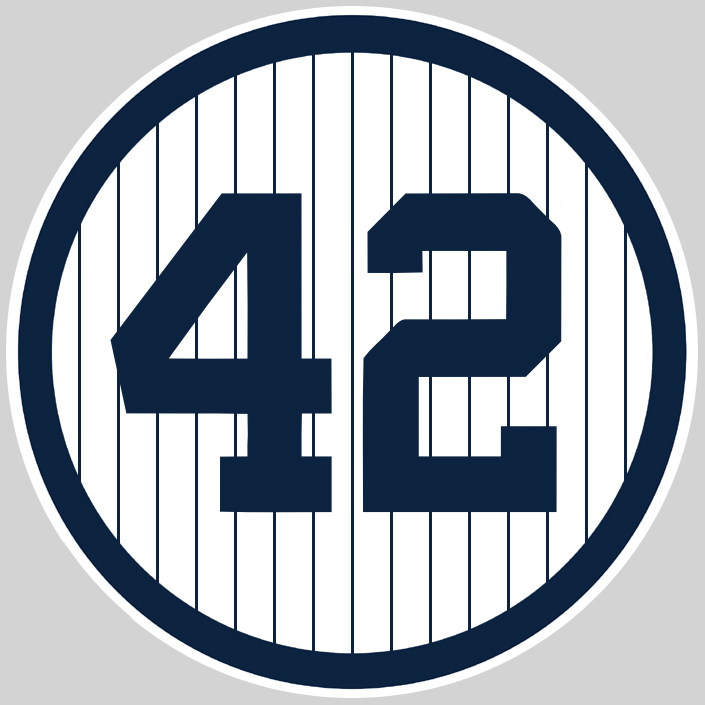
Mariano
Rivera
CP
Retired
September 22, 2013
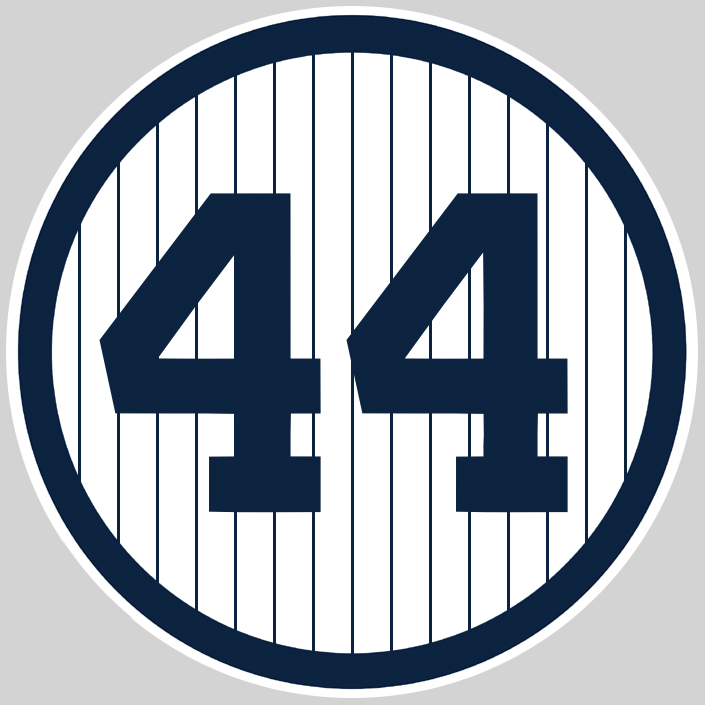
Reggie
Jackson
RF
Retired
August 14, 1993
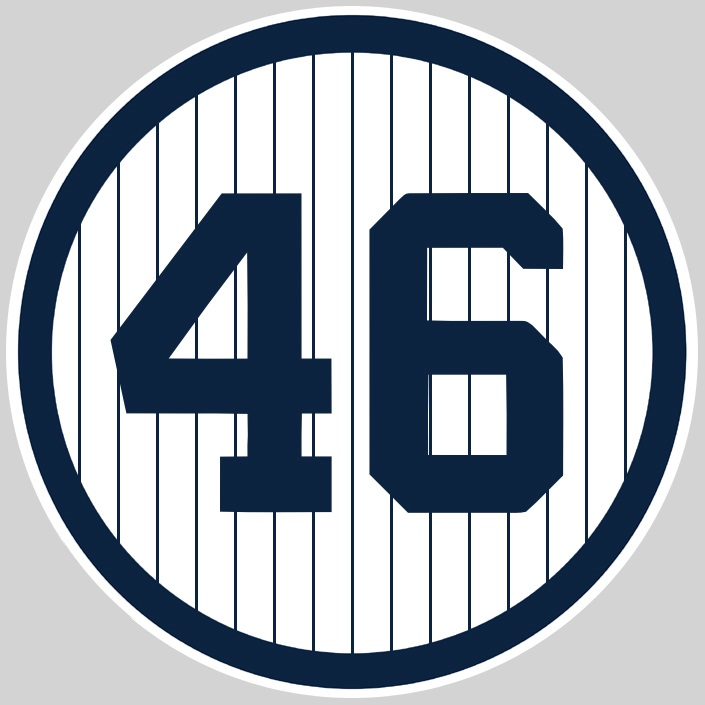
Andy
Pettitte
SP
Retired
August 23, 2015
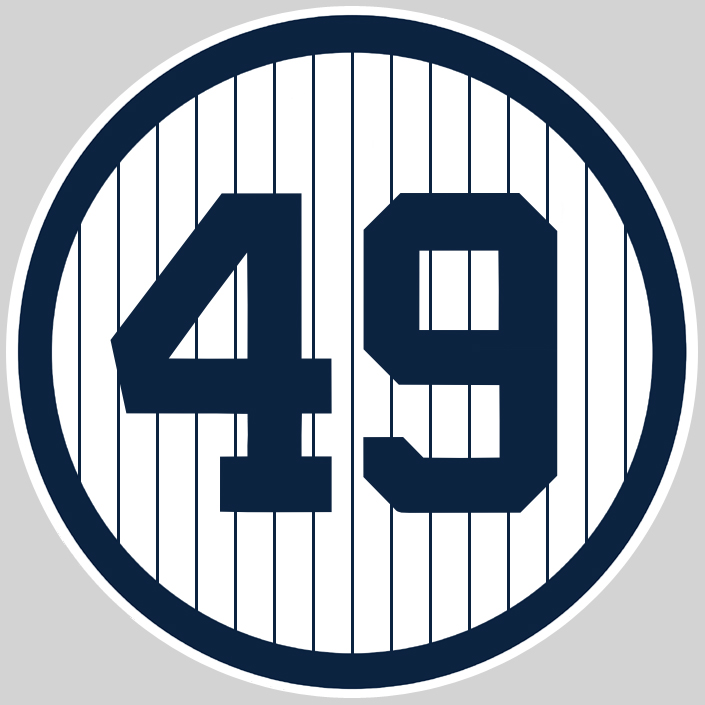
Ron
Guidry
SP, Coach
Retired
August 23, 2003
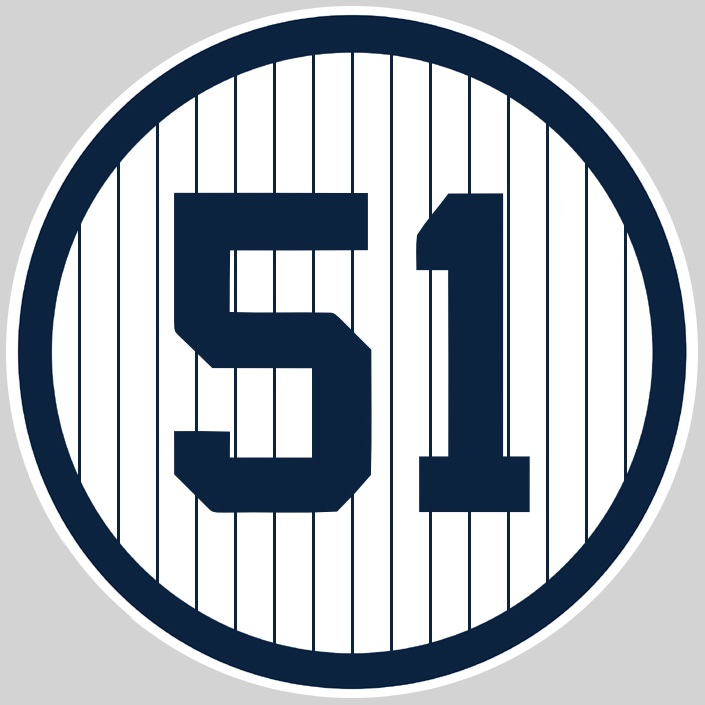
Bernie
Williams
CF
Retired
May 24, 2015
CC
Sabathia
SP
Retired
September 25, 2026
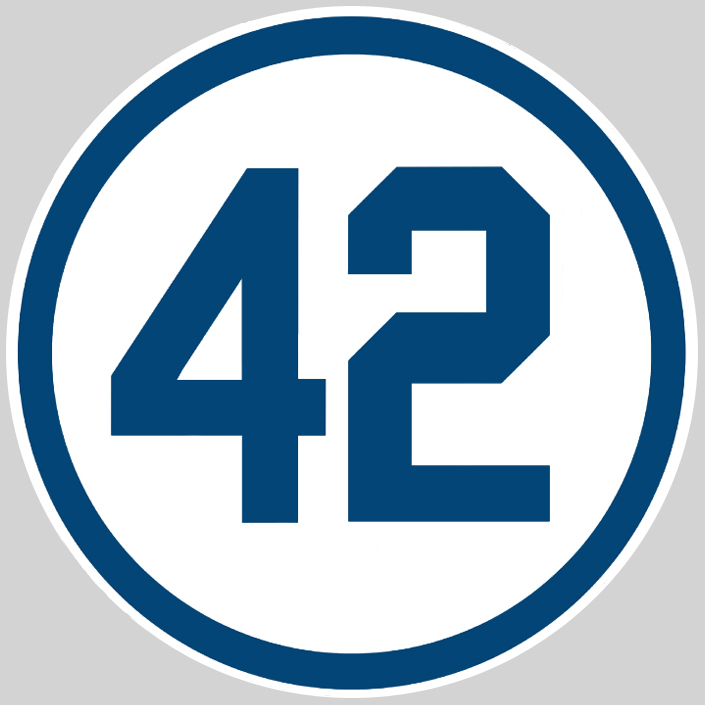
Jackie
Robinson
All MLB
Honored
April 15, 1997
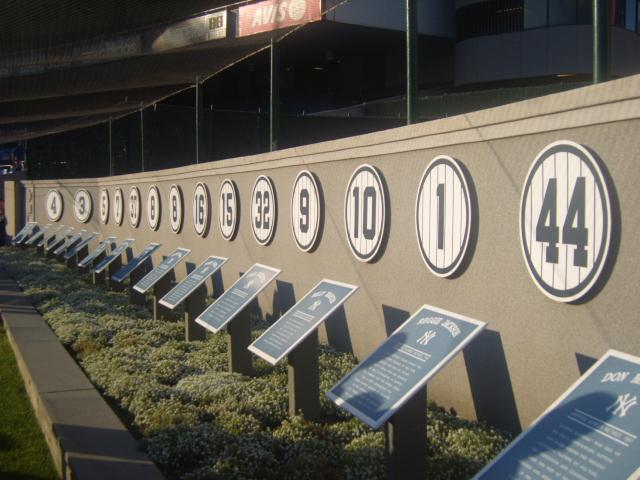
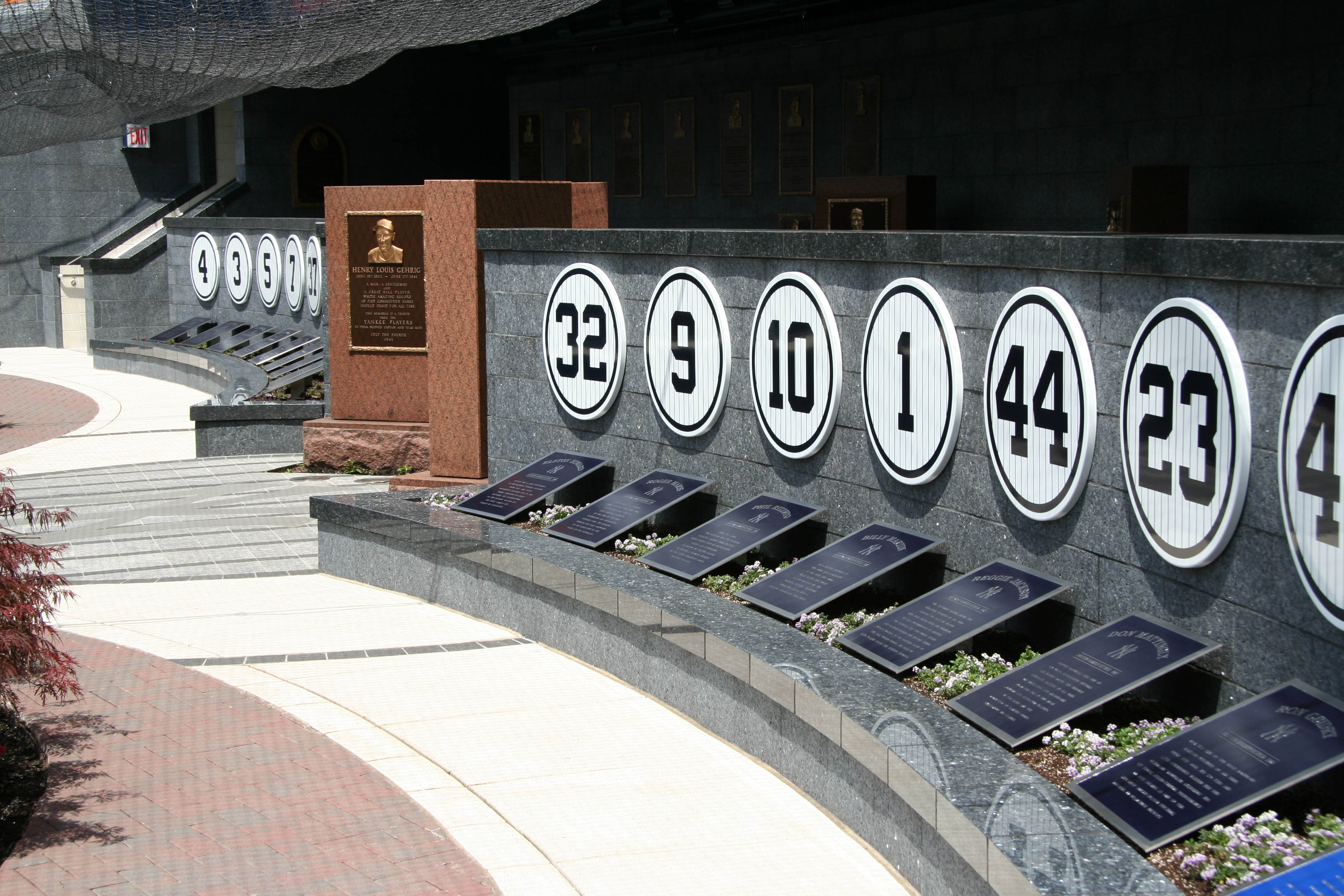
The row of retired numbers at the old stadium (top) and new stadium.

The retired numbers were displayed behind the old Yankee Stadium's left-field fence and in front of the opposing team's bullpen, forming a little alley that connects Monument Park to the left-field stands. When the franchise moved across the street to the new stadium, the numbers were incorporated into Monument Park that sits in center field between both bullpens. The 21 numbers are placed on the wall in chronological order, beginning with Lou Gehrig's number 4. This was retired soon after Gehrig left baseball on July 4, 1939, the same day he gave his famous farewell speech. His was the first number retired in Major League Baseball history. Beneath the numbers are plaques with the names of the players and a descriptive paragraph.

The number 42 was retired throughout Major League Baseball in honor of Jackie Robinson on April 15, 1997, the 50th anniversary of his breaking the color barrier. The day was declared Jackie Robinson Day, and was later observed by all of baseball, with select players from every team wearing the number 42. Players who wore No. 42 at the time were allowed to continue to wear it until they left the team with which they played on April 15, 1997; Mariano Rivera was the last active player covered under that grandfather clause, wearing the number until his retirement after the 2013 season.

In 1972, the number 8 was retired for two players on the same day, in honor of catcher Bill Dickey and his protege, catcher Yogi Berra. Berra inherited Dickey's number in 1948 after Dickey ended his playing career and became a coach. The numbers 37 and 6, retired for Casey Stengel and Joe Torre respectively, are the only numbers retired by the Yankees for someone who served solely as manager of the team. Stengel managed the Yankees to ten pennants and seven world championships between 1949 and 1960, including a record five consecutive world championships from 1949 through 1953. Joe Torre managed the Yankees from 1996 to 2007, winning six pennants and four World Series championships. On May 14, 2017, the Yankees retired number 2 in honor of Derek Jeter. This leaves 0 as the only single-digit number available for future Yankees.

=== Hall of Famers ===
New York Yankees Hall of Famers
Affiliation according to the National Baseball Hall of Fame and Museum
New York Highlanders

**Jack Chesbro** †

Clark Griffith
Willie Keeler †

Branch Rickey

New York Yankees

Frank "Home Run" Baker
**Ed Barrow** †
Carlos Beltrán
**Yogi Berra** †
Wade Boggs
Frank Chance
**Earle Combs** †
Stan Coveleski
Bobby Cox
**Bill Dickey** †
**Joe DiMaggio** †

Leo Durocher
**Whitey Ford** †
**Lou Gehrig** †
**Lefty Gomez** †
**Joe Gordon** †
**Goose Gossage** †
Burleigh Grimes
Bucky Harris
Rickey Henderson
**Waite Hoyt** †
**Miller Huggins** †
Catfish Hunter

**Reggie Jackson**
**Derek Jeter** †
Randy Johnson
Andruw Jones
Jim Kaat
**Tony Lazzeri** †
Bob Lemon
Larry MacPhail
Lee MacPhail
**Mickey Mantle** †
**Joe McCarthy** †

Johnny Mize
Mike Mussina
Phil Niekro
Herb Pennock †
Gaylord Perry
Tim Raines
**Mariano Rivera** †
**Phil Rizzuto** †
Iván Rodríguez
**Red Ruffing** †
Jacob Ruppert †
**Babe Ruth** †

**CC Sabathia** †
Enos Slaughter
Joe Sewell
Lee Smith
**Casey Stengel** †
Ichiro Suzuki
**Joe Torre** †
Dazzy Vance
Paul Waner
George Weiss †
Dave Winfield †

- Players and managers listed in **bold** are depicted on their Hall of Fame plaques wearing a Yankees or Highlanders cap insignia.
- † denotes New York Yankees listed as primary team according to the Hall of Fame
New York Yankees Ford C. Frick Award recipients
Affiliation according to the National Baseball Hall of Fame and Museum

**Mel Allen**
**Red Barber**

**Buck Canel**
Jerry Coleman **

Joe Garagiola
Curt Gowdy

Al Helfer
Russ Hodges

Tony Kubek **

- **Names in bold** received the award based primarily on their work as broadcasters for the Yankees.
- ** Played as a Yankee

== Rivalries ==
The Yankees have multiple rivalries, most notably with the Boston Red Sox. The Yankees have rivalries with former crosstown National League teams the Los Angeles Dodgers and San Francisco Giants, and current crosstown rivals the New York Mets. The storied Dodgers–Yankees rivalry dates to the Dodgers' tenure in Brooklyn. The two teams have met in the World Series 12 times, including five since the Dodgers moved to Los Angeles in 1958. More recently, the Yankees have formed a rivalry with the Houston Astros after multiple postseason meetings and the revelations of the Astros' sign-stealing scandal.

=== American League ===
==== Boston Red Sox ====
The Red Sox–Yankees rivalry is one of the oldest, most famous, and fiercest rivalries in professional sports. The inaugural game between the two teams occurred in 1903, when the Yankees (then known as the Highlanders) hosted the Red Sox (then named the Americans) at Hilltop Park. The rivalry gave rise to the Curse of the Bambino: after Babe Ruth was traded to the Yankees in 1920, the Red Sox did not win a World Series until 2004, 86 years later.

The rivalry can be a heated subject, especially in the Northeastern United States. Since the inception of the wild card team and an added Division Series, the rivals have met in the playoffs five times (the Yankees won the 1999 and 2003 American League Championship Series; the Red Sox won in the 2004 American League Championship Series, 2018 American League Division Series, and the 2021 American League Wild Card Game). The teams have twice met in the last regular-season series of a season to decide the AL pennant: in 1904 (when the Red Sox won) and in 1949 (when the Yankees won). Games between the two teams are often broadcast on national television and often yield high television ratings.

The teams finished tied for first in 1978, when the Yankees, down 14 games to the Sox midway through the season, won a high-profile tie-breaker playoff for the AL East division title. Similarly, the 2004 ALCS saw the Yankees, who led the series 3 games to 0, lost the next four games and the series—the only time in MLB history that a team has come back from a 0–3 deficit to win a postseason series.

==== Cleveland Guardians ====
A long-standing rivalry between the Yankees and the Cleveland Guardians (formerly known as the Cleveland Indians) developed in the 1920s, when Cleveland shortstop Ray Chapman died on the field after Yankees pitcher Carl Mays hit Chapman in the head with a fastball. Cleveland would rally following the incident, winning their first World Series title in 1920, but the Yankees' subsequent dynastic run between 1921 and 1964 prevented Cleveland from attaining further success, other than another World Series title in 1948 and several winning seasons that followed. As a result, animosity ensued between the two franchises, pitting the perennially free-spending and dominant Yankees against the more conservative and underdog Indians.

George Steinbrenner would also be involved in the rivalry, in which he nearly purchased the Indians in the early 1970s; instead, he acquired majority ownership of the Yankees and led the team to seven World Series titles under his ownership. Since the advent of divisional playoffs in 1995, both teams faced off in seven postseason series, most recently in the 2024 American League Championship Series, with the Yankees winning five of the seven meetings.

==== Houston Astros ====
The Yankees' rivalry with the Astros emerged after the latter team moved to the American League in 2013 and eventually ascended to title contenders. The two teams have met in four postseason rounds, all of which were won by Houston. However, like the Astros' rivalry with the Dodgers, animosity grew immediately after the Astros were revealed to have stolen signs during their 2017 championship season, as well as the Yankees' inability to overcome Houston in the playoffs despite fielding equally strong rosters. Both teams are tied all-time with 43 wins apiece, but the Astros own a 13–5 postseason record.

=== Interleague ===
==== Los Angeles Dodgers ====
The Dodgers and the Yankees have met 12 times in the World Series, more than any other two teams from the American and National Leagues. The rivalry began when the Dodgers played in Brooklyn, and the two teams faced each other in seven Subway Series in the 1940s and 1950s.

After the Dodgers moved to Los Angeles in 1958, the rivalry continued as the teams represented two of the largest cities on each coast of the United States. Fan support has added to the notoriety of the series as both teams are supported by two of the largest fanbases in North America.

Although the rivalry's significance arose from the two teams' numerous World Series meetings, the Yankees and Dodgers did not meet in the World Series between 1981 and 2024. They did not play each other again in a non-exhibition game until 2004, when they played a three-game interleague series. Nevertheless, games between the two teams have drawn sellout crowds.

==== New York Mets: Subway Series ====
The Subway Series is a series of games played between teams based in New York City. The name originates from the New York City Subway and the accessibility of the each team's stadium within the subway system. Historically, the term "Subway Series" referred to games played between the Yankees and either the New York Giants or the Brooklyn Dodgers. Since the Dodgers and Giants have moved to Los Angeles and San Francisco, respectively, the New York Mets were established as an expansion team in 1962. The term's historic usage has been in reference to World Series games played between New York teams. The Yankees have appeared in all Subway Series games as they have been the only American League team in the city, and have compiled an 11–3 record in the 14 championship Subway Series. The most recent World Series between the two New York teams was in 2000, when the Yankees defeated the Mets in five games. Since 1997, the term "Subway Series" has also been applied to interleague play during the regular season between the Yankees and National League New York Mets.

==== San Francisco Giants ====
Though in different leagues, the Yankees have also been historical rivals of the New York Giants, who have since moved to San Francisco for the 1958 season. Before the institution of interleague play in 1997, the two teams had little opportunity to play each other except in seven World Series: 1921, 1922, 1923, 1936, 1937, 1951 and 1962, the Yankees winning last five of the seven Series. The teams have met five times in regular season interleague play: In 2002 at the old Yankee Stadium, in 2007 at Oracle Park (then known as AT&T Park), in 2013, 2016, and 2023 at the current Yankee Stadium, and in 2019 at Oracle Park. The teams' next regular season meetings will occur yearly, with the advent of the balanced schedule format introduced in 2023.

In his July 4, 1939, farewell speech ending with the renowned "Today, I consider myself the luckiest man on the face of the earth", Yankee slugger Lou Gehrig, who played in 2,130 consecutive games, declared that the Giants were a team he "would give his right arm to beat, and vice versa".

== Minor league affiliations ==
The New York Yankees farm system consists of six minor league affiliates.

Class	Team	League	Location	Ballpark	Affiliated
Triple-A	Scranton/Wilkes-Barre Highlanders	International League	Moosic, Pennsylvania	PNC Field	2007
Double-A	Somerset Patriots	Eastern League	Bridgewater Township, New Jersey	TD Bank Ballpark	2021
High-A	Hudson Valley Renegades	South Atlantic League	Wappingers Falls, New York	Heritage Financial Park	2021
Single-A	Tampa Tarpons	Florida State League	Tampa, Florida	George M. Steinbrenner Field	1994
Rookie	FCL Yankees	Florida Complex League	Tampa, Florida	George M. Steinbrenner Field	1980
Rookie	DSL Yankees	Dominican Summer League	Boca Chica, Santo Domingo	New York Yankees Complex	1994

== See also ==
- List of World Series champions
- List of New York Yankees managers

== Notes ==
Awards and achievements
Preceded by New York Giants; 1922	World Series champions 1923	Succeeded by Washington Senators; 1924
Preceded by St. Louis Cardinals; 1926	World Series champions 1927–1928	Succeeded by Philadelphia Athletics; 1929
Preceded by St. Louis Cardinals; 1931	World Series champions 1932	Succeeded by New York Giants; 1933
Preceded by Detroit Tigers; 1935	World Series champions 1936–1939	Succeeded by Cincinnati Reds; 1940
Preceded by Cincinnati Reds; 1940	World Series champions 1941	Succeeded by St. Louis Cardinals; 1942
Preceded by St. Louis Cardinals; 1942	World Series champions 1943	Succeeded by St. Louis Cardinals; 1944
Preceded by St. Louis Cardinals; 1946	World Series champions 1947	Succeeded by Cleveland Indians; 1948
Preceded by Cleveland Indians; 1948	World Series champions 1949–1953	Succeeded by New York Giants; 1954
Preceded by Brooklyn Dodgers; 1955	World Series champions 1956	Succeeded by Milwaukee Braves; 1957
Preceded by Milwaukee Braves; 1957	World Series champions 1958	Succeeded by Los Angeles Dodgers; 1959
Preceded by Pittsburgh Pirates; 1960	World Series champions 1961–1962	Succeeded by Los Angeles Dodgers; 1963
Preceded by Cincinnati Reds; 1976	World Series champions 1977–1978	Succeeded by Pittsburgh Pirates; 1979
Preceded by Atlanta Braves; 1995	World Series champions 1996	Succeeded by Florida Marlins; 1997
Preceded by Florida Marlins; 1997	World Series champions 1998–2000	Succeeded by Arizona Diamondbacks; 2001
Preceded by Philadelphia Phillies; 2008	World Series champions 2009	Succeeded by San Francisco Giants; 2010
Preceded by Cleveland Indians; 1920	American League champions 1921–1923	Succeeded by Washington Senators; 1924–1925
Preceded by Washington Senators; 1924–1925	American League champions 1926–1928	Succeeded by Philadelphia Athletics; 1929–1931
Preceded by Philadelphia Athletics; 1929–1931	American League champions 1932	Succeeded by Washington Senators; 1933
Preceded by Detroit Tigers; 1934–1935	American League champions 1936–1939	Succeeded by Detroit Tigers; 1940
Preceded by Detroit Tigers; 1940	American League champions 1941–1943	Succeeded by St. Louis Browns; 1944
Preceded by Boston Red Sox; 1946	American League champions 1947	Succeeded by Cleveland Indians; 1948
Preceded by Cleveland Indians; 1948	American League champions 1949–1953	Succeeded by Cleveland Indians; 1954
Preceded by Cleveland Indians; 1954	American League champions 1955–1958	Succeeded by Chicago White Sox; 1959
Preceded by Chicago White Sox; 1959	American League champions 1960–1964	Succeeded by Minnesota Twins; 1965
Preceded by Boston Red Sox; 1975	American League champions 1976–1978	Succeeded by Baltimore Orioles; 1979
Preceded by Kansas City Royals; 1980	American League champions 1981	Succeeded by Milwaukee Brewers; 1982
Preceded by Cleveland Indians; 1995	American League champions 1996	Succeeded by Cleveland Indians; 1997
Preceded by Cleveland Indians; 1997	American League champions 1998–2001	Succeeded by Anaheim Angels; 2002
Preceded by Anaheim Angels; 2002	American League champions 2003	Succeeded by Boston Red Sox; 2004
Preceded by Tampa Bay Rays; 2008	American League champions 2009	Succeeded by Texas Rangers; 2010–2011
Preceded by Texas Rangers; 2023	American League champions 2024	Succeeded by Toronto Blue Jays; 2025
