= 2025 New York Yankees season =

2025 New York Yankees
- American League Wild Card winners
- League: American League
- Division: East
- Ballpark: Yankee Stadium
- City: New York
- Record: 94–68 (.580)
- Divisional place: 2nd
- Owners: Yankee Global Enterprises
- President: Randy Levine
- General managers: Brian Cashman
- Managers: Aaron Boone
- Television: YES Network; Amazon Prime Video (Michael Kay, Ryan Ruocco, John Flaherty, Paul O'Neill, Joe Girardi, David Cone, Jeff Nelson, Meredith Marakovits, Jack Curry, Justin Shackil, Bob Lorenz, Nancy Newman, Todd Frazier, Nick Swisher)
- Radio: WFAN SportsRadio 66 AM / 101.9 FM; New York Yankees Radio Network (Dave Sims, Emmanuel Berbari, Suzyn Waldman); WADO 1280 AM TUDN Radio; Cadena Radio Yankees (Francisco Rivera, Rickie Ricardo)

The 2025 New York Yankees season was the 123rd season for the New York Yankees of Major League Baseball. They entered the season as the defending champions of the American League East and the American League, and runner-up of the 2024 World Series.

The Yankees had a 7-game lead atop the AL East on May 28, but stumbled in June and July, allowing the Blue Jays to win the division via head-to-head tiebreaker. They secured a wild card berth to make the postseason for the second consecutive year and 8th time in the past 9 seasons (2017–2022, 2024–2025) on September 23 with a win over the Chicago White Sox. They finished with a 94–68 record, the same record as in the 2024 season.

With the best record among the American League Wild Card teams, they clinched the fourth seed in the playoffs and faced the Boston Red Sox in the Wild Card Series, their sixth postseason meeting in the history of the Red Sox–Yankees rivalry. The Yankees defeated the Red Sox in three games to advance to the Division Series for the second consecutive year, where they were defeated in four games to the top-seeded division rival Toronto Blue Jays.

This was the first full season for Dave Sims on the Yankees' radio station WFAN and on the Yankees Radio Network. Sims replaced John Sterling, who had retired after the 2024 season, having called Yankees games since 1989.

On February 21, 2025, managing general partner Hal Steinbrenner announced that the organization had amended its long-standing facial grooming policy, established by his late father George shortly after his purchase of the team in 1973 after observing players with shaggy hair, mutton chops and unkempt mustaches. The new policy states that Yankees players, coaches, and other uniformed personnel are now permitted to have "well-groomed beards," but within "parameters" to maintain a look that is "clean and disciplined." Steinbrenner and General Manager Brian Cashman indicated that this significant change was made to ensure that an outdated policy would not cause the franchise to miss out on potential future free agents.

On March 29, the Yankees set a franchise record for most home runs in a game, with nine. They later tied the record on August 19, and the following day tied the major league record for most homers in a two-game series with 14.

The Yankees drew an average home attendance of 42,408, the 3rd-highest of all baseball teams in the world.

== Offseason ==
=== Transactions ===
==== 2024 ====
- November 4 – traded outfielder Taylor Trammell to the Houston Astros in exchange for cash considerations.
- November 22 – re-signed outfielder Trent Grisham to a one-year, $5 million contract to avoid arbitration. The Yankees also re-signed right-handed starting pitcher JT Brubaker to a one-year contract avoiding arbitration.
- December 10 – signed left-handed starting pitcher Max Fried to an eight-year, $218 million deal.
- December 11 – re-signed right-handed relief pitcher Jonathan Loáisiga to a one-year deal with a team option for 2026. The Yankees also acquired right-handed pitching prospect Elmer Rodriguez-Cruz and international signing bonus pool money from the Boston Red Sox in exchange for catcher Carlos Narváez.
- December 13 – acquired right-handed relief pitcher Devin Williams from the Milwaukee Brewers in exchange for left-handed starting pitcher Nestor Cortés Jr., infielder Caleb Durbin, and cash considerations. The following month, he agreed to a one-year, $8.6 million deal avoiding arbitration.
- December 17 – acquired outfielder/first baseman Cody Bellinger and cash considerations from the Chicago Cubs in exchange for right-handed starting pitcher Cody Poteet.
- December 20 – acquired right-handed relief pitcher Fernando Cruz and catcher Alex Jackson from the Cincinnati Reds in exchange for catcher Jose Trevino.
- December 30 – signed first baseman Paul Goldschmidt to a one-year, $12.5 million deal.

==== 2025 ====
- January 9 – re-signed infielder Jazz Chisholm Jr. to a one-year, $5.85 million contract avoiding arbitration. The Yankees also re-signed right-handed starting pitcher Clarke Schmidt to a one-year, $3.6 million contract in his second year of arbitration eligibility. They also re-signed right-handed relief pitcher Scott Effross to a one-year, $800,000 contract avoiding arbitration.
- January 15 – acquired right-handed relief pitcher Michael Arias from the Chicago Cubs in exchange for cash considerations.
- January 23 – claimed right-handed starting pitcher Allan Winans off waivers from the Atlanta Braves. The Yankees also claimed right-handed relief pitcher Roansy Contreras off waivers from the Baltimore Orioles.
- February 4 – re-signed relief pitcher Tim Hill to a one-year, $2.85 million contract with a club option for 2026 for $3 million which includes a $350,000 buyout.
- February 5 – claimed shortstop Braden Shewmake off waivers from the Kansas City Royals. The Yankees also claimed right-handed relief pitcher Owen White off waivers from the Cincinnati Reds.
- February 11 – claimed left-handed relief pitcher Brent Headrick off waivers from the Minnesota Twins.
- March 24 – signed left-handed relief pitcher Ryan Yarbrough to a one-year, $2 million deal.

== Regular season ==
=== Transactions ===
==== 2025 ====
- April 1 – signed right-handed relief pitcher Adam Ottavino to a one-year deal.
- April 7 – signed right-handed relief pitcher Adam Ottavino to a one-year deal.
- May 1 – claimed outfielder Bryan De La Cruz off waivers from the Atlanta Braves.
- May 16 – traded left-handed relief pitcher Rob Zastryzny to the Milwaukee Brewers in exchange for cash considerations.
- June 8 – claimed third baseman CJ Alexander off waivers from the Athletics.
- July 6 – traded catcher Alex Jackson to the Baltimore Orioles in exchange for international signing bonus pool money and a player to be named later or cash considerations.
- July 8 – claimed right-handed relief pitcher Rico Garcia off waivers from the New York Mets.
- July 25 – acquired third baseman Ryan McMahon from the Colorado Rockies in exchange for left-handed pitching prospect Griffin Herring and right-hander Josh Grosz.
- July 26 – acquired infielder Amed Rosario from the Washington Nationals in exchange for right-handed reliever Clayton Beeter and outfield prospect Browm Martinez.
- July 28 – traded right-handed starting pitcher Carlos Carrasco to the Atlanta Braves in exchange for a player to be named later or cash considerations.
- July 28 – acquired outfielder Austin Slater from the Chicago White Sox in exchange for right-handed pitching prospect Gage Ziehl.
- July 30 – acquired right-handed relief pitcher David Bednar from the Pittsburgh Pirates in exchange for catching prospects Rafael Flores and Edgleen Perez and outfield prospect Brian Sanchez. They also acquired right-handed relief pitcher Jake Bird from the Colorado Rockies in exchange for infield prospect Roc Riggio and pitching prospect Ben Shields. They also traded infielder Oswald Peraza to the Los Angeles Angels in exchange for outfield prospect Wilberson De Pena and international pool money. They also acquired utility player José Caballero from the Tampa Bay Rays in exchange for outfielder Everson Pereira and a player to be named later or cash considerations. They also acquired right-handed relief pitcher Camilo Doval from the San Francisco Giants in exchange for catching prospect Jesús Rodríguez, infield prospect Parks Harber, and pitching prospects Trystan Vrieling and Carlos De La Rosa.
- August 21 – signed right-handed relief pitcher Paul Blackburn to a one-year deal.

=== Season standings ===
==== American League East ====
AL East
Team	W	L	Pct.	GB	Home	Road
Toronto Blue Jays	94	68	.580	—	54‍–‍27	40‍–‍41
New York Yankees	94	68	.580	—	50‍–‍31	44‍–‍37
Boston Red Sox	89	73	.549	5	48‍–‍33	41‍–‍40
Tampa Bay Rays	77	85	.475	17	41‍–‍40	36‍–‍45
Baltimore Orioles	75	87	.463	19	39‍–‍42	36‍–‍45

==== American League Wild Card ====
Division leaders
Team	W	L	Pct.
Toronto Blue Jays	94	68	.580
Seattle Mariners	90	72	.556
Cleveland Guardians	88	74	.543

Wild Card teams (Top 3 teams qualify for postseason)
Team	W	L	Pct.	GB
New York Yankees	94	68	.580	+7
Boston Red Sox	89	73	.549	+2
Detroit Tigers	87	75	.537	—
Houston Astros	87	75	.537	—
Kansas City Royals	82	80	.506	5
Texas Rangers	81	81	.500	6
Tampa Bay Rays	77	85	.475	10
Athletics	76	86	.469	11
Baltimore Orioles	75	87	.463	12
Los Angeles Angels	72	90	.444	15
Minnesota Twins	70	92	.432	17
Chicago White Sox	60	102	.370	27

==== Record vs. opponents ====
===== Record vs. American League =====
2025 American League record Source: MLB Standings Grid – 2025
Team	ATH	BAL	BOS	CWS	CLE	DET	HOU	KC	LAA	MIN	NYY	SEA	TB	TEX	TOR	NL
Athletics	—	4–2	3–3	5–1	2–4	4–2	8–5	4–2	4–9	4–3	2–4	6–7	3–3	5–8	2–5	20–28
Baltimore	2–4	—	5–8	6–0	3–4	1–5	3–4	2–4	5–1	0–6	4–9	5–1	7–6	2–4	6–7	24–24
Boston	3–3	8–5	—	4–3	4–2	2–4	4–2	4–2	1–5	3–3	9–4	3–3	10–3	3–4	5–8	26–22
Chicago	1–5	0–6	3–4	—	2–11	5–8	3–3	3–10	3–3	8–5	1–6	1–5	4–2	2–4	3–3	21–27
Cleveland	4–2	4–3	2–4	11–2	—	8–5	4–2	8–5	3–3	9–4	3–3	2–4	5–2	2–4	3–3	20–28
Detroit	2–4	5–1	4–2	8–5	5–8	—	4–2	9–4	5–2	8–5	4–2	2–4	3–3	2–4	3–4	23–25
Houston	5–8	4–3	2–4	3–3	2–4	2–4	—	3–3	8–5	5–1	3-3	5–8	3–4	7–6	4–2	31–17
Kansas City	2–4	4–2	2–4	10–3	5–8	4–9	3–3	—	3–3	7–6	0–6	3–4	3–3	6-1	4–2	26–22
Los Angeles	9–4	1–5	5–1	3–3	3–3	2–5	5–8	3–3	—	2–4	3–4	4–9	3–3	5–8	2–4	22–26
Minnesota	3–4	6–0	3–3	5–8	4–9	5–8	1–5	6–7	4–2	—	2–4	3–4	3–3	3–3	2–4	20–28
New York	4–2	9–4	4–9	6–1	3–3	2–4	3–3	6–0	4–3	4–2	—	5–1	9–4	4–2	5–8	26–22
Seattle	7–6	1–5	3–3	5–1	4–2	4–2	8–5	4–3	9–4	4–3	1–5	—	3–3	10–3	2–4	25–23
Tampa Bay	3–3	6–7	3–10	2–4	2–5	3–3	4–3	3–3	3–3	3–3	4–9	3–3	—	3–3	7–6	28–20
Texas	8–5	4–2	4–3	4–2	4–2	4–2	6–7	1-6	8–5	3–3	2–4	3–10	3–3	—	2–4	25–23
Toronto	5–2	7–6	8–5	3–3	3–3	4–3	2–4	2–4	4–2	4–2	8–5	4–2	6–7	4–2	—	30–18

Updated with the results of all games through September 28, 2025.

===== Record vs. National League =====
2025 American League record vs. National League Source: MLB Standings
Team	AZ	ATL	CHC	CIN	COL	LAD	MIA	MIL	NYM	PHI	PIT	SD	SF	STL	WSH
Athletics	1–2	2–1	0–3	3–0	2–1	1–2	2–1	1–2	1–2	1–2	1–2	1–2	1–5	1–2	2–1
Baltimore	1–2	3–0	1–2	1–2	2–1	2–1	1–2	1–2	2–1	1–2	3–0	3–0	1–2	1–2	1–5
Boston	1–2	3–3	1–2	2–1	3–0	2–1	2–1	0–3	2–1	1–2	1–2	1–2	1–2	3–0	3–0
Chicago	1–2	1–2	1–5	2–1	2–1	0–3	2–1	1–2	1–2	2–1	3–0	1–2	2–1	0–3	2–1
Cleveland	1–2	0–3	0–3	1–5	2–1	1–2	2–1	2–1	3–0	1–2	3–0	0–3	2–1	0–3	2–1
Detroit	3–0	0–3	2–1	1–2	3–0	0–3	1–2	1–2	1–2	1–2	2–4	2–1	3–0	2–1	1–2
Houston	3–0	2–1	2–1	2–1	4–2	3–0	2–1	1–2	2–1	3–0	2–1	2–1	0–3	1–2	2–1
Kansas City	2–1	2–1	2–1	1–2	3–0	1–2	1–2	1–2	1–2	1–2	3–0	1–2	2–1	3–3	2–1
Los Angeles	2–1	2–1	0–3	1–2	1–2	6–0	1–2	0–3	0–3	2–1	1–2	1–2	2–1	2–1	1–2
Minnesota	1–2	0–3	2–1	1–2	1–2	1–2	1–2	2–4	2–1	1–2	2–1	2–1	3–0	0–3	1–2
New York	1–2	2–1	1–2	1–2	2–1	1–2	0–3	3–0	3–3	1–2	2–1	2–1	1–2	3–0	3–0
Seattle	0–3	2–1	2–1	2–1	3–0	0–3	2–1	1–2	1–2	0–3	3–0	5–1	0–3	3–0	1–2
Tampa Bay	2–1	2–1	1–2	0–3	2–1	1–2	3–3	2–1	3–0	0–3	2–1	3–0	2–1	2–1	3–0
Texas	2–4	3–0	1–2	2–1	3–0	1–2	0–3	3–0	2–1	0–3	2–1	1–2	1–2	2–1	2–1
Toronto	2–1	2–1	2–1	2–1	3–0	1–2	2–1	1–2	0–3	2–4	1–2	3–0	3–0	3–0	3–0

Updated with the results of all games through September 28, 2025.

=== Game log ===
Legend
	Yankees win
	Yankees loss
	Postponement
	Clinched playoff spot
**Bold**	Yankees team member

2025 Game Log: 94–68 (Home: 50–31; Away: 44–37)
March/April: 18–13 (Home: 10–5; Away: 8–8)

#	Date	Opponent	Score	Win	Loss	Save	Stadium	Attendance	Record
1	March 27	Brewers	4–2	**Rodón** (1–0)	Peralta (0–1)	**Williams** (1)	**Yankee Stadium**	46,208	1–0
2	March 29	Brewers	20–9	**Gómez** (1–0)	Cortés Jr. (0–1)	—	**Yankee Stadium**	46,683	2–0
3	March 30	Brewers	12–3	**Hill** (1–0)	Civale (0–1)	—	**Yankee Stadium**	41,803	3–0
4	April 1	Diamondbacks	5–7	Miller (1–0)	**Leiter Jr.** (0–1)	Puk (1)	**Yankee Stadium**	37,482	3–1
5	April 2	Diamondbacks	3–4	Gallen (1–1)	**Rodón** (1–1)	Puk (2)	**Yankee Stadium**	40,558	3–2
6	April 3	Diamondbacks	9–7	**Carrasco** (1–0)	Kelly (1–1)	**Weaver** (1)	**Yankee Stadium**	43,382	4–2
7	April 4	@ Pirates	9–4	**Fried** (1–0)	Keller (1–1)	—	PNC Park	36,893	5–2
8	April 5	@ Pirates	10–4	**Leiter Jr.** (1–1)	**Falter** (0–1)	—	PNC Park	30,570	6–2
9	April 6	@ Pirates	4–5 (11)	Wentz (1–1)	**Williams** (0–1)	—	PNC Park	22,898	6–3
10	April 7	@ Tigers	2–6	Mize (2–0)	**Rodón** (1–2)	—	Comerica Park	14,132	6–4
11	April 8	@ Tigers	0–5	Skubal (1–2)	**Carrasco** (1–1)	Hurter (2)	Comerica Park	14,156	6–5
12	April 9	@ Tigers	4–3	**Fried** (2–0)	Holton (1–1)	**Leiter Jr.** (1)	Comerica Park	14,616	7–5
13	April 11	Giants	1–9 (6)	Ray (3–0)	**Stroman** (0–1)	—	**Yankee Stadium**	35,286	7–6
14	April 12	Giants	8–4	**Warren** (1–0)	Hicks (1–1)	—	**Yankee Stadium**	35,455	8–6
15	April 13	Giants	4–5	Webb (2–0)	**Rodón** (1–3)	Walker (4)	**Yankee Stadium**	36,449	8–7
16	April 14	Royals	4–1	**Carrasco** (2–1)	Lugo (1–2)	**Williams** (2)	**Yankee Stadium**	42,648	9–7
17	April 15	Royals	4–2	**Fried** (3–0)	Wacha (0–3)	**Williams** (3)	**Yankee Stadium**	43,601	10–7
18	April 16	Royals	4–3	**Leiter Jr.** (2–1)	Schreiber (1–1)	**Cruz** (1)	**Yankee Stadium**	43,720	11–7
19	April 17	@ Rays	6–3	**Hill** (2–0)	Bradley (2–1)	**Williams** (4)	George M. Steinbrenner Field	10,046	12–7
20	April 18	@ Rays	1–0	**Rodón** (2–3)	Rasmussen (1–1)	**Weaver** (2)	George M. Steinbrenner Field	10,046	13–7
21	April 19	@ Rays	8–10 (10)	Uceta (1–1)	**Gómez** (1–1)	—	George M. Steinbrenner Field	10,046	13–8
22	April 20	@ Rays	4–0	**Fried** (4–0)	Pepiot (1–3)	**Cruz** (2)	George M. Steinbrenner Field	10,046	14–8
23	April 21	@ Guardians	4–6	Williams (2–1)	**Schmidt** (0–1)	Smith (1)	Progressive Field	20,896	14–9
24	April 22	@ Guardians	2–3	Bibee (2–1)	**Leiter Jr.** (2–2)	Smith (2)	Progressive Field	21,549	14–10
25	April 23	@ Guardians	5–1	**Rodón** (3–3)	Ortiz (2–3)	—	Progressive Field	23,981	15–10
26	April 25	Blue Jays	2–4	Fluharty (1–0)	**Williams** (0–2)	Hoffman (6)	**Yankee Stadium**	46,081	15–11
―	April 26	Blue Jays	Postponed due to rain. Makeup date April 27.						
27	April 27 (1)	Blue Jays	11–2	**Fried** (5–0)	Gausman (2–3)	—	**Yankee Stadium**	see 2nd game	16–11
28	April 27 (2)	Blue Jays	5–1	**Hill** (3–0)	Bassitt (2–2)	—	**Yankee Stadium**	43,824	17–11
29	April 28	@ Orioles	3–4	Sugano (3–1)	**Warren** (1–1)	Bautista (4)	Camden Yards	22,775	17–12
30	April 29	@ Orioles	15–3	**Rodón** (4–3)	Gibson (0–1)	—	Camden Yards	22,164	18–12
31	April 30	@ Orioles	4–5	Baker (2–0)	**Carrasco** (2–2)	Bautista (5)	Camden Yards	22,381	18–13

May: 17–9 (Home: 8–4; Road: 9–5)

#	Date	Opponent	Score	Win	Loss	Save	Stadium	Attendance	Record
32	May 2	Rays	3–0	**Fried** (6–0)	Pepiot (2–4)	**Weaver** (3)	**Yankee Stadium**	45,189	19–13
33	May 3	Rays	2–3	Littell (2–5)	**Leiter Jr.** (2–3)	Fairbanks (7)	**Yankee Stadium**	44,051	19–14
34	May 4	Rays	5–7	Bradley (3–2)	**Warren** (1–2)	Fairbanks (8)	**Yankee Stadium**	43,349	19–15
35	May 5	Padres	3–4	Bergert (1–0)	**Weaver** (0–1)	Suárez (14)	**Yankee Stadium**	38,128	19–16
36	May 6	Padres	12–3	**Cruz** (1–0)	Morejón (1–1)	—	**Yankee Stadium**	38,090	20–16
37	May 7	Padres	4–3 (10)	**Williams** (1–2)	Estrada (1–2)	—	**Yankee Stadium**	42,302	21–16
38	May 9	@ Athletics	10–2	**Warren** (2–2)	Bido (2–3)	—	Sutter Health Park	12,049	22–16
39	May 10	@ Athletics	7–11	Holman (4–0)	**Cruz** (1–1)	Miller (11)	Sutter Health Park	12,113	22–17
40	May 11	@ Athletics	12–2	**Yarbrough** (1–0)	Severino (1–4)	—	Sutter Health Park	12,224	23–17
41	May 12	@ Mariners	11–5	**Schmidt** (1–1)	Hancock (1–2)	—	T-Mobile Park	27,895	24–17
42	May 13	@ Mariners	1–2 (11)	Legumina (3–1)	**Hill** (3–1)	—	T-Mobile Park	38,840	24–18
43	May 14	@ Mariners	3–2	**Hamilton** (1–0)	Vargas (1–3)	**Weaver** (4)	T-Mobile Park	30,520	25–18
44	May 16	Mets	6–2	**Rodón** (5–3)	Megill (3–4)	**Weaver** (5)	**Yankee Stadium**	47,700	26–18
45	May 17	Mets	2–3	Garrett (1–1)	**Cruz** (1–2)	Díaz (10)	**Yankee Stadium**	47,510	26–19
46	May 18	Mets	8–2	**Williams** (2–2)	Stanek (1–4)	—	**Yankee Stadium**	48,028	27–19
47	May 20	Rangers	5–2	**Warren** (3–2)	Corbin (3–3)	**Weaver** (6)	**Yankee Stadium**	40,343	28–19
48	May 21	Rangers	4–3	**Weaver** (1–1)	Jackson (0–4)	—	**Yankee Stadium**	40,359	29–19
49	May 22	Rangers	1–0	**Rodón** (6–3)	Eovaldi (4–3)	**Weaver** (7)	**Yankee Stadium**	43,450	30–19
50	May 23	@ Rockies	2–3	Gordon (1–1)	**Schmidt** (1–2)	Agnos (3)	Coors Field	47,211	30–20
51	May 24	@ Rockies	13–1	**Fried** (7–0)	Freeland (0–7)	—	Coors Field	43,186	31–20
52	May 25	@ Rockies	5–4	**Leiter Jr.** (3–3)	Senzatela (1–9)	**Weaver** (8)	Coors Field	38,379	32–20
53	May 26	@ Angels	5–1	**Yarbrough** (2–0)	Kochanowicz (3–6)	—	Angel Stadium	43,626	33–20
54	May 27	@ Angels	3–2	**Rodón** (7–3)	Anderson (2–2)	**Williams** (5)	Angel Stadium	34,491	34–20
55	May 28	@ Angels	1–0	**Schmidt** (2–2)	Kikuchi (1–5)	**Leiter Jr.** (2)	Angel Stadium	36,808	35–20
56	May 30	@ Dodgers	5–8	Gonsolin (3–1)	**Fried** (7–1)	Vesia (2)	Dodger Stadium	53,276	35–21
57	May 31	@ Dodgers	2–18	Knack (3–2)	**Warren** (3–3)	—	Dodger Stadium	51,746	35–22

June: 13–14 (Home: 8–8; Road: 5–6)

#	Date	Opponent	Score	Win	Loss	Save	Stadium	Attendance	Record
58	June 1	@ Dodgers	7–3	**Yarbrough** (3–0)	Yamamoto (6–4)	—	Dodger Stadium	54,031	36–22
59	June 3	Guardians	3–2	**Rodón** (8–3)	Bibee (4–6)	**Williams** (6)	**Yankee Stadium**	40,683	37–22
60	June 4	Guardians	0–4	Ortiz (3–6)	**Schmidt** (2–3)	—	**Yankee Stadium**	36,759	37–23
61	June 5	Guardians	4–0	**Fried** (8–1)	Cecconi (1–2)	—	**Yankee Stadium**	41,665	38–23
62	June 6	Red Sox	9–6	**Warren** (4–3)	Buehler (4–4)	**Williams** (7)	**Yankee Stadium**	46,783	39–23
63	June 7	Red Sox	7–10	Crochet (6–4)	**Yarbrough** (3–1)	Chapman (10)	**Yankee Stadium**	47,020	39–24
64	June 8	Red Sox	7–11	Dobbins (3–1)	**Rodón** (8–4)	Chapman (11)	**Yankee Stadium**	45,140	39–25
65	June 10	@ Royals	10–2	**Fried** (9–1)	Cameron (2–2)	—	Kauffman Stadium	30,017	40–25
66	June 11	@ Royals	6–3	**Schmidt** (3–3)	Bubic (5–4)	**Williams** (8)	Kauffman Stadium	21,182	41–25
67	June 12	@ Royals	1–0	**Leiter Jr.** (4–3)	Erceg (1–2)	**Williams** (9)	Kauffman Stadium	23,412	42–25
68	June 13	@ Red Sox	1–2 (10)	Whitlock (5–0)	**Hill** (3–2)	—	Fenway Park	36,622	42–26
69	June 14	@ Red Sox	3–4	Dobbins (4–1)	**Rodón** (8–5)	Weissert (2)	Fenway Park	36,414	42–27
70	June 15	@ Red Sox	0–2	Bello (3–1)	**Fried** (9–2)	Whitlock (1)	Fenway Park	36,475	42–28
71	June 16	Angels	0–1 (11)	Zeferjahn (4–1)	**Loáisiga** (0–1)	Strickland (1)	**Yankee Stadium**	37,398	42–29
72	June 17	Angels	0–4	Hendricks (5–6)	**Warren** (4–4)	—	**Yankee Stadium**	35,278	42–30
73	June 18	Angels	2–3	Neris (3–1)	**Cruz** (1–3)	Jansen (15)	**Yankee Stadium**	43,255	42–31
74	June 19	Angels	7–3	**Rodón** (9–5)	Anderson (2–5)	—	**Yankee Stadium**	45,671	43–31
75	June 20	Orioles	3–5	Blewett (3–0)	**Weaver** (1–2)	Bautista (16)	**Yankee Stadium**	47,034	43–32
76	June 21	Orioles	9–0	**Schmidt** (4–3)	Eflin (6–4)	—	**Yankee Stadium**	46,142	44–32
77	June 22	Orioles	4–2	**Cruz** (2–3)	Baker (3–2)	**Williams** (10)	**Yankee Stadium**	45,571	45–32
78	June 23	@ Reds	1–6	Barlow (3–0)	**Winans** (0–1)	—	Great American Ball Park	31,418	45–33
79	June 24	@ Reds	4–5 (11)	Phillips (1–0)	**Leiter Jr.** (4–4)	—	Great American Ball Park	39,257	45–34
80	June 25	@ Reds	7–1	**Fried** (10–2)	Singer (7–6)	—	Great American Ball Park	27,620	46–34
81	June 27	Athletics	3–0	**Warren** (5–4)	Spence (2–3)	**Williams** (11)	**Yankee Stadium**	46,192	47–34
82	June 28	Athletics	0–7	Sears (6–7)	**Schmidt** (4–4)	Perkins (1)	**Yankee Stadium**	45,084	47–35
83	June 29	Athletics	12–5	**Stroman** (1–1)	Severino (2–9)	—	**Yankee Stadium**	42,166	48–35
84	June 30	@ Blue Jays	4–5	Little (4–1)	**Leiter Jr.** (4–5)	Hoffman (19)	Rogers Centre	40,619	48–36

July: 12–13 (Home: 8–5; Road: 4–8)

#	Date	Opponent	Score	Win	Loss	Save	Stadium	Attendance	Record
85	July 1	@ Blue Jays	5–12	Fisher (2–0)	**Leiter Jr.** (4–6)	—	Rogers Centre	41,129	48–37
86	July 2	@ Blue Jays	9–11	García (1–2)	**Williams** (2–3)	Hoffman (20)	Rogers Centre	30,985	48–38
87	July 3	@ Blue Jays	5–8	Bassitt (8–4)	**Beeter** (0–1)	Hoffman (21)	Rogers Centre	36,848	48–39
88	July 4	@ Mets	5–6	Brazobán (4–2)	**Weaver** (1–3)	Garrett (3)	Citi Field	41,216	48–40
89	July 5	@ Mets	6–12	Montas (1–1)	**Rodón** (9–6)	—	Citi Field	41,401	48–41
90	July 6	@ Mets	6–4	**Fried** (11–2)	Pop (0–1)	**Williams** (12)	Citi Field	41,117	49–41
91	July 8	Mariners	10–3	**Warren** (6–4)	Gilbert (2–3)	—	**Yankee Stadium**	38,641	50–41
92	July 9	Mariners	9–6	**Schlittler** (1–0)	Evans (3–3)	**Williams** (13)	**Yankee Stadium**	36,651	51–41
93	July 10	Mariners	6–5 (10)	**Williams** (3–3)	Speier (2–1)	—	**Yankee Stadium**	41,241	52–41
94	July 11	Cubs	11–0	**Rodón** (10–6)	Flexen (5–1)	—	**Yankee Stadium**	46,327	53–41
95	July 12	Cubs	2–5	Boyd (10–3)	**Fried** (11–3)	Palencia (11)	**Yankee Stadium**	46,839	53–42
96	July 13	Cubs	1–4	Imanaga (6–3)	**Warren** (6–5)	Palencia (12)	**Yankee Stadium**	45,435	53–43
**95th All-Star Game in Cumberland, Georgia**
97	July 18	@ Braves	3–7	Strider (4–7)	**Hamilton** (1–1)	—	Truist Park	41,844	53–44
98	July 19	@ Braves	12–9	**Weaver** (2–3)	Iglesias (4–6)	—	Truist Park	42,530	54–44
99	July 20	@ Braves	4–2	**Stroman** (2–1)	Holmes (4–9)	**Williams** (14)	Truist Park	40,125	55–44
100	July 21	@ Blue Jays	1–4	Gausman (7–7)	**Rodón** (10–7)	Hoffman (24)	Rogers Centre	41,788	55–45
101	July 22	@ Blue Jays	5–4	**Hamilton** (2–1)	Hoffman (6–3)	**Williams** (15)	Rogers Centre	42,326	56–45
102	July 23	@ Blue Jays	4–8	Bassitt (11–4)	**Fried** (11–4)	—	Rogers Centre	42,143	56–46
103	July 25	Phillies	5–12	Banks (3–2)	**Hill** (3–3)	—	**Yankee Stadium**	47,018	56–47
104	July 26	Phillies	4–9	Suárez (8–4)	**Stroman** (2–2)	—	**Yankee Stadium**	46,621	56–48
105	July 27	Phillies	4–3	**Rodón** (11–7)	Wheeler (9–4)	**Williams** (16)	**Yankee Stadium**	45,612	57–48
106	July 28	Rays	2–4	Rasmussen (8–5)	**Schlittler** (1–1)	Fairbanks (18)	**Yankee Stadium**	37,308	57–49
107	July 29	Rays	7–5	**Fried** (12–4)	Boyle (1–1)	**Williams** (17)	**Yankee Stadium**	35,660	58–49
108	July 30	Rays	5–4 (11)	**Hill** (4–3)	Kelly (0–3)	—	**Yankee Stadium**	45,355	59–49
109	July 31	Rays	7–4	**Stroman** (3–2)	Pepiot (6–9)	**Loáisiga** (1)	**Yankee Stadium**	44,292	60–49

August: 16–12 (Home: 7–6; Road: 9–6)

#	Date	Opponent	Score	Win	Loss	Save	Stadium	Attendance	Record
110	August 1	@ Marlins	12–13	Bender (3–5)	**Doval** (4–3)	—	LoanDepot Park	32,299	60–50
111	August 2	@ Marlins	0–2	Pérez (4–3)	**Schlittler** (1–2)	Faucher (11)	LoanDepot Park	34,645	60–51
112	August 3	@ Marlins	3–7	Cabrera (5–5)	**Gil** (0–1)	—	LoanDepot Park	34,601	60–52
113	August 4	@ Rangers	5–8 (10)	Coulombe (2–0)	**Bird** (4–2)	—	Globe Life Field	33,320	60–53
114	August 5	@ Rangers	0–2	Eovaldi (10–3)	**Williams** (3–4)	Maton (3)	Globe Life Field	35,399	60–54
115	August 6	@ Rangers	3–2	**Leiter Jr.** (5–6)	Garcia (1–7)	**Bednar** (18)	Globe Life Field	35,565	61–54
116	August 8	Astros	3–5 (10)	Hader (6–2)	**Williams** (3–5)	—	**Yankee Stadium**	46,027	61–55
117	August 9	Astros	5–4	**Bednar** (3–5)	King (3–3)	—	**Yankee Stadium**	45,738	62–55
118	August 10	Astros	1–7	Alexander (3–1)	**Fried** (12–5)	—	**Yankee Stadium**	43,658	62–56
119	August 11	Twins	6–2	**Warren** (7–5)	Matthews (3–4)	—	**Yankee Stadium**	36,744	63–56
120	August 12	Twins	9–1	**Rodón** (12–7)	Adams (1–2)	—	**Yankee Stadium**	37,552	64–56
121	August 13	Twins	1–4	Ryan (12–5)	**De Los Santos** (0–1)	Topa (2)	**Yankee Stadium**	44,466	64–57
122	August 15	@ Cardinals	4–3	**Gil** (1–1)	Pallante (6–10)	**Bednar** (19)	Busch Stadium	31,169	65–57
123	August 16	@ Cardinals	12–8	**Fried** (13–5)	Gray (11–6)	**Bednar** (20)	Busch Stadium	33,800	66–57
124	August 17	@ Cardinals	8–4	**Weaver** (3–3)	Romero (4–5)	—	Busch Stadium	25,365	67–57
125	August 19	@ Rays	13–3	**Rodón** (13–7)	Baz (8–10)	—	George M. Steinbrenner Field	10,046	68–57
126	August 20	@ Rays	6–4 (10)	**Bednar** (4–5)	Fairbanks (4–4)	**Williams** (18)	George M. Steinbrenner Field	10,046	69–57
127	August 21	Red Sox	3–6	Weissert (5–4)	**Weaver** (3–4)	Chapman (23)	**Yankee Stadium**	47,036	69–58
128	August 22	Red Sox	0–1	Bello (10–6)	**Leiter Jr.** (5–7)	Chapman (24)	**Yankee Stadium**	46,064	69–59
129	August 23	Red Sox	1–12	Crochet (14–5)	**Warren** (7–6)	—	**Yankee Stadium**	45,512	69–60
130	August 24	Red Sox	7–2	**Rodón** (14–7)	May (7–10)	—	**Yankee Stadium**	44,640	70–60
131	August 25	Nationals	10–5	**Schlittler** (2–2)	Lord (4–7)	—	**Yankee Stadium**	36,939	71–60
132	August 26	Nationals	5–1	**Gil** (2–1)	Gore (5–13)	—	**Yankee Stadium**	35,531	72–60
133	August 27	Nationals	11–2	**Fried** (14–5)	Cavalli (1–1)	—	**Yankee Stadium**	35,501	73–60
134	August 28	@ White Sox	10–4	**Warren** (8–6)	Alexander (4–12)	—	Rate Field	18,187	74–60
135	August 29	@ White Sox	10–2	**Rodón** (15–7)	Gómez (3–2)	—	Rate Field	28,069	75–60
136	August 30	@ White Sox	5–3 (11)	**Bednar** (5–5)	Alexander (4–13)	**Doval** (16)	Rate Field	26,264	76–60
137	August 31	@ White Sox	2–3	Booser (2–4)	**Hill** (4–4)	Vasil (3)	Rate Field	27,810	76–61

September: 18–7 (Home: 9–3; Road: 9–4)

#	Date	Opponent	Score	Win	Loss	Save	Stadium	Attendance	Record
138	September 2	@ Astros	7–1	**Fried** (15–5)	Valdez (12–8)	—	Daikin Park	33,133	77–61
139	September 3	@ Astros	7–8	King (5–3)	**Williams** (3–6)	—	Daikin Park	30,693	77–62
140	September 4	@ Astros	8–4	**Rodón** (16–7)	Javier (1–2)	—	Daikin Park	35,018	78–62
141	September 5	Blue Jays	1–7	Gausman (9–10)	**Schlittler** (2–3)	—	**Yankee Stadium**	46,055	78–63
142	September 6	Blue Jays	3–1	**Gil** (3–1)	Bassitt (11–8)	**Bednar** (21)	**Yankee Stadium**	45,123	79–63
143	September 7	Blue Jays	4–3	**Fried** (16–5)	Scherzer (5–3)	**Bednar** (22)	**Yankee Stadium**	43,266	80–63
144	September 9	Tigers	2–12	Mize (14–5)	**Cruz** (2–4)	Paddack (1)	**Yankee Stadium**	35,653	80–64
145	September 10	Tigers	1–11	Flaherty (8–13)	**Rodón** (16–8)	—	**Yankee Stadium**	36,727	80–65
146	September 11	Tigers	9–3	**Schlittler** (3–3)	Holton (5–5)	**Yarbrough** (1)	**Yankee Stadium**	40,608	81–65
147	September 12	@ Red Sox	4–1	**Gil** (4–1)	Giolito (10–4)	**Bednar** (23)	Fenway Park	36,760	82–65
148	September 13	@ Red Sox	5–3	**Fried** (17–5)	Bello (11–7)	**Bednar** (24)	Fenway Park	36,135	83–65
149	September 14	@ Red Sox	4–6	Crochet (16–5)	**Warren** (8–7)	Chapman (30)	Fenway Park	35,437	83–66
150	September 15	@ Twins	0–7	Woods Richardson (7–4)	**Rodón** (16–9)	—	Target Field	22,001	83–67
151	September 16	@ Twins	10–9	**Leiter Jr.** (6–7)	Matthews (4–6)	**Bednar** (25)	Target Field	25,500	84–67
152	September 17	@ Twins	10–5	**Cruz** (3–4)	Bradley (6–8)	—	Target Field	20,206	85–67
153	September 18	@ Orioles	7–0	**Fried** (18–5)	Povich (3–8)	—	Camden Yards	25,253	86–67
154	September 19	@ Orioles	2–4	Rogers (9–2)	**Warren** (8–8)	Akin (8)	Camden Yards	26,269	86–68
155	September 20	@ Orioles	6–1	**Rodón** (17–9)	Sugano (10–9)	—	Camden Yards	37,675	87–68
156	September 21	@ Orioles	7–1 (10)	**Bednar** (6–5)	Strowd (0–1)	―	Camden Yards	31,974	88–68
157	September 23	White Sox	3–2	**Weaver** (4–4)	Eisert (3–7)	—	**Yankee Stadium**	38,318	89–68
158	September 24	White Sox	8–1	**Fried** (19–5)	Cannon (4–10)	—	**Yankee Stadium**	37,751	90–68
159	September 25	White Sox	5–3	**Rodón** (18–9)	Gilbert (4–2)	**Bednar** (26)	**Yankee Stadium**	38,545	91–68
160	September 26	Orioles	8–4	**Warren** (9–8)	Rogers (9–3)	—	**Yankee Stadium**	44,596	92–68
161	September 27	Orioles	6–1	**Schlittler** (4–3)	Sugano (10–10)	—	**Yankee Stadium**	46,085	93–68
162	September 28	Orioles	3–2	**Williams** (4–6)	Garcia (0–2)	**Bednar** (27)	**Yankee Stadium**	45,004	94–68

== Postseason ==
=== Postseason game log ===
2025 Postseason game log (3–4) (Home 3–2; Away 0−2)
American League Wild Card Series: 2–1

#	Date	Opponent	Stadium	Score	Win	Loss	Save	Attendance	Record
1	September 30	Red Sox	Yankee Stadium	1–3	Crochet (1–0)	Weaver (0–1)	Chapman (1)	47,027	0–1
2	October 1	Red Sox	Yankee Stadium	4–3	Williams (1–0)	Whitlock (0–1)	Bednar (1)	47,993	1–1
3	October 2	Red Sox	Yankee Stadium	4–0	Schlittler (1–0)	Early (0–1)	―	48,833	2–1

American League Division Series: 1–3

#	Date	Opponent	Stadium	Score	Win	Loss	Save	Attendance	Record
1	October 4	@ Blue Jays	Rogers Centre	1–10	Gausman (1–0)	Gil (0–1)	―	44,655	0–1
2	October 5	@ Blue Jays	Rogers Centre	7–13	Yesavage (1–0)	Fried (0–1)	―	44,764	0–2
3	October 7	Blue Jays	Yankee Stadium	9–6	Hill (1–0)	Varland (0–1)	Bednar (2)	47,399	1–2
4	October 8	Blue Jays	Yankee Stadium	2–5	Domínguez (1–0)	Schlittler (1–1)	Hoffman (1)	47,823	1–3

=== Postseason rosters ===
Playoff rosters
American League Wild Card Series

- Pitchers: 30 Luke Weaver 31 Cam Schlittler 38 Devin Williams 41 Tim Hill 53 David Bednar 54 Max Fried 55 Carlos Rodón 56 Mark Leiter Jr. 58 Paul Blackburn 63 Fernando Cruz 75 Camilo Doval 98 Will Warren
- Catchers: 25 J. C. Escarra 28 Austin Wells
- Infielders: 11 Anthony Volpe 13 Jazz Chisholm Jr. 14 Amed Rosario 19 Ryan McMahon 22 Ben Rice 48 Paul Goldschmidt 72 José Caballero
- Outfielders: 12 Trent Grisham 24 Jasson Domínguez 35 Cody Bellinger 99 Aaron Judge
- Designated hitters: 27 Giancarlo Stanton

American League Division Series

- Pitchers: 30 Luke Weaver 31 Cam Schlittler 38 Devin Williams 41 Tim Hill 53 David Bednar 54 Max Fried 55 Carlos Rodón 58 Paul Blackburn 63 Fernando Cruz 75 Camilo Doval 81 Luis Gil 98 Will Warren
- Catchers: 25 J. C. Escarra 28 Austin Wells
- Infielders: 11 Anthony Volpe 13 Jazz Chisholm Jr. 14 Amed Rosario 19 Ryan McMahon 22 Ben Rice 48 Paul Goldschmidt 72 José Caballero
- Outfielders: 12 Trent Grisham 24 Jasson Domínguez 35 Cody Bellinger 99 Aaron Judge
- Designated hitters: 27 Giancarlo Stanton

== Roster ==
2025 New York Yankees
Roster
Pitchers: 53 David Bednar; 29 Clayton Beeter; 59 Jake Bird; 58 Paul Blackburn; 34 JT Brubaker; 59 Carlos Carrasco; 63 Fernando Cruz; 73 Yerry De Los Santos; 75 Camilo Doval; 57 Scott Effross; 54 Max Fried; 50 Rico Garcia; 81 Luis Gil; 94 Yoendrys Gómez; 71 Ian Hamilton; 64 Geoff Hartlieb; 47 Brent Headrick; 41 Tim Hill; 56 Mark Leiter Jr.; 43 Jonathan Loáisiga; 68 Tyler Matzek; 58 Adam Ottavino; 55 Carlos Rodón; 88 Jayvien Sandridge; 31 Cam Schlittler; 36 Clarke Schmidt; 0 Marcus Stroman; 98 Will Warren; 30 Luke Weaver; 38 Devin Williams; 62 Allan Winans; 33 Ryan Yarbrough	Catchers: 25 J. C. Escarra; 28 Austin Wells; Infielders: 72 José Caballero; 95 Oswaldo Cabrera; 13 Jazz Chisholm Jr.; 48 Paul Goldschmidt; 26 DJ LeMahieu; 19 Ryan McMahon; 18 Oswald Peraza; 19 Pablo Reyes; 22 Ben Rice; 14 Amed Rosario; 90 Jorbit Vivas; 11 Anthony Volpe	Outfielders: 35 Cody Bellinger; 24 Jasson Domínguez; 12 Trent Grisham; 99 Aaron Judge; 29 Austin Slater; 27 Giancarlo Stanton	Manager: 17 Aaron Boone; Coaches: 65 Brad Ausmus (bench); 77 Matt Blake (pitching); 70 Travis Chapman (first base/infield); 79 Preston Claiborne (assistant pitching); 78 Casey Dykes (assistant hitting); 60 Mike Harkey (bullpen); 66 Pat Roessler (assistant hitting); 67 Luis Rojas (third base/outfield); 82 James Rowson (hitting); -- Peter Serruto (bullpen catcher); 76 Tanner Swanson (quality control/catching)

== Player stats ==
= Indicates team leader

= Indicates league leader

=== Batting ===
Note: G = Games played; AB = At bats; R = Runs scored; H = Hits; 2B = Doubles; 3B = Triples; HR = Home runs; RBI = Runs batted in; SB = Stolen bases; BB = Walks; AVG = Batting average; SLG = Slugging average

Player	G	AB	R	H	2B	3B	HR	RBI	SB	BB	AVG	SLG
Cody Bellinger	152	588	89	160	25	5	29	98	13	57	.272	.480
Aaron Judge	152	541	137	179	30	2	53	114	12	124	.331	.688
Anthony Volpe	153	539	65	114	32	4	19	72	18	43	.212	.391
Trent Grisham	143	494	87	116	9	1	34	74	3	82	.235	.464
Paul Goldschmidt	145	489	76	134	31	1	10	45	5	36	.274	.403
Ben Rice	138	467	74	119	28	4	26	65	3	50	.255	.499
Jazz Chisholm Jr.	130	462	75	112	15	1	31	80	31	58	.242	.481
Austin Wells	126	401	51	88	22	1	21	71	5	30	.219	.436
Jasson Domínguez	123	381	58	98	18	1	10	47	23	41	.257	.388
Giancarlo Stanton	77	249	36	68	8	0	24	66	0	29	.273	.594
Ryan McMahon	54	159	20	33	8	0	4	18	1	21	.208	.333
Oswald Peraza	71	158	18	24	5	0	3	13	3	11	.152	.241
DJ LeMahieu	45	128	13	34	3	0	2	12	0	14	.266	.336
Oswaldo Cabrera	34	107	17	26	4	0	1	11	0	11	.243	.308
J.C. Escarra	40	84	5	17	5	0	2	11	1	11	.202	.333
José Caballero	40	79	15	21	6	0	3	9	15	14	.266	.456
Jorbit Vivas	29	56	6	9	2	0	1	5	0	5	.161	.250
Amed Rosario	16	33	1	10	3	0	1	5	0	0	.303	.485
Pablo Reyes	24	31	4	6	1	0	0	2	1	2	.194	.226
Austin Slater	14	25	2	3	0	0	0	2	0	0	.120	.120
Totals	162	5471	849	1371	255	20	274	820	134	639	.251	.455

Source:Baseball Reference

=== Pitching ===
Note: W = Wins; L = Losses; ERA = Earned run average; G = Games pitched; GS = Games started; SV = Saves; IP = Innings pitched; H = Hits allowed; R = Runs allowed; ER = Earned runs allowed; BB = Walks allowed; SO = Strikeouts

Player	W	L	ERA	G	GS	SV	IP	H	R	ER	BB	SO
Carlos Rodón	18	9	3.09	33	33	0	195.1	132	74	67	73	203
Max Fried	19	5	2.86	32	32	0	195.1	164	73	62	51	189
Will Warren	9	8	4.44	33	33	0	162.1	158	90	80	65	171
Clarke Schmidt	4	4	3.32	14	14	0	78.2	56	29	29	30	73
Cam Schlittler	4	3	2.96	14	14	0	73.0	58	24	24	31	84
Tim Hill	4	4	3.09	70	0	0	67.0	58	27	23	16	37
Luke Weaver	4	4	3.62	64	0	8	64.2	46	28	26	20	72
Ryan Yarbrough	3	1	4.36	19	8	1	64.0	58	31	31	19	55
Devin Williams	4	6	4.79	67	0	18	62.0	45	37	33	25	90
Luis Gil	4	1	3.32	11	11	0	57.0	47	23	21	33	41
Mark Leiter Jr.	6	7	4.84	59	0	2	48.1	57	31	26	17	54
Fernando Cruz	3	4	3.56	49	0	2	48.0	33	21	19	24	72
Ian Hamilton	2	1	4.28	36	1	0	40.0	28	20	19	22	42
Marcus Stroman	3	2	6.23	9	9	0	39.0	44	27	27	16	26
Yerry De Los Santos	0	1	3.28	25	0	0	35.2	37	15	13	17	28
Carlos Carrasco	2	2	5.91	8	6	0	32.0	39	21	21	10	25
Jonathan Loáisiga	0	1	4.25	30	0	1	29.2	34	15	14	10	25
David Bednar	4	0	2.19	22	0	10	24.2	14	6	6	9	35
Brent Headrick	0	0	3.13	17	0	0	23.0	17	8	8	7	30
Camilo Doval	0	1	4.82	22	0	1	18.2	19	14	10	11	22
JT Brubaker	0	0	3.38	12	0	0	16.0	10	6	6	9	10
Paul Blackburn	0	0	5.28	8	0	0	15.1	16	10	9	4	16
Scott Effross	0	0	8.44	11	0	0	10.2	16	10	10	3	6
Yoendrys Gómez	1	1	2.70	6	0	0	10.0	5	4	3	9	5
Allan Winans	0	1	8.68	3	1	0	9.1	13	11	9	3	6
Tyler Matzek	0	0	4.26	7	0	0	6.1	11	3	3	5	7
Clayton Beeter	0	1	14.73	2	0	0	3.2	5	6	6	4	1
Rico Garcia	0	0	10.13	1	0	0	2.2	3	3	3	2	2
Jake Bird	0	1	27.00	3	0	0	2.0	4	7	6	2	4
Adam Ottavino	0	0	0.00	3	0	0	1.2	0	0	0	4	3
Geoff Hartlieb	0	0	40.50	2	0	0	1.1	5	6	6	4	4
Pablo Reyes	0	0	27.00	1	0	0	1.0	5	3	3	0	0
Jayvien Sandridge	0	0	27.00	1	0	0	0.2	1	2	2	2	2
Austin Slater	0	0	0.00	1	0	0	0.2	1	0	0	0	0
Totals	94	68	3.91	162	162	43	1439.2	1239	685	625	557	1440

Source:Baseball Reference

== Farm system ==
Minor-league coaching assignments were announced on January 24.

Level	Team	League	Manager
AAA	Scranton/Wilkes-Barre RailRiders	International League	Shelley Duncan
AA	Somerset Patriots	Eastern League	Raul Dominguez
High-A	Hudson Valley Renegades	South Atlantic League	James Cooper
Low-A	Tampa Tarpons	Florida State League	Aaron Bossi
Rookie	FCL Yankees	Florida Complex League	
Rookie	DSL NYY Bombers	Dominican Summer League	
Rookie	DSL NYY Yankees	Dominican Summer League	
