= 2025 American League Wild Card Series =

Teams
| Team (Wins) | | Manager | Season |
| Detroit Tigers (2) | | A. J. Hinch | 87–75 (.537), GB: 1 |
| Cleveland Guardians (1) | | Stephen Vogt | 88–74 (.543), GA: 1 |
- Dates: September 30 – October 2
- Television: ESPN (Games 1 & 2); ABC (Game 3)
- TV announcers: Sean McDonough, Todd Frazier, and Taylor McGregor
- Radio: ESPN
- Radio announcers: Mike Ferrin and Kyle Peterson
- Umpires: Adam Beck, Vic Carapazza (crew chief), Shane Livensparger, David Rackley, Stu Scheurwater, Carlos Torres

Teams
| Team (Wins) | | Manager | Season |
| New York Yankees (2) | | Aaron Boone | 94–68 (.580), GB: 0 |
| Boston Red Sox (1) | | Alex Cora | 89–73 (.549), GB: 5 |
- Dates: September 30 – October 2
- Television: ESPN
- TV announcers: Karl Ravech, David Cone, Eduardo Pérez, and Buster Olney
- Radio: ESPN
- Radio announcers: Roxy Bernstein and Gregg Olson
- Umpires: Scott Barry, Dan Iassogna (crew chief), John Libka, Gabe Morales, Mark Ripperger, Junior Valentine

The 2025 American League Wild Card Series were the two best-of-three playoff series in Major League Baseball’s (MLB) 2025 postseason to determine the participating teams of the 2025 American League Division Series (ALDS). Both Wild Card Series began on September 30, with Game 2s scheduled for October 1. ESPN was the broadcaster for most of both series (except for Game 3 of the Guardians vs Tigers series which was on ABC) in the United States, together with ESPN Radio.

These matchups were:

- (3) Cleveland Guardians (AL Central champions) vs. (6) Detroit Tigers (third wild card): Tigers won the series, 2–1.
- (4) New York Yankees (first wild card) vs. (5) Boston Red Sox (second wild card): Yankees won the series, 2–1.

== Background ==
The lowest-seeded division winner and three wild-card teams in each league play in a best-of-three series after the end of the regular season. The winners of each league's wild card rounds advance to face the two best division winners in that league's Division Series. The Houston Astros failed to qualify for the postseason for the first time since 2016, ending the second-longest consecutive postseason streak in MLB.

Entering the final day of the season, the American League East and American League Central had yet to be decided. The Toronto Blue Jays and New York Yankees, who both had at least a 6 1/2-game lead atop the American League East division at one point this season, were tied at 93–68. The Blue Jays won the season series 8–5, thus holding the head-to-head tiebreaker, so the Yankees must finish ahead of them to win the AL East division. The winner of the AL East division will have home-field advantage throughout the American League postseason as the top seed, while the runner-up will have to play against the fifth-seeded team (also undetermined as of the start of the final day the season) at home in the Wild Card Series. In the American League Central division, the Detroit Tigers were trying to salvage a division they once led by 15 1/2 games. The Cleveland Guardians, who themselves were 10 1/2 games back of the Tigers on August 31, entered the final day of the season tied for the division lead at 87–74. If both teams finished tied, the Guardians would win the division due to owning the head-to-head tiebreaker against the Tigers. The winner of the AL Central division would be the third seed and have home-field advantage for the Wild Card Series and the runner-up would start their postseason on the road.

The results of the final day of the season: The Blue Jays and Yankees both won, thus giving the Blue Jays the AL East, a first-round bye, and home-field advantage throughout the AL playoffs. In the AL Central, the Guardians won, while the Tigers lost, giving Cleveland the AL Central title.

The Cleveland Guardians (88–74) clinched their eighth postseason berth in the last ten seasons on September 27 and won the AL Central after a Detroit Tigers loss to the Boston Red Sox on September 28, followed by their own win against the Texas Rangers. They were locked into the three seed as they had the worst record among AL division winners. They played host to their divisional rivals, the Detroit Tigers (87–75), who clinched a postseason berth on September 27. The Guardians won the season series, 8–5. This was a rematch of the ALDS match-up from last year that the Guardians won in five games.

The New York Yankees (94–68) clinched their second consecutive playoff berth (and eighth playoff berth in nine seasons) on September 23, but failed to clinch the AL East after the Blue Jays won. They hosted their archrivals, the Boston Red Sox (89–73), who clinched their first postseason appearance since the 2021 season with a Ceddanne Rafaela walk-off triple against the Detroit Tigers on September 26. The Red Sox won the season series, 9–4. This was the sixth Yankees–Red Sox playoff matchup, with the most recent being a Red Sox's Wild Card Game win in 2021.

As the top two seeds, the Toronto Blue Jays (94–68) and Seattle Mariners (90–72) earned a first-round bye and have home-field advantage in the ALDS. Just seven games separated the top-seeded Blue Jays and the sixth-seeded Tigers in the standings.

== Matchups ==
=== Cleveland Guardians vs. Detroit Tigers ===
Detroit won the series, 2–1.

| Game | Date | Score | Location | Time | Attendance |
|---|---|---|---|---|---|
| 1 | September 30 | Detroit Tigers – 2, Cleveland Guardians – 1 | Progressive Field | 2:34 | 26,186 |
| 2 | October 1 | Detroit Tigers – 1, Cleveland Guardians – 6 | Progressive Field | 3:12 | 26,669 |
| 3 | October 2 | Detroit Tigers – 6, Cleveland Guardians – 3 | Progressive Field | 2:50 | 29,891 |

=== New York Yankees vs. Boston Red Sox ===
New York won the series, 2–1.

| Game | Date | Score | Location | Time | Attendance |
|---|---|---|---|---|---|
| 1 | September 30 | Boston Red Sox – 3, New York Yankees – 1 | Yankee Stadium | 3:04 | 47,027 |
| 2 | October 1 | Boston Red Sox – 3, New York Yankees – 4 | Yankee Stadium | 2:50 | 47,993 |
| 3 | October 2 | Boston Red Sox – 0, New York Yankees – 4 | Yankee Stadium | 2:30 | 48,833 |

== Cleveland vs. Detroit ==
This is the second postseason match-up between the Cleveland Guardians and Detroit Tigers. Last year, the Guardians defeated the Tigers in the American League Division Series in five games.

=== Game 1 ===
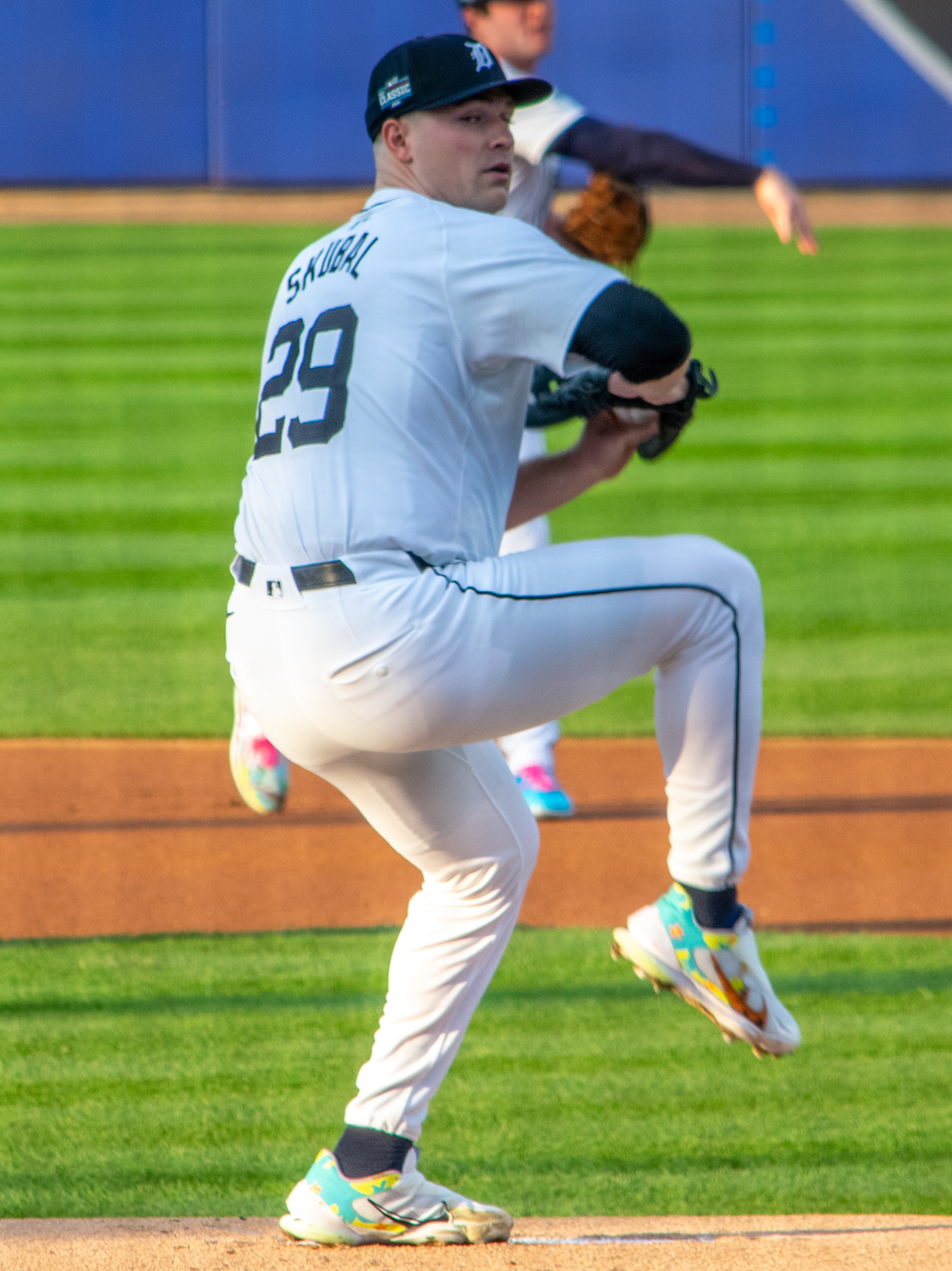
Tarik Skubal struck out 14 hitters in Game 1.

September 30, 2025 1:08 pm (EDT) at Progressive Field in Cleveland, Ohio 75 °F (24 °C), Sunny
| Team | 1 | 2 | 3 | 4 | 5 | 6 | 7 | 8 | 9 | R | H | E |
|---|---|---|---|---|---|---|---|---|---|---|---|---|
| Detroit | 1 | 0 | 0 | 0 | 0 | 0 | 1 | 0 | 0 | 2 | 5 | 1 |
| Cleveland | 0 | 0 | 0 | 1 | 0 | 0 | 0 | 0 | 0 | 1 | 4 | 2 |
WP: Tarik Skubal (1–0) LP: Gavin Williams (0–1) Sv: Will Vest (1); Attendance: 26,186; Boxscore

In the top of the first inning, Spencer Torkelson hit a RBI single to left field to give the Tigers a 1–0 lead. In the bottom of the fourth inning, the Guardians tied the score when Gabriel Arias hit a RBI single off Tarik Skubal after a tag play was challenged and overturned. In the top of the seventh inning, the Tigers took the lead back after Zach McKinstry hit a sacrifice bunt, scoring Riley Greene from third to give the Tigers a 2–1 lead. Tarik Skubal threw 7 2/3 innings, allowing just one run, and striking out a career-high 14 in his performance against the Guardians. Will Vest got the save for the Tigers after going 1 1/3 innings, allowing just one hit and striking out one batter. Shortstop Javier Báez got the final out of the game when C. J. Kayfus hit a pop fly to him in shallow left field.

=== Game 2 ===
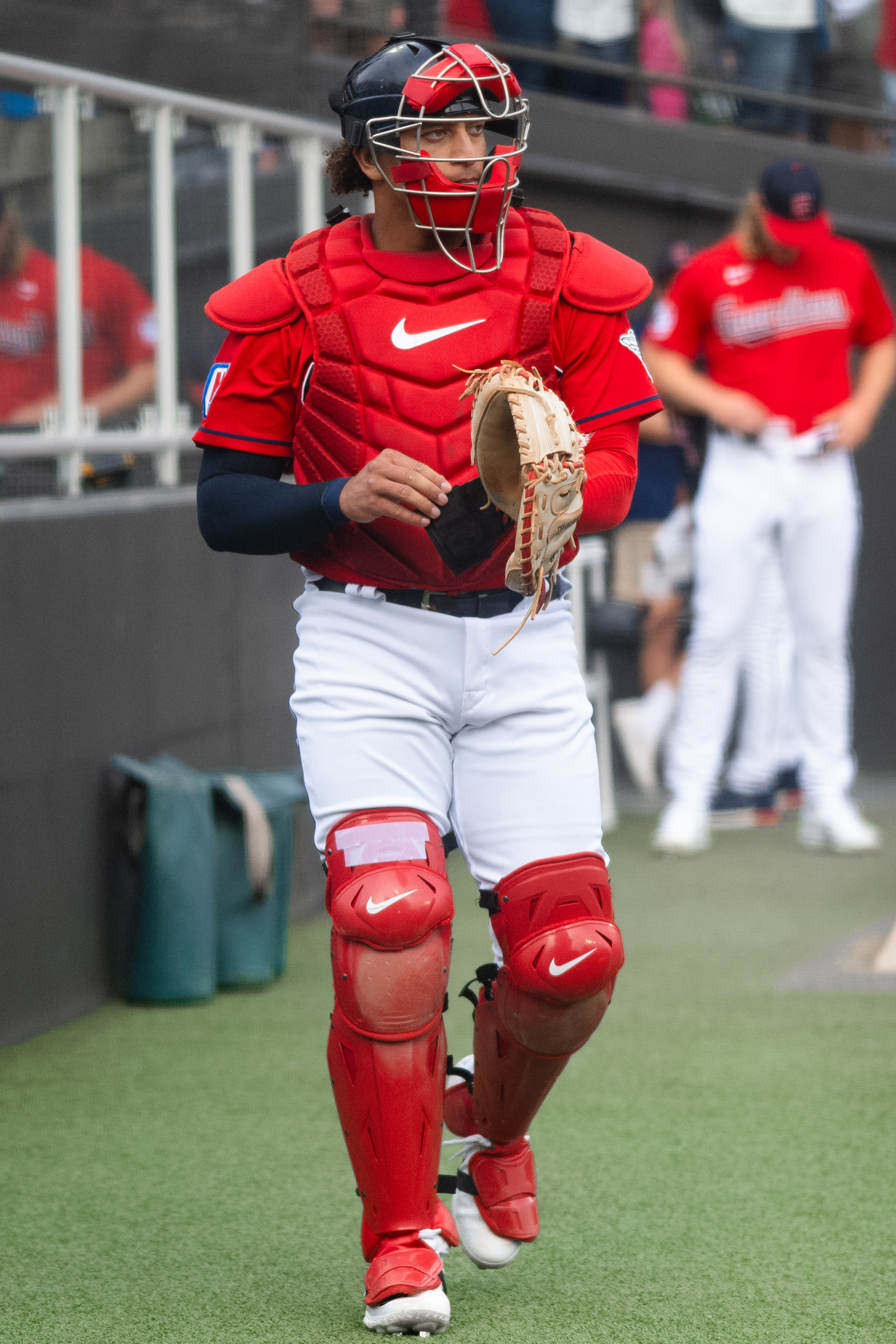
Bo Naylor hit a three-run home run in Game 2.

October 1, 2025 1:08 pm (EDT) at Progressive Field in Cleveland, Ohio 71 °F (22 °C), Sunny
| Team | 1 | 2 | 3 | 4 | 5 | 6 | 7 | 8 | 9 | R | H | E |
|---|---|---|---|---|---|---|---|---|---|---|---|---|
| Detroit | 0 | 0 | 0 | 1 | 0 | 0 | 0 | 0 | 0 | 1 | 7 | 0 |
| Cleveland | 1 | 0 | 0 | 0 | 0 | 0 | 0 | 5 | X | 6 | 6 | 2 |
WP: Cade Smith (1−0) LP: Troy Melton (0−1); Home runs: DET: None; CLE: George Valera (1), Brayan Rocchio (1), Bo Naylor (1); Attendance: 26,669; Boxscore

In the bottom of the first inning, George Valera hit a solo home run to give the Guardians a 1−0 lead. In the top of the fourth inning, Riley Greene scored on a bases loaded Javier Báez single, tying the game at 1−1. Dillon Dingler scored behind Greene, but Cleveland challenged Zach McKinstry's safe call at third base. The call was overturned, which resulted in Dingler not scoring on the play, as he had not reached home plate before McKinstry was tagged out. Tigers pitcher Casey Mize exited the game after three innings, giving up one run while striking out only one batter. Tanner Bibee pitched 4 2/3 innings as he allowed five hits and one earned run while striking out six. In the bottom of the eighth, Brayan Rocchio hit a solo home run off Troy Melton for the Guardians to retake the lead at 2–1, followed by Daniel Schneemann hitting an RBI double, and a three-run home run by Bo Naylor to extend the Guardians' lead to 6–1. C. J. Kayfus got the final out of the game as Dillon Dingler lined out with the bases loaded. The series is now tied and Game 3 will be the second consecutive winner-take-all game between the two teams in as many seasons.

According to Sarah Langs, Rocchio hit the first go-ahead home run in the eighth inning or later when facing elimination in Cleveland postseason history. The Tigers left 15 runners on base in the game.

=== Game 3 ===
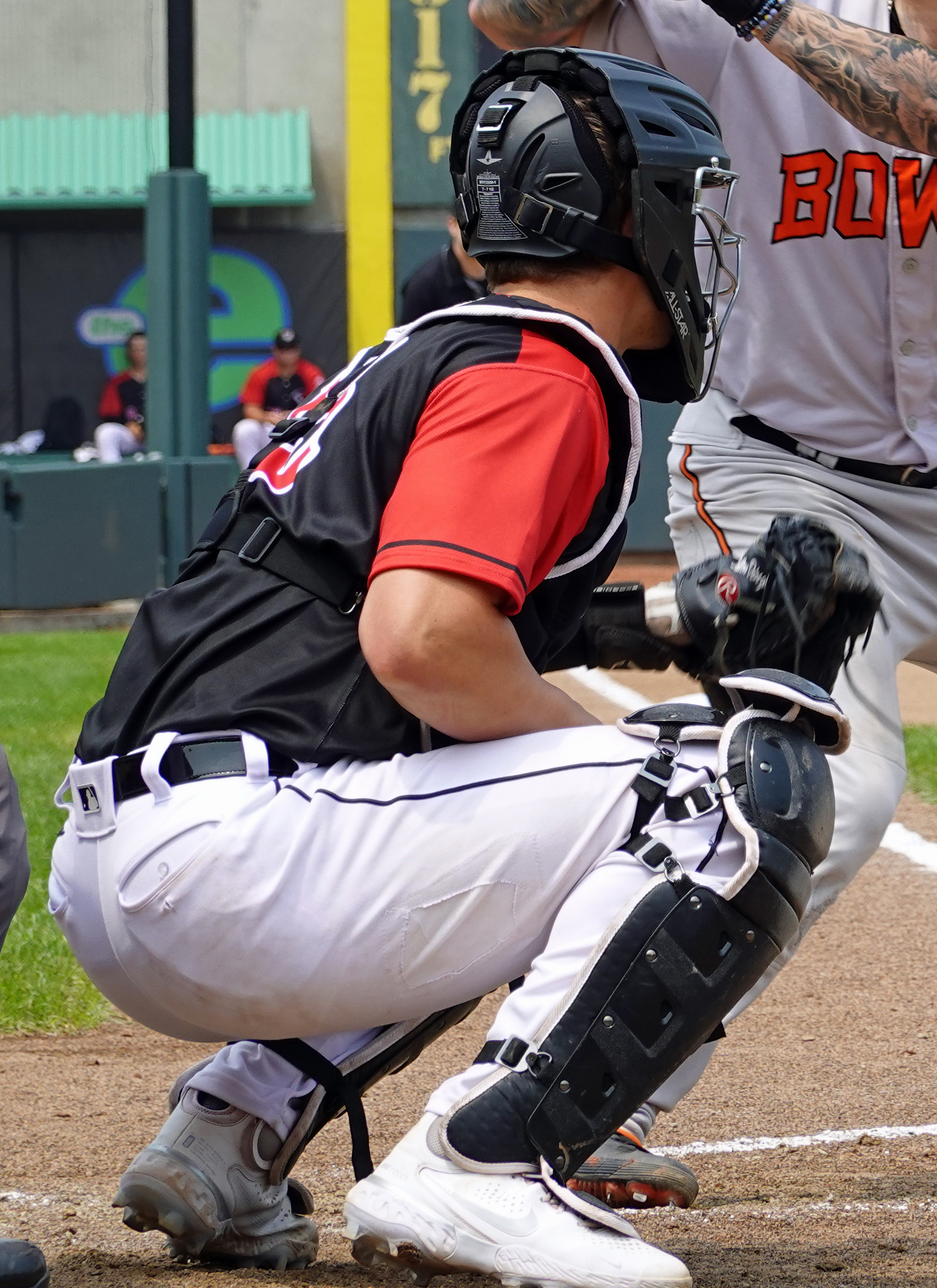
Ohio native Dillon Dingler hit a solo home run in Game 3.

October 2, 2025 3:08 pm (EDT) at Progressive Field in Cleveland, Ohio 75 °F (24 °C), Partly Cloudy
| Team | 1 | 2 | 3 | 4 | 5 | 6 | 7 | 8 | 9 | R | H | E |
|---|---|---|---|---|---|---|---|---|---|---|---|---|
| Detroit | 0 | 0 | 1 | 0 | 0 | 1 | 4 | 0 | 0 | 6 | 10 | 1 |
| Cleveland | 0 | 0 | 0 | 1 | 0 | 0 | 0 | 2 | 0 | 3 | 6 | 0 |
WP: Kyle Finnegan (1–0) LP: Joey Cantillo (0–1); Home runs: DET: Dillon Dingler (1); CLE: None; Attendance: 29,891; Boxscore

In the top of the third inning, Parker Meadows scored on an RBI double by Kerry Carpenter, giving the Tigers a 1−0 lead. Slade Cecconi pitched 2 1/3 innings, allowing just two hits and one run while striking out three batters. In the bottom of the fourth inning, the Guardians tied the game 1−1, when George Valera scored on an RBI single by José Ramírez. Jack Flaherty pitched 4 2/3 innings, allowing three hits and one run while striking out four batters. Dillon Dingler hit a solo home run off Joey Cantillo in the top of the sixth inning to give the Tigers a 2−1 lead. Cantillo pitched 2 2/3 innings, allowing two hits and one run while striking out three batters. In the top of the seventh inning, the Tigers extended their lead to 4−1, when Javier Báez and Meadows scored on a Wenceel Pérez RBI single. Later in the inning, Carpenter scored on an RBI single by Spencer Torkelson, pushing the Tigers' lead to 5−1. Pérez completed the Tigers scoring when he ran home on an RBI single by Riley Greene for a 6−1 lead. Erik Sabrowski and Hunter Gaddis combined to pitch only 2/3 innings, where they allowed five hits and four runs while striking out no batters. Tigers reliever Tommy Kahnle allowed one-out hits to Brayan Rocchio and Steven Kwan, putting runners on second and third in the bottom of the eighth inning. The two scored with two outs when José Ramírez reached base on a fielding error by Will Vest, cutting the Tigers' lead down to 6−3. However, Vest threw out Ramírez when he tried to advance to second base on the error, ending the inning with no further damage. Vest closed out the series for the Tigers with a 1−2−3 ninth inning. The Tigers won the series 2−1, and advanced to the ALDS to face the Seattle Mariners.

This was the Tigers’ first postseason victory over a team from their current division since winning the American League pennant in 1984.

=== Composite line score ===
2025 ALWC (2–1): Detroit Tigers beat Cleveland Guardians

| Team | 1 | 2 | 3 | 4 | 5 | 6 | 7 | 8 | 9 | R | H | E |
|---|---|---|---|---|---|---|---|---|---|---|---|---|
| Detroit Tigers | 1 | 0 | 1 | 1 | 0 | 1 | 5 | 0 | 0 | 9 | 22 | 2 |
| Cleveland Guardians | 1 | 0 | 0 | 2 | 0 | 0 | 0 | 7 | 0 | 10 | 16 | 4 |
Total attendance: 82,746 Average attendance: 27,582

== New York vs. Boston ==
This is the sixth postseason meeting between the Boston Red Sox and the New York Yankees. The Yankees won the first two match-ups: the 1999 American League Championship Series and the 2003 American League Championship Series; while the Red Sox have won the last three: the 2004 American League Championship Series, the 2018 American League Division Series, and the 2021 American League Wild Card Game.

=== Game 1 ===
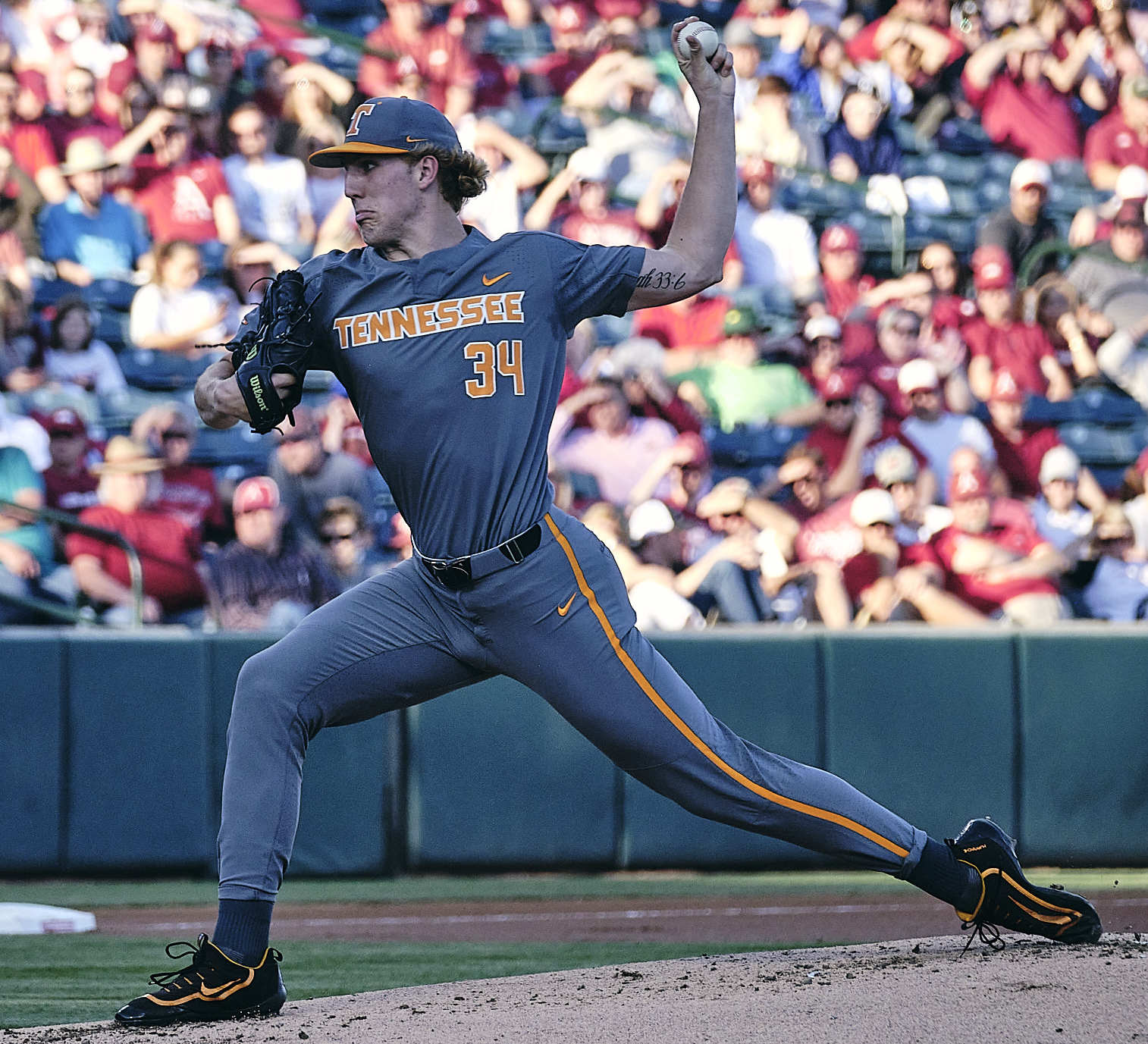
Garrett Crochet, pictured here with Tennessee, struck out 11 hitters in Game 1.

September 30, 2025 6:08 pm (EDT) at Yankee Stadium in The Bronx, New York 77 °F (25 °C), Partly Cloudy
| Team | 1 | 2 | 3 | 4 | 5 | 6 | 7 | 8 | 9 | R | H | E |
|---|---|---|---|---|---|---|---|---|---|---|---|---|
| Boston | 0 | 0 | 0 | 0 | 0 | 0 | 2 | 0 | 1 | 3 | 8 | 0 |
| New York | 0 | 1 | 0 | 0 | 0 | 0 | 0 | 0 | 0 | 1 | 7 | 0 |
WP: Garrett Crochet (1–0) LP: Luke Weaver (0–1) Sv: Aroldis Chapman (1); Home runs: BOS: None; NYY: Anthony Volpe (1); Attendance: 47,027; Boxscore

In the bottom of the second inning, Anthony Volpe hit a solo home run off Garrett Crochet to give the Yankees a 1−0 lead. In the top of the fourth inning, Max Fried got out of a jam by striking out Jarren Duran as runners were on second and third bases to keep the one-run Yankees lead. Fried had a good outing, allowing four hits but didn't allow any runs at all and striking out six batters in 6 1/3 shutout innings. He also became the first pitcher with a scoreless start of six-plus innings in a Yankee playoff debut since Mike Mussina in the 2001 ALDS, per Sarah Langs. In the top of the seventh, Masataka Yoshida hit a two-RBI single to give the Red Sox a 2−1 lead. In the top of the ninth inning, Alex Bregman hit an RBI single to extend the Red Sox's lead to 3−1. Garrett Crochet pitched 7 2/3 innings as he allowed four hits and one earned run while striking out 11. Aroldis Chapman earned the save, escaping the bases-loaded jam with no outs in the bottom of the ninth, preserving a 3–1 win as the Red Sox got their 13th postseason victory over their arch rivals.

According to OptaSTATS, the Yankees were the first team in MLB postseason history to have the bases loaded with nobody out in the bottom of the ninth but not score a run and lose the game.

=== Game 2 ===
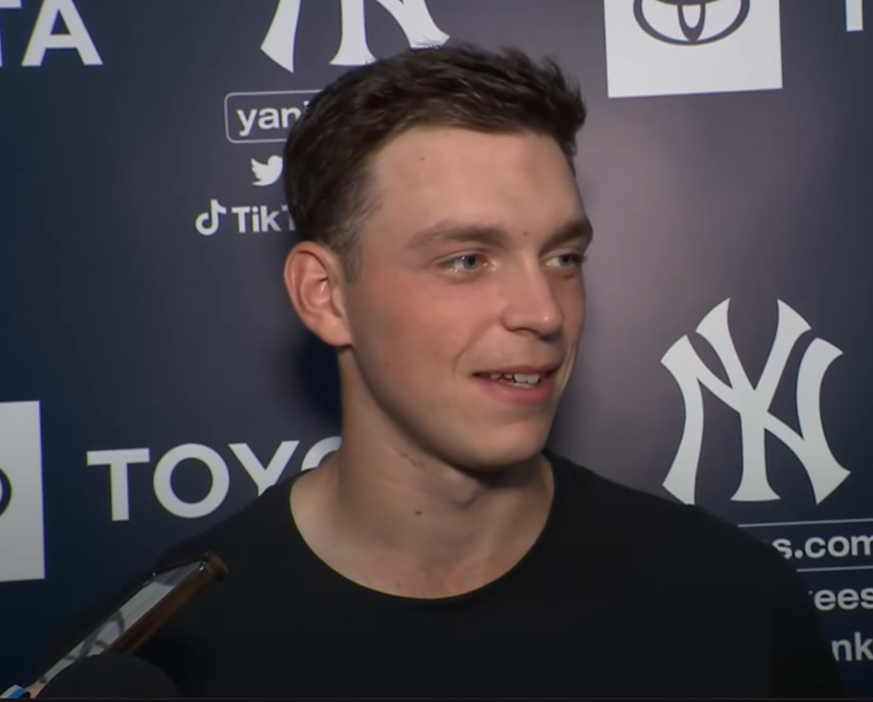
Ben Rice hit a two-run home run in the first inning of Game 2.

October 1, 2025 6:08 pm (EDT) at Yankee Stadium in The Bronx, New York 68 °F (20 °C), Clear
| Team | 1 | 2 | 3 | 4 | 5 | 6 | 7 | 8 | 9 | R | H | E |
|---|---|---|---|---|---|---|---|---|---|---|---|---|
| Boston | 0 | 0 | 2 | 0 | 0 | 1 | 0 | 0 | 0 | 3 | 6 | 0 |
| New York | 2 | 0 | 0 | 0 | 1 | 0 | 0 | 1 | X | 4 | 10 | 1 |
WP: Devin Williams (1–0) LP: Garrett Whitlock (0–1) Sv: David Bednar (1); Home runs: BOS: Trevor Story (1); NYY: Ben Rice (1); Attendance: 47,993; Boxscore

In the bottom of the first inning, Ben Rice hit a two-run home run off Brayan Bello to give the Yankees a 2−0 lead. In the top of the third inning, Trevor Story hit a two-RBI single to score Jarren Duran and Ceddanne Rafaela, tying the game at 2−2. Bello only pitched 2 1/3 innings, giving up four hits and two runs while striking out zero batters. Trent Grisham scored on a two-out RBI single by Aaron Judge in the bottom of the fifth inning to give the Yankees a 3−2 lead. In the top of the sixth inning, Story hit a solo home run to tie the game at 3–3. Rodón pitched six innings, giving up four hits and three runs while striking out six batters. Yankees relief pitcher Fernando Cruz escaped a bases-loaded jam to end the top of the seventh inning after Story got out via a fly out to center field. Austin Wells hit a two-out RBI single to score Jazz Chisholm Jr. in the bottom of the eighth inning. David Bednar got the save with a perfect inning as the Yankees got the victory, and even the series to force a winner-take-all Game 3.

=== Game 3 ===
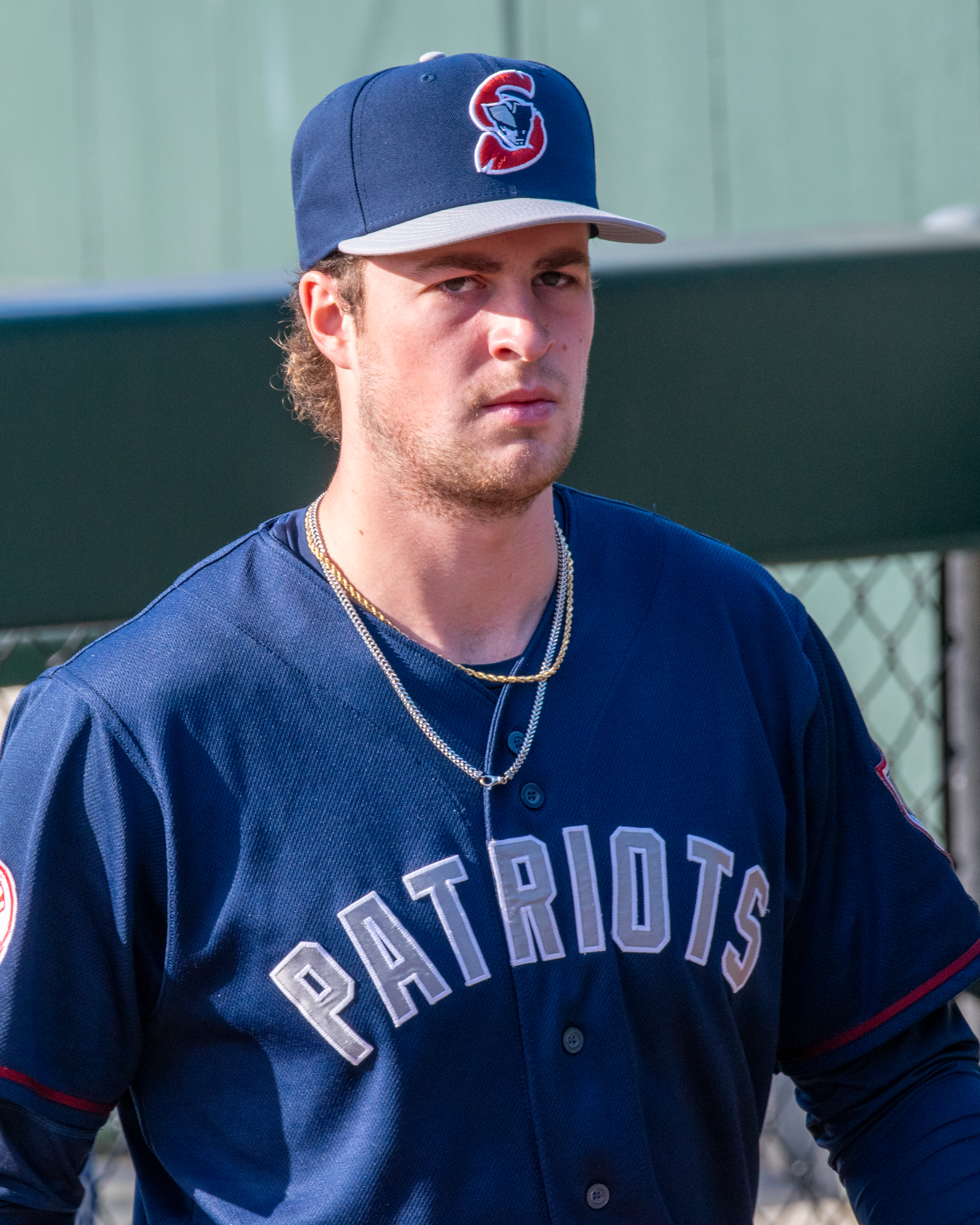
Cam Schlittler, pictured here with the Somerset Patriots, struck out 12 hitters in Game 3.

October 2, 2025 8:08 pm (EDT) at Yankee Stadium in The Bronx, New York 60 °F (16 °C), Clear
| Team | 1 | 2 | 3 | 4 | 5 | 6 | 7 | 8 | 9 | R | H | E |
|---|---|---|---|---|---|---|---|---|---|---|---|---|
| Boston | 0 | 0 | 0 | 0 | 0 | 0 | 0 | 0 | 0 | 0 | 5 | 2 |
| New York | 0 | 0 | 0 | 4 | 0 | 0 | 0 | 0 | X | 4 | 8 | 1 |
WP: Cam Schlittler (1–0) LP: Connelly Early (0–1); Attendance: 48,833; Boxscore

In the bottom of the fourth inning, Cody Bellinger scored by an RBI single from Amed Rosario to give the Yankees a 1–0 lead. Giancarlo Stanton then scored by an RBI single from Anthony Volpe to extend the Yankees' lead to 2–0. Rosario and Jazz Chisholm Jr. scored when Austin Wells reached base on a fielding error by Nathaniel Lowe, extending the Yankees' lead to 4–0. Red Sox starting pitcher Connelly Early pitched 3 2/3 innings, allowing six hits and four runs (three earned runs) while striking out six batters. He became the youngest pitcher to start a postseason game since Babe Ruth, per MLB's Twitter account. Cam Schlittler had a dominant outing, allowing five hits while striking out 12 batters in eight innings. He became the first pitcher in postseason history with 8+ scoreless innings with 12+ strikeouts and no walks, per Sarah Langs. Then, David Bednar closed out the game and the series for the Yankees to advance to the ALDS, where they would face their division rival, the Toronto Blue Jays.

With their series win, the Yankees became the first team under the current playoff format to win their wildcard series after losing the first game in the series.

=== Composite line score ===
2025 ALWC (2–1): New York Yankees beat Boston Red Sox

| Team | 1 | 2 | 3 | 4 | 5 | 6 | 7 | 8 | 9 | R | H | E |
|---|---|---|---|---|---|---|---|---|---|---|---|---|
| Boston Red Sox | 0 | 0 | 2 | 0 | 0 | 1 | 2 | 0 | 1 | 6 | 19 | 2 |
| New York Yankees | 2 | 1 | 0 | 4 | 1 | 0 | 0 | 1 | 0 | 9 | 25 | 2 |
Total attendance: 143,853 Average attendance: 47,951

== See also ==
- 2025 National League Wild Card Series
