= J. C. Escarra =

American baseball player (born 1995)

J.C. Escarra
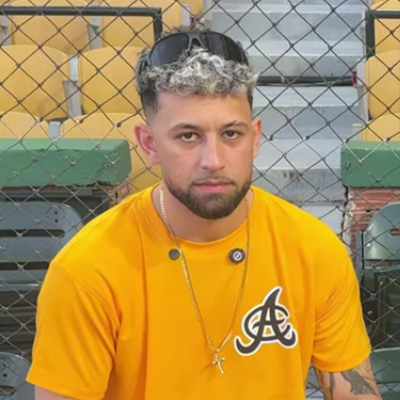
- Escarra with Águilas Cibaeñas in 2025

New York Yankees – No. 25
- Catcher / Infielder
- Born: April 24, 1995 (age 31); Hialeah, Florida, U.S.
- Bats: Left Throws: Right

MLB debut
- March 29, 2025, for the New York Yankees

MLB statistics (through 2026 season)
- Batting average: .195
- Home runs: 2
- Runs batted in: 18
- Stats at Baseball Reference

Teams
- New York Yankees (2025–present)

Juan Carlos Escarra (born April 24, 1995) is an American professional baseball catcher for the New York Yankees of Major League Baseball (MLB). He made his MLB debut in 2025.

== Early life and amateur career ==
Escarra's mother left Cuba for the United States in the Mariel boatlift as a child. His father also left Cuba as a child, settling in New York before meeting his mother as an adult. Escarra was born in Hialeah, Florida. He attended Mater Academy Charter School in Hialeah Gardens.

The New York Mets selected Escarra in the 32nd round of the 2013 Major League Baseball draft, but he chose to attend Florida International University (FIU), where he played college baseball for the FIU Panthers. as a catcher and a first baseman. He played collegiate summer baseball for the Staunton Braves of the Valley Baseball League in 2014 and for the Brewster Whitecaps of the Cape Cod Baseball League in 2015.

== Professional career ==
=== Baltimore Orioles ===
The Baltimore Orioles selected Escarra in the 15th round, with the 458th overall selection, of the 2017 Major League Baseball draft. He made his professional debut with the rookie–level Gulf Coast League Orioles, hitting .224 in 58 games.

Escarra split the 2018 campaign between the Low-A Aberdeen IronBirds and High-A Frederick Keys. In 63 games split between the two affiliates, he batted .315/.395/.479 with seven home runs and 38 runs batted in (RBIs). Escarra returned to Frederick in 2019, playing in 127 games and hitting .235/.325/.364 with 13 home runs and 57 RBIs.

Escarra did not play in a game in 2020 due to the cancellation of the minor league season because of the COVID-19 pandemic. He returned to action in 2021 with the Double-A Bowie Baysox and Triple-A Norfolk Tides. In 95 games for the two affiliates, Escarra batted .223/.332/.358 with eight home runs, 38 RBIs, and six stolen bases. He was released by the Orioles organization on April 6, 2022.

=== Kansas City Monarchs ===
On April 7, 2022, Escarra signed with the Kansas City Monarchs of the American Association, where he mostly played catcher. On the season, he hit .291 with 12 home runs and 35 RBIs in 70 games. Following the season, Escarra played for the Leones de Ponce of the Puerto Rican Winter League.

=== Gastonia Honey Hunters ===
On April 13, 2023, Escarra signed with the Gastonia Honey Hunters of the Atlantic League of Professional Baseball. In 41 appearances for Gastonia, Escarra slashed .348/.423/.707 with 15 home runs and 41 RBIs.

=== Toros de Tijuana ===
On June 20, 2023, Escarra's contract was purchased by the Toros de Tijuana of the Mexican League. In 21 appearances for Tijuana, he slashed .329/.421/.610 with six home runs and 10 RBIs.

=== Algodoneros de Unión Laguna ===
On July 14, 2023, Escarra was traded to the Algodoneros de Unión Laguna. He hit .263 with one home run and 14 RBIs in 21 games for Unión Laguna. Following the season, Escarra played in the Mexican Pacific League for the Algodoneros de Guasave, before once again playing for Ponce later in the offseason. In February 2024, he played for Puerto Rico's representative at the 2024 Caribbean Series, the Criollos de Caguas.

=== New York Yankees ===
On January 11, 2024, the New York Yankees signed Escarra to a minor league contract that included an invitation to spring training. He started the season for the Somerset Patriots of the Double-A Eastern League, as their third catcher behind Ben Rice and Agustín Ramírez. He was promoted to the Scranton/Wilkes-Barre RailRiders of the Triple-A International League in July. In 124 appearances split between the two affiliates, he batted .261/.355/.434 with 12 home runs and 64 RBIs. On November 3, the Yankees added Escarra to their 40-man roster to prevent him from reaching minor league free agency.

After competing for a spot with the Yankees in 2025 spring training, the Yankees added him to their Opening Day roster. He made his MLB debut on March 29, 2025, as a pinch-hitter against the Milwaukee Brewers. Escarra hit his first major league home run against the Toronto Blue Jays on April 27. On July 30, he was optioned to Triple-A to make room on the roster for Amed Rosario. He finished his 2025 season batting 17-for-84 (.202) with two home runs and 11 RBIs in 40 MLB games.

Escarra began the 2026 season with the Yankees. He batted 11-for-62 (.177) in 22 games before the team optioned him to Scranton/Wilkes-Barre on June 6. However, he was later recalled the same day after Austin Wells was placed on the injured list.

== Personal life ==
Escarra and his wife, Jocelyn, married in October 2022. They had a son in 2025.
