= Will Warren =

American baseball player (born 1999)

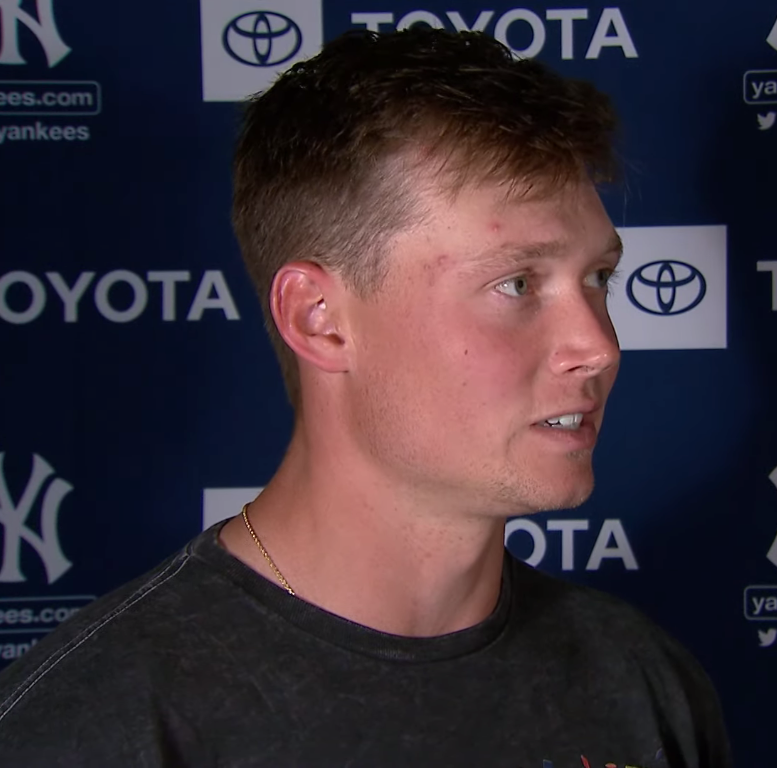
- Warren with the New York Yankees in 2024

New York Yankees – No. 29
- Pitcher
- Born: June 16, 1999 (age 27); Brandon, Mississippi, U.S.
- Bats: Right Throws: Right

MLB debut
- July 30, 2024, for the New York Yankees

MLB statistics (through 2026 season)
- Win–loss record: 20–17
- Earned run average: 4.59
- Strikeouts: 358
- Stats at Baseball Reference

Teams
- New York Yankees (2024–present)

William Harper Warren (born June 16, 1999) is an American professional baseball pitcher for the New York Yankees of Major League Baseball (MLB). He played college baseball for Southeastern Louisiana University, and the Yankees selected Warren in the eighth round of the 2021 MLB draft. He made his MLB debut in 2024.

== Amateur career ==
Warren is from Brandon, Mississippi. He attended Jackson Preparatory School in Flowood, Mississippi, graduating in 2017, and Southeastern Louisiana University, where he played college baseball for the Southeastern Louisiana Lions. In 2018, Warren played collegiate summer baseball for the St. Cloud Rox of the Northwoods League.

== Professional career ==
The New York Yankees selected Warren in the eighth round, with the 243rd overall selection, of the 2021 Major League Baseball draft. He made his professional debut in 2022 with the Hudson Valley Renegades of the High-A South Atlantic League. He had a 3.60 earned run average (ERA) and 42 strikeouts in 35 innings pitched before the Yankees promoted him to the Somerset Patriots of the Double-A Eastern League in May. He returned to Somerset for the start of the 2023 season. The Yankees promoted him to the Scranton/Wilkes-Barre RailRiders of the Triple-A International League in May.

The Yankees invited Warren to spring training in 2024 as a non-roster player. He started the 2024 season with Scranton/Wilkes-Barre and struggled to a 7.62 ERA through late May. The Yankees promoted Warren to the major leagues and he made his debut on July 30. In 2024, Warren had a 10.32 ERA in 22 2/3 innings for the Yankees and a 5.91 ERA in 109 2/3 innings for the RailRiders.

Due to injuries to Gerrit Cole and Luis Gil, Warren made the Yankees' Opening Day roster in 2025 as a member of the starting rotation. He got his first career win as a pitcher against the San Francisco Giants on April 12, 2025, at Yankee Stadium. Warren pitched five innings, allowed two hits and two runs, while walked two batters and struck out six batters as the Yankees defeated the Giants 8–4. He finished the 2025 season with a 4.44 ERA in 33 games started.
