= Mark Leiter Jr. =

American baseball player (born 1991)

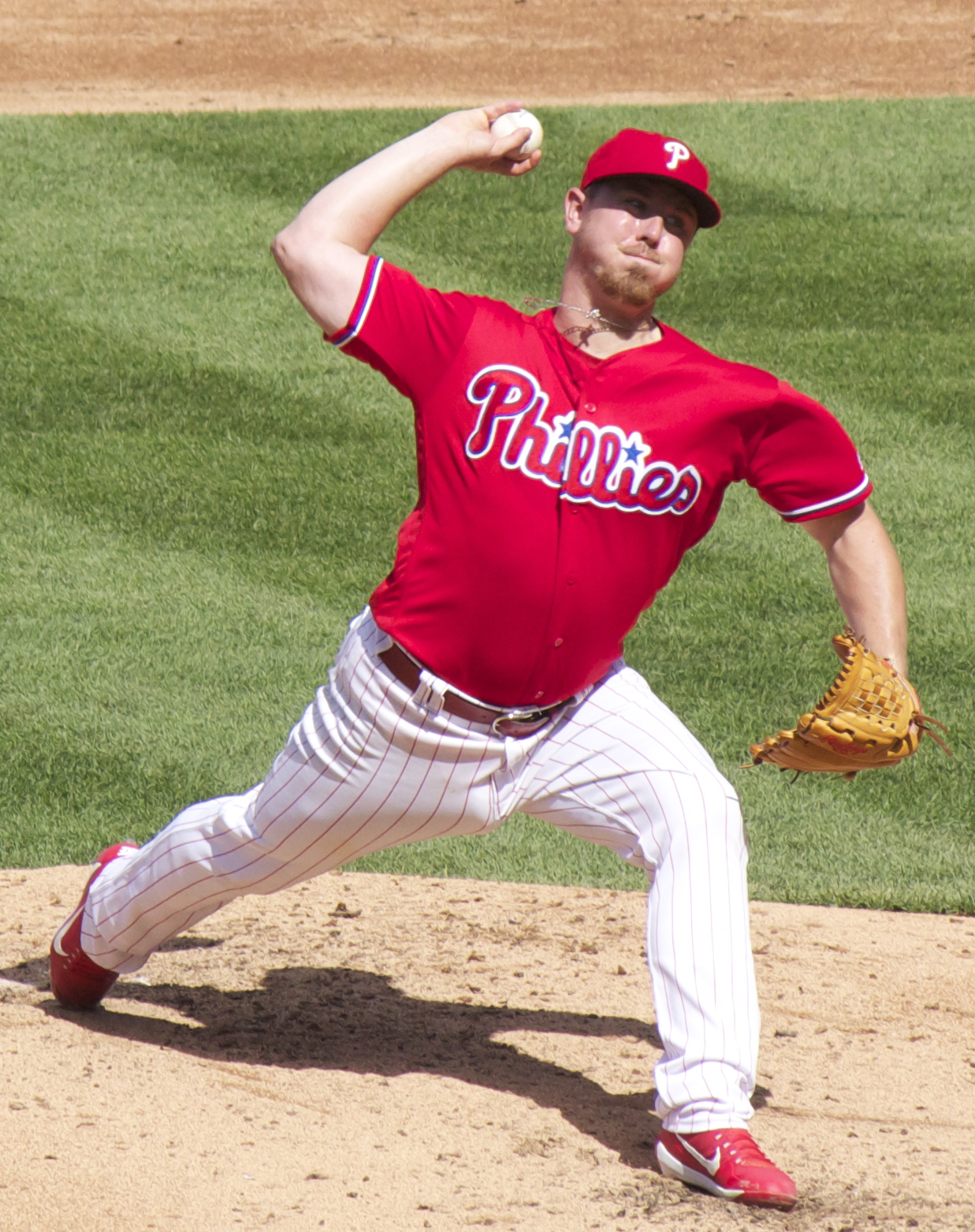
- Leiter Jr. with the Philadelphia Phillies in 2017

Free agent
- Pitcher
- Born: March 13, 1991 (age 35); Fort Lauderdale, Florida, U.S.
- Bats: Right Throws: Right

MLB debut
- April 28, 2017, for the Philadelphia Phillies

MLB statistics (through 2026 season)
- Win–loss record: 16–30
- Earned run average: 4.57
- Strikeouts: 434
- Stats at Baseball Reference

Teams
- Philadelphia Phillies (2017–2018); Toronto Blue Jays (2018); Chicago Cubs (2022–2024); New York Yankees (2024–2025); Athletics (2026)

Mark Edward Leiter Jr. (born March 13, 1991) is an American professional baseball pitcher who is a free agent. He has played in Major League Baseball (MLB) for the Philadelphia Phillies, Toronto Blue Jays, Chicago Cubs, New York Yankees, and Athletics. Leiter played college baseball at the New Jersey Institute of Technology. He was selected by the Phillies in the 22nd round of the 2013 MLB draft, and made his MLB debut with them in 2017.

== Career ==
Leiter attended Toms River High School North in Toms River, New Jersey and played college baseball at the New Jersey Institute of Technology.

=== Philadelphia Phillies ===
He was drafted by the Philadelphia Phillies in the 22nd round of the 2013 Major League Baseball draft and signed. He made his professional debut that year with the GCL Phillies and he was promoted to the Clearwater Threshers and Lakewood BlueClaws during the season. In 45 innings pitched between the three teams, he was 4–0 with a 1.20 ERA. In 2014, he played for Lakewood and Clearwater, compiling a combined 9–12 record and 4.35 ERA in 27 total starts, and in 2015, he pitched with Clearwater and the Reading Fighting Phils, going 8–7 with a 3.09 ERA in 27 games (21 starts). Leiter spent 2016 with Reading where he pitched to a 6–3 record and 3.39 ERA in 23 games (17 starts). He began 2017 with the Lehigh Valley IronPigs.

Leiter was called up to the Major Leagues for the first time on April 18, 2017, making his debut on April 28. He finished his rookie season with a 3–6 record and a 4.96 ERA with 84 strikeouts over 27 appearances (11 starts). He began 2018 on the disabled list and was optioned to Lehigh Valley after he was activated.

=== Toronto Blue Jays ===
On September 1, 2018, Leiter was claimed off waivers by the Toronto Blue Jays. He was activated from the disabled list on September 3 and made 8 appearances for Toronto, struggling to a 13.50 ERA with 9 strikeouts across 6 2/3 innings. Leiter was designated for assignment by the Blue Jays on November 26. He later cleared waivers and was assigned to the Triple–A Buffalo Bisons.

On March 17, 2019, the Blue Jays organization announced Leiter would miss the entire season after undergoing Tommy John surgery. Leiter elected free agency following the season on November 4.

=== Arizona Diamondbacks ===
On February 13, 2020, Leiter signed a minor league contract with the Arizona Diamondbacks. He did not play in a game in 2020 due to the cancellation of the minor league season because of the COVID-19 pandemic. Leiter was released by the Diamondbacks organization on May 22.

=== Somerset Patriots ===
On July 9, 2020, Leiter signed with the Somerset Patriots of the Atlantic League of Professional Baseball. He did not play in a game for the Patriots due to the cancellation of the 2020 ALPB season as a result of the COVID-19 pandemic, though he would participate in a pop-up series of games that the team would create called the SOMERSET Professional Baseball Series.

=== Detroit Tigers ===
On March 24, 2021, Leiter signed a minor league contract with the Detroit Tigers organization. Leiter split the 2021 season with the Double-A Erie SeaWolves and the Triple-A Toledo Mud Hens. He made 25 appearances, going 10–8 with a 3.77 ERA and 145 strikeouts. He became a free agent following the season.

=== Chicago Cubs ===
On December 17, 2021, Leiter signed a minor league contract with the Chicago Cubs. On April 16, 2022, Leiter's contract was selected by the Cubs. On August 16, Leiter recorded his first career save in a game against the Washington Nationals. In 35 appearances for Chicago, Leiter registered a 2–7 record and 3.99 ERA with 73 strikeouts in 67 2/3 innings pitched.

On January 13, 2023, Leiter was designated for assignment by Chicago after the signing of Eric Hosmer was made official. On January 19, Leiter cleared waivers and was sent outright to the Triple–A Iowa Cubs. However, four days later, Leiter rejected the outright assignment and elected free agency. On February 2, Leiter re-signed with the Cubs on a minor league contract. On March 30, the Cubs selected Leiter's contract, adding him to the major league roster. In 69 relief appearances, he logged a 3.50 ERA with 77 strikeouts and four saves across 64 1/3 innings pitched.

Leiter made 39 appearances out of the bullpen for the Cubs in 2024, compiling a 2–4 record and 4.21 ERA with 53 strikeouts over 36 1/3 innings pitched.

=== New York Yankees ===
On July 30, 2024, the Cubs traded Leiter Jr. to the New York Yankees in exchange for infielder Ben Cowles and pitcher Jack Neely. He made 21 appearances down the stretch for the team, posting a 2-1 record and 4.98 ERA with 33 strikeouts across 21 2/3 innings pitched.

Leiter made 59 appearances out of the bullpen for the Yankees during the 2025 season, compiling a 6-7 record and 4.84 ERA with 54 strikeouts and two saves across 48 1/3 innings pitched. On November 21, 2025, he was non-tendered by New York and became a free agent.

=== Athletics ===
On December 17, 2025, Leiter signed a one-year, $2.85 million contract with the Athletics. He made 36 appearances for the team, compiling an 0–1 record and 4.28 ERA with 38 strikeouts and four saves across 33 2/3 innings pitched. On July 21, 2026, Leiter was placed on the injured list due to a right hip impingement. On July 28, it was announced that Leiter had undergone season–ending surgery to address the injury.

== Personal life ==
His father, Mark Leiter, and uncle, Al Leiter, pitched in the major leagues. His cousin, Jack Leiter, is currently a pitcher for the Texas Rangers.

Leiter has been a resident of the Lanoka Harbor section of Lacey Township, New Jersey.

== See also ==
- List of second-generation Major League Baseball players
