= Jayvien Sandridge =

American baseball player (born 1999)

Baltimore Orioles
- Pitcher
- Born: February 11, 1999 (age 27); Hagerstown, Maryland, U.S.
- Bats: Left Throws: Left

MLB debut
- July 5, 2025, for the New York Yankees

MLB statistics (through 2025 season)
- Win–loss record: 0–0
- Earned run average: 27.00
- Strikeouts: 2
- Stats at Baseball Reference

Teams
- New York Yankees (2025)

Jayvien Sandridge (born February 11, 1999) is an American professional baseball pitcher in the Baltimore Orioles organization. He has previously played in Major League Baseball (MLB) for the New York Yankees, with whom he made his MLB debut in 2025.

== Career ==
Sandridge attended Grace Academy in Hagerstown, Maryland, and Mercersburg Academy in Mercersburg, Pennsylvania.

=== Baltimore Orioles ===
The Baltimore Orioles selected Sandridge in the 32nd round, with the 955th overall selection, of the 2018 Major League Baseball draft. He signed with the Orioles rather than enroll at the University of Central Florida. Sandridge made his professional debut with the rookie-level Gulf Coast League Orioles, logging a 3-0 record and 2.00 ERA with 18 strikeouts in 15 games. Returning to the GCL Orioles for the 2019 season, Sandridge pitched to a 1-0 record and 5.54 ERA with 19 strikeouts in 13 innings pitched across 11 relief outings.

Sandridge did not play in a game in 2020 due to the cancellation of the Minor League Baseball season because of the COVID-19 pandemic. He was released by the Orioles organization on May 20, 2020.

=== Cincinnati Reds ===
Sandridge played college baseball at Lynn University after his release and signed with the Cincinnati Reds on June 9, 2021. He made seven appearances down the stretch for the rookie-level Arizona Complex League Reds, posting an 0-3 record and 7.00 ERA with 12 strikeouts in nine innings. Sandridge split the 2022 season between the Single-A Daytona Tortugas and High-A Dayton Dragons, registering a combined 1-2 record and 3.10 ERA with 67 strikeouts and three saves in 40 2/3 innings over 28 total appearances.

Sandridge split the 2023 season between Dayton and the Double-A Chattanooga Lookouts, accumulating a 4-4 record and 3.71 ERA with 91 strikeouts and one save across 39 appearances (one start). He elected free agency following the season on November 6, 2023.

=== San Diego Padres ===
On November 20, 2023, Sandridge signed a minor league contract with the San Diego Padres organization. He made 52 appearances out of the bullpen for the Double-A San Antonio Missions and Triple-A El Paso Chihuahuas, posting a cumulative 4-4 record and 4.28 ERA with 95 strikeouts and four saves over 61 innings of work. Sandridge elected free agency following the season on November 4, 2024.

=== New York Yankees ===
On February 9, 2025, Sandridge signed a minor league contract with the New York Yankees. In 10 appearances split between the Single-A Tampa Tarpons, High-A Hudson Valley Renegades, and Triple-A Scranton/Wilkes-Barre RailRiders, he posted a combined 1-1 record and 3.00 ERA with 20 strikeouts and two saves over 12 innings of work. On June 19, Sandridge was selected to the 40-man roster and promoted to the major leagues for the first time. He was optioned to Triple-A the following day without making an appearance, but was promoted again on June 22 and was optioned without making an appearance the next day. On July 4, Sandridge was promoted to the major leagues for a third time. He made his MLB debut the following day against the New York Mets, allowing two runs over 2/3 innings.

On January 27, 2026, Sandridge was designated for assignment by the Yankees.

=== Baltimore Orioles (second stint) ===
On January 29, 2026, the Yankees traded Sandridge to the Los Angeles Angels in exchange for cash considerations. He was optioned to the Triple-A Salt Lake Bees to begin the regular season. However, on March 24, Sandridge was designated for assignment by Los Angeles. On March 29, Sandridge was traded to the Baltimore Orioles in exchange for cash. He made two scoreless appearances for Norfolk prior to being designated for assignment on April 15. Sandridge cleared waivers and returned to Norfolk via outright assignment on April 19. He made six total appearances for the Tides, struggling to a 10.13 ERA with seven strikeouts across 5 1/3 innings pitched.

On October 20, 2026, Sandridge re–signed with Baltimore on a minor league contract.
