= Ryan McMahon =

American baseball player (born 1994)

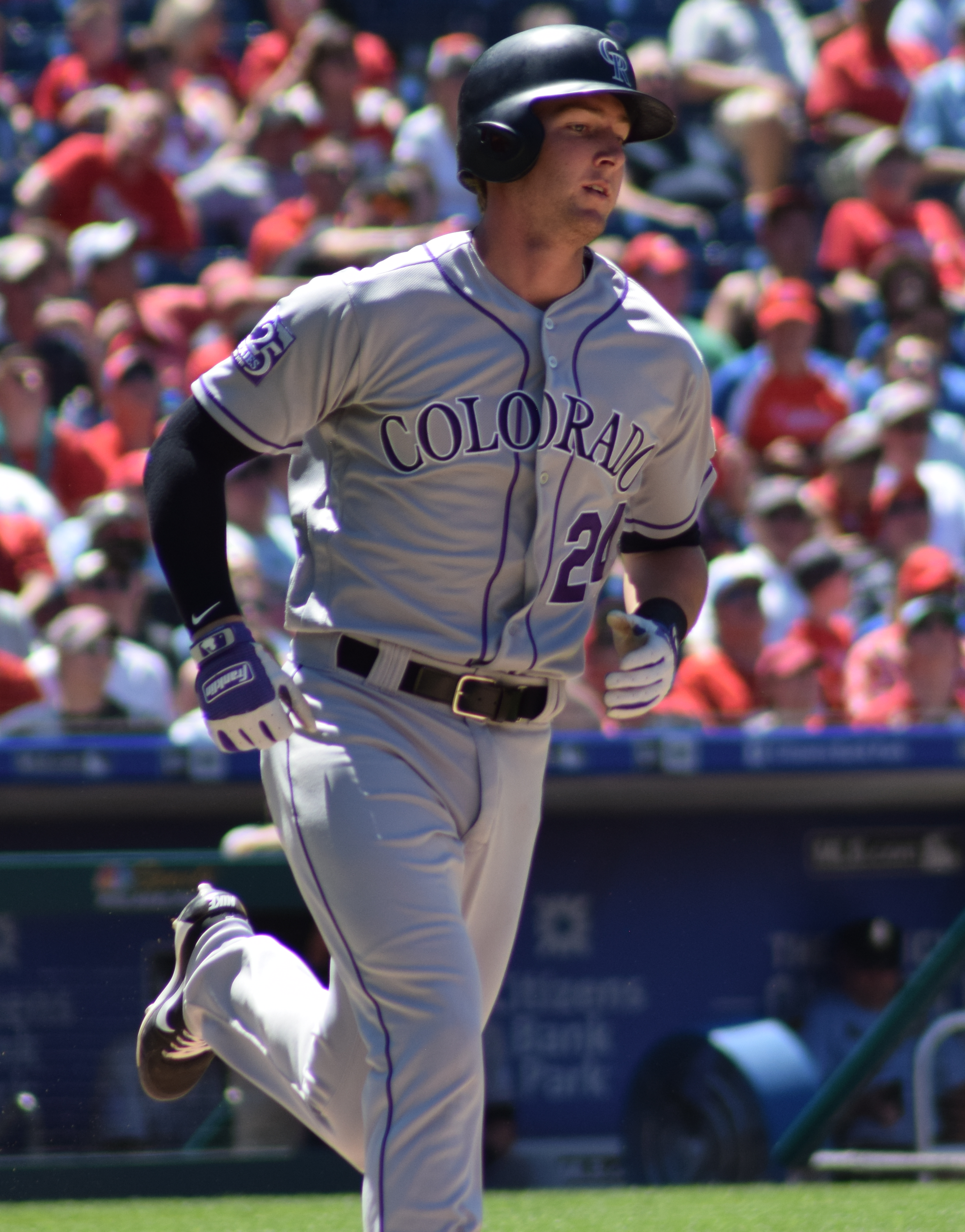
- McMahon with the Colorado Rockies in 2018

New York Yankees – No. 19
- Third baseman
- Born: December 14, 1994 (age 31); Yorba Linda, California, U.S.
- Bats: Left Throws: Right

MLB debut
- August 12, 2017, for the Colorado Rockies

MLB statistics (through 2026 season)
- Batting average: .237
- Home runs: 155
- Runs batted in: 511
- Stats at Baseball Reference

Teams
- Colorado Rockies (2017–2025); New York Yankees (2025–present)

Career highlights and awards
- All-Star (2024)

Ryan Patrick McMahon (born December 14, 1994) is an American professional baseball third baseman for the New York Yankees of Major League Baseball (MLB). He has previously played in MLB for the Colorado Rockies. He made his MLB debut in 2017 and was an All-Star in 2024.

== Amateur career ==
McMahon attended Mater Dei High School in Santa Ana, California where he played baseball and was a quarterback on his football team. The Rockies selected him in the second round, with the 42nd overall selection, of the 2013 Major League Baseball draft.

== Professional career ==
=== Colorado Rockies ===
McMahon signed with the Rockies, forgoing his commitment to play college baseball at the University of Southern California, and made his professional debut with the Grand Junction Rockies. He spent all of 2013 there, batting .321/.402/.583 with 11 home runs and 52 RBIs in 59 games. In 2014, he played for the Asheville Tourists where he posted a .282 batting average with 18 home runs, 102 RBIs, and 46 doubles in 126 games, and in 2015, he played with the Modesto Nuts where he slashed .300/.372/.520 with 18 home runs, 75 RBIs, and 43 doubles in 132 games. McMahon spent 2016 with the Hartford Yard Goats where he batted .242 with 12 home runs and 75 RBIs in 133 games.

McMahon began 2017 back with Hartford. Aside from third base, he also started to play second and first in order to improve his versatility. He was promoted to the Albuquerque Isotopes in June. He played in the All-Star Futures Game in July.

The Rockies promoted McMahon to the major leagues on August 11, 2017, primarily to play first base. He was sent back down on August 18 and recalled again in September. In 119 games between Hartford and Albuquerque he batted. 355/.403/.583 with 20 home runs and 88 RBIs, and in 17 games for Colorado, he batted .158.

The Rockies went into the 2018 season with McMahon as the primary first baseman, but after 28 games he was sent down to the Isotopes after beginning the season with just three RBIs and hitting .180 in 50 at-bats. On June 14, 2018, McMahon hit his first major league home run. On August 11, with the Rockies trailing 0–2 to the Los Angeles Dodgers in the bottom of the 9th inning, McMahon hit a two-out three-run walk-off home run off Dodgers closer J. T. Chargois to give his team a 3–2 victory. It was McMahon's first career walk-off homer and came only a day after he had hit another go-ahead home run against the Dodgers that proved to be the game winner.

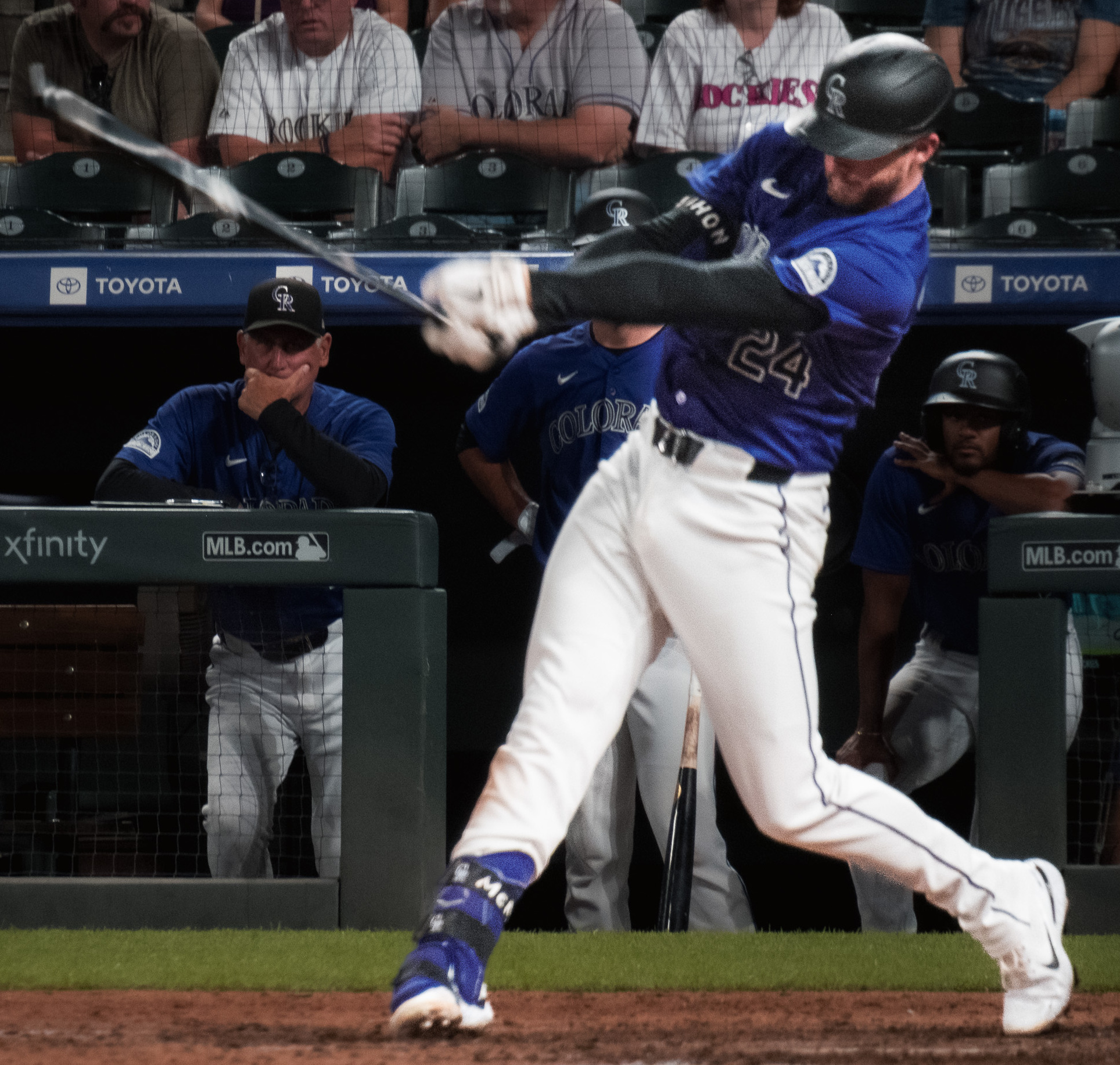
McMahon with the Rockies in 2024

In 2019, McMahon served as the Rockies' primary second baseman, playing other games at first and third base. He batted .250/.329/.450, and had the highest strikeout percentage in the National League (29.7%). In the shortened 2020 season, McMahon hit .215/.295/.419 with 9 home runs and 26 RBIs in 52 games.

On April 6, 2021, McMahon hit three home runs, with two solo shots off of starter Luke Weaver and one off of Alex Young. He finished the 2021 season slashing .254/.331/.449 with 23 home runs and a career-high 86 RBIs and 80 runs scored.

On March 21, 2022, McMahon signed a six-year, $70 million contract extension with the Rockies. The extension allows for an opt-out after the fourth year if he finishes top five in National League MVP voting in any of the first three years. In 2022, McMahon played in 153 games, batting .246/.327/.414 with 20 home runs and 67 RBI. He played in 133 games in 2023, batting .240/.322/.431 with 23 home runs and 70 RBI.

In 2024, McMahon was named to the All-Star Game for the first time in his career. Across 153 games in 2024, he batted .242/.325/.397 with 20 home runs and 65 RBI.

McMahon played in 100 games for the Rockies in 2025, batting .217/.314/.403 with 16 home runs and 35 RBI.

=== New York Yankees ===
On July 25, 2025, the Rockies traded McMahon to the New York Yankees in exchange for Josh Grosz and Griffin Herring.
