= Connelly Early =

American baseball player (born 2002)

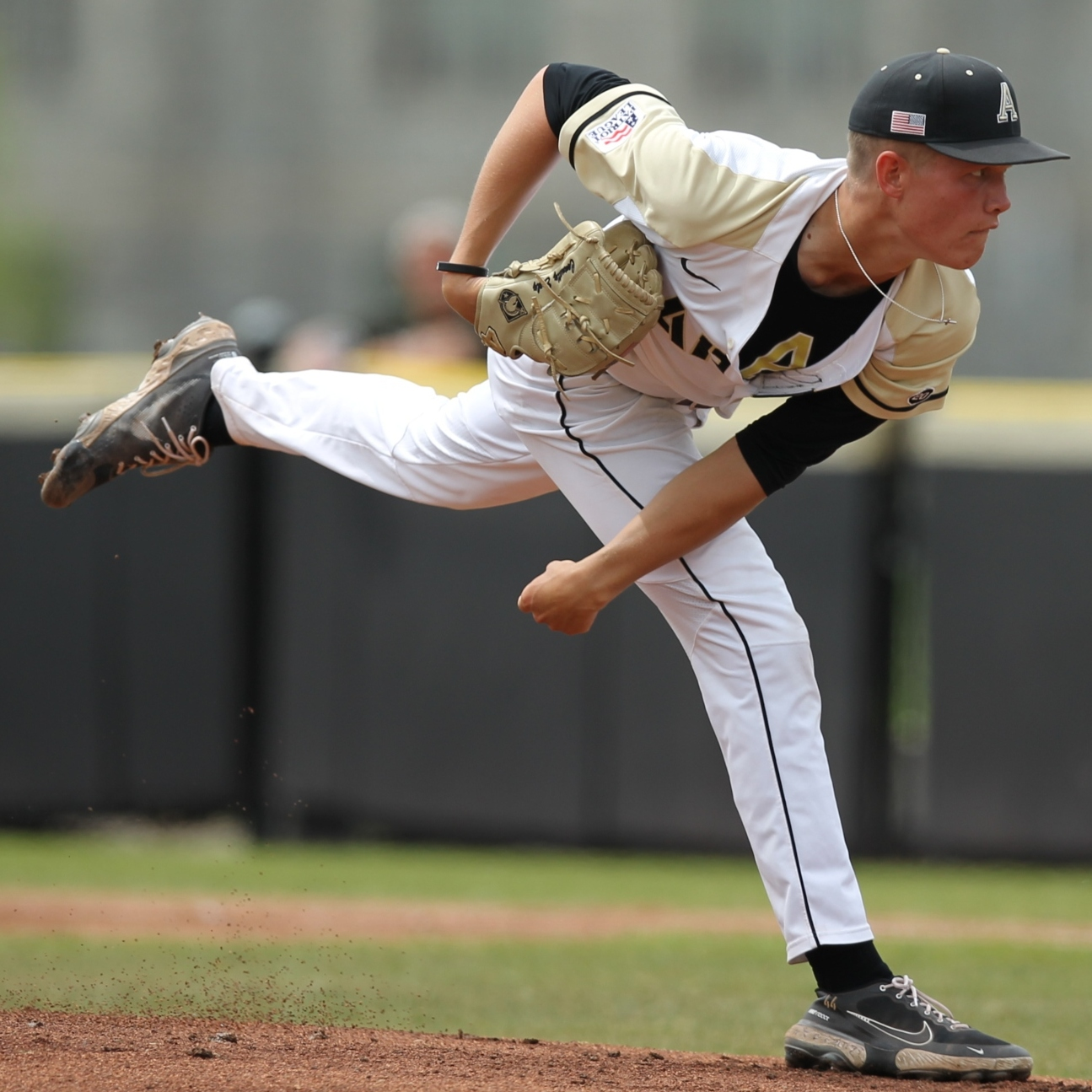
- Early with Army in 2022

Washington Nationals – No. 19
- Pitcher
- Born: April 3, 2002 (age 24); Midlothian, Virginia, U.S.
- Bats: Left Throws: Left

MLB debut
- September 9, 2025, for the Boston Red Sox

MLB statistics (through 2026 season)
- Win–loss record: 8–7
- Earned run average: 3.16
- Strikeouts: 123
- Stats at Baseball Reference

Teams
- Boston Red Sox (2025–2026); Washington Nationals (2026–present)

Todd Connelly McNeil Early (born April 3, 2002) is an American professional baseball pitcher for the Washington Nationals of Major League Baseball (MLB). He has previously played in MLB for the Boston Red Sox. He made his MLB debut in 2025.

== Amateur career ==
Early attended James River High School in Midlothian, Virginia, and played college baseball at the United States Military Academy at West Point as well as the University of Virginia.

== Professional career ==
=== Boston Red Sox ===
Early was drafted by the Boston Red Sox in the fifth round, with the 151st overall selection, of the 2023 Major League Baseball draft. He signed with the team and made his professional debut with the Single-A Salem Red Sox. He split the 2024 with campaign between the High-A Greenville Drive and Double-A Portland Sea Dogs.

Early began the 2025 season with Portland, and received a promotion to the Triple-A Worcester Red Sox. In 21 appearances (18 starts) split between the two affiliates, he accumulated a 10–3 record and 2.60 ERA with 132 strikeouts across 100 1/3 innings pitched.

On September 9, 2025, Early was selected to the 40-man roster and promoted to the major leagues for the first time; he made his MLB debut that day. Starting against the Athletics, he struck out 11 batters in five innings pitched. Early's performance tied a record for strikeouts in a Red Sox rookie debut, set by Don Aase in 1977. On October 2, Early started the deciding Game 3 of the American League Wild Card series against the New York Yankees. He allowed three earned runs over 3 2/3 innings with six strikeouts and one walk, as the Yankees won the game 4–0.

Early made the Red Sox Opening Day roster in 2026 as the third member of Boston's starting rotation.

=== Washington Nationals ===
On July 25, 2026, the Red Sox traded Early to the Washington Nationals in exchange for Curtis Mead. He was transferred to the 60–day injured list on August 22, as a result of elbow inflammation. He made his first outing with the Nationals on September 26, pitching three scoreless innings.
