= Fernando Cruz (baseball) =

Puerto Rican baseball player (born 1990)

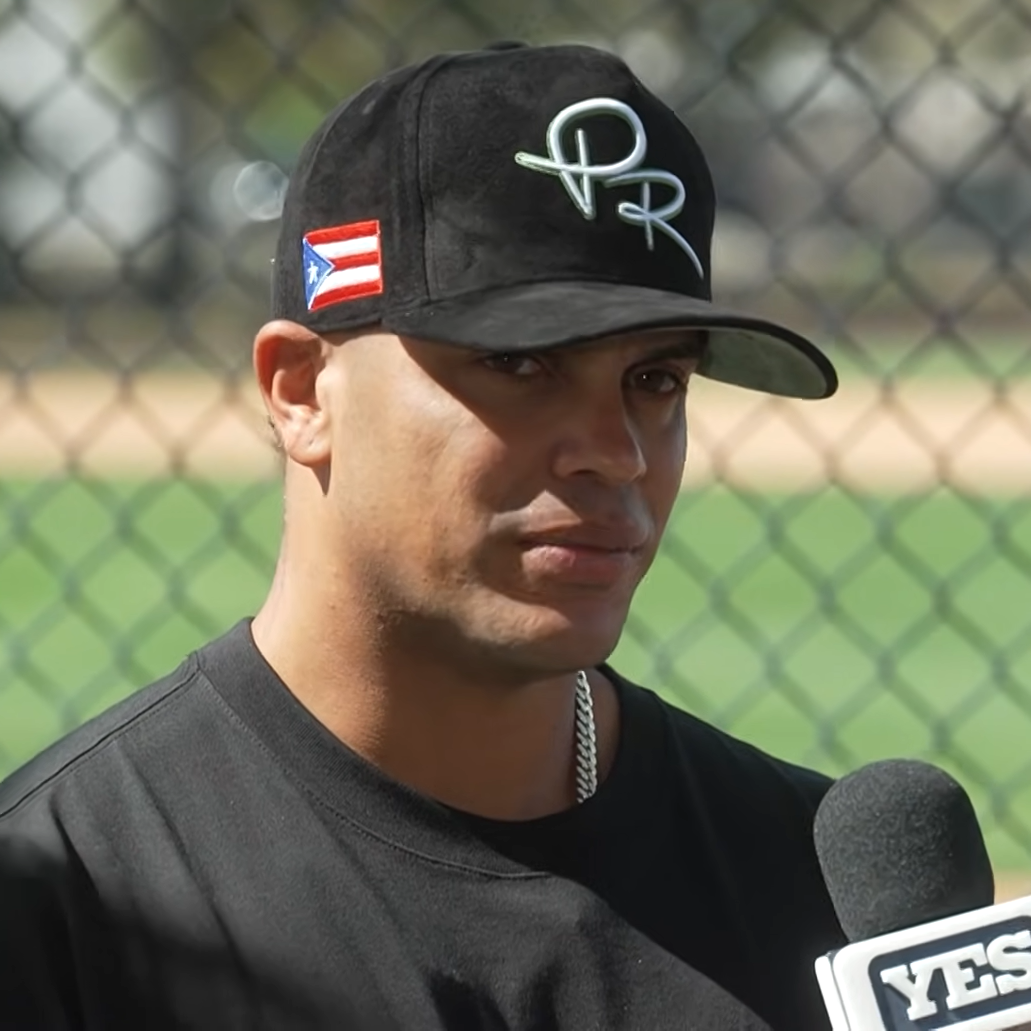
- Cruz in 2026

Free agent
- Pitcher
- Born: March 28, 1990 (age 36); Bayamón, Puerto Rico
- Bats: Switch Throws: Right

MLB debut
- September 2, 2022, for the Cincinnati Reds

MLB statistics (through 2026 season)
- Win–loss record: 11–21
- Earned run average: 4.03
- Strikeouts: 367
- Stats at Baseball Reference

Teams
- Cincinnati Reds (2022–2024); New York Yankees (2025–2026)
Medals
Men's baseball
Representing Puerto Rico
Central American and Caribbean Games
Gold medal – first place	2018 Barranquilla	Team

Fernando E. Cruz (born March 28, 1990) is a Puerto Rican professional baseball pitcher who is currently a free agent. The Kansas City Royals selected Cruz in the sixth round of the 2007 MLB draft as an infielder. He has previously played in MLB for the Cincinnati Reds, with whom he made his MLB debut in 2022. For the 2025 and 2026 seasons, Cruz pitched for the New York Yankees.

== Career ==
=== Kansas City Royals ===
The Kansas City Royals selected Cruz in the sixth round, 186th overall, of the 2007 Major League Baseball draft as an infielder. Cruz made his professional debut with the rookie-level Arizona League Royals. He spent the next two seasons with the rookie-level Burlington Royals, playing in a total of 157 games in the two years, hitting .277 and .221 with a cumulative 3 home runs and 44 RBI.

Cruz converted into a pitcher in 2011, but struggled in 17 appearances for the AZL Royals, for whom he posted a 2–3 record and 7.99 ERA with 15 walks and 17 strikeouts in 23 2/3 innings pitched. He spent the 2012 season with the rookie-level Idaho Falls Chukars, logging a 4–3 record and 6.88 ERA with 17 walks, 38 strikeouts and 3 saves in 35 1/3 innings of work. On October 3, 2012, Cruz was released by the Royals organization.

=== Chicago Cubs ===
After spending the 2013 and 2014 seasons out of affiliate ball, Cruz signed a minor league contract with the Chicago Cubs organization on December 19, 2014. He spent the 2015 season split between three affiliates: the Single-A Myrtle Beach Pelicans, the Double-A Tennessee Smokies, and the Triple-A Iowa Cubs. In 32 combined games, he pitched to a 3–4 record and 5.64 ERA with 34 walks, 58 strikeouts and 3 saves in 68 2/3 innings pitched. He was released by the Cubs during Spring Training the following year on March 29, 2016.

=== New Jersey Jackals ===
On April 17, 2016, Cruz signed with the New Jersey Jackals of the Can-Am League. He made 34 appearances for the team that season, registering a 6–3 record and 2.63 ERA with 79 strikeouts and 12 saves in 72 innings pitched.

In 2017, Cruz made 7 starts for the club, posting a 4–2 record and 2.82 ERA with 55 strikeouts in 51 innings of work. He made only 1 start with the team in 2018, earning the win after tossing 8 1/3 innings and allowing 3 runs on 7 hits, 2 walks, and 8 strikeouts.

=== Pericos de Puebla ===
On August 10, 2018, Cruz signed with the Pericos de Puebla of the Mexican League. In 9 appearances (2 starts) to close out the year, Cruz worked to a 1–1 record and 7.80 ERA with eight walks and 10 strikeouts in 15.0 innings of work. He became a free agent after the season.

=== Mariachis de Guadalajara ===
After taking the 2019 and 2020 seasons off, Cruz signed with the Mariachis de Guadalajara of the Mexican League on May 20, 2021. He pitched in 26 games for Guadalajara, logging a 4–1 record and 2.73 ERA with 37 strikeouts and 14 saves in 26 1/3 innings pitched.

=== Cincinnati Reds ===
On February 1, 2022, Cruz signed a minor league contract with the Cincinnati Reds organization. He was assigned to the Triple-A Louisville Bats to begin the year. With Louisville, he was 4–4 with a 2.89 ERA in 56 innings, and second in the minor leagues with 23 saves.

On September 1, 2022, Cruz was selected to the 40-man roster and promoted to the major leagues for the first time. He made his MLB debut the following day, at age 32. He finished his rookie campaign making 14 appearances for Cincinnati, pitching to a 1.23 ERA with 21 strikeouts in 14 2/3 innings. With Louisville, in two appearances he gave up three earned runs in 1 2/3 innings.

Cruz pitched in 58 games for the Reds during the 2023 season, posting a 1-2 record and 4.91 ERA with 98 strikeouts over 66 innings of work. Cruz made 69 appearances for Cincinnati in 2024, compiling a 3-8 record and 4.86 ERA with 109 strikeouts across 66 2/3 innings pitched.

=== New York Yankees ===
On December 20, 2024, the Reds traded Cruz and Alex Jackson to the New York Yankees in exchange for Jose Trevino. Cruz made 49 appearances out of the bullpen for the Yankees in 2025, compiling a 3–4 record and 3.56 ERA with 72 strikeouts and two saves over 48 innings of work.

Cruz made 61 relief appearances for New York during the 2026 campaign, logging a 4—6 record and 3.13 ERA with 67 strikeouts and two saves across 54 2/3 innings pitched. On August 26, 2026, Cruz was diagnosed with a partially torn ulnar collateral ligament in his pitching elbow. On November 20, 2026, he was non-tendered by the Yankees and became a free agent.

== International career ==
Cruz played for Puerto Rico in the World Baseball Classic in 2023 and in 2026.
