= Ben Rice =

American baseball player (born 1999)

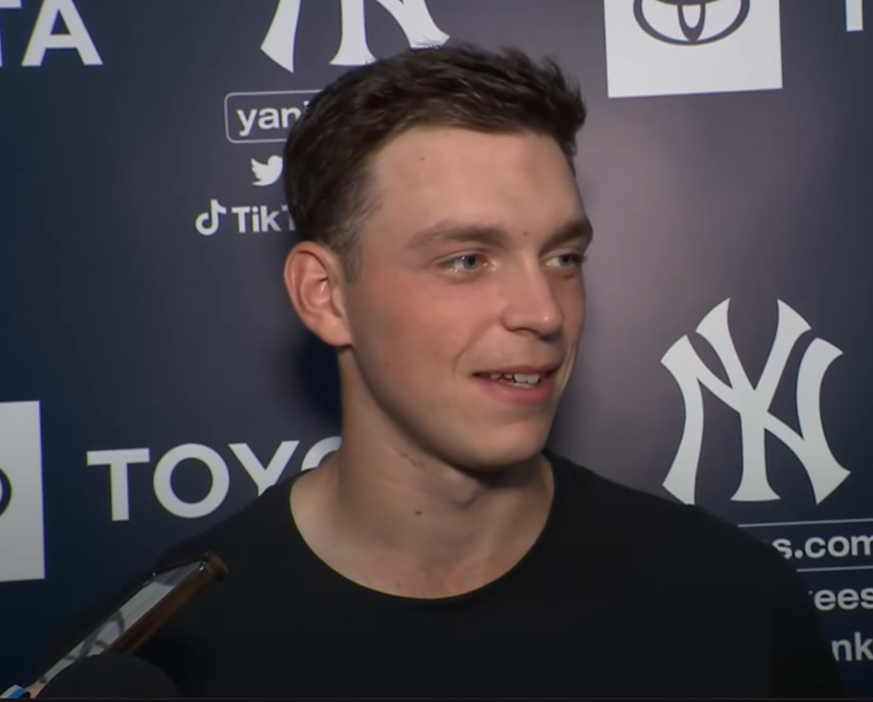
- Rice in 2024

New York Yankees – No. 22
- First baseman / Designated hitter
- Born: February 22, 1999 (age 27); Cohasset, Massachusetts, U.S.
- Bats: Left Throws: Right

MLB debut
- June 18, 2024, for the New York Yankees

MLB statistics (through 2026 season)
- Batting average: .248
- Home runs: 74
- Runs batted in: 185
- Stats at Baseball Reference

Teams
- New York Yankees (2024–present)

Career highlights and awards
- All-Star (2026)

Benjamin Kimball Rice (born February 22, 1999) is an American professional baseball first baseman and designated hitter for the New York Yankees of Major League Baseball (MLB). Rice played college baseball for Dartmouth College and was selected by the Yankees in the 12th round of the 2021 MLB draft. He made his MLB debut in 2024. Rice was named to his first All-Star game in 2026.

== Early life ==
Rice grew up in Cohasset, Massachusetts. He began playing hockey at a young age before pursuing baseball. He grew up a fan of the New York Yankees of Major League Baseball (MLB), despite many of his friends supporting the rival Boston Red Sox. Since a young age, Rice's favorite player is former Yankee Derek Jeter.

== Career ==
=== Amateur career ===
Rice attended Noble and Greenough School in Dedham, Massachusetts. In his freshman year, he played for the varsity hockey team and junior varsity baseball team as a second baseman and catcher. After graduating, Rice enrolled at Dartmouth College, where he played college baseball for the Dartmouth Big Green. In 2019, his freshman year, he received 72 at bats. Rice appeared in seven games during his sophomore year in 2020 before the COVID-19 pandemic resulted in the cancellation of the remainder of the season. Rice helped organize scrimmages among Ivy League baseball players in 2020 to offset this. He also played collegiate summer baseball in the Futures Collegiate Baseball League for the Worcester Bravehearts, where he had a .350 batting average and 11 home runs in 123 at bats, winning the league's most valuable player award.

With the Ivy League still shut down in 2021, Rice played for the Braintree White Sox of the Cranberry Baseball League, an amateur league. He played collegiate summer baseball with the Cotuit Kettleers of the Cape Cod Baseball League. He graduated with a Bachelor of Arts in psychology from Dartmouth in 2022.

=== Minor leagues ===
The Yankees selected Rice in the 12th round, with the 363rd overall selection, of the 2021 MLB draft. He signed with the Yankees for a $125,000 signing bonus. Rice spent his first professional season with the rookie-level Florida Complex League Yankees and Single-A Tampa Tarpons, hitting .197 in 23 combined games.

Rice spent the 2022 campaign back with Tampa, playing in 68 games and hitting .267/.368/.442 with nine home runs and 36 runs batted in (RBIs). He started the 2023 with Tampa before being promoted to the High-A Hudson Valley Renegades and Double-A Somerset Patriots during the season. In 73 games split between the three affiliates, Rice accumulated a .324/.434/.615 slash line with 20 home runs, 68 RBIs, and 11 stolen bases.

Rice began the 2024 season with Somerset. He was promoted to the Triple-A Scranton/Wilkes-Barre RailRiders on June 5, for whom he batted .294/.428/.661 in 109 at bats.

=== Major leagues ===
On June 18, 2024, the Yankees promoted Rice to the major leagues. He made his debut that day against the Baltimore Orioles. He recorded his first major league hit in the third inning with a single to right field. On July 6, in a game against the Boston Red Sox, Rice became the first rookie in Yankees history to hit three home runs in one game; his seven RBIs also matched Lou Gehrig's record for a Yankee rookie. After an initial hot streak, Rice fell into an extended slump and was demoted to Triple-A Scranton/Wilkes-Barre in late August. Rice finished his MLB season with a .171 batting average, .613 OPS, 7 home runs, and 23 RBIs in 50 games.

Rice standing in the batter's box, wearing #22.

In the 2024–25 offseason, Rice added approximately 10 pounds (4.5 kg) of muscle in an effort to improve his offensive production. Following a strong performance in spring training, Rice made the Yankees' Opening Day roster for the 2025 season, and went on to produce elite offensive metrics while seeing time as designated hitter, first-baseman, and catcher. On May 11, he hit his first career grand slam against the Athletics. He finished the regular season with a .255 batting average, .836 OPS, 26 home runs, and 65 RBIs in 530 plate appearances. He hit a home run in his first postseason at-bat during the 2025 American League Wild Card Series against Boston.

Rice was named the American League Player of the Week for the week of May 25–31, 2026; he batted 12-for-26 (.462) during the week. Rice was selected for the 2026 MLB All-Star Game and participated in the 2026 Home Run Derby. He finished the season with 41 home runs.

== Personal life ==
Rice's father, Dan, played college baseball as a pitcher for Brown University.

In March 2026, Ben's original partnered with Rice largely due to the coincidence of his name. To kick off this partnership, Mars (The parent company) announced that they will provide contribution up to 22,000 meals for kids facing food insecurity through No Kid Hungry, inspired by the number on the back of Rice's jersey. "When your name is already built into the partnership, the only thing left to do is swing for the fences," said Rice.

Rice speaks fluent Spanish, having learned it in middle school and continued taking classes in college. His Hispanic teammates often nickname him "Ben Arroz" (the Spanish word for "rice"). He practiced the language further when he reached the minor leagues, finding it particularly helpful for communicating with Spanish-speaking pitchers.
