= 2026 New York Yankees season =

2026 New York Yankees
- American League Wild Card winners
- League: American League
- Division: East
- Ballpark: Yankee Stadium
- City: New York
- Record: 93–68 (.578)
- Divisional place: 2nd
- Owners: Yankee Global Enterprises
- President: Randy Levine
- General manager: Brian Cashman
- Manager: Aaron Boone
- Television: YES Network; Amazon Prime Video (Michael Kay, Ryan Ruocco, Paul O'Neill, Joe Girardi, David Cone, Meredith Marakovits, Jack Curry, Justin Shackil, Bob Lorenz, Nancy Newman, Todd Frazier, Nick Swisher)
- Radio: WFAN SportsRadio 66 AM / 101.9 FM; New York Yankees Radio Network (Dave Sims, Emmanuel Berbari, Suzyn Waldman); La X 96.3 HD2 TUDN Radio; Cadena Radio Yankees (Francisco Rivera, Rickie Ricardo)

The 2026 New York Yankees season was the 124th season for the New York Yankees of Major League Baseball, their ninth under manager Aaron Boone, and 29th season under general manager Brian Cashman. Going into the last game of the regular season, they hoped to tie their 94–68 record from 2024 and 2025. However, due to the September 2026 nor'easter, their game vs. the Baltimore Orioles was rained out after a significant delay, leading to both teams only playing 161 games.

On September 24, CC Sabathia's No. 52 jersey was retired and he was honored with a plaque in Monument Park.

On September 14, 2026, the Yankees clinched a playoff berth for the third consecutive season following an 8–3 win over the Minnesota Twins coupled with the Toronto Blue Jays’ 6–5 loss to the Detroit Tigers that same day. They swept their division rival Boston Red Sox in the American League Wild Card Series in two games and advanced to the American League Division Series, where they were swept in three games by their divisional rival Tampa Bay Rays.

Cam Schlittler won the American League Cy Young award in a unanimous vote.

== Offseason ==
=== Transactions ===
==== 2025 ====
- November 21 – re-signed left-handed relief pitcher Ryan Yarbrough to a one-year, $2.5 million contract.
- December 30 – re-signed infielder Amed Rosario to a one-year, $2.5 million contract.

==== 2026 ====
- January 9 – claimed right-handed relief pitcher Kaleb Ort off waivers from the Houston Astros.
- January 13 – acquired left-handed starting pitcher Ryan Weathers from the Miami Marlins in exchange for infield prospects Dylan Jasso and Juan Matheus and outfield prospects Dillon Lewis and Brendan Jones.
- January 15 – re-signed right-handed relief pitcher Paul Blackburn to a one-year, $2 million contract.
- January 22 – claimed utility player Marco Luciano off waivers from the Baltimore Orioles.
- January 23 – claimed outfielder Michael Siani off waivers from the Los Angeles Dodgers.
- January 26 – re-signed outfielder/first baseman Cody Bellinger to a five-year, $162.5 million contract.
- January 27– claimed right-handed starting pitcher Dom Hamel off waivers from the Texas Rangers.
- January 28 – acquired right-handed relief pitcher Angel Chivilli from the Colorado Rockies in exchange for infield prospect T. J. Rumfield.
- January 29 – traded left-handed relief pitcher Jayvien Sandridge to the Los Angeles Angels in exchange for cash considerations.
- February 4 – claimed outfielder Yanquiel Fernández off waivers from the Colorado Rockies.
- February 5 – claimed right-handed starting pitcher Osvaldo Bido off waivers from the Los Angeles Angels.
- February 9 – acquired infielder Max Schuemann from the Athletics in exchange for pitching prospect Luis Burgos.
- February 12 – re-signed first baseman Paul Goldschmidt to a one-year, $4 million contract.
- March 22 – traded infielder Jorbit Vivas to the Washington Nationals in exchange for pitching prospect Sean Paul Liñan.
- March 24 – traded infielder Zack Short to the Washington Nationals in exchange for cash considerations.

== Regular Season ==
=== Transactions ===
==== 2026 ====
- April 19 – acquired right-handed relief pitcher Wilmy Sanchez from the Houston Astros in exchange for infielder Braden Shewmake.
- August 1 – traded right-handed relief pitcher Camilo Doval to the Pittsburgh Pirates in exchange for catching prospect Omar Alfonzo and outfield prospect Luis Cruz.
- August 2 – acquired infielder Luis García Jr. from the Washington Nationals in exchange for right-handed pitchers Jake Bird and Yovanny Cruz and pitching prospects Jack Cebert and Ben Grable.
- August 3 – acquired outfielder Heliot Ramos from the San Francisco Giants in exchange for infield prospect Kaeden Kent and pitching prospect and Henry Lalane.
- August 19 – traded catcher Christian Bethancourt to the Pittsburgh Pirates in exchange for cash considerations.

=== Season standings ===
==== American League East ====
AL East
Team	W	L	Pct.	GB	Home	Road
Tampa Bay Rays	98	64	.605	—	55‍–‍26	43‍–‍38
New York Yankees	93	68	.578	4½	46‍–‍34	47‍–‍34
Boston Red Sox	87	75	.537	11	41‍–‍40	46‍–‍35
Baltimore Orioles	79	82	.491	18½	39‍–‍42	40‍–‍40
Toronto Blue Jays	79	83	.488	19	42‍–‍39	37‍–‍44

==== American League Wild Card ====
Division leaders
Team	W	L	Pct.
Tampa Bay Rays	98	64	.605
Cleveland Guardians	85	77	.525
Houston Astros	81	81	.500

Wild Card teams (Top 3 teams qualify for postseason)
Team	W	L	Pct.	GB
New York Yankees	93	68	.578	+9½
Boston Red Sox	87	75	.537	+3
Chicago White Sox	84	78	.519	—
Texas Rangers	80	82	.494	4
Baltimore Orioles	79	82	.491	4½
Toronto Blue Jays	79	83	.488	5
Minnesota Twins	77	85	.475	7
Detroit Tigers	76	86	.469	8
Seattle Mariners	76	86	.469	8
Kansas City Royals	69	93	.426	15
Athletics	64	98	.395	20
Los Angeles Angels	62	100	.383	22

==== Record vs. opponents ====
2026 American League record Source: MLB Standings Grid – 2026
Team	ATH	BAL	BOS	CWS	CLE	DET	HOU	KC	LAA	MIN	NYY	SEA	TB	TEX	TOR	NL
Athletics	—	2–4	3–4	1–5	1–5	0–6	6–7	2–5	8–5	3–3	3–3	7–6	0–6	7–6	2–4	19–29
Baltimore	4–2	—	4–9	4–2	3–4	4–2	5–1	5–1	3–3	3–3	3–9	3–4	8–5	2–4	7–6	21–27
Boston	4–3	9–4	—	6–0	3–3	5–2	1–5	5–1	4–2	1–5	6–7	3–3	6–7	3–3	4–9	27–21
Chicago	5–1	2–4	0–6	—	7–6	9–4	2–5	9–4	4–2	8–5	3–4	3–3	2–4	4–2	5–1	21–27
Cleveland	5–1	4–3	3–3	6–7	—	10–3	2–4	7–6	6–0	6–7	2–4	4–3	1–5	2–4	2–4	25–23
Detroit	6–0	2–4	2–5	4–9	3–10	—	2–5	6–7	3–3	5–8	4–2	4–2	4–2	4–2	3–3	24–24
Houston	7–6	1–5	5–1	5–2	4–2	5–2	—	4–2	7–6	2–4	3–3	3–10	2–4	9–4	3–3	21–27
Kansas City	5–2	1–5	1–5	4–9	6–7	7–6	2–4	—	5–1	8–5	0–6	5–1	2–5	1–5	3–3	19–29
Los Angeles	5–8	3–3	2–4	2–4	0–6	3–3	6–7	1–5	—	3–4	3–4	6–7	3–3	8–5	2–4	15–33
Minnesota	3–3	3–3	5–1	5–8	7–6	8–5	4–2	5–8	4–3	—	3–3	2–4	1–5	5–1	4–3	18–30
New York	3–3	9–3	7–6	4–3	4–2	2–4	3–3	6–0	4–3	3–3	—	4–2	6–7	4–2	7–6	27–21
Seattle	6–7	4–3	3–3	3–3	3–4	2–4	10–3	1–5	7–6	4–2	2–4	—	1–5	5–8	2–4	23–25
Tampa Bay	6–0	5–8	7–6	4–2	5–1	2–4	4–2	5–2	3–3	5–1	7–6	5–1	—	4–3	9–4	27–21
Texas	6–7	4–2	3–3	2–4	4–2	2–4	4–9	5–1	5–8	1–5	2–4	8–5	3–4	—	6–1	25–23
Toronto	4–2	6–7	9–4	1–5	4–2	3–3	3–3	3–3	4–2	3–4	6–7	4–2	4–9	1–6	—	24–24

Updated with the results of all games through September 27, 2026.

== Game log ==
Legend
	Yankees win
	Yankees loss
	Postponement
	Clinched playoff spot
**Bold**	Yankees team member

2026 Game Log: 93–68 (Home: 46–34; Away: 47–34)
March/April: 20–11 (Home: 8–5; Away: 12–6)

#	Date	Opponent	Score	Win	Loss	Save	Stadium	Attendance	Record
1	March 25	@ Giants	7–0	**Fried** (1–0)	Webb (0–1)	—	Oracle Park	40,856	1–0
2	March 27	@ Giants	3–0	**Schlittler** (1–0)	Ray (0–1)	**Bednar** (1)	Oracle Park	40,273	2–0
3	March 28	@ Giants	3–1	**Bird** (1–0)	Mahle (0–1)	**Bednar** (2)	Oracle Park	40,634	3–0
4	March 30	@ Mariners	1–2	Brash (1–0)	**Blackburn** (0–1)	—	T-Mobile Park	27,291	3–1
5	March 31	@ Mariners	5–0	**Fried** (2–0)	Gilbert (0–1)	—	T-Mobile Park	32,790	4–1
6	April 1	@ Mariners	5–3	**Schlittler** (2–0)	Kirby (1–1)	**Bednar** (3)	T-Mobile Park	23,415	5–1
7	April 3	Marlins	8–2	**Warren** (1–0)	Pérez (0–1)	—	**Yankee Stadium**	48,788	6–1
8	April 4	Marlins	9–7	**Headrick** (1–0)	Petersen (1–1)	**Bednar** (4)	**Yankee Stadium**	44,150	7–1
9	April 5	Marlins	6–7	King (1–0)	**Bird** (1–1)	Bender (1)	**Yankee Stadium**	34,807	7–2
10	April 7	Athletics	5–3	**Cruz** (1–0)	Leiter Jr. (0–1)	**Bednar** (5)	**Yankee Stadium**	39,853	8–2
11	April 8	Athletics	2–3	Alvarado (2–0)	**Bednar** (0–1)	Kuhnel (1)	**Yankee Stadium**	38,147	8–3
12	April 9	Athletics	0–1	Springs (1–0)	**Weathers** (0–1)	Harris (1)	**Yankee Stadium**	40,392	8–4
13	April 10	@ Rays	3–5	Matz (3–0)	**Gil** (0–1)	Baker (2)	Tropicana Field	20,511	8–5
14	April 11	@ Rays	4–5 (10)	Sulser (1–0)	**Bednar** (0–2)	—	Tropicana Field	21,620	8–6
15	April 12	@ Rays	4–5	Rasmussen (1–0)	**Schlittler** (2–1)	Englert (1)	Tropicana Field	20,796	8–7
16	April 13	Angels	11–10	**Blackburn** (1–1)	Romano (0–1)	—	**Yankee Stadium**	35,789	9–7
17	April 14	Angels	1–7	Detmers (1–1)	**Weathers** (0–2)	—	**Yankee Stadium**	37,792	9–8
18	April 15	Angels	5–4	**Bednar** (1–2)	Romano (0–2)	—	**Yankee Stadium**	41,019	10–8
19	April 16	Angels	4–11	Aldegheri (1–0)	**Fried** (2–1)	—	**Yankee Stadium**	38,424	10–9
20	April 17	Royals	4–2	**Doval** (1–0)	Lange (0–1)	**Bednar** (6)	**Yankee Stadium**	44,244	11–9
21	April 18	Royals	13–4	**Warren** (2–0)	Cameron (1–1)	—	**Yankee Stadium**	42,070	12–9
22	April 19	Royals	7–0	**Weathers** (1–2)	Ragans (0–4)	—	**Yankee Stadium**	40,198	13–9
23	April 21	@ Red Sox	4–0	**Gil** (1–1)	Early (1–1)	—	Fenway Park	34,391	14–9
24	April 22	@ Red Sox	4–1	**Fried** (3–1)	Suárez (1–2)	—	Fenway Park	34,049	15–9
25	April 23	@ Red Sox	4–2	**Schlittler** (3–1)	Coulombe (0–1)	**Bednar** (7)	Fenway Park	36,565	16–9
26	April 24	@ Astros	12–4	**Warren** (3–0)	McCullers Jr. (1–2)	—	Daikin Park	37,852	17–9
27	April 25	@ Astros	8–3	**Cruz** (2–0)	Teng (1–1)	—	Daikin Park	38,399	18–9
28	April 26	@ Astros	4–7	Arrighetti (3–0)	**Gil** (1–2)	—	Daikin Park	35,622	18–10
29	April 27	@ Rangers	4–2	**Fried** (4–1)	Leiter (1–2)	**Bednar** (8)	Globe Life Field	29,601	19–10
30	April 28	@ Rangers	3–2	**Schlittler** (4–1)	deGrom (2–1)	**Bednar** (9)	Globe Life Field	26,767	20–10
31	April 29	@ Rangers	0–3	Eovaldi (3–4)	**Rodríguez** (0–1)	Latz (2)	Globe Life Field	30,408	20–11

May: 16–12 (Home: 9–4; Away: 7–8)

#	Date	Opponent	Score	Win	Loss	Save	Stadium	Attendance	Record
32	May 1	Orioles	7–2	**Warren** (4–0)	Povich (1–1)	—	**Yankee Stadium**	41,239	21–11
33	May 2	Orioles	9–4	**Weathers** (2–2)	Bradish (1–4)	—	**Yankee Stadium**	46,049	22–11
34	May 3	Orioles	11–3	**Cruz** (3–0)	Wolfram (1–1)	—	**Yankee Stadium**	43,416	23–11
35	May 4	Orioles	12–1	**Schlittler** (5–1)	Baz (1–3)	—	**Yankee Stadium**	36,802	24–11
36	May 5	Rangers	7–4	**Headrick** (2–0)	deGrom (2–2)	**Bednar** (10)	**Yankee Stadium**	38,360	25–11
37	May 6	Rangers	1–6	Eovaldi (4–4)	**Warren** (4–1)	—	**Yankee Stadium**	40,269	25–12
38	May 7	Rangers	9–2	**Headrick** (3–0)	Gore (2–3)	—	**Yankee Stadium**	42,729	26–12
39	May 8	@ Brewers	0–6	Misiorowski (3–2)	**Fried** (4–2)	Drohan (1)	American Family Field	38,051	26–13
40	May 9	@ Brewers	3–4 (10)	Ashby (7–0)	**Cruz** (3–1)	—	American Family Field	35,628	26–14
41	May 10	@ Brewers	3–4	Uribe (2–1)	**Bednar** (1–3)	—	American Family Field	40,175	26–15
42	May 11	@ Orioles	2–3	Enns (1–0)	**Headrick** (3–1)	Nunez (2)	Camden Yards	23,160	26–16
43	May 12	@ Orioles	6–2	**Warren** (5–1)	Rogers (2–4)	—	Camden Yards	20,344	27–16
44	May 13	@ Orioles	0–7	Bradish (2–5)	**Fried** (4–3)	—	Camden Yards	14,521	27–17
45	May 15	@ Mets	5–2	**Schlittler** (6–1)	Holmes (4–4)	—	Citi Field	40,004	28–17
46	May 16	@ Mets	3–6	Peterson (2–4)	**Rodón** (0–1)	Williams (6)	Citi Field	41,067	28–18
47	May 17	@ Mets	6–7 (10)	Williams (3–1)	**Hill** (0–1)	—	Citi Field	40,232	28–19
48	May 18	Blue Jays	7–6	**Blackburn** (2–1)	Rodríguez (0–1)	**Bednar** (11)	**Yankee Stadium**	39,082	29–19
49	May 19	Blue Jays	5–4	**Warren** (6–1)	Cease (3–2)	**Doval** (1)	**Yankee Stadium**	37,181	30–19
50	May 20	Blue Jays	1–2	Yesavage (2–1)	**Schlittler** (6–2)	Varland (6)	**Yankee Stadium**	37,497	30–20
51	May 21	Blue Jays	0–2	Macko (1–0)	**Rodón** (0–2)	Hoffman (4)	**Yankee Stadium**	40,249	30–21
52	May 22	Rays	2–4	Seymour (3–0)	**Hill** (0–2)	Baker (14)	**Yankee Stadium**	41,358	30–22
―	May 23	Rays	Postponed due to rain. Makeup date September 22.						
53	May 24	Rays	2–0	**Hill** (1–2)	Kelly (3–2)	—	**Yankee Stadium**	41,396	31–22
54	May 25	@ Royals	4–3	**Hill** (2–2)	Erceg (3–2)	**Bednar** (12)	Kauffman Stadium	26,162	32–22
55	May 26	@ Royals	15–1	**Schlittler** (7–2)	Falter (0–2)	**Yarbrough** (1)	Kauffman Stadium	21,947	33–22
56	May 27	@ Royals	7–0	**Cole** (1–0)	Cameron (2–4)	—	Kauffman Stadium	17,007	34–22
57	May 29	@ Athletics	8–2	**Rodón** (1–2)	Severino (2–6)	—	Sutter Health Park	12,254	35–22
58	May 30	@ Athletics	4–6	Ginn (3–3)	**Weathers** (2–3)	Barlow (2)	Sutter Health Park	12,361	35–23
59	May 31	@ Athletics	13–8	**Warren** (7–1)	Lopez (4–3)	—	Sutter Health Park	12,515	36–23

June: 12–14 (Home: 5–8; Away: 7–6)

#	Date	Opponent	Score	Win	Loss	Save	Stadium	Attendance	Record
60	June 2	Guardians	4–9	Holderman (4–1)	**Schlittler** (7–3)	—	**Yankee Stadium**	41,045	36–24
61	June 3	Guardians	4–5	Williams (9–3)	**Cole** (1–1)	Smith (21)	**Yankee Stadium**	37,683	36–25
62	June 4	Guardians	2–1	**Headrick** (4–1)	Heuer (0–1)	**Bednar** (13)	**Yankee Stadium**	39,504	37–25
63	June 5	Red Sox	3–5	Gray (7–1)	**Weathers** (2–4)	Chapman (13)	**Yankee Stadium**	43,750	37–26
―	June 6	Red Sox	Postponed due to rain. Makeup date August 29.						
64	June 7	Red Sox	6–1	**Hill** (3–2)	Slaten (0–3)	—	**Yankee Stadium**	46,144	38–26
65	June 8	@ Guardians	7–5 (10)	**Bednar** (2–3)	Armstrong (1–1)	—	Progressive Field	29,517	39–26
66	June 9	@ Guardians	3–2	**Doval** (2–0)	Herrin (0–2)	**Cruz** (1)	Progressive Field	27,154	40–26
67	June 10	@ Guardians	8–4	**Rodón** (2–2)	Messick (6–3)	—	Progressive Field	31,586	41–26
68	June 12	@ Blue Jays	5–8	Yesavage (3–3)	**Weathers** (2–5)	Varland (12)	Rogers Centre	41,596	41–27
69	June 13	@ Blue Jays	3–1	**Cruz** (4–1)	Varland (3–2)	**Bednar** (14)	Rogers Centre	42,364	42–27
70	June 14	@ Blue Jays	8–3	**Doval** (3–0)	Fisher (2–2)	—	Rogers Centre	41,596	43–27
71	June 16	White Sox	12–2	**Cole** (2–1)	Martin (9–3)	**Yarbrough** (2)	**Yankee Stadium**	36,723	44–27
72	June 17	White Sox	10–5	**Rodón** (3–2)	Kay (6–2)	—	**Yankee Stadium**	38,558	45–27
73	June 18	White Sox	1–5	Burke (4–4)	**Cruz** (4–2)	—	**Yankee Stadium**	44,809	45–28
74	June 19	Reds	5–0	**Schlittler** (8–3)	Lowder (3–4)	—	**Yankee Stadium**	42,420	46–28
75	June 20	Reds	2–10	Abbott (5–4)	**Warren** (7–2)	—	**Yankee Stadium**	46,089	46–29
76	June 21	Reds	1–4	Burns (9–1)	**Rodríguez** (0–2)	Santillan (5)	**Yankee Stadium**	46,046	46–30
77	June 22	@ Tigers	3–5	Valdez (4–5)	**Cole** (2–2)	Vest (2)	Comerica Park	24,284	46–31
78	June 23	@ Tigers	4–3	**Rodón** (4–2)	Mize (2–5)	**Bednar** (15)	Comerica Park	27,157	47–31
79	June 24	@ Tigers	4–2	**Weathers** (3–5)	Skubal (3–4)	**Bednar** (16)	Comerica Park	23,567	48–31
80	June 25	@ Red Sox	3–6	Early (7–5)	**Schlittler** (8–4)	Chapman (15)	Fenway Park	36,307	48–32
81	June 26	@ Red Sox	1–6	Tolle (4–5)	**Warren** (7–3)	—	Fenway Park	33,353	48–33
82	June 27	@ Red Sox	1–4	Bennett (2–3)	**Cole** (2–3)	Chapman (16)	Fenway Park	36,026	48–34
83	June 28	@ Red Sox	4–5 (10)	Slaten (1–4)	**Cruz** (4–3)	—	Fenway Park	34,573	48–35
84	June 29	Tigers	3–7	Mize (3–5)	**Weathers** (3–6)	—	**Yankee Stadium**	40,506	48–36
85	June 30	Tigers	3–9	Skubal (4–4)	**Schlittler** (8–5)	—	**Yankee Stadium**	37,211	48–37

July: 14–11 (Home: 4–6; Away: 10–5)

#	Date	Opponent	Score	Win	Loss	Save	Stadium	Attendance	Record
86	July 1	Tigers	2–6 (11)	Montero (5–5)	**Doval** (3–1)	—	**Yankee Stadium**	37,117	48–38
87	July 3	Twins	5–2	**Cole** (3–3)	Paredes (0–2)	**Bednar** (17)	**Yankee Stadium**	45,104	49–38
88	July 4	Twins	4–11	Rogers (4–3)	**Beck** (0–1)	—	**Yankee Stadium**	40,156	49–39
89	July 5	Twins	1–6	Ryan (6–5)	**Weathers** (3–7)	—	**Yankee Stadium**	39,155	49–40
90	July 6	@ Rays	5–1	**Schlittler** (9–5)	Jax (4–6)	—	Tropicana Field	18,129	50–40
91	July 7	@ Rays	4–6	Seymour (6–1)	**Warren** (7–4)	Baker (24)	Tropicana Field	18,115	50–41
92	July 8	@ Rays	0–3	McClanahan (8–5)	**Cole** (3–4)	Baker (25)	Tropicana Field	19,373	50–42
93	July 9	@ Rays	12–4	**Yarbrough** (1–0)	Rasmussen (7–5)	—	Tropicana Field	18,255	51–42
94	July 10	@ Nationals	5–3	**Bednar** (3–3)	Krook (0–1)	—	Nationals Park	38,085	52–42
95	July 11	@ Nationals	4–2	**Headrick** (5–1)	Beeter (3–2)	**Bednar** (18)	Nationals Park	34,054	53–42
96	July 12	@ Nationals	5–3	**Yarbrough** (2–0)	Alvarez (2–3)	**Blackburn** (1)	Nationals Park	33,699	54–42
**96th All-Star Game in Philadelphia, Pennsylvania**
97	July 17	Dodgers	1–2	Dreyer (4–1)	**Cole** (3–5)	Scott (14)	**Yankee Stadium**	46,450	54–43
―	July 18	Dodgers	Postponed due to rain. Makeup date July 19.						
98	July 19 (1)	Dodgers	2–8	Yamamoto (10–6)	**Schlittler** (9–6)	—	**Yankee Stadium**	43,305	54–44
99	July 19 (2)	Dodgers	2–1	**Bednar** (4–3)	Phillips (0–1)	—	**Yankee Stadium**	43,378	55–44
100	July 20	Pirates	8–5	**Chivilli** (1–0)	Ashcraft (9–4)	**Cruz** (2)	**Yankee Stadium**	42,348	56–44
―	July 21	Pirates	Postponed due to rain. Makeup date July 22.						
101	July 22 (1)	Pirates	3–5 (10)	Montgomery (3–3)	**Cruz** (4–4)	Soto (13)	**Yankee Stadium**	43,290	56–45
102	July 22 (2)	Pirates	2–0	**Blackburn** (3–1)	Eisert (2–2)	**Hill** (1)	**Yankee Stadium**	41,064	57–45
103	July 24	@ Phillies	1–0	**Schlittler** (10–6)	Luzardo (9–5)	**Bednar** (19)	Citizens Bank Park	43,165	58–45
104	July 25	@ Phillies	3–1	**Weathers** (4–7)	Backhus (1–1)	**Bednar** (20)	Citizens Bank Park	44,562	59–45
105	July 26	@ Phillies	4–11	Sánchez (13–4)	**Warren** (7–5)	—	Citizens Bank Park	42,799	59–46
106	July 27	@ White Sox	9–5	**Headrick** (6–1)	Hudson (3–4)	**Bednar** (21)	Rate Field	22,357	60–46
107	July 28	@ White Sox	3–2	**Cole** (4–5)	Kay (7–5)	**Bednar** (22)	Rate Field	33,743	61–46
108	July 29	@ White Sox	5–6 (12)	Hicks (1–1)	**Yarbrough** (2–1)	—	Rate Field	31,694	61–47
109	July 30	@ White Sox	1–2 (11)	Domínguez (4–3)	**Cruz** (4–5)	—	Rate Field	29,384	61–48
110	July 31	@ Cubs	2–0	**Warren** (8–5)	Imanaga (7–9)	**Bednar** (23)	Wrigley Field	40,129	62–48

August: 16–12 (Home: 11–8; Away: 5–4)

#	Date	Opponent	Score	Win	Loss	Save	Stadium	Attendance	Record
111	August 1	@ Cubs	2–5	Thornton (4–4)	**Cruz** (4–6)	Thielbar (3)	Wrigley Field	39,630	62–49
112	August 2	@ Cubs	2–1	**Cole** (5–5)	Rea (8–8)	**Bednar** (24)	Wrigley Field	40,057	63–49
113	August 3	Cardinals	7–13	Graceffo (7–1)	**Chivilli** (1–1)	—	**Yankee Stadium**	38,151	63–50
114	August 4	Cardinals	2–0	**Weathers** (5–7)	Dobbins (2–2)	**Bednar** (25)	**Yankee Stadium**	41,081	64–50
115	August 5	Cardinals	1–3	Pallante (12–6)	**Warren** (8–6)	O'Brien (27)	**Yankee Stadium**	37,425	64–51
116	August 7	Braves	3–2 (10)	**Bednar** (5–3)	Kinley (6–5)	—	**Yankee Stadium**	42,297	65–51
117	August 8	Braves	5–4	**Cole** (6–5)	Sale (12–7)	**Bednar** (26)	**Yankee Stadium**	45,222	66–51
118	August 9	Braves	1–2 (10)	Iglesias (1–2)	**Blackburn** (3–2)	Kinley (1)	**Yankee Stadium**	42,533	66–52
119	August 11	Mariners	4–1	**Hill** (4–2)	Rucker (0–4)	**Bednar** (27)	**Yankee Stadium**	41,407	67–52
120	August 12	Mariners	10–5	**Blackburn** (4–2)	Speier (2–3)	—	**Yankee Stadium**	41,714	68–52
121	August 13	Mariners	0–1	Gilbert (9–7)	**Fried** (4–4)	Muñoz (21)	**Yankee Stadium**	41,842	68–53
122	August 14	@ Blue Jays	1–3	Bieber (4–2)	**Cole** (6–6)	Varland (27)	Rogers Centre	42,816	68–54
123	August 15	@ Blue Jays	1–4	Miles (5–2)	**Headrick** (6–2)	Varland (28)	Rogers Centre	42,580	68–55
124	August 16	@ Blue Jays	4–3 (10)	**Bednar** (6–3)	Fisher (3–4)	**Hill** (2)	Rogers Centre	42,351	69–55
125	August 18	@ Orioles	3–1	**De Los Santos** (1–0)	Baz (4–13)	**Bednar** (28)	Camden Yards	23,257	70–55
126	August 19	@ Orioles	5–3	**Headrick** (7–2)	Sanders (1–1)	**Bednar** (29)	Camden Yards	26,453	71–55
127	August 20	@ Orioles	6–1	**Cole** (7–6)	Bradish (7–12)	**Yarbrough** (3)	Camden Yards	29,200	72–55
128	August 21	Blue Jays	3–1	**Schlittler** (11–6)	Arrighetti (7–6)	**Bednar** (30)	**Yankee Stadium**	45,062	73–55
129	August 22	Blue Jays	3–4	Cease (8–5)	**Weathers** (5–8)	Varland (29)	**Yankee Stadium**	46,231	73–56
130	August 23	Blue Jays	8–3	**Blackburn** (5–2)	Soriano (10–7)	—	**Yankee Stadium**	41,802	74–56
131	August 25	Astros	7–9	Abreu (5–3)	**Headrick** (7–3)	Hader (19)	**Yankee Stadium**	43,229	74–57
132	August 26	Astros	9–3	**Blackburn** (6-2)	Sousa (1-3)	—	**Yankee Stadium**	40,269	75–57
133	August 27	Astros	1–5	Wesneski (4–1)	**Cole** (7–7)	—	**Yankee Stadium**	41,203	75–58
134	August 28	Red Sox	1–0	**Schlittler** (12-6)	Sandoval (1-3)	**Bednar** (31)	**Yankee Stadium**	43,476	76–58
135	August 29 (1)	Red Sox	0–6	Bennett (9–6)	**Rodón** (4–3)	—	**Yankee Stadium**	47,314	76–59
136	August 29 (2)	Red Sox	9–2	**Blackburn** (7-2)	Bello (5-7)	—	**Yankee Stadium**	44,266	77–59
137	August 30	Red Sox	16–1	**Warren** (9–6)	Suárez (5–4)	—	**Yankee Stadium**	45,256	78–59
138	August 31	@ Angels	1–10	Ureña (9–9)	**Rodríguez** (0–3)	—	Angel Stadium	37,613	78–60

September: 15–8 (Home: 9–3; Away: 6–5)

#	Date	Opponent	Score	Win	Loss	Save	Stadium	Attendance	Record
139	September 1	@ Angels	7–3	**Cole** (8–7)	Rodriguez (4–6)	—	Angel Stadium	37,678	79–60
140	September 2	@ Angels	6–3 (10)	**Bednar** (7–3)	Murphy (0–2)	—	Angel Stadium	38,372	80–60
141	September 4	@ Padres	2–3 (10)	Miller (5–2)	**Blackburn** (7–3)	—	Petco Park	41,345	80–61
142	September 5	@ Padres	5–1	**Rodón** (5–3)	Ray (11–8)	—	Petco Park	40,946	81–61
143	September 6	@ Padres	3–4	King (10–9)	**Cole** (8–8)	Miller (33)	Petco Park	41,061	81–62
144	September 8	Rockies	5–3	**Schlittler** (13–6)	Hughes (0–7)	**Bednar** (32)	**Yankee Stadium**	46,211	82–62
145	September 9	Rockies	6–1	**Warren** (10–6)	Sugano (12–9)	—	**Yankee Stadium**	34,413	83–62
146	September 10	Rockies	10–3	**Schreiber** (2–3)	Feltner (5–10)	—	**Yankee Stadium**	40,706	84–62
147	September 11	Mets	6–4	**Rodón** (6–3)	McLean (11–9)	**Bednar** (33)	**Yankee Stadium**	47,410	85–62
148	September 12	Mets	2–12	Thornton (4–5)	**Cole** (8–9)	—	**Yankee Stadium**	46,864	85–63
149	September 13	Mets	2–0	**Schlittler** (14–6)	Scott (4–5)	**Bednar** (34)	**Yankee Stadium**	45,508	86–63
150	September 14	@ Twins	8–3	**Hill** (5–2)	Morris (4–8)	**Schreiber** (2)	Target Field	24,204	87–63
151	September 15	@ Twins	8–1	**Fried** (5–4)	Ober (7–6)	—	Target Field	27,822	88–63
152	September 16	@ Twins	4–5 (13)	Nance (3–3)	**Schreiber** (2–4)	—	Target Field	21,887	88–64
153	September 18	@ Diamondbacks	9–2	**Cole** (9–9)	Rodríguez (15–7)	—	Chase Field	41,910	89–64
154	September 19	@ Diamondbacks	3–5	Morillo (5–4)	**Fulmer** (0–1)	—	Chase Field	47,918	89–65
155	September 20	@ Diamondbacks	4–8	Martínez (3–0)	**Headrick** (7–4)	—	Chase Field	37,755	89–66
156	September 22 (1)	Rays	2–0	**Rodón** (7–3)	Martinez (15–5)	**Bednar** (35)	**Yankee Stadium**	41,421	90–66
157	September 22 (2)	Rays	1–6	Rasmussen (16–5)	**Fried** (5–5)	—	**Yankee Stadium**	38,656	90–67
158	September 23	Rays	9–2	**Cole** (10–9)	Englert (0–4)	—	**Yankee Stadium**	42,238	91–67
159	September 24	Rays	6–4	**Hanner** (1–0)	Matz (5–6)	—	**Yankee Stadium**	44,136	92–67
160	September 25 (1)	Orioles	2–10	Suárez (3–0)	**Beck** (0–2)	—	**Yankee Stadium**	(Game 2)	92–68
161	September 25 (2)	Orioles	6–3	**Warren** (11–6)	Young (9–6)	—	**Yankee Stadium**	46,656	93–68
–	September 27	Orioles	Canceled due to rain						

=== Opening Day starters ===
No.	Player	Pos.
Batters
12	Trent Grisham	CF
99	Aaron Judge	RF
35	Cody Bellinger	LF
22	Ben Rice	1B
27	Giancarlo Stanton	DH
13	Jazz Chisholm Jr.	2B
78	José Caballero	SS
19	Ryan McMahon	3B
28	Austin Wells	C
Starting pitcher
54	Max Fried	

== Postseason ==
=== Postseason game log ===
2026 Postseason game log (2–3) (Home 2–1; Away 0−2)
American League Wild Card Series: 2–0

#	Date	Opponent	Stadium	Score	Win	Loss	Save	Attendance	Record
1	September 29	Red Sox	Yankee Stadium	9–0	Schlittler (1–0)	Tolle (0–1)	–	48,437	1–0
2	September 30	Red Sox	Yankee Stadium	9–2	Fried (1–0)	Gray (0–1)	–	49,004	2–0

American League Division Series: 0–3

#	Date	Opponent	Stadium	Score	Win	Loss	Save	Attendance	Record
1	October 3	@ Rays	Tropicana Field	0–1	Rasmussen (1–0)	Cole (0–1)	Baker (1)	40,542	0–1
2	October 5	@ Rays	Tropicana Field	2–5	Booser (1–0)	Schlittler (1–1)	Baker (2)	40,226	0–2
3	October 7	Rays	Yankee Stadium	3–4	Seymour (1–0)	Fried (1–1)	Baker (3)	48,865	0–3

=== Postseason rosters ===
Playoff rosters
American League Wild Card Series

- Pitchers: 53 David Bednar 58 Paul Blackburn 45 Gerrit Cole 54 Max Fried 47 Brent Headrick 55 Carlos Rodón 31 Cam Schlittler 56 John Schreiber 29 Will Warren 33 Ryan Yarbrough
- Catchers: 39 Ali Sánchez 28 Austin Wells
- Infielders: 72 José Caballero 13 Jazz Chisholm Jr. 26 Luis García Jr. 48 Paul Goldschmidt 96 George Lombard Jr. 19 Ryan McMahon 14 Amed Rosario 11 Anthony Volpe
- Outfielders: 35 Cody Bellinger 12 Trent Grisham 78 Spencer Jones 34 Heliot Ramos
- Designated hitters: 22 Ben Rice 27 Giancarlo Stanton

American League Division Series

- Pitchers: 53 David Bednar 58 Paul Blackburn 45 Gerrit Cole 54 Max Fried 47 Brent Headrick 55 Carlos Rodón 31 Cam Schlittler 56 John Schreiber 29 Will Warren 40 Ryan Weathers 33 Ryan Yarbrough
- Catchers: 39 Ali Sánchez 28 Austin Wells
- Infielders: 72 José Caballero 13 Jazz Chisholm Jr. 26 Luis García Jr. 48 Paul Goldschmidt 96 George Lombard Jr. 19 Ryan McMahon 22 Ben Rice 11 Anthony Volpe
- Outfielders: 35 Cody Bellinger 12 Trent Grisham 78 Spencer Jones 34 Heliot Ramos
- Designated hitters: 27 Giancarlo Stanton

== Roster ==
2026 New York Yankees
Roster
Pitchers: 89 Brendan Beck; 53 David Bednar; 59 Jake Bird; 58 Paul Blackburn; 74 Kervin Castro; 57 Angel Chivilli; 45 Gerrit Cole; 97 Alexander Cornielle; 63 Fernando Cruz; 96 Yovanny Cruz; 73 Yerry De Los Santos; 75 Camilo Doval; 54 Max Fried; 43 Michael Fulmer; 81 Luis Gil; 93 Bradley Hanner; 47 Brent Headrick; 41 Tim Hill; 55 Carlos Rodón; 71 Elmer Rodríguez; 31 Cam Schlittler; 36 Clarke Schmidt; 56 John Schreiber; 56 Justin Topa; 29 Will Warren; 40 Ryan Weathers; 33 Ryan Yarbrough	Catchers: 25 J. C. Escarra; 39 Ali Sánchez; 28 Austin Wells; Infielders: 72 José Caballero; 95 Oswaldo Cabrera; 13 Jazz Chisholm Jr.; 26 Luis García Jr.; 48 Paul Goldschmidt; 96 George Lombard Jr.; 19 Ryan McMahon; 22 Ben Rice; 14 Amed Rosario; 11 Anthony Volpe	Outfielders: 35 Cody Bellinger; 24 Jasson Domínguez; 34 Randal Grichuk; 12 Trent Grisham; 78 Spencer Jones; 99 Aaron Judge; 34 Heliot Ramos; 30 Max Schuemann; Other batters: 27 Giancarlo Stanton	Manager: 17 Aaron Boone; Coaches: 65 Brad Ausmus (bench); 77 Matt Blake (pitching); -- Rainiero Coa (bullpen catcher); 85 Dan Fiorito (first base/infield); 79 Preston Claiborne (bullpen/assistant pitching); 83 Desi Druschel (assistant pitching); 78 Casey Dykes (assistant hitting); 84 Jake Hirst (assistant hitting); 67 Luis Rojas (third base/outfield); 82 James Rowson (hitting); -- Peter Serruto (bullpen catcher); 76 Tanner Swanson (field coordinator/catching)

== Player stats ==
= Indicates team leader

= Indicates league leader

=== Batting ===
Note: G = Games played; AB = At bats; R = Runs scored; H = Hits; 2B = Doubles; 3B = Triples; HR = Home runs; RBI = Runs batted in; SB = Stolen bases; BB = Walks; AVG = Batting average; SLG = Slugging average

Player	G	AB	R	H	2B	3B	HR	RBI	SB	BB	AVG	SLG
Ben Rice	154	573	105	151	24	4	41	97	3	85	.264	.534
Cody Bellinger	132	496	73	131	25	3	17	73	12	59	.264	.429
Jazz Chisholm Jr.	137	471	69	109	16	3	19	55	41	56	.231	.399
Trent Grisham	121	418	67	88	19	2	18	59	9	61	.211	.395
José Caballero	136	411	50	95	13	0	14	51	34	29	.231	.365
Paul Goldschmidt	105	345	44	87	13	1	18	52	1	29	.252	.452
Austin Wells	122	334	39	62	7	0	14	32	4	48	.186	.332
Ryan McMahon	124	328	33	70	14	0	11	41	3	28	.213	.357
Spencer Jones	86	261	36	64	13	1	11	40	10	25	.245	.429
Aaron Judge	66	237	45	57	10	0	18	41	5	43	.241	.511
Amed Rosario	87	227	28	54	6	1	10	34	3	14	.238	.405
Anthony Volpe	70	220	24	54	12	1	2	28	12	25	.245	.336
Jasson Domínguez	57	209	22	47	12	0	6	14	8	10	.225	.368
Luis García Jr.	43	159	21	42	6	0	7	16	1	9	.264	.434
George Lombard Jr.	42	152	23	36	4	1	7	22	2	10	.237	.414
Heliot Ramos	38	116	12	23	7	1	4	12	1	15	.198	.379
Giancarlo Stanton	24	90	8	23	6	0	3	14	1	6	.256	.422
Ali Sánchez	51	86	7	21	2	0	1	8	0	1	.244	.302
J.C. Escarra	32	85	8	16	5	1	0	7	0	6	.188	.271
Max Schuemann	42	72	17	14	6	0	2	8	3	12	.194	.361
Randal Grichuk	16	31	8	6	4	0	0	2	0	1	.194	.323
Oswaldo Cabrera	3	9	0	0	0	0	0	0	0	0	.000	.000
Totals	161	5330	739	1250	224	19	223	706	153	572	.235	.409

=== Pitching ===
Note: W = Wins; L = Losses; ERA = Earned run average; G = Games pitched; GS = Games started; SV = Saves; IP = Innings pitched; H = Hits allowed; R = Runs allowed; ER = Earned runs allowed; BB = Walks allowed; SO = Strikeouts

Player	W	L	ERA	G	GS	SV	IP	H	R	ER	BB	SO
Cam Schlittler	14	6	1.95	33	33	0	193.2	129	52	42	49	239
Will Warren	11	6	3.92	32	29	0	156.0	159	83	68	54	158
Ryan Weathers	5	8	3.60	25	25	0	137.1	130	61	55	38	143
Gerrit Cole	10	9	3.61	22	22	0	127.0	115	52	51	25	131
Max Fried	5	5	2.80	20	20	0	112.2	79	35	35	33	104
Paul Blackburn	7	3	1.69	62	2	1	85.0	60	19	16	33	69
Carlos Rodón	7	3	2.67	16	16	0	84.1	51	30	25	38	91
Brent Headrick	7	4	2.18	81	0	0	78.1	68	20	19	27	98
David Bednar	7	3	2.47	64	0	35	69.1	52	25	19	20	76
Ryan Yarbrough	2	1	3.69	38	2	3	63.1	54	33	26	23	49
Tim Hill	5	2	4.60	67	0	2	58.2	54	33	30	13	25
Fernando Cruz	4	6	3.13	61	0	2	54.2	41	23	19	32	67
Camilo Doval	3	1	4.54	44	0	1	39.2	38	29	20	18	39
Jake Bird	1	1	5.93	36	0	0	30.1	36	20	20	11	31
Luis Gil	1	2	4.61	9	4	0	27.1	21	16	14	18	17
Elmer Rodríguez	0	3	5.40	6	6	0	26.2	26	16	16	16	21
Yerry De Los Santos	1	0	2.05	16	0	0	22.0	20	9	5	8	17
Angel Chivilli	1	1	3.78	15	0	0	16.2	14	9	7	7	16
Brendan Beck	0	2	9.95	4	2	0	12.2	13	14	14	8	13
John Schreiber	1	1	1.64	11	0	1	11.0	8	3	2	4	4
Michael Fulmer	0	1	4.50	12	0	0	10.0	9	7	5	6	14
Bradley Hanner	1	0	8.59	5	0	0	7.1	11	7	7	1	7
Kervin Castro	0	0	1.42	5	0	0	6.1	3	1	1	2	8
Yovanny Cruz	0	0	1.69	4	0	0	5.1	3	1	1	1	6
Justin Topa	0	0	0.00	2	0	0	3.0	4	1	0	1	3
Max Schuemann	0	0	0.00	1	0	0	1.0	1	0	0	1	0
Alexander Cornielle	0	0	18.00	1	0	0	1.0	3	2	2	1	2
Clarke Schmidt	0	0	0.00	1	0	0	0.2	2	0	0	0	2
Totals	93	68	3.24	161	161	45	1441.1	1204	601	519	488	1450

== Farm system ==
Level	Team	League	Manager
AAA	Scranton/Wilkes-Barre RailRiders	International League	Shelley Duncan
AA	Somerset Patriots	Eastern League	James Cooper
High-A	Hudson Valley Renegades	South Atlantic League	Aaron Bossi
Low-A	Tampa Tarpons	Florida State League	Zak Wasserman
Rookie	FCL Yankees	Florida Complex League	Santiago Nessy
Rookie	DSL NYY Bombers	Dominican Summer League	Teuris Olivares
Rookie	DSL NYY Yankees	Dominican Summer League	Carlos Vidal
