= Bedner =

Bedner is a surname. Notable people with the surname include:

- Al Bedner (1898–1988), American football player
- Andrew Bedner (born 1981), American man

== See also ==
- Bednář
- Bender (surname)
- Benner (surname)
- Berner
