= Bednář =

Bednář (feminine: Bednářová) is a Czech surname. Bednár (feminine: Bednárová) is a Slovak surname. Both are meaning 'cooper'. Notable people with the surname include:

== Sports ==
- Andy Bednar (1908–1937), American baseball player
- David Bednar (baseball) (born 1994), American baseball player
- Franz Bednar (1910–1987), Austrian bobsledder
- George Bednar (1942–2007), American football player and beverage executive
- Jan Bednář (born 2002), Czech ice hockey player
- Jared Bednar (born 1972), Canadian ice hockey player and coach
- Jaroslav Bednář (born 1976), Czech ice hockey player
- Karolína Bednářová (born 1986), Czech volleyball player
- Marcela Bednar, German sprint canoer
- Markéta Bednářová (born 1981), Czech basketball player
- Martin Bednár (born 1999), Slovak footballer
- Pavel Bednář (born 1970), Czech sprint canoer
- Robert Bednar (1911–1993), Austrian bobsledder
- Roman Bednář (born 1983), Czech footballer
- Vladimír Bednár (born 1979), Slovak footballer
- Vladimír Bednář (born 1948), Czech ice hockey player
- Will Bednar (born 2000), American baseball player

== Other ==
- David Bednar (general manager) (born 1952), American-Canadian theatre manager
- David A. Bednar (born 1952), American educator and religious leader
- Eva Bednářová (1937–1986), Czech printmaker
- Kamil Bednář (1912–1972), Czech poet, translator and writer
- Otta Bednářová (1927–2023), Czech journalist and writer
- Štefan Bednár (1909–1976), Slovak painter

== Fictional characters ==
- Captain Bednar, a police captain in the novel The Man with the Golden Arm

== See also ==
- Murder of Breck Bednar
