= Bradley Hanner =

American baseball player (born 1999)

New York Yankees – No. 93
- Pitcher
- Born: February 10, 1999 (age 27); Rhoadesville, Virginia, U.S.
- Bats: Right Throws: Right

MLB debut
- August 14, 2026, for the New York Yankees

MLB statistics (through 2026 season)
- Win–loss record: 1–0
- Earned run average: 8.59
- Strikeouts: 7
- Stats at Baseball Reference

Teams
- New York Yankees (2026–present)

Bradley Thomas Hanner (born February 10, 1999) is an American professional baseball pitcher for the New York Yankees of Major League Baseball (MLB). He debuted in MLB in 2026.

== Career ==
=== Amateur career ===
Hanner attended Orange County High School in Orange, Virginia. He enrolled at Patrick & Henry Community College, where he played college baseball for two years.

=== Minnesota Twins ===
The Minnesota Twins selected Hanner in the 21st round, with the 629th overall selection, of the 2019 Major League Baseball draft. He made his professional debut with the rookie-level Gulf Coast League Twins, recording a 2–3 record and 4.39 ERA with 30 strikeouts across 11 appearances. Hanner did not play in a game in 2020 due to the cancellation of the minor league season because of the COVID-19 pandemic.

Hanner returned to action in 2021 with the Single-A Fort Myers Mighty Mussels, where he logged a 2–1 record and 7.13 ERA with 49 strikeouts in 41 2/3 innings pitched across 26 appearances. He made 39 appearances for the High-A Cedar Rapids Kernels during the 2022 campaign, accumulating a 7–4 record and 4.60 ERA with 65 strikeouts over 48 2/3 innings of work.

=== Cleveland Guardians ===
On December 7, 2022, Hanner was selected by the Cleveland Guardians in the minor league phase of the Rule 5 draft. He spent the 2023 season with the Double-A Akron RubberDucks, posting an 8–6 record and 2.78 ERA with 70 strikeouts and eight saves across 41 games.

Hanner split the 2024 campaign between Akron and the Triple-A Columbus Clippers. In 44 appearances out of the bullpen for the two affiliates, he posted a cumulative 8–4 record and 2.91 ERA with 66 strikeouts and six saves across 55 2/3 innings of work.

Hanner spent the 2025 season with Triple-A Columbus, registering a 4–4 record and 4.74 ERA with 62 strikeouts and two saves in 49 1/3 innings pitched across 42 relief outings. Hanner elected free agency following the season on November 6, 2025.

=== New York Yankees ===
On December 16, 2025, Hanner signed a minor league contract with the New York Yankees. He began the 2026 season with the Triple-A Scranton/Wilkes-Barre RailRiders, compiling a 4–1 record and 1.99 ERA with 50 strikeouts and three saves across 32 relief appearances. On July 18, 2026, the Yankees signed Hanner to a major league contract and optioned him back to Scranton. On August 11, Hanner was promoted to the major leagues for the first time. Since then, Hanner has been DFA'd back to Triple-A and recalled several times, usually as a bulk reliever in blowouts

On September 24 2026, Hanner earned his first career win during a series vs. the Tampa Bay Rays, pitching 2 innings of no run ball. After getting out of a jam, he became the pitcher of record after a 2 run George Lombard Jr. home run in the bottom of the 8th, before pitching a scoreless 9th.

== See also ==
- Rule 5 draft results
