= David Bednar =

David Bednar may refer to:

- David Bednar (general manager) (born 1952), former general manager of the Canadian National Exhibition Association
- David A. Bednar (born 1952), LDS Church leader, former BYU-Idaho president
- David Bednar (baseball) (born 1994), MLB pitcher
