= Andrew Bedner =

American man at the center of a bioethical controversy

Andrew Bedner is an American man who was at the center of a bioethical controversy regarding the rights of parents to make medical decisions for children they have allegedly abused.

In August 2008, Bedner, a resident of White River Junction, Vermont, was charged with intentionally injuring his eight-week-old daughter during a beating. The child's injuries proved severe, and Bedner faced a long prison sentence if convicted. However, Bedner did not face murder charges, as his critically ill daughter, referred to as C.B., remained on life support.

The state of New Hampshire, where C.B. was hospitalized, sought to exclude Bedner from decisions regarding whether to remove his daughter from life support. The state cited his inherent conflict of interest in the case in that C.B.'s death might lead to a murder charge for Bedner. C.B. eventually died, but the case generated considerable public debate and stimulated a controversy among bioethics scholars.

Dr. Jacob Appel of Mount Sinai Hospital used the case to launch a drive for revising statutes governing parental decision-making in cases where abuse is alleged. According to Appel, such "dual motives" create a compelling reason for the state to suspend parental decision-making over end-of-life decisions. In 2009, leading bioethics scholar Thaddeus Mason Pope profiled the case on his medical futility website.

== See also ==
- Child abuse
- Bioethics
