= Clayton Beeter =

American baseball player (born 1998)

Washington Nationals – No. 39
- Pitcher
- Born: October 9, 1998 (age 27); Fort Worth, Texas, U.S.
- Bats: Right Throws: Right

MLB debut
- March 29, 2024, for the New York Yankees

MLB statistics (through 2026 season)
- Win–loss record: 6–8
- Earned run average: 4.44
- Strikeouts: 85
- Stats at Baseball Reference

Teams
- New York Yankees (2024–2025); Washington Nationals (2025–present)

Clayton Howard Beeter (born October 9, 1998) is an American professional baseball pitcher for the Washington Nationals of Major League Baseball (MLB). He played college baseball for the Texas Tech Red Raiders. The Los Angeles Dodgers selected Beeter in the second round of the 2020 MLB draft, and he made his MLB debut in 2024 with the New York Yankees.

== Amateur career ==
Beeter attended Birdville High School in North Richland Hills, Texas, where he played football and baseball. In 2017, his senior year, he compiled a 0.81 earned run average (ERA) and 106 strikeouts over 55 innings pitched. He also batted .417 with two home runs.

Undrafted in the 2017 Major League Baseball draft, Beeter enrolled at Texas Tech University to play college baseball for the Texas Tech Red Raiders. He suffered an arm injury in the fall of freshman year at Texas Tech, and underwent Tommy John surgery, thus forcing him to miss the 2018 season. He returned healthy as a redshirt freshman in 2019, going 0–3 with a 3.48 ERA over 20 2/3 relief innings, striking out forty. In 2020, his redshirt sophomore season, Beeter moved into the starting rotation, and was named the starting pitcher for Texas Tech's season opener. Beeter went 2–1 with a 2.14 ERA over four starts before the college baseball season was cut short due to the COVID-19 pandemic.

== Professional career ==
=== Los Angeles Dodgers ===
The Los Angeles Dodgers selected Beeter in the second round, with the 66th overall pick, of the 2020 Major League Baseball draft. He signed with the Dodgers for a $1.27 million signing bonus. He did not play a minor league game in 2020 since the season was cancelled due to the COVID-19 pandemic.

To begin the 2021 season, he was assigned to the Great Lakes Loons of the High-A Central. On July 24, Beeter pitched two innings of a combined no-hitter against the Lake County Captains alongside Bobby Miller, Jake Cantleberry, and Cameron Gibbens. After making 22 starts and pitching to a 0–4 record, a 3.13 ERA, and 55 strikeouts over 37 1/3 innings, he was promoted to the Tulsa Drillers of the Double-A Central in mid-August. Making five starts with Tulsa, Beeter went 0–2 with a 4.80 ERA over 15 innings. He returned to Tulsa to begin the 2022 season.

=== New York Yankees ===
On August 2, 2022, Beeter was traded to the New York Yankees in exchange for Joey Gallo. He was assigned to the Somerset Patriots of the Double-A Eastern League. Over 25 games (23 starts) between Tulsa and Somerset, Beeter went 0–3 with a 4.56 ERA and 129 strikeouts over 77 innings. To begin the 2023 season, he was assigned back to Somerset. In late June, he was promoted to the Scranton/Wilkes-Barre RailRiders of the Triple-A International League. He was selected to represent the Yankees (alongside Spencer Jones) at the 2023 All-Star Futures Game. Over 27 games (26 starts), Beeter went 9–7 with a 3.62 ERA and 165 strikeouts over 131 2/3 innings.

On November 14, 2023, the Yankees added Beeter to their 40-man roster to protect him from the Rule 5 draft. On March 25, 2024, the Yankees announced that Beeter had earned one of the team's final Opening Day bullpen roles alongside Nick Burdi. He made his MLB debut on March 29, pitching one inning of relief without allowing a run, (with a rare 3-pitch inning), and was optioned to Triple-A Scranton/Wilkes-Barre the next day. In three games during his rookie camping, Beeter logged a 4.91 ERA with five strikeouts over 3 2/3 innings pitched.

Entering the 2025 season, the Yankees announced that Beeter would be used primarily as a relief pitcher. He made two appearances for the team, struggling to a 0–1 record and 14.73 ERA with one strikeout across 3 2/3 innings pitched.

=== Washington Nationals ===
On July 26, 2025, Beeter, along with Browm Martinez, was traded to the Washington Nationals in exchange for Amed Rosario. Beeter made 24 relief appearances for the Nationals and went 0-2 with a 2.49 ERA and 32 strikeouts across 21 2/3 innings.

In 2026, Beeter missed close to a month during the season with right forearm soreness. The Nationals optioned Beeter to the Triple-A Rochester Red Wings on September 12, after Beeter spent much of the year as Washington's primary closer but struggled in the second half. He made 50 relief appearances for the team and ended the season with a 6–5 record, a 4.50 ERA, 47 strikeouts and 19 saves over 48 innings pitched. With Rochester, he was the losing pitcher in the 2026 Triple-A Championship Game, giving up a bases-clearing double to the Oklahoma City Comets' Alek Thomas in the 10th inning.
