= Alexander Cornielle =

Dominican baseball player (born 2001)

Free agent
- Pitcher
- Born: August 22, 2001 (age 25); Santo Domingo, Dominican Republic
- Bats: Right Throws: Right

MLB debut
- September 25, 2026, for the New York Yankees

MLB statistics (through 2026 season)
- Win–loss record: 0–0
- Earned run average: 18.00
- Strikeouts: 2

Teams
- New York Yankees (2026)

Alexander Cornielle (born August 22, 2001) is a Dominican professional baseball pitcher who is a free agent.

== Career ==
While pitching for the Scranton/Wilkes-Barre RailRiders, Cornielle was named the International League's Pitcher of the Week for August 24-30, 2026, and Pitcher of the Month for August 2026. The Yankees promoted him to the major leagues on September 25. He made his debut that night in the 9th inning against the Baltimore Orioles, giving up a home run on his second pitch to Coby Mayo and giving up one more run on a double before closing out the game. His first strikeout was Rece Hinds. He was designated for assignment on September 29. On October 1, he cleared waivers and was sent outright to the FCL Yankees. He elected free agency on November 2.
