= Amed Rosario =

Dominican baseball player (born 1995)

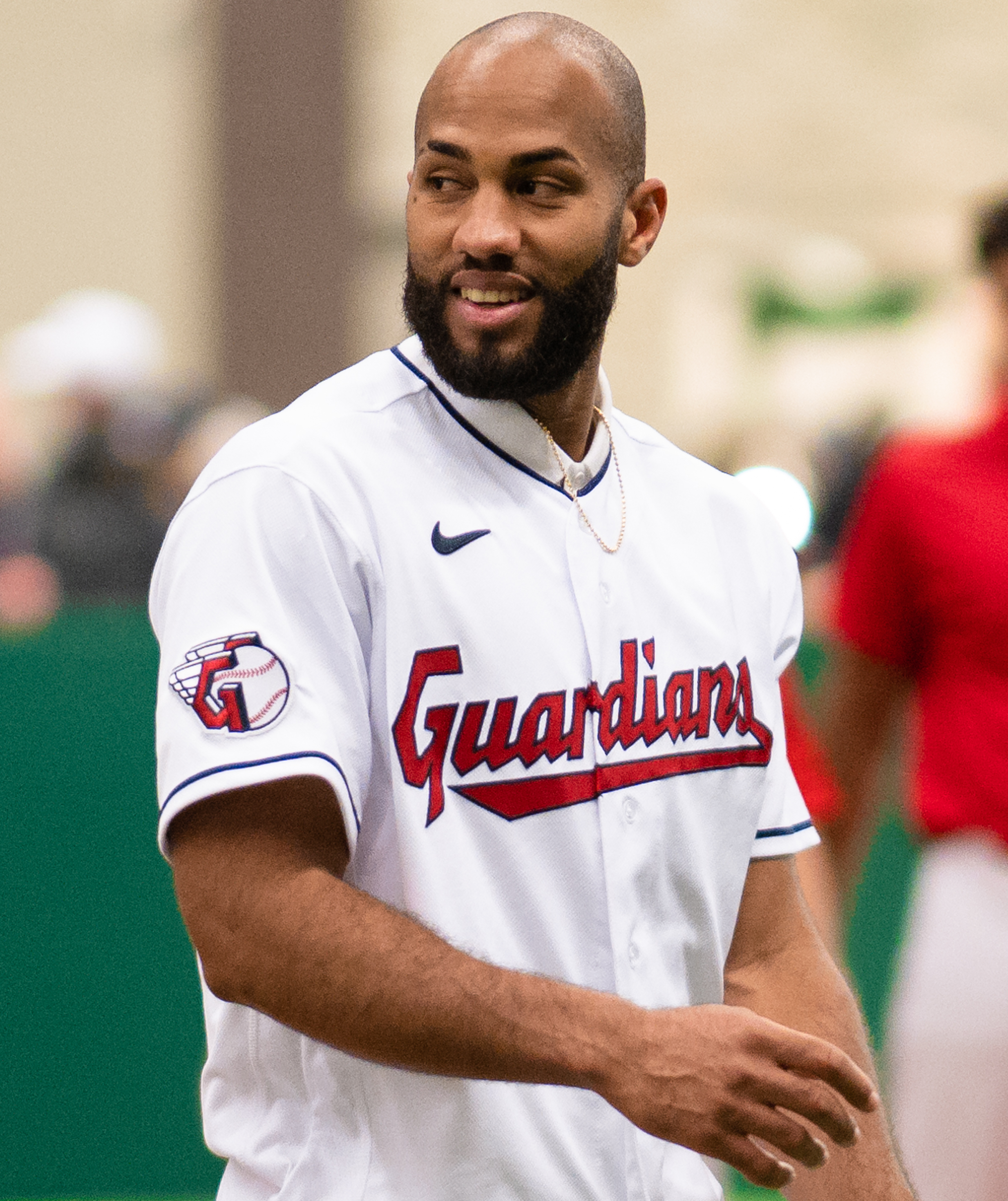
- Rosario with the Cleveland Guardians in 2023

Free agent
- Utility player
- Born: November 20, 1995 (age 30); Santo Domingo, Distrito Nacional, Dominican Republic
- Bats: Right Throws: Right

MLB debut
- August 1, 2017, for the New York Mets

MLB statistics (through 2026 season)
- Batting average: .271
- Home runs: 79
- Runs batted in: 423
- Stats at Baseball Reference

Teams
- New York Mets (2017–2020); Cleveland Indians / Guardians (2021–2023); Los Angeles Dodgers (2023); Tampa Bay Rays (2024); Los Angeles Dodgers (2024); Cincinnati Reds (2024); Washington Nationals (2025); New York Yankees (2025–2026)
Medals
Men's baseball
Representing Dominican Republic
World Baseball Classic
Bronze medal – third place	2026 Miami	Team

Germán Amed Rosario Valdez (born November 20, 1995) is a Dominican professional baseball utility player who is a free agent. He has played in Major League Baseball (MLB) for the New York Mets, Cleveland Indians/Guardians, Los Angeles Dodgers, Tampa Bay Rays, Cincinnati Reds, Washington Nationals, and New York Yankees. He made his MLB debut in 2017 with the Mets.

== Career ==
=== New York Mets ===
Rosario signed with the New York Mets as an international free agent in July 2012 for $1.75 million. It was the largest international signing bonus given by the Mets. Rosario made his professional debut in 2013 with the Kingsport Mets. He started 2014 with the Brooklyn Cyclones and was promoted to the Savannah Sand Gnats in September. Rosario was promoted to the Double-A Binghamton Mets on June 23, 2016. He was named to the 2016 All Star Futures Game and went 1-for-2 in the game. Rosario ended 2016 with a .324 batting average, 5 home runs, and 71 RBIs.

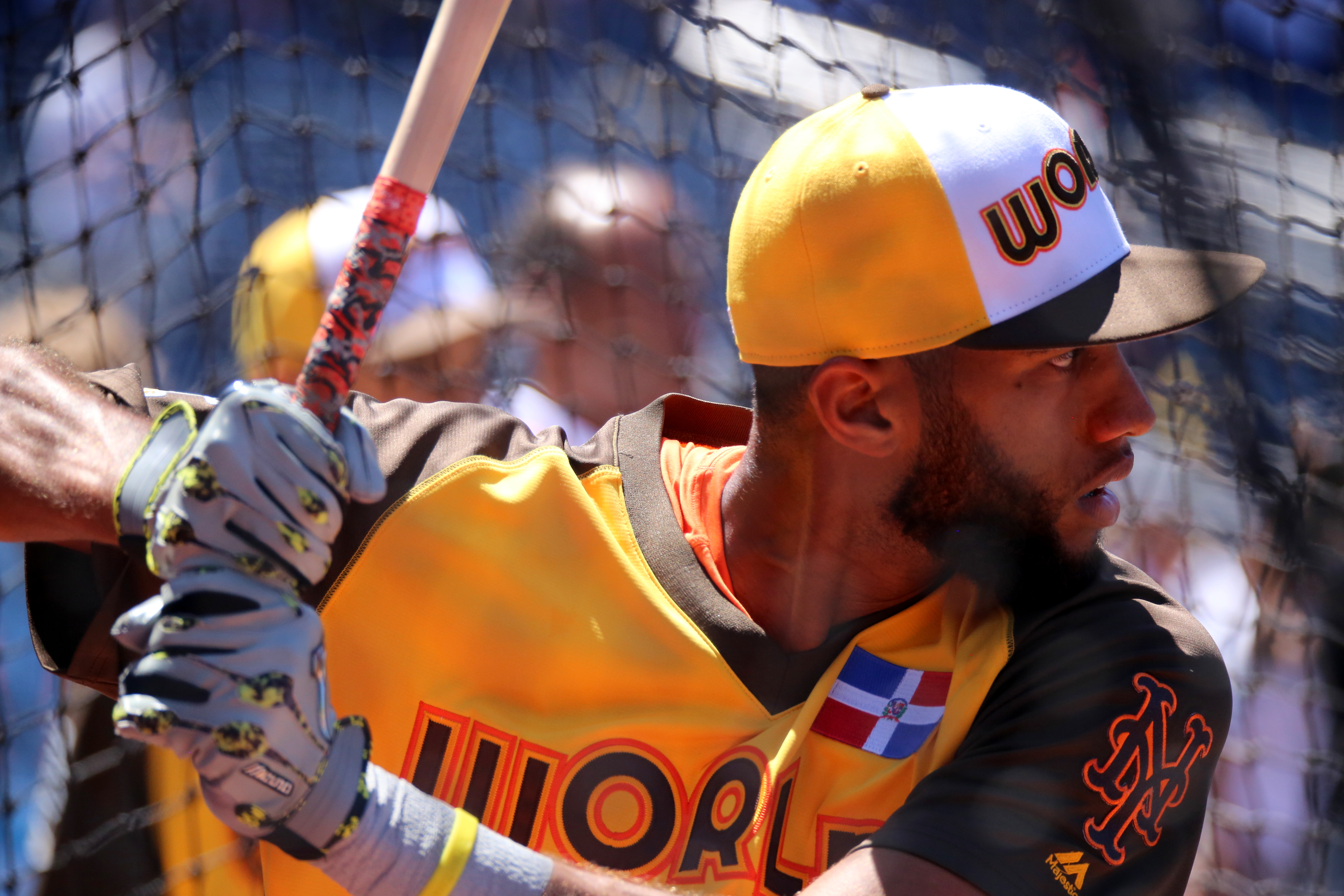
Rosario before the 2016 All-Star Futures Game

The Mets added Rosario to their 40-man roster after the 2016 season, in order to protect him from the Rule 5 draft. Rosario was assigned to the Las Vegas 51s of the Triple-A Pacific Coast League (PCL) to start the 2017 season. In April 2017, Rosario was declared the top prospect in baseball by writer Keith Law. Rosario was named to the Triple-A All-Star Game and the All-Star Futures Game for 2017. Rosario earned PCL All-Star honors as well as being awarded the 2017 PCL Rookie of the Year.

Rosario made his MLB debut on August 1, 2017, against the Colorado Rockies at Coors Field. In that game, Rosario recorded his first career Major League hit, which came off of Scott Oberg. On August 11, 2017, Rosario hit his first career Major League home run off of Héctor Neris. He had his first career multi-home run game on May 20, 2018, hitting two home runs against the Arizona Diamondbacks.

In 2019, he batted .287/.323/.432 with 15 home runs and 72 RBIs, and while he stole 19 bases he tied for the major league lead in caught stolen with 10. He had the lowest pull percentage of all NL batters (30.4%). On defense in 2019, he had -10 Defensive Runs Saved (DRS), the worst in the National League among qualifying shortstops. However, Rosario led the National League in singles.

On August 28, 2020, Rosario hit a walk-off home run against the New York Yankees at Yankee Stadium. The Mets were the home team because they were making up for a previously cancelled game. It was the first time a visiting player had hit a walk-off home run since Ed McKean hit one for the St. Louis Perfectos against the Cleveland Spiders in 1899. During the 2020 season, Rosario hit .252/.272/.371 with 4 home runs and 15 RBIs in 46 games.

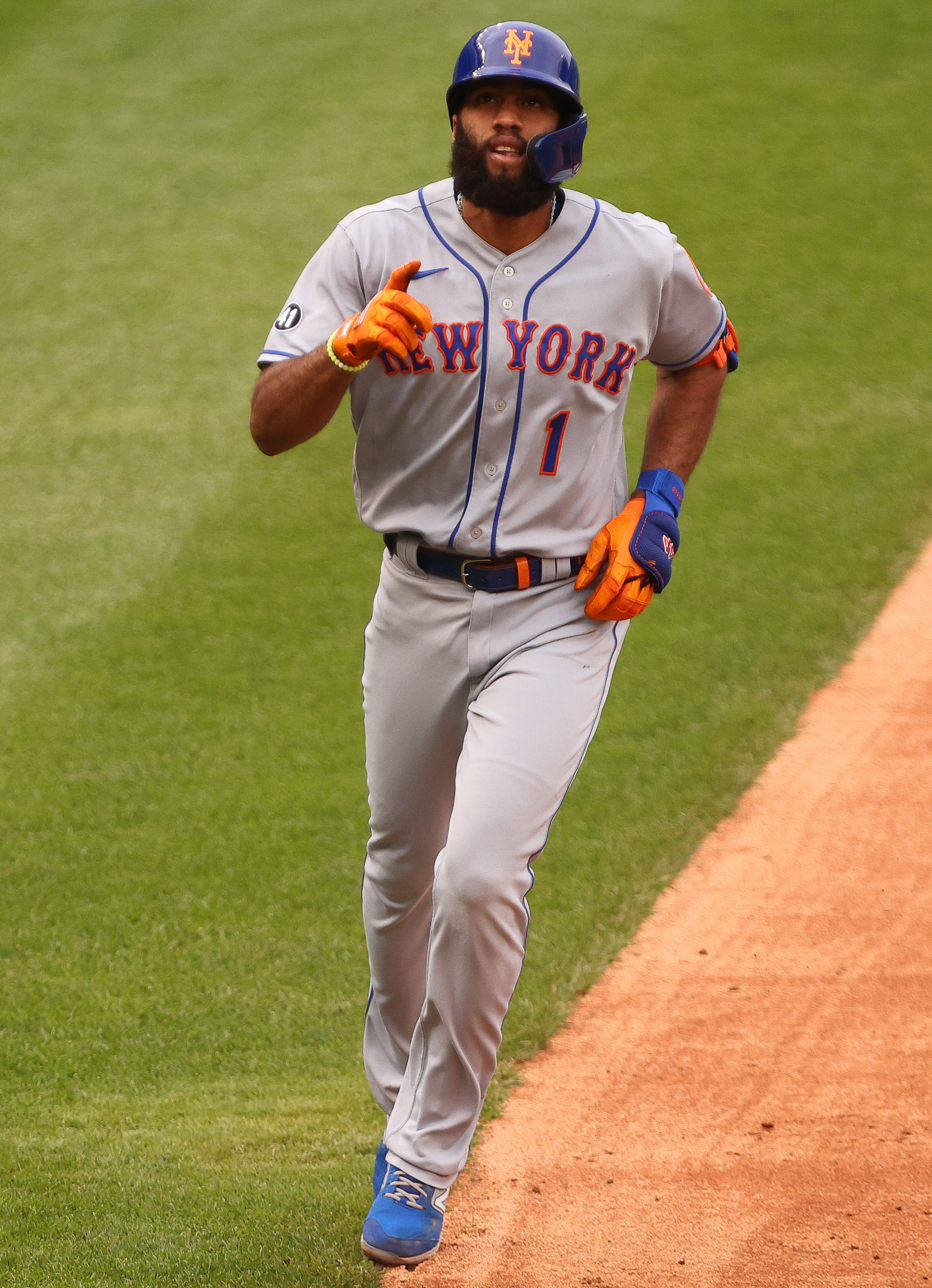
Rosario with the Mets in 2020

=== Cleveland Indians / Guardians ===
On January 7, 2021, the Mets traded Rosario, Andrés Giménez, Josh Wolf, and Isaiah Greene to the Cleveland Indians for Francisco Lindor and Carlos Carrasco. In March 2021, the Indians began transitioning Rosario into a role as an outfielder with the help of coach Kyle Hudson, implicitly giving the starting shortstop job to Giménez. During Rosario's first three innings in the outfield during a spring training game, he committed three errors which led to eight unearned runs being scored. Rosario's only prior experience in the outfield was three innings spent in left field with the Mets in 2019. Giménez was demoted to the minors on May 18. Around that same time, Rosario became the team's regular starting shortstop. On August 31 against the Kansas City Royals, Rosario went 5-for-5 with a career-high 5 RBIs. It included two home runs, one being the first inside-the-park home run in his career. Rosario finished the 2021 season batting .282/.321/.409 with 11 home runs, 57 RBIs, 77 runs and 13 stolen bases in 141 games.

In 2022 he led the major leagues with nine triples, and had the lowest walk percentage among major league batters (3.7%), while batting .283/.312/.403 with 86 runs, 11 home runs, and 18 steals in 22 attempts. He led the major leagues in infield hits, with 35.

=== Los Angeles Dodgers ===
On July 26, 2023, the Guardians traded Rosario to the Los Angeles Dodgers for Noah Syndergaard and cash considerations. With the Dodgers, he played primarily second base and was used as a platoon player against left handed pitchers. He played in 48 games, hitting .256 and became a free agent following the season.

=== Tampa Bay Rays ===
On February 20, 2024, Rosario signed a one-year, $1.5 million contract with the Tampa Bay Rays. He played in 76 games, hitting .307 with two home runs and 26 RBI.

=== Los Angeles Dodgers (second stint) ===
On July 29, 2024, the Rays traded Rosario to the Dodgers in exchange for minor league pitcher Michael Flynn. He had 11 at-bats over five games for the Dodgers, with three hits before he was designated for assignment on August 12.

=== Cincinnati Reds ===
On August 18, 2024, Rosario was claimed off waivers by the Cincinnati Reds. In 22 games for the Reds, he batted .158/.186/.211 with one home run, four RBI, and three stolen bases. Rosario was designated for assignment by Cincinnati on October 28. He elected free agency on October 31.

=== Washington Nationals ===
On January 8, 2025, Rosario signed a one-year, $2 million contract with the Washington Nationals. In 46 appearances for the Nationals, Rosario batted .270/.310/.426 with five home runs, 18 RBI, and one stolen base.

=== New York Yankees ===
Rosario (right) with the Yankees in 2025

On July 26, 2025, the Nationals traded Rosario to the New York Yankees in exchange for Clayton Beeter and Browm Martínez. He made 16 appearances for the Yankees, batting .303/.303/.485 with one home run and five RBIs.

On December 30, 2025, Rosario re-signed with the Yankees on a one-year, $2.5 million contract.

== International career ==
On October 29, 2018, Rosario was selected to play for the MLB All-Stars during the 2018 MLB Japan All-Star Series.

== Personal life ==
Rosario's sister, Aniana, is married to Willi Castro.
