= Cam Schlittler =

American baseball player (born 2001)

- Schlittler with the Yankees in 2026

New York Yankees – No. 31
- Pitcher
- Born: February 5, 2001 (age 25); Walpole, Massachusetts, U.S.
- Bats: Right Throws: Right

MLB debut
- July 9, 2025, for the New York Yankees

MLB statistics (through 2026 season)
- Win–loss record: 18–9
- Earned run average: 2.23
- Strikeouts: 323
- Stats at Baseball Reference

Teams
- New York Yankees (2025–present)

Career highlights and awards
- All-Star (2026); AL Cy Young Award (2026); All-MLB First Team (2026); AL ERA leader (2026)

Cameron John Schlittler (born February 5, 2001) is an American professional baseball pitcher for the New York Yankees of Major League Baseball (MLB). He played college baseball for the Northeastern Huskies and was selected by the Yankees in the seventh round of the 2022 MLB draft. He made his MLB debut in 2025. Schlittler was named to his first All-Star Game during the 2026 season and won the American League Cy Young Award that year.

== Career ==
=== Amateur career ===
Schlittler attended Walpole High School in Walpole, Massachusetts, and Northeastern University, where he played college baseball for the Northeastern Huskies. In 2021, he was named the Coastal Athletic Association's rookie of the year and a freshman All-American. He then played collegiate summer baseball with the Harwich Mariners of the Cape Cod Baseball League. For Northeastern, Schlittler had a 14–9 win–loss record with a 2.62 earned run average (ERA) and 180 strikeouts across 182 innings pitched in 31 games, 30 of which were games started. His fastball typically averaged 92–93 miles per hour (148–150 km/h) while playing for the Huskies.

=== Minor leagues ===
The New York Yankees selected Schlittler in the seventh round of the 2022 Major League Baseball draft. He signed with the Yankees, receiving a $205,000 signing bonus.

Schlittler spent his first professional season in 2023 with the Florida Complex League Yankees, Tampa Tarpons, and Hudson Valley Renegades. He started 2024 with Hudson Valley and was promoted to the Somerset Patriots during the season and pitched one game with the Scranton/Wilkes-Barre Railriders. That season, he was named the South Atlantic League Pitcher of the Year. By the end of the 2024 season, his fastball averaged 93 miles per hour (150 km/h).

During spring training in 2025, Schlittler's fastball averaged 95 miles per hour (153 km/h). He started the 2025 season with Double-A Somerset before earning a promotion to Triple-A Scranton/Wilkes-Barre in June. He made five starts for the RailRiders.

=== Major leagues ===
==== 2025 ====
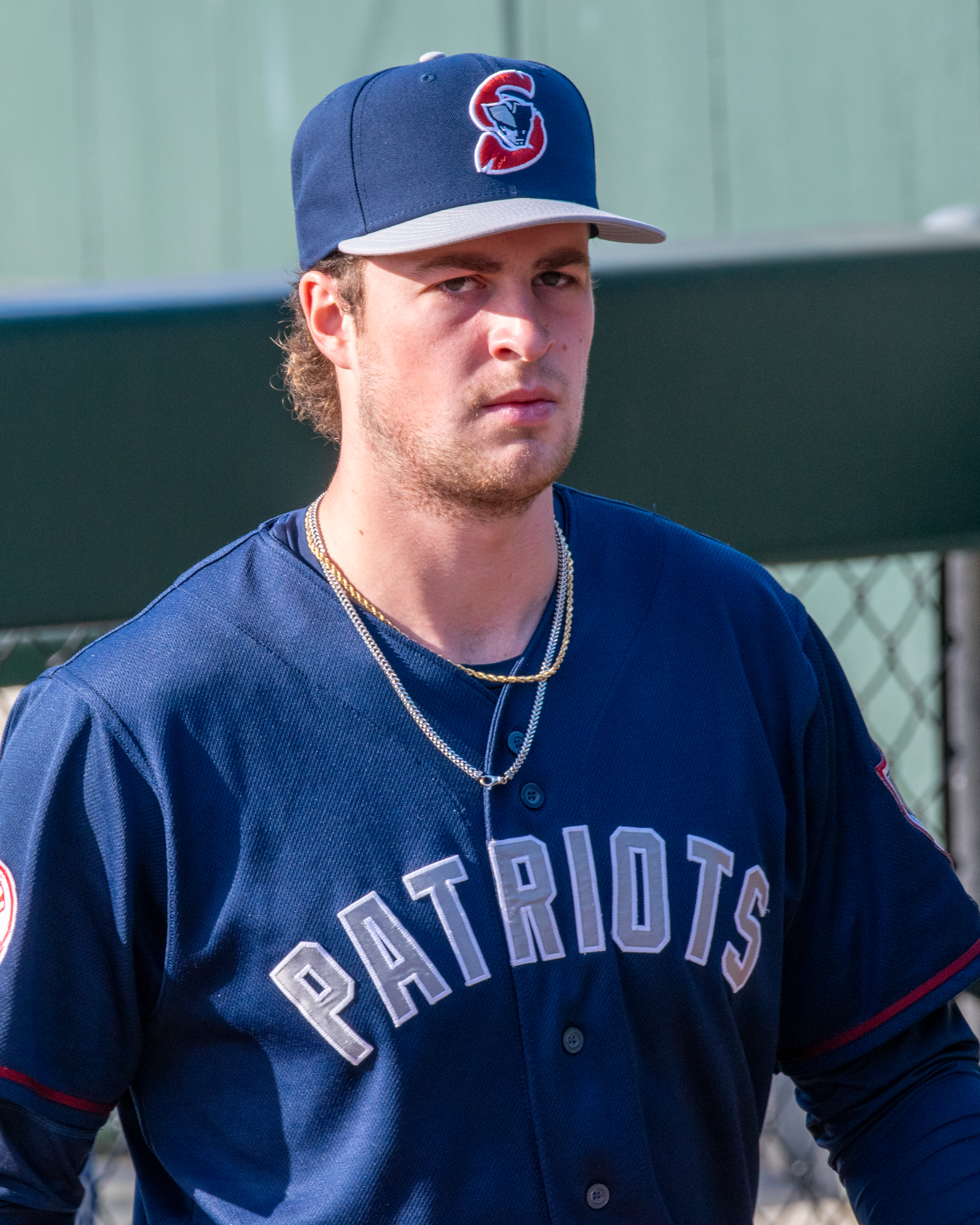
Schlitter with the Somerset Patriots in 2025

A season-ending injury to Clarke Schmidt caused the Yankees to promote Schlittler to the major leagues on July 9, 2025. In his MLB debut, Schlittler earned a win over the Seattle Mariners after throwing 5 1/3 innings with four hits and three earned runs allowed while striking out seven. His fastest pitch was 100 mph (160 km/h), the fastest thrown by a Yankee pitcher all season. Schlittler had a 4–3 win–loss record with a 2.96 ERA in 14 starts for the Yankees, while striking out 84 batters in 73 innings pitched.

Schlittler started Game 3 of the AL Wild Card Series against the Boston Red Sox, earning the win by pitching eight innings and striking out a then career high 12 batters while allowing five hits and no runs as the Yankees advanced to the Divisional Series (ALDS). He became the first pitcher in postseason history with 8+ scoreless innings, 12+ strikeouts, and no walks. Schlittler went on to lose the deciding fourth game of the ALDS to the Toronto Blue Jays, allowing two earned and two unearned runs over 6 1/3 innings.

==== 2026 ====
In 2026, Schlittler emerged as the ace on the Yankees roster while Gerrit Cole was recovering from Tommy John surgery. On June 19, he set a new career high with 13 strikeouts against the Cincinnati Reds. His 1.71 ERA through 16 starts was the lowest for a Yankee since Whitey Ford in 1964. Although selected as an All-Star and expected to start the game, Schlittler opted not to risk injury by pitching off of his normal schedule.

On August 28 against the Boston Red Sox, Schlittler recorded his 200th strikeout. He became the fifth pitcher in 2026 and the fourth-youngest Yankee to do so. On September 2, after another dominant start against the Los Angeles Angels, Schlittler passed Whitey Ford, Ron Guidry, and Jack Chesbro's tied franchise record for the most number of starts in a season with one run or fewer, with 19 at that point.

Schlittler's final ERA of 1.95 led the league and was the third-best in franchise history (since it became an official statistic in 1913). His 239 strikeouts was tied for fourth-most. His team record of games with one run or fewer reached 22.

Schlittler started the opening game of the Wild Card Series against the Red Sox. He threw a career-high 117 pitches over 6 1/3 scoreless innings, recording 10 strikeouts while allowing two hits and one walk.

In Game 2 of the 2026 ALDS, Schlittler was the losing pitcher against the Tampa Bay Rays, partly due to poor defense. He allowed 4 runs, with only two of them earned over 4 1/3 innings, while striking out two batters, the least of any start of his career.

On November 2, Schlittler was named a finalist for the American League Cy Young Award alongside Dylan Cease and Parker Messick. On November 11, he was named the unanimous winner of the award receiving all 30 first place ballots.

== Pitching style ==
Schlittler throws a mix of 5 pitches. He primarily throws a mix of three fastballs, with a four-seam fastball being his most common, followed by a cutter, and then a sinker. Along with the three fastballs, he also throws a curveball and, rarely, a slider. He has mostly dropped the slider now, with his last usage being May 26, 2026. His four-seam averages around 98 miles per hour (158 km/h) but can go as high as 101 miles per hour (163 km/h). His sinker is slightly slower, followed by the cutter, with his off-speed pitches clocking in at around 85–90 miles per hour (137–145 km/h). As all three of his fastballs start at the same point, he tunnels well, resulting in a large percentage of whiffs with many of his strikeouts being high heat.

== Personal life ==
Schlittler's father, John, is the chief of police for Needham, Massachusetts. Schlittler is an avid fan of the Boston Bruins of the National Hockey League; he is named after Bruins legend Cam Neely. He grew up a fan of his home team, the Boston Red Sox.
