= Elmer Rodríguez =

Puerto Rican baseball player (born 2003)

New York Yankees – No. 71
- Pitcher
- Born: August 18, 2003 (age 23); Trujillo Alto, Puerto Rico
- Bats: Left Throws: Right

MLB debut
- April 29, 2026, for the New York Yankees

MLB statistics (through 2026 season)
- Win–loss record: 0–3
- Earned run average: 5.40
- Strikeouts: 21
- Stats at Baseball Reference

Teams
- New York Yankees (2026–present)

Elmer Javier Rodríguez Cruz (born August 18, 2003) is a Puerto Rican professional baseball pitcher for the New York Yankees of Major League Baseball (MLB). He made his MLB debut in 2026.

== Career ==
=== Boston Red Sox ===
Rodríguez attended Leadership Christian Academy in Guaynabo, Puerto Rico. He was selected by the Boston Red Sox in the fourth round (105th overall) of the 2021 Major League Baseball draft. Rodríguez spent his first professional season in 2022 with the rookie-level Florida Complex League Red Sox and Single–A Salem Red Sox. He returned to Salem for the 2023 season, recording a 6–3 record and 2.60 ERA with 51 strikeouts across 55 1/3 innings pitched.

Rodríguez split the 2024 campaign between Salem and the High–A Greenville Drive. He made 21 appearances (including 20 starts) for the two affiliates, posting a cumulative 5–5 record and 2.91 ERA with 102 strikeouts across 89 2/3 innings pitched.

=== New York Yankees ===
On December 11, 2024, the Red Sox traded Rodríguez to the New York Yankees in exchange for Carlos Narváez. He split the 2025 season between the High-A Hudson Valley Renegades, Double-A Somerset Patriots, and Triple-A Scranton/Wilkes-Barre RailRiders, accumulating an 11–8 record and 2.58 ERA with 176 strikeouts over 150 innings of work. On November 18, 2025, the Yankees added Rodríguez to their 40-man roster to protect him from the Rule 5 draft.

The Yankees optioned Rodríguez to Triple-A Scranton/Wilkes-Barre to begin the 2026 season. Rodríguez was promoted to the major leagues for the first time on April 29, 2026. He made his MLB debut for the Yankees that day, taking the loss in a 3–0 defeat to the Texas Rangers after giving up two runs in four innings.

== International career ==
Rodríguez pitched for the Puerto Rico national baseball team in the 2026 World Baseball Classic.
