= Paul Blackburn (baseball) =

American baseball player (born 1993)

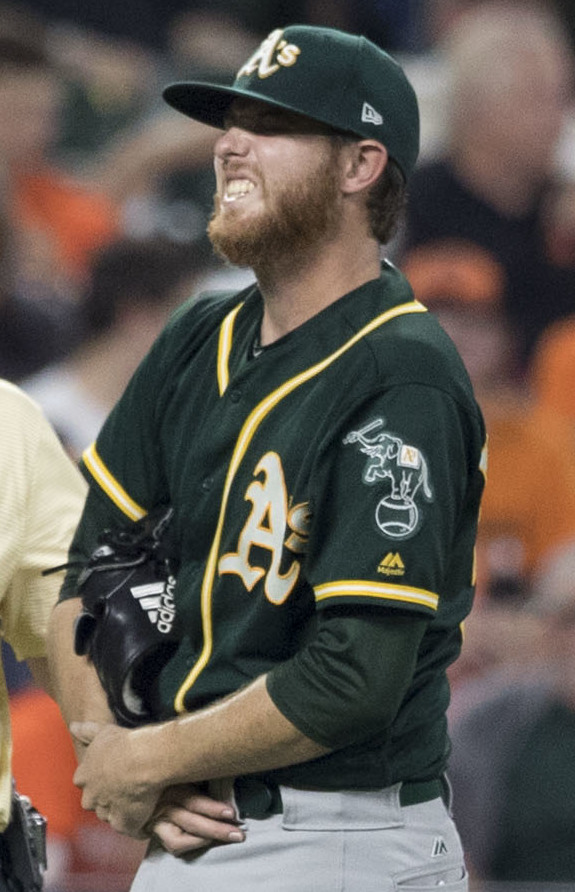
- Blackburn with the Oakland Athletics in 2017

Free agent
- Pitcher
- Born: December 4, 1993 (age 32); Antioch, California, U.S.
- Bats: Right Throws: Right

MLB debut
- July 1, 2017, for the Oakland Athletics

MLB statistics (through 2026 season)
- Win–loss record: 29–34
- Earned run average: 4.46
- Strikeouts: 431
- Stats at Baseball Reference

Teams
- Oakland Athletics (2017–2024); New York Mets (2024–2025); New York Yankees (2025–2026)

Career highlights and awards
- All-Star (2022)

Paul Cady Blackburn (born December 4, 1993) is an American professional baseball pitcher who is a free agent. He has played in Major League Baseball (MLB) for the Oakland Athletics, New York Mets, and New York Yankees. Blackburn made his MLB debut in 2017 with the Athletics and was an All-Star in 2022.

== Career ==
=== Draft and minor leagues ===
==== 2012–2016: Chicago Cubs and Seattle Mariners ====
Blackburn was drafted by the Chicago Cubs in the first round of the 2012 Major League Baseball draft out of Heritage High School in Brentwood, California. He made his professional debut that season with the Rookie Arizona League Cubs, going 2–0 with a 3.48 ERA in nine games (six starts). He played in 2013 with the Low-A Boise Hawks, going 2–3 with a 3.33 ERA in 13 games (12 starts), and in 2014 with the Single-A Kane County Cougars, pitching to a 9–4 record with a 3.23 ERA in 24 starts. He spent 2015 with the High-A Myrtle Beach Pelicans where he compiled a 7–5 record with a 3.11 ERA and a 1.24 WHIP in 18 starts. Blackburn began 2016 with the Double-A Tennessee Smokies.

On July 20, 2016, the Cubs traded Blackburn and Daniel Vogelbach to the Seattle Mariners in exchange for Mike Montgomery and Jordan Pries. Seattle assigned him to the Double-A Jackson Generals. In 26 total games (25 starts) between Tennessee and Jackson, he was 9–5 with a 3.27 ERA.

=== Oakland Athletics (2016–2024) ===
On November 12, 2016, Blackburn was traded to the Oakland Athletics for Danny Valencia. The Athletics added him to their 40-man roster a few days later. He began 2017 with the Triple-A Nashville Sounds. Through June 26, 2017, Blackburn had a 5–6 record with a 3.05 ERA and 56 strikeouts for the Sounds. On June 28, he was named to the 2017 Pacific Coast League All-Star Team.

==== 2017: Rookie season ====
Blackburn was called up to the Athletics to make his major league debut on July 1 against the Atlanta Braves. In his debut, Blackburn threw 6 innings, giving up 3 hits and no earned runs on 96 pitches in a 4–3 loss. He earned his first career win five days later on July 6 against the Mariners when he threw 7^{2}/_{3} innings, giving up 8 hits, one walk, and one earned run in a 7–4 victory. He spent the remainder of the season with Oakland, going 3–1 with a 3.22 ERA in ten starts. On August 22, Blackburn was struck on the hand by a line drive off the bat of Trey Mancini in the 5th inning during a start against the Baltimore Orioles. He exited the game and did not pitch again that season.

==== 2018–2021: Struggles ====
In 2018, Blackburn began the season on the disabled list. He was activated on June 7 and reported to Oakland, compiling a 7.16 ERA in six starts. On August 28, Blackburn was placed on the disabled list again with a forearm injury.

In 2019, Blackburn appeared in 4 games, pitching to a 10.64 ERA with 8 strikeouts in 11 innings pitched. He only made one appearance in 2020, giving up 7 earned runs in 2^{1}/_{3} innings pitched.

On February 23, 2021, Blackburn was designated for assignment after the signing of Mitch Moreland. On February 27, Blackburn was outrighted to the Triple-A Las Vegas Aviators and invited to spring training as a non-roster invitee. He spent most of the season in Triple-A before having his contract selected on August 18.

==== 2022–2024: First All-Star Game and consistency ====
In 2022, Blackburn's record with Oakland was 7–6 with a 4.28 ERA in 21 starts. He was Oakland's lone representative for the 2022 MLB All-Star Game.

On January 13, 2023, Blackburn signed a one-year, $1.9 million contract with the Athletics, avoiding salary arbitration. He began the 2023 season on the disabled list and made three rehab starts with the Stockton Ports and Las Vegas Aviators before being activated and starting for Oakland on May 29. During the 2023 season, he went 4–7 with a 4.43 ERA and a career-high 104 strikeouts in 21 appearances (20 starts).

On January 11, 2024, Blackburn signed a one-year, $3.45 million contract with the Athletics, avoiding salary arbitration for a second time. He began the season by throwing 19 1/3 innings without giving up a run over his first three starts. Blackburn set the team record for the most scoreless innings to start the season by a starting pitcher since the team moved to Oakland. The scoreless innings streak ended with 22 1/3 scoreless innings when he gave up a run in the fourth inning of his fourth start. It became the second longest season-opening scoreless inning streak in Athletics franchise history and the longest since Harry Krause in 1910. On May 13, Blackburn was placed on the 15-day injured list with a right foot injury. He was transferred to the 60-day injured list on June 4. Blackburn was activated on July 26. Across 9 starts for Oakland, he posted a 4–2 record, a 4.41 ERA, and 38 strikeouts in 51 innings pitched.

=== New York Mets (2024–2025) ===
==== 2024 ====
On July 30, 2024, the Athletics traded Blackburn to the New York Mets in exchange for pitcher Kade Morris. In 5 starts for the Mets, he logged a 1–2 record and a 5.18 ERA with 21 strikeouts over 24 1/3 innings pitched. On October 11, Blackburn underwent a cerebrospinal fluid leak repair and was ruled out for 4–5 months.

==== 2025 ====
Blackburn began the 2025 season on the 15-day injured list with right knee inflammation. On May 31, 2025, Mets manager Carlos Mendoza announced that Blackburn would be activated from the injured list. He made his season debut on June 2 against the Los Angeles Dodgers, striking out 3 batters allowing only one walk and 3 hits across 5 innings as the Mets went on to defeat the Dodgers 4–3 in extra innings. On June 8, Blackburn earned the first save of his career after closing out the last four innings of a 13–5 victory over the Colorado Rockies. However, Blackburn struggled heavily after, going 0-3 in his next three starts before landing on the injured list on July 3. Blackburn returned from the injured list and pitched five innings of relief on August 13 against the Atlanta Braves. He was designated for assignment by the Mets on August 16. Blackburn was released by New York on August 19.

=== New York Yankees (2025–present) ===
On August 21, 2025, Blackburn signed a major league contract with the New York Yankees. He made eight appearances for New York, recording a 5.28 ERA with 16 strikeouts across 15 1/3 innings pitched.

On January 15, 2026, Blackburn re-signed with the Yankees on a one-year, $2 million contract.
