= Anthony Volpe =

American baseball player (born 2001)

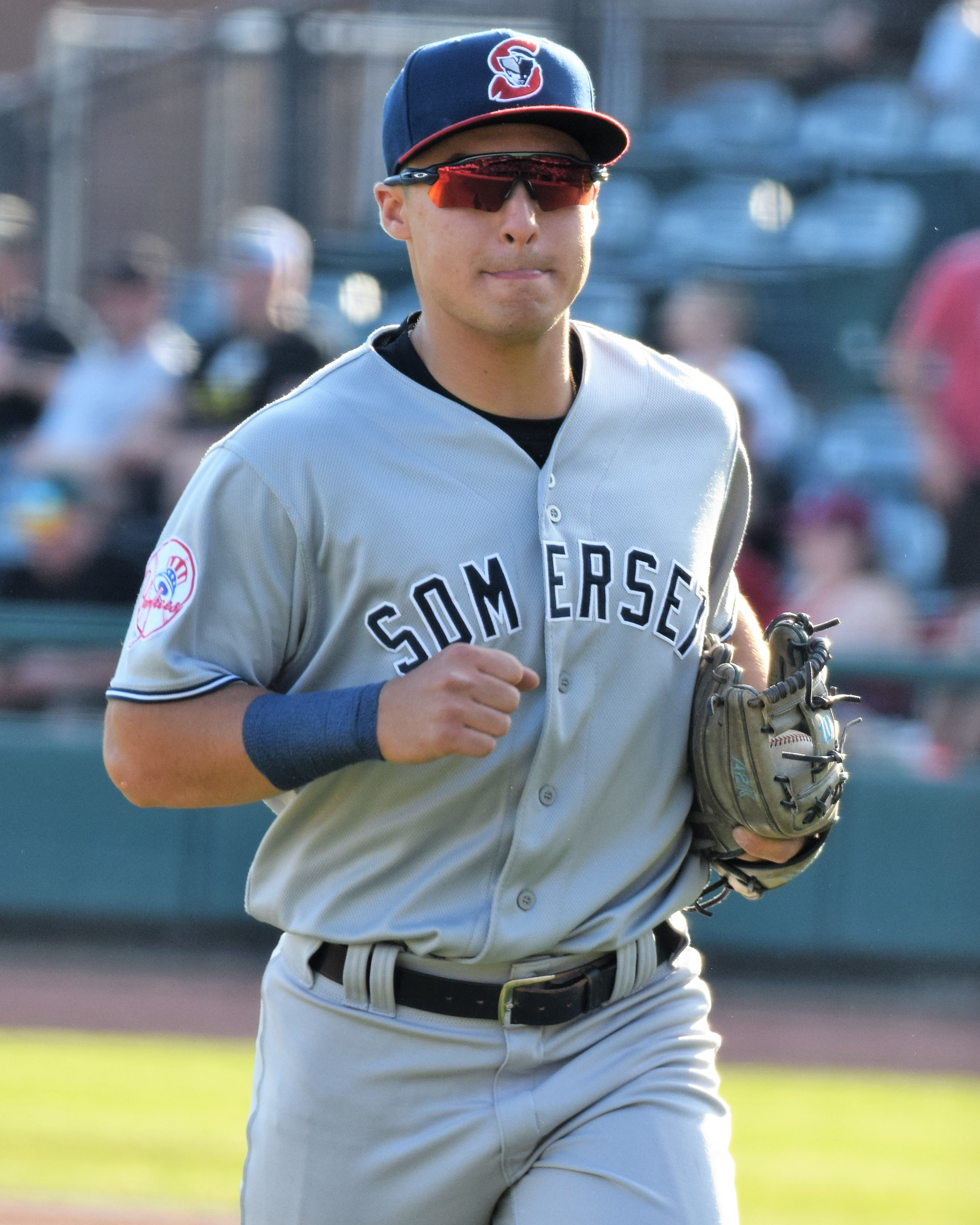
- Volpe with the Somerset Patriots in 2022

New York Yankees – No. 11
- Infielder
- Born: April 28, 2001 (age 25); Manhattan, New York, U.S.
- Bats: Right Throws: Right

MLB debut
- March 30, 2023, for the New York Yankees

MLB statistics (through 2026 season)
- Batting average: .225
- Home runs: 54
- Runs batted in: 220
- Stats at Baseball Reference

Teams
- New York Yankees (2023–present)

Career highlights and awards
- Gold Glove Award (2023)
Medals
Men's baseball
Representing the United States
U-12 Baseball World Cup
Gold medal – first place	2013 Taipei	Team
U-15 Baseball World Cup
Bronze medal – third place	2016 Iwaki	Team
COPABE U-18 Pan-American Championship
Gold medal – first place	2018 Panama	Team

Anthony Michael Volpe (born April 28, 2001) is an American professional baseball infielder for the New York Yankees of Major League Baseball (MLB). The Yankees selected Volpe in the first round of the 2019 MLB draft. He made his MLB debut in 2023, winning the American League Gold Glove Award at shortstop in his rookie year.

== Early life and amateur career ==
Volpe was born on April 28, 2001, at Mount Sinai Hospital in Manhattan, New York. Volpe's parents are doctors. His father, Michael, is a urologist and his mother, Isabelle, is an anesthesiologist. Michael is of Italian descent, with his parents (Anthony's grandparents) having been born in Naples. Isabelle was born and raised in the Philippines.

Anthony Volpe lived on the Upper East Side of Manhattan as a child. His family had partial season tickets to see the New York Yankees and he became a Yankees fan. He attended the Yankees' 2009 World Series championship parade. Volpe and his family moved to Watchung, New Jersey, when he was in the fourth grade.

Volpe attended Delbarton School in Morristown, New Jersey, where he played for the school's baseball team and was a teammate of Jack Leiter, who is an MLB pitcher. As a senior, he batted .488 with seven home runs, 34 runs batted in (RBIs), and 17 stolen bases. He was named the 2019 New Jersey High School Player of the Year by Perfect Game. Volpe committed to play college baseball at Vanderbilt University.

== Professional career ==
=== Minor leagues ===
The Yankees selected Volpe in the first round, with the 30th overall selection of the 2019 MLB draft. He signed on June 10, receiving a $2.7 million signing bonus, and made his professional debut with the Pulaski Yankees of the Rookie Advanced Appalachian League. Over 34 games, he batted .215 with two home runs and 11 RBI. During the COVID-19 shutdown, which resulted in the cancellation of the 2020 minor league season, Volpe worked to gain muscle and improve his swing.

Beginning the 2021 season, Volpe was assigned to the Tampa Tarpons of the Low-A Southeast. After slashing .302/.455/.623 with 12 home runs and 49 RBIs in 54 games played, he was promoted to the Hudson Valley Renegades of High-A East. He spent a full season with the club, hitting 27 home runs and stealing 33 bases.

The Yankees assigned Volpe to the Somerset Patriots of the Double-A Eastern League for the start of the 2022 season. On June 26, he hit a walk-off home run in the bottom of the 10th inning against the visiting Hartford Yard Goats. His solo homer delivered the Eastern League Northeast Division first-half title to the Somerset Patriots in a winner-take-all game between the division's top two teams. In July, he represented the American League at the All-Star Futures Game. Volpe batted .252 with 18 home runs and 60 RBIs in 109 games for Somerset and was promoted to the Scranton/Wilkes-Barre RailRiders of the Triple-A International League on September 2. That year, he became the minor leagues' first 20-homer, 50-steal player since Andruw Jones in 1996.

=== New York Yankees ===
==== 2023 ====
In 2023, the Yankees invited Volpe to spring training as a non-roster player, where he competed with Oswald Peraza for the starting shortstop role. On March 26, 2023, the Yankees announced that Volpe had earned a spot on the team's Opening Day roster as the starting shortstop. He recorded his first major league hit in the second game of the season on April 1. On April 14, he hit his first major league home run. On May 10, 2023, he hit his first career grand slam. He became the Yankees' first rookie shortstop to hit a grand slam. On May 13, he set a record as the first player in Yankees history to steal his first 13 career bases without being caught. On May 23, Volpe had his first walk-off plate appearance when he hit a sac fly to drive in the winning run against the Baltimore Orioles.

Volpe became the 15th MLB rookie to record both 20 home runs and 20 stolen bases in the same season. However, his .283 on-base percentage was the worst among qualified MLB players and his strikeout rate was 13th worst in the league. He finished his rookie season with a .209 batting average, .666 OPS, 21 home runs, 60 RBIs, 24 stolen bases, and 23 doubles. He received a single vote in American League Rookie of the Year voting, finishing in eighth place. He won the AL Gold Glove Award at shortstop, becoming the first Yankee rookie ever to receive the honor at any position and only the second rookie shortstop to win it, following Houston Astros rookie Jeremy Peña the previous season.

==== 2024 ====
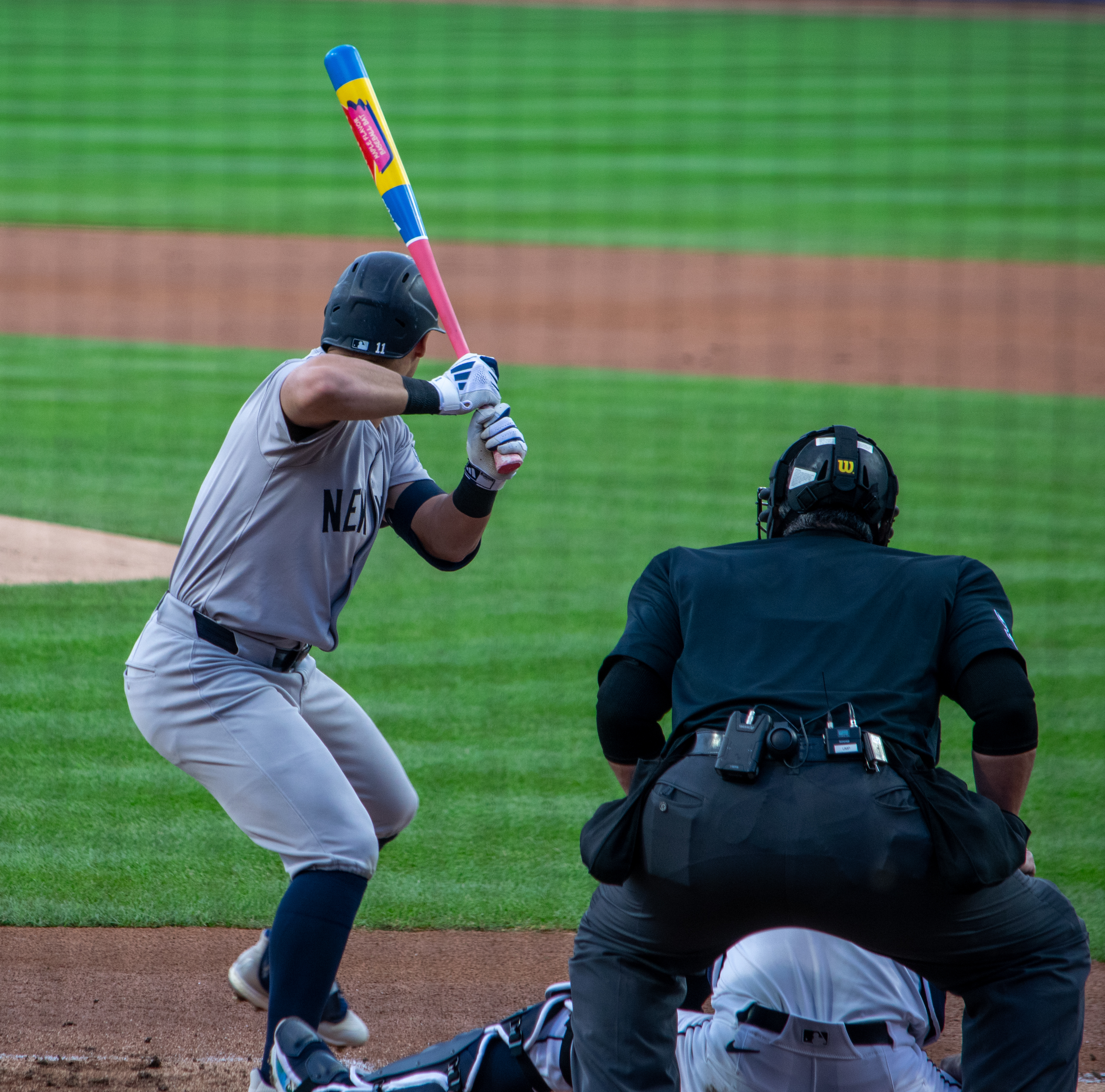
Volpe in 2024 with the Yankees

Volpe worked to refine his offense in the offseason, leveling his swing to improve his bat control in the upper part of the zone. He quickly improved his offensive profile to start the 2024 season, cutting his strikeout rate in half while increasing his walk rate and on-base percentage through the first two months of play. On April 1, 2024, he recorded his first four-hit game. In May, he recorded a 21-game hitting streak, the longest by a Yankees player in over a decade. The streak cemented his role as the team's regular lead-off hitter through the first half of the season. He was moved down in the lineup in July following a long offensive slump. He finished the regular season with a .243 batting average, .657 OPS, 12 home runs, 60 RBI, and 28 stolen bases.

In his first postseason, Volpe recorded a .287 batting average and .815 OPS with five stolen bases. In Game 4 of the 2024 World Series, he hit a grand slam, becoming the first player with four RBI and two stolen bases in a World Series game.

==== 2025 ====
Volpe's first career multi-homer game was on July 19, helping the Yankees to come back from five down to beat the Atlanta Braves 12–9. He made 153 appearances for New York during the regular season, hitting .212/.272/.391 with 19 home runs, 72 RBI, and 18 stolen bases. On October 14, following the Yankees' elimination in the postseason, Volpe underwent surgery to repair a partially torn left labrum which he had played part of the year with.

==== 2026 ====
Volpe began the season on the injured list to continue recovering from the shoulder surgery he previously had. On April 14, Volpe began his rehab assignment in Double-A Somerset. After the rehab assignment ended, Volpe was optioned to Triple-A Scranton/Wilkes-Barre before being recalled by the Yankees several days later. On August 4, he was optioned back down to Triple-A Scranton/Wilkes-Barre following the promotion of George Lombard Jr. On September 10, he was called up to the Yankees after Jazz Chisholm Jr. suffered an injury. Volpe started his first career game at second base and hit a grand slam and finished with three hits and five RBI in his first game back, a 10–3 win against the Colorado Rockies.

== See also ==
- All-Star Futures Game all-time roster
