= Štefan Bednár =

Slovak painter

- Born: 15 May 1909; Myjava, Austria-Hungary
- Died: 15 January 1976 (aged 66); Bratislava, Czechoslovakia
- Occupation: Painter

Štefan Bednár (15 May 1909 – 15 January 1976) was a Slovak painter. His work was part of the painting event in the art competition at the 1936 Summer Olympics. Bednár was an active member of Slovak Communist Party, which led to his imprisonment by Nazi German authorities during World War II.
