= Spencer Jones (outfielder) =

American baseball player (born 2001)

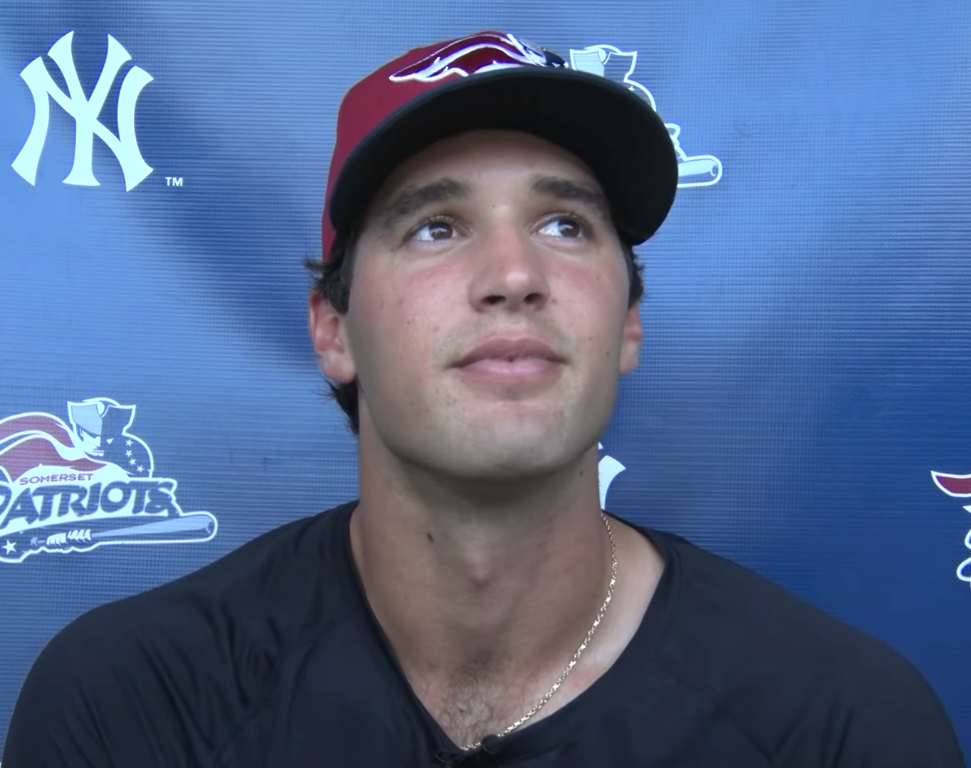
- Jones with the Somerset Patriots in 2024

New York Yankees – No. 78
- Center fielder
- Born: May 14, 2001 (age 25); Encinitas, California, U.S.
- Bats: Left Throws: Left

MLB debut
- May 8, 2026, for the New York Yankees

MLB statistics (through 2026 season)
- Batting average: .245
- Home runs: 11
- Runs batted in: 40
- Stats at Baseball Reference

Teams
- New York Yankees (2026–present)

Spencer George Jones (born May 14, 2001) is an American professional baseball outfielder for the New York Yankees of Major League Baseball (MLB). He made his MLB debut in 2026.

== Amateur career ==
Jones attended La Costa Canyon High School in Carlsbad, California. As a junior in 2018, he had a 4.09 earned run average (ERA) with 33 walks and 33 strikeouts over 27 1/3 innings pitched and had a .414 batting average with five home runs. He played in the Perfect Game All-American Classic and the Under Armour All-America Baseball Game that summer. He fractured his elbow as a senior in 2019 while pitching and missed the remainder of the season. He was still selected by the Los Angeles Angels in the 31st round of the 2019 Major League Baseball draft but did not sign and instead enrolled at Vanderbilt University to play college baseball.

Jones enrolled at Vanderbilt as a two-way player, and appeared in 14 games before the season was cancelled due to the COVID-19 pandemic. After the season, he began playing collegiate summer baseball with the Santa Barbara Foresters of the California Collegiate League. Midway through the summer, he injured his elbow once again and underwent Tommy John surgery. During his 2021 season at Vanderbilt, he was unable to pitch due to the surgery, but still appeared in 34 games as a designated hitter, batting .274 with three home runs and ten RBIs. That summer, he played in the Cape Cod Baseball League with the Brewster Whitecaps where he batted .309 with two home runs and twenty RBIs over 29 games. Jones returned fully healthy in 2022 and became Vanderbilt's starting right fielder, choosing to stop pitching. During a game on May 10, versus Indiana State University, Jones went 6-for-6 with a walk-off single in the 11th inning, tying the school record for most hits in a single game. He finished the season having played in 61 games with a .370/.460/.644 slash line with 12 home runs, 60 RBI, and 21 doubles, earning First Team All-SEC honors. Following the season's end, he traveled to San Diego where he participated in the Draft Combine.

== Professional career ==
The New York Yankees selected Jones in the first round with the 25th overall selection of the 2022 Major League Baseball draft. He signed with the team for $2.88 million. Jones made his professional debut with the Rookie-level Florida Complex League Yankees and was promoted to the Tampa Tarpons of the Single-A Florida State League after three games. Over 25 games between both teams, he batted .344 with four home runs, 12 RBI, and 12 stolen bases.

To begin the 2023 season, the Yankees assigned Jones to the Hudson Valley Renegades of the High-A South Atlantic League. He was selected to represent the Yankees (alongside Clayton Beeter) at the 2023 All-Star Futures Game. In late August, he was promoted to the Somerset Patriots of the Double-A Eastern League. Over 117 games, Jones slashed .267/.336/.444 with 12 home runs, 66 RBI, 29 doubles, and 43 stolen bases. He was assigned to Somerset for the 2024 season. Over 122 games, Jones batted .259 with 17 home runs, 78 RBI, thirty doubles, and 25 stolen bases.

Jones began the 2025 season with Somerset. On June 27, Jones was promoted to the Scranton/Wilkes-Barre RailRiders of the Triple-A International League. He homered 13 times in his first 19 Triple-A games, taking the minor league home run lead with 29. Jones ended the season having appeared in 116 games between the two teams, batting .274 with 35 home runs, 80 RBI, and 29 stolen bases. His 35 home runs were second in minor league baseball behind Ryan Ward's 36. On November 18, the Yankees added Jones to their 40-man roster to protect him from the Rule 5 draft. The Yankees optioned Jones to Scranton/Wilkes-Barre on March 9, 2026. Across 33 games with Scranton/Wilkes-Barre, Jones hit .258 with 11 home runs and 41 RBI.

On May 8, 2026, the Yankees promoted Jones to the major leagues. He made his MLB debut that night as New York's designated hitter against the Milwaukee Brewers at American Family Field and went hitless across three at-bats with two strikeouts. He recorded his first MLB hit, a RBI single off Brewers pitcher Logan Henderson, on May 10. Jones was optioned back to Scranton/Wilkes-Barre on May 22 after hitting .167 with two RBI, three walks, and 12 strikeouts across 24 at-bats.

Jones was recalled to the Yankees on June 5, taking the roster spot of the injured Aaron Judge. Against the Cleveland Guardians on June 9, he hit his first major league home run - a two-run home run off Slade Cecconi. At 112.2 miles per hour (180.6 km/h), it was the hardest-hit first career home run of the Statcast era. He was again optioned to Scranton/Wilkes-Barre on July 3. He was then called up on July 22 as the 27th man of a doubleheader against the Pittsburgh Pirates. He played as the designated hitter in the first game of the day, going 0-3 with a strikeout and a walk. He did not appear in the second game, and was optioned back to Scranton/Wilkes-Barre that night. He was then recalled on July 26 to fill the roster spot of an injured Cody Bellinger and played the rest of the season with the Yankees. Jones appeared in 86 games for the Yankees and batted .245 with 11 home runs and 40 RBI. He made his postseason debut in Game 1 of the 2026 American League Wild Card Series as New York's starting right fielder.
