= Rhoadesville, Virginia =

Unincorporated community in Virginia, United States

- Census-designated place
- Location within Virginia Location within the United States
- Coordinates: 38°16′24″N 77°55′42″W
- Country: United States
- State: Virginia
- County: Orange
- Elevation: 499 ft (152 m)
- Time zone: UTC-5 (Eastern (EST))
  - Summer (DST): UTC-4 (EDT)
- ZIP code: 22542
- Area code: 540
- GNIS feature ID: 1499953

Rhoadesville is an unincorporated community and census-designated place in Orange County, Virginia, United States. Rhoadesville is 10 miles (16 km) east-northeast of Orange. Rhoadesville has a post office with ZIP code 22542.

== Demographics ==
Historical population
Census	Pop.	Note	%±

The United States Census Bureau designated Rhoadesville as a census designated place (CDP) in 2023.
