= Brendan Beck =

American baseball player (born 1998)

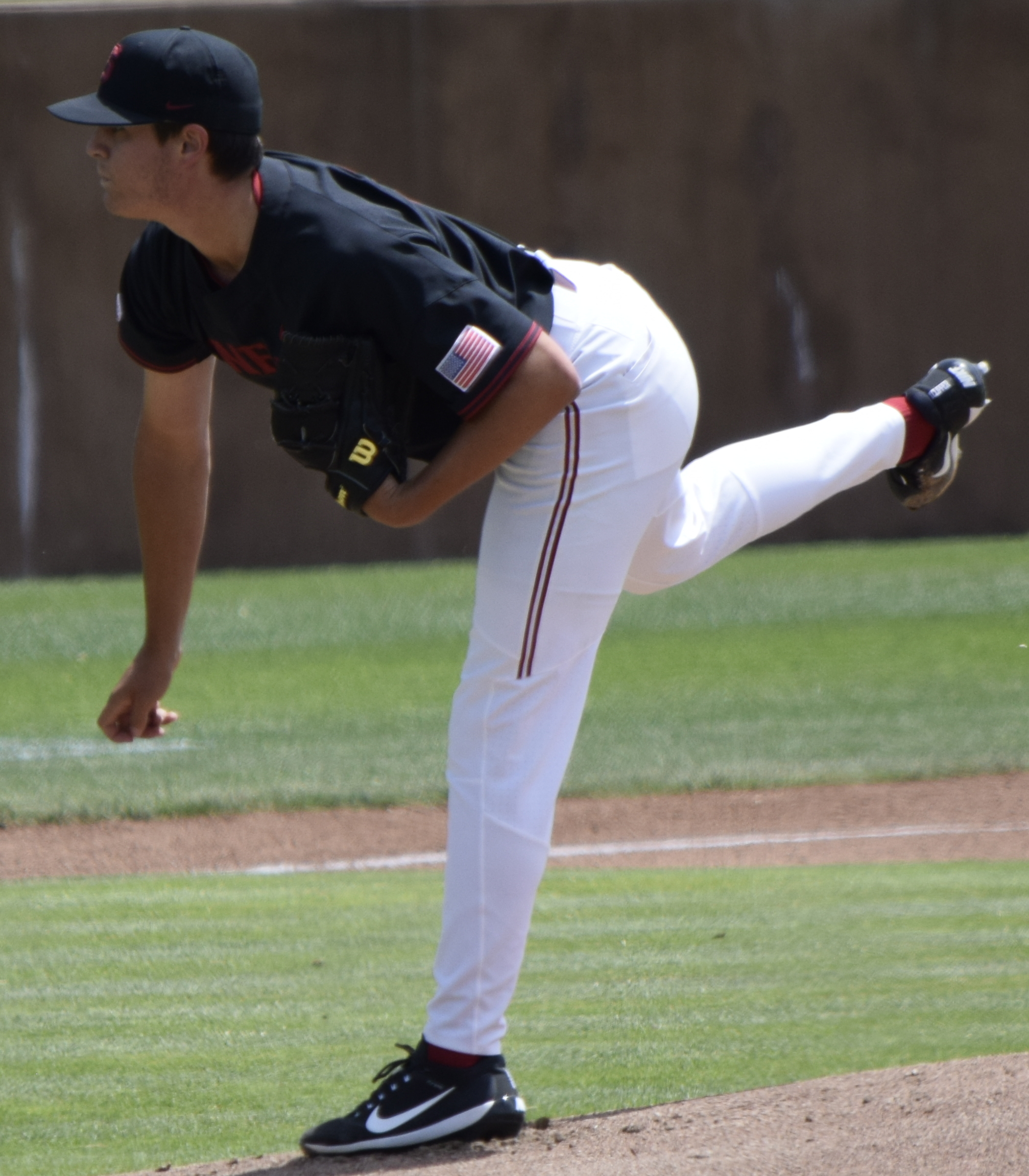
- Beck with Stanford in 2018

New York Yankees – No. 89
- Pitcher
- Born: October 6, 1998 (age 28); La Jolla, California, U.S.
- Bats: Right Throws: Right

MLB debut
- May 7, 2026, for the New York Yankees

MLB statistics (through 2026 season)
- Win–loss record: 0–2
- Earned run average: 9.95
- Strikeouts: 13
- Stats at Baseball Reference

Teams
- New York Yankees (2026–present)

Brendan Thomas Beck (born October 6, 1998) is an American professional baseball pitcher for the New York Yankees of Major League Baseball (MLB). He made his MLB debut in 2026.

== Amateur career ==
Beck attended Corona High School in Corona, California. He played for the school's baseball team as a pitcher and shortstop. During his sophomore year of high school, he committed to attend Stanford University to play college baseball for the Stanford Cardinal. He initially committed to Stanford as an infielder, but focused on pitching as the Cardinal already had enough infielders.

Beck was eligible to be selected in the 2020 MLB draft following his junior year, but the draft was shortened to five rounds due to the COVID-19 pandemic, and Beck was not selected. He returned to Stanford for his senior year in 2021. He completed his Cardinal career with a 22–10 win–loss record, a 3.11 earned run average (ERA), and 289 strikeouts in 289 1/3 innings pitched.

== Professional career ==
The New York Yankees chose Beck in the second round, with the 55th overall selection, of the 2021 Major League Baseball draft. On July 18, 2021, Beck signed with the Yankees for a $1.05 million bonus. In February 2022, it was announced that Beck had undergone Tommy John surgery the previous summer and would miss the entire 2022 season.

Beck made his professional debut in 2023, pitching to a 1.74 ERA in 31 innings for the High-A Hudson Valley Renegades. He then missed the 2024 season due to an elbow injury. In 2025, Beck pitched for the Double-A Somerset Patriots. After pitching to a 1.82 ERA in 11 games, the Yankees promoted him to the Triple-A Scranton/Wilkes-Barre RailRiders on June 22.

Beck was assigned to Triple-A Scranton/Wilkes-Barre to begin the 2026 season, where he compiled a 2–2 record and 5.11 ERA with 37 strikeouts across seven starts. On May 7, 2026, Beck was selected to the 40-man roster and promoted to the major leagues. He made his MLB debut that day, allowing two runs in three innings pitched as a bulk relief pitcher, and was optioned back to Scranton/Wilkes-Barre following the game.

Minor League Baseball named Beck the International League's pitcher of the week for the week of May 11-17 after pitching 5 2/3 innings without allowing a run. On June 5, Beck threw the first seven innings of a combined no-hitter, which was completed by Carson Coleman. The Yankees recalled Beck from Triple-A to replace the injured Carlos Rodón on July 4. Shortly after making his first career start, where he allowed 5 runs on 3 home runs in 3 2/3 innings pitched, Beck was optioned to Triple-A later that same day.

== International career ==
Beck played for the Great Britain national baseball team in the 2026 World Baseball Classic.

== Personal life ==
Beck's mother and older sister are Stanford graduates. Beck and his older brother, Tristan, played baseball together for Corona High and Stanford.
