= Max Schuemann =

American baseball player (born 1997)

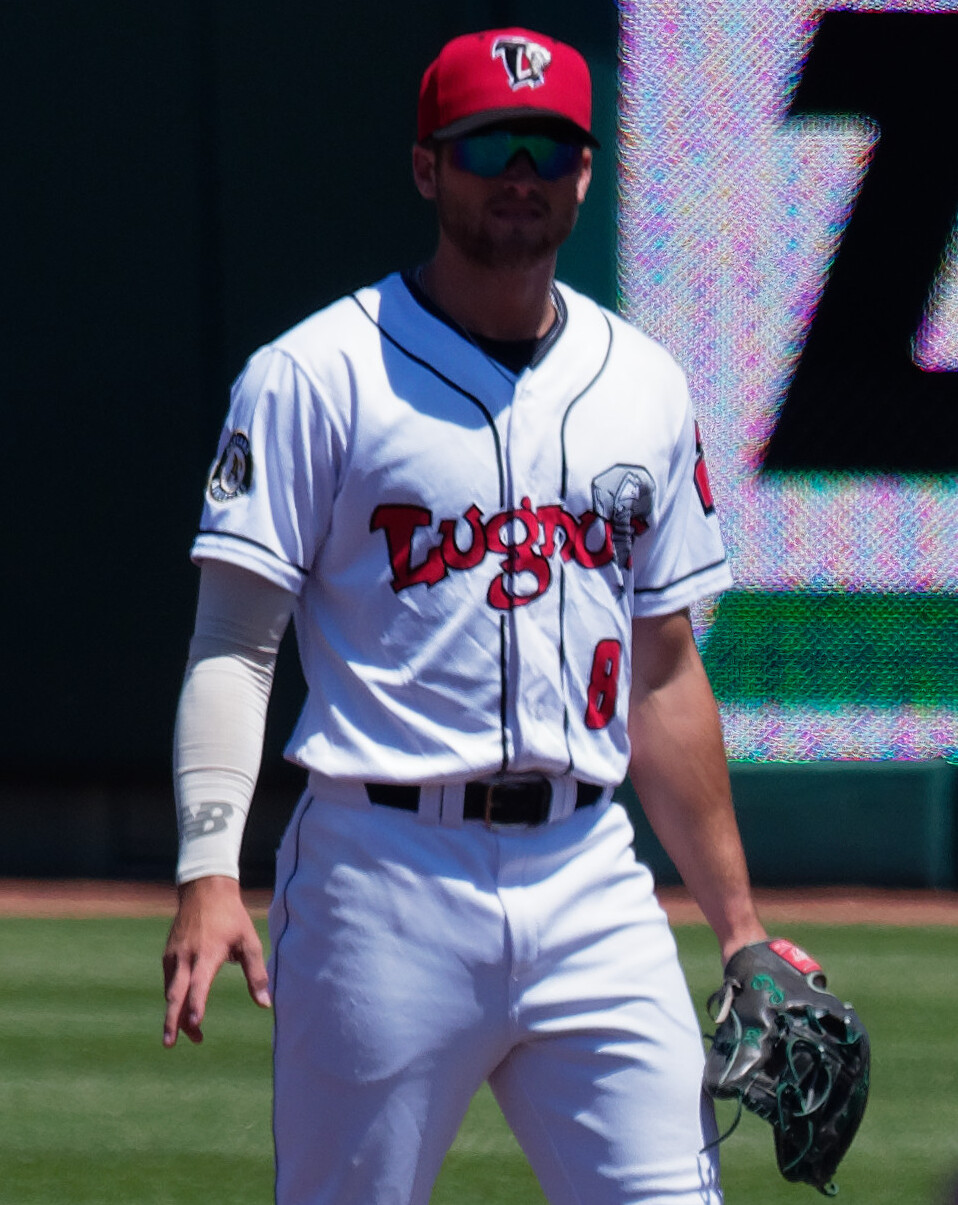
- Schuemann with the Lansing Lugnuts in 2021

New York Yankees – No. 30
- Utility player
- Born: June 11, 1997 (age 29); Portage, Michigan, U.S.
- Bats: Right Throws: Right

MLB debut
- April 12, 2024, for the Oakland Athletics

MLB statistics (through 2026 season)
- Batting average: .210
- Home runs: 11
- Runs batted in: 55
- Stats at Baseball Reference

Teams
- Oakland Athletics / Athletics (2024–2025); New York Yankees (2026–present)

Maxwell Carter Schuemann (born June 11, 1997) is an American professional baseball utility player for the New York Yankees of Major League Baseball (MLB). He has previously played in MLB for the Oakland Athletics / Athletics.

== Amateur career ==
Schuemann attended Portage Northern High School in Portage, Michigan, where he played basketball and baseball. In 2014, his junior year, he batted .490 with 33 runs batted in (RBI). Schuemann went unselected in the 2015 Major League Baseball draft and enrolled at Eastern Michigan University where he played college baseball for the Eastern Michigan Eagles. In 2018, his junior year, he batted .317 with four home runs, 30 RBI, and 24 stolen bases over 56 games.

== Professional career ==
=== Oakland Athletics / Athletics ===
The Oakland Athletics selected Schuemann in the 20th round (593rd overall) of the 2018 Major League Baseball draft. Schuemann signed with Oakland and made his professional debut with the Vermont Lake Monsters of the Low–A New York–Penn League, batting .195 over 45 games. In 2019, he played with the Beloit Snappers of the Single–A Midwest League with whom he hit .256 with three home runs, 35 RBI, and 25 steals over 94 games.

Schuemann did not play in a game in 2020 due to the cancellation of the minor league season because of the COVID-19 pandemic. He began the 2021 season with the Lansing Lugnuts of the High-A Central, with whom he set a franchise record with five stolen bases in one game. He was promoted to the Midland RockHounds of the Double-A Central and the Las Vegas Aviators of the Triple-A West during the season. Over 119 games between the three clubs, Schuemann slashed .271/.372/.388 with seven home runs, 42 RBI, and 52 stolen bases. He returned to Midland to begin the 2022 season. In mid-July, he was promoted to Las Vegas, but was assigned back to Midland shortly after. Over ninety games between the two teams, he compiled a slash line of .274/.403/.422 with nine home runs, 41 RBI, and 24 stolen bases. For the 2023 season, Schuemann played with both Midland and Las Vegas, batting .276 with ten home runs, 51 RBI, and 23 stolen bases over 116 games. Schuemann was assigned to Las Vegas to begin the 2024 season.

Schuemann was selected to Oakland's roster and promoted to the major leagues for the first time on April 11, 2024, following an injury to Brent Rooker. He recorded his first MLB hit, a solo home run off Logan Allen, on April 20 at Progressive Field. Schuemann appeared in 133 games for Oakland during his rookie campaign, slashing .220/.311/.308 with seven home runs, 34 RBI, and 14 stolen bases.

Schuemann played in 101 games for the Athletics during the 2025 season, batting .197/.295/.273 with two home runs, 13 RBI, and seven stolen bases. On February 6, 2026, Schuemann was designated for assignment following the acquisition of Andy Ibáñez.

=== New York Yankees ===
On February 9, 2026, Schuemann was traded to the New York Yankees in exchange for Luis Burgos. Schuemann was optioned to the Triple-A Scranton/Wilkes-Barre RailRiders to begin the regular season. The Yankees promoted him to the major leagues on April 28. He was optioned and recalled multiple times during the season. Schuemann played in a total of 43 games for the Yankees and batted .194 with two home runs and eight RBI.
