= George Lombard Jr. =

American baseball player (born 2005)

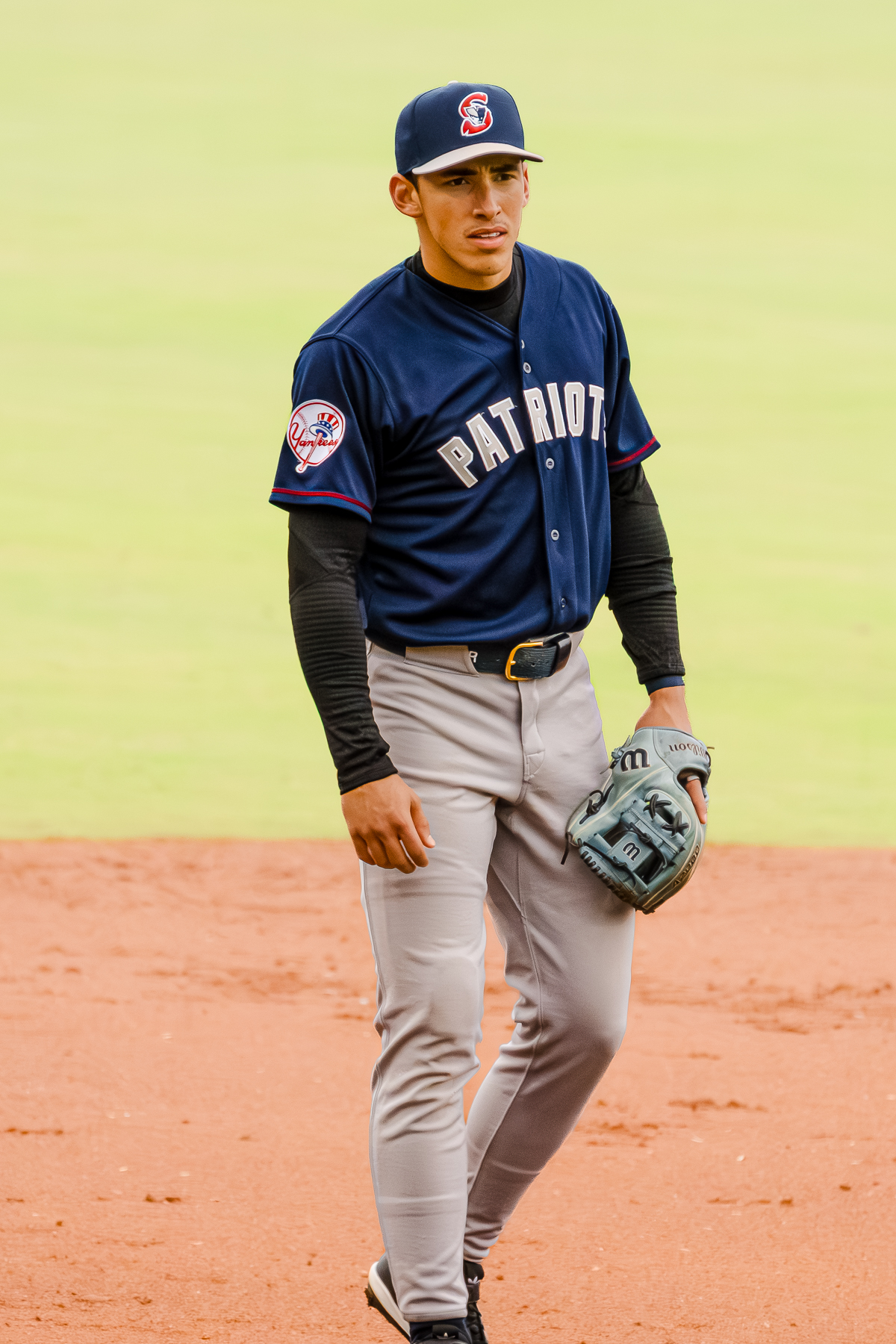
- Lombard Jr with the Somerset Patriots in 2026

New York Yankees – No. 96
- Shortstop
- Born: June 2, 2005 (age 21); Miami, Florida, U.S.
- Bats: Right Throws: Right

MLB debut
- August 4, 2026, for the New York Yankees

MLB statistics (through 2026 season)
- Batting average: .237
- Home runs: 7
- Runs batted in: 22
- Stats at Baseball Reference

Teams
- New York Yankees (2026–present)

George Alexander Lombard Jr. (born June 2, 2005) is an American professional baseball shortstop for the New York Yankees of Major League Baseball (MLB). He was selected by the Yankees in the first round of the 2023 MLB draft and made his MLB debut in 2026.

== Amateur career ==
Lombard attended Gulliver Preparatory School in Pinecrest, Florida. He played for the school's baseball and soccer teams, winning state championships in both sports. Lombard committed to attend Vanderbilt University to play college baseball for the Vanderbilt Commodores.

== Professional career ==
The New York Yankees selected Lombard in the first round with the 26th overall pick of the 2023 Major League Baseball draft. He signed with the Yankees, reportedly receiving a $3.3 million signing bonus.

Lombard made his professional debut after signing with the Rookie-level Florida Complex League Yankees and also played with the Single-A Tampa Tarpons. Across 13 games, he batted .311. In 2024, he played for Tampa and the High-A Hudson Valley Renegades. He played 110 games between the two clubs and hit .231 with five home runs, 45 RBI, 25 doubles and 39 stolen bases.

Lombard drew high praise during spring training in 2025 from the media and scouts. He started the 2025 season with High-A Hudson Valley and was promoted to the Double-A Somerset Patriots in early May. Across 132 games for the season, Lombard batted .235 with nine home runs, 49 RBI, 32 doubles and 35 stolen bases.

Lombard began the 2026 season with Somerset and batted .312 with four home runs in 20 games. The Yankees promoted him to the Triple-A Scranton/Wilkes-Barre RailRiders on April 29. He was placed on the injured list on June 18 with two sprained fingers before returning to Scranton/Wilkes-Barre on July 17.

On August 4, the Yankees called up Lombard, where he effectively swapped roster spots with shortstop Anthony Volpe, who was demoted to Triple-A. Lombard made his Major League debut that night against the St. Louis Cardinals at Yankee Stadium, where he went 1-for-2, with a walk and a solo home run, helping the Yankees to a 2-0 victory. On September 9, Lombard hit his first grand slam, his third homer of the year, against the Colorado Rockies in Yankee Stadium, which was also the very first grand slam the Yankees had notched in the season. Lombard's shot hit off Tomoyuki Sugano in the bottom of the 3rd made him the youngest Yankee since Mickey Mantle to hit a grand slam.

== Personal life ==
Lombard is the son of former Major League Baseball player George Lombard, who played for four different teams in the late 1990s and early 2000s. As of 2026, Lombard Sr. is the bench coach for the Detroit Tigers. George Jr.'s brother, Jacob, is also a shortstop, and also played at Gulliver. Jacob was selected by the Miami Marlins in the first round of the 2026 MLB draft. His mother's side of the family is Cuban, and he speaks fluent Spanish. His grandmother, Posy, was a civil rights activist and Martin Luther King Jr. associate.
