= David Bednar (general manager) =

Manager of the Canadian National Exhibition Association (born 1952)

- Born: 1952 (age 73–74); Dallas, Texas, United States
- Education: Bishop's University
- Employer: Canadian National Exhibition Association
- Title: General manager
- Term: 1998–2015
- Predecessor: Bryan Tisdall (1989–1997)
- Successor: Virginia Luby (designate)
- Children: Four from a previous marriage, two step-children from his wife's previous marriage

David Bednar (born 1952) is an American-born former theatre manager in Canada. He served as the general manager of the Canadian National Exhibition Association, which runs an annual fair called the Canadian National Exhibition (CNE). He retired in May 2015.

Born in Dallas, Texas, Bednar was educated in theatre and business at Bishop's University in Quebec, initially working with summer theatre programs, such as Festival Lennoxville, the Canadian Mime Theatre and, later, Shaw Festival. He Joined the theatre production company Livent in 1989, before it was spun off into its own operation. He managed the Toronto venues, Pantages Theatre and North York Performing Arts Centre, before managing the Ford Center for the Performing Arts in New York City. Bednar was chairman of the Yonge Street Business and Residents Association during the initial planning of Yonge-Dundas Square (now Sankofa Square), a significant redevelopment to Toronto's downtown.

Bednar was hired by the Canadian National Exhibition Association following a decade of financial difficulty for the fair. He made a variety of operational and programming changes over the years. Notably, he repositioned the fair's focuses as technology supplanted earlier attractions. He became a Canadian citizen in 2000, at a ceremony in the Automotive Building, during the company's fair.

Bednar retired in March, 2015. In May 2025, he renounced his US citizenship.

== Early life and career ==
Born in 1952, Bednar was raised in Dallas, Texas. His father was a petroleum engineer. Bednar attended the State Fair of Texas while growing up. He moved to Quebec in 1970, to major in theatre and minor in business at Bishop's University. He remained in Canada, married, and became a landed immigrant. He worked at the Quebec City Summer Stock Theatre and Festival Lennoxville, and repaired telephones for Bell Canada. He became general manager of Canadian Mime Theatre in Niagara-on-the-Lake. Later Bednar became director of operations for the Shaw Festival. With four young children to support, he passed on investing in the board game Trivial Pursuit (1982).

Bednar joined the theatre production company Live Entertainment Corporation of Canada, Inc. (Livent) in 1989, while it was still a division of motion picture exhibitor Cineplex Odeon. Garth Drabinsky and Myron Gottlieb purchased the division from their employers in December 1989, as Cineplex looked to offload assets. Originally the assistant general manager of The Pantages Theatre, he became its general manager. In 1993, he moved to North York Performing Arts Centre to prepare it for the stage revival of the musical Show Boat. Livent used Toronto as the test site for the original Broadway production of Ragtime; it made it world premiere at North York Centre in 1996, and Bednar was involved in production. As of 1997, Bednar was general manager of The Pantages Theatre. and general manager of theatre for its parent company, Livent. From 1997 to 1998, near the end of his time with the company, he spent a year in New York City preparing the Ford Center for the Performing Arts for its opening and that of Ragtime; he had worked on the production previously in Toronto. He was scheduled to oversee the remake of Chicago's Oriental Theatre into the Ford Center for the Performing Arts Oriental Theatre.

Bednar was president of the Yonge Street Business and Residents Association as of 1996, when the City of Toronto approved a public square at Yonge and Dundas, now known as Sankofa Square. It was part of a larger Yonge Street Regeneration Program.

== Canadian National Exhibition ==
Bednar was hired by the Canadian National Exhibition in 1998, during a period during a period where both the CNEA and Exhibition Place grounds had low profitability or were losing money. The CNEA made just $70,000 in 1997. (Note: The CNEA operated at a loss in 1996, turned a profit of $332,000 in 1997, but their portion of severance payments reduced that number to $70,000.) He said he was being paid less than his predecessor, Bryan Tisdall, who was one of five departing executives that the CNEA and Exhibition Place grounds made large severance payments to. When Bednar joined, the 1998 fair was already planned, and he would not comment on its future direction. (Note: Bednar was later candid in his criticism of the Tisdall era, highlighting a seniors' pavilion that included a booth to arrange a funeral.) The following year, CNE started promoting its events on weekends, which there was previously a policy against. The change in policy allowed corporate partners to offer discounted or free ticket promotions. This led to a 7 percent increase in admissions, but a large reduction in revenues. According to a city councillor on the CNEA board, the crowding and traffic of the event discouraged potential customers from continuing to visit the event in the final week.

In response to the proliferation of the internet, the fair changed under Bednar's leadership from themes of the future to "community celebration". Bednar-era introductions include the SuperDogs animal variety performance (since 2000), and nostalgia performers at the Bandshell stage for the CNE's established older audience. He has maintained agricultural-related programming, the Exhibition's original focus, as a public awareness effort. Based on the fair's main target audience, families with young children, Bednar introduced a behavioural research study, dubbed the "family fun index". Despite Bednar's success in righting CNE through increased attendance, negative attitudes to the fair are still common among the local community. (Note: Bednar told the Star that, if "it's a good memory, we can't live up to it; if it's a bad memory, we can't live it down.")

Bednar has featured heavily in the Ex's public profile, and advocated for openness in communications. Food Building vendor Epic Burgers and Waffles' cronuts were tainted by Staphylococcus aureus toxin in 2013, a result of third party maple bacon jam. He advocated that the corporation discuss the issue directly and claimed doing so would increase the fair's credibility with the public.

Bednar was President of the Board of the Canadian Association of Fairs and Exhibitions in 2006 and 2007. Bednar retired in April 2015. The assistant general manager and director of operations, Virginia Ludy, succeeded him.

== Personal life ==
Bednar passed the Canadian citizenship test in June 1999, but it was suggested he should delay taking the Oath of Citizenship until the next year of the Canadian National Exhibition (CNE) fair. He became a Canadian citizen at the 2000 CNE, during a Citizenship Ceremony in the Automotive Building. The Citizenship Oath was administered by Bill Withrow, longtime director of the Art Gallery of Ontario and great-grandson of John Withrow, the Canadian National Exhibition Association's first president.

Bednar has an interest in antique cars and has a few vehicles that are a mix of antiques and modern cars. According to Bednar, he took an interest in cars on display at the State Fair of Texas at an early age. He considers himself "a bit of a carpenter." As of 2012, he co-owned four residential properties.

After retirement, Bednar and wife Alex continued to divide their time between Toronto and a vacation property in Prince Edward County. In 2020, partly due to COVID, they moved to PEC.
